= Cabinet of Afghanistan =

Executive body of the Afghan government

- Flag of Afghanistan

Overview
- Established: 7 September 2021 (current form); 28 February 1919 (original)
- State: Afghanistan
- Appointed by: Supreme Leader
- Ministries: Twenty-six
- Responsible to: Leadership
- Annual budget: 231,400,000,000 Afghan afghanis (FY 2022–23)
- Headquarters: Arg, Kabul

The Cabinet of Afghanistan (also known as the Council of Ministers) is the executive body of the government of the country, responsible for day-to-day governance and the implementation of policy set by the Leadership. In its modern form it has existed since the beginning of the reign of Emir Amanullah Khan in 1919.

The cabinet is headed by the prime minister—who serves as the nation's head of government—and his deputies, and consists of the heads and deputy heads of the government ministries.

== Predecessors to a cabinet ==
=== 18th century ===
When Ahmad Shah Durrani started ruling over his empire in 1747, he had no administrative experience, nor did much of his closest advisors. As a result, he chose to adopt a government style similar to the Mughals and Safavids, with his main idea of a government based on an absolute monarchy. A tribal council ruled in hand with Ahmad Shah as well, serving as a form of cabinet. However, Ahmad Shah had made the positions of his cabinet hereditary, thus making it difficult to dismiss advisors without causing conflict. Their roles, however, were mostly purely de jure, and tasks were delegated to subordinates.

His grandson Zaman Shah had wanted a ministry and cabinet that would be loyal to him and of his people, as a result he had replaced the old ministry of his father Timur Shah and replaced them with loyal Pashtuns devoted to himself, strengthening his position on the throne.

=== 19th century ===
Under Emir Sher Ali Khan, Afghanistan saw its first formal cabinet structure. He first established a twelve-member consultative state council (the first such body since Ahmad Shah Durrani) composed of civic leaders and military officers of his own selection, though it faded in practice during the latter years of his reign. In 1873, on the occasion of the official nomination of Sardar Abdullah Jan as heir apparent, the Emir enlarged the executive branch and promoted a set of officials to ministerial positions with Pashto titles. He did not include any member of the royal Mohammadzai dynasty. Instead, he explicitly applied the principle of personal qualification in his appointments. The cabinet's effectiveness was demonstrated in the turbulent period surrounding the amir's death, when Prime Minister Nur Mohammad Khan Foshanji and Finance Minister Habib Allah Wardak played stabilizing roles.

Foshanji cabinet
Portfolio	Name	Year(s)	Affiliation	Origin
Role
Prime Minister	Nur Mohammad Shah Foshanji	1873 – before 21 February 1879		
Key ministries
Foreign Affairs	Aersala Khan Ghilzay	1873 – before 21 February 1879	pro-Sher Ali	
War	Hussayn 'Ali Khan	1873 – before 21 February 1879	pro-Sher Ali	
Home Affairs	'Asmat Allah Khan Ghilzay	1873 – before 21 February 1879	pro-Sher Ali	
Finance	Habib Allah Khan Wardak	1873 – 21 February 1879	pro-Sher Ali	
Treasury	Ahmad 'Ali Khan Timuri	1873 – before 21 February 1879	pro-Sher Ali	
Chief Secretary	Mohammad Hassan Khan	1873 – before 21 February 1879	pro-Sher Ali	Qizilbash

Yaqub Khan cabinet
Portfolio	Name	Year(s)	Affiliation	Origin
Role
Key ministries
External Affairs	Shah Mohammad Khan	before – after 14 September 1879	pro-Yaqub Khan	
Finance	Habib Allah Khan Wardak	21 February – after 14 September 1879	pro-Yaqub Khan	

When Emir Abdur Rahman Khan came to power in Kabul in 1880, the central administration consisted of only ten clerks overseen by a single official. Using the military branch as a supervisory body, he established a civil administration that, in a modified form, remains in place today. He introduced institutions that were precursors to modern ministries, such as the Treasury Board, Board of Trade, Bureau of Justice and Police, Department of Public Works, Office of Posts and Communications, Department of Education, and Department of Medicine. Despite his autocratic rule, Abdur Rahman Khan created a Supreme Council, similar to a modern cabinet.

However, this council had no prime minister and no real power, serving only in an advisory capacity. Its members included high-ranking officials like the lord chamberlain ('Ishik Aghasi' or Shahghasi), the seal keeper, the chief secretary, secretaries appointed by the Amir, officers of the Royal Guard, the treasurer of the Amir's private wealth, the secretary of state for War, regional secretaries of state, the postmaster general, the commander-in-chief, the master of the horse, the Kotwal (equivalent to an Interior Minister), the accountant general, the chief chamberlain, the superintendent of the armory, and heads of the Trade and Education Boards.

=== Early 20th century ===
In 1914, counselors advised Emir Habibullah Khan on different political issues and had some form of authority. With Emir Amanullah Khan's ascension to the throne on 28 February 1919, amidst numerous political reforms, the Council of Ministers, headed by Amanullah himself, was established, creating the first well-structured cabinet in the history of Afghanistan.

== Emirate/Kingdom (1919–1973) ==
=== Quddus/Ahmad cabinet (1919–1929) ===
Quddus Cabinet
Portfolio	Name	Year(s)
Role
Prime Minister	Abdul Quddus Khan	28 February 1919 – 25 October 1927
Prime Minister	Shir Ahmad Khan	25 October 1927 – 17 January 1929
President of Assembly	did not exist until April 1924	
President of Assembly	Shir Ahmad Khan	April 1924 – December 1927
President of Assembly	Muhammad Yaqub	December 1927 – 17 January 1929
Key ministries
Foreign Affairs	Mahmud Tarzi	28 February 1919 – June 1922
Foreign Affairs	Muhammad Wali Khan Darwazi	June 1922 – April 1924
Foreign Affairs	Shir Ahmad Khan (acting)	April – September 1924
Foreign Affairs	Mahmud Tarzi	September 1924 – January 1927
Foreign Affairs	Ghulam Siddiq Khan Charkhi (acting)	January – November 1927
Foreign Affairs	Muhammad Wali Khan Darwazi (acting)	November 1927 – November 1928
Foreign Affairs	Ghulam Siddiq Khan Charkhi	November 1928 – 17 January 1929
War	did not exist until May 1919	
War	Mohammad Nadir Khan	May 1919 – January 1922
War	Mohammad Hashim Khan	January – September 1922
War	Muhammad Nadir Khan	September 1922 – April 1924
War	Muhammad Wali Khan Darwazi (acting)	April – June 1924
War	Abdul Aziz Barakzai	June 1924 – 17 January 1929
Interior	did not exist until August 1919	
Interior	Ali Ahmad Khan	August 1919 – June 1925
Interior	Abdul Aziz Barakzai	June 1925 – 1928
Interior	Abdul Ahad Wardak	1928 – 17 January 1929
Justice	Muhammad Ibrahim	1919 – 1924
Justice	Hayatullah Khan	1924 – 17 January 1929
other ministries
Commerce	did not exist until March 1919	
Commerce	Ghulam Muhammad Wardak	March 1919 – April 1924
Commerce	Abdul Hadi Dawi	April 1924 – 1928
Commerce	Ali Muhammad	1928 – 17 Januar 1929
Education	Abdur Rahman Khan	1919
Education	Abdul Habib Khan	1919
Education	Muhammad Sulaiman	?
Education	Hayatullah Khan	?
Education	Faiz Mohammad Khan Zikeria	1924 – 17 January 1929
Transcriptions	Haji Nizamuddin Khan	1919 – ?
Revenue	Mirza Mahmud	?
Revenue	Mir Muhammad Hashim	1922 – 17 January 1929
Health	did not exist until 1923	
Health	Mohammed Kabir Ludin	1923 – 17 January 1929
Minister of State for Frontier and Tribe Affairs	did not exist until March 1926	
Minister of State for Frontier and Tribe Affairs	Haji Muhammad Akbar	March 1926 – 17 January 1929

=== Saqqawist cabinet (1929) ===
Two days after King Inayatullah Khan abdicated his throne to Bacha-i-Saqao and his Saqqawist regime, the new rulers formed a cabinet, abolishing the Ministry of Trade, the General Directorate of Health, the Ministry of Education, the Ministry of Justice as well as other ministries.

Saqqawist cabinet
Portfolio	Name	Year(s)	Affiliation	Origin
Role
Prime Minister	unclear	19 January – 13 October 1929	Saqqawist	Tajik
Key ministries
Foreign Affairs	Ata al-Haqq	19 January – 13 October 1929	Saqqawist	Tajik
Defense	Sayyid Husayn	19 January – before 24 March 1929	Saqqawist	Tajik
Defense	Purdil Khan	before 24 March – 13 October 1929	Saqqawist	Tajik
Interior Affairs	Abd al-Ghafur Khan	19 January – 13 October 1929	Saqqawist	Tajik
Finance	Mirza Mujtaba Khan	19 January – 13 October 1929	Saqqawist	Tajik

=== First Hashim cabinet (1929–1933) ===
Hashim Cabinet
Portfolio	Name	Year(s)
Role
Prime Minister	Mohammad Hashim Khan	9 November 1929 – 8 November 1933
Key ministries
Foreign Affairs	Faiz Mohammad Khan Zikeria	9 November 1929 – 8 November 1933
War	Shah Mahmud Khan	9 November 1929 – 8 November 1933
Interior	Mohammad Hashim Khan	9 November 1929 – 1930
Interior	Mohammad Gul Khan Momand	1930 – 8 November 1933
Justice	Fazl Umar Mujaddidi	9 November 1929 – 1932
Justice	Fazl Ahmad Mujaddidi	1932 – 8 November 1933
Finance	Muhammad Ayyub	9 November 1929 – 8 November 1933
other ministries
Commerce	Haji Muhammad Akbar	9 November 1929 – 1931
Commerce	Mirza Muhammad Yaftali	1931 – 8 November 1933
Education	Ali Muhammad	9 November 1929 – 8 November 1933
Health	Muhammad Akbar	9 November 1929 – 8 November 1933
Posts, Telegraph and Telephone	did not exist until 1932	
Posts, Telegraph and Telephone	Rahimullah	1932 – 8 November 1933

=== Second Hashim cabinet (1933–1946) ===
Hashim Cabinet
Portfolio	Name	Year(s)
Role
Prime Minister	Mohammad Hashim Khan	8 November 1933 – 9 May 1946
First Deputy Prime Minister	did not exist until 1938	
First Deputy Prime Minister	Abdur Rahim Khan	1938 – 1940
First Deputy Prime Minister	Muhammad Naim	1940 – 9 May 1946
Second Deputy Prime Minister	did not exist until 1940	
Second Deputy Prime Minister	Abdur Rahim Khan	1940 – 9 May 1946
Key ministries
Foreign Affairs	Faiz Mohammad Khan Zikeria	8 November 1933 – 1939
Foreign Affairs	Ali Muhammad	1939 – 9 May 1946
War	Shah Mahmud Khan	8 November 1933 – 9 May 1946
Interior	Mohammad Gul Khan Momand	8 November 1933 – 1939
Interior	Ghulam Faruq Usman	1939 – 1942
Interior	Muhammad Nauruz	1942 – 1945
Interior	Ghulam Faruq Usman	1945 – 9 May 1946
Justice	Fazl Ahmad Mujaddidi	8 November 1933 – 1935
Justice	Aminullah Khan	1935 – 1945
Justice	Mir Ata Muhammad Husaini	1945 – 9 May 1946
Finance	Mirza Muhammad Yaftali	8 November 1933 – 1945
Finance	Muhammad Nauruz	1945 – 9 May 1946
other ministries
National Economy/Commerce	Mirza Muhammad Yaftali (Commerce)	8 November 1933 – 1938
National Economy/Commerce	Abdul Majid Zabuli (National Economy)	1938 – 9 May 1946
Education	Ahmad Ali Sulaiman	8 November 1933 – 1938
Education	Muhammad Naim	1938 – 9 May 1946
Public Works	Allah Nawaz	8 November 1933 – 1934
Public Works	Abdur Rahim Khan	1934 – 1938
Public Works	Abdul Hussain Aziz	1938 – 1941
Public Works	Rahimullah Khan	1941 – 1942
Public Works	Mohammed Kabir Ludin	1942 – 9 May 1946
Health	Muhammad Akbar	8 November 1933 – 1934
Health	Ghulam Yahya Tarzi	1934 – 1939
Health	vacant (First Deputy: Zulfiqar Khan)	1939 – 1945
Health	Sultan Ahmad	1945 – 9 May 1946
Posts, Telegraph and Telephone	Rahimullah	8 November 1933 – 1939
Posts, Telegraph and Telephone	Abdul Hussain Aziz	1939 – 1942
Posts, Telegraph and Telephone	vacant (First Deputy: Muhammad Hussain Daftari)	1942 – 1945
Posts, Telegraph and Telephone	Ghulam Yahya Tarzi	1945 – 9 May 1946
Mines	did not exist until 1937	
Mines	Muhammad Karim	1937 – 1939
Mines	Rahimullah Khan	1939 – 1945
Mines	Ghulam Muhammad Sherzad	1945 – 9 May 1946
Agriculture	did not exist until 1937	
Agriculture	Mir Muhammad Yusuf Khan	1937 – 9 May 1946
Press	did not exist until 1939	
Press	Salahuddin Saljuqi	1939 – 9 May 1946

=== Lewana cabinet (c. 1944–1946) ===
During the Afghan tribal revolts of 1944–1947, the rebelling Safi tribe established a rival government in the Eastern Province with its own cabinet under king Salemai. The offices were described by Amanul Mulk in 1983 in an interview published by David B. Edwards (2017). Because these offices are preserved by oral history, specific term dates are unavailable. The Safi revolt itself lasted from c. 1944 – c. 1946.

Lewana Cabinet
Portfolio	Name	Year(s)
Role
Prime Minister	Amanat Lewana	c. 1944 – c. 1946
Key ministries
Defense	Amanul Mulk	
"Minister"	Shahswar	

=== First Mahmud cabinet (1946–1950) ===
Mahmud Cabinet
Portfolio	Name	Year(s)
Role
Prime Minister	Shah Mahmud Khan	9 May 1946 – 14 October 1950
First Deputy Prime Minister	Muhammad Naim	9 May 1946 – 1948
First Deputy Prime Minister	Asadullah Seraj	1948 – 1949
First Deputy Prime Minister	Ali Muhammad	1949 – 14 October 1950
Second Deputy Prime Minister	Abdur Rahim Khan	9 May 1946 – 14 October 1950
Key ministries
Foreign Affairs	Ali Muhammad	9 May 1946 – 14 October 1950
War/Defense	Mohammad Daoud Khan	9 May 1946 – 1948
War/Defense	Muhammad Umar	1948 – 14 October 1950
Interior	Ghulam Faruq Usman	9 May 1946 – 1948
Interior	Asadullah Seraj	1948 – 1949
Interior	Mohammad Daoud Khan	1949 – 14 October 1950
Justice	Mir Ata Muhammad Husaini	9 May 1946 – 14 October 1950
Finance	Mir Muhammad Haidar Husaini	9 May 1946 – 14 October 1950
other ministries
National Economy	Abdul Majid Zabuli	9 May 1946 – 14 October 1950
Education	Najibullah Torwayana	9 May 1946 – 1949
Education	Abdul Hussain Aziz	1949 – 14 October 1950
Public Works	Mohammed Kabir Ludin	9 May 1946 – 14 October 1950
Health	Ahmad Ali Sulaiman	9 May 1946 – 1947
Health	Abdul Majid	1947 – 14 October 1950
Information	Abdullah Malikyar	9 May 1946 – 14 October 1950
Mines	Ghulam Muhammad Sherzad	9 May 1946 – 14 October 1950
Agriculture	Muhammad Atiq Rafiq	9 May 1946 – 14 October 1950
Press	Sayyid Qasim Rishtiya	9 May 1946 – 14 October 1950

=== Second Mahmud cabinet (1950–1953) ===
Mahmud Cabinet
Portfolio	Name	Year(s)
Role
Prime Minister	Shah Mahmud Khan	14 October 1950 – 7 September 1953
Prime Minister	vacant	7 – 20 September 1953
First Deputy Prime Minister	Ali Muhammad	14 October 1950 – 20 September 1953
Second Deputy Prime Minister	Abdur Rahim Khan	14 October 1950 – 20 September 1953
Key ministries
Foreign Affairs	Ali Muhammad	14 October 1950 – 18 March 1953
Foreign Affairs	Sultan Ahmad Khan Sherzoy	18 March – 20 September 1953
Defense	Mohammad Daoud Khan	14 October 1950 – 20 September 1953
Interior	Abdul Ahad Malikyar	14 October 1950 – 20 September 1953
Justice	Mir Sayyid Muhammad Qasim	14 October 1950 – 20 September 1953
Finance	Muhammad Nauruz	14 October 1950 – 20 September 1953
other ministries
National Economy	Mir Muhammad Haidar Husaini	14 October 1950 – 20 September 1953
Education	Abdul Majid	14 October 1950 – 20 September 1953
Public Works	Muhammad Akram Parwanta	14 October 1950 – 20 September 1953
Public Health	Ghulam Faruq	14 October 1950 – 20 September 1953
Post and Telegraph/ Communications	Ghulam Muhammad Sherzad	14 October 1950 – 1951
Post and Telegraph/ Communications	Ghulam Yahya Tarzi	1951 – 1952
Post and Telegraph/ Communications	Ghulam Muhammad Sherzad	1952 – 20 September 1953
Mines	Muhammad Naim Ziai	14 October 1950 – 20 September 1953
Agriculture	Amiruddin Shansab	14 October 1950 – 1951
Agriculture	Muhammad Zaman Taraki	1951 – 20 September 1953
Press & Information	Mohammad Hashim Maiwandwal	14 October 1950 – 20 September 1953
Tribal Affairs	Sayyid Shamsuddin Majruh	14 October 1950 – 20 September 1953

=== First Daoud cabinet (1953–1963) ===
Daoud Cabinet
Portfolio	Name	Year(s)
Role
Prime Minister	Mohammad Daoud Khan	20 September 1953 – 10 March 1963
Prime Minister	vacant	10 – 14 March 1963
First Deputy Prime Minister	Ali Muhammad	20 September 1953 – 14 March 1963
Second Deputy Prime Minister	Muhammad Naim	20 September 1953 – 14 March 1963
Key ministries
Foreign Affairs	Muhammad Naim	20 September 1953 – 14 March 1963
Defense	Mohammad Aref Khan	20 September 1953 – 6 December 1955
Defense	vacant	6 December 1955 – 1958
Defense	Mohammad Daoud Khan	1958 – 14 March 1963
Interior	Abdul Ahad Malikyar	20 September 1953 – 24 January 1956
Interior	Abdul Hakim Shah Alami	24 January 1956 – 1958
Interior	Sayyid Abdullah	1958 – 14 March 1963
Justice	Mir Sayyid Muhammad Qasim	20 September 1953 – 24 January 1956
Justice	Sayyid Abdullah (acting)	24 January 1956 – 14 March 1963
Finance	Abdul Malik Abdul-Rahim-Zai (acting)	20 September 1953 – 1957
Finance	Abdullah Malikyar	1957 – 14 March 1963
other ministries
National Economy	Abdul Rauf Haidar	20 September 1953 – 1954
National Economy	Abdul Malik Abdul-Rahim-Zai (acting)	1954 – 1956
National Economy	Abdullah Malikyar	1956 – 1957
National Economy	Ghulam Muhammad Sherzad	1957 – 14 March 1963
Education	Abdul Majid	20 September 1953 – 1957
Education	Ali Ahmad Popal	1957 – 14 March 1963
Public Works	Abdul Hakim Shah Alami	20 September 1953 – 1955
Public Works	Mohammed Kabir Ludin	1955 – 14 March 1963
Health	Ghulam Faruq	20 September 1953 – 24 January 1956
Health	Abdul Zahir (acting)	24 January 1956 – 14 March 1963
Post and Telegraph/ Communications	Abdul Hakim Shah Alami	20 September 1953 – 1954
Post and Telegraph/ Communications	Muhammad Murid	1954 – 14 March 1963
Mines	Mohammad Yusuf	20 September 1953 – 14 March 1963
Agriculture	Mir Muhammad Yusuf	20 September 1953 – 1958
Agriculture	Ghulam Haidar Adalat	1958 – 1962
Agriculture	Muhammad Nasir Keshawarz	1962 – 14 March 1963
Press	Salahuddin Saljuqi	20 September 1953 – 1955
Press	Mohammad Hashim Maiwandwal	1955 – 1956
Press	Abdul Satar Shalizi (acting)	1956 – 1958
Press	Sayyid Qasim Rishtiya	1958 – 1960
Press	Muhammad Asef Suhail	1960 – 14 March 1963
Tribal Affairs	Sayyid Shamsuddin Majruh	20 September 1953 – 14 March 1963
Planning	did not exist until 1957	
Planning	Mohammad Daoud Khan	1957 – 14 March 1963

=== Interim Yusuf cabinet (1963–1965) ===
Yusuf Cabinet
Portfolio	Name	Year(s)
Role
Prime Minister	Mohammad Yusuf	14 March 1963 – 29 October 1965
Prime Minister	vacant	29 October – 2 November 1965
(First) Deputy Prime Minister	Abdullah Malikyar (First Deputy)	14 March 1963 – 7 July 1964
(First) Deputy Prime Minister	vacant	7 July – 30 September 1964
(First) Deputy Prime Minister	Abdul Zahir (Deputy)	30 September 1964 – 25 October 1965
(First) Deputy Prime Minister	Sayyid Shamsuddin Majruh (Deputy)	25 October – 2 November 1965
Second Deputy Prime Minister	Ali Ahmad Popal	14 March 1963 – 7 July 1964
Second Deputy Prime Minister	position was discarded on 7 July 1964	
Key ministries
Foreign Affairs	Mohammad Yusuf	14 March 1963 – 2 November 1965
National Defense	Khan Mohammad Khan	14 March 1963 – 2 November 1965
Interior	Sayyid Abdullah	14 March – 23 May 1963
Interior	Abdul Kayeum	23 May 1963 – 25 October 1965
Interior	Mohammad Husain Messa	25 October – 2 November 1965
Justice	Sayyid Shamsuddin Majruh	14 March 1963 – 25 October 1965
Justice	vacant	25 October – 2 November 1965
Finance	Abdullah Malikyar	14 March 1963 – 7 July 1964
Finance	Sayyid Qasim Rishtiya	7 July 1964 – 25 October 1965
Finance	Abdullah Yaftali	25 October – 2 November 1965
other ministries
Commerce	vacant	14 March – 20 October 1963
Commerce	Mohammad Sawar Omar	20 October 1963 – 2 November 1965
Commerce	Nour Ali	25 October – 2 November 1965
Education	Ali Ahmad Popal	14 March 1963 – 7 July 1964
Education	Mohammad Anas	7 July 1964 – 2 November 1965
Public Works	Mohammad Azim	14 March 1963 – 2 November 1965
Public Works	Ghulam Dastagir Azizi	25 October – 2 November 1965
Public Health	Abdur Rahim	14 March 1963 – 30 September 1964
Public Health	Abdul Zahir	30 September 1964 – 2 November 1965
Public Health	Abdul Majid	25 October – 2 November 1965
Communications	Abdul Kayeum	14 March – 12 November 1963
Communications	Mohammad Haider	12 November 1963 – 2 November 1965
Mines and Industries	Mohammad Yusuf	14 March – 12 November 1963
Mines and Industries	Mohammad Husain Messa	12 November 1963 – 25 October 1965
Mines and Industries	vacant	25 October – 2 November 1965
Agriculture	Mohammad Nasir Keshawarz	14 March 1963 – 25 October 1965
Agriculture	Mir Mohammad Akbar Reza	25 October – 2 November 1965
Press and Information	Sayyid Qasim Rishtiya	14 March 1963 – 19 December 1964
Press and Information	Mohammad Hashim Maiwandwal	19 December 1964 – 2 November 1965
Tribal Affairs	Sayyid Shamsuddin Majruh	14 March – 25 April 1963
Tribal Affairs	Gul Pacha Ulfat	25 April 1963 – 25 October 1965
Tribal Affairs	vacant	25 October – 2 November 1965
Planning	Abdul Hai Aziz	14 March – 20 October 1963
Planning	Abdullah Yaftali	20 October 1963 – 25 October 1965
Planning	Abdul Samad Hamed	25 October – 2 November 1965

=== Maiwandwal cabinet (1965–1967) ===
Maiwandwal Cabinet
Portfolio	Name	Year(s)
Role
Prime Minister	Mohammad Hashim Maiwandwal	2 November 1965 – 11 October 1967
Prime Minister	Abdullah Yaftali (acting)	11 October – 15 November 1967
First Deputy Prime Minister	vacant	2 November 1965 – 20 June 1966
First Deputy Prime Minister	Nur Ahmad Etemadi	20 June 1966 – 15 November 1967
Second Deputy Prime Minister	vacant	2 November 1965 – 20 June 1966
Second Deputy Prime Minister	Abdul Satar Shalizi	20 June 1966 – 15 November 1967
Key ministries
Foreign Affairs	Nur Ahmad Etemadi	2 November 1965 – 15 November 1967
National Defense	Khan Mohammad Khan	2 November 1965 – 15 November 1967
Interior	Abdul Satar Shalizi	2 November 1965 – 26 January 1967
Interior	Ahmadullah	26 January – 15 November 1967
Justice	Abdul Hakim Tabibi	2 November 1965 – 17 August 1966
Justice	Mohammad Haider	17 August 1966 – 27 July 1967
Justice	Mohammad Ehsan Taraki	17 July – 15 November 1967
Finance	Abdullah Yaftali	2 November 1965 – 26 January 1967
Finance	Abdul Karim Hakimi	26 January – 15 November 1967
other ministries
Commerce	Nour Ali	2 November 1965 – 15 November 1967
Education	Mohammad Hashim Maiwandwal	2 November – 1 December 1965
Education	Mohammad Osman Anwari	1 December 1965 – 15 November 1967
Public Works	Ahmadullah	2 November 1965 – 26 January 1967
Public Works	Mohammad Husain Messa	26 January – 15 November 1967
Public Health	Mohammad Osman Anwari	2 November – 1 December 1965
Public Health	Kubra Noorzai	1 December 1965 – 15 November 1967
Communications	Mohammad Haider	2 November 1965 – 17 August 1966
Communications	Abdul Karim Hakimi	17 August 1966 – 26 January 1967
Communications	Mohammad Azim Gran (acting)	26 January – 15 November 1967
Mines and Industries	Abdul Samad Salim	2 November 1965 – 15 November 1967
Agriculture	Mir Mohammad Akbar Reza	2 November 1965 – 15 November 1967
Press and Information/ Information and Culture	Mohammad Hashim Maiwandwal (Press and Information)	2 November – 1 December 1965
Press and Information/ Information and Culture	Mohammad Osman Sidqi (Press and Information)	1 December 1965 – 13 June 1967
Press and Information/ Information and Culture	Abdul Rauf Benawa (Information and Culture)	13 June – 15 November 1967
Tribal Affairs	vacant	2 November – 1 December 1965
Tribal Affairs	Mohammed Khalid Roashan	1 December 1965 – 15 November 1967
Planning	vacant	2 November – 1 December 1965
Planning	Abdul Hakim Ziayee	1 December 1965 – 27 July 1967
Planning	Abdullah Yaftali	27 July – 15 November 1967
Minister without portfolio	Abdullah Yaftali	26 January – 27 July 1967
Minister without portfolio	Mohammad Anas	27 July – 15 November 1967
Secretary of the Council of Ministers	Abdul Ghafoor Ravan Farhadi	2 November 1965 – 15 November 1967

=== First Etemadi cabinet (1967–1969) ===
Etemadi Cabinet
Portfolio	Name	Year(s)
Role
Prime Minister	Nur Ahmad Etemadi	15 November 1967 – 2 December 1969
First Deputy Prime Minister	Ali Ahmad Popal	15 November 1967 – 28 June 1969
First Deputy Prime Minister	vacant	28 June – 2 December 1969
Second Deputy Prime Minister	Abdullah Yaftali	15 November 1967 – 2 December 1969
Key ministries
Foreign Affairs	Nur Ahmad Etemadi	15 November 1967 – 2 December 1969
National Defense	Khan Mohammad Khan	15 November 1967 – 2 December 1969
Interior	Mohammad Omar Wardak	15 November 1967 – 23 June 1969
Interior	Mohammad Bashir Lodin (acting)	23 June – 2 December 1969
Justice	Mohammad Asghar	15 November 1967 – 2 December 1969
Finance	Mohammad Anwar Ziayee	15 November 1967 – 2 December 1969
other ministries
Commerce	Nour Ali	15 November 1967 – 2 December 1969
Education	Ali Ahmad Popal	15 November 1967 – 19 November 1968
Education	vacant	19 November 1968 – 3 March 1969
Education	Mohammad Akram	3 March – 2 December 1969
Public Works	Mohammad Husain Messa	15 November 1967 – 2 December 1969
Public Health	Kubra Noorzai	15 November 1967 – 2 December 1969
Communications	Mohammad Azim Gran	15 November 1967 – 2 December 1969
Mines and Industries	Abdul Samad Salim	15 November 1967 – Summer 1968
Mines and Industries	Mohammad Husain Messa	Summer 1968 – 2 December 1969
Agriculture and Irrigation	Mir Mohammad Akbar Reza	15 November 1967 – 2 December 1969
Information and Culture	Mohammad Anas	15 November 1967 – 2 December 1969
Tribal Affairs	Sayyid Masood Pohanyar	15 November 1967 – 2 December 1969
Planning	Abdul Samad Hamed	15 November 1967 – 2 December 1969
Minister without portfolio	Abdul Wahid Sorabi	15 November 1967 – 2 December 1969

=== Second Etemadi cabinet (1969–1971) ===
Etemadi Cabinet
Portfolio	Name	Year(s)
Role
Prime Minister	Nur Ahmad Etemadi	2 December 1969 – 26 July 1971
First Deputy Prime Minister	Abdullah Yaftali	2 December 1969 – 26 July 1971
Second Deputy Prime Minister	Abdul Kayeum	2 December 1969 – 26 July 1971
Key ministries
Foreign Affairs	Nur Ahmad Etemadi	2 December 1969 – 26 July 1971
National Defense	Khan Mohammad Khan	2 December 1969 – 26 July 1971
Interior	Mohammad Bashir Lodin	2 December 1969 – 26 July 1971
Justice	Abdul Satar Sirat	2 December 1969 – 26 July 1971
Finance	Mohammad Aman	2 December 1969 – 26 July 1971
other ministries
Commerce	Mohammad Akbar Omar	2 December 1969 – 26 July 1971
Education	Abdul Kayeum	2 December 1969 – 26 July 1971
Public Works	Mohammad Yaqub Lali	2 December 1969 – 26 July 1971
Public Health	Ibrahim Majid Seraj	2 December 1969 – 26 July 1971
Communications	Mohammad Azim Gran	2 December 1969 – 26 July 1971
Mines and Industries	Amanullah Mansoori	2 December 1969 – 26 July 1971
Agriculture and Irrigation	Abdul Hakim	2 December 1969 – 26 July 1971
Information and Culture	Mahmoud Habibi	2 December 1969 – 26 July 1971
Tribal Affairs	Sayyid Masood Pohanyar	2 December 1969 – 26 July 1971
Planning	Abdul Wahid Sorabi	2 December 1969 – 26 July 1971
Minister without portfolio	Shafiqa Ziayee	2 December 1969 – 26 July 1971
Minister without portfolio	Ghulam Ali Ayeen	2 December 1969 – 26 July 1971

=== Zahir cabinet (1971–1972) ===
Zahir Cabinet
Portfolio	Name	Year(s)
Role
Prime Minister	Abdul Zahir	26 July 1971 – 12 December 1972
Deputy Prime Minister	Abdul Samad Hamed	26 July 1971 – 12 December 1972
Key ministries
Foreign Affairs	Mohammad Musa Shafiq	26 July 1971 – 12 December 1972
National Defense	Khan Mohammad Khan	26 July 1971 – 12 December 1972
Interior	Amanullah Mansoori	26 July 1971 – 12 December 1972
Justice	Mohammad Anwar Arghandiwal	26 July 1971 – 12 December 1972
Finance	Ghulam Haidar Dawar	26 July 1971 – 12 December 1972
other ministries
Commerce	Mohammad Aref Ghausi	26 July 1971 – 12 December 1972
Education	Hamidullah Enayat Seraj	26 July 1971 – 12 April 1972
Education	Mohammad Yasin Azim (acting)	12 April – 12 December 1972
Public Works	Khwazak Zalmai	26 July 1971 – 12 December 1972
Public Health	Ibrahim Majid Seraj	26 July 1971 – 12 December 1972
Communications	Nasratullah Malikyar	26 July 1971 – 12 December 1972
Mines and Industries	Mohammad Yaqub Lali	26 July 1971 – 12 December 1972
Agriculture and Irrigation	Abdul Hakim	26 July 1971 – 12 December 1972
Information and Culture	Mohammad Ibrahim Abbasi	26 July 1971 – 12 December 1972
Tribal Affairs	Abdul Samad Hamed (temporarily)	26 July 1971 – 15 April 1972
Tribal Affairs	Mohammad Ayub Aziz	15 April – 12 December 1972
Planning	Abdul Wahid Sorabi	26 July 1971 – 12 December 1972
Minister without portfolio	Shafiqa Ziayee	26 July 1971 – 12 December 1972
Minister without portfolio	Abdul Wakil	26 July 1971 – 12 December 1972
Minister without portfolio	Abdul Satar Sirat	26 July 1971 – 12 December 1972

=== Shafiq cabinet (1972–1973) ===
Shafiq Cabinet
Portfolio	Name	Year(s)
Role
Prime Minister	Mohammad Musa Shafiq	12 December 1972 – 17 July 1973
Deputy Prime Minister	vacant	12 December 1972 – 17 July 1973
Key ministries
Foreign Affairs	Mohammad Musa Shafiq	12 December 1972 – 17 July 1973
National Defense	Khan Mohammad Khan	12 December 1972 – 17 July 1973
Interior	Nematullah Pazhwak	12 December 1972 – 17 July 1973
Justice	Samiuddin Zhwand (caretaker)	12 December 1972 – 17 July 1973
Finance	Mohammad Khan Jalalar	12 December 1972 – 17 July 1973
other ministries
Commerce	Ali Nawaz (caretaker)	12 December 1972 – 17 July 1973
Education	Mohammad Yasin Azim	12 December 1972 – 17 July 1973
Public Works	Khwazak Zalmai	12 December 1972 – 17 July 1973
Public Health	Muhammad Akhtar Khoshbin (caretaker)	12 December 1972 – 17 July 1973
Communications	Nasratullah Malikyar	12 December 1972 – 17 July 1973
Mines and Industries	Ghulam Dastagir Azizi	12 December 1972 – 17 July 1973
Agriculture and Irrigation	Abdul Wakil	12 December 1972 – 17 July 1973
Information and Culture	Sabahuddin Kushkaki	12 December 1972 – 17 July 1973
Tribal Affairs	Mohammad Gulab Nangarhari (caretaker)	12 December 1972 – 17 July 1973
Planning	Abdul Wahid Sorabi	12 December 1972 – 17 July 1973
Minister without portfolio	vacant	12 December 1972 – 17 July 1973

== Republic (1973–1978) ==
=== Second Daoud cabinet (1973–1975) ===
Daoud Cabinet
Portfolio	Name	Year(s)
Role
President and Prime Minister	Mohammad Daoud Khan	17 July 1973 – 28 September 1975
Deputy Prime Minister	Mohammad Hasan Sharq	2 August 1973 – 28 September 1975
Key ministries
Foreign Affairs	Mohammad Daoud Khan	2 August 1973 – 28 September 1975
National Defense	Mohammad Daoud Khan	2 August 1973 – 28 September 1975
Interior	Faiz Mohammed	2 August 1973 – 28 September 1975
Justice	Abdul Majid	2 August 1973 – 28 September 1975
Finance	Sayyid Abdulillah	2 August 1973 – 28 September 1975
other ministries
Commerce	Mohammad Khan Jalalar	2 August 1973 – 28 September 1975
Education	Nematullah Pazhwak	2 August 1973 – 19 December 1974
Education	Abdul Kayeum	19 December 1974 – 28 September 1975
Public Works	Ghausuddin Fayeq	2 August 1973 – 28 September 1975
Public Health	Nazar Mohammad Sekandar	2 August 1973 – 28 September 1975
Communications	Abdul Hamid Mohtat	2 August 1973 – 22 April 1974
Communications	Azizullah Zayer (acting)	22 April 1974 – 28 September 1975
Mines and Industries	Abdul Kayeum	2 August 1973 – 28 September 1975
Agriculture and Irrigation	Ghulam Jilani Bakhtari	2 August 1973 – 28 September 1975
Information and Culture	Abdul Rahim Nevin	2 August 1973 – 28 September 1975
Frontier Affairs	Pacha Gul Wafadar	2 August 1973 – 24 March 1974
Frontier Affairs	vacant	24 March 1974 – 28 September 1975
Planning	Ali Ahmad Khurram	2 August 1973 – 28 September 1975

=== Third Daoud cabinet (1975–1977) ===
Daoud Cabinet
Portfolio	Name	Year(s)
Role
President and Prime Minister	Mohammad Daoud Khan	28 September 1975 – 19 March 1977
(First) Deputy Prime Minister	Mohammad Hasan Sharq	28 September 1975 – 19 March 1977
Second Deputy Prime Minister	Sayyid Abdulillah	28 September 1975 – 19 March 1977
Key ministries
Foreign Affairs	Mohammad Daoud Khan	28 September 1975 – 19 March 1977
National Defense	Mohammad Daoud Khan	28 September 1975 – 19 March 1977
Interior	Abdul Qadir Nuristani	28 September 1975 – 19 March 1977
Justice	Abdul Majid	28 September 1975 – 19 March 1977
Finance	Sayyid Abdulillah	28 September 1975 – 19 March 1977
other ministries
Commerce	Mohammad Khan Jalalar	28 September 1975 – 19 March 1977
Education	Abdul Kayeum	28 September 1975 – 19 March 1977
Public Works	Ghausuddin Fayeq	28 September 1975 – 19 March 1977
Public Health	Nazar Mohammad Sekandar	28 September 1975 – 19 March 1977
Communications	Abdul Karim Atayi	28 September 1975 – 19 March 1977
Mines and Industries	Abdul Tawab Asefi	28 September 1975 – 19 March 1977
Agriculture and Irrigation	Azizullah Wasefi	28 September 1975 – 19 March 1977
Information and Culture	Abdul Rahim Nevin	28 September 1975 – 19 March 1977
Frontier Affairs	Faiz Mohammed	28 September 1975 – 19 March 1977
Planning	Ali Ahmad Khurram	28 September 1975 – 19 March 1977

=== Fourth Daoud cabinet (1977–1978) ===
Daoud Cabinet
Portfolio	Name	Year(s)
Role
President and Prime Minister	Mohammad Daoud Khan	19 March 1977 – 28 April 1978
Deputy Prime Minister	Mohammad Hasan Sharq	19 March 1977 – 28 April 1978
Key ministries
Foreign Affairs	Mohammad Daoud Khan	19 March 1977 – 28 April 1978
National Defense	Ghulam Haidar Rasuli	19 March 1977 – 28 April 1978
Interior	Abdul Qadir Nuristani	19 March 1977 – 28 April 1978
Justice	Wafiullah Samyee	19 March 1977 – 28 April 1978
Finance	Sayyid Abdulillah	19 March 1977 – 28 April 1978
other ministries
Commerce	Mohammad Khan Jalalar	19 March 1977 – 28 April 1978
Education	Ibrahim Majid Seraj	19 March 1977 – 28 April 1978
Higher Education	Ghulam Siddiq Muhibbi	19 March 1977 – 28 April 1978
Public Works	Ghausuddin Fayeq	19 March 1977 – 28 April 1978
Public Health	Abdullah Omar	19 March 1977 – 28 April 1978
Communications	Abdul Karim Atayi	19 March 1977 – 28 April 1978
Mines and Industries	Abdul Tawab Asefi	19 March 1977 – 28 April 1978
Agriculture and Irrigation	Azizullah Wasefi	19 March 1977 – 28 April 1978
Water and Energy	Juma Muhammad Muhammadi	19 March 1977 – 28 April 1978
Information and Culture	Abdul Rahim Nevin	19 March 1977 – 28 April 1978
Border Affairs	Abdul Kayeum	19 March 1977 – 28 April 1978
Planning	Ali Ahmad Khurram	19 March – 16 November 1977
Planning	Abdul Aziz Ferough (acting)	16 November 1977 – 28 April 1978
Minister without portfolio and Minister of State	Abdul Majid	19 March 1977 – 28 April 1978

== Democratic Republic / Second Republic (1978–1992) ==
=== Taraki Council of Ministers (1978–1979) ===
Taraki Council of Ministers
Portfolio	Name	Year(s)
Role
Prime Minister	Nur Muhammad Taraki	30 April 1978 – 27 March 1979
Prime Minister	Hafizullah Amin	27 – 31 March 1979
Deputy Prime Minister	Babrak Karmal	30 April – 5 July 1978
Deputy Prime Minister	Hafizullah Amin	30 April 1978 – 27 March 1979
Deputy Prime Minister	Mohammad Aslam Watanjar	30 April 1978 – 31 March 1979
Key ministries
Foreign Affairs	Hafizullah Amin	30 April 1978 – 31 March 1979
National Defense	Abdul Qadir	30 April – 17 August 1978
National Defense	Nur Ahmad Taraki	17 August 1978 – 31 March 1979
Interior	Nur Ahmed Nur	30 April – 5 July 1978
Justice	Abdul Hakim Sharayee Jauzjani	30 April 1978 – 31 March 1979
Finance	Abdul Karim Misaq	30 April 1978 – 31 March 1979
other ministries
Commerce	Abdul Quddus Ghorbandi	30 April 1978 – 31 March 1979
Education	Ghulam Dastagir Panjsheri	30 April – 28 August 1978
Education	Abdul Rashid Jalili	28 August 1978 – 31 March 1979
Higher Education	Mahmud Suma	30 April 1978 – 31 March 1979
Public Works	Mohammed Rafie	30 April – 23 August 1978
Public Works	vacant	23 – 28 August 1978
Public Works	Ghulam Dastagir Panjsheri	28 August 1978 – 31 March 1979
Public Health	Akbar Shah Wali	30 April 1978 – 31 March 1979
Communications	Mohammad Aslam Watanjar	30 April 1978 – 31 March 1979
Mines and Industries	Mohammad Ismail Danish	30 April 1978 – 31 March 1979
Agriculture	Saleh Mohammad Zeary	30 April 1978 – 31 March 1979
Water and Power	Mohammad Mansur Hashemi	30 April 1978 – 31 March 1979
Information and Culture	Mohammed Hassan Bareq Shafiee	30 April 1978 – 31 March 1979
Radio and Television	Sulaiman Layeq	30 April – 29 November 1978
Radio and Television	was merged with the Ministry of Information and Culture on 29 November 1978	
Frontier Affairs	Nizamuddin Tahzib	30 April – 28 August 1978
Frontier Affairs	Sahibjan Sahrayi	28 August 1978 – 31 March 1979
Planning	Sultan Ali Keshtmand	30 April – 23 August 1978
Planning	Muhammad Sediq Alemyar	23 August 1978 – 31 March 1979
Social	Anahita Ratebzad	30 April – 12 July 1978
Social	was discarded on 12 July 1978	

=== Amin Council of Ministers (1979) ===
Amin Council of Ministers
Portfolio	Name	Year(s)
Role
First Minister	Hafizullah Amin	31 March – 27 December 1979
Deputy First Minister	Akbar Shah Wali	31 March – 27 December 1979
Key ministries
Foreign Affairs	Hafizullah Amin	31 March – 28 July 1979
Foreign Affairs	Akbar Shah Wali	28 July – 27 December 1979
Defense	Mohammad Aslam Watanjar	31 March – 28 July 1979
Defense	Hafizullah Amin (caretaker)	28 July – 27 December 1979
Interior	Sherjan Mazdooryar	31 March – 28 July 1979
Interior	Mohammad Aslam Watanjar	28 July – 14 September 1979
Interior	Faqir Mohammad Faqir	14 September – 27 December 1979
Justice	Abdul Hakim Sharayee Jauzjani	31 March – 27 December 1979
Finance	Abdul Karim Misaq	31 March – 27 December 1979
other ministries
Commerce	Abdul Quddus Ghorbandi	31 March – 27 December 1979
Education	Abdul Rashid Jalili	31 March – 28 July 1979
Education	Muhammad Salim Masudi	28 July – 27 December 1979
Higher Education	Mahmud Suma	31 March – 27 December 1979
Public Works	Ghulam Dastagir Panjsheri	31 March – 27 December 1979
Public Health	Akbar Shah Wali	31 March – 28 July 1979
Public Health	Saleh Mohammad Zeary	28 July – 27 December 1979
Communications	Sayed Mohammad Gulabzoy	31 March – 14 September 1979
Communications	Mohammad Zarif	14 September – 27 December 1979
Mines and Industries	Mohammad Ismail Danish	31 March – 27 December 1979
Agriculture and Land Reforms	Saleh Mohammad Zeary	31 March – 28 July 1979
Agriculture and Land Reforms	Abdul Rashid Jalili	28 July – 27 December 1979
Water and Power	Mohammad Mansur Hashemi	31 March – 27 December 1979
Information and Culture	Mohammad Katawazi	31 March – 27 December 1979
Frontier Affairs	Sahib Jan Sahraee	31 March – 28 July 1979
Frontier Affairs	Sherjan Mazdooryar	28 July – 14 September 1979
Frontier Affairs	Sahib Jan Sahraee	14 September – 27 December 1979
Planning Affairs	Muhammad Sediq Alemyar	31 March – 27 December 1979
Transport	Mohammed Hassan Bareq Shafiee	31 March – 27 December 1979
Minister without portfolio	did not exist until 28 July 1979	
Minister without portfolio	Sahib Jan Sahraee	28 July – 14 September 1979
Minister without portfolio	was dissolved on 14 September 1979	

=== Karmal Council of Ministers (1979–1981) ===
Karmal Council of Ministers
Portfolio	Name	Year(s)
Role
Prime Minister	Babrak Karmal	27 December 1979 – 11 June 1981
Deputy Prime Minister	Assadullah Sarwari	27 December 1979 – 11 June 1981
Deputy Prime Minister	Sultan Ali Keshtmand	27 December 1979 – 11 June 1981
Deputy Prime Minister	Abdul Rashid Arian	16 August 1980 – 11 June 1981
Key ministries
Foreign Affairs	Shah Mohammad Dost	27 December 1979 – 11 June 1981
Defense	Mohammed Rafie	27 December 1979 – 11 June 1981
Interior	Sayed Mohammad Gulabzoy	27 December 1979 – 11 June 1981
Justice	vacant	27 December 1979 – 10 January 1980
Justice	Abdul Rashid Arian	10 January 1980 – 11 June 1981
Finance	Abdul Wakil	27 December 1979 – 11 June 1981
other ministries
Commerce	Mohammad Khan Jalalar	27 December 1979 – 11 June 1981
Education	Anahita Ratebzad	27 December 1979 – 11 June 1981
Higher Education	vacant	27 December 1979 – 10 January 1980
Higher Education	Gul Dad	10 January 1980 – 11 June 1981
Public Works	vacant	27 December 1979 – 10 January 1980
Public Works	Nazar Mohammad	10 January 1980 – 11 June 1981
Public Health	vacant	27 December 1979 – 10 January 1980
Public Health	Mohammad Ibrahim Azim	10 January 1980 – 11 June 1981
Communications	vacant	27 December 1979 – 10 January 1980
Communications	Mohammad Aslam Watanjar	10 January 1980 – 11 June 1981
Mines and Industries	vacant	27 December 1979 – 10 January 1980
Mines and Industries	Mohammad Ismail Danish	10 January 1980 – 11 June 1981
Agriculture and Land Reforms	vacant	27 December 1979 – 10 January 1980
Agriculture and Land Reforms	Fazl Rahim Mohmand	10 January 1980 – 11 June 1981
Water and Power	vacant	27 December 1979 – 10 January 1980
Water and Power	Raz Mohammad Paktin	10 January 1980 – 11 June 1981
Information and Culture	vacant	27 December 1979 – 10 January 1980
Information and Culture	Abdul Majid Sarbuland	10 January 1980 – 11 June 1981
Border Affairs	Faiz Mohammed	27 December 1979 – 11 September 1980
Border Affairs	unknown	11 September 1980 – 11 June 1981
Planning Affairs	Sultan Ali Keshtmand	27 December 1979 – 11 June 1981
Transport	Sherjan Mazdooryar	27 December 1979 – 11 June 1981

=== First Keshtmand Council of Ministers (1981–1988) ===
Keshtmand Council of Ministers
Portfolio	Name	Year(s)
Role
Chairman of the Council of Ministers	Sultan Ali Keshtmand	11 June 1981 – 26 May 1988
Chairman of the Council of Ministers	Mohammad Hasan Sharq	26 May – 16 June 1988
First Deputy Chairman	did not exist until 4 December 1986	
First Deputy Chairman	Nazar Mohammad	4 December 1986 – 16 June 1988
Deputy Chairman	Gul Dad	11 June 1981 – November 1986; before 7 July 1987 – 16 June 1988
Deputy Chairman	Abdul Majid Sarbuland	11 June 1981 – September 1986
Deputy Chairman	Khalil Ahmad Abawi	1 April 1982 – 18 October 1983
Deputy Chairman	Abdul Rashid Arian	before 13 October 1982 – 16 June 1988
Deputy Chairman	Mohammed Rafie	25 September 1982 – after 15 September 1986
Deputy Chairman	Sarwar Mangal	18 October 1983 – after 10 January 1986
Deputy Chairman	Sayed Mohammad Nasim Mayhanparast	30 November 1985 – 16 June 1988
Deputy Chairman	Sayed Amanuddin Amin	26 December 1985 – 16 June 1988
Deputy Chairman	Mohammad Aziz	before 15 September 1986 – 16 June 1988
Deputy Chairman	Mohammad Hakim	before 8 January 1987 – 16 June 1988
Deputy Chairman	Abdul Hamid Mohtat	June 1987 – 16 June 1988
Deputy Chairman	Mohammad Hasan Sharq	June 1987 – 26 May 1988
Deputy Chairman	Mahbubullah Koshani	before 2 November 1987 – 16 June 1988
Key ministries
Foreign Affairs	Shah Mohammad Dost	11 June 1981 – 4 December 1986
Foreign Affairs	Abdul Wakil	4 December 1986 – 16 June 1988
Defense	Mohammed Rafie	11 June 1981 – January 1982
Defense	Abdul Qadir	January 1982 – 4 December 1984
Defense	Nazar Mohammad	4 December 1984 – 4 December 1986
Defense	Mohammed Rafie	4 December 1986 – 16 June 1988
Interior	Sayed Mohammad Gulabzoy	11 June 1981 – 16 June 1988
State Security	did not exist until 4 May 1986	
State Security	Ghulam Faruq Yaqubi	4 May 1986 – 16 June 1988
Justice	Abdul Wahab Safi	11 June 1981 – 18 October 1983
Justice	Muhammad Bashir Baghlani	18 October 1983 – 16 June 1988
Finance	Abdul Wakil	11 June 1981 – July 1984
Finance	Mohammad Kabir	July 1984 – 16 June 1988
other ministries
Commerce	Mohammad Khan Jalalar	11 June 1981 – 16 June 1988
Light Industries and Foodstuffs	was founded between 16 March and 12 April 1984	
Light Industries and Foodstuffs	Mohammad Aziz	before 12 April 1984 – after 10 January 1986
Light Industries and Foodstuffs	Lemar Ahmad Lemar	June 1986 – before 4 January 1988
Light Industries and Foodstuffs	Najibullah Masir	before 4 January – 16 June 1988
Domestic Trade	was not established before 2 November 1987	
Domestic Trade	vacant	before 2 November 1987 – 16 June 1988
Foreign Trade	was not established before 2 November 1987	
Foreign Trade	vacant	before 2 November 1987 – 16 June 1988
Education	Faqir Mohammad Yaqubi	11 June 1981 – 7 April 1983
Education	Abdul Samad Qayumi	7 April 1983 – 16 June 1988
Higher and Vocational Education/ Higher Education	Gul Dad	11 June 1981 – 12 September 1982
Higher and Vocational Education/ Higher Education	Sarwar Mangal	12 September 1982 – 18 October 1983
Higher and Vocational Education/ Higher Education	Burhanuddin Ghiasi	18 October 1983 – before 4 January 1988
Higher and Vocational Education/ Higher Education	Abdul Wahid Sorabi	before 4 January – 16 June 1988
Vocational Education	split up from the Ministry of Higher and Vocational Education before 2 November 1987	
Vocational Education	vacant	before 2 November 1987 – before 4 January 1988
Vocational Education	Mohammad Israel Rasi	before 4 January – 16 June 1988
Public Works	Nazar Mohammad	11 June 1981 – 16 June 1988
Public Health	Mohammad Ibrahim Azim	11 June 1981 – May 1982
Public Health	Ghulam Nabi Kamyar	May 1982 – March 1987
Public Health	Sher Bahadur	March 1987 – 16 June 1988
Communications	Mohammad Aslam Watanjar	11 June 1981 – 16 June 1988
Mines and Industries	Mohammad Ismail Danish	11 June 1981 – before 17 July 1985
Mines and Industries	Najibullah Masir	before 17 July 1985 – 30 October 1987
Mines and Industries	Mohammad Ishaq Kawa	30 October 1987 – 16 June 1988
Agriculture and Land Reforms	Fazl Rahim Mohmand	11 June 1981 – 28 August 1982
Agriculture and Land Reforms	Abdul Ghafar Lakanwal	28 August 1982 – before 7 July 1987
Agriculture and Land Reforms	Ghulam Faruq Kobakiwal	before 7 July 1987 – 16 June 1988
Irrigation	was founded between 12 May and 15 July 1982	
Irrigation	Ahmad Shah Sorkhabi	before 15 July 1982 – 16 June 1988
Water and Power	Raz Mohammad Paktin	11 June 1981 – 16 June 1988
Information and Culture	Abdul Majid Sarbuland	11 June 1981 – 12 September 1982
Information and Culture	was dissolved on 12 September 1982	
Tribes and Nationalities/ Tribal and Border Affairs	Sulaiman Layeq	11 June 1981 – 16 June 1988
Nationalities	split up from the Ministry of Tribes and Nationalities on 29 October 1987	
Nationalities	vacant	29 October 1987 – before 4 January 1988
Nationalities	Mohammad Akbar Shormach	before 4 January – 16 June 1988
Returnees Affairs	did not exist before June 1987	
Returnees Affairs	Mohammad Hasan Sharq	June 1987 – 16 June 1988
Planning Affairs	Sultan Ali Keshtmand	11 June 1981 – 18 October 1983
Planning Affairs	Sarwar Mangal	18 October 1983 – 16 June 1988
Transport	Sherjan Mazdooryar	11 June 1981 – 16 June 1988
Civil Aviation	did not exist before 29 August 1986	
Civil Aviation	Mohammad Aziz Negahban	29 August 1986 – 16 June 1988
Islamic Affairs and Endowment	was founded in April 1985	
Islamic Affairs and Endowment	Abdul Wali Hojat	April 1985 – October 1986
Islamic Affairs and Endowment	Abdul Jamil Zarifi	October 1986 – 16 June 1988
Minister without portfolio	Faqir Mohammad Yaqubi	7 April 1983 – 16 June 1988
Minister without portfolio Minister of State	Nematullah Pazhwak	January 1987 – 16 June 1988
Central Bank	not a ministerial post until 1 April 1982	
Central Bank	Mehrabuddin Paktiawal	1 April 1982 – after 8 January 1987
Central Bank	Abdul Basir Ranjbar	before 7 July 1987 – 16 June 1988
Minister of State for Economic Affairs	did not exist until 26 December 1985	
Minister of State for Economic Affairs	Fazal Haq Khaliqyar	26 December 1985 – 16 June 1988
Minister of State for Islamic Affairs	did not exist until 26 December 1985	
Minister of State for Islamic Affairs	Abdul Ghafur Baher	26 December 1985 – 16 June 1988
Minister of State for Social and Cultural Affairs	did not exist until 26 December 1985	
Minister of State for Social and Cultural Affairs	Abdul Wahid Sorabi	26 December 1985 – before 4 January 1988
Minister of State for Social and Cultural Affairs	vacant	before 4 January – 16 June 1988
Minister of State for Nationalities and Tribal Affairs	did not exist until 26 December 1985	
Minister of State for Nationalities and Tribal Affairs	Sarjang Khan Jaji	26 December 1985 – 16 June 1988
Minister of State for Foreign Affairs	did not exist until 4 December 1986	
Minister of State for Foreign Affairs	Shah Mohammad Dost	4 December 1986 – 16 June 1988
Minister of State for Direct Cooperation	did not exist until before 4 January 1988	
Minister of State for Direct Cooperation	Sayed Akran Paiger	before 4 January – 16 June 1988

=== Sharq Council of Ministers (1988–1989) ===
Sharq Council of Ministers
Portfolio	Name	Year(s)
Role
Chairman	Mohammad Hasan Sharq	16 June 1988 – 20 February 1989
Chairman	vacant	20 – 21 February 1989
Deputy Chairman	Sayed Amanuddin Amin	before 1 July 1988 – 21 February 1989
Deputy Chairman	Mahbubullah Koshani	before 1 July 1988 – 21 February 1989
Deputy Chairman	Sarwar Mangal	before 1 July 1988 – 21 February 1989
Key ministries
Foreign Affairs	Abdul Wakil	16 June 1988 – 21 February 1989
Defense	vacant	16 June – 17 August 1988
Defense	Shahnawaz Tanai	17 August 1988 – 21 February 1989
Interior	Sayed Mohammad Gulabzoy	16 June – 8 November 1988
Interior	vacant	8 – 16 November 1988
Interior	Mohammad Aslam Watanjar	16 November 1988 – 21 February 1989
Justice	Muhammad Bashir Baghlani	16 June 1988 – 21 February 1989
State Security	Ghulam Faruq Yaqubi	16 June 1988 – 21 February 1989
Finance	Hamidullah Tarzi	16 June 1988 – 21 February 1989
other ministries
Commerce	Mohammad Khan Jalalar	16 June 1988 – 18 February 1989
Commerce	Burhanuddin Ghiasi	18 – 21 February 1989
Light Industries and Foodstuffs	Dost Mohammad Fazl	16 June 1988 – 18 February 1989
Light Industries and Foodstuffs	Abdul Bahar	18 – 21 February 1989
Education and Training	Ghulam Rasul Rasuli	16 June 1988 – 21 February 1989
Higher and Vocational Education	Nur Ahmad Barits	16 June 1988 – 18 February 1989
Higher and Vocational Education	Khudadad Ismail Danesh	18 – 21 February 1989
Construction Affairs	Nazar Mohammad	16 June 1988 – 21 February 1989
Public Health	Abdul Fatah Najm	16 June 1988 – 18 February 1989
Public Health	Sayyed Amin Zara	18 – 21 February 1989
Communications	Mohammad Aslam Watanjar	16 June – 16 November 1988
Communications	vacant	16 November – 19 December 1988
Communications	Mir Azmuddin	19 December 1988 – 21 February 1989
Mines and Industries	Mohammad Ishaq Kawa	16 June 1988 – 21 February 1989
Agriculture and Land Reforms	Mohammad Ghofran	16 June 1988 – 21 February 1989
Water and Power	Raz Mohammad Paktin	16 June 1988 – 21 February 1989
Information and Culture	was re-established on 5 July 1988	
Information and Culture	vacant	5 – 9 July 1988
Information and Culture	Ahmad Bashir Ruigar	9 July 1988 – 21 February 1989
Revival and Rural Development	Asif Zahir	16 June 1988 – 21 February 1989
Tribal Affairs/Border Affairs	Sulaiman Layeq	16 June 1988 – 21 February 1989
Returnees Affairs	Abdul Ghafar Farahi	16 June 1988 – 18 February 1989
Returnees Affairs	Sayed Akram Paigir	18 – 21 February 1989
Planning Affairs	Sultan Hussain	16 June 1988 – 21 February 1989
Transport	Mohammad Aziz	16 June – 19 December 1988
Transport	Khalilullah	19 December 1988 – 21 February 1989
Civil Aviation	Pacha Gul Wafadar	16 June 1988 – 18 February 1989
Civil Aviation	Sherjan Mazdooryar	18 – 21 February 1989
Islamic Affairs and Endowment	vacant	16 June 1988 – 18 February 1989
Islamic Affairs and Endowment	Abdul Ghafur Baher	18 – 21 February 1989
Central Bank	Abdul Basir Ranjbar	16 June 1988 – before 1 January 1989
Central Bank	Mohammad Kabir	before 1 January – 21 February 1989
Minister without portfolio	Nur Ahmad Barits	18 – 21 February 1989
Minister without portfolio Minister of State	Faqir Mohammad Yaqubi	16 June 1988 – 21 February 1989
Minister without portfolio Minister of State	Nematullah Pazhwak	16 June 1988 – 21 February 1989
Minister without portfolio Minister of State	Fazal Haq Khaliqyar	16 June 1988 – 21 February 1989
Minister without portfolio Minister of State	Sarjang Khan Jaji	16 June 1988 – 21 February 1989
Minister without portfolio Minister of State	Shah Mohammad Dost	16 June 1988 – 21 February 1989

=== Second Keshtmand Executive Committee of the Council of Ministers (1989–1990) ===
Keshtmand Executive Committee of the Council of Ministers
Portfolio	Name	Year(s)	Affiliation	Ethnicity
Role
Chairman	Sultan Ali Keshtmand	21 February 1989 – 7 May 1990		
Chairman	Fazal Haq Khaliqyar	7 – 21 May 1990		
First Deputy Chairman	was re-established on 24 June 1989			
First Deputy Chairman	Mahmood Baryalai	24 June 1989 – 21 May 1990		
Deputy Chairman	Sayed Amanuddin Amin	21 February 1989 – 21 May 1990		
Deputy Chairman	Mahbubullah Koshani	21 February 1989 – 21 May 1990	Settam-e-Melli	Tajik
Deputy Chairman	Sarwar Mangal	21 February 1989 – 21 May 1990		
Deputy Chairman	Mohammad Hakim	before 3 November 1989 – 21 May 1990		
Key ministries
Foreign Affairs	Abdul Wakil	21 February 1989 – 21 May 1990		
Defense	Shahnawaz Tanai	21 February 1989 – 6 March 1990		
Defense	Mohammad Aslam Watanjar	6 March – 21 May 1990		
Interior	Mohammad Aslam Watanjar	21 February 1989 – 6 March 1990		
Interior	Raz Mohammad Paktin	6 March – 21 May 1990		
State Security	Ghulam Faruq Yaqubi	21 February 1989 – 21 May 1990		
Justice	Muhammad Bashir Baghlani	21 February 1989 – 21 May 1990	Settam-e-Melli	Tajik
Finance	Hamidullah Tarzi	21 February 1989 – 21 May 1990		
other ministries
Commerce	Burhanuddin Ghiasi	21 February 1989 – 21 May 1990		
Light Industries and Foodstuffs	Abdul Bahar	21 February 1989 – 21 May 1990		
Education and Training	Ghulam Rasul Rasuli	21 February – before 3 November 1989		
Education and Training	Khodaidad Basharmal	before 3 November 1989 – 21 May 1990		
Higher and Vocational Education	Khudadad Ismail Danesh	21 February – before 3 November 1989		
Higher and Vocational Education	Mehr Mohammad Ejazi	before 3 November 1989 – 21 May 1990		
Construction Affairs	Nazar Mohammad	21 February 1989 – 21 May 1990		
Public Health	Sayyed Amin Zara	21 February 1989 – 21 May 1990		
Communications	Mir Azmuddin	21 February 1989 – 21 May 1990		
Mines and Industries	Mohammad Ishaq Kawa	21 February 1989 – 21 May 1990	Settam-e-Melli	Tajik
Agriculture and Land Reforms	Mohammad Ghofran	21 February 1989 – 21 May 1990		
Water and Power	Raz Mohammad Paktin	21 February 1989 – 6 March 1990		
Water and Power	vacant	6 March – 21 May 1990		
Information and Culture	Ahmad Bashir Ruigar	21 February 1989 – 21 May 1990		
Revival and Rural Development	Asif Zahir	21 February 1989 – 21 May 1990		
Border Affairs	Sulaiman Layeq	21 February 1989 – 21 May 1990		
Returnees Affairs	Sayed Akram Paigir	21 February 1989 – 21 May 1990		
Planning Affairs	Sultan Hussain	21 February 1989 – 21 May 1990		
Transport	Khalilullah	21 February 1989 – 21 May 1990		
Civil Aviation	Sherjan Mazdooryar	21 February 1989 – 21 May 1990		
Islamic Affairs and Endowment	Abdul Ghafur Baher	21 February 1989 – 21 May 1990		
Central Bank	Mohammad Kabir	21 February 1989 – 21 May 1990		
Minister without portfolio Minister of State	Nur Ahmad Barits	21 February 1989 – 21 May 1990		
Minister without portfolio Minister of State	Faqir Mohammad Yaqubi	21 February 1989 – 21 May 1990		
Minister without portfolio Minister of State	Nematullah Pazhwak	21 February 1989 – 21 May 1990		
Minister without portfolio Minister of State	Fazal Haq Khaliqyar	21 February 1989 – 7 May 1990		
Minister without portfolio Minister of State	Sarjang Khan Jaji	21 February 1989 – 21 May 1990		
Minister without portfolio Minister of State	Shah Mohammad Dost	21 February 1989 – before 3 November 1989		
Minister without portfolio Minister of State	Nur Ahmed Nur	before 3 November 1989 – 21 May 1990		
Minister without portfolio Minister of State	Akbar Shah Wali	before 3 November 1989 – 21 May 1990		

=== Khaliqyar Council of Ministers (1990–1992) ===
Khaliqyar Council of Ministers
Portfolio	Name	Year(s)	Affiliation	Origin
Role
Chairman	Fazal Haq Khaliqyar	21 May 1990 – 16 April 1992		
First Deputy Chairman	Mahmood Baryalai	21 May 1990 – after 7 January 1991		
First Deputy Chairman	vacant	before 8 July 1991 – 16 April 1992		
Deputy Chairman	Mahbubullah Koshani	21 May 1990 – 16 April 1992	Settam-e-Melli	Tajik
Deputy Chairman	Nematullah Pazhwak	21 May 1990 – 16 April 1992		
Deputy Chairman	Abdul Qayyum Nurzai	21 May 1990 – 16 April 1992		
Deputy Chairman	Sarwar Mangal	21 May – after 7 September 1990		
Deputy Chairman	Abdul Wahid Sorabi	21 May – after 7 September 1990		
Deputy Chairman	Mohammad Anwar Arghandiwal	before 8 July 1991 – 16 April 1992		
Deputy Chairman	Abdul Samad Salim	before 8 July 1991 – 16 April 1992		
Key ministries
Foreign Affairs	Abdul Wakil	21 May 1990 – 16 April 1992		
Defense	Mohammad Aslam Watanjar	21 May 1990 – 16 April 1992		
Interior	Raz Mohammad Paktin	21 May 1990 – 16 April 1992		
State Security	Ghulam Faruq Yaqubi	21 May 1990 – 16 April 1992		
Justice	Ghulam Mohaiuddin Darez	21 May 1990 – 16 April 1992		
Finance	Mohammad Hakim	21 May 1990 – 16 April 1992		
other ministries
Commerce	Zakim Shah	21 May 1990 – 16 April 1992		
Light Industries and Foodstuffs	Mohammad Anwar Dost	21 May 1990 – 16 April 1992		
Education and Training	Masuma Esmati-Wardak	21 May 1990 – 16 April 1992		
Higher and Vocational Education	Mohammad Anwar Shams	21 May 1990 – 16 April 1992		
Construction Affairs	Faqir Mohammad Nekzad	21 May 1990 – 16 April 1992		
Public Health	Mehr Mohammad Ejazi	21 May 1990 – 16 April 1992		
Communications	Sayed Nasim Alawi	21 May 1990 – 16 April 1992		
Mines and Industries	Abdul Samad Saleh	21 May 1990 – 16 April 1992		
Agriculture and Land Reforms	Mohammad Ghofran	21 May 1990 – 16 April 1992		
Water and Power	Abdul Ghafur Rahim	21 May 1990 – 16 April 1992		
Information and Culture	Ahmad Bashir Ruigar	21 May 1990 – 16 April 1992		
Revival and Rural Development	Hayatullah Azizi	21 May 1990 – 16 April 1992		
Border Affairs	Sarjang Khan Jaji	21 May 1990 – 16 April 1992		
Returnees Affairs	Fateh Muhammad Tarin	21 May 1990 – 16 April 1992		
Planning Affairs	Abdul Wahid Sorabi	21 May – after 7 September 1990		
Planning Affairs	vacant	before 7 January – 7 February 1991		
Planning Affairs	Ghulam Mahiyuddin Shahbaz	7 February 1991 – 16 April 1992		
Transport	Khalilullah	21 May 1990 – 16 April 1992		
Civil Aviation	Hamidullah Tarzi	21 May 1990 – 7 February 1991		
Civil Aviation	Wadir Safi	7 February 1991 – 16 April 1992		
Islamic Affairs and Endowment	Muhammad Siddiq Sailani	21 May 1990 – 16 April 1992		
Central Statistics	Ghulam Mahiyuddin Shahbaz	21 May 1990 – 7 February 1991		
Central Statistics	Nazir Ahmad Shahidi	7 February 1991 – 16 April 1992		
Social Security	Saleha Farooq Etemadi	21 May 1990 – 16 April 1992		
Central Bank	Mohammad Kabir	21 May – after 7 September 1990		
Central Bank	Abdul Wahab Asefi	before 7 January – before 8 July 1991		
Central Bank	Khalilullah Sediq	before 8 July 1991 – 16 April 1992		
Minister without portfolio	Hamidullah Tarzi	before 6 March – 16 April 1992		
Minister without portfolio Minister of State	Nur Ahmad Barits	21 May 1990 – 16 April 1992		
Minister without portfolio Minister of State	Faqir Mohammad Yaqubi	21 May 1990 – 16 April 1992		
Minister without portfolio Minister of State	Sayed Akram Paigir	21 May 1990 – 16 April 1992		
Minister without portfolio Minister of State	Akbar Shah Wali	21 May 1990 – 16 April 1992		

=== Post-Najibullah interim government (1992) ===
Beginning on 18 March 1992 when President Mohammed Najibullah announced that he would resign as soon as a transitional authority was formed and especially since 10 April when a UN-backed plan of a pre-transition council composed of impartial personalities was presented, the government of the Republic of Afghanistan began to deteriorate quickly as government members were beginning to defect to the different mujahedin parties, offering assistance to each of the parties entering Kabul. The dynamics of these defections were heavily influenced by ethnic identity. Most Pashtun officials and police officers in the Ministry of Interior Affairs around Mohammad Aslam Watanjar, the Ministry of Foreign Affairs around Raz Mohammad Paktin and other members from the Khalq faction sought to build alliances with Gulbuddin Hekmatyar, commander of the Hizb-e Islami, while Tajik officers in the military and government, being mostly Parchamites, were defecting to Ahmad Shah Massoud, commander of the Jamiat-e Islami, and Turkmen and Uzbek officials were siding with Abdul Rashid Dostum, formerly aligned with the government but recently defected himself forming the Junbish-i Milli. On 16 April, Najibullah resigned after coming under pressure from an alliance of rebel leaders and dissident army officers. He tried to flee the country, but was intercepted by the dissident army unit of Dostum at the Kabul International Airport, and his whereabouts remained unclear.

Between 16 and 28 April 1992, though still officially in charge of the executive, the Khaliqyar Council of Ministers de facto did not exist anymore. In the wake of his resignation, Najibullah handed over power to a council composed of senior members of the executive committee of his ruling Watan Party, namely the four vice presidents Abdul Rahim Hatif (as acting president), Abdul Hamid Mohtat, Mohammed Rafie and Abdul Wahid Sorabi. But amid reports of escalating fighting and troop defections in and around Kabul, the new council's control of the capital appeared tenuous and divided. According to some sources, the actual power in the government was held by four Tajik ex-PDPA generals allied with Massoud who were backed by army leaders in the capital and northern Afghanistan. Among those four were Deputy Defense Minister Mohammad Nabi Azimi, the commander of the Kabul Garrison Baba Jan Zahid and Chief of Staff of the army Muhammad Asif Delawar. Foreign Minister Abdul Wakil, himself being a dissident, stated that the insurgents were open to transferring power to a UN-sponsored interim government if one could be established. The United Nations Security Council held an emergency session to address the Afghan crisis, and UN envoy Benon Sevan extended his stay in Kabul for further discussions. Additionally, Wakil reported that Ghulam Faruq Yaqubi, the head of the KHAD, had committed suicide and was replaced by Osman Sultani.

On 24 April, the Peshawar Accords were signed, and different mujahideen groups took over control: while the Ministry of Interior Affairs and the Arg were occupied by Hekmatyar's forces, most of the other government ministries were conquered by Massoud's and Dostum's forces. By 25 April, the city center of Kabul, which was the last part of the city still in the hands of the government, fell into the hands of the different mujahideen rebel groups.

At a press conference in Peshawar, the leaders of six rebel parties named a 50-member interim council, composed of five representatives from each of the ten major rebel groups. The council was to be under the leadership of the Afghan National Liberation Front leader and former Afghan Interim Government president Sibghatullah Mojaddedi and was to move to Kabul within two days to rule for two months. After two months of rule by Mojaddedi, Jamiat-e Islami leader Burhanuddin Rabbani was to take over as president of the transitional government for four months before a permanent government was to replace it. In Rabbani's government, according to some reports, Hekmatyar was to be prime minister, Massoud defense minister, Ittehad-e-Islami leader Abdulrab Rasul Sayyaf interior minister and Mahaz-e-Melli leader Seyyed Ahmad Gailani foreign minister. The transitional government was to remain in power for four months after which a grand assembly of tribal elders would arrange and schedule national elections. Hekmatyar immediately expressed his opposition to the plan.

On 27 April 1992, Hekmatyar and his allies were forced out of the ministries and institutions that they occupied by the Northern Alliance forces, an on 28 April, the Islamic State of Afghanistan was officially declared, ending communist rule over Afghanistan exactly 14 years after the Saur Revolution. On this day, members of the old government, including the former prime minister Fazal Haq Khaliqyar, the leaders of the old Senate and House of Representatives, and the chief justice of the Supreme Court Abdul Karim Shahdan, handed power to Mojaddedi in a formal ceremony at the Ministry of Foreign Affairs.

== Islamic State (1992–1996) ==
=== Afghan Mujahideen Transitional Council (1992) ===
On 5 May 1992, at least 36 Mujahideen leaders were named as members of the transitional administration; among those were the Interim Council president Sibghatullah Mojaddedi, President-designate Burhanuddin Rabbani, Prime Minister nominee Abdul Sabur Farid Kohistani, three Deputy Prime Minister designates, 28 ministers, the Chief Justice of the Supreme Court Maulawi Abdullah, Attorney General Mohammad Qasim, the President of the Central Bank and Minister advisor Maulawi Mohammad Mir. Many government officials in less important positions are not known by name.

Afghan Mujahideen Council
Portfolio	Name	Year(s)	Affiliation	Origin
Role
President	Sibghatullah Mojaddedi	28 April – 28 June 1992		
Prime Minister	vacant	28 April – 28 June 1992		
Key ministries
Foreign Affairs	vacant	28 April – 5 May 1992		
Foreign Affairs	Sayed Sulaiman Gailani	5 May – 28 June 1992		
Defense	Ahmad Shah Massoud	28 April – 28 June 1992		
Home Affairs	vacant	28 April – 5 May 1992		
Home Affairs	Ahmad Shah Ahmadzai	5 May – 28 June 1992		
National Security	vacant	28 April – 5 May 1992		
National Security	Mohammad Yahya Nawroz	5 May – 28 June 1992		
Justice	vacant	28 April – 5 May 1992		
Justice	Jalaluddin Haqqani	5 May – 28 June 1992		
Finance	vacant	28 April – 5 May 1992		
Finance	Hamidullah Rahimi	5 May – 28 June 1992		
other ministries
Commerce	vacant	28 April – 5 May 1992		
Commerce	Wakil Shahbaz	5 May – 28 June 1992		
Light Industries and Foodstuffs	vacant	28 April – 5 May 1992		
Light Industries and Foodstuffs	Sulaiman Yari	5 May – 28 June 1992		
Education and Training	vacant	28 April – 5 May 1992		
Education and Training	unknown	5 May – 28 June 1992		
Higher and Vocational Education	vacant	28 April – 5 May 1992		
Higher and Vocational Education	Mohammad Musa Tawana	5 May – 28 June 1992		
Construction Affairs	vacant	28 April – 5 May 1992		
Construction Affairs	Mohammad Yaser	5 May – 28 June 1992		
Public Health	vacant	28 April – 5 May 1992		
Public Health	Najibullah Mojaddedi	5 May – 28 June 1992		
Communications	vacant	28 April – 5 May 1992		
Communications	Mohammad Akram	5 May – 28 June 1992		
Mines and Industries	vacant	28 April – 5 May 1992		
Mines and Industries	unknown	5 May – 28 June 1992		
Agriculture and Land Reforms	vacant	28 April – 5 May 1992		
Agriculture and Land Reforms	unknown	5 May – 28 June 1992		
Water and Power	vacant	28 April – 5 May 1992		
Water and Power	Faruq Azam	5 May – 28 June 1992		
Information and Culture	vacant	28 April – 5 May 1992		
Information and Culture	Wala Jan Waseq (Deputy)	5 May – 28 June 1992		
Revival and Rural Development	vacant	28 April – 5 May 1992		
Revival and Rural Development	Zabihullah Hadi	5 May – 28 June 1992		
City Construction	vacant	28 April – 5 May 1992		
City Construction	Abdul Hafez Beg	5 May – 28 June 1992		
Border Affairs	vacant	28 April – 5 May 1992		
Border Affairs	Abdul Ahad Karzai	5 May – 28 June 1992		
Returnees Affairs	vacant	28 April – 5 May 1992		
Returnees Affairs	Rahmatullah Wahidyar	5 May – 28 June 1992		
Planning Affairs	vacant	28 April – 5 May 1992		
Planning Affairs	unknown	5 May – 28 June 1992		
Transport	vacant	28 April – 5 May 1992		
Transport	unknown	5 May – 28 June 1992		
Civil Aviation	vacant	28 April – 5 May 1992		
Civil Aviation	unknown	5 May – 28 June 1992		
Islamic Affairs and Endowment	vacant	28 April – 5 May 1992		
Islamic Affairs and Endowment	Arsala Rahmani	5 May – 28 June 1992		
Central Statistics	vacant	28 April – 5 May 1992		
Central Statistics	unknown	5 May – 28 June 1992		
Labor and Social Security	vacant	28 April – 5 May 1992		
Labor and Social Security	Abdul Manan Abed	5 May – 28 June 1992		
Observation of Martyrs and Disabled	vacant	28 April – 5 May 1992		
Observation of Martyrs and Disabled	Anwar	5 May – 28 June 1992		
Central Bank	vacant	28 April – 5 May 1992		
Central Bank	unknown	5 May – 28 June 1992		

=== Afghan Interim Leadership Council (1992–1993) ===
The Leadership Council took over power on 28 July 1992 and according to the Peshawar Accord, the mandate for the interim government was intended to expire after four months on 28 October. For an orderly transition, according to the Afghan News Agency, President Burhanuddin Rabbani, Hezb-e Islami leader Gulbuddin Hekmatyar, Ittehad-i Islami leader Abdulrab Rasul Sayyaf and Harakat-i Inqilab-e Islami leader Mohammad Nabi Mohammadi agreed to call a shura before that date to elect a new government. However, on 24 October, the Leadership Council ratified the generalities of a resolution bill to establish a Resolution and Settlement Council of 1,335 members from all provinces and powerful groups to elect a president for a term of 18 months, and on 27 October, the Leadership Council elected to extend Rabbani's term by one and a half months until 15 December 1992. But when a first meeting of this Resolution and Settlement Council failed to convene on 12 December, Rabbani announced that he would stay interim president until a successor was chosen. On 30 December, the Council once again met in the Ministry of Foreign Affairs to appoint an interim president, but most mujahideen groups boycotted the meeting because of bribery allegations. At the end, even though 360 council members chose not to participate, the council voted to keep Rabbani in power who was sworn in as president for 18 month on 3 January 1993. Until he named a new cabinet, members of the Interim Leadership Council stood in their roles as caretaker ministers.

On 7 March 1993, after six days of negotiations, Rabbani and Hekmatyar and other major Mujahideen representatives signed the Islamabad Accord, agreeing on a ceasefire. The agreement designated the Organization of the Islamic Conference and Mujahideen representatives as monitors of the ceasefire and, among other points, designated Hekmatyar to be the prime minister and Rabbani to continue as president. They also were to jointly appoint the cabinet, but because of differences between the parties on the nomination of Ahmad Shah Massoud as defense minister, the appointment was decided to be done on 22 March 1993. This was first postponed until 29 March and then again until 2 April 1993 when a list of candidates for the ministries was presented to Rabbani. It was not announced who Hekmatyar proposed as candidates. Rabbani refused to accept the list and told that it was ″subject to change″. Even though Hekmatyar then unilaterally tried to dissolve the cabinet, the former cabinet remained in place as most government ministers reported to work as usual. On 15 April, Hekmatyar presented a second list which, unlike the first one, included Massoud, but as Foreign Minister instead of Defense Minister. Rabbani rejected Hekmatyar's proposal for the second time. On 30 April, Rabbani, Hekmatyar and other mujahideen leaders met up in Jalalabad to once again discuss the formation of a cabinet, but without reaching a result. In a second meeting on 17 May, government and Mujahideen representatives agreed to a plan giving Rabbani control of the Defense Ministry while Hekmatyar would control the Interior Ministry for two months. On 20 May it was deciced that two members from each of the Mujahideen parties were assigned to a cabinet position and that Massoud would resign as defense minister. A new Defense and Interior Minister were to be appointed by a council led by Rabbani.

Afghan Leadership Council
Portfolio	Name	Year(s)	Affiliation	Origin
Role
President	Burhanuddin Rabbani	28 June 1992 – 17 June 1993		
Prime Minister	vacant	28 June – 6 July 1992		
Prime Minister	Abdul Sabur Farid Kohistani	6 July – 16 August 1992		
Prime Minister	vacant	16 August 1992 – 17 June 1993		
Deputy Prime Minister	Sayed Sulaiman Gailani	before 8 September 1992 – 17 June 1993		
Deputy Prime Minister	Ahmad Shah Ahmadzai	before 8 September 1992 – 17 June 1993		
Deputy Prime Minister	Din Mohammad	before 8 September 1992 – 17 June 1993		
Key ministries
Foreign Affairs	Sayed Sulaiman Gailani	28 June 1992 – 17 June 1993		
Defense	Ahmad Shah Massoud	28 June 1992 – 17 June 1993		
Interior	Ahmad Shah Ahmadzai	28 June 1992 – 17 June 1993		
National Security	Khodadad Khan	28 June – after 6 July 1992		
National Security	was dissolved before 8 September 1992			
Justice	Jalaluddin Haqqani	28 June – after 8 September 1992		
Justice	vacant	before 7 January – 17 June 1993		
Finance	Hamidullah Rahimi	28 June 1992 – 17 June 1993		
other ministries
Commerce	Wakil Shahbaz	28 June – 25 September 1992		
Commerce	Abdul Wahid Sorabi	25 September 1992 – 17 June 1993		
Light Industries and Foodstuffs	Sulaiman Yari	28 June 1992 – 17 June 1993		
Education and Training	Abdul Qayum	28 June – after 6 July 1992		
Education and Training	Din Mohammad	before 8 September 1992 – 17 June 1993		
Higher and Vocational Education	Mohammad Musa Tawana	28 June 1992 – 17 June 1993		
Construction Affairs	Mohammad Yaser	28 June – after 8 September 1992		
Construction Affairs	Abdul Rahim Karimi	before 7 January – 17 June 1993		
Public Health	Najibullah Mojaddedi	28 June – 2 August 1992		
Public Health	vacant	2 August – 25 September 1992		
Public Health	Mohammad Yaqub Barakzai	25 September 1992 – 17 June 1993		
Communications	Mohammad Akram	28 June 1992 – 17 June 1993		
Mines and Industries	Mohammad Yaqub Lali	28 June 1992 – 17 June 1993		
Agriculture and Land Reforms	unknown	28 June – after 6 July 1992		
Agriculture and Land Reforms	Mohammad Hadi Hadi	before 8 September 1992 – 17 June 1993		
Water and Power	Faruq Azam	28 June 1992 – 17 June 1993		
Information and Culture	Mohammad Siddiq Chakari	28 June 1992 – 17 June 1993		
Revival and Rural Development	Zabihullah Hadi	28 June – 25 September 1992		
Revival and Rural Development	Ishaq Gowhari	25 September 1992 – 17 June 1993		
City Construction	Abdul Hafez Beg	28 June 1992 – 17 June 1993		
Border Affairs	Abdul Ahad Karzai	28 June – after 8 September 1992		
Border Affairs	Naim Kuchi	before 7 January – 17 June 1993		
Returnees Affairs	Rahmatullah Wahidyar	28 June 1992 – 17 June 1993		
Planning	Sayed Mohammad Ali Jawid	28 June 1992 – 17 June 1993		
Development and Inspection	Abdul Wahid Sorabi	28 June – 25 September 1992		
Development and Inspection	was dissolved on 25 September 1992			
Transport	unknown	28 June – after 6 July 1992		
Transport	Mohammad Khalil Zuhad	before 8 September 1992 – 17 June 1993		
Civil Aviation	Abdul Rahman	28 June 1992 – 17 June 1993		
Islamic Affairs and Endowment	Arsala Rahmani	28 June 1992 – 17 June 1993		
Central Statistics	unknown	28 June 1992 – 17 June 1993		
Labor and Social Security	Abdul Manan Abed	28 June – 25 September 1992		
Labor and Social Security	Ahmad Nazar Balkhi	25 September 1992 – 17 June 1993		
Observation of Martyrs and Disabled	Anwar	28 June 1992 – 17 June 1993		
Central Bank	Mir Najibullah Sahu	28 June 1992 – 17 June 1993		
Minister without portfolio	Mohammad Nadir Khurram	before 7 January – 17 June 1993		
Minister of State	Taqaddosi	28 June 1992 – 17 June 1993		
Minister of State for Foreign Affairs	Mohammad Sadiq Saljuqi	28 June – after 6 July 1992		
Minister of State for Foreign Affairs	Najibullah Lafraie	before 8 September 1992 – 17 June 1993		
Minister of State for Government Affairs	Abdul Hai Elahi	28 June 1992 – 17 June 1993		

=== First Hekmatyar cabinet and power struggles (1993–1996) ===
On 17 June 1993, Prime Minister Gulbuddin Hekmatyar and his cabinet were sworn in by President Burhanuddin Rabbani. On 8 September, Hekmatyar called on Rabbani and the cabinet to resign to allow for the establishment of a "neutral interim government" to be chosen in a free general election, but was denied. On 11 December, Rabbani allegedly approved the resignation of Hekmatyar and the transfer of power to Communications Minister Mohammad Amin Waqad, however, the Hezb-e Islami denied that he had stepped down as prime minister. On 19 December, Radio Afghanistan announced that Qutbuddin Hilal had assumed the duties of prime minister, which again was denied by Hekmatyar.

Since 1 January 1994 when Rabbani's and Hekmatyar's forces openly went to war against each other, the real power that the cabinet had at that point was heavily put under question because the ministers loyal to each side where only commanding to the president or prime minister respectively.

Rabbani refused to step down at the end of his term on 28 June 1994 and then again half a year later on 28 December 1994, and on 1 January 1995, United Nations peace envoy Mahmoud Mestiri returned to Kabul. On 10 January 1995, Rabbani offered to step down and turn over power to a 23-member UN interim administration if Hekmatyar agreed to withdraw. On 12 February, the many parties agreed to a multi-party council which would take over on 20 February. On that date though, the scheduled transfer of power was disrupted by demands from Rabbani for assurances that the new government includes the newly emerging Taliban. Hence, Rabbani further delayed his resignation stating he would not resign before 21 March. On 18 March however, Rabbani announces that hewould not step down on the UN-appointed date because the "mechanism for the transfer of power had not been established", and that the transfer of power to an interim government was delayed for another 15 days, which also did not happen. At that point, Hekmatyar already had to abandon his headquarters in Chahar Asyab due to the overwhelming force of the Taliban, further diminishing or de facto (but until November 1995 not de jure) ending his power as prime minister. On 14 November 1995, Mistiri reported that Rabbani had agreed to step down and to transfer power to a 25-member transitional council, but the Taliban rejected that proposal.

On 20 May 1996, President Burhanuddin Rabbani met with ex-Prime Minister Gulbuddin Hekmatyar to discuss an alliance between Hekmatyar's Hezb-e Islami and the Rabbani's government, and on 24 May they agreed to end hostilities between their two groups to move toward an elected government. On 26 June 1996, Hekmatyar was sworn in as prime minister for a second time, keeping the ministers of the old government as acting ministers until a new cabinet was elected.

Hekmatyar Cabinet
Portfolio	Name	Year(s)	Affiliation	Origin
Role
President	Burhanuddin Rabbani	17 June 1993 – 3 July 1996		
Prime Minister	Gulbuddin Hekmatyar	17 June 1993 – 28 June 1994		
Prime Minister	disputed (de facto)	28 June 1994 – before 14 February 1995		
Prime Minister	Arsala Rahmani (caretaker; de facto)	before 14 February – before 16 November 1995		
Prime Minister	Ahmad Shah Ahmadzai (acting; de facto)	before 16 November 1995 – 26 June 1996		
Prime Minister	Gulbuddin Hekmatyar	26 June – 3 July 1996		
First Deputy Prime Minister	Qutbuddin Hilal	before 10 September 1993 – before 26 June 1996		
Deputy Prime Minister	Arsala Rahmani	before 10 September 1993 – before 26 June 1996		
Key ministries
Foreign Affairs	Hedayat Amin Arsala	17 June 1993 – after 1 November 1995		
Foreign Affairs	Najibullah Lafraie (caretaker)	before 2 January – before 26 June 1996		
Foreign Affairs	vacant	before 26 June – 3 July 1996		
Defense	Ahmad Shah Massoud (de facto)	17 June 1993 – 3 July 1996		
Interior	vacant	17 June 1993 – 26 June 1996		
Interior	Munshi Abdul Majid (acting)	26 June – 3 July 1996		
Justice	Jalaluddin Haqqani	17 June 1993 – before 28 June 1996		
Justice	vacant	before 28 June – 3 July 1996		
Finance	Karim Khalili	17 June 1993 – before 26 June 1996		
Finance	Karimi	before 26 June – 3 July 1996		
other ministries
Commerce	Hayatullah Belaghi	17 June 1993 – before 26 June 1996		
Commerce	Alami Balkhi	before 26 June – 3 July 1996		
Education	Jalluddin Zada	17 June 1993 – before 26 June 1996		
Education	Mohammad Fazel	before 26 June – 3 July 1996		
Higher Education	Syed Omar Monib	17 June 1993 – 3 July 1996		
Reconstruction	Faiz Mohammad	17 June 1993 – before 28 June 1996		
Reconstruction	vacant	before 28 June – 3 July 1996		
Public Health	Mohammad Amin Fatimi	17 June 1993 – before 20 May 1996		
Public Health	Mohammad Yusuf Barakzai	before 20 May – 3 July 1996		
Communications	Mohammad Amin Waqad	17 June 1993 – 3 July 1996		
Agriculture	Sayed Nurullah Emad	17 June 1993 – 3 July 1996		
Water and Power	Mohammad Ayub	17 June 1993 – 3 July 1996		
Information	Din Mohammad	17 June 1993 – 26 June 1996		
Information	Sayed Ishaq Diljo Hussaini (acting)	26 June – 3 July 1996		
City Planning	Ahmad Shah Ahmadzai	17 June 1993 – 3 July 1996		
Frontiers	Sayed Sulaiman Gailani	17 June 1993 – 3 July 1996		
Tribal Affairs	was established after 1 September 1994			
Tribal Affairs	Mohammad Siddiq Chakari (acting)	before 2 December 1994 – 3 July 1996		
Refugees	Faruq Azam	17 June 1993 – before 26 June 1996		
Refugees	vacant	before 26 June – 3 July 1996		
Planning	Sayed Mohammad Ali Jawid	17 June 1993 – 3 July 1996		
Transportation	unknown	17 June – after 11 August 1993		
Transportation	Mohammad Khalil Zuhad	before 10 September 1993 – before 26 June 1996		
Transportation	Abdul Ghafar Sayem	before 26 June – 3 July 1996		
Civil Aviation	Hashmatullah Mojaddedi	17 June 1993 – after 31 January 1994		
Civil Aviation	Abdul Rahman	before 1 April 1994 – 3 July 1996		
Haj and Auqaf	Arsala Rahmani	17 June 1993 – before 26 June 1996		
Haj and Auqaf	vacant	before 26 June – 3 July 1996		
Labor and Social Affairs	Sayed Hussein Anwari	17 June 1993 – 3 July 1996		
Central Bank	Ghulam Mohammad Yelaqi	17 June – after 11 August 1993	pro-Hezb-e Wahdat; pro-Mohaqiq	Hazara (Balkh)
Central Bank	Zabihullah Eltizam	before 10 September 1993 – after 1 September 1994		
Central Bank	Mohammad Hakim	before 2 December 1994 – 3 July 1996		
Minister without portfolio Minister of State for State Affairs	Abdul Hai Elahi	before 5 January 1994 – 3 July 1996		
Minister of State for Financial Affairs	Hamidullah Tarzi	before 10 September 1993 – 3 July 1996		
Minister of State for Foreign Affairs	Najibullah Lafraie	before 10 September 1993 – 3 July 1996		

=== Second Hekmatyar cabinet (1996) ===
On 26 September 1996, it was reported that the Taliban have captured Kabul, although this was denied by Deputy Foreign Minister Abdul Rahim Ghafoorzai. The next day, the government fled north of Kabul to Charikar and Jabal Saraj at the gateway to the Panjshir Valley, considering the inevitable conquer of the city by the guerilla forces. The Rabbani government tried to reconquer the capital for a year, but where weakened and lost even more land, so that on 21 August 1997, when Hekmatyar already fled to Iran and his successor Ghafoorzai died, the cabinet, which already de facto lost control over the country, was dissolved.

Hekmatyar Cabinet
Portfolio	Name	Year(s)	Affiliation	Origin
Role
Prime Minister	Gulbuddin Hekmatyar	3 July – 27 September 1996		
First Deputy Prime Minister	Qutbuddin Hilal	20 July – 27 September 1996		
Key ministries
Foreign Affairs	Abdul Rahim Ghafoorzai (caretaker)	3 July – 27 September 1996		
Defense	Waheedullah Sabawoon	3 July – 27 September 1996		
Interior	Yunus Qanuni	3 July – 27 September 1996		
Justice	vacant	3 July – 27 September 1996		
Finance	Abdul Hadi Arghandiwal	3 July – 27 September 1996		
other ministries
Commerce	Alami Balkhi	3 July – 27 September 1996		
Education	Ahmad Shah Ahmadzai	3 July – 27 September 1996		
Higher Education	vacant	3 July – 27 September 1996		
Reconstruction	vacant	3 July – 27 September 1996		
Public Health	vacant	3 July – 27 September 1996		
Communications	vacant	3 July – 27 September 1996		
Agriculture	vacant	3 – 20 July 1996		
Agriculture	Sikander Qiam	20 July – 27 September 1996		
Water and Power	vacant	3 July – 27 September 1996		
Information and Culture	Sayed Ishaq Diljo Hussaini (acting)	3 July – after 3 September 1996		
Information and Culture	Ghyasuddin Kashat	after 3 – 27 September 1996		
House and City Construction	vacant	3 – 20 July 1996		
House and City Construction	Abdul Salam Hashemi	20 July – 27 September 1996		
Frontiers	vacant	3 July – 27 September 1996		
Tribal Affairs	vacant	3 July – 27 September 1996		
Refugees	vacant	3 July – 27 September 1996		
Planning	Sayed Mohammad Ali Jawid	3 July – 27 September 1996		
Transportation	vacant	3 July – 27 September 1996		
Civil Aviation	vacant	3 July – 27 September 1996		
Haj and Auqaf	vacant	3 July – 27 September 1996		
Labor and Social Affairs	Sayed Hussein Anwari	3 July – 27 September 1996		
Martyrs and Disabled	Samiullah Najibi	3 July – 27 September 1996		
Central Bank	Mohammad Hakim	3 July – 27 September 1996		
Minister Counselor for Cultural and Social Affairs	Abdul Hai Elahi	3 July – 27 September 1996		
Minister Counselor for Economic Affairs	Hamidullah Tarzi	3 July – 27 September 1996		
Minister of State for Foreign Affairs	Najibullah Lafraie	3 July – 27 September 1996		

== Islamic Emirate (1996–2001) ==
=== Rabbani Provisional Council of Ministers (1996–2001) ===
On 27 September 1996, the Taliban captured Kabul, forcing the old government to flee from the city. They also set up a six-member provisional council, among them Information and Culture Minister Amir Khan Muttaqi, Foreign Minister Mohammad Ghaus Akhund, Deputy Foreign Minister Sher Mohammad Abbas Stanikzai, Health Minister Massoumi Afghan and others, to govern the capital and named Mohammad Rabbani, who is not related to Islamic State's president Burhanuddin Rabbani, to lead the Council of Ministers. The Taliban declared the Islamic Emirate of Afghanistan, which was only recognized by Pakistan, Saudi Arabia and the United Arab Emirates, though Pakistan and the United Emirates later withdrew their recognition after the September 11 attacks. All other states continued to recognize the Islamic State of Afghanistan.

Rabbani Provisional Council of Ministers
Portfolio	Name	Year(s)	Affiliation	Origin
Role
Prime Minister	Mohammad Rabbani	27 September 1996 – 16 April 2001	Taliban	
Prime Minister	Abdul Kabir (caretaker)	16 April – 13 November 2001	Taliban	
First Deputy Prime Minister	Hasan Akhund	before 25 January – 13 November 2001	Taliban	
Second Deputy Prime Minister	Abdul Kabir	before 25 January – 13 November 2001	Taliban	
Key ministries
Foreign Affairs	Mohammad Ghaus Akhund	27 September 1996 – 28 May 1997	Taliban	
Foreign Affairs	Sher Mohammad Abbas Stanikzai (acting)	28 May – after 24 September 1997	Taliban	
Foreign Affairs	Hasan Akhund	after 24 September 1997 – 27 October 1999	Taliban	
Foreign Affairs	Wakil Ahmed Muttawakil	27 October 1999 – 13 November 2001	Taliban	
Defense	Saadullah Popal (acting)	27 September 1996 – April 1997	Taliban	
Defense	Obaidullah Akhund	April 1997 – 13 November 2001	Taliban	
Interior	unknown	27 September 1996 – c. 1997	Taliban	
Interior	Khairullah Khairkhwa	c. 1997 – c. 1998	Taliban	
Interior	unknown	c. 1998 – before 25 January 2001	Taliban	
Interior	Abdur Razzaq Akhundzada	before 25 January – 13 November 2001	Taliban	
Security and Intelligence	unknown	27 September – c. 1996	Taliban	
Security and Intelligence	Ahmadullah	c. 1996 – 13 November 2001	Taliban	
Justice	unknown	27 September 1996 – before 25 January 2001	Taliban	
Justice	Nooruddin Turabi	before 25 January – 13 November 2001	Taliban	
Finance	unknown	27 September 1996 – c. 1999	Taliban	
Finance	Mohammad Ahmadi	c. 1999 – before 23 February 2001	Taliban	
Finance	Muhammad Taher Anwari	before – after c. 1999	Taliban	
Finance	Agha Jan Motasim	c. 1999 – 13 November 2001	Taliban	
other ministries
Commerce	unknown	27 September 1996 – 1999	Taliban	
Commerce	Abdul Razak	1999 – 13 November 2001	Taliban	
Education	unknown	27 September 1996 – unknown	Taliban	
Education	Sayed Ghiasuddin	unknown – February 1999	Taliban	
Education	Amir Khan Muttaqi	February 1999 – 13 November 2001	Taliban	
Higher Education	unknown	27 September 1996 – unknown	Taliban	
Higher Education	Hamdullah Nomani	unknown – before 25 January 2001	Taliban	
Higher Education	Din Mohammad Hanif	before 25 January – 13 November 2001	Taliban	
Public Works	unknown	27 September 1996 – before 25 January 2001	Taliban	
Public Works	Mohammadullah Mati	before 25 January – 13 November 2001	Taliban	
Construction	unknown	27 September 1996 – before 1999	Taliban	
Construction	Dadullah	before 1999 – 13 November 2001	Taliban	
Public Health	Massoumi Afghan	27 September 1996 – before 25 January 2001	Taliban	
Public Health	Mohammad Abbas Akhund	before 25 January – 13 November 2001	Taliban	
Communications	unknown	27 September 1996 – unknown	Taliban	
Communications	Mohammadullah Mati	unknown – before 25 January 2001	Taliban	
Communications	Yar Mohammad Rahimi	before 25 January – 13 November 2001	Taliban	
Mines and Industries	unknown	27 September 1996 – before c. 1999	Taliban	
Mines and Industries	Ahmad Jan	before c. 1999 – before 25 January 2001	Taliban	
Mines and Industries	Mohammad Essa Akhund	after 25 January – 13 November 2001	Taliban	
Agriculture	unknown	27 September 1996 – before 31 January 2001	Taliban	
Agriculture	Abdul Latif Mansur	before 31 January – 13 November 2001	Taliban	
Water and Electricity	unknown	27 September 1996 – before 25 January 2001	Taliban	
Water and Electricity	Mohammad Essa Akhund	before – after 25 January 2001	Taliban	
Water and Electricity	Ahmad Jan	before 25 January – 13 November 2001	Taliban	
Information and Culture	Amir Khan Muttaqi	27 September 1996 – before 25 January 2001	Taliban	
Information and Culture	Qudratullah Jamal	before 25 January – 13 November 2001	Taliban	
Urban Development	unknown	27 September 1996 – before 31 January 2001	Taliban	
Urban Development	Allah Dad Mati	before – after 31 January 2001	Taliban	
Frontier Affairs	unknown	27 September 1996 – before 31 January 2001	Taliban	
Frontier Affairs	Jalaluddin Haqqani	before 31 January – 13 November 2001	Taliban	
Martyrs and Repatriation	unknown	27 September 1996 – before 25 January 2001	Taliban	
Martyrs and Repatriation	Abdul Raqib Takhari	before 25 January – 13 November 2001	Taliban	
Planning	unknown	27 September 1996 – before 25 January 2001	Taliban	
Planning	Din Mohammad Hanif	before 25 January – 13 November 2001	Taliban	
Civil Aviation and Transportation	Akhtar Mohammad Mansour	27 September 1996 – 13 November 2001	Taliban	
Haj and Religious Affairs	unknown	27 September 1996 – before 31 January 2001	Taliban	
Haj and Religious Affairs	Sayed Ghiasuddin	before 31 January – 13 November 2001	Taliban	
Preventing Vice and Propagating Virtue	unknown	27 September 1996 – before 31 January 2001	Taliban	
Preventing Vice and Propagating Virtue	Mohammad Wali	before 31 January – 13 November 2001	Taliban	
Central Bank	unknown	27 September 1996 – unknown	Taliban	
Central Bank	Ehsanullah Sarfida	unknown – before 23 February 2001	Taliban	
Central Bank	Mohammad Ahmadi	before 23 February – 13 November 2001	Taliban	
Administrative Affairs	unknown	27 September 1996 – before 23 February 2001	Taliban	
Administrative Affairs	Muhammad Taher Anwari	before 23 February – 13 November 2001	Taliban	

== Transitional Islamic State (2001–2004) ==
=== Post-Taliban transitional phase (2001) ===
When Kabul fell to the Northern Alliance on 13 November 2001, former president Burhanuddin Rabbani returned to the Arg on 17 November. While the Taliban government still controlled Kandahar for several weeks, around two dozen prominent Afghans convened at the Bonn Conference to establish an interim administration and set a timeline for adopting a new constitution and holding democratic elections.

Concerns arose that Rabbani might attempt to retain power and marginalize Pashtun and Shia opposition groups, but he ultimately cooperated and supported the formation of a representative government. On 6 December 2001, it was decided that Pashtun leader Hamid Karzai would assume leadership. Until the official transition on 22 December, Rabbani remained de jure president of Afghanistan, as the United Nations had never recognized the Taliban's legitimacy. However, the de facto power rested with the Northern Alliance, which established a "Supreme Military Council" to administer the newly captured territories. The council, which ruled out a return of Rabbani, declared a three-month mandate. Council positions were held by close Massoud-allies: Mohammad Qasim Fahim as head of the council and defense minister, Yunus Qanuni as acting Interior Minister and Abdullah Abdullah as acting foreign minister.

Supreme Military Council
Portfolio	Name	Year(s)	Affiliation	Origin
Role
Head	Mohammad Qasim Fahim	13 November – 22 December 2001	Northern Alliance; pro-Jamiat-e Islami; pro-Massoud	Tajik (Panjshir)
Key ministries
Foreign Affairs	Abdullah Abdullah	13 November – 22 December 2001	Northern Alliance; pro-Jamiat-e Islami; pro-Massoud	Tajik (Panjshir)
Defense	Mohammad Qasim Fahim	13 November – 22 December 2001	Northern Alliance; pro-Jamiat-e Islami; pro-Massoud	Tajik (Panjshir)
Interior	Yunus Qanuni	13 November – 22 December 2001	Northern Alliance; Jamiat-e Islami; pro-Massoud	Tajik (Panjshir)

=== Karzai interim cabinet (2001–2002) ===
While the 30-member cabinet lineup was announced on 6 December, Karzai and his ministers were officially sworn in only on 22 December 2001.

Karzai interim cabinet
Portfolio	Name	Year(s)	Affiliation	Origin
Role
Chairman	Hamid Karzai	22 December 2001 – 24 June 2002	Rome group	Pashtun (Kandahar)
Vice Chairman	Mohammad Qasim Fahim	22 December 2001 – 24 June 2002	Northern Alliance; pro-Jamiat-e Islami; pro-Massoud	Tajik (Panjshir)
Vice Chairman	Hedayat Amin Arsala	22 December 2001 – 24 June 2002	Rome group; Mahaz-e Milli; Arsala clan	Pashtun (Kabul)
Vice Chairman	Mohammad Shakir Kargar	22 December 2001 – 24 June 2002	Northern Alliance; pro-Junbish-e Milli; pro-Dostum	Uzbek (Faryab)
Vice Chairman	Mohammad Mohaqiq	22 December 2001 – 24 June 2002	Northern Alliance; Hezb-e Wahdat	Hazara (Balkh)
Vice Chairwoman	Sima Samar	22 December 2001 – 24 June 2002	Rome group	Hazara (Ghazni)
Key ministries
Foreign Affairs	Abdullah Abdullah	22 December 2001 – 24 June 2002	Northern Alliance; pro-Jamiat-e Islami; pro-Massoud	Tajik (Panjshir)
Defense	Mohammad Qasim Fahim	22 December 2001 – 24 June 2002	Northern Alliance; pro-Jamiat-e Islami; pro-Massoud	Tajik (Panjshir)
Interior	Yunus Qanuni	22 December 2001 – 24 June 2002	Northern Alliance; Jamiat-e Islami; pro-Massoud	Tajik (Panjshir)
Justice	Abdul Rahim Karimi	22 December 2001 – 24 June 2002	Northern Alliance; pro-Jamiat-e Islami	Uzbek (Takhar)
Finance	Hedayat Amin Arsala	22 December 2001 – 24 June 2002	Rome group; Mahaz-e Milli; Arsala clan	Pashtun (Kabul)
other ministries
Commerce	Sayed Mustafa Kazemi	22 December 2001 – 24 June 2002	Northern Alliance; Hezb-e Wahdat	Shiite Sayyid (Parwan)
Education	Rasul Amin	22 December 2001 – 24 June 2002	Rome group; pro-Mahaz-e Milli	Pashtun (Kunar)
Higher Education	Sharif Fayez	22 December 2001 – 24 June 2002	Northern Alliance; pro-Ismail Khan	Tajik (Herat)
Public Works	Abdul Khaliq Fazal	22 December 2001 – 24 June 2002	Rome group	Pashtun
Reconstruction	Amin Farhang	22 December 2001 – 24 June 2002	Rome group	Tajik (Kabul)
Public Health	Sohaila Siddiqi	22 December 2001 – 24 June 2002	none	Pashtun (Kabul)
Communications	Abdul Rahim Sayed Jan	22 December 2001 – 24 June 2002	Northern Alliance; Jamiat-e Islami; pro-Rabbani	Tajik (Badakhshan)
Mines and Industries	Mohammed Alim Razm	22 December 2001 – 24 June 2002	Northern Alliance; pro-Junbish-e Milli	Uzbek
Small Industries	Mohammad Arif Noorzai	22 December 2001 – 24 June 2002	Northern Alliance; pro-Karzai; pro-Ittehad-e Islami	Pashtun (Kandahar)
Agriculture	Sayed Hussain Anwari	22 December 2001 – 24 June 2002	Northern Alliance; Harakat-e Islami	Shiite Sayyid (Parwan)
Water and Energy	Mohammad Shakir Kargar	22 December 2001 – 24 June 2002	Northern Alliance; pro-Junbish-e Milli; pro-Dostum	Uzbek (Faryab)
Irrigation	Mangal Hussain	22 December 2001 – 24 June 2002	Peshawar group; Hezb-e Islami	Pashtun
Information and Culture	Sayed Makhdoom Raheen	22 December 2001 – 24 June 2002	Rome group; pro-Jamiat-e Islami	Sunni Sayyid (Kabul)
Urban Development	Abdul Qadeer	22 December 2001 – 24 June 2002	Northern Alliance; Hezb-e Islami Khalis; Arsala clan	Pashtun (Nangarhar)
Rural Development	Abdul Malik Anwar	22 December 2001 – 24 June 2002	Northern Alliance	Tajik (Kapisa)
Border Affairs	Amanullah Zadran	22 December 2001 – 24 June 2002	Rome group	Pashtun (Paktia)
Refugee Affairs	Enayatullah Nazari	22 December 2001 – 24 June 2002	Northern Alliance; pro-Jamiat-e Islami; pro-Fahim	Tajik (Parwan)
Labor and Social Affairs	Mirwais Sadiq	22 December 2001 – 24 June 2002	Northern Alliance; pro-Jamiat-e Islami; pro-Ismail Khan	Tajik (Herat)
Martyrs and Disabled Affairs	Abdullah Wardak	22 December 2001 – 24 June 2002	Northern Alliance; pro-Ittehad-e Islami	Pashtun (Wardak)
Planning	Mohammad Mohaqiq	22 December 2001 – 24 June 2002	Northern Alliance; Hezb-e Wahdat	Hazara (Balkh)
Transportation	Sultan Hamid Sultan	22 December 2001 – 24 June 2002	Northern Alliance	Hazara (Kabul)
Civil Aviation and Tourism	Abdul Rahman	22 December 2001 – 14 February 2002	Rome group	Nuristani
Civil Aviation and Tourism	vacant	14 February – March 2002		
Civil Aviation and Tourism	Zalmai Rassoul	March – 24 June 2002	Rome group; pro-Karzai	Pashtun (Kabul)
Haj and Mosques	Mohammad Hanif Balkhi	22 December 2001 – 24 June 2002	none	Shiite (Balkh)
Women's Affairs	Sima Samar	22 December 2001 – 24 June 2002	Rome group	Hazara (Ghazni)

=== Karzai transitional cabinet (2002–2004) ===
The Bonn Agreement of December 2001 had installed an interim government, the 2002 Loya Jirga subsequently elected a transitional administration. From July 2002 until the presidential elections in October 2004, the Transitional Administration governed Afghanistan.

Karzai transitional cabinet
Portfolio	Name	Year(s)	Affiliation	Origin
Role
President	Hamid Karzai	24 June 2002 – 24 December 2004	Rome group	Pashtun (Kandahar)
First Vice President	Mohammad Qasim Fahim	24 June 2002 – 24 December 2004	Northern Alliance; pro-Jamiat-e Islami; pro-Massoud	Tajik (Panjshir)
Second Vice President	Karim Khalili	24 June 2002 – 24 December 2004	Northern Alliance; Hezb-e Wahdat	Hazara (Wardak)
Vice President	Abdul Qadeer	24 June – 6 July 2002	Northern Alliance; Hezb-e Islami Khalis; Arsala clan	Pashtun (Nangarhar)
Vice President	Hedayat Amin Arsala	late June 2002 – 24 December 2004	Rome group; Mahaz-e Milli; Arsala clan	Pashtun (Kabul)
Vice President	Nematullah Shahrani	late June 2002 – 24 December 2004	none	Uzbek (Badakhshan)
Key ministries
Foreign Affairs	Abdullah Abdullah	24 June 2002 – 24 December 2004	Northern Alliance; pro-Jamiat-e Islami; pro-Massoud	Tajik (Panjshir)
Defense	Mohammad Qasim Fahim	24 June 2002 – 24 December 2004	Northern Alliance; pro-Jamiat-e Islami; pro-Massoud	Tajik (Panjshir)
Interior	Taj Mohammad Wardak	24 June 2002 – 28 January 2003	Northern Alliance; pro-Jamiat-e Islami; Hezb-e Isteqlal-e Milli; pro-Qanuni	Pashtun
Interior	Ali Ahmad Jalali	28 January 2003 – 24 December 2004	pro-Western technocrat	Pashtun (Kabul)
Special Security Advisor for Interior Affairs	Yunus Qanuni	24 June 2002 – 24 December 2004	Northern Alliance; Jamiat-e Islami; pro-Massoud	Tajik (Panjshir)
Justice	Abdul Rahim Karimi	24 June 2002 – 24 December 2004	Northern Alliance; pro-Jamiat-e Islami	Uzbek (Takhar)
Finance	Ashraf Ghani	24 June 2002 – 24 December 2004	pro-Western technocrat	Pashtun (Logar)
other ministries
Commerce	Sayed Mustafa Kazemi	24 June 2002 – 24 December 2004	Northern Alliance; Hezb-e Wahdat	Shiite Sayyid (Parwan)
Education	Yunus Qanuni	24 June 2002 – 24 December 2004	Northern Alliance; Jamiat-e Islami; pro-Massoud	Tajik (Panjshir)
Higher Education	Sharif Fayez	24 June 2002 – 24 December 2004	Northern Alliance; pro-Ismail Khan	Tajik (Herat)
Public Works	Abdul Qadeer	24 June – 6 July 2002	Northern Alliance; Hezb-e Islami Khalis; Arsala clan	Pashtun (Nangarhar)
Public Works	vacant	6 – 20 July 2002		
Public Works	Abdul Ali	20 July 2002 – 24 December 2004	pro-Western technocrat	Pashtun
Reconstruction	Amin Farhang	24 June 2002 – 24 December 2004	Rome group	Tajik (Kabul)
Public Health	Sohaila Siddiqi	24 June 2002 – 24 December 2004	none	Pashtun (Kabul)
Communications	Mohammed Masoom Stanekzai	24 June 2002 – 24 December 2004	pro-Western technocrat	Pashtun (Logar)
Mines and Industries	Juma Muhammad Muhammadi	24 June 2002 – 24 February 2003	pro-Western technocrat; pro-Republican	Pashtun
Mines and Industries	Mohammad Mahfoz Nidaie (acting)	after 24 February 2003 – before 10 June 2004	none	Pashtun
Mines and Industries	Hakim Taniwal (acting)	before 10 June – 24 December 2004	pro-Western technocrat	Pashtun (Khost)
Light Industries and Foodstuffs	Mohammed Alim Razm	24 June 2002 – 24 December 2004	Northern Alliance; pro-Junbish-e Milli	Uzbek
Agriculture and Livestock	Sayed Hussain Anwari	24 June 2002 – 24 December 2004	Northern Alliance; Harakat-e Islami	Shiite Sayyid (Parwan)
Water and Power	Mohammad Shakir Kargar	24 June 2002 – 24 December 2004	Northern Alliance; pro-Junbish-e Milli; pro-Dostum	Uzbek (Faryab)
Irrigation and Environment	Ahmad Yusuf Nuristani	24 June 2002 – 24 December 2004	pro-Western technocrat; pro-Rome group	Pashtun
Information and Culture	Sayed Makhdoom Raheen	24 June 2002 – 24 December 2004	Rome group; pro-Jamiat-e Islami	Sunni Sayyid (Kabul)
Urban Development	Yousef Pashtun	24 June 2002 – 15 August 2003	pro-Western technocrat	Pashtun (Kandahar)
Urban Development	Gul Agha Sherzai	15 August 2003 – 24 December 2004	pro-Karzai	Pashtun (Kandahar)
Rural Development	Haneef Atmar	24 June 2002 – 24 December 2004	none	Pashtun (Laghman)
Border and Tribal Affairs	Mohammad Arif Noorzai	24 June 2002 – 24 December 2004	Northern Alliance; pro-Karzai; pro-Ittehad-e Islami	Pashtun (Kandahar)
Refugee Affairs	Enayatullah Nazari	24 June 2002 – 24 December 2004	Northern Alliance; pro-Jamiat-e Islami; pro-Fahim	Tajik (Parwan)
Labor and Social Affairs	Noor Mohammad Qarqin	24 June 2002 – 24 December 2004	pro-Northern Alliance	Turkmen (Jowzjan)
Martyrs and Disabled	Abdullah Wardak	24 June 2002 – 24 December 2004	Northern Alliance; pro-Ittehad-e Islami	Pashtun (Wardak)
Planning	Mohammad Mohaqiq	24 June 2002 – 24 December 2004	Northern Alliance; Hezb-e Wahdat	Hazara (Balkh)
Transportation	Sayed Mohammad Ali Jawid	24 June 2002 – 24 December 2004	Northern Alliance; Harakat-e Islami	Shiite Sayyid (Balkh)
Civil Aviation and Tourism	Mirwais Sadiq	24 June 2002 – 24 December 2004	Northern Alliance; pro-Jamiat-e Islami; pro-Ismail Khan	Tajik (Herat)
Haj and Mosques	Mohammad Amin Naseryar	24 June 2002 – 24 December 2004	unknown	Pashtun
Women's Affairs	vacant	24 – 28 June 2002		
Women's Affairs	Habiba Sorabi	28 June 2002 – 24 December 2004	none	Hazara (Ghazni)
Minister of State for Women's Affairs	Mahboba Hoqooqmal	28 June 2002 – 24 December 2004	none	Hazara (Kabul)

== Islamic Republic (2004–2021) ==
=== First Karzai cabinet (2004–2010) ===
Karzai cabinet
Portfolio	Name	Year(s)	Affiliation	Origin
Role
President	Hamid Karzai	24 December 2004 – 18 January 2010	Rome group	Pashtun (Kandahar)
First Vice President	Ahmad Zia Massoud	24 December 2004 – 19 November 2009	Northern Alliance; Jamiat-e Islami	Tajik (Panjshir)
First Vice President	Mohammad Qasim Fahim	19 November 2009 – 18 January 2010	Northern Alliance; pro-Jamiat-e Islami; pro-Massoud	Tajik (Panjshir)
Second Vice President	Karim Khalili	24 December 2004 – 18 January 2010	Northern Alliance; Hezb-e Wahdat	Hazara (Wardak)
Senior Minister	did not exist before 22 March 2006			
Senior Minister	Hedayat Amin Arsala	22 March 2006 – 19 November 2009	Rome group; Mahaz-e Milli; Arsala clan	Pashtun (Kabul)
Senior Minister	was dissolved after 19 November 2009			
Key ministries
Foreign Affairs	Abdullah Abdullah	24 December 2004 – 22 March 2006	Northern Alliance; pro-Jamiat-e Islami; pro-Massoud	Tajik (Panjshir)
Foreign Affairs	Rangin Dadfar Spanta (acting)	22 March 2006 – 18 January 2010	pro-Western technocrat	Tajik (Herat)
Defense	Abdul Rahim Wardak	24 December 2004 – 18 January 2010	pro-Western technocrat; pro-Rome group; Mahaz-e Milli	Pashtun (Wardak)
Interior	Ali Ahmad Jalali	24 December 2004 – 28 September 2005	pro-Western technocrat	Pashtun (Kabul)
Interior	Zarar Ahmad Osmani	28 September 2005 – 12 October 2008	pro-Northern Alliance; pro-Jamiat-e Islami; pro-Karzai	Tajik (Parwan)
Interior	Haneef Atmar	12 October 2008 – 18 January 2010	none	Pashtun (Laghman)
NDS	Amrullah Saleh	24 December 2004 – 18 January 2010	Northern Alliance; pro-Jamiat-e Islami; pro-Massoud	Tajik (Panjshir)
Justice	Sarwar Danish	24 December 2004 – 18 January 2010	pro-Northern Alliance; Hezb-e Wahdat; pro-Khalili	Hazara (Daykundi)
Finance	Anwar ul-Haq Ahady	24 December 2004 – 18 January 2010	pro-Western technocrat; Afghan Mellat	Pashtun (Kabul)
Finance	Omar Zakhilwal	24 December 2004 – 18 January 2010	pro-Western technocrat; pro-Afghan Mellat	Pashtun (Nangarhar)
other ministries
Commerce/ Commerce and Industry	Hedayat Amin Arsala	24 December 2004 – 22 March 2006	Rome group; Mahaz-e Milli; Arsala clan	Pashtun (Kabul)
Commerce/ Commerce and Industry	Mohammad Haidar Reza (acting)	22 March – 8 August 2006	unknown	Tajik
Commerce/ Commerce and Industry	Mohammad Amin Farhang	8 August 2006 – late 2008	Rome group; pro-Western technocrat	Tajik (Kabul)
Commerce/ Commerce and Industry	Wahidullah Shahrani	late 2008 – 18 January 2010	pro-Western technocrat	Uzbek (Badakhshan)
Mines and Industries/ Mines	Mir Mohammad Sediq	24 December 2004 – 22 March 2006	unknown	unknown
Mines and Industries/ Mines	Ibrahim Adel	22 March 2006 – 18 January 2010	unknown	Tajik (Parwan)
Economy	Mohammad Amin Farhang	24 December 2004 – 8 August 2006	Rome group; pro-Western technocrat	Tajik (Kabul)
Economy	Mohammad Jalil Shams	8 August 2006 – 18 January 2010	pro-Northern Alliance; pro-Western technocrat	Tajik (Herat)
Education	Noor Mohammad Qarqin	24 December 2004 – 22 March 2006	pro-Northern Alliance	Turkmen (Jowzjan)
Education	Haneef Atmar	22 March 2006 – 12 October 2008	none	Pashtun (Laghman)
Education	Ghulam Farooq Wardak	12 October 2008 – 18 January 2010	Hezb-e Islami	Pashtun (Wardak)
Higher Education	Amir Shah Hasanyar	24 December 2004 – 22 March 2006	pro-Western technocrat	Hazara (Bamyan)
Higher Education	Mohammad Azam Dadfar	22 March 2006 – 18 January 2010	pro-Western technocrat	Uzbek (Faryab)
Public Works	Suhrab Ali Safari	24 December 2004 – 18 January 2010	pro-Western technocrat	Hazara (Wardak)
Public Health	Mohammad Amin Fatemi	24 December 2004 – 18 January 2010	pro-Northern Alliance; pro-Jebh-e Nejat-e Melli; pro-Mojaddedi	Sunni Sayyid (Nangarhar)
Communications and IT	Amirzai Sangin	24 December 2004 – 18 January 2010	pro-Western technocrat	Pashtun (Paktika)
Agriculture, Irrigation and Livestock	Obaidullah Rameen	24 December 2004 – 12 October 2008	pro-Northern Alliance; Ittehad-e Islami	Tajik (Baghlan)
Agriculture, Irrigation and Livestock	Mohammad Asif Rahimi	12 October 2008 – 18 January 2010	pro-Western technocrat	Tajik (Kabul)
Energy and Water	Ismail Khan	24 December 2004 – 18 January 2010	Northern Alliance; Jamiat-e Islami	Tajik (Herat)
Information and Culture/ Culture and Youth	Sayed Makhdoom Raheen	24 December 2004 – 8 August 2006	Rome group; pro-Jamiat-e Islami	Sunni Sayyid (Kabul)
Information and Culture/ Culture and Youth	Karim Khoram	8 August 2006 – 18 January 2010	pro-Western technocrat; Hezb-e Islami	Pashtun (Wardak)
Youth Affairs	Amina Afzali	24 December 2004 – 22 March 2006	pro-Northern Alliance; Jamiat-e Islami	Tajik (Herat)
Youth Affairs	was merged with the Ministry of Information and Culture on 22 March 2006			
Urban Development Affairs	Yousef Pashtun	24 December 2004 – 18 January 2010	Rome group; pro-Western technocrat	Pashtun (Kandahar)
Rural Rehabilitation and Development	Haneef Atmar	24 December 2004 – 22 March 2006	none	Pashtun (Laghman)
Rural Rehabilitation and Development	Mohammed Ehsan Zia	22 March 2006 – 18 January 2010	pro-Western technocrat	Pashtun (Kabul)
Borders, Nations and Tribal Affairs	Abdul Karim Brahui	24 December 2004 – 11 October 2008	pro-Northern Alliance	Baloch (Nimroz)
Borders, Nations and Tribal Affairs	Asadullah Khalid	11 October 2008 – 18 January 2010	Northern Alliance; Ittehad-e Islami; pro-Sayyaf; pro-Karzai	Pashtun (Ghazni)
Refugees and Repatriates Affairs	Mohammad Azam Dadfar	24 December 2004 – 22 March 2006	pro-Western technocrat	Uzbek (Faryab)
Refugees and Repatriates Affairs	Akbar Akbar	22 March 2006 – 11 October 2008	unknown	Pashtun
Refugees and Repatriates Affairs	Abdul Karim Brahui	11 October 2008 – 18 January 2010	pro-Northern Alliance	Baloch (Nimroz)
Labor and Social Affairs/Labor, Social Affairs, Martyrs and Disabled	Sayed Ikramuddin Masoomi	24 December 2004 – 22 March 2006	pro-Northern Alliance	Sunni Sayyid (Takhar)
Labor and Social Affairs/Labor, Social Affairs, Martyrs and Disabled	Noor Mohammad Qarqin	22 March 2006 – 18 January 2010	pro-Northern Alliance	Turkmen (Jowzjan)
Martyrs and Disabled	Sediqa Balkhi	24 December 2004 – 22 March 2006	pro-Northern Alliance	Shiite Sayyid (Balkh)
Martyrs and Disabled	was merged with the Ministry of Labor and Social Affairs on 22 March 2006			
Transportation and Civil Aviation	Enayatullah Qasemi	24 December 2004 – 22 March 2006	pro-Western technocrat; pro-Hezb-e Wahdat; pro-Mohaqiq	Hazara (Helmand)
Transportation and Civil Aviation	Gul Hussain Ahmadi (acting)	22 March – 8 August 2006	unknown	Hazara (Balkh)
Transportation and Civil Aviation	Nematullah Ehsan Jawid	8 August 2006 – March 2008	pro-Northern Alliance; pro-Hezb-e Wahdat; pro-Mohaqiq	unknown
Transportation and Civil Aviation	Hamidullah Qaderi	March – 10 November 2008	unknown	Pashtun (Kandahar)
Transportation and Civil Aviation	Omar Zakhilwal (acting)	10 November 2008 – 7 February 2009	pro-Western technocrat; pro-Afghan Mellat	Pashtun (Nangarhar)
Transportation and Civil Aviation	Hamidullah Farooqi	7 February 2009 – 18 January 2010	pro-Western technocrat	Pashtun (Herat)
Hajj and Religious Affairs	Nematullah Shahrani	24 December 2004 – 18 January 2010	none	Uzbek (Badakhshan)
Women's Affairs	Massouda Jalal	24 December 2004 – 22 March 2006	none	Tajik (Kapisa)
Women's Affairs	Soraya Rahim Sobhrang (acting)	22 March – 8 August 2006	none	Hazara (Herat)
Women's Affairs	Husn Banu Ghazanfar	8 August 2006 – 18 January 2010	none	Uzbek (Balkh)
Counter Narcotics	Habibullah Qaderi	24 December 2004 – March 2008	unknown	Pashtun (Kandahar)
Counter Narcotics	Khodaidad	March 2008 – 18 January 2010	pro-Northern Alliance; Hezb-e Wahdat; pro-Khalili	Hazara (Uruzgan)

=== Second Karzai cabinet (2010–2015) ===
After winning a second term, President Hamid Karzai nominated 23 ministers in December 2009 to be part of his new administration but only 7 were approved by the National Assembly. All the other candidates that Karzai initially selected were rejected by members of the National Assembly. Karzai presented a second list of 18 candidates to the Wolesi Jirga on 9 January 2010. A week later, the Wolesi Jirga again approved only seven of the candidates. Since then, part of the ministries have been governed by acting ministers who do not held approval of the Afghan legislature. The 14 approved ministers were sworn in on 18 January 2010. Major changes to the cabinet were made when the Wolesi held votes of confidence for nominated ministers, particularly on 28 June 2010 were five ministers were approved, leaving only six of the 25 ministries left with an acting minister, 5 March 2012, 15 September 2012, 25 September 2013 and 25 December 2013.

When Ashraf Ghani was inaugurated as the new President of Afghanistan on 29 September 2014, he kept the ministers of the Karzai cabinet as acting ministers until the new National Unity Government could be formed with Abdullah Abdullah. However, after two months at the end of November 2014, he replaced all acting ministers with their respective deputy ministers to show that he would respect the constitution where it says a minister can only stay in office in an acting role for a maximum of two months. These new cabinet ministers stayed in office until the new government was formed in February 2015.

Karzai cabinet
Portfolio	Name	Year(s)	Affiliation	Origin
Role
President	Hamid Karzai	18 January 2010 – 29 September 2014	Rome group	Pashtun (Kandahar)
President	Ashraf Ghani	29 September 2014 – 1 February 2015	pro-Western technocrat	Pashtun (Logar)
CEO	Abdullah Abdullah	29 September 2014 – 1 February 2015	Northern Alliance; pro-Jamiat-e Islami; pro-Massoud	Tajik (Panjshir)
First Vice President	Mohammad Qasim Fahim	18 January 2010 – 9 March 2014	Northern Alliance; pro-Jamiat-e Islami; pro-Massoud	Tajik (Panjshir)
First Vice President	vacant	9 – 18 March 2014		
First Vice President	Yunus Qanuni	18 March – 29 September 2014	Northern Alliance; Jamiat-e Islami; pro-Massoud	Tajik (Panjshir)
First Vice President	Abdul Rashid Dostum	29 September 2014 – 1 February 2015	Northern Alliance; Junbish-e Milli	Uzbek (Jowzjan)
Second Vice President	Karim Khalili	18 January 2010 – 29 September 2014	Northern Alliance; Hezb-e Wahdat	Hazara (Wardak)
Second Vice President	Sarwar Danish	29 September 2014 – 1 February 2015	pro-Northern Alliance; Hezb-e Wahdat; pro-Khalili	Hazara (Daykundi)
First Deputy CEO	Mohammad Khan	29 September 2014 – 1 February 2015	Hezb-e Islami	Pashtun (Ghazni)
Second Deputy CEO	Mohammad Mohaqiq	29 September 2014 – 1 February 2015	Northern Alliance; Hezb-e Wahdat	Hazara (Balkh)
Key ministries
Foreign Affairs	Zalmai Rassoul	18 January 2010 – 28 October 2013	Rome group; pro-Karzai	Pashtun (Kabul)
Foreign Affairs	Zarar Ahmad Osmani	28 October 2013 – 11 December 2014	pro-Northern Alliance; pro-Jamiat-e Islami; pro-Karzai	Tajik (Parwan)
Foreign Affairs	Atiqullah Atifmal (acting)	11 December 2014 – 1 February 2015	pro-Western technocrat; pro-Karzai	Pashtun (Logar)
Defense	Abdul Rahim Wardak	18 January 2010 – 7 August 2012	pro-Western technocrat; pro-Rome group; Mahaz-e Milli	Pashtun (Wardak)
Defense	vacant	7 – 8 August 2012		
Defense	Enayatullah Nazari (acting)	8 August – 15 September 2012	Northern Alliance; pro-Jamiat-e Islami; pro-Fahim	Tajik (Parwan)
Defense	Bismillah Khan Mohammadi	15 September 2012 – 1 December 2014	Northern Alliance; Jamiat-e Islami; pro-Massoud; pro-Fahim	Tajik (Panjshir)
Defense	Enayatullah Nazari (acting)	1 December 2014 – 1 February 2015	Northern Alliance; pro-Jamiat-e Islami; pro-Fahim	Tajik (Parwan)
Interior	Haneef Atmar	18 January – 6 June 2010	none	Pashtun (Laghman)
Interior	Munir Mangal (acting)	6 – 30 June 2010	none	Pashtun (Paktia)
Interior	Bismillah Khan Mohammadi	30 June 2010 – 15 September 2012	Northern Alliance; Jamiat-e Islami; pro-Massoud; pro-Fahim	Tajik (Panjshir)
Interior	Ghulam Mujtaba Patang	15 September 2012 – 1 September 2013	pro-Khalq; pro-Noor; pro-Fahim	Pashtun (Logar)
Interior	Mohammad Omar Daudzai	1 September 2013 – 1 December 2014	pro-Hezb-e Islami	Pashtun (Kabul)
Interior	Mohammad Ayub Salangi (acting)	1 December 2014 – 1 February 2015	none	Tajik (Parwan)
NDS	Amrullah Saleh	18 January 2010 – 6 June 2010	Northern Alliance; pro-Jamiat-e Islami; pro-Massoud	Tajik (Panjshir)
NDS	Ibrahim Spinzada (acting)	6 June – 5 July 2010	pro-Karzai	Pashtun (Kandahar)
NDS	Rahmatullah Nabil	5 July 2010 – 29 August 2012	pro-Karzai; pro-Ibrahim	Pashtun (Wardak)
NDS	vacant	29 August – 15 September 2012		
NDS	Asadullah Khalid	15 September – 7 December 2012	Northern Alliance; Ittehad-e Islami; pro-Sayyaf; pro-Karzai	Pashtun (Ghazni)
NDS	Hisamuddin Hisam (acting)	7 December 2012 – 3 April 2013	pro-Northern Alliance; pro-Jamiat-e Islami; pro-Fahim	Tajik (Panjshir)
NDS	Asadullah Khalid	3 April – 31 August 2013	Northern Alliance; Ittehad-e Islami; pro-Sayyaf; pro-Karzai	Pashtun (Ghazni)
NDS	Rahmatullah Nabil (acting)	31 August 2013 – 14 March 2014	pro-Karzai; pro-Ibrahim	Pashtun (Wardak)
NDS	Asadullah Khalid	14 March – 1 December 2014	Northern Alliance; Ittehad-e Islami; pro-Sayyaf; pro-Karzai	Pashtun (Ghazni)
NDS	Rahmatullah Nabil	1 December 2014 – 1 February 2015	pro-Karzai; pro-Ibrahim	Pashtun (Wardak)
Finance	Omar Zakhilwal	18 January 2010 – 11 December 2014	pro-Western technocrat; pro-Afghan Mellat	Pashtun (Nangarhar)
Finance	Mohammad Mustafa Mastoor (acting)	11 December 2014 – 1 February 2015	pro-Northern Alliance; pro-Jamiat-e Islami; pro-Abdullah	Tajik (Panjshir)
Justice	Habibullah Ghaleb	18 January 2010 – 20 March 2014	Rome group; pro-Jamiat-e Islami; pro-Mojaddedi	Tajik (Kapisa)
Justice	vacant	20 March – 1 December 2014		
Justice	Sayed Yousuf Halim (acting)	1 December 2014 – 1 February 2015	none	Sunni Sayyid (Nangarhar)
other ministries
Mines	Wahidullah Shahrani	18 January 2010 – 28 October 2013	pro-Western technocrat	Uzbek (Badakhshan)
Mines	Mohammad Akbar Barakzai	28 October 2013 – 1 December 2014	pro-Hezb-e Islami; pro-Hamdard; pro-Sabawoon	Pashtun (Baghlan)
Mines	Mir Ahmad Jawid Sadat (acting)	1 December 2014 – 1 February 2015	pro-Western technocrat	Sunni Sayyid (Balkh)
Economy	Abdul Hadi Arghandiwal	18 January 2010 – 1 December 2014	Hezb-e Islami	Pashtun (Kabul)
Economy	Hakim Khan Habibi (acting)	1 December 2014 – 1 February 2015	pro-Ghani	Pashtun (Logar)
Information and Culture	Sayed Makhdoom Raheen	18 January 2010 – 1 December 2014	Rome group; pro-Jamiat-e Islami	Sunni Sayyid (Kabul)
Information and Culture	Ghulam Nabi Farahi (acting)	1 December 2014 – 21 January 2015	pro-Ghani	Pashtun (Farah)
Information and Culture	Sayed Mossadeq Khalili (acting)	21 January – 1 February 2015	pro-Western technocrat	Shiite Sayyid
Education	Ghulam Farooq Wardak	18 January 2010 – 1 December 2014	Hezb-e Islami	Pashtun (Wardak)
Education	Mohammad Asif Nang (acting)	1 December 2014 – 21 January 2015	none	Pashtun (Paktia)
Education	Mohammad Shafiq Samim (acting)	21 January – 1 February 2015	none	Pashtun
Higher Education	Sarwar Danish (acting)	18 January 2010 – 9 March 2012	pro-Northern Alliance; Hezb-e Wahdat; pro-Khalili	Hazara (Daykundi)
Higher Education	Obaidullah Obaid	9 March 2012 – 1 December 2014	pro-Hezb-e Islami; pro-Sabawoon	Tajik (Kabul)
Higher Education	Muhammad Osman Baburi (acting)	1 December 2014 – 1 February 2015	none	Turkmen
Commerce and Industry	Ghulam Mohammad Yelaqi (acting)	18 January – 30 June 2010	pro-Northern Alliance; pro-Hezb-e Wahdat; pro-Mohaqiq	Hazara (Balkh)
Commerce and Industry	Anwar ul-Haq Ahady	30 June 2010 – 28 October 2013	pro-Western technocrat; Afghan Mellat	Pashtun (Kabul)
Commerce and Industry	Mohammad Shakir Kargar	28 October 2013 – 11 December 2014	Northern Alliance; pro-Junbish-e Milli; pro-Dostum	Uzbek (Faryab)
Commerce and Industry	Mozammil Shinwari (acting)	11 December 2014 – 1 February 2015	pro-Western technocrat	Pashtun
Energy and Water	Ismail Khan	18 January 2010 – 28 October 2013	Northern Alliance; Jamiat-e Islami	Tajik (Herat)
Energy and Water	Mohammad Arif Noorzai	28 October 2013 – 1 December 2014	Northern Alliance; pro-Karzai; pro-Ittehad-e Islami	Pashtun (Kandahar)
Energy and Water	Ghulam Farooq Qarizada (acting)	1 December 2014 – 1 February 2015	unknown	unknown
Transportation and Civil Aviation	Mohammadullah Batash (acting)	18 January – 30 June 2010	pro-Northern Alliance; pro-Junbish-e Milli; pro-Dostum	Uzbek (Kunduz)
Transportation and Civil Aviation	Daud Ali Najafi	30 June 2010 – 1 December 2014	pro-Karzai	Hazara (Ghazni)
Transportation and Civil Aviation	Ghulam Ali Rasukh (acting)	1 December 2014 – 1 February 2015	unknown	unknown
Public Works	Suhrab Ali Safari (acting)	18 January 2010 – 30 June 2010	pro-Western technocrat	Hazara (Wardak)
Public Works	Abdul Qudoos Hamidi	30 June 2010 – 9 March 2012	none	Uzbek (Jowzjan)
Public Works	Najibullah Awzhang	9 March 2012 – 1 December 2014	none	Pashtun (Ghazni)
Public Works	Nurgul Mangal (acting)	1 December 2014 – 1 February 2015	unknown	unknown
Women's Affairs	Husn Banu Ghazanfar	18 January 2010 – 11 December 2014	none	Uzbek (Balkh)
Women's Affairs	Sayeda Mujgan Mustafawi (acting)	11 December 2014 – 1 February 2015	none	Hazara
Hajj and Religious Affairs	Yusuf Niazi	18 January 2010 – 1 December 2014	none	Pashtun (Nangarhar)
Hajj and Religious Affairs	Daee-ul-Haq Abed (acting)	1 December 2014 – 1 February 2015	unknown	unknown
Public Health	Suraya Dalil	18 January 2010 – 1 December 2014	none	Uzbek (Kabul)
Public Health	Ahmad Jan Naim (acting)	1 December 2014 – 1 February 2015	unknown	unknown
Agriculture, Irrigation and Livestock	Mohammad Asif Rahimi	18 January 2010 – 1 December 2014	pro-Western technocrat	Tajik (Kabul)
Agriculture, Irrigation and Livestock	Salim Khan Kunduzi (acting)	1 December 2014 – 1 February 2015	none	Pashtun (Kunduz)
Communications and IT	Amirzai Sangin	18 January 2010 – 1 December 2014	pro-Western technocrat	Pashtun (Paktika)
Communications and IT	Baryalai Hassam (acting)	1 December 2014 – 1 February 2015	pro-Western technocrat	Tajik (Badakhshan)
Rural Rehabilitation and Development	Jarullah Mansouri	18 January 2010 – 9 March 2012	pro-Northern Alliance; pro-Jamiat-e Islami; pro-Fahim	Tajik (Takhar)
Rural Rehabilitation and Development	Wais Ahmad Barmak	9 March 2012 – 1 December 2014	pro-Northern Alliance; pro-Fahim	Tajik (Panjshir)
Rural Rehabilitation and Development	Tareq Osmani (acting)	1 December 2014 – 1 February 2015	unknown	unknown
Labor, Social Affairs, Martyrs and Disabled	Amina Afzali	18 January 2010 – 1 December 2014	pro-Northern Alliance; Jamiat-e Islami	Tajik (Herat)
Labor, Social Affairs, Martyrs and Disabled	Wasel Nur Mohmand (acting)	1 December 2014 – 1 February 2015	unknown	Pashtun
Borders, Nations and Tribal Affairs	Arsala Jamal (acting)	18 January – 30 June 2010	pro-Western technocrat; pro-Hezb-e Islami	Pashtun (Paktika)
Borders, Nations and Tribal Affairs	Asadullah Khalid	30 June 2010 – 15 September 2012	Northern Alliance; Ittehad-e Islami; pro-Sayyaf; pro-Karzai	Pashtun (Ghazni)
Borders, Nations and Tribal Affairs	vacant	15 September 2012 – 10 July 2013		
Borders, Nations and Tribal Affairs	Mohammad Akram Khpalwak	10 July 2013 – 1 December 2014	pro-Hezb-e Islami; pro-Karzai	Pashtun
Borders, Nations and Tribal Affairs	Sayed Ahmad Haqbin (acting)	1 December 2014 – 1 February 2015	Northern Alliance; Jamiat-e Islami	Sunni Sayyid (Kapisa)
Urban Development Affairs	Sultan Hussein Hesari (acting)	18 January 2010 – 9 March 2012	pro-Western technocrat	Hazara (Kabul)
Urban Development Affairs	Mirza Hussain Abdullahi	9 March 2012 – 1 December 2014	pro-Northern Alliance; pro-Hezb-e Wahdat; pro-Mohaqiq	Hazara (Ghazni)
Urban Development Affairs	Hamed Jalil (acting)	1 December 2014 – 1 February 2015	unknown	unknown
Counter Narcotics	Zarar Ahmad Osmani	18 January 2010 – 28 October 2013	pro-Northern Alliance; pro-Jamiat-e Islami; pro-Karzai	Tajik (Parwan)
Counter Narcotics	Din Mohammad Mobariz Rashidi	28 October 2013 – 1 December 2014	Northern Alliance; Hezb-e Wahdat	Shiite (Sar-e-Pol)
Counter Narcotics	Haroon Rashid Sherzad (acting)	1 December 2014 – 1 February 2015	pro-Western technocrat	Pashtun (Nangarhar)
Refugees and Repatriates Affairs	Abdul Rahim Sayed Jan (acting)	18 January – 30 June 2010	Northern Alliance; Jamiat-e Islami; pro-Rabbani	Tajik (Badakhshan)
Refugees and Repatriates Affairs	Jamahir Anwari	30 June 2010 – 1 December 2014	none	Turkmen (Faryab)
Refugees and Repatriates Affairs	Fazl Ahmad Azimi (acting)	1 December 2014 – 1 February 2015	unknown	unknown

=== First Ghani cabinet (2015–2020) ===
National Unity Government
Portfolio	Name	Year(s)	Affiliation	Origin
Role
President	Ashraf Ghani	1 February 2015 – 9 March 2020	pro-Western technocrat	Pashtun (Logar)
CEO	Abdullah Abdullah	1 February 2015 – 9 March 2020	Northern Alliance; pro-Jamiat-e Islami; pro-Massoud	Tajik (Panjshir)
First Vice President	Abdul Rashid Dostum	1 February 2015 – 9 March 2020	Northern Alliance; Junbish-e Milli	Uzbek (Jowzjan)
Second Vice President	Sarwar Danish	1 February 2015 – 9 March 2020	pro-Northern Alliance; Hezb-e Wahdat; pro-Khalili	Hazara (Daykundi)
First Deputy CEO	Mohammad Khan	1 February 2015 – 9 March 2020	Hezb-e Islami	Pashtun (Ghazni)
Second Deputy CEO	Mohammad Mohaqiq	1 February 2015 – 24 January 2019	Northern Alliance; Hezb-e Wahdat	Hazara (Balkh)
Key ministries
Foreign Affairs	Salahuddin Rabbani (acting)	1 February 2015 – 23 October 2019	Northern Alliance; Jamiat-e Islami; pro–Rabbani; pro–Abdullah	Tajik (Badakhshan)
Foreign Affairs	vacant	23 – 30 October 2019		
Foreign Affairs	Idrees Zaman (acting)	30 October 2019 – 22 January 2020	unknown	Pashtun
Foreign Affairs	Haroon Chakhansuri (acting)	22 January – 9 March 2020	pro-Ghani	Pashtun (Nimruz)
Defense	Enayatullah Nazari (acting)	1 February – 24 May 2015	Northern Alliance; pro-Jamiat-e Islami; pro-Fahim	Tajik (Parwan)
Defense	Mohammed Masoom Stanekzai (acting)	24 May 2015 – 5 May 2016	pro-Western technocrat; pro-Karzai; pro–Ghani	Pashtun (Logar)
Defense	Abdullah Khan Habibi	5 May 2016 – 24 April 2017	pro-Ghani	Pashtun (Kunar)
Defense	Tariq Shah Bahramee	24 April 2017 – 23 December 2018	pro-Ghani	Pashtun (Laghman)
Defense	Asadullah Khalid (acting)	23 December 2018 – 9 March 2020	Northern Alliance; Ittehad-e Islami; pro-Sayyaf; pro-Karzai	Pashtun (Ghazni)
Interior	Nur ul-Haq Ulumi	1 February 2015 – 6 February 2016	pro-Northern Alliance; Jabha-ye Milli; pro-Parcham; pro–Abdullah	Pashtun (Kandahar)
Interior	vacant	6 – 24 February 2016		
Interior	Taj Mohammad Jahed	24 February 2016 – 14 August 2017	Northern Alliance; pro-Jamiat-e Islami; pro-Fahim	Tajik (Panjshir)
Interior	Wais Ahmad Barmak	14 August 2017 – 23 December 2018	pro-Northern Alliance; pro-Fahim	Tajik (Panjshir)
Interior	Amrullah Saleh (acting)	23 December 2018 – 19 January 2019	Northern Alliance; pro-Jamiat-e Islami; pro-Massoud	Tajik (Panjshir)
Interior	vacant	19 January – 11 February 2019		
Interior	Massoud Andarabi (acting)	11 February 2019 – 9 March 2020	pro-Abdullah	Tajik (Baghlan)
NDS	Rahmatullah Nabil	1 February – 10 December 2015	pro-Karzai; pro-Ibrahim; pro-Ghani	Pashtun (Wardak)
NDS	vacant	10 – 11 December 2015		
NDS	Massoud Andarabi (acting)	11 December 2015 – 5 May 2016	pro-Abdullah	Tajik (Baghlan)
NDS	Mohammed Masoom Stanekzai (acting)	5 May 2016 – 5 September 2019	pro-Western technocrat; pro-Karzai; pro–Ghani	Pashtun (Logar)
NDS	vacant	5 – 11 September 2019		
NDS	Ahmad Zia Saraj (acting)	11 September 2019 – 9 March 2020	pro-Western technocrat	Tajik (Kapisa)
Finance	Eklil Ahmad Hakimi	1 February 2015 – 26 June 2018	pro–Ghani	Pashtun (Laghman)
Finance	vacant	26 June – 18 July 2018		
Finance	Humayoun Qayoumi (acting)	18 July 2018 – 9 March 2020	pro-Western technocrat	Pashtun (Kabul)
Justice	Sayed Yousuf Halim (acting)	1 February – 21 April 2015	none	Sunni Sayyid (Nangarhar)
Justice	Abdul Basir Anwar	21 April 2015 – 9 March 2020	pro–Abdullah	Tajik (Parwan)
other ministries
Mines	Daud Shah Saba	1 February 2015 – 28 March 2016	pro–Ghani	Pashtun (Herat)
Mines	vacant	28 March – 16 April 2016		
Mines	Ghazal Habibyar Safi (acting)	16 April 2016 – 1 April 2017	unknown	unknown
Mines	Nargis Nehan (acting)	1 April 2017 – 9 March 2020	unknown	Hazara (Kabul)
Economy	Hakim Khan Habibi (acting)	1 February – 21 April 2015	pro-Ghani	Pashtun (Logar)
Economy	Abdul Sattar Murad	21 April 2015 – 7 August 2017	Northern Alliance; Jamiat-e Islami; pro–Abdullah	Tajik (Parwan)
Economy	Mohammad Mustafa Mastoor	7 August 2017 – 9 March 2020	pro-Northern Alliance; pro-Jamiat-e Islami; pro-Abdullah	Tajik (Panjshir)
Information and Culture	Sayed Mossadeq Khalili (acting)	1 February – 21 April 2015	pro-Western technocrat	Shiite Sayyid
Information and Culture	Abdul Bari Jahani	21 April 2015 – 7 November 2016	pro–Ghani	Pashtun (Kandahar)
Information and Culture	Kamal Sadat (acting)	7 November 2016 – after 6 March 2017	pro-Ghani	Sunni Sayyid (Kunar)
Information and Culture	various caretaker ministers	after 6 March 2017 – 25 June 2018		
Information and Culture	Hasina Safi (acting)	25 June 2018 – 9 March 2020	pro-Ghani	Pashtun (Laghman)
Education	Mohammad Shafiq Samim (acting)	1 February – 21 April 2015	none	Pashtun
Education	Assadullah Hanif Balkhi (acting)	21 April 2015 – 25 March 2018	pro–Abdullah	Tajik (Balkh)
Education	Mirwais Balkhi (acting)	25 March 2018 – 9 March 2020	unknown	Tajik (Balkh)
Higher Education	Muhammad Osman Baburi (acting)	1 February – after 17 March 2015	none	Turkmen
Higher Education	Bari Sediqi (acting)	after 17 March 2015 – 21 April 2015	unknown	unknown
Higher Education	Farida Momand (acting)	21 April 2015 – 22 June 2017	pro–Ghani	Pashtun (Nangarhar)
Higher Education	Abdul Latif Roshan (acting)	22 June – 22 November 2017	pro–Ghani	Tajik
Higher Education	Najibullah Khwaja Omari	22 November 2017 – 25 May 2019	pro–Ghani	Hazara (Ghazni)
Higher Education	Abdul Tawab Balakarzai (acting)	25 May 2019 – 9 March 2020	unknown	Pashtun
Commerce and Industry	Mozammil Shinwari (acting)	1 February – 21 April 2015	pro-Western technocrat	Pashtun
Commerce and Industry	Humayoon Rasaw	21 April 2015 – 6 February 2019	pro–Abdullah	Hazara (Ghazni)
Commerce and Industry	Ajmal Ahmady (acting)	6 February 2019 – 9 March 2020	pro-Ghani	Tajik (Ghazni)
Energy and Water	Ghulam Farooq Qarizada (acting)	1 February – 21 April 2015	unknown	unknown
Energy and Water	Ali Ahmad Osmani	21 April 2015 – 9 June 2018	pro–Abdullah	Tajik (Herat)
Energy and Water	Mohammad Gul Khulmi (acting)	9 June 2018 – 24 May 2019	unknown	Tajik (Samangan)
Energy and Water	Tahir Sharan (acting)	24 May 2019 – 26 January 2020	unknown	Hazara
Energy and Water	Khan Mohammad Takal (acting)	26 January – 19 February 2020	unknown	Pashtun
Energy and Water	was dissolved on 19 February 2020			
Transportation and Civil Aviation	Ghulam Ali Rasukh (acting)	1 February – 21 April 2015	unknown	unknown
Transportation and Civil Aviation	Mohammadullah Batash (acting)	21 April 2015 – 25 July 2017	pro-Northern Alliance; pro-Junbish-e Milli; pro-Dostum; pro-Ghani	Uzbek (Kunduz)
Transportation and Civil Aviation	Mohammad Hamid Tahmasi	25 July 2017 – 29 January 2020	pro–Ghani	Hazara (Ghazni)
Transportation and Civil Aviation	Mohammad Yama Shams (acting)	29 January – 9 March 2020	unknown	Pashtun (Kabul)
Public Works	Nurgul Mangal (acting)	1 February – 21 April 2015	unknown	unknown
Public Works	Mahmoud Baligh (acting)	21 April 2015 – 7 August 2017	pro–Ghani	Hazara (Daykundi)
Public Works	Yama Yari	7 August 2017 – 9 March 2020	pro–Ghani	Pashtun (Herat)
Women's Affairs	Sayeda Mujgan Mustafawi (acting)	1 February – 21 April 2015	none	Hazara
Women's Affairs	Delbar Nazari	21 April 2015 – 9 March 2020	pro–Abdullah	Uzbek (Balkh)
Hajj and Religious Affairs	Faiz Mohammad Osmani	1 February 2015 – 9 March 2020	pro–Ghani	Turkmen (Kunduz)
Public Health	Ferozuddin Feroz	1 February 2015 – 9 March 2020	pro–Abdullah	Tajik (Panjshir)
Agriculture, Irrigation and Livestock	Salim Khan Kunduzi (acting)	1 February – 21 April 2015	none	Pashtun (Kunduz)
Agriculture, Irrigation and Livestock	Assadullah Zamir	21 April 2015 – 21 September 2017	pro–Ghani	Tajik (Kabul)
Agriculture, Irrigation and Livestock	Nasir Ahmad Durrani	21 September 2017 – 9 March 2020	pro–Abdullah	Pashtun (Logar)
Communications and IT	Baryalai Hassam (acting)	1 February – 21 April 2015	pro-Western technocrat	Tajik (Badakhshan)
Communications and IT	Abdul Razaq Wahidi (acting)	21 April 2015 – 2 January 2017	pro–Abdullah	Hazara (Kabul)
Communications and IT	vacant	2 – 8 January 2017		
Communications and IT	Sayed Ahmad Shah Sadaat (acting)	8 January – 7 August 2017	pro-Western technocrat	Sunni Sayyid (Nangarhar)
Communications and IT	Shahzad Gul Aryoubi	7 August 2017 – 24 May 2019	unknown	Pashtun (Khost)
Communications and IT	Fahim Hashimi (acting)	24 May 2019 – 9 March 2020	pro–Abdullah	Hazara (Kabul)
Rural Rehabilitation and Development	Nasir Ahmad Durrani	1 February 2015 – 21 September 2017	pro–Abdullah	Pashtun (Logar)
Rural Rehabilitation and Development	Mujib Rahman Karimi	21 September 2017 – 9 March 2020	pro–Ghani	Pashtun (Khost)
Labor, Social Affairs, Martyrs and Disabled/ Labor and Social Affairs	Wasel Nur Mohmand (acting)	1 February – 21 April 2015	unknown	Pashtun
Labor, Social Affairs, Martyrs and Disabled/ Labor and Social Affairs	Nasrin Oryakhil (acting)	21 April 2015 – 1 May 2017	pro–Ghani	Pashtun (Kabul)
Labor, Social Affairs, Martyrs and Disabled/ Labor and Social Affairs	Faizullah Zaki	1 May 2017 – 9 March 2020	pro-Dostum; pro-Ghani	Uzbek (Jowzjan)
Borders, Nations and Tribal Affairs	Sayed Ahmad Haqbin (acting)	1 February – 21 April 2015	Northern Alliance; Jamiat-e Islami	Sunni Sayyid (Kapisa)
Borders, Nations and Tribal Affairs	Mohammad Gulab Mangal	21 April 2015 – 16 October 2016	pro-PDPA; pro–Ghani	Pashtun (Paktia)
Borders, Nations and Tribal Affairs	vacant	16 October 2016 – 26 May 2017		
Borders, Nations and Tribal Affairs	Abdul Ghafoor Liwal (acting)	26 May – 25 July 2017	pro–Ghani	Pashtun (Kabul)
Borders, Nations and Tribal Affairs	Gul Agha Sherzai	25 July 2017 – 9 March 2020	pro–Karzai; pro–Ghani	Pashtun (Kandahar)
Urban Development Affairs	Hamed Jalil (acting)	1 February – 21 April 2015	unknown	unknown
Urban Development Affairs	Sadat Mansoor Naderi	21 April 2015 – 13 June 2018	pro-Western technocrat; pro–Ghani	Shiite Sayyid (Baghlan)
Urban Development Affairs	Roshaan Wolusmal (acting)	13 June – 2 December 2018	unknown	Pashtun
Urban Development Affairs	Mohammad Jawad Paikar (acting)	2 December 2018 – 9 March 2020	unknown	Pashtun
Counter Narcotics	Haroon Rashid Sherzad (acting)	1 February – 21 April 2015	pro-Western technocrat	Pashtun (Nangarhar)
Counter Narcotics	Salamat Azimi	21 April 2015 – 27 January 2019	pro–Ghani	Uzbek (Faryab)
Counter Narcotics	was merged into the Ministry of Interior on 27 January 2019			
Refugees and Repatriates Affairs	Alami Balkhi	1 February 2015 – 9 March 2020	Northern Alliance; pro–Qanuni; pro–Abdullah; pro–Karzai	Shiite Sayyid (Balkh)
Central Bank	Khan Afzal Hadawal (acting)	1 February – 8 July 2015	none	Pashtun
Central Bank	Khalilullah Sediq	8 July 2015 – 9 March 2020	pro–Ghani	Pashtun (Logar)

=== Second Ghani cabinet (2020–2021) ===
National Unity Government
Portfolio	Name	Year(s)	Affiliation	Origin
Role
President	Ashraf Ghani	9 March 2020 – 15 August 2021	pro-Western technocrat	Pashtun (Logar)
First Vice President	Amrullah Saleh	9 March 2020 – 15 August 2021	Northern Alliance; pro-Jamiat-e Islami; pro-Massoud	Tajik (Panjshir)
Second Vice President	Sarwar Danish	9 March 2020 – 15 August 2021	pro-Northern Alliance; Hezb-e Wahdat; pro-Khalili	Hazara (Daykundi)
Key ministries
Foreign Affairs	Haroon Chakhansuri (acting)	9 March 2020 – 4 April 2020	pro-Western technocrat; pro-Ghani	Pashtun (Nimruz)
Foreign Affairs	Haneef Atmar	4 April 2020 – 15 August 2021	none: pro-Ghani	Pashtun (Laghman)
Defense	Asadullah Khalid	9 March 2020 – 19 March 2021	Northern Alliance; Ittehad-e Islami; pro-Sayyaf; pro-Karzai; pro-Ghani	Pashtun (Ghazni)
Defense	Yasin Zia (caretaker)	19 March – 24 May 2021	pro-Northern Alliance; pro-Jamiat-e Islami	Tajik (Takhar)
Defense	Asadullah Khalid	24 May – 19 June 2021	Northern Alliance; Ittehad-e Islami; pro-Sayyaf; pro-Karzai; pro-Ghani	Pashtun (Ghazni)
Defense	Bismillah Khan Mohammadi (acting)	19 June – 15 August 2021	Northern Alliance; Jamiat-e Islami; pro-Massoud; pro-Fahim	Tajik (Panjshir)
Interior	Massoud Andarabi	9 March 2020 – 19 March 2021	pro-Western technocrat; pro-Abdullah	Tajik (Baghlan)
Interior	Hayatullah Hayat (acting)	19 March – 19 June 2021	none: pro-Ghani	Pashtun (Nangarhar)
Interior	Abdul Sattar Mirzakwal (acting)	19 June – 15 August 2021	none	Pashtun (Paktia)
NDS	Ahmad Zia Saraj	9 March 2020 – 15 August 2021	pro-Western technocrat	Tajik (Kapisa)
Finance	Humayoun Qayoumi (acting)	9 – 31 March 2020	pro-Western technocrat	Pashtun (Kabul)
Finance	Abdul Hadi Arghandiwal	31 March 2020 – 23 January 2021	Hezb-e Islami; pro-Ghani	Pashtun (Kabul)
Finance	Khalid Payenda (acting)	23 January – 10 August 2021	pro-Western technocrat; pro-Ghani	Pashtun
Finance	Alam Shah Ibrahimi (caretaker)	10 – 15 August 2021	pro-Western technocrat	unknown
Justice	Abdul Basir Anwar (acting)	9 March – 31 August 2020	Northern Alliance; Harakat-e Islami; pro-Abdullah	Tajik (Parwan)
Justice	Fazel Ahmed Manawi	31 August 2020 – 15 August 2021	Northern Alliance; Jamiat-e Islami; pro-Massoud; pro-Abdullah	Tajik (Panjshir)
other ministries
Mines	Nargis Nehan (acting)	9 March – 11 June 2020	pro-Western technocrat	Hazara (Kabul)
Mines	Haroon Chakhansuri	11 June 2020 – 15 August 2021	pro-Western technocrat; pro-Ghani	Pashtun (Nimruz)
Economy	Mohammad Mustafa Mastoor (acting)	9 March – 14 September 2020	pro-Northern Alliance; pro-Jamiat-e Islami; pro-Abdullah	Tajik (Panjshir)
Economy	Karima Hamed Faryabi	14 September 2020 – 15 August 2021	pro-Western technocrat; pro-Abdullah	Uzbek (Faryab)
Information and Culture	Hasina Safi (acting)	9 March – 9 June 2020	none: pro-Ghani	Pashtun (Laghman)
Information and Culture	Tahir Zuhair (acting)	9 June 2020 – 15 August 2021	none: pro-Ghani	Hazara (Samangan)
Education	Mirwais Balkhi (acting)	9 March – 10 June 2020	Northern Alliance; Jamiat-e Islami	Tajik (Balkh)
Education	Rangina Hamidi (acting)	10 June 2020 – 15 August 2021	pro-Western technocrat; pro-Ghani	Pashtun (Kandahar)
Higher Education	Abdul Tawab Balakarzai (acting)	9 March – 31 August 2020	pro-Western technocrat	Pashtun
Higher Education	Abas Basir	31 August 2020 – 15 August 2021	pro-Northern Alliance; pro-Khalili; pro-Abdullah	Hazara (Ghazni)
Commerce and Industry	Ajmal Ahmady (acting)	9 March – 3 June 2020	pro-Western technocrat; pro-Ghani	Tajik (Ghazni)
Commerce and Industry	vacant	3 June – 31 August 2020		
Commerce and Industry	Nisar Ahmad Ghoryani	31 August 2020 – 15 August 2021	none: pro-Abdullah	Tajik (Herat)
Transportation and Civil Aviation	Mohammad Yama Shams (acting)	9 March – 31 August 2020	none: pro-Ghani	Pashtun (Kabul)
Transportation and Civil Aviation	Qudratullah Zaki	31 August 2020 – 15 August 2021	none: pro-Abdullah	Uzbek (Takhar)
Public Works	Yama Yari (acting)	9 March – 16 June 2020	pro-Western technocrat	Pashtun (Herat)
Public Works	Mohammad Yama Shams (acting)	16 June – 6 October 2020	none: pro-Ghani	Pashtun (Kabul)
Public Works	Najibullah Yamin	6 October 2020 – 15 August 2021	none: pro-Ghani	Pashtun (Logar)
Women's Affairs	Delbar Nazari (acting)	9 March – 18 May 2020	pro-Western technocrat; pro-Abdullah	Uzbek (Balkh)
Women's Affairs	Hasina Safi (acting)	18 May 2020 – 15 August 2021	none: pro-Ghani	Pashtun (Laghman)
Hajj and Religious Affairs	Faiz Mohammad Osmani (acting)	9 March – 6 August 2020	none: pro-Ghani	Turkmen (Kunduz)
Hajj and Religious Affairs	Mohammad Qasim Halimi	6 August 2020 – 15 August 2021	none: pro-Ghani; ex-Taliban	Pashtun (Logar)
Public Health	Ferozuddin Feroz (acting)	9 March – 31 May 2020	pro-Western technocrat; pro-Abdullah	Tajik (Panjshir)
Public Health	Ahmad Jawed Osmani	31 May – 31 December 2020	Northern Alliance; pro-Jamiat-e Islami; pro-Noor; pro-Ghani	Tajik (Balkh)
Public Health	vacant	31 December 2020 – 29 January 2021		
Public Health	Wahid Majrooh (acting)	29 January – 15 August 2021	pro-Western technocrat	Pashtun (Herat)
Agriculture, Irrigation and Livestock	Nasir Ahmad Durrani (acting)	9 March – 31 August 2020	pro-Hezb-e Islami; pro-Arghandiwal; pro-Abdullah	Pashtun (Logar)
Agriculture, Irrigation and Livestock	Anwar ul-Haq Ahady	31 August 2020 – 15 August 2021	pro-Western technocrat; Afghan Mellat; pro-Abdullah	Pashtun (Kabul)
Communications and IT	Fahim Hashimi (acting)	9 March 2020 – 15 August 2021	none: pro-Abdullah	Hazara (Kabul)
Communications and IT	Masooma Khawari	31 August 2020	pro-Northern Alliance; pro-Hezb-e Wahdat; pro-Mohaqiq; pro-Abdullah	Hazara (Samangan)
Rural Rehabilitation and Development	Mujib Rahman Karimi (acting)	9 March – 15 August 2021	none: pro-Ghani	Pashtun (Khost)
Labor and Social Affairs	Faizullah Zaki (acting)	9 March – 31 August 2020	pro-Dostum; pro-Ghani	Uzbek (Jowzjan)
Labor and Social Affairs	Bashir Ahmad Tahyanj	31 August 2020 – 15 August 2021	Northern Alliance; Junbish-e Milli; pro-Abdullah	Uzbek (Faryab)
Martyrs and Disabled Affairs	was re-established on 25 January 2021			
Martyrs and Disabled Affairs	Hamidullah Farooqi	25 January – 15 August 2021	pro-Western technocrat; pro-Ghani	Pashtun (Herat)
Borders, Nations and Tribal Affairs	Gul Agha Sherzai (acting)	9 March – 31 August 2020	pro-Karzai; pro-Ghani	Pashtun (Kandahar)
Borders, Nations and Tribal Affairs	Mohibullah Samim	31 August 2020 – 15 August 2021	none: pro-Abdullah	Pashtun (Ghazni)
Urban Development Affairs	Mohammad Jawad Paikar (acting)	9 March – 1 June 2020	none	Pashtun
Urban Development Affairs	Mahmud Karzai	1 June 2020 – 15 August 2021	pro-Karzai; pro-Ghani	Pashtun (Kandahar)
Refugees and Repatriates Affairs	Alami Balkhi (acting)	9 March – 31 August 2020	Northern Alliance; pro-Qanuni; pro-Abdullah; pro-Karzai	Shiite Sayyid (Balkh)
Refugees and Repatriates Affairs	Noor Rahman Akhlaqi	31 August 2020 – 15 August 2021	Northern Alliance; Jamiat-e Islami; pro-Abdullah	Tajik (Baghlan)
Central Bank	Khalilullah Sediq (acting)	9 March 2020 – 3 June 2020	pro-Western technocrat; pro-Ghani	Pashtun (Logar)
Central Bank	Ajmal Ahmady (acting)	3 June 2020 – 15 August 2021	pro-Western technocrat; pro-Ghani	Tajik (Ghazni)

== Islamic Emirate (2021–present) ==
=== Post-Republic transitional government (2021) ===
On the first days of the new regime, tentative nominations to the cabinet were announced until late August 2021, including the acting ministers of Public Works, Water and Energy, Education and the acting Head of the Central Bank among other high-ranking officials. Supreme Leader Hibatullah Akhundzada directly appointed the caretaking ministers. Additionally, Wahid Majrooh, a minister of the old regime, stayed in office after cooperating with the Taliban until the end of September.

Taliban transitional cabinet
Portfolio	Name	Years	Affiliation	Origin
Role
Key ministries
Defense	Abdul Qayyum Zakir	24 August – 7 September 2021	Taliban	Pashtun (Helmand)
Interior	Ibrahim Sadr	24 August – 7 September 2021	Taliban	Pashtun (Helmand)
Intelligence	Rahmatullah Najib	24 August – 7 September 2021	Taliban	Pashtun (Paktia)
Finance	Gul Agha Ishakzai	24 August – 7 September 2021	Taliban	Pashtun (Kandahar)
other ministries
Central Bank	Haji Mohammad Idris	23 August – 7 September 2021	Taliban	Uzbek (Jowzjan)
Education	Hemat Akhundzada	23 August – 7 September 2021	Taliban	Pashtun
Higher Education	Abdul Baqi Haqqani	24 August – 7 September 2021	Taliban	Pashtun (Nangarhar)
Public Works	Bakht-ur-Rehman Sharafat	21 August – 7 September 2021	Taliban	Pashtun (Zabul)
Public Health	Wahid Majrooh	15 August – 7 September 2021	none	Pashtun (Herat)
Water and Energy	unknown	22 August – 7 September 2021		

=== Akhund cabinet (2021–) ===
On 7 September 2021, a men-only "caretaker cabinet" was appointed by Akhundzada, headed by Hasan Akhund as Prime Minister. The Ministry of Women's Affairs was abolished. This was followed by three more major rounds of appointments on 21 September, 4 October and 23 November 2021. Among those were the nominations of two Taliban veterans as deputy ministers.

Akhund cabinet
Portfolio	Name	Years	Affiliation	Origin
Role
Prime Minister	Hasan Akhund	7 September 2021 – 17 May 2023	Taliban	Pashtun (Kandahar)
Prime Minister	Abdul Kabir (caretaker)	17 May – 17 July 2023	Taliban	Pashtun (Paktika)
Prime Minister	Hasan Akhund	17 July 2023 – present	Taliban	Pashtun (Kandahar)
Deputy Prime Minister for Economic Affairs (Note: Sometimes inofficially labeled "First Deputy Prime Minister".)	Abdul Ghani Baradar	7 September 2021 – present	Taliban	Pashtun (Uruzgan)
Deputy Prime Minister for Administrative Affairs (Note: Sometimes inofficially labeled "Second Deputy Prime Minister".)	Abdul Salam Hanafi	7 September 2021 – present	Taliban	Uzbek (Jowzjan)
Deputy Prime Minister for Political Affairs (Note: Sometimes inofficially labeled "Third Deputy Prime Minister".)	Abdul Kabir	4 October 2021 – 10 January 2025	Taliban	Pashtun (Paktika)
Key ministries
Defense	Mullah Yaqoob	7 September 2021 – present	Taliban	Pashtun (Kandahar)
Foreign Affairs	Amir Khan Muttaqi	7 September 2021 – present	Taliban	Pashtun (Paktia)
Interior	Sirajuddin Haqqani	7 September 2021 – present	Taliban	Pashtun (Paktia)
Intelligence	Abdul Haq Wasiq	7 September 2021 – present	Taliban	Pashtun (Ghazni)
Justice	Abdul Hakim Haqqani	7 September 2021 – present	Taliban	Pashtun (Kandahar)
Finance	Gul Agha Ishakzai	7 September 2021 – 30 May 2023	Taliban	Pashtun (Kandahar)
Finance	Nasir Akhund	30 May 2023 – present	Taliban	Pashtun (Ghazni)
other ministries
Commerce and Industry	vacant	7 – 21 September 2021		
Commerce and Industry	Nooruddin Azizi	21 September 2021 – present	pro-Taliban	Tajik (Panjshir)
Mines and Petroleum	Mohammed Isa Akhund	7 September – 23 November 2021	Taliban	Pashtun (Kandahar)
Mines and Petroleum	Shahabuddin Delawar	23 November 2021 – 7 July 2024	Taliban	Pashtun (Logar)
Mines and Petroleum	Gul Agha Ishakzai	7 July 2024 – present	Taliban	Pashtun (Kandahar)
Economy	Din Mohammad Hanif	7 September 2021 – present	Taliban	Tajik (Badakhshan)
Central Bank	Haji Mohammad Idris	7 September – 8 October 2021	Taliban	Pashtun (Jowzjan)
Central Bank	Shakir Jalali	8 October 2021 – 22 March 2023	pro-Taliban	unknown
Central Bank	Gul Agha Ishakzai	22 March 2023 – 7 July 2024	Taliban	Pashtun (Kandahar)
Central Bank	Noor Ahmad Agha	7 July 2024 – present	Taliban	Pashtun (Kandahar)
Education	Noorullah Munir	7 September 2021 – 21 September 2022	Taliban	Pashtun (Ghazni)
Education	Habibullah Agha	21 September 2022 – present	Taliban	Pashtun (Kandahar)
Higher Education	Abdul Baqi Haqqani	7 September – 18 October 2022	Taliban	Pashtun (Nangarhar)
Higher Education	Neda Mohammad	18 October 2022 – present	Taliban	Pashtun (Kandahar)
Public Works	Abdul Manan Omari	7 September 2021 – 16 January 2023	Taliban	Pashtun (Kandahar)
Public Works	unknown	16 – 23 January 2023		
Public Works	Mohammed Isa Akhund	23 January 2023 – present	Taliban	Pashtun (Kandahar)
Urban Development and Housing	unknown	7 September 2021 – 15 January 2023		
Urban Development and Housing	Hamdullah Nomani	15 January 2023 – 29 June 2025	Taliban	Baloch (Ghazni)
Urban Development and Housing	Najibullah Haqqani	29 June 2025 – present	Taliban	
Rural Rehabilitation and Development	Mohammad Younus Akhundzada	7 September 2021 – 8 January 2026	Taliban	Pashtun (Kandahar)
Rural Rehabilitation and Development	Abdul Latif Mansoor	8 January 2026 – present	Taliban	Pashtun (Paktia)
Public Health	Wahid Majrooh	7 – 21 September 2021	none	Pashtun (Herat)
Public Health	Qalandar Ibad	21 September 2021 – 28 May 2024	Taliban	Pashtun (Paktika)
Public Health	Noor Jalal	28 May 2024 – present	Taliban	Pashtun (Kunar)
Communications and IT	Najibullah Haqqani	7 September 2021 – 29 June 2025	Taliban	
Communications and IT	Hamdullah Nomani	29 June 2025 – 4 May 2026	Taliban	Baloch (Ghazni)
Communications and IT	Abdul Ahad Fazli	4 May 2026 – present	Taliban	Pashtun (Helmand)
Agriculture, Irrigation and Livestock	vacant	7 – 22 September 2021		
Agriculture, Irrigation and Livestock	Abdul Rahman Rashid	22 September 2021 – 21 August 2022	Taliban; pro-Haqqani network	Uzbek
Agriculture, Irrigation and Livestock	Attaullah Omari	21 August 2022 – present	Taliban	Uzbek (Faryab)
Water and Energy	unknown	22 August – 7 September 2021		
Water and Energy	Abdul Latif Mansoor	7 September 2021 – 8 January 2026	Taliban	Pashtun (Paktia)
Water and Energy	Mohammad Younus Akhundzada	8 January 2026 – present	Taliban	Pashtun (Kandahar)
Information and Culture	Khairullah Khairkhwa	7 September 2021 – 1 September 2025	Taliban	Pashtun (Kandahar)
Information and Culture	Shir Ahmad Haqqani	1 September 2025 – present	Taliban	Pashtun (Wardak)
Borders and Tribal Affairs	Noorullah Noori	7 September 2021 – present	Taliban	Pashtun (Zabul)
Refugee and Repatriation	Khalil Haqqani	7 September 2021 – 11 December 2024	Taliban	Pashtun (Paktia)
Refugee and Repatriation	vacant	11 December 2024 – 10 January 2025		
Refugee and Repatriation	Abdul Kabir	10 January 2025 – present	Taliban	Pashtun (Paktika)
Labor and Social Affairs	vacant	7 September 2021 – 4 March 2022		
Labor and Social Affairs	Abdul Wali	4 March 2022 – 16 January 2023	Taliban	unknown
Labor and Social Affairs	Abdul Manan Omari	16 January 2023 – present	Taliban	Pashtun (Kandahar)
Martyrs and Disabled Affairs	vacant	7 September – 4 October 2021		
Martyrs and Disabled Affairs	Abdul Majeed Akhund	4 October 2021 – present	Taliban	Pashtun
Transport and Civil Aviation	Hamidullah Akhundzada	7 September 2021 – 16 February 2026	Taliban	Pashtun (Helmand)
Transport and Civil Aviation	Mohammad Fazl	16 February 2026 – present	Taliban	Pashtun (Uruzgan)
Hajj and Religious Affairs	Noor Mohammad Saqib	7 September 2021 – present	Taliban	Pashtun (Kabul)
Propagation of Virtue and Prevention of Vice	Sheikh Mohammad Khalid	7 September 2021 – present	Taliban	Nuristani (Nuristan)
Disaster Management	was not a ministry until 23 November 2021			
Disaster Management	Mohammad Abbas Akhund	23 November 2021 – 7 July 2024	Taliban	Pashtun (Uruzgan)
Disaster Management	Nooruddin Turabi	7 July 2024 – present	Taliban	Pashtun (Uruzgan)
