= Government ministries of Afghanistan =

There are 27 government ministries in Afghanistan.

== Current ministries ==
No.	Ministry	Minister	Founding	Website
1	Ministry of Energy and Water	Abdul Latif Mansour	1980	mew.gov.af/en
2	Ministry of Rural Rehabilitation and Development	Mohammad Younus Akhundzada	1954	mrrd.gov.af/en
3	Ministry of Hajj and Religious Affairs	Noor Mohammad Saqib	2001	mohia.gov.af/en
4	Ministry of Economy	Din Mohammad Hanif	1920	moec.gov.af/en
5	Ministry of Information and Culture	Khairullah Khairkhwa	2011	moic.gov.af/en
6	Ministry for the Propagation of Virtue and the Prevention of Vice	Mohammad Khalid Hanafi	1994	mopvpe.gov.af/en
7	Ministry of Foreign Affairs	Amir Khan Muttaqi	1907	mfa.gov.af/en
8	Ministry of Interior Affairs	Sirajuddin Haqqani	1919	moi.gov.af/en
9	Ministry of Borders and Tribal Affairs	Noorullah Noori	1962	mobta.gov.af/en
10	Ministry of Martyrs and Disabled Affairs	Abdul Majeed Akhund	2020	mmd.gov.af/en
11	Ministry of Refugee and Repatriation	Abdul Kabir	1980	morr.gov.af/en
12	Ministry of Higher Education	Neda Mohammad Nadim	1932	mohe.gov.af/en
13	Ministry of Transport and Civil Aviation	Mohammad Fazel Mazlum	1979	mot.gov.af/en
14	Ministry of Defense	Mohammad Yaqoob Mujahid	1947	mod.gov.af/en
15	Ministry of Agriculture, Irrigation and Livestock	Attaullah Omari	1918	mail.gov.af/en
16	Ministry of Urban Development and Housing	Najibullah Haqqani	2018	mudh.gov.af/en
17	Ministry of Public Health	Noor Jalal Jalali	1934	moph.gov.af/en
18	Ministry of Commerce and Industry	Nooruddin Azizi	1956	moci.gov.af/en
19	Ministry of Justice	Abdul Hakim Haqqani	1919	moj.gov.af/en
20	Ministry of Public Works	Mohammed Isa Thani	1933	mopw.gov.af/en
21	Ministry of Labour and Social Affairs	Abdul Manan Omari	1990	molsa.gov.af/en
22	Ministry of Finance	Mohammad Nassir Akhund	1919	mof.gov.af/en
23	Ministry of Communications and Information Technology	Hamdullah Nomani	1955	mcit.gov.af/en
24	Ministry of Mines and Petroleum	Hedayatulla Badri	1960	momp.gov.af/en
25	Ministry of Education	Habibullah Agha	1919	moe.gov.af/en

== Former ministries ==
Including:

- Ministry of Counter Narcotics
- Ministry of Women's Affairs
