= Government of Afghanistan =

Islamic Emirate of Afghanistan: د افغانستان اسلامي امارت (Pashto) Də Afġānistān Islāmī Imārat; امارت اسلامی افغانستان (Dari) Imārat-i Islāmī-yi Afghānistān
- Theocratic emirate
- Emblem of Afghanistan
- Formation: 15 August 2021 (current form); 4 April 1996 (First Islamic Emirate); 19 August 1919 (independence)
- Guiding document: 1998 dastur
- Country: Afghanistan
- Website: alemarahenglish.af

Leadership
- Head of state: Supreme Leader
- Deputy head of state: Deputy Leader
- Meeting place: Kandahar

Executive
- Head of government: Prime Minister
- Main body: Council of Ministers
- Deputy head of government: Deputy Prime Minister(s)
- Appointed by: Supreme Leader
- Headquarters: Arg, Kabul
- Departments: Ministries

Judiciary
- Court: Supreme Court
- Chief Justice: Chief Justice of the Islamic Emirate of Afghanistan
- Seat: Supreme Court Building, Kabul

The government of Afghanistan, officially called the Islamic Emirate of Afghanistan, is the central government of Afghanistan. Under the leadership of the Taliban, the government is a unitary state, theocracy, and an emirate with political power concentrated in the hands of a supreme leader and his clerical advisors, collectively referred to as the Leadership. The Leadership makes all major policy decisions behind closed doors, which are then implemented by the country's civil service and judiciary. As Afghanistan is an Islamic state, governance is based on Sharia law, which the Taliban enforces through extensive social and cultural policies. The government primarily consists of four different councils, namely the Leadership Council, Ulema Council of Kandahar, National Ulema Council, and the Central Dar-il-Ifta.

Over its history, Afghanistan has variously been governed as a monarchy, a republic, and a theocracy. The current theocratic government came to power in 2021 with the United States-led coalition's withdrawal after a twenty-year insurgency against the Western-backed Islamic Republic, after having itself been ousted in 2001.

The current government is internationally unrecognized and lacks a clear constitutional basis, though the Taliban announced plans in January 2022 to form a constitutional commission. The government currently applies Sharia law. There is no separation of powers, with total authority vested in the Leadership. The government is criticized by international observers for totalitarianism, systemic human rights violations, as well as for being unaccountable, opaque, and exclusive of women, religious and ethnic minorities, and those with dissenting views. Since coming to power, it has grappled with terrorist attacks and natural disasters.

== Leadership of the Islamic Emirate ==
=== Supreme Leader ===
The Supreme Leader of the Islamic Emirate of Afghanistan is the head-of-state, commander-in-chief, and religious leader of Afghanistan. These responsibilities include appointing and dismissing the cabinet, judiciary, armed forces general staff, and provincial and municipal governments, issuing decrees, special instructions, and orders regulating the operations of those mentioned above. The supreme leader also approves or vetos laws drafted by cabinet ministries, after they are vetted by the Ministry of Justice and a review committee for compliance with Islamic law. Supreme leaders have all served life terms, with their deputies appointed by the Leadership Council to succeed them.

The supreme leader is advised by an advisory council of four to six individuals on appointments, national security, and domestic and religious policy, which form an advisory committee. These individuals have the final say on all policy decisions.

=== Deputy Leader(s) ===
The deputy leader(s) of the Islamic Emirate of Afghanistan is the deputy head-of-state and is appointed by the supreme leader for an indefinite term. The deputy leader serves as acting top leader when the former is incapacitated or otherwise unavailable to execute their duties. However, there can be more than two deputy leaders, as was the case with Akhtar Mansoor promoting Haibatullah Akhundzada and Sirajuddin Haqqani to the positions. By norm, the first deputy leader succeeds the supreme leader upon death.

=== Leadership Council ===
The Leadership Council of Afghanistan (also known as the Supreme Council) is an advisory council to the Supreme Leader. The council is the supreme governing body of the Taliban and the Government of the Islamic Emirate. It functions under a consensus decision-making model, and is chaired by the supreme leader. The Leadership Council appoints the supreme leader in the event of a vacancy. The supreme leader convenes and chairs the council at his sole discretion. He has ultimate authority and may override or circumvent it at any time. The leadership council consists of thirty members.

=== Ulema Council of Kandahar ===
The Ulema Council of Kandahar, or Kandahar Provincial Council, is the de facto ruling and executive oversight body of the Islamic Emirate of Afghanistan. Despite being officially responsible for advising and overseeing the Kandahar provincial government, it also approves and disapproves all decisions made by the Kabul-based Council of Ministers.

All its members are ulema native to or residents of Kandahar province. The supreme leader appoints all 24 members, while the council itself is presided over by a chairman and deputy chairman and being assisted by a financial and administrative director.

=== Council of Ulema (national) ===
The Council of Ulema or Ulema Shura is the highest religious authority in Afghanistan. It is responsible for ensuring all policies by the executive conform to Sharia and can overrule decisions made by the Council of Ministers. Other responsibilities include the appointment, removal or replacement, and giving of allegiance, to the Supreme Leader.

=== Central Dar ul-Ifta ===
The General Directorate of the Central Dar ul-Ifta is responsible for issuing fatwas on various issues. It functions as a religious judicial body, allowed to make quasi-binding decisions on multiple topics its scholars deem to be in line with Islamic Law. Its director is appointed and dismissed by the supreme leader.

== Executive ==
=== Prime minister ===
The prime minister of the Islamic Emirate of Afghanistan is the appointed head of government. The prime minister is responsible for overseeing the civil service operations and presiding over the Council of Ministers. The prime minister's office is one of six institutions within the cabinet that are directly under the purview of the supreme leader.

The prime minister, along with the cabinet, is appointed and dismissed by the supreme leader for an undefined term.

=== Deputy Prime Ministers ===
The deputy prime ministers of the Islamic Emirate of Afghanistan are the appointed deputy heads of government, responsible for presiding overseeing the work of designated ministries and agencies who’ve been subordinated to the former and presiding over the Council of Ministers in the prime minister's absence or incapacity. Deputy prime ministers are also assigned specialized portfolios since 2021, overseeing technical commissions addressing critical issues.

Like the prime minister and cabinet, the deputy prime ministers are appointed and dismissed by the supreme leader for an undefined term.

=== Council of Ministers ===
The council of ministers of the Islamic Emirate of Afghanistan is the cabinet. It comprises 26 ministries whose agency executives administer the civil service and are overseen by the Prime Minister. The ministries are also responsible for preparing legislation in their respective areas of policy for vetting by the Ministry of Justice and approval or veto by the supreme leader. Despite being led by the prime minister, it is effectively answerable and subordinate to the Supreme Leader.

Portfolio	Name
Prime Minister	Hasan Akhund
Deputy Prime Minister for Economic Affairs	Abdul Ghani Baradar
Deputy Prime Minister for Administrative Affairs	Abdul Salam Hanafi
Deputy Prime Minister for Political Affairs	Abdul Kabir
Minister of Defence	Mohammad Yaqoob
State Minister of Disaster Management	Mohammad Abbas Akhund
Minister of Interior Affairs	Sirajuddin Haqqani
Minister of Foreign Affairs	Amir Khan Muttaqi
Minister of Finance	Gul Agha Ishakzai
Minister of Education	Habibullah Agha
Minister of Information and Culture	Khairullah Khairkhwa
Minister of Economy	Din Mohammad Hanif
Minister of Hajj and Religious Affairs	Noor Mohammad Saqib
Minister of Borders and Tribal Affairs	Noorullah Noori
Minister of Rural Rehabilitation and Development	Mohammad Younus Akhundzada
Minister of Preaching and Guidance, Propagation of Virtue and Prevention of Evil	Mohammad Khalid
Minister of Public Health	Maulawi Noor Jalal
Minister of Commerce and Industry	Nooruddin Azizi
Minister of Public Works	Abdul Manan Omari
Minister of Mines and Petroleum	Shahabuddin Delawar
Minister of Energy and Water	Abdul Latif Mansoor
Minister of Transport	Hamidullah Akhundzada
Minister of Higher Education	Neda Mohammad
Minister of Communications and Information Technology	Najibullah Haqqani
Minister of Refugees and Repatriation	Khalil Haqqani
Minister of Agriculture, Irrigation, and Livestock	Abdul Rahman Rashid
Minister of Martyrs and Disabled Affairs	Abdul Majeed Akhund
Minister of Labour and Social Affairs	Abdul Wali
Minister of Urban Development and Housing	Hamdullah Nomani

=== Commissions ===
Several commissions have been formed to handle issues and subjects seen as critical by the Islamic Emirate. Several cabinet ministers or ministry directors are appointed to chair these commissions. There are currently several commissions that have been formed since August 15, 2021.

- Economic Commission
- Administrative Commission
- Repatriation and Contact of Afghan Personalities Commission
- Security and Settlement Affairs Commission
- Declaration and Liquidation Commission
- Media Violations Commission
- Aid Submission Commission
- Political Commission
- National Procurement Commission
- High Commission for the Prevention and Restitution of State Land Grabbing
- High Commission for the Facilitation of Returning Refugees

== Judiciary ==
The judiciary of the Islamic Emirate of Afghanistan consists of the Supreme Court, Appellate Courts, Civil Courts, Primary Courts, Military Court, zonal Military Courts, and provincial Military Courts. All justices and court officials are appointed and dismissed by the Supreme Leader.

=== Supreme Court ===
The Supreme Court of the Islamic Emirate of Afghanistan is the court of final resort and oversees the civilian and military judiciary. Currently, the court comprises a chief justice and two deputy justices. In the first round of judicial appointments after the Fall of Kabul, the supreme court appointed all judges. Since then however, justices have been appointed by the Supreme Leader.

=== Appellate Court(s) ===
The appellate courts are the courts of second appeal operating at the provincial level. Each court is presided over by an appointed Chief Justice and assisted by a court clerk in administration alongside a mufti. Cases are heard from Primary Courts.

=== Primary Court(s) ===
Primary courts are the courts of the first instance, operating at the district level. Like the Appellate Courts, Primary Courts are presided over by an appointed chief justice presides over the court and are assisted by a clerk in administration alongside a mufti.

=== Military courts ===
The Islamic Emirate of Afghanistan also maintains a parallel military judicial system meant for hearing complaints, lawsuits, and petitions against personnel within the security forces. It consists of the Military Court, zonal Military Courts, and provincial Military Courts. The Military Courts have exclusive authority hear complaints, petitions, and complaints against staff from the Ministry of Defence, Ministry of Interior Affairs, and General Directorate of Intelligence.

==== Military Court ====
The Military Court of the Islamic Emirate of Afghanistan is the court of final resort for the hearing of complaints, lawsuits, and petitions against personnel from the Ministry of Defence, Ministry of Interior Affairs, and General Directorate of Intelligence. The court is presided over by an appointed Head of the Military Court who is assisted by two justices. Mawlawi Obaidullah Nizami is the current Head of the Military Court, and presides over the court alongside Mawlawi Sayyid Agha, and Mawlawi Zahid Akhundzada.

==== Zonal military courts ====
Eight military courts serve as a court of the second instance for complaints, petitions, and lawsuits, involving personnel within the areas security forces from the Ministry of Defence, Ministry of Interior Affairs, and General Directorate of Intelligence. These courts are led by an appointed 'executive commander' while judicial hearings are presided over by an appointed justice. Zonal military counters operate above provincial military courts.

==== Provincial military courts ====
Provincial military courts are courts of the first instance for complaints, lawsuits, and petitions security personnel at the provincial level. All cases are presided over by an appointed justice, which would be heard by the respective zonal military court if approved.

== Provincial governments ==
=== Provincial Ulema Council ===
The supreme leader appoints a provincial Ulema Councils, also known as the Council of Scholars, to oversee the governor and civil service. The council is given the power to advise the provincial government and overrule any policy or decision contrary to Islam.

Each council comprises 15 to 24 appointed religious scholars and tribal elders. An appointed chairman presides over the body, while a deputy chairman and financial and administrative director assist him.

=== Provincial governor ===
The provincial governor is appointed and dismissed by the supreme leader to oversee the province's administration under the regional ulema council. All governors supervise the work of local civil service and can issue instructions regulating or directing their work.

=== Provincial departments ===
Beneath the provincial governor is departments that manage the local civil service. These departments are regional directorates of ministries within the council of ministers. Directors appointed and dismissed by the supreme leader oversee the operation of their respective local departments. These departments at the provincial level are:

- Governor's Office
- Finance Department
- Education Department
- Agriculture, Livestock, and Irrigation Department
- Information and Culture Department
- Hajj and Religious Affairs Department
- Rural Rehabilitation and Development Department
- Preaching and Guidance, Propagation of Virtue and Prevention of Evil Department
- Public Works Department
- Refugee and Repatriation Department
- Intelligence Department

== Security forces ==
Internal and external security of the Islamic Emirate of Afghanistan are the responsibility of the Ministry of Interior Affairs and Ministry of Defence respectively. The heads of these two respective ministries are Mohammed Yaqoob, head of the Military Affairs Commission within the Rahbari Shura and son of Mullah Omar, and Sirajuddin Haqqani, head of the Haqqani Network.

Currently the Islamic Emirate Army is subdivided into eight corps, mostly superseding the previous corps of the Afghan National Army. In November 2021 Mullah Yaqoob, Acting Minister of Defense, announced the new names and of the corps.

== See also ==
- Recognition of the Islamic Emirate of Afghanistan
