= Abdul Qayyum Zakir =

Afghan Deputy Defence Minister since 2021

Mullah Abdul Qayyum Zakir
- عبدالقیوم ذاکر

Deputy Minister of Defence
- Incumbent
- Assumed office 21 September 2021 (Note: Acting: 21 September 2021 – 15 August 2025)
- Leader: Hibatullah Akhundzada
- Prime Minister: Hasan Akhund
- Preceded by: Mohammad Fazl (acting)

Acting Minister of Defence
- In office 24 August 2021 – 7 September 2021
- Leader: Hibatullah Akhundzada
- Preceded by: Bismillah Khan Mohammadi
- Succeeded by: Mullah Yaqoob

Personal details
- Born: 1973 (age 52–53) Kajaki, Helmand Province, Kingdom of Afghanistan
- Occupation: Politician, Taliban member

Military service
- Allegiance: Taliban (Islamic Emirate of Afghanistan)
- Branch/service: Sayyid Ala ud-Din Agha; Islamic Army of Afghanistan (1996-2001); Military Affairs Commission of the Islamic Emirate of Afghanistan; Army of the Islamic Emirate of Afghanistan (2021-present)
- Rank: Commander
- Unit: Sayyid Ala ud-Din Agha; 203 Mansoori Corps
- Commands: Deputy Chief of Army Staff; Head of the Military Affairs Commission (until 2014); Panjshir Brigade (since 2022); Andarab Regiment (since 2022)
- Battles/wars: Afghan Civil War (1996–2001); United States invasion of Afghanistan; War in Afghanistan (2001–2021); 2021 Taliban offensive; Fall of Kabul; Panjshir Conflict
- Released: 2007; Pul-e-Charkhi prison
- Detained at: Guantanamo
- Other names: Abdul Qhulam Rasoul; Abdullah Zakir; Qayyum Zakir; Y Abdhullah
- ISN: 8
- Status: Repatriated to Afghanistan, later released

Abdul Qayyum "Zakir" (born 1973), also known by the nom de guerre Abdullah Ghulam Rasoul, is a Taliban militant commander and the acting Deputy Minister of Defense of the current de facto government of Afghanistan. He was also the acting Defense Minister of the Taliban, from 24 August 2021 to 7 September 2021.

Zakir joined the Taliban movement in 1997 and took part in the Afghan civil war. He held the positions of deputy army commander, northern front commander and minister of defence for a short period during the first Taliban government of Afghanistan. Following the United States invasion of Afghanistan, Zakir surrendered to US forces and was interned in the US Guantanamo Bay detention camp in Cuba. He was transferred from US custody to Pul-e-Charkhi prison in Afghanistan, from where he was later released.

After his release, Zakir rose through the ranks of the Taliban, running military operations in Helmand and Nimroz provinces before becoming the Taliban's overall military commander. During his tenure he was often described as one of the movement's hardliners and was reported to maintain close links to Iran. In 2014, he stepped down, reportedly following an internal leadership dispute, then was appointed a deputy to the military head in 2020.

== Early life ==
Abdul Qayyum was born in the Kajaki District of Helmand Province in southern Afghanistan in 1973, and grew up in Jowzjan Province in northern Afghanistan. He is an ethnic Pashtun of the Alizai tribe. He studied at a religious school in Afghanistan before travelling to Pakistan, where he enrolled in a madrasa (religious school) in Quetta, Balochistan. The school was affiliated with an Afghan mujahideen group under the command of Mohammad Nabi Mohammadi that was fighting against the Soviets in Afghanistan.

== Taliban activities and Guantanamo Bay internment ==
Mohammad Nabi Mohammadi instructed Qayyum and Nematullah to join the Taliban movement after it formed, and they joined it in Spin Boldak District in eastern Kandahar Province of Afghanistan. Qayyum joined in 1997. His nom de guerre on the Taliban's walkie-talkie network was "Zakir", and he became commonly known by that name. During the Afghan civil war, Nematullah was killed in a fight against then warlord and later politician Ismail Khan in Herat province and Zakir took command of his group. During the Taliban rule in Afghanistan, Zakir held the positions of deputy army commander, northern front commander and minister of defence for a short period.

Zakir surrendered to United States-led forces in Mazar-i-Sharif in 2001 and was interned in the United States Guantanamo Bay detainment camps in Cuba. His Guantanamo Internment Serial Number was 8.

On March 4, 2010, Afghan intelligence officials said that the captive known as "Abdullah Ghulam Rasoul" was really "Abdul Qayyum", and that "Abdullah Ghulam Rasoul" had been his father's name. They reported his nom de guerre is "Qayyum Zakir". He was named "Abdullah Ghulam Rasoul" on most of the documents published by the US Department of Defense. He was named "Mullah Y Abdhullah" on the Summary of Evidence memo prepared for his 2007 annual Administrative Review Board.

Zakir was transferred from Guantanamo Bay to the American-renovated Block D of Pul-e-Charkhi prison in Afghanistan in December 2007. The Afghan government released him in May 2008, possibly due to pressure from tribal elders. Patrick Mercer, a member of the United Kingdom Parliament and its counter-terrorism subcommittee, expressed surprise that he had been allowed to rejoin the Taliban, wanting to know why he had been released. Peter M. Ryan, an American lawyer who represented another former captive who had been held in Pul-e-Charkhi, described the Afghan review procedure in Pul-e-Charkhi as "chaotic", and more influenced by tribal politics than by guilt or innocence.

== Return to Taliban leadership ==
After his release, Zakir joined the Taliban and was appointed the leader of the Gerdi Jangal Regional Military Shura, a regional military command that oversaw operations in Helmand and Nimroz provinces. On March 9, 2009, the Department of Defense reported that he had emerged as a Taliban leader. British officials believed he became the Taliban's operations commander for southern Afghanistan soon after his release and blamed him for masterminding an increase in roadside attacks against British and American troops. He was living in Quetta and had command of the four southern provinces of Helmand, Kandahar, Uruzgan and Zabul, with the power to appoint Taliban governors there.

The New York Times reported that Zakir led a December 2008-January 2009 delegation to the Pakistani Taliban to convince them to refocus their efforts away from the Pakistani government and towards the American-led forces in Afghanistan. Anand Gopal reported that Zakir helped write a Taliban "rule book" that sought to limit civilian casualties. In 2010, he was appointed as "surge commander" by the Taliban and was tasked with countering the surge of Coalition and Afghan forces and their strategy to deny the Taliban safe heavens in the southern provinces of Helmand and Kandahar.

On March 1, 2010, The News International reported that Zakir was part of the Taliban's Quetta Shura, and that he had been arrested by Pakistani authorities in recent raids along with nine other leaders, the most senior of whom was Abdul Ghani Baradar. In addition to Baradar, the raids were reported to have captured Mir Muhammad, Abdul Salam, Abdul Kabir, Mohammad Hassan Akhund, Abdul Rauf, Ahmad Jan Akhundzada and Muhammad Younis. Zakir was released without explanation. On March 4, 2010, the Associated Press reported "two senior Afghan intelligence officials" claimed Abdullah Ghulam Rasoul had emerged to be a senior Taliban leader, and that he was under consideration to replace Abdul Ghani Baradar as number two in the Taliban's chain of command, following Baradar's arrest. He did take over as the chief military commander in 2010.

The Wall Street Journal reported in April 2014 that Zakir had left the position of chief military commander. The Taliban leadership officially said that he stepped down due to "ill health". Some informants said that he was demoted, because of his strong opposition to peace talks with the Afghan Government and disagreements with more moderate leaders such as Akhtar Mansour. Zakir was succeeded by Ibrahim Sadar.

After the death of Taliban founding leader Mohammad Omar was announced in 2015, Mansour was appointed supreme leader. Zakir and others boycotted the process that appointed Mansour. He preferred Mohammad Yaqoob, Omar's eldest son, for the position. After some delay Zakir pledged allegiance to Mansour.

In May 2020, Yaqoob was appointed the head of the military, replacing Sadar, with Zakir and Sadar appointed his deputies.

In June 2020, Radio Free Europe/Radio Liberty described Zakir as an Iran-linked Taliban commander who opposed peace talks between the US, Afghan government and the Taliban.

During the 2021 Taliban offensive, he was one of the commander of Taliban forces in southern part of Afghanistan and led the march towards Kabul. He was reportedly the first to enter the presidential palace upon Ashraf Ghani’s flight. After the Taliban takeover of Afghanistan on 15 August 2021, Zakir was appointed as the Taliban's deputy minister of defense.

On 21 August 2022, Zakir was appointed the military commander of Panjshir province. Long War Journal notes that Zakir appointment to lead the fight against National Resistance Front (NRF) in Panjshir and the district of Andarab is a clear indication that the NRF is challenging the Taliban's primacy in central and northern Afghanistan.
