= Abdul Rauf Aliza =

Taliban/ISIS fighter (1981–2015)

Abdul Rauf Alizai
- Pashto: ملا عبد الرؤوف
- Born: February 10, 1981; Helmand Province, Afghanistan
- Died: June 9, 2015 (aged 34); Helmand Province, Afghanistan
- Cause of death: Drone strike
- Military career
- Allegiance: Taliban (unknown–2014); ISIS-K (from October 2014)
- Service number: 108 (Internment Serial Number)
- Conflicts: War in Afghanistan (2001–2021)

Mullah Abdul Rauf Aliza (Pashto: ملا عبد الرؤوف; 10 February 1981 – 9 May 2015), widely identified as Mullah Abdul Rauf Khadim, was an Afghan militant who served as a senior leader in both the Taliban and ISIS-K.

A foot soldier in Taliban leader Mullah Omar’s elite mobile reserve force prior to 9/11, he was detained by the United States after the initial invasion of Afghanistan, and transferred to Guantanamo Bay detention camp, where he was held until 20 December 2007. His Guantanamo Internment Serial Number was 108. Following his release, he returned to militancy in Afghanistan, becoming a provincial-level Taliban commander. After falling out with Taliban leadership in 2014, Rauf swore allegiance to ISIS and was named deputy commander of its Afghanistan-Pakistan based Wilayah Khorasan branch (ISIS-K), before being killed by an US drone strike in 09 May 2015.

== Background ==
Abdul Rauf claimed that he was from Helmand Province in Afghanistan, and that an injury from a Soviet landmine had left him too injured for military duties, so he had been employed providing food during his Taliban conscription. Having become a foot soldier for several known Taliban commanders, he eventually became a member of Taliban leader Mullah Omar’s elite mobile reserve force before the 9/11 attacks. He was the Taliban's last Governor of Kunar Province.

== Identity confusion ==
On 4 March 2010, the Associated Press reported that two former captives at Guantanamo had become senior Taliban leaders, after their release from Afghan custody. The report quoted "senior Afghan officials who said the two captives named Abdul Qayyum Zakir and Abdul Rauf Aliza were actually Abdul Qayyum and Abdul Rauf." They reported that Abdul Qayyum was being considered a candidate to replace recently captured Taliban second-in-command Mullah Abdul Ghani Baradar, and that Abdul Rauf was his deputy. The News International reported that both Abdul Qayyum Zakir and Abdul Rauf were members of the Taliban's Quetta Shura, then believed to be in Quetta, Pakistan, and that they had been captured shortly after Baradar.

Journalist Kathy Gannon of the Associated Press quoted former Helmand Governor Sher Mohammad Akhundzada about Abdul Rauf's role in the Taliban. Akhundzada asserted that prior to his initial capture in 2001 Abdul Rauf was a corps commander in Herat Province, and in Kabul.

== Official status reviews ==
Originally, the George W. Bush Presidency asserted that captives apprehended in the "war on terror" were not covered by the Geneva Conventions, and could be held indefinitely, without charge, and without an open and transparent review of the justifications for their detention. In 2004 the United States Supreme Court ruled, in Rasul v. Bush, that Guantanamo captives were entitled to being informed of the allegations justifying their detention, and were entitled to try to refute them.

=== Office for the Administrative Review of Detained Enemy Combatants ===
Following the Supreme Court's ruling the Department of Defense set up the Office for the Administrative Review of Detained Enemy Combatants.

A Summary of Evidence memo was prepared for his 2004 Combatant Status Review Tribunal, listing six allegations that justified his confinement. The allegations accused Abdul Rauf of joining the Taliban in 1998 and received military training. The allegations stated that Abdul Rauf: was issued a Kalishnikov rifle in Kunduz; fought for the Taliban; surrendered to Abdul Rashid Dostum's Northern Alliance forces; and was in possession of a Kalishnikov when he surrendered.

Abdul Rauf chose to participate in his Combatant Status Review Tribunal. The Department of Defense published a three-page summarized transcript on March 3, 2006.

A two-page Summary of Evidence memo was drafted for Abdul Rauf Aliza's first annual Administrative Review Board in 2005. The allegations from the 2005 memo added the following assertions: that Abdul Rauf claimed to be an involuntary conscript; that he had a handicap that meant that he could only be used as a delivery boy; that he "was identified as Mullah Abdul Rauf, a Taliban troop commander"; and that he was part of a small squad of conscripts who guarded a "communication building called Sadarat in Konduz".

The Department of Defense published a seven-page transcript from his review.

Four pages of heavily redacted decision memos were published in September 2007, indicating that Abdul Rauf Aliza was one of the 121 captives whose 2005 review recommended should be released of transferred. His memo was drafted on April 21, 2005, and Gordon R. England, the Designated Civilian Official who had the authority to clear him for release or transfer, initialed his authorization to transfer Abdul Rauf Aliza on 22 April 2005.

=== Formerly secret Joint Task Force Guantanamo assessment ===
On April 25, 2011, whistleblower organization WikiLeaks published formerly secret assessments drafted by Joint Task Force Guantanamo analysts. His JTF-GTMO assessment was three pages long, and was dated October 26, 2004. It started with a recommendation to his Administrative Review Board that he should be transferred from Guantanamo, for further detention, and characterized him as of low intelligence value and as a medium threat. The memo was signed by camp commandant Jay W. Hood.

In an article that conflated Abdul Rauf Aliza with a senior Taliban leader named Mullah Abdul Rauf, The Washington Post quoted from his formerly secret Joint Task Force Guantanamo assessment:

Cooperative, but his responses were vague or inconsistent when asked about the Taliban leadership. Detainee was in a position to have extensive knowledge of the opium trade in Afghanistan and could identify the individuals in the criminal organizations that were working with both the Taliban and the Northern Alliance in the opium trade.

Assessed not to be a threat, Rauf was recommended for transfer out and continued detainment in another country.

== Death ==
Mullah Abdul Rauf was killed in a US Air Force drone strike in the Helmand Province on 9 February 2015, one day short of his 34th birthday. It was said that the car he was travelling in was filled with ammunition and exploded. Rauf, his brother-in-law, and four Pakistani militants were said to have been killed.
