= Shamsuddin Pahlawan =

Afghan politician

Maulvi Shamsuddin Pahlawan شمس الدین پهلوان

Deputy Minister of Agriculture, Irrigation and Livestock
- Incumbent
- Assumed office 4 October 2021 (Note: Acting: 4 October 2021 – 15 August 2025) Serving with Sadar Azam; Attaullah Omari
- Prime Minister: Mohammad Hassan Akhund
- Minister: Abdul Rahman Rashid
- Supreme Leader: Hibatullah Akhundzada

Governor of Wardak Province
- In office 1996–2001
- Supreme Leader: Mohammed Omar

Personal details
- Born: c. 1968 (age 57–58) Kishim District, Badakhshan Province, Afghanistan
- Occupation: Politician, Taliban member

Maulvi Shamsuddin Pahlawan (مولوي شمس الدین پهلوان) (born;c. 1968) is an Afghan Taliban politician. Shamsuddin is serving as acting Deputy Minister of Agriculture, Irrigation and Livestock since 4 October 2021. He has also served as Governor of Maidan Wardak Province under Islamic Emirate of Afghanistan (1996–2001).
