= Leadership Council of Afghanistan =

Advisory council to the Supreme Leader of Afghanistan

Leadership Council رهبری شُورَىٰ شوری رهبری Rahbarī Shūrā
- Flag of the Islamic Emirate of Afghanistan

Type
- Type: Unicameral
- Term limits: None

History
- Founded: 15 August 2021 (current form); 4 April 1996 (originally)
- Preceded by: National Assembly

Leadership
- Supreme Leader: Hibatullah Akhundzada since 15 August 2021; In exile from 25 May 2016
- First Deputy: Sirajuddin Haqqani since 15 August 2021; In exile from 25 May 2016
- Second Deputy: Mullah Yaqoob since 15 August 2021; In exile from 25 May 2016
- Third Deputy: Abdul Ghani Baradar since 15 August 2021; In exile from 24 January 2019

Structure
- Seats: Approximately 30
- Political groups: Diplomatic Leadership: Taliban activities in Qatar
- Committees: Commissions
- Length of term: No fixed term
- Authority: 1998 dastur
- Composition method: Appointment by the supreme leader

Meeting place
- Qandahar

The Leadership Council of the Islamic Emirate of Afghanistan (Note: Also translated as the Supreme CouncilDari: شورای رهبری, romanized: Shūrā-i Rahbarī; Pashto: رهبری شُورَىٰ, romanized: Rahbarī Shūrā, also referred to as the Inner Shura),) is an advisory council to the supreme leader of Afghanistan and a central Taliban leadership body that has been maintained continuously since the movement formed its first government in 1996. It is empowered to appoint the supreme leader in the event of a vacancy. The supreme leader has ultimate authority and may override or circumvent the council at any time, convening it as often as he desires. It is one of many support organizations that surround the supreme leader in Kandahar, which together with the supreme leader are called the Leadership of the Islamic Emirate. The way it has been used has varied over time with changing circumstances. It played a key role in directing the Taliban insurgency from Quetta, Pakistan, which led to it being informally referred to as the Quetta Shura at the time.

During the Taliban insurgency, a consensus-based decision model was used among members of the Quetta Shura. After the 2021 return to power of the Taliban, Supreme Leader Hibatullah Akhundzada centralized power and began to communicate mostly through his three deputies. In March 2023, Oxford Analytica reported that he had not convened the Leadership Council for several months, instead consulting the local Kandahar provincial council of clerics for advice.

== Powers and duties ==
The council is the supreme governing body of the Taliban and the government of the Islamic Emirate of Afghanistan. It functions under a consensus decision-making model, and is chaired by the supreme leader. The Leadership Council appoints the supreme leader in the event of a vacancy. Under the first supreme leader, Mullah Omar, the role of the council was purely advisory, but an agreement to rule by consensus was formed upon the contentious appointment of Akhtar Mansour as the second supreme leader. However, the supreme leader may still override or circumvent the council at any time—the consensus model is merely a convention.

== Current shura (2021–present) ==
There are approximately 30 members. The following bodies make up the Leadership Council:

- Border Commission
- Commission for Agriculture, Livestock, Ushr and Zakat
- Commission for Cultural Affairs
- Commission for Financial Affairs
- Commission for Preaching and Guidance, Recruitment and Propagation of Virtue and the Prevention of Vice
- Commission for Prevention of Civilian Casualties and Complaints
- Commission for Prisoners' Affairs
- Commission for Training, Learning and Higher Education
- Commission of Military Affairs
- Department for the Affairs of Needy, Orphans and Disabled
- Department of Power Distribution
- Economic Commission
- Guidance and Invitation Commission
- Health Commission
- Institutional Commission
- Intelligence Commission
- Leadership Office
- Mining Commission
- Political Office (formerly Commission for Political Affairs)

Current membership
Name	Portfolio	Position(s) held in interim government
Hibatullah Akhundzada	Supreme Leader	
Hasan Akhund	Member of the Leadership Council	Prime Minister (2021–present)
Sirajuddin Haqqani	First Deputy Leader	Interior Minister
Mullah Yaqoob	Second Deputy Leader; Head of the Commission for Military Affairs	Defense Minister
Abdul Ghani Baradar	Third Deputy Leader; Head of the Economic Commission	First Deputy Prime Minister
Abdul Salam Hanafi	Member of the Leadership Council; Former Deputy Head of the Political Office	Second Deputy Prime Minister
Abdul Kabir	Head of the Commission for Preaching and Guidance, Recruitment and Propagation of Virtue and the Prevention of Vice	Third Deputy Prime Minister (2021–2025); Prime Minister pro tempore (May–July 2023)
Abdul Hakim Haqqani	Chief Justice	Justice Minister
Amir Khan Muttaqi	Head of the Leadership Office; Former Head of the Commission for Cultural Affairs	Foreign Minister
Abdul Manan Omari	Member of the Leadership Council; Former Head of the Commission for Preaching and Guidance, Recruitment and Propagation of Virtue and the Prevention of Vice; Former Head of the Commission for Prevention of Civilian Casualties and Complaints	Public Works Minister
Noor Mohammad Saqib	Member of the Leadership Council; Former Head of the Commission for Preaching and Guidance, Recruitment and Propagation of Virtue and the Prevention of Vice	Hajj and Religious Affairs Minister
Din Mohammad Hanif	Head of the Central Asia Department of the Political Office	Economy Minister
Abdul Latif Mansour	Member of the Leadership Council; Former Head of the Commission for Agriculture, Livestock, Ushr, and Zakat	Energy and Water Minister
Noorullah Noori	Member of the Leadership Council; Former member of the Political Office	Borders and Tribal Affairs Minister
Gul Agha Ishakzai	Former Head of the Commission for Financial Affairs	Finance Minister
Abdul Haq Wasiq	Member of the Leadership Council	Director of Intelligence
Sher Mohammad Abbas Stanikzai	Member of the Leadership Council; Deputy Head of the Political Office	Deputy Foreign Minister
Ibrahim Sadr	Member of the Leadership Council	Interior Minister (2021); Deputy Interior Minister (2021–present)
Abdul Qayyum Zakir	Member of the Leadership Council	Defense Minister (2021); Deputy Defense Minister (2021–present)
Mohammad Fazl	Member of the Leadership Council; Member of the Political Office	Deputy Defense Minister (2021)
Qasim Rasikh	Member of the Leadership Council; Former Head of the Guidance and Invitation Commission	First Deputy Chief Justice of the Supreme Court
Mullah Shirin Akhund	Member of the Leadership Council; Former Deputy Head of the Commission for Military Affairs for the Western Zone; Former Deputy Head of the Commission of Military Affairs for the Northeastern Zone	Governor of Kabul (2021)
Taj Mir Jawad	Member of the Leadership Council	Deputy Director of Intelligence
Muhammad Zahid Ahmadzai	Member of the Leadership Council	former First Secretary to Taliban Embassy of Pakistan from 1996 to 2001
Sayyid Abdul Rahman	Member of the Leadership Council	–
Sheikh Sharif	Member of the Leadership Council	–
Faizullah Noorzai Akhtar Mohammed Mira Khan	Member of the Leadership Council	–
Hafiz Abdul Majeed	Member of the Leadership Council	–

== Quetta Shura (2002–2020) ==
After the United States invasion of Afghanistan in 2001 and the end of the Taliban government, ten men who had held positions in the government formed a Council of Leaders (Rahbari Shura) in May 2002. They consisted of eight veteran high ranking (i.e. elite) commanders originally from the southern area of Afghanistan, another hailing from Paktika, and another from Paktia. The Shura was subsequently increased in number, during March 2003, to 33 individuals. During October 2006, the Consultative Council (majlis al-shura) was formed, comprising a number of advisors to 13 core members.

=== Directing the insurgency in Afghanistan ===
According to retired General of the United States Army Stanley A. McChrystal, the Quetta Shura was directing the Afghani Taliban insurgency. In a report to President Obama in 2009, he stated that it posed the greatest threat to his troops. He said, "Afghanistan's insurgency is clearly supported from Pakistan. The Quetta Shura conducts a formal campaign review each winter, after which Omar announces his guidance and intent for the following year." Americans wanted to extend the drone strikes into Balochistan.

In September 2009 US ambassador to Pakistan Anne W. Patterson said, "In the past, we focussed on Al-Qaeda because they were a threat to us. The Quetta Shura mattered less to us because we had no troops in the region, now our troops are there on the other side of the border, and the Quetta Shura is high on Washington's list."

=== Funding from Persian Gulf region ===
Taliban leaders raised money from wealthy donors from Arab states around the Persian gulf and from direct operations in Southern Afghanistan. According to Lieutenant General David Barno, the retired former commander of American forces in Afghanistan "The Quetta Shura is extremely important, they are the intellectual and ideological underpinnings of the Taliban insurgency."

=== Support from Pakistani intelligence ===
American officials believed that the Quetta Shura gets support from parts of Pakistan's Inter-Services Intelligence (ISI), as some of its senior officials believe that leaders such as Mullah Omar would have been valuable assets if the Taliban were to regain power after a withdrawal of U.S. forces from Afghanistan. According to Abdul Rahim Mandokhel, a Pakistani senator from Zhob in northern Balochistan. "The whole war in Afghanistan is being launched from here," he said. He accused Pakistan's intelligence agencies of carrying out a "double" policy. "One thing is clear: the area is being used for cross-border offences," he said.

On 13 June 2010, a report by the London School of Economics (LSE) claimed to provide the most concrete evidence yet that the ISI is providing funding, training and sanctuary to the Taliban insurgency on a scale much larger than previously thought. The report's author Matt Waldman spoke to nine Taliban field commanders in Afghanistan and concluded that Pakistan's relationship with the insurgents ran far deeper than previously realized. Some of those interviewed suggested that the organization even attended meetings of the Taliban's supreme council, the Quetta Shura. A spokesman for the Pakistani military dismissed the report, describing it as "malicious".

=== Pakistani relationship ===
==== Statement ====
American and western officials had long complained that Pakistan had ignored the presence of senior Taliban leadership in Quetta and done little to address this situation. Pakistani authorities had denied the existence of such an organization in Pakistan. However, statements by US officials had led to fears that US would launch drone strikes on Quetta. Jehan Zeb Jamaldini, senior vice president of Balochistan National Party was quoted as saying that Omar and his 2nd and 3rd tier leadership were around Quetta and would be targeted by the US. On 30 July 2021 the former Prime Minister of Pakistan Imran Khan rejected the allegations of the Quetta Shura being in Pakistan. He said these are just baseless allegations by Pakistan's enemies. He added that Pakistan is not spokesperson for Taliban and if anyone has any queries, then they can ask the Taliban directly.

==== Acknowledgement ====
In December 2009 Pakistani government for the first time acknowledged the existence of Quetta Shura. The Defence minister of Pakistan, Ahmad Mukhtar acknowledged the presence of Quetta Shura but stated that security forces had damaged it to such an extent that it no longer posed a threat.

On 23 November 2012, when Pakistan released nine senior Taliban leaders, commentator Ali K. Chishti described a statement from the Pakistani government as its first acknowledgment of the existence of the Quetta Shura.

=== Arrests ===
In February 2010, in a possible change in Pakistani policy, several members of the Quetta Shura were detained at various locations in Pakistan. Top Taliban leader Abdul Ghani Baradar, who ran the Shura, was captured in Karachi in a joint operation by Inter-Services Intelligence and Central Intelligence Agency. He had reportedly gone to Karachi to meet other Shura leaders who had moved to this city in recent months. A few days later two more members of the Quetta Shura, Abdul Kabir and Mohammed Yunis, the Taliban’s shadow governor of Zabul Province, were detained by Pakistani intelligence. They were to be handed over to Kabul if they had committed crimes in Pakistan.

Analysts were split on the question of why Pakistan moved against these key leaders. Many said that Pakistan had decided it wanted to control any negotiations between the Taliban and the Afghan government. However, according to The News International, the Pakistani establishment, in a major policy shift, had decided not to support the Shura and had arrested 9 of the 18 key members within a period of 2 weeks. The policy shift was made after pressure from the US as well as a request from the Saudi Royal family

=== Coalition efforts at negotiations ===
In November 2009, it was reported that the British were pushing for talks between the Afghan government and the Shura. 'Major General Richard Barrons said negotiations with the senior echelons of the Afghan Taliban leadership council – the Quetta shura – were being looked at, alongside the reintegration of insurgency fighters into civilian life. In his first interview since arriving in Afghanistan to begin talks with "moderate" Taliban fighters, Barrons said British officials were backing extensive talks between Karzai's government and the Quetta shura, which is led by Omar and is responsible for directing much of the fighting against British forces in Helmand province.'

Early January 2010, some commanders from the Quetta Shura held secret exploratory talks with Kai Eide to discuss peace terms, as emerged at the end of that month during the International Conference on Afghanistan in London. The Shura had sought a meeting with the United Nations envoy, which took place in Dubai on 8 January 2010. This was the first such meeting between the UN and alleged senior members of the Taliban, suggesting that peace talks had revived since exploratory contacts between emissaries of the Kabul government and the Taliban in Saudi Arabia in 2009 broke down. It was not clear how significant a faction had shown up in Dubai or how serious they were. A western official confirmed that there were indications of splits in the Taliban over the prospect of a settlement. Supporters of former presidential candidate Abdullah Abdullah predicted that negotiations could fail because the Karzai government was too weak, and other critics warned that trying to buy off insurgents created a "moral hazard" of rewarding combatants who had killed Western troops and local civilians. Taliban sources denied that there had been such a meeting and dismissed them as baseless rumors.

=== Leaders ===
The Taliban's Quetta Shura is the main leadership among Afghanistan's Taliban.

According to The News International, Pakistani security officials had previously regarded Afghanistan's Taliban, the Quetta Shura, and Tehrik-i-Taliban Pakistan as three separate entities. They reported that Pakistani security officials had changed their policy in early 2010, and had decided to treat all three organizations as one organization, and to crack down on the Quetta Shura. The reported nine of its eighteen leaders were captured in late February and early March 2010.

In August 2019, some Taliban leaders, including Hafiz Ahmadullah, the brother of Taliban emir Hibatullah Akhunzada, were killed in a bomb blast at the Khair Ul Madarais mosque, which had served as the main meeting place of the Taliban, on the outskirts of Quetta.

On 29 May 2020, it was reported that Omar's son Yaqoob was now acting as leader of the Taliban after numerous Quetta Shura members where infected with COVID-19. It was previously confirmed on 7 May 2020 that Yaqoob had become head of the Taliban military commission, making him the insurgents' military chief. Among those infected in the Quetta Shura, which continued to hold in-person meetings, were Hibatullah and Sirajuddin Haqqani.

=== Quetta Shura members ===
Name	Notes
Mohammed Omar	Founder and Supreme Commander of the Taliban; Now known to have not been in Quetta; Death from illness in Afghanistan in 2013 not made public until late July 2015 by the Afghan government and then Taliban officials.
Akhtar Mohammad Mansoor	Former Minister for Aviation during the Islamic Emirate of Afghanistan; Believed to have been the "Shadow Governor" for Kandahar Province; Succeeded Omar as the Supreme Leader of the Taliban; Confirmed dead in late May 2016.
Hibatullah Akhundzada	Chief Justice of the Sharia courts of the Islamic Emirate of Afghanistan.; Current Supreme Leader of the Taliban
Sirajuddin Haqqani	Current joint Deputy Leader of the Taliban
Moammad Hassan Akhund	Reported to have been "a former foreign minister in the Taliban regime".; Reported captured in late February 2010.; Current Prime Minister of the Taliban Government
Rahmatullah Kakazada	Former Consul General During the Taliban's rule in the 1990s, in Karachi, Pakistan.; After 2001, he played a significant role as a key Taliban member in Ghazni province, responsible for intelligence collection, and, as of 2007, was reportedly responsible for appointing governors in Ghazni province.; A key member of the Haqqani Network; Current Director General of Public Relations for the Interior Ministry of Afghanistan and the Haqqani Network.
Abdul Ghani Baradar	Reported captured on 11 February 2010.; Reported to have reorganized the Afghan Taliban's military wing.; Current First Deputy Prime Minister of the Taliban Government
Abdul Kabir	Reported to be the Taliban's "shadow governor of Nangarhar province".; Reported captured in February 2010 in Nowshera.; Current Third Deputy Prime Minister of the Taliban Government
Amir Khan Muttaqi	Reported to be a "former minister in Taliban regime".; Current Acting Foreign Minister of the Taliban Government
Abdul Qayyum Zakir	Previously held in Guantanamo under the name Abdullah Ghulam Rasoul.; Reported captured in late February 2010.; Reported to remain at large, and be a candidate to replace Abdul Ghani Baradar.
Abdul Rauf	Reported captured in late February 2010.; Reported to have been a "former chief operational commander of the Taliban in northeastern Afghanistan".; Also reported to be a former Guantanamo captive who was just 20 years old when initially captured.
Mir Muhammad	Reported to be the Taliban's "shadow governor of Baghlan province".; Reported captured on 26 January 2010 in Faisalabad.
Abdul Salam	Reported to be the Taliban's "shadow governor of Kunduz province".; Reported captured in late January 2010.
Ahmad Jan Akhundzada	Reported to have been a "former governor of Zabul province".; Reported captured in late February 2010.
Muhammad Younis	Reported to be an explosives expert who had served as a Police chief in Kabul during the Taliban rule.; Reported captured in late February 2010.
Mohammad Hasan Rahmani	Former governor of Kandahar province.; Died of cancer on February 7, 2016
Hafiz Abdul Majeed	Reported to be the "former Chief of the Afghan Intelligence" and the "surge commander of the Taliban in southern Afghanistan".
Agha Jan Mutasim	Reported to be "the Taliban’s head of political affairs".
Abdul Jalil	Reported to be the "head of the Taliban’s shadowy interior ministry".
Abdul Latif Mansoor	Reported to be "the commander of the Mansoor Network in Paktika and Khost".
Abdur Razaq Akhundzada	Reported to be the former corps commander for northern Afghanistan.
Abdullah Mutmain	Reported to be "a former minister during the Taliban regime who currently looks after the financial affairs of the extremist militia".
Agha Jan Motasim	Former Taliban Finance Minister.; Formerly chair of the political committee, stripped of this position in 2009 following rumors of corruption—may have been forced from the Shura at this time.

== Inner Shura (1996–2001) ==
According to U.S. intelligence, the "Inner Shura" of the First Islamic Emirate of Afghanistan was originally a collective leadership body, but gradually lost power as over the course of the Taliban's first year in government as Mullah Omar developed a cult of personality. It had 23 members. Mohammad Ghous was reportedly a member. It was based in Kandahar. Also known as the Supreme Council, it was chaired by Omar.

== See also ==
- War in Afghanistan (2001–2021)
- International Security Assistance Force
- Haqqani network
- Consultative Assembly of Saudi Arabia
- Islamic Consultative Assembly of Iran
- Consultative Assembly of Qatar
