= Nasir Ahmad Durrani =

Afghanistan politician

Nasir Ahmad Durrani is an Afghan politician who is also the former Minister of Agriculture, Irrigation & Livestock. He was appointed as the acting minister of Agriculture by the President in September 2017, he assumed the position officially when he received a vote of confidence from the Afghan Parliament in December 2017. Nasir Ahmad Durrani has held various government positions since 2010.

Durrani was appointed as the Deputy Minister of Mines and Petroleum in 2010 by Hamid Karzai. He served at the Ministry of Mines & Petroleum until the end of Karzai's second term. After the Afghan presidential elections in 2014, President Ashraf Ghani appointed Nasir Ahmad Durrani as the Minister of Rural Rehabilitation and Development.
