= Sadar Azam =

Maulvi Sadar Azam صدر اعظم

Deputy Minister of Agriculture, Irrigation and Livestock
- Incumbent
- Assumed office 22 September 2021 (Note: Acting: 22 September 2021 – 15 August 2025) Serving with Shamsuddin Pahlawan; Attaullah Omari
- Prime Minister: Mohammad Hassan Akhund
- Minister: Abdul Rahman Rashid
- Supreme Leader: Hibatullah Akhundzada

Personal details
- Occupation: Politician, Islamic scholar, Taliban member

Maulvi Sadar Azam or Sadr Azam (Pashto: مولوي صدر اعظم) is an Afghan Taliban politician and Islamic scholar who is serving as acting Deputy Minister of Agriculture and Livestock since 22 September 2021 alongside Attaullah Omari and Shamsuddin Pahlawan. He belongs to Paktia.

In November 2021 Sadar Azam met with officials of the Turkish Humanitarian Aid Foundation INSANI YARDIM VAKFI (IHH) which launched a campaign under the slogan "Don't leave me alone" and has donated 100 tons of improved wheat seeds to Afghanistan.
