= Qari Salahuddin Ayubi =

Afghan Taliban politician and soldier

Qari Salahuddin Ayubi قاری صلاح الدین ایوبی

Deputy Minister of Rural Rehabilitation and Development
- Incumbent
- Assumed office 4 March 2022 (Note: Acting: 4 March 2022 – 15 August 2025)
- Prime Minister: Mohammad Hassan Akhund
- Minister: Mohammad Younus Akhundzada
- Supreme Leader: Hibatullah Akhundzada

Personal details
- Born: Faryab
- Citizenship: Afghanistan
- Party: Taliban
- Occupation: Politician, military commander, Taliban member
- Ethnicity: Uzbek

Qari Salahuddin Ayubi (Dari: قاری صلاح الدین ایوبی, romanized: Qārī Ṣalāḥuddīn Ayūbī) is an Afghan politician and soldier who is serving as Deputy Minister of Planning and Policy of the Ministry of Rural Rehabilitation and Development since 4 March 2022.
