= Abdul Rahman Halim =

Afghan politician

Maulvi Abdul Rahman Halim عبدالرحمان حلیم

Deputy Minister of Rural Rehabilitation and Development
- Incumbent
- Assumed office 23 November 2021 (Note: Acting: 23 November 2021 – 15 August 2025)
- Prime Minister: Mohammad Hassan Akhund
- Minister: Mohammad Younus Akhundzada
- Supreme Leader: Hibatullah Akhundzada

Personal details
- Party: Taliban
- Profession: Politician

Maulvi Abdul Rahman Halim (Pashto: مولوي عبدالرحمن حلیم) is an Afghan Taliban politician who is serving as Deputy Minister of Rural Rehabilitation and Development since 23 November 2021.
