= Committee for the Promotion of Virtue and the Prevention of Vice =

Committee for the Promotion of Virtue and the Prevention of Vice may refer to:

- Committee for the Propagation of Virtue and the Prevention of Vice (Gaza Strip)
- Committee for the Promotion of Virtue and the Prevention of Vice (Saudi Arabia)
- Ministry for the Propagation of Virtue and the Prevention of Vice (Afghanistan)

== See also ==
- Enjoining good and forbidding wrong
- Islamic religious police
