= Al-Mouwasat Welfare Organization =

Al-Mouwasat Welfare Organization (Afghanistan)
- Founded: Early 2012
- Founder: Anwar ul Haq (Baheer Mujahid)
- Purpose: Emergency Services, Education, Healthcare
- Location: Jalalabad, Afghanistan
- Region served: Social Welfare, Humanitarianism
- Method: Donations
- Endowment: $5000
- Website: www.al-mouwasat.com

Al-Mouwasat Welfare Organization (AMWO) Pashto دالمواسات خیریه ټولنه is a Non-governmental organization in Afghanistan. Keeping in view the needs of Afghan people, some respected friends suggested to found an organization to help and fulfill the needs of Afghan nation in health and education sectors on priority basis. Al-Mouwasat was founded in January 2012 by Anwar ul Haq Mujahid. It is a non-profitable, charitable, independent and non-governmental organization registered with Ministry of Economy (Afghanistan), and dedicated to reduce human suffering. It has nothing to do with any regional, ethnic or political organization of Afghanistan.

== Programs Or Services ==
Al-Mouwasat is sorting out among the problems which are serious and then offers solution to it by proper allocation of fund. At the moment, AMWO is working in following fields:

- Health
- Education
- Social Awareness
- Poverty Alleviation
- Emergency Services
- Relief Works

== Mission ==
AMWO states that its mission is to assist the people of Afghanistan by addressing shortages in basic daily necessities and essential services.

== Philosophy ==
AMWO is Afghan analysis for Afghan problems through Afghan solutions by the help of community stake holders. AMWO want to be the part of solutions to our national problems through welfare setup.

== Major Project ==
AMWO has launched the first ever free ambulance service in Afghanistan in November 2012, initially the service was only available in Nangarhar province, but now its available for more than five provinces with plans to widen to the entirety of the country. This is the first of its kind, offering emergency services for free. This service has the potential to help many Afghans considering there is no other free emergency ambulance service in Afghanistan.

== Upcoming Project ==
After success of free ambulance service, AMWO decided to work on a Thalassemia center in order to facilitate the Thalassemia patients within the country with modern equipment and best personnel. According to reports, Afghanistan is among the Thalassemia affected countries, due to lack of basic health infrastructure patient are going to side by countries for treatment of Thalassemia.

== Sources ==
AMWO has appointed their representatives in different countries e.g. United States of America, United Kingdom, Norway, France, Kingdom of Saudi Arabia and United Arab Emirates. These representatives are also their regional heads who use different approaches for fund-raising and spreading awareness about AMWO operations.
