= Bette Dam =

Bette Dam is an investigative journalist professor at Sciences Po and author of Looking for the Enemy the unknown story of the Taliban, which describes the life of the most unknown leader of the world, mullah Omar.

== Professional career ==
Dam is notable for writing more complex, and diverse stories on terrorism. In 2009, she published the unknown story of the then Afghan President Hamid Karzai, and how he came to power immediately after 09/11. As one of the first journalists, Dam shows that there were strong signs that the so-called war on terrorism in Afghanistan could have been over in December 2001, with a surrender-offer of the Taliban. Dam also describes how the United States government, under the leadership of George Bush at that time, was ‘too emotional’ to accept this, and started the military intervention instead.

In Looking for the Enemy, Dam discloses for the first time the long unknown hiding place of mullah Omar, the leader of the Taliban. Like Osama bin Laden who lived next to a Pakistan Military Academy, mullah Omar lived not far from an American Forward Operating Base in Southern Afghanistan (Zabul), she claims. The news attracted attention. There were compliments, and at the same time disbelief. The Afghan government who had claimed mullah Omar to be in Pakistan, wrote that Dam was ‘delusional’. General David Petreaus responded in The Wall Street Journal, saying that he still believed mullah Omar had been hiding in Pakistan. Yet, Dam her work has not been proven wrong. The Guardian stated that Dam her work ‘is something the CIA was not able to do’. Foreign Affairs reviewed her work and stated that ‘the West still doesn't understand the Taliban’.

Since 2017, Dam has been a professor at Sciences Po, in Paris. Her teaching is about detecting Western biases in global coverage, and how to prevent this. She also lectured at several universities and for governments. In 2020 she lectured at Oxford University at All Souls College.

Dam has appeared in media such as the BBC,CNN and The Guardian. She was nominated the best investigative journalist of the year in 2020.

Her first book was nominated for the Bob den Uyl Award and for the Dick Scherpenzeel award.

As an Author

- A Man and a Motorcycle: How Hamid Karzai Came to Power (2014)
- The Secret Life of Mullah Omar (2019)
- Looking for the Enemy: Mullah Omar and the Unknown Taliban (2021)

== Early life and education ==
From 2002 to 2005, Dam studied political science with a specialization in International Relations at the University of Amsterdam.

In 2019, Dam started her PhD at the University of Brussels. Dam writes an auto-ethnographic study about her journalistic experiences in Afghanistan and compares it to the journalistic productions of legacy media such as the New York Times and Associated Press on Afghanistan.
