= Abdul Latif Nazari =

Deputy Minister of Economy of the Islamic Emirate of Afghanistan

Abdul Latif Nazari عبدالطیف نظری
- Education: Ph.D. in political science from the University of Tehran
- Occupation: Deputy Minister of Economy
- Employer: Islamic Emirate of Afghanistan

Abdul Latif Nazari (Dari: عبدالطیف نظری) who is serving as Deputy Minister of Economy of the Islamic Emirate of Afghanistan since 26 December 2021.

He belongs to the Hazara ethnicity. He holds a Ph.D. in political science from University of Tehran. He is the founder of Gharjistan University, located in Pul-e-Sorkh, Kabul.
