= Michael Semple =

Irish expert on Afghanistan and Pakistan

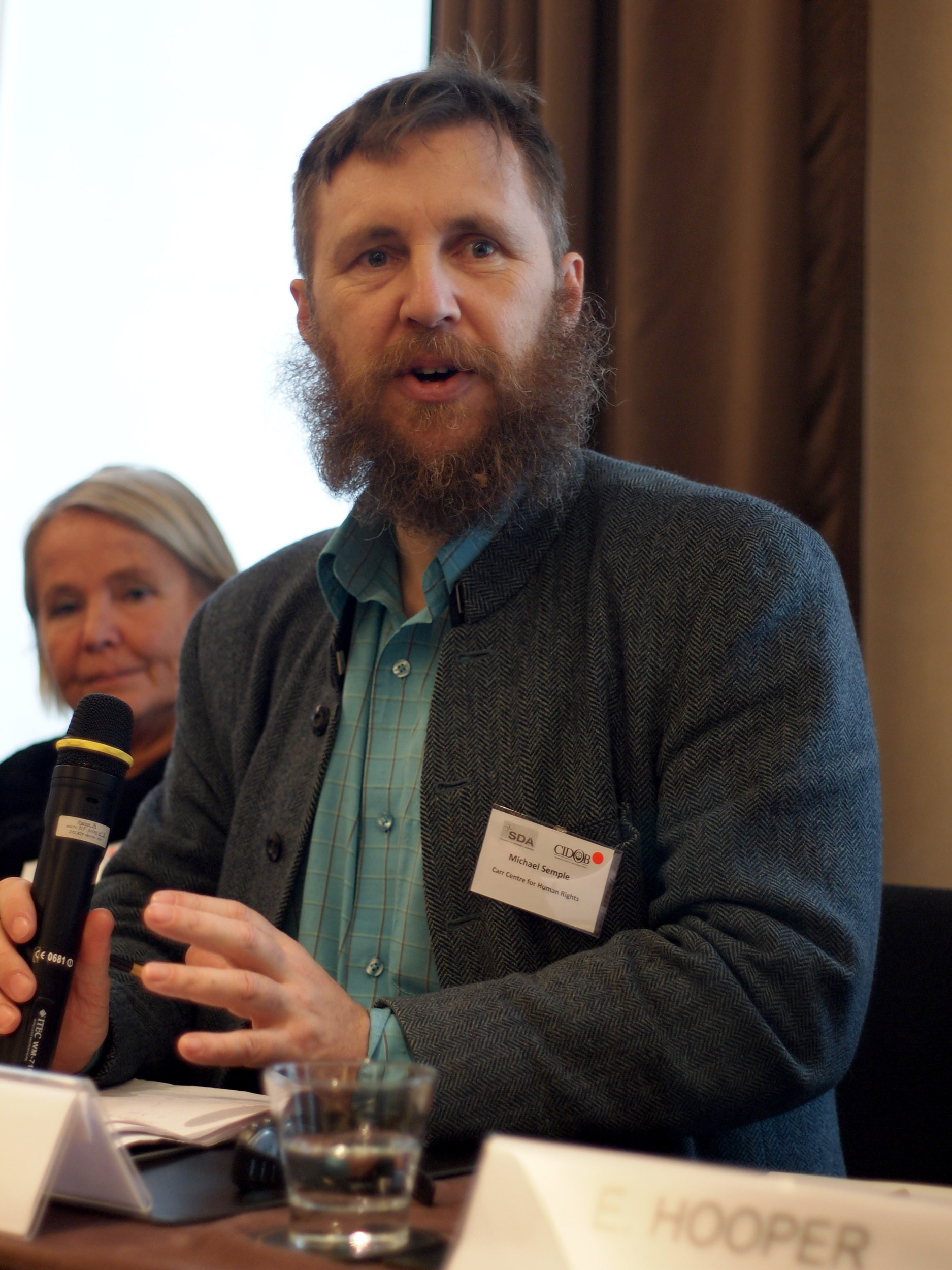
- Michael Semple in December 2012
- Occupations: Afghanistan and Pakistan expert
- Known for: Expertise on Afghanistan and Pakistan

Michael Semple is an Irish expert on Afghanistan and Pakistan. From 2004 to 2007, he served as deputy to the European Union special representative for Afghanistan until being expelled by the Afghan government due to engaging in "unauthorised activities". Semple is a fluent Dari speaker, and has lived in Afghanistan and Pakistan for over 25 years. He held a fellowship with the Carr Center for Human Rights Policy at the John F. Kennedy School of Government at Harvard University

The BBC described him as "one of the West's most respected experts on Afghanistan".
