= Mohammad Asif Rahimi =

Afghan politician

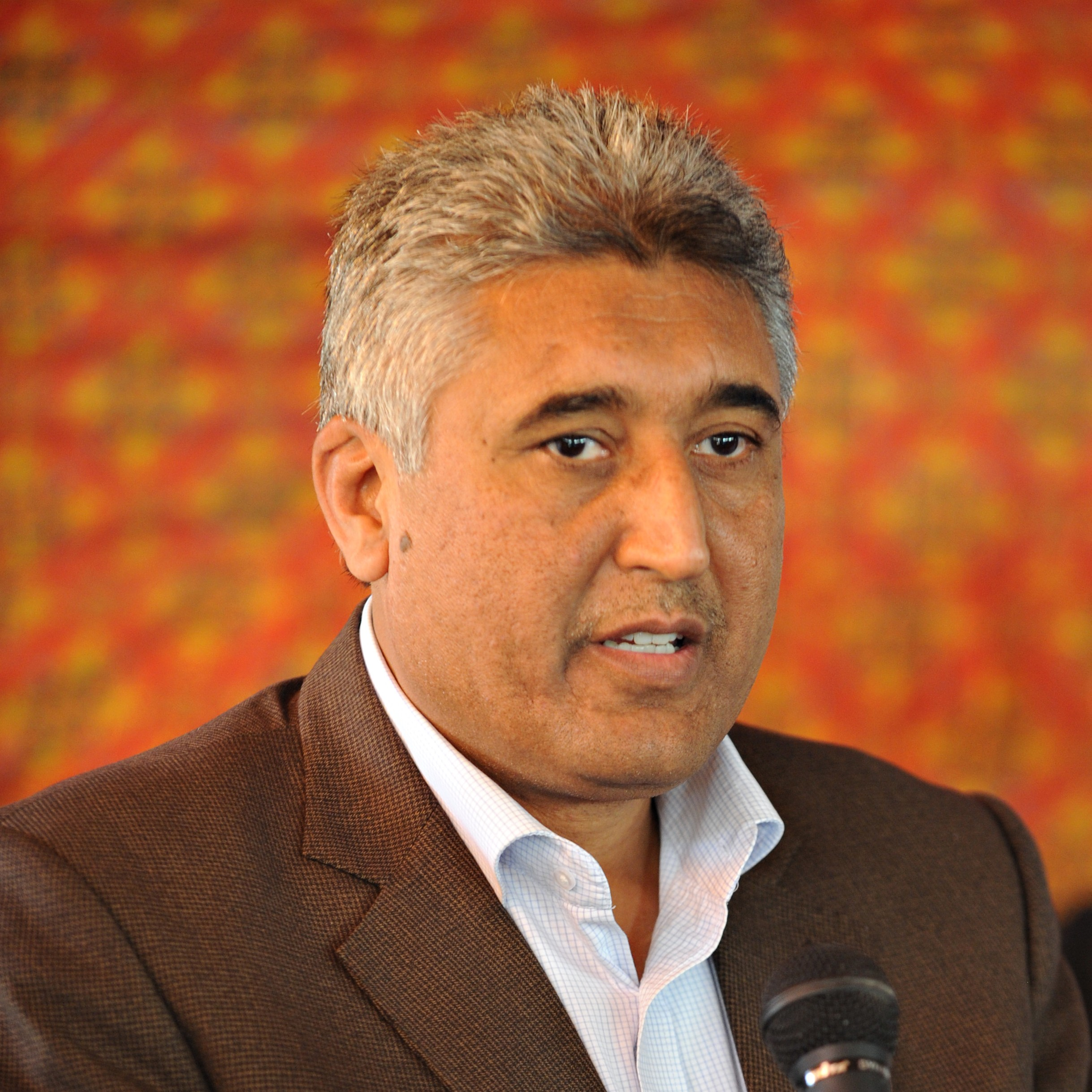
- Rahimi in April 2011

Minister of Agriculture of Afghanistan
- In office 11 October 2008 – 2014
- President: Hamid Karzai
- Preceded by: Obaidullah Rameen
- Succeeded by: Asadullah Zameer

Governor of Herat
- In office 27 April 2015 – 11 December 2018
- Preceded by: Asiluddin Jami (acting)
- Succeeded by: Abdul Quayom Rahimi

Personal details
- Born: 1959 (age 66–67) Paghman District, Kabul Province, Kingdom of Afghanistan

Mohammad Asif Rahimi (born 1959) is an Afghan politician serving as ambassador to the Netherlands. He was previously the governor of Herat Province and Minister of Agriculture. An ethnic Tajik, he was raised in Kabul, and obtained a bachelor's degree from Kabul University in 1981 before completing post-graduate studies in Management of Development Programs in 1989 at Omaha University in Nebraska, United States. Rahimi moved to Canada in 2001, and returned to Afghanistan in 2005, where he joined the Ministry of Rural Rehabilitation and Development, spearheading rural development and infrastructure regeneration. He was appointed to his current posting in October 2008 and was confirmed by the National Assembly of Afghanistan. Part of his Ministry's efforts have been focused on reducing opium production in Afghanistan, which is seen as critical to Afghanistan's development.

Asia Times reported that on November 17, 2009, two employees of the Ministry of Agriculture had the home they shared with their extended family raided by American special forces. Asia Times reported that the surviving cousin Majibullah Qarar had reported the capture and disappearance of the other ministry employee Habib-ur-Rahman, and the shooting of two other cousins, Hamidullah and Azim. A denunciation of Habib-ur-Rahman had triggered the raid. He was a computer expert who had traveled to Kuwait to study Computer Science, and his denunciators claimed he had been influenced by al Qaeda, while there. Asia Times reported that the Minister of Agriculture had personally appealed to the Americans for the release of his employee.

Political offices
| Preceded by Obaidullah Rameen | Minister of Agriculture of Afghanistan; October 11, 2008–2014 | Succeeded by Asadullah Zameer |
