= Rahimullah Yusufzai =

Pakistani journalist (1954–2021)

- رحیم اللہ یوسُفزئی
- Born: September 10, 1954; Mardan District, Khyber Pakhtunkhwa, Pakistan
- Died: September 9, 2021 (aged 66)
- Education: D. J. Sindh Government Science College; University of Karachi
- Occupation: journalist
- Writing career
- Language: Pashto, Urdu, English
- Notable works: interviewed Osama bin Laden and Mullah Omar
- Notable awards: Tamgha-e-Imtiaz (Medal of Excellence) by the President of Pakistan (2005); Sitara-i-Imtiaz (Star of Excellence) by the President of Pakistan (2010)

Rahimullah Yusufzai (رحیم اللہ یوسُفزئی) (10 September 1954 – 9 September 2021) was a Pakistani journalist, political and security analyst, best known for having interviewed Osama bin Laden, and Afghan Taliban leader Mullah Omar.

He was also a war correspondent.

== Early life and education ==
Yusufzai was born on 10 September 1954 in Pakistan in Shamozai village of Mardan District in Khyber Pakhtunkhwa. He received his early education at his village primary school and then in public schools in Peshawar and Jhelum. Rahimullah also studied at the D.J. Sindh College and the University of Karachi.

== Career ==
Yusufzai was among the first journalists to report on the Taliban and visited Kandahar, Afghanistan, in 1995. He was one of the few bona fide experts on Afghanistan, having reported on the country since the 1979 invasion of Afghanistan by the former Soviet Union. In 2016, he also frequently appeared on Geo News TV channel as a news analyst. He was the editor of the Jang Group's The News International at the Peshawar Bureau and was an op-ed writer for the monthly Newsline. Rahimullah is especially noted for holding the last interview with Osama bin Laden. He also served as a correspondent in Pakistan for Time magazine. Rahimullah was also a correspondent of BBC's Pashto and Urdu services in the Khyber Pakhtunkhwa province of Pakistan.

== Awards and recognition ==
Yusufzai was considered an authority on Afghan affairs and on the Federally Administered Tribal Areas (FATA) of Pakistan. Acknowledging his achievements in journalism, the government of Pakistan first awarded him the Tamgha-e-Imtiaz (Medal of Excellence) in 2005. Then he received the Sitara-i-Imtiaz Award (Star of Excellence) from the President of Pakistan for his achievements in the field of journalism on 23 March 2010.

== Death ==
Yusufzai died from cancer on 9 September 2021 after battling the disease for 15 months. Among his survivors are four sons and two daughters. His funeral prayer was offered in his hometown Inzargi, Katlang, Mardan District and he was laid to rest on 10 September 2021. Prime Minister Imran Khan, Chief of Army Staff General Qamar Javed Bajwa, Awami National Party leader Asfandyar Wali Khan, Qaumi Watan Party chief Aftab Ahmad Khan Sherpao, Federal Minister Chaudhry Fawad Hussain, Pakistan Federal Union of Journalists and others offered condolences upon his death.
