= Abdul Rahman Rashid =

Afghan Taliban politician

Maulvi Abdul Rahman Rashid عبد الرحمن راشد
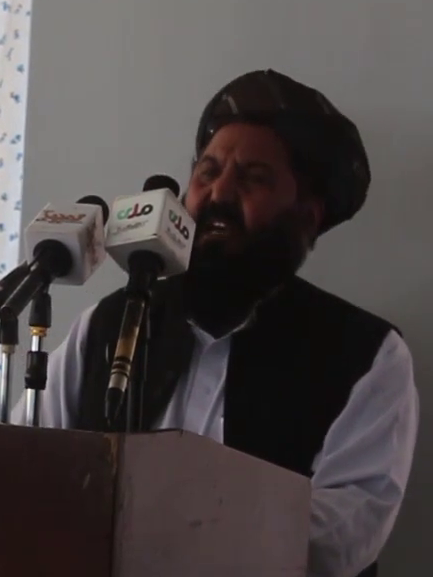
- Rashid in 2022

Minister of Agriculture, Irrigation, and Livestock
- Incumbent
- Assumed office 22 September 2021 (Note: Acting: 22 September 2021 – 15 August 2025)
- Prime Minister: Hasan Akhund
- Deputy: Sadar Azam; Attaullah Omari; Shamsuddin Pahlawan
- Leader: Hibatullah Akhundzada

Personal details
- Profession: Politician

Maulvi Abdul Rahman Rashid (مولوي عبد الرحمن راشد) is an Afghan Taliban politician. Rashid is serving as Minister of Agriculture, Irrigation and Livestock as of 22 September 2021.
