= Muhammad Zahid Ahmadzai =

Afghan politician and diplomat

Muhammad Zahid Ahmadzai محمد ذاهد احمدزی
- Occupations: Politician, diplomat, Taliban member

Muhammad Zahid Ahmadzai is a politician and diplomat from Afghanistan who is the member of Leadership Council of Afghanistan. He also served as Diplomat and First Secretary to Taliban Embassy of Pakistan from 1996 to 2001.
