= Ministry of Agriculture, Irrigation and Livestock =

Government ministry of Afghanistan

- Dari: وزارت زراعت، آبیاری و مالداری; Pashto: د کرنې، اوبولګولو او مالدارۍ وزارت
- Ministry flag

Department overview
- Jurisdiction: Government of Afghanistan
- Headquarters: Kabul; 34.521187°N 69.139437°E
- Minister responsible: Abdul Rahman Rashid
- Deputy Ministers responsible: Sadar Azam; Attaullah Omari; Shamsuddin Pahlawan
- Website: mail.gov.af

The Afghan Minister of Agriculture, Irrigation & Livestock (Dari: وزارت زراعت، آبیاری و مالداری, Pashto: د کرنې، اوبولګولو او مالدارۍ وزارت) is the Government of Afghanistan Cabinet officer responsible for managing Afghanistan's agriculture policy.

Among other matters, the Ministry oversees the work of the Helmand and Arghandab Valley Authority.

== Ministers ==
Date	Name	Notes
1996 – 2001	Abdul Latif Mansur	under Mohammed Omar
December 22, 2002– December 7, 2004	Sayed Hussein Anwari	*Appointed by Hamid Karzai, member of the ATA.
2004-October 11, 2008	Obaidullah Rameen	*Appointed by Hamid Karzai.
October 11, 2008 – 2014	Mohammad Asef Rahimi	*Appointed by Hamid Karzai
2015–September 2017	Assadullah Zameer	*Appointed by Ashraf Ghani.
September 2017–2021	Nasir Ahmad Durrani	*Appointed by Ashraf Ghani and Acting President .
September 2020	Dr. Anwar Haq Ahadi	*Appointed by Ashraf Ghani

1. Previous Ministers of Agriculture, Livestock, Food and Irrigation:

- Obaidullah Ramin (Baghlan),
- Mohamed Asif Rahimi (2008) and (20100102 - 20141208)
- acting Minister of Agriculture, Irrigation and Livestock Salim Khan Kunduzi (20141209)
- Asadullah Zamir (20150418)
- Nasir Ahmad Durani (20170923, 20171204 confirmed, 20200831)
- Anwar-ul Haq Ahadi nominated and acting (20200831) confirmed (20201130)
- Minister of Agriculture, Livestock and Irrigation acting (20210922)

Deputy Minister:

- Abdul Ghani Ghoryani (20100418, 20120409)
- Salim Kunduzi (20110316)
- Hamdullah Hamdard (20180509)
- Raz Mohammad Raz (2010, 20130906)
- Engr. Fahimullah Ziaee (20170501)
- Deputy minister of agriculture for administration and finance:
- Abdul Hadi Rafiee (20210208) his car was targeted by an magnetic IED
- Deputy Minister for Irrigation and natural Resources:
- Hashmatullah Ghafoori (20210208)
