= Mohammed Qalamuddin =

Afghan politician

Mohammed Qalamuddin (Arabic: محمد قلمُ الدين), an Afghan politician, served under the Taliban regime as deputy head of the Vice and Virtue Ministry. He also served as deputy minister of mosques and Hajj, and as head of the Afghan National Olympic Committee.
