= Obaidullah Rameen =

Afghan politician

Obaidullah Ramin (born 27 September 1952, in Baghlan Province) is a politician in Afghanistan and was appointed the country's Minister of Agriculture in December 2004. After his two term as the Minister of Agriculture, Obaidullah Ramin ran a successful campaign and is appointed a current Member of National Assembly. He is a member of Parliament representing the Baghlan Province.

Mohammad Asef Rahimi was appointed Minister on October 11, 2008.
