= Taizeni =

Village in Afghanistan

Taizeni is a small village in the southern part of Afghanistan in the Helmand province. The place was emphasized in the news after Taliban commander and Amir al-Mu'minin, Mullah Mohammed Omar died in the village (according to Taliban social media accounts). It is believed the commander lived for a while in the village before his death on April 23, 2013. Hashtags referring to Taizeni were employed on Twitter after Omar's death.
