= Agha Jan Motasim =

Mutasim Agha Jan آغا جان معتصم
- Other names: Mutasim Agha Jan
- Occupation: Taliban member
- Known for: Taliban Co Founder

Mutasim Agha Jan was a prominent member of the Taliban's leadership and a member of the Quetta Shura. During the Taliban's administration of Afghanistan he was the Minister of Finance. Following their ouster he was a member of the Quetta Shura. Prior to the war in Afghanistan Motasim was the chair of the Quetta Shura's political committee.

In August 2010 Motasim was targeted by assassins and nearly died after advocating the Taliban should negotiate participation in Afghanistan's mainstream political process. "My idea was I wanted a broad-based government, all political parties together and maybe some hard-liners among the Taliban in Afghanistan and in Pakistan didn't like to hear this and so they attacked me."

In May 2012 Motasim told the Associated Press he regretted the assassination of Arsala Rahmani, a former Taliban Deputy Minister who served under Afghanistan's President Hamid Karzai.

In 2012, Motasim blamed the breakdown of negotiations with the Taliban on the USA's apparent unwillingness or inability to honor assurances that it would release Taliban captives.

Motasim was followed by rumors of financial corruption, both as Finance Minister, while on the Quetta Shura—rumors that triggered his ouster in 2009.
