= Ahmad Jan (Taliban governor) =

- Died: 21 November 2013; Pakistan
- Other names: Ahmad Jan Akhundzada
- Occupations: Politician, Taliban fighter
- Known for: Taliban leader

Maulvi Ahmed Jan (died 21 November 2013) was a former Taliban official who eventually became the Haqqani Network's chief spiritual adviser. Hailing from Ghazni province of Afghanistan, Ahmad Jan had also served the Taliban government of Mullah Omar as federal minister for water and power, before being appointed the Governor of the Zabul Province in 2000. His name figured on the CIA's list of most wanted Taliban commanders after he was accused of masterminding a number of deadly suicide attacks in Afghanistan. According to the United Nations, in 2000, an individual known as Maulavi Ahmad Jan was the Taliban's Governor of Zabol Province. The United Nations listed him as an individual subject to the sanctions authorized by United Nations Security Council resolutions 1267 and 1333.

In March 2010, he was sanctioned by the United Nation for his ties to Al Qaeda. At the time, Jan was described as a chief financier and logistics official for the Haqqani Network and one of the leaders of the Taliban's Quetta Shura. He was captured in late February 2010. He was eventually released from prison and became the Haqqani Network's spiritual leader. Jan eventually became the chief deputy to network leader Sirajuddin Haqqani and had been responsible for organizing some of the network's most deadly attacks in Afghanistan. On 21 November 2013, Jan was killed in Pakistan after missiles from a U.S. predator drone struck his seminary in Khyber Pakhtunkhwa's Bannu district.
