= 209 Al-Fatah Corps =

- Pashto: ۲۰۹ الفتح قول اردو
- Founded: October 2021
- Country: Afghanistan
- Allegiance: Islamic Emirate of Afghanistan
- Branch: Afghan Army
- Type: Corps
- Nickname: Al-Fatah

Commanders
- Chief of Staff: Abdul Razzaq Faizullah
- Commander: Amir Khan Haqqani
- Deputy Commander: Mullah Abdul Manan Akhund
- Notable commanders: Amanuddin Mansoor

The 209 Al-Fatah Corps is one of the eight corps of the Islamic Emirate Army established in October 2021 and headquartered in Mazar-i-Sharif. The current Chief of Staff is Abdul Razzaq Faizullah.

The Islamic Republic of Afghanistan-era corps it replaced was known as the 209th 'Shaheen' Corps and was a part of Afghan National Army.

== Command Staff ==
Chiefs of Staff
Chief of Staff	Period	Notes	Ref(s)
Abdul Razzaq Faizullah	4 October 2021 – Present		
Commanders
Commander	Period	Notes	Ref(s)
Attaullah Omari	4 October 2021 – 4 March 2022		
Amir Khan Haqqani	4 March 2022 – Present		
Deputy Commanders
Deputy Commander	Period	Notes	Ref(s)
Amanuddin Mansoor	4 October 2021 – 6 December 2021		
Mullah Abdul Manan Akhund	4 March 2022 – Present		
