= Ministry of Martyrs and Disabled Affairs =

Government ministry of Afghanistan

- Ministry flag

Department overview
- Formed: May 1992
- Type: Ministry
- Jurisdiction: Government of Afghanistan
- Headquarters: Kabul
- Minister responsible: Abdul Majeed Akhund
- Deputy Ministers responsible: Sheikh Maulvi Abdul Hakim
- Website: www.mmd.gov.af/en

The Ministry of Martyrs and Disabled Affairs or MoMDA or MMD (Pashto: د شهیدانو او معلولینو چارو وزارت) is a Ministry of the Government of Afghanistan responsible for people who are disabled or deemed to be martyrs. Abdul Majeed Akhund a Taliban leader was made the acting minister on 4 October 2021.

== History ==
The Ministry of Martyrs and Disabled Affairs (MMD) was established to lead, manage, monitor, and coordinate affairs related to the heirs of martyrs and people with disabilities. The ministry has experienced many ups and downs throughout its history. Afghanistan, as a war-torn country, continues to suffer from ongoing conflict, with millions of victims. Due to the increasing number of war casualties, there was an urgent need for a dedicated institution to provide services to the families of martyrs and people with disabilities. The MMD was established to address these needs and improve their living conditions.

In its early stages, the ministry's activities were sporadic and managed by different departments. Initially, its main goal was solely to pay salaries to the heirs of martyrs and people with disabilities, without any structured plans for improving their lives. After the coup of 1978, salaries for fallen government employees, including military personnel, civil employees, and mercenaries, were paid through the General Directorate of the Pension Fund under the Ministry of Finance, without consideration of their rank, position, or service duration. However, as the war continued and the number of victims increased, the General Directorate of the Pension Fund was unable to handle the growing demands. As a result, in 1990, this department was separated from the Pension Fund and began operating independently as the General Independent Directorate of Martyrs and Disabled Affairs under the supervision of the Grand Chancellor at the time.

With the ongoing war and the rising number of victims, the importance of a structured approach to handling these affairs grew. In May 1992, the Directorate was officially elevated to the level of a ministry, recognizing the need to provide greater respect and support for the heirs of martyrs and people with disabilities. From that point on, the ministry covered all related affairs under a unified structure. However, due to political instability and continuous crises, the department was merged with the Ministry of Refugees and Repatriations in 1996 during the Taliban government, operating as a deputy ministry.

In 2002, following the establishment of the transitional government, the department was once again promoted to ministerial status under the name "Ministry of Martyrs and Disabled Affairs." In 2006, it was merged with the Ministry of Labor and Social Affairs, forming the Ministry of Labor, Social Affairs, Martyrs, and Disabled. The affairs related to the heirs of martyrs and people with disabilities were managed under the deputy ministry within this structure.

On October 7, 2018, the National Office for the Protection of Heirs of Martyrs and People with Disabilities was separated from the Ministry of Labor and Social Affairs by Decree Number 75, allowing it to provide services independently under national law to support those who had sacrificed for the country. Subsequently, on January 19, 2019, according to Decree Number 132 of the Presidential Office, this department was re-established as the "State Ministry of Martyrs and Disabled Affairs." Finally, on January 25, 2021, Decree Number 157 promoted this institution to a full ministry, and it continues to operate as an independent entity within the framework of the Islamic Republic of Afghanistan.

== Ministers ==
| Name | Term | Leader of the Islamic Emirate of Afghanistan | Ref(s) |
|---|---|---|---|
| Abdul Majeed Akhund | Since 4 October 2021 | Hibatullah Akhundzada | |

Former Minister of State for Martyrs and Disabled:

- Laluddin Aryubi (2 September 2019 - 19 January 2021)
- Hamidullah Farooqi (19 January 2021)
- Mullah Abdul Majid Akhund (5 October 2021) acting

Deputy Minister:

- Mullah Abdul Razaq Akhund (5 October 2021)
- Sheikh Maulvi Abdul Hakim (22 November 2021)
