= Taliban conscription =

Conscription was employed in Afghanistan during Taliban administration between 1996 and 2001.

== Ante September 11, 2001 Taliban conscription ==
=== Kidnapping foreigners ===
Prior to the collapse of their regime the Taliban made widespread use of conscription, and according to some of the Guantanamo captives, kidnapping and virtual slavery.

=== Conscription of children ===
According to a report from Oxford University the Taliban made widespread use of the conscription of children in 1997, 1998 and 1999.

== Post September 11, Pre-collapse Taliban conscription ==
The Australian Broadcasting Corporation quoted a young Afghan, who reported: "They're rounding men up for a fight to the last man."

According to the ABC report Ahmed Zia said there had been a large-scale exodus from Kabul. He claimed the Taliban were rounding up young boys for battle. He also claimed the Taliban were forcing people to give blood.

The British paper The Daily Telegraph reported, on September 29, 2001, that the Taliban's supreme leader, Mullah Omar, had closed all Afghanistan's religious schools, so the students could fight beside the Taliban.

The Los Angeles Times, reported, on October 13, 2001, an account of a young man who had an encounter with Taliban members pressing men into service for them:

Samim, the young man who fled with his family, is an ethnic Tajik. He said he had a lucky escape Thursday night, walking home from the bazaar with his friend, Farid Alsoo. They stumbled across a Taliban patrol roughly shoving young men into a minivan. About five or 10 young men were already captive. The Taliban men seized Alsoo and pushed him into the van. They tried to get me, but I ran,' Samim said. 'They chased me for a few meters, but I got away,' he said, speaking in English. As the family breadwinner, he couldn't afford to be arrested or pressed to fight.

== Post-collapse Taliban conscription ==
=== Accounts of the Taliban's conscription policies from Guantanamo detainees ===
On March 3, 2006, after exhausting all it legal appeals, the US Department of Defense was forced to comply with a court order and release information about the identity of the captives held in extrajudicial detention in the Guantanamo Bay detainment camps, in Cuba. The DoD released thousands of pages of documents prepared for, or arising from, the captives' Combatant Status Review Tribunals and Administrative Review Board hearings.

Those thousands of pages of documents revealed that many of the detainees described themselves as conscripts, sometimes enlisted at gunpoint, and imprisoned in their barracks under armed guards, kept on hand for the Taliban to use as "cannon fodder".

=== "Enemy combatant" status ===
Some skeptical commentators have discounted the accounts of Guantanamo detainees whose stories suggested they weren't hardened terrorists. However, there are captives who even the American intelligence analysts acknowledged were reluctant conscripts.

Under questioning by US District Court Judge Joyce Hens Green, US Government lawyer Brian Boyle confirmed that the definition of "enemy combatant" status was so broad that even an elderly person from Switzerland, who sent money to what she thought was a legitimate charity, could be classified as an "enemy combatant" if workers for that charity clandestinely diverted some of its resources to back projects with ties to terrorism.

Some of the Guantanamo detainees had their classification as "enemy combatants" confirmed because they had a business arrangement to supply al Qaeda, or the Taliban, with mundane items, like firewood; some claimed they were enlisted at gunpoint, and housed in their barracks under armed guard; some claimed they were kidnapped, and employed as kitchen helpers, or servants, as virtual slaves; and some said that they were conscripted, not for military duties, but simply to perform civilian duties the Taliban couldn't fill through normal hiring practices.
