= Mir Mohammad =

Mir Mohammad مير محمد
- Village
- Location within Iran
- Coordinates: 35°33′36″N 59°32′07″E
- Country: Iran
- Province: Razavi Khorasan
- County: Fariman
- Bakhsh: Central
- Rural District: Balaband

Population (2006)
  - Total: 188
- Time zone: UTC+3:30 (IRST)
  - Summer (DST): UTC+4:30 (IRDT)

Mir Mohammad (Persian: مير محمد, also Romanized as Mīr Moḩammad and Mīr Muhammad; also known as Mīr Moḩammadī) is a village in Balaband Rural District, in the Central District of Fariman County, Razavi Khorasan Province, Iran. At the 2006 census, its population was 188, in 47 families.
