= Din Mohammad Hanif =

Afghan Taliban leader and politician

Qari Din Mohammad Hanif قاری دین محمد حنیف

Minister of Economy
- Incumbent
- Assumed office 7 September 2021 (Note: Acting: 7 September 2021 – 15 August 2025)
- Leader: Hibatullah Akhundzada

Minister of Planning and Minister of Higher Education
- In office c. 1996 – c. 2001
- Prime Minister: Mohammad Hassan Akhund (acting)
- Leader: Mohammed Omar
- Succeeded by: Abdul Baqi Haqqani (2021)

Personal details
- Born: 1955 (age 70–71) Yaftali Sufla District, Badakhshan province, Kingdom of Afghanistan
- Party: Taliban
- Occupation: Politician, Taliban member

Qari Din Mohammad Hanif (Dari: قاری دین محمد حنیف [qɑˈri din mʊˈhamad haˈnif]; born 1955) is an Afghan Taliban leader and the minister of economy. He is also a member of the Taliban Supreme Council and member of the negotiation team in the Taliban's Qatar office. He also served as the former Minister of Planning and Minister of Higher Education in the Islamic Emirate of Afghanistan before the fall in 2001.

== Early life and education ==
Hanif was born to Qari Muhammad Nazir in 1955 in the Yaftali Sufla District, Badakhshan province. At the age of 15, he memorized the Qur'an. Then he started elementary school with his father. When madrassas, religious and educational institutions were closed and destroyed due to wars he traveled to Khyber Pakhtunkhwa, Pakistan in 1985, where he continued his education in various schools and studied until the second-to-last year of Dars-i Nizami.

== Career ==
Before beginning his final year of study, the Taliban Movement emerged. He joined the movement with hundreds of students from Badakhshan Province. He served as the Minister of Planning and Minister of Higher Education until the fall of Kabul and the end of the 1996-2001 Islamic Emirate of Afghanistan government.

In 2003 he became the jihadi leader of Badakhshan province and in 2004 he became a member of the political commission. Similarly, by the order of Mullah Mohammed Omar, he was elected a member of the Leadership Council.

On 7 September 2021, he was appointed to Minister of Economy of the newly reorganized Islamic Emirate of Afghanistan.

He is said to be one of the few non-Pashtuns in the Taliban leadership because he is of Tajik descent from the northern province of Badakhshan.

== See also ==
- Amir Khan Muttaqi
- Abdul Latif Mansur
