= Ministry of Rural Rehabilitation and Development =

Government ministry of Afghanistan

- (Pashto: د کلیو د بیارغونې او پراختیا وزارت; Dari: وزارت بازسازی و انکشاف دهات)
- Ministry flag

Agency overview
- Jurisdiction: Government of Afghanistan
- Headquarters: Kabul, Afghanistan; 34.471312°N 69.117563°E
- Minister responsible: Mohammad Younus Akhundzada
- Deputy Ministers responsible: Abdul Rahman Halim; Mufti Saeed Ahmad Mustaqim; Qari Salahuddin Ayubi
- Website: mrrd.gov.af

The Ministry of Rural Rehabilitation and Development (Pashto: د کلیو د بیارغونې او پراختیا وزارت, Dari: وزارت بازسازی و انکشاف دهات) (MRRD) is a ministry of the Afghan government. Its main headquarters is located in Kabul, Afghanistan, but has offices and employees in all the 34 provinces of the country. MRRD's mission is to contribute to poverty alleviation in rural areas by empowering communities and fostering economic and social opportunities.

== Programs ==
The Ministry manages five national programmes:

The National Solidarity Programme (NSP)
Through this programme, MRRD, with the support of facilitating partners, mobilises communities, organises elections to establish Community Development Councils, builds capacity of elected members to manage projects, and provides grants to the communities so they can implement projects they have prioritised.
The National Area-Based Development Programme (NABDP)
Works at the district level and organises the establishment of District Development Assemblies (DDAs). The programme trains DDA members on several issues pertaining to rural development and implements projects identified as priorities by DDAs.
The Rural Water Sanitation and Irrigation Programme
Provides access to potable water and sanitation facilities to rural people. It also provides hygiene education and works on small scale irrigation infrastructure.
The National Rural Access Programme (NRAP)
Builds and rehabilitates tertiary and secondary roads.
The Afghanistan Rural Enterprise Development Programme (AREDP)
Supports the formation of Saving Groups, Village Saving and Loans Associations, and Enterprise Groups in rural areas. It also supports the development of Small and Medium Enterprises, facilitating their access to financial products and providing them with technical support.

MRRD offers training on rural development issues through its Afghanistan Institute for Rural Development.

== Previous Ministers ==
Name	Term	Notes
Abdul Malik Anwar	December 2001 - July 2002	United Islamic Front
Mohamad Hanif Atmar	July 2002 - March 2006	
Mohammed Ehsan Zia	March 2006 - 2010	
Jarullah Mansouri	January 2010 - February 2012	Became minister after the Wolesi Jirga rejected the first candidate, Owais Ahmad Barmak
Wais Ahmad Barmak	February 2012 - December 2014	
Mohammad Tariq Ismati	December 2014 - January 2015	Acting Minister
Nasir Ahmad Durrani	January 2015 - September 2017	
Mujiburrahman Karimi		
Mohammad Younus Akhundzada	7 September 2021 - present	Islamic Emirate of Afghanistan
