= Abdul Majeed Akhund =

Afghan Taliban politician

Mullah Abdul Majeed Akhund عبدالمجید آخوند

Minister of Martyrs and Disabled Affairs
- Acting
- Assumed office 4 October 2021
- Prime Minister: Mohammad Hassan Akhund (acting)
- Deputy: Mullah Abdul Razzaq Akhund (acting)
- Supreme Leader: Hibatullah Akhundzada

Personal details
- Profession: Politician, Taliban member

Mullah Abdul Majeed Akhund (ملا عبدالمجید آخند) is an Afghan Taliban politician who became the Acting Minister of Martyrs and Disabled Affairs on 4 October 2021.
