= Abdul Salam Baryali =

Senior Taliban member (1968–2017)

Mullah Abdul Salam Baryalai Akhund (1968 – February 26, 2017) was a senior Taliban member. He was serving as the group's shadow governor for Kunduz Province before his death in February 2017. He was reportedly also the group's senior military commander over a large portion of northern Afghanistan.

== Biography ==
In the 2000s, Salam served as the Deputy Minister of Education of the Taliban regime. He also held control over Jowzjan Province as a Taliban commander until 2008.

He was captured and arrested in Faisalabad, Pakistan, around February 2010. He was set free in a negotiated prisoner release between the Afghan High Peace Council and the Pakistani government in 2013.

In October 2016, he was wounded during clashes with the Afghan National Security Forces (ANSF) in northern Kunduz Province, Afghanistan. According to sources, Abdul-Salam was injured during clashes with ANSF and was taken to a hospital in Char Dara District.

It was reported on February 27, 2017, that Abdul-Salam and a number of his men were killed in a drone attack in Archi District, Kunduz Province. The Taliban group soon confirmed his death. Moussa al-Omar tweeted on his death. The 2017 Camp Shaheen attack was reportedly a retaliation for his death.
