= Sheikh Mohammad Khalid =

Islamic Law Minister of Afghanistan since 2021

Sheikh Mohammad Khalid محمدخالد حنفی
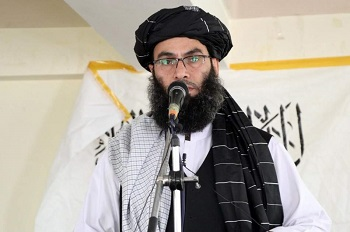

Minister for Propagation of Virtue and Prevention of Vice
- Incumbent
- Assumed office 7 September 2021; Acting: 7 September 2021 – 15 August 2025
- Supreme Leader: Hibatullah Akhundzada
- Prime Minister: Hasan Akhund
- Preceded by: Office re-established

Personal details
- Occupation: Politician
- Political affiliation: Taliban

Mohammad Khalid Hanafi (Dari: محمدخالد حنفی [ʃɪx mʊˈhamad xɑˈlɪd]) is the Minister for the Propagation of Virtue and the Prevention of Vice (Minister of Dawat-wal-Irshad) of the Islamic Emirate of Afghanistan since 7 September 2021. He is an ethnic Nuristani, from Kolam village, Nuristan Province.

On 15 August 2025, Supreme Leader Hibatullah Akhundzada reappointed Khalid and the rest of the Akhund cabinet to their positions on a permanent basis.

== International sanctions ==
On 7 March 2023, he was blacklisted by the EU authorities, having been identified as an active contributor to continued widespread state-sponsored violations of women's and girls' rights across Afghanistan by the new Taliban government. He was also sanctioned on similar grounds by Australia in 2025.
