= Abdul Manan Omari =

Afghan Taliban leader

- عبدالمنان عمری

Acting Minister of Public Works
- In office 7 September 2021 – 23 January 2023
- Supreme Leader: Hibatullah Akhundzada
- Prime Minister: Hasan Akhund (acting)
- Succeeded by: Mohammad Esa Thani

Head of the Preaching and Guidance Commission of the Islamic Emirate of Afghanistan
- Incumbent
- Assumed office c. 2016
- Supreme Leader: Hibatullah Akhundzada

Personal details
- Party: Taliban
- Relatives: Mohammed Omar (stepbrother)
- Profession: Politician

Mullah Abdul Manan Omari (Pashto: ملا عبدالمنان عمری [ˈabdʊl maˈnɑn omaˈri]) is an Afghan senior leader of the Taliban who served as acting Minister of Public Works from 7 September 2021 to 23 January 2023. He was a central member of the negotiation team in Qatar office. He is the stepbrother of Mullah Omar.

In 2016, Abdul Manan was appointed as chief of the Taliban's religious affairs and Dawah as well as a member of the Taliban leadership.

He is from Uruzgan province of Afghanistan.
