= Ministry for the Propagation of Virtue and the Prevention of Vice (Afghanistan) =

Afghan Islamic law ministry

- وزارت امر بالمعروف، نهی عن المنکر وسمع شکایات (Dari); د امربالمعروف، نهی عن المنکر او شکایتونو اورېدلو وزارت (Pashto)

Ministry overview
- Formed: 1992/96 (original); 2021 (current)
- Preceding Ministry: Ministry of Women's Affairs
- Jurisdiction: Government of Afghanistan
- Headquarters: Kabul, Afghanistan
- Minister responsible: Sheikh Mohammad Khalid
- Ministry executive: Akif Muhajir, spokesman
- Website: mopvpe.gov.af

The Ministry for the Propagation of Virtue and the Prevention of Vice (Pashto: د امربالمعروف، نهی عن المنکر او شکایتونو اورېدلو وزارت; Dari: وزارت امر بالمعروف، نهی عن المنکر وسمع شکایات) is the state agency in charge of implementing Islamic law in the Islamic Emirate of Afghanistan as defined by the Taliban. It was first instituted in 1992 by the Rabbani government of the Islamic State of Afghanistan and adopted in 1996 by the Taliban government of the Islamic Emirate of Afghanistan of 1996–2001. The ministry was restored in the reinstated Islamic Emirate in September 2021 after the August fall of Kabul.

== History ==
=== First Islamic Emirate of Afghanistan ===
Originally established in 1992 and later reorganized into its current form in 1996, the vice and virtue ministry received heavy subsidies and training from Saudi Arabia. When the Taliban took over Kabul, the committee announced a ban on sorcery and American-style haircuts. It was closed when the Talibans were ousted, but Fazal Hadi Shinwari, an outspoken advocate of orthodoxy and the Chief Justice of the Supreme Court of Afghanistan, reinstated it in 2003 and renamed it the Ministry for Haj and Religious Affairs.

=== Islamic Republic of Afghanistan ===
In 2006, the Karzai government submitted draft legislation to create a new department, under the Ministry for Haj and Religious Affairs, devoted to the "Promotion of Virtue and Prevention of Vice". According to Ghazi Suleiman Hamed, Deputy Minister for Haj and Religious Affairs, the new department would operate more benignly than the Taliban version. The minister of Haj and religious affairs Nematullah Shahrani stated that the new department would focus on alcohol, drugs, crime and corruption.

According to Human Rights Watch, reinstating the virtue and vice department would have a negative impact on women rights, a major lever of development for the country. Shukria Barakzai, a member of Afghanistan's National Legislature, saw in this draft legislation a reminiscing legacy of the Taliban era. Felice D. Gaer, Chair of the United States Commission on International Religious Freedom, stated that the US expressed a strong opposition to reinstatement of the ministry of virtue and vice, calling it a violation to religious freedom rights.

=== Second Islamic Emirate of Afghanistan ===
In the 2021 Islamic Emirate Cabinet declared on 7 September 2021, following the 15 August 2021 fall of Kabul, the ministry was restored, according to The Guardian. The Cabinet itself was restricted to men only. The ministry was installed in the offices of the former Ministry of Women's Affairs, displacing staff of the World Bank's Women's Economic Empowerment and Rural Development Program.

In March 2022, the Islamic Emirate required all men to sport a beard as a condition of government employment.

In May 2022, the ministry published a decree requiring all women in Afghanistan to wear full-body coverings when in public (either a burqa or an abaya paired with a niqāb, which leaves only the eyes uncovered). The decree said enforcement action including fines, prison time, or termination from government employment would be taken against male "guardians" who fail to ensure their female relatives abide by the law. Rights groups, including the United Nations Mission in Afghanistan, sharply criticized the decision. The decision is expected to adversely affect the Islamic Emirate's chances of international recognition. The decree was drafted by the ministry and personally approved by Supreme Leader Hibatullah Akhundzada. In an interview with Christiane Amanpour, First Deputy Leader and Acting Interior Minister Sirajuddin Haqqani claimed the decree is only advisory and no form of hijab is compulsory in Afghanistan, though this contradicts the reality. It has been speculated that there is a genuine internal policy division over women's rights between hardliners, including Akhundzada, and pragmatists, though they publicly present a united front.

In October 2024, the ministry announced it would impose a gradual restriction on the news media, prohibiting content that "humiliates" Islam or contradicts sharia, including publishing images of living things.

== List of ministers ==
=== Second Islamic Emirate of Afghanistan ===
No.	Portrait	Name (Birth–Death)	Term of office			Political affiliation	Ref.
No.	Portrait	Name (Birth–Death)	Took office	Left office	Time in office	Political affiliation	Ref.
–		Sheikh Mohammad Khalid	7 September 2021	15 August 2025	4 years, 339 days	Taliban	
1		Sheikh Mohammad Khalid	15 August 2025	Incumbent	4 years, 339 days	Taliban	

== Name ==
In the 2000 book Taliban by Ahmed Rashid, the ministry is referred to as the Department of the Promotion of Virtue and the Prevention of Vice. Mohammed Qalamuddin, the head of the ministry during the first Taliban era, preferred the English translation Department of Religious Observances.

== Role and actions ==
The Ministry for the Propagation of Virtue and the Prevention of Vice of Afghanistan is in charge of implementing Islamic rules (Hanafi principles) as defined by the Taliban. Its religious police raided the streets arresting women not fully covered and people listening to music.

== See also ==
- Enjoining what is right and forbidding what is wrong (Promotion of Virtue and Prevention of Vice)
- Talibanization
- Islamic religious police
- Committee for the Propagation of Virtue and the Prevention of Vice (Saudi Arabia)
- Committee for the Propagation of Virtue and the Prevention of Vice (Gaza Strip)
- Guidance Patrol, Iran's morality police
