= Mohammad Younus Akhundzada =

Rural Minister of Afghanistan since 2021

Mohammad Younus Akhundzada محمد یونس آخوندزادہ

Minister for Rural Rehabilitation and Development
- Incumbent
- Assumed office 7 September 2021 (Note: Acting: 7 September 2021 – 15 August 2025)
- Prime Minister: Mohammad Hassan Akhund
- Supreme Leader: Hibatullah Akhundzada

Personal details
- Party: Taliban
- Occupation: Politician, Taliban member

Mullah Mohammad Younus Akhundzada (Pashto: محمد یونس آخوندزادہ [mʊˈhamad ˈjunɪs ɑxundzɑˈda]) is the Rural Minister of the Islamic Emirate of Afghanistan.
