= Attaullah Omari =

Afghan Deputy Minister and commander

Mawlawi Attaullah Omari عطاالله عمری

Deputy Minister of Defense for Technology and Logistics
- Incumbent
- Assumed office 4 March 2022 (Note: Acting: 4 March 2022 – 15 August 2025)
- Prime Minister: Mohammad Hassan Akhund
- Leader: Hibatullah Akhundzada

Deputy Minister of Agriculture, Irrigation and Livestock
- In office 23 September 2021 – 4 March 2022
- Leader: Hibatullah Akhundzada

Commander of Al-Fatah Corps
- In office 4 October 2021 – 4 March 2022
- Succeeded by: Amir Khan Haqqani

Personal details
- Party: Taliban
- Occupation: Politician, Taliban member

Maulvi Attaullah Omari is an Afghan Taliban politician and military commander who is serving as Deputy Minister of Technology and Logistics at Ministry of Defense since 4 March 2022. Omari has also served as Deputy Minister of Agriculture, Irrigation and Livestock from 23 September 2021 to 4 March 2022 and commander of Al-Fatah Corps from 4 October 2021 4 March 2022.
