= Ministry of Economy (Afghanistan) =

Government ministry of Afghanistan

Afghan Ministry of Economy
- Dari: وزارت اقتصاد افغانستان; Pashto: د افغانستان د اقتصاد وزارت
- Ministry flag

Agency overview
- Jurisdiction: Government of Afghanistan
- Headquarters: Kabul, Afghanistan; 34.531188°N 69.163313°E
- Minister responsible: Din Mohammad Hanif
- Deputy Minister responsible: Abdul Latif Nazari
- Website: https://moec.gov.af/en

The Afghan Ministry of Economy (Dari: وزارت اقتصاد افغانستان, Pashto: د افغانستان د اقتصاد وزارت) is the Afghan Government Ministry in charge of stimulating the Economy of the country. The current Minister of Economy is Din Mohammad Hanif.

== Ministers ==
No.	Name	Length of Term		Notes
No.	Name	Term start	Term end	Notes
1	Mohammad Amin Farhang	December 2004	March 2006	Previously Minister of Reconstruction. Had to resign because the Afghan Parliament wouldn't approve his nomination.
2	Mohammad Jalil Shams	March 2006	January 2010	Previously Deputy Minister of Energy and Water.
3	Anwar ul-Haq Ahadi	January 2010	January 2010	Previously Presidential Candidate and Minister of Finance. Didn't receive the required vote of confidence of the Afghan Parliament.
4	Abdul Hadi Arghandiwal	January 2010	?	Head of the (moderate breakaway faction of the) Hezb-i Islami Afghanistan.
5	Mohammad Mustafa Mastoor	December 2017	August 2021	Previously Deputy Minister of Finance Ministry of Finance (Afghanistan).
6	Din Mohammad Hanif	7 September 2021	Present	Islamic Emirate of Afghanistan government minister.

Former Minister of Economy

- Dr. Mir Mohd. Amin Farhang (2006),
- Dr. Jalil Shams (2006-2009),
- Abdul Hadi Arghandiwal (2010-20140930),
- Abdul Hadi Arghandiwal acting Minister (20141001)
- acting Minister of Economy Hakem Khan Habibi Hakim Khan Habibi (20141209)
- Dr. Karima Hamed Faryabi nominated and acting (20200913) confirmed (20201201)
- Qari Din Mohammad Hanif (20210907) acting

Deputy Minister of Economy:

- Eng. Sher Mohammad Jami Zada Eng. Shir Mohammad Jami (2011, 20140100)
- Hakim Khan Habibi (20140923)
- Dr. Abdul Sattar Murad (20150418, 20170813)
- Dr. Mohammad Mustafa Mastoor (20171204 confirmed)
- Ajmal Ahmadi Minister of Commerce and Industry acting (20190206)
- Dr. Abdul Latif Nazari (20211225, 20230528))
