= Mullah Omar =

Supreme Leader of Afghanistan from 1996 to 2001

Amir al-Mu'minin; Mullah; Muhammad Omar
- محمد عمر
- Omar in 1993

Supreme Leader of Afghanistan
- In office 27 September 1996 – 13 November 2001; Disputed by Burhanuddin Rabbani (as President)
- Prime Minister: Mohammad Rabbani; Abdul Kabir (acting)
- Deputy: Mohammad Rabbani (1996–2001); Vacant (Apr–Nov 2001)
- Preceded by: Burhanuddin Rabbani (as President)
- Succeeded by: Burhanuddin Rabbani (as President)
- In exile 13 November 2001 – 23 April 2013
- Deputy: First Deputy; Abdul Ghani Baradar (2002–2010); Akhtar Mansur (2010–2013); Second Deputy; Obaidullah Akhund (2002–2007); Akhtar Mansur (2007–2010)
- Succeeded by: Akhtar Mansur
- In exile 4 April 1996 – 27 September 1996
- Deputy: Mohammad Rabbani
- Preceded by: Position established

Personal details
- Born: Muhammad Umar Mujahid c. 1950 to 1962 Kandahar, Kingdom of Afghanistan
- Died: 23 April 2013 (aged 51 to 63) Taizeni, Afghanistan
- Cause of death: Tuberculosis
- Resting place: Zabul Province, Afghanistan
- Height: 1.83 m (6 ft 0 in)
- Spouse: At least 3 wives
- Children: At least 5 (including Mullah Yaqoob)
- Relatives: Abdul Manan Omari (stepbrother)
- Ethnicity: Pashtun
- Tribe: Hotak
- Religion: Sunni Islam
- Maddhab: Hanafi

Military service
- Allegiance: Mujahideen (1979–1992); Harakat-i-Inqilab-i-Islami (1983–1989); Hezb-i Islami Khalis (1989–1992); Taliban (1994–2013)
- Years of service: 1979–1992; 1994–2013
- Battles/wars: Soviet–Afghan War; First Afghan Civil War; Battle of Jalalabad; Second Afghan Civil War; Third Afghan Civil War; War in Afghanistan (2001–2021)

Muhammad Umar Mujahid (Note: Pashto: محمد عمر مجاهد, romanized: Muḥammad ʿUmar Mujāhid) (c. 1950 to 1962 – 23 April 2013), commonly known as Mullah Omar (Note: Pashto: ملا عمر, romanized: Mulla ʿUmar) or Muhammad Omar, was an Afghan militant and religious leader who served as the first supreme leader of Afghanistan from 1996 to 2001. He founded the Taliban, an Islamist militant organization, in 1994 and served as its first supreme leader until his death in 2013. During the Third Afghan Civil War, the Taliban fought the Northern Alliance and took control of most of the country, establishing its first Islamic Emirate. Shortly after the militant group al-Qaeda carried out the September 11 attacks in 2001, the Taliban government was toppled by an American invasion of Afghanistan, prompting Omar to go into hiding. While evading capture by the American-led coalition, he died from tuberculosis in 2013.

Born into a religious family in Kandahar, Afghanistan, Omar was educated at local madrasas. After Afghanistan was invaded by the Soviet Union in 1979, he joined the mujahideen to fight in the Soviet–Afghan War and was trained by Amir Sultan Tarar. Omar served as an important rebel commander during several skirmishes, losing his right eye in an explosion. The Soviets eventually withdrew from the country in 1989 and Afghanistan's Soviet-backed Democratic Republic was toppled in 1992, triggering the Second Afghan Civil War. While initially remaining quiet and focused on continuing his studies, Omar became increasingly discontent with what he perceived as fasād in the country, ultimately prompting him to return to fighting in the Civil War.

In 1994, Omar, along with religious students in Kandahar, formed the Taliban, which emerged victorious against other Afghan factions by 1996. Omar led the Taliban to form a Sunni Islamic theocracy headed by the Supreme Council, known as the Islamic Emirate of Afghanistan, which strictly enforced the Sharia. While ruling between 1996 and 2001, the Taliban were widely condemned for committing massacres against civilians, discriminating against religious and ethnic minorities, banning women from school and most employment, and destroying cultural monuments, including the Buddhas of Bamiyan, which Omar personally ordered by a decree.

After al-Qaeda, which had previously been given sanctuary in Afghanistan by the Taliban, carried out the September 11 attacks against the United States in 2001, American president George W. Bush demanded that the Taliban extradite al-Qaeda's General Emir, Osama bin Laden, to the United States. The Taliban, under the leadership of Mullah Omar, refused to extradite him to the U.S. without concrete evidence linking him to the attacks, and they requested proof of his involvement in 9/11. The United States, however, had enough proof of him being in Afghanistan and under the Taliban's protection, and subsequently began the Global War on Terrorism and led a multinational invasion of Afghanistan in October 2001, which was greatly bolstered by the anti-Taliban Northern Alliance. By December 2001, the Taliban government had been ousted by the American-led coalition; Omar fled Kandahar, went into hiding in Zabul Province, and delegated operational control of the Taliban to his deputies. Under his command, the Taliban launched an insurgency against the new Afghan government and the coalition. Although Omar was the subject of a decade-long international manhunt, he remained in hiding for the rest of his life. He died in 2013, reportedly due to tuberculosis, which was not revealed publicly until 2015. In 2021, the Taliban deposed the Afghan government and regained power following the fall of Kabul.

Omar remains a largely popular figure amongst the Taliban, who view him as a key freedom fighter who defended Afghanistan's Islamic principles – first against the Soviet empire and later against the Western world. Others have criticised him for his method of governance and his religious dogmatism. Some Sufis in Afghanistan have referred Mullah Omar as the Dajjal due to him being blind in one eye, a characteristic held by Dajjal in Islamic literature.

== Early life and education ==
Omar as hafiz student in his youth, 1978, colourised

Muhammed Omar was born between 1950 and 1962 into a poor Pashtun farmer family. According to the biography provided by the Taliban, he was born in the village of Chah-i-Himmat in Khakrez District of Kandahar Province, Kingdom of Afghanistan. Another timeline was also presented by The Daily Telegraph that he was born in Uruzgan Province. At 1.98 m (6 ft 6 in) or 1.83 m (6 ft 0 in), he was the tallest boy in his family.

He came from a line of Islamic scholars and teachers. His father was Mawlawi Ghulam Nabi, his grandfather Mawlawi Muhammad Rasool, and his great-grandfather Mawlawi Baz Muhammad. They were of the Tomzi clan of the Hotak tribe, which is part of the larger Ghilji tribal confederation of the Pashtuns. His father, born in Khakrez District, was a poor, landless itinerant teacher who taught the Quran to village boys and received alms from their families. He died when Omar was three years old, according to Omar's own words, or five years old, according to the Taliban biography. Thereafter Omar was raised by his uncles. One of his father's brothers, Maulawi Muzafer, married Omar's widowed mother, as was often done in rural Afghanistan.

The family moved to the village of Dehwanawark, several miles from the town of Deh Rawood, in the poor Deh Rawood District in Uruzgan Province, where the uncle was a religious teacher. According to former Afghan president Hamid Karzai, "Omar's father was a local religious leader, but the family was poor and had absolutely no political links in Kandahar or Kabul. They were essentially lower middle class Afghans and were definitely not members of the elite."

Omar studied at a religious school or madrasa run by his uncle. According to Gopal and Strick van Linschoten, all of his religious education was in Afghan hujras, which are small religious schools annexed to village mosques. He completed his primary and secondary religious education, then began higher religious studies at 18. His studies were interrupted before completion and he did not properly earn the title "Mullah." Later, he would be awarded an honorary degree by the Jamia Uloom-ul-Islamia seminary in Karachi, Pakistan, but never studied there, contrary to some reports. He was also given an honorary doctorate by Darul Uloom Haqqania in northwestern Pakistan, where numerous other senior Taliban leaders studied. Some sources have claimed that he studied there, but its leader Sami-ul-Haq said that he did not know of Omar until 1994.

Much of Omar's early and personal life remains either secret or is the subject of conflicting reports. In April 2015, during the time when his death was being kept secret, the Taliban published a biography of Omar to mark his "19th year as their supreme leader"; in fact, he had died on 23 April 2013.

== Soviet–Afghan War (1979–1989) ==
After the Soviet invasion of Afghanistan in 1979, Omar joined the mujahideen in Deh Rawood to fight the Soviets. In 1983 he moved with mujahideen friends to Maywand District in Kandahar Province and fought under Faizullah Akhundzada, the commander of a group affiliated with Harakat-i-Inqilab-i-Islami (Islamic and National Revolution Movement). Abdul Ghani Baradar was another from Deh Rawood who was in the group. Omar fought in the Maiwand, Zhari, Panjwai and Dand districts and was an expert in using rocket-propelled grenades against tanks. In the last years of the war, some mujahideen groups split up, and Omar and his friends left Faizullah Akhundzada's group. They formed a new group under Omar's leadership, based at Aday, in the Singesar area, then in the Panjwayi District and now in Zhari District, and became registered with Harakat-i-Inqilab-i-Islami as an affiliated group. Omar was wounded four times. Abdul Salam Zaeef has said he was present when exploding shrapnel destroyed Omar's right eye at Singesar during the 1987 Battle of Arghandab. Other sources place this event in 1986 or in the 1989 Battle of Jalalabad. Omar went to a hospital in Quetta, Pakistan, for treatment to his eye wound. According to former Taliban official Abdul Hai Mutmaen (or Mutma'in), this was the only time that Omar ever went to Pakistan, and that he returned after treatment. According to Dutch journalist Bette Dam, in research published in 2019, he went to Pakistan on one other occasion during the war, to fetch weapons following a dispute within his mujahideen group. Mutmaen denies that Omar went there for weapons, but acknowledges that a few members of Omar's family claim he visited Pakistan four times during the war – once for the injury, then to register his group, and two visits to injured friends.

=== Soviet withdrawal and fight against the Democratic Republic ===
The Soviets withdrew from Afghanistan in 1989. According to Ahmed Rashid, Omar joined the mujahideen group Hezb-i Islami Khalis and fought under the command of Nek Mohammed against Mohammad Najibullah's communist regime between 1989 and 1992.

After Najibullah's government collapsed in 1992, Omar and a group of mujahideen turned their base near Haji Ibrahim Mosque in Gheshano village, in the Singesar area, into a madrassa. As well as teaching there, Omar resumed his own studies that had been interrupted by the war. Unlike many Afghan mujaheddin, Omar spoke Arabic. He was devoted to the lectures of Sheikh Abdullah Azzam.

== Forming the Taliban (1994) ==
After Najibullah's regime ended, the country fell into chaos as various mujahideen factions fought for control. According to one legend, Omar had a dream in 1994 in which a woman told him: "We need your help; you must rise. You must end the chaos. God will help you." Omar started his movement with fewer than 50 armed madrasa students who were simply known as the Taliban (Pashto for 'students'). His recruits came from madrasas located in Afghanistan and the Afghan refugee camps across the border with Pakistan. They fought against the rampant corruption which had emerged during the civil war period and were initially welcomed by Afghans weary of warlord rule. Sickened by the abusive raping of children by warlords (Bacha bazi), they turned against their authority in the mountainous country of Afghanistan from 1994 onwards.

Two influential anti-Soviet political leaders who were connected with Peshawar during this era were Mohammad Yunus Khalis and Mohammad Nabi Mohammadi; both exerted a considerable influence over the Taliban, particularly in the southern parts of the country, including Kandahar. Many of those who later formed the core of the Taliban, including Omar, fought under the command of factions that were loyal to Nabi Mohammadi. These factions had helped proliferate madrasas, attended by many of the Kandahar Taliban, throughout the southern regions of Afghanistan.

The practice of bacha bazi by warlords was one of the key factors in Omar mobilizing the Taliban. In early 1994, Omar led 30 men armed with 16 rifles to free two young girls who had been kidnapped and raped by a warlord, hanging him from a tank gun barrel. Another instance arose when in 1994, a few months before the Taliban took control of Kandahar, two militia commanders confronted each other over a young boy whom they both wanted to sodomize. In the ensuing fight, Omar's group freed the boy; appeals soon flooded in for Omar to intercede in other disputes. His movement gained momentum through the year and he quickly gathered recruits from Islamic schools totaling 12,000 by the year's end with some Pakistani volunteers. By November 1994, Omar's movement managed to capture the whole of the Kandahar Province and then captured the Herat Province in September 1995. Some accounts estimated that by the spring of 1995 he had already taken 12 of the 31 provinces in Afghanistan.

== Islamic Emirate of Afghanistan (1996–2001) ==
=== Leadership ===
A still from a 1996 video taken secretly by BBC Newsnight. It purports to show Omar (left) presenting the cloak of Muhammad to his troops in Kandahar, before their successful assault on Kabul.

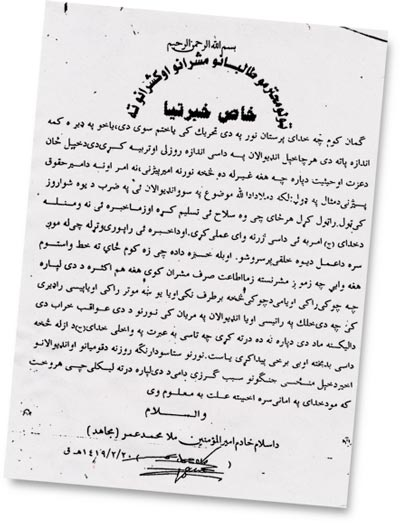
The June 15, 1998 letter from Mullah Omar to "all Taliban members young and old", complaining that his orders are not being followed. The letter was found in an al-Qaeda safe house in Kabul.

On 4 April 1996, supporters of Omar bestowed the title Amir al-Mu'minin (أمير المؤمنين, lit. 'Commander of the Faithful') on him, after he showed a cloak which was alleged to be that of Muhammad, locked in a series of chests and held inside the Shrine of the Cloak in the city of Kandahar. Legend decreed that whoever could retrieve the cloak from the chest would be the great Leader of the Muslims, or the "Amir al-Mu'minin".

In September 1996, Kabul fell to Omar and his followers. The civil war continued in the northeast corner of the country, near Tajikistan. In October 1997 the nation was named the Islamic Emirate of Afghanistan and recognized by Pakistan, Saudi Arabia and the United Arab Emirates. Described as a "reclusive, pious and frugal" leader, Omar rarely left his residence in the city of Kandahar, and he only visited Kabul twice between 1996 and 2001 during his tenure as ruler of Afghanistan. In November 2001, during a radio interview with the BBC, Omar stated: "All Taliban are moderate. There are two things: extremism ['ifraat', or doing something to excess] and conservatism ['tafreet', or doing something insufficiently]. So in that sense, we are all moderates – taking the middle path." During his tenure as Afghanistan's ruler, Omar seldom left the city of Kandahar, where he lived in a large house reportedly built for him by Osama bin Laden, the Saudi militant who was the founder of al-Qaeda.

Omar had a complicated relationship with Osama bin Laden. According to Pakistani journalist Rahimullah Yusufzai, Omar stated in the late 1990s, "We have told Osama [Bin Laden] not to use Afghan soil to carry out political activities as it creates unnecessary confusion about Taliban objectives." Bin Laden was a challenge for Omar: he was widely seen as a defender of the faith, had deep pockets, and if he were to censure the Taliban, the movement would likely end. However, Omar did not want bin Laden spreading a message of jihad. Omar summoned bin Laden to meet him in 1996 after bin Laden's declaration of jihad against the United States the same year. He asked bin Laden to stop talking about the jihad, but as a matter of Pashtun tribal custom did not outright forbid him, as it would be deeply insulting to a guest. Bin Laden chose to ignore Omar. The high stature of bin Laden and his importance in keeping the Taliban in power were further evidenced by Omar visiting bin Laden as a guest, a sign of deference and respect. After the 1998 United States embassy bombings, the US launched cruise missiles against al-Qaeda training camps and sought bin Laden. This inadvertently created more sympathy for bin Laden in Afghanistan. Omar did not hand bin Laden over, citing Pashtunwali tribal customs that require a host to protect guests, and that bin Laden was a guest of Afghanistan. Privately, Omar felt that if he bowed to the US by turning over bin Laden, the US would try to further influence Afghanistan and attempt to meddle in its religious matters. He may have also feared retaliation or withdrawal of support from the Saudi or Pakistani governments should he turn over bin Laden. In 2000, Omar ordered bin Laden to not attack the United States, after advisors warned him that bin Laden might be planning to do so. Omar suggested to the US that bin Laden be turned over to an international Islamic court, or simply exiled, but the US turned both suggestions down.

Omar was also "Head of the Supreme Council of Afghanistan". The Supreme Council was initially established at Kandahar in 1994.

According to a 2001 United Nations report, the Taliban committed systematic massacres against civilians between 1996 and 2001 while trying to consolidate control over northern and western Afghanistan. The report said that such mass killings were ordered or approved by Omar himself and that bin Laden's 055 Brigade, made up of Arab fighters, was involved in these massacres.

=== Demolition of the Buddhas of Bamiyan ===
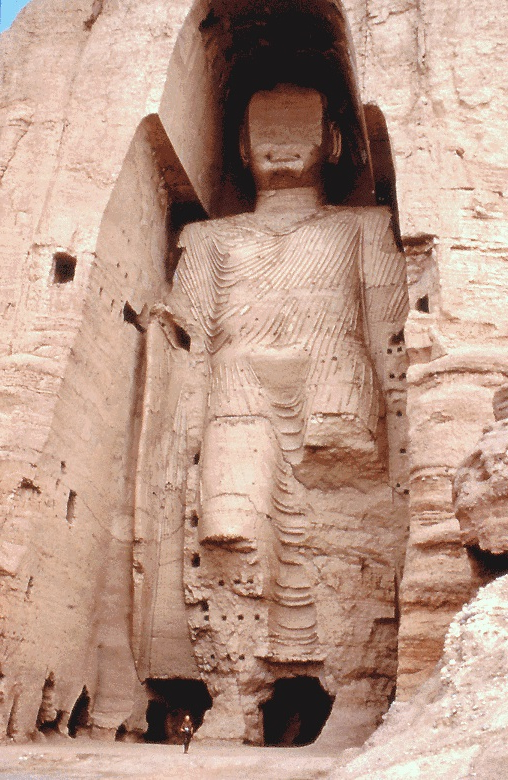
Mullah Omar ordered the destruction of the Buddhas of Bamiyan (pictured in 1976) in March 2001, receiving international condemnation.

In July 1999, Mohammed Omar issued a decree in favor of the preservation of the Bamiyan Buddha statues. Because Afghanistan's Buddhist population no longer exists, so the statues are no longer worshiped, he added: "The government considers the Bamiyan statues as an example of a potential major source of income for Afghanistan from international visitors. The Taliban states that Bamiyan shall not be destroyed but protected."

In early 2000, local Taliban authorities asked for UN assistance to rebuild the drainage ditches atop the alcoves within which the Buddhas were set.

In March 2001, the statues were destroyed by the Taliban under an edict issued from Omar, stating: "all the statues around Afghanistan must be destroyed." This prompted an international outcry. Information and Culture Minister Qadratullah Jamal told Associated Press of a decision by 400 religious clerics from across Afghanistan declaring the Buddhist statues against the tenets of Islam. "They came out with a consensus that the statues were against Islam", said Jamal. A statement issued by the Ministry of Religious Affairs of the Taliban regime justified the destruction as being in accordance with Islamic law. The then Taliban ambassador to Pakistan Abdul Salam Zaeef held that the destruction of the Buddhas was finally ordered by Abdul Wali, the Minister for the Propagation of Virtue and the Prevention of Vice.

Omar explained why he ordered the statues to be destroyed in an interview:

I did not want to destroy the Bamiyan Buddha. In fact, some foreigners came to me and said they would like to conduct the repair work of the Bamiyan Buddha that had been slightly damaged due to rains. This shocked me. I thought, these callous people have no regard for thousands of living human beings – the Afghans who are dying of hunger, but they are so concerned about non-living objects like the Buddha. This was extremely deplorable. That is why I ordered its destruction. Had they come for humanitarian work, I would have never ordered the Buddha's destruction.

=== Opium production ===
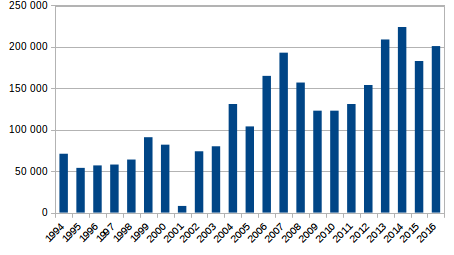
Afghanistan opium poppy cultivation, 1994–2007 (hectares). Before the US invasion of Afghanistan in 2001, opium production was almost entirely eradicated (99%) by the Taliban.

Between 1996 and 1999, the Taliban controlled 96% of Afghanistan's poppy fields and made opium its largest source of taxation. Taxes on opium exports was the primary source of income for the Taliban during its rule and subsequent insurgency after 2001. In July 2000, Taliban leader Mohammed Omar, in an effort to eradicate heroin production in Afghanistan, declared that growing poppies was un-Islamic, resulting in one of the world's most successful anti-drug campaigns. The Taliban enforced a ban on poppy farming via threats, forced eradication, and public punishment of transgressors. The result was a 99% reduction in the area of opium poppy farming in Taliban-controlled areas, roughly three-quarters of the world's supply of heroin at the time. The ban was effective only briefly due to the deposition of the Taliban in 2001.

After returning to power following the fall of Kabul in August 2021, the Taliban again moved to eradicate opium production. In April 2022, Taliban supreme leader Hibatullah Akhundzada issued a decree banning the cultivation of opium poppy and all types of narcotics across Afghanistan. The ban resulted in a dramatic decline in poppy cultivation; by 2023, a UN report recorded a reduction of over 95% in poppy cultivation nationwide, displacing Afghanistan from its position as the world's largest opium producer. In Helmand Province, by far the country's largest opium-producing region prior to the ban, cultivation collapsed from an estimated 129,640 hectares in 2022 to just 740 hectares in 2023—a reduction of 99%. According to the UNODC, cultivation increased by approximately 19% in 2024 to an estimated 12,800 hectares, largely driven by a geographic shift to northeastern provinces; however, this remained far below the pre-ban level of 232,000 hectares recorded in 2022. The ban caused significant economic hardship for rural Afghan farmers, who had previously relied on opium as a primary source of income, with analysts warning of deepening poverty and political instability if sustainable alternative livelihoods are not developed.

=== September 11 attacks by al-Qaeda ===
Following the September 11 attacks on the United States carried out by al-Qaeda, the United States under the Bush administration issued an ultimatum to Afghanistan to hand over Osama bin Laden and other high ranking al-Qaeda officials and shut down all al-Qaeda training camps within the country. In an interview with Voice of America, Omar was asked if he would give up Osama bin Laden. Omar replied, "No. We cannot do that. If we did, it means we are not Muslims, that Islam is finished. If we were afraid of attack, we could have surrendered him the last time we were threatened." Omar explained his position to high-ranking Taliban officials:

Islam says that when a Muslim asks for shelter, give the shelter and never hand him over to enemy. And our Afghan tradition says that, even if your enemy asks for shelter, forgive him and give him shelter. Osama has helped the jihad in Afghanistan, he was with us in bad days and I am not going to give him to anyone.

Omar was adamant that bin Laden was innocent of planning the 9/11 attacks despite the accusations directed against him. Nonetheless, high-ranking Taliban officials attempted to persuade Omar to hand bin Laden over and made offers to the United States through its contacts with Pakistan. The Taliban ambassador to Pakistan Abdul Salam Zaeef said at a news conference in Islamabad that "our position in this regard is that if the Americans have evidence, they should produce it." If they could prove their allegations, he said, "we are ready for a trial of Osama bin Laden." The Taliban foreign minister Wakil Ahmed Muttawakil also attempted to negotiate, offering the Americans the proposal of setting up a three-nation court under the supervision of the Organisation of the Islamic Conference as it was a "neutral organization" or having bin Laden tried by an Islamic council in Afghanistan. Muttawakil said "the US showed no interest in it." The Taliban Prime Minister Abdul Kabir stated that if evidence was provided, "we would be ready to hand him over to a third country". Part of the reluctance to hand bin Laden over stemmed from Omar's own miscalculations. Omar thought there was "less than a 10 percent" chance that the US would do anything beyond make threats.

The Supreme Council of the Islamic Clergy, a council of around 1,000 clerics, convened in Kabul in late September 2001 and issued a decree against the United States and its threats of militarily invading Afghanistan. They also recommended that Osama bin Laden be asked to leave Afghanistan of his own free will to "avoid the current tumult" and expressed sympathy and a conciliatory tone towards those who died in the 11 September attacks: "The ulema voice their sadness over American deaths and hope America does not attack Afghanistan." The Taliban Education Minister Amir Khan Muttaqi said that Omar had agreed to follow guidance offered by the clerics and would try to encourage bin Laden to leave Afghanistan without forcibly handing him over to the United States for prosecution, even if bin Laden refused to leave the country.

However, according to an interview with Pakistani journalist Rahimullah Yusufzai, Omar told him:

I don't want to go down in history as someone who betrayed his guest. I am willing to give my life, my regime. Since we have given him refuge I cannot throw him out now.

=== VOA interview (September 2001) ===
In September 2001, Omar gave a rare interview to Voice of America journalist Spozhmai Maiwandi, in which he refused to extradite Osama bin Laden, framing it as an issue of Islamic honour; accused the United States of controlling Muslim governments and thereby generating the forces now attacking it. When asked about the U.S. war on terrorism, Omar directly contrasted two promises: "I am considering two promises. One is the promise of God. The other is that of Bush. The promise of God is that my land is vast. If you start a journey on God's path, you can reside anywhere on this earth and will be protected... The promise of Bush is that there is no place on earth where you can hide that I cannot find you. We will see which one of these two promises is fulfilled." The interview was initially suppressed by the U.S. State Department, but eventually aired on 25–26 September 2001 after over 100 VOA employees protested the restriction as censorship.

=== U.S. invasion of Afghanistan ===
On the night of 7–8 October 2001, shortly after the US-led United States invasion of Afghanistan began, Omar's house in Kandahar was bombed just after he had left, fatally injuring his 10-year-old son. His stepfather, who was also his uncle, was initially reported killed, but later reports said he was injured and treated at a hospital.

In another account of an attack that night, an MQ-1 Predator drone followed a three-vehicle convoy that left Omar's compound and drove to a compound to the southwest of Kandahar, with US commanders believing Omar was in one of the vehicles. Men disembarked from the vehicles and entered a large building in the compound. US military officers considered bombing the building, but were concerned that another building in the compound might be a mosque, which they wished to avoid hitting. Eventually it was decided to fire a Hellfire missile from the Predator at one of the vehicles, where armed guards kept gathering, in the hope that it would draw out anyone inside the possible mosque. The attack — the first missile launched by a drone in combat — appeared to cause two casualties. Dozens of men, some armed, emerged from the large building and other buildings in the compound, and some got into vehicles and departed.

According to fellow Taliban fighters, Omar had secretly fled his residence in Kandahar for security purposes shortly after it was bombed and was last seen riding on the back of a motorcycle driven by his brother-in-law and right-hand man, Mullah Abdul Ghani Baradar. Senior and former Taliban officials have said that there had not been any confirmed sightings of their Amir-ul-Momineen (commander of the faithful) in Afghanistan since then.

In November 2001, he was heard over a short-wave radio ordering all Taliban troops to abandon Kabul and take to the mountains, noting, "defending the cities with front lines that can be targeted from the air will cause us terrible loss". In a November 2001 BBC Pashto interview, Omar said, "You (the BBC) and American puppet radios have created concern. But the current situation in Afghanistan is related to a bigger cause – that is the destruction of America. ... This is not a matter of weapons. We are hopeful for God's help. The real matter is the extinction of America. And, God willing, it [America] will fall to the ground." Claiming that the Americans had circulated "propaganda" that Omar had gone into hiding, Foreign Minister Wakil Ahmed Muttawakil stated that he would like to "propose that Prime Minister Blair and President Bush take Kalashnikovs and come to a specified place where Omar will also appear to see who will run and who not". He stated that Omar was merely changing locations due to security reasons.

During the Battle for Kandahar in late November 2001, US Special Operations teams known as Texas 12 and Texas 17 aligned with Hamid Karzai and with General Gul Agha Sherzai, respectively, surrounded Kandahar backed by US Marines outside Lashkar Gah. On 28 November 2001, while under attack by a Russian-made BM-21 multiple rocket launcher, Texas 17 observed Omar's black American-made Chevrolet Suburban passing Kandahar Airport and travelling down highway four surrounded by a dozen sedans and six semi-trucks. Four US Navy F-18s from USS Kitty Hawk destroyed all the vehicles including the Suburban. The same day, 28 November 2001, the Taliban reported that Omar had supposedly survived an American air strike.

== After the U.S. invasion (2001–2013) ==
=== Seclusion ===
On 5 December 2001, Omar held a meeting in Kandahar of top Taliban leaders and asked them what they wanted to do. Many were ready to stop fighting and willing to surrender. Omar handed over the Taliban leadership to his defence minister, Mullah Obaidullah, in writing. Two days later Omar left Kandahar and went into hiding in Zabul province in Afghanistan. In the following years, there was speculation about his location – with some believing that he went to Pakistan along with other Taliban leaders – and his circumstances and purported communications. But according to Bette Dam, in research published in 2019, and Borhan Osman, a senior analyst at International Crisis Group (ICG), Omar spent the rest of his life living in Zabul province. Dam said that her research relied on interviews with current and former members of the Afghan government, the Afghan intelligence agency National Directorate of Security, the Taliban, and Omar's bodyguard Jabbar Omari. She said that her findings, confirmed by Afghan officials as well as the Talibans, depicted the US intelligence failure and cast even further doubt on US claims in the Afghan war.

Omar was protected in hiding by Jabbar Omari, a former Taliban governor of Baghlan province, who was from Zabul province and, like Omar, belonged to the Hotak tribe. They spent four years living in the provincial capital Qalat at a private home owned by Abdul Samad Ustaz, Omari's former driver. Omar's wives moved to Pakistan and Omar declined when Omari offered to bring his son to visit. He had very little active involvement in the Taliban from the end of 2001. He sent a cassette tape to the rest of the Taliban leadership in Quetta in 2003, reaffirming that Obaidullah was the supreme leader and naming who should be on the leadership shura (council). The shura sent a messenger every three to seven months, when they wanted his advice on some matter. He sent at least one other cassette tape, in 2007, but stopped that practice after the messenger was briefly detained in Pakistan, and thereafter messages were just relayed person-to-person. Omar kept in touch with events in the world by listening to BBC Pashto radio. Bette Dam wrote, "Though Mullah Omar did not venture outside for fear of being caught, according to Jabbar Omari, in the four years they hid in that home, they felt relatively safe." The house was searched by the US military once, but they did not enter the concealed room where Omar was hiding.

After the US established Forward Operating Base Lagman a few hundred metres from the house in 2004, Omar relocated to a shack in a remote hamlet on the edge of a river, about 20 miles southeast of Qalat in Shinkay District, close to the Durand Line. His hideout was connected to underground irrigation channels that ran up into the hills. Soon after moving there, the US started building Forward Operating Base (FOB) Wolverine an hour's walk or about three miles away, but Omar stayed put. The FOB eventually housed about 1,000 United States troops, and sometimes other NATO troops. To avoid detection, he would occasionally hide in the underground irrigation tunnels connected to his hideout, as US planes flew over or if US or Afghan troops came to search the area. People in the village knew that Taliban personnel were living there and offered gifts of clothes and food to Omari and Omar. In 2019, the Taliban released a picture of the supposed hideout where Omar spent the last years of his life. The pictures show a modest mud house with a small garden in which Omar "used to sit in the sun", according to a Taliban spokesman.

Jabbar Omari said that Omar grew ill in 2013, refused to visit a doctor, and died of illness on 23 April. Omari and two helpers buried him that night, with Omari videoing the burial as proof. Omari went to Quetta, returning with Omar's son Yaqoob and brother Abdul Manan Omari, who had not seen him since 2001. Yaqoob insisted that the grave be opened so that he could see his father. Omari went to Quetta and met with ten senior Taliban to describe the 12 years he spent with Omar. Obaidullah had died in 2010 and Akhtar Mansour was the operational leader of the Taliban. Four religious scholars at the meeting decided that Mansour should continue as leader, but that Omar's death and Mansour's succession should not be disclosed publicly yet, while the United States was preparing to withdraw from Afghanistan. Some at the meeting unsuccessfully argued for openness. Omar's death remained a secret for two years. The Taliban were extremely successful at keeping Omar's death hidden during these two years even from highly experienced experts on the upper echelons of the Taliban. Afghanistan and Pakistan analyst Michael Semple, for example, wrote in a December 2014 report that "Mullah Omar remains the Taliban supreme leader and the source of all authority in the movement."

=== Suspected activities ===
Some believed that Omar hid in the mountains of southern Afghanistan for over a year before he fled to neighboring Pakistan in late 2002. He continued to receive the allegiance of prominent pro-Taliban military leaders in the region, including Jalaluddin Haqqani. According to sources, he lived somewhere in Karachi for a time, where he worked as a potato trader to escape detection; a city where he had lived in already and visited for many years before the group's emergence in the 1990s. The United States offered a reward of US$10 million for information leading to his capture.

In April 2004, Omar was interviewed via phone by Pakistani journalist Mohammed Shehzad. During the interview, Omar claimed that Osama bin Laden was alive and well, and that his last contact with Bin Laden was months before the interview. Omar declared that the Taliban were "hunting Americans like pigs".

In the years following the allied invasion, numerous statements were released that were identified as coming from Omar. In June 2006, a statement regarding the death of Abu Musab al-Zarqawi in Iraq was released by Omar and in it, he hailed al-Zarqawi as a martyr and claimed the resistance movements in Afghanistan and Iraq "will not be weakened". In December 2006, Omar reportedly issued a statement expressing confidence that foreign forces will be driven out of Afghanistan.

In January 2007, it was reported that Omar made his "first exchange with a journalist since he went into hiding" in 2001 with Muhammad Hanif via email and courier. In it he promised "more Afghan War", and he also said that the more than one hundred suicide bomb attacks which occurred in Afghanistan in the last year had been carried out by bombers who acted on religious orders which they received from the Taliban – "the mujahedeen do not take any action without a fatwa." In April 2007, Omar issued another statement through an intermediary in which he encouraged more suicide attacks.

In November 2009, The Washington Times claimed that Omar, assisted by Pakistan's Inter-Services Intelligence (ISI), had moved back to Karachi in October. In January 2010, Brigadier Amir Sultan Tarar, a retired officer with ISI who had previously trained Omar, said that he was ready to break with his al-Qaida allies and make peace in Afghanistan: "The moment he gets control, the first target will be the al-Qaida people."

In January 2011, The Washington Post, citing a report published by the Eclipse Group, a privately operated intelligence network that may be contracted by the CIA, stated that Omar had a heart attack on 7 January 2011. According to the report, Pakistan's ISI rushed Omar to a hospital near Karachi where he was operated on, treated, and released several days later. Pakistan's Ambassador to the US, stated that the report "had no basis whatsoever".

On 23 May 2011, TOLO News in Afghanistan quoted unnamed sources as saying that Omar had been killed by ISI two days earlier. Taliban spokesman Zabihullah Mujahid responded to the report by stating, "He is in Afghanistan safe and sound." On 20 July 2011, phone text messages which were delivered from accounts which were used by Mujahid and fellow spokesman Qari Mohammed Yousuf announced Omar's death. However, Mujahid and Yousuf quickly denied sending the messages and they claimed that their mobile phones, websites, and e-mail accounts had all been hacked, and they swore revenge on the telephone network providers. In 2012, it was revealed that an individual claiming to be Omar sent a letter to President Barack Obama in 2011, expressing slight interest in peace talks.

After Omar's confirmed death (April 2013)

On 31 May 2014, five senior Afghan detainees were released from the Guantanamo Bay detention camp in Cuba in return for the release of American prisoner of war Sergeant Bowe Bergdahl – a person claiming to be Omar reportedly hailed their release.

In December 2014, acting Afghan intelligence chief Rahmatullah Nabil stated that he was not sure "whether Omar is alive or dead". This statement was made after the Afghan intelligence agency published reports in which it revealed that fracturing was occurring within the Taliban movement, leading some reporters to speculate that a leadership struggle had ensued because Omar had died. Later reports which were released by Afghan intelligence in December said that Omar had been hiding in Karachi. An anonymous European intelligence official stated that "there's a consensus among all three branches of the Afghan security forces that Omar is alive. Not only do they think he's alive, they say they have a good understanding of where exactly he is in Karachi."

In April 2015, a man who claimed to be Mullah Omar issued a fatwa which decreed that pledges of allegiance to the Islamic State of Iraq and the Levant (ISIS) are forbidden by Islamic law. The man described ISIS leader Abu Bakr al-Baghdadi as a "fake caliph", and he also said that "Baghdadi just wanted to dominate what has so far been achieved by the real jihadists of Islam after three decades of jihad. A pledge of allegiance to him is 'haram'."

=== 2015 announcement of his death ===
On 29 July 2015, Abdul Hassib Seddiqi, the spokesman for Afghanistan's National Directorate of Security, said "officially" that Mohammed Omar had died at a hospital in Karachi, Pakistan, in April 2013, and the office of Afghan President Ashraf Ghani confirmed that information on his death was "credible". Pakistani newspaper The Express Tribune reported that a former Taliban minister and current leadership council member, who spoke anonymously, said Omar died from tuberculosis.

The following day, the Taliban confirmed that he was dead, but denied that he died in Pakistan. Other Taliban members stated that his death occurred in Afghanistan (in the area of Taizeni according to Mete Sohtaoğlu). According to an official statement by Pakistani defence minister Khawaja Asif, "Mullah Omar neither died nor was buried in Pakistan and his sons' statements are on record to support this. Whether he died now or two years ago is another controversy which we do not wish to be a part of. He was neither in Karachi nor in Quetta."

Afghan officials report that Omar was buried in Zabul province, a province in southern Afghanistan. Atta Mohammed Haqyar, head of Zabul's provincial council, believed that Omar was buried in a cemetery in Sarkhogan area of Shinkay district in Zabul province. Several senior Taliban commanders have also been buried in Sarkhogan area. He further stated that the area had special significance for the Hotak tribe which Omar was from.

Sources close to the Taliban leadership said his deputy, Akhtar Mansur, would replace him, although with the lesser title of Supreme Leader. It was confirmed by a senior Taliban member that Omar's death was kept a secret for two years.

Fidai Mahaz, a Taliban splinter group, claimed that Omar did not die of natural causes; rather he was killed in his hideout in Zabul province.

Many Islamist and jihadist movements expressed condolences following Omar's death, including Ajnad al-Kavkaz, Ansar Al-Furqan, Islamic Front's Ahrar al-Sham, Jaish Muhammad, Ansar al-Din Front, Turkistan Islamic Party, Jamaat Ansar al-Sunna, Jaish al Ummah, Jamaat-ul-Ahrar, Caucasus Emirate, Jaish al-Islam, Al-Nusra Front, AQAP, AQIM, and Al-Shabaab.

Conversely, the Afghan government was unsympathetic to mourning his death; security forces were ordered to prevent citizens from publicly grieving Omar. A National Directorate of Security (NDS) spokesman said that Omar was "the biggest cause of war and backwardness in the modern history of Afghanistan", adding that any ceremony for Omar would be an "insult" to victims of the Taliban. Meanwhile, thousands of Afghans nationwide took part in rallies on 4 August, denouncing Omar.

After his death, the Taliban regained control of Afghanistan as the Second Islamic Emirate following the Fall of Kabul during the Taliban offensive. During this time the location of Mullah Omar's fenced grave was indirectly revealed. The grave is situated in the Suri district of Zabul Province.

== Personal life ==
Despite his political rank and his high status on the Rewards for Justice most wanted list, not much was publicly known about Omar. Omar made only one public speech and always refused to meet foreigners; Before his death, only one confirmed photograph was known to exist of him. After his death, the Taliban released a newer and clearer photo showing Omar in his youth in 1978.

Accounts of his physical appearance state that Omar was thin, strongly built and very tall, at around 1.98 m (6 ft 6 in). Omar was described as shy and taciturn, by – for example – the famed Afghan poet Abdul Bari Jahani, who visited him with academics and activists at the beginning of his rule. The members of this group applauded the order and security he brought to the country, and Jahani remembers him as a "tall and handsome" man who "listened in quiet." Zaeef said "he listened, he was patient, and he did not react in anger." Conversely, a former Saudi intelligence chief said Omar was "extremely nervous, perspired, and even screamed at me." Senior Taliban leaders claimed he would "stumble over his native tongue in the interviews he occasionally gave the BBC Pashto service." He had "at least" three wives and "at least" five or six children, including Mullah Yaqoob, the current acting Defence Minister of Afghanistan.

Omar refused to and never made a pilgrimage to Mecca, despite receiving a personal invitation from King Fahd of Saudi Arabia to do so in 1998.

== Writings ==
Omar wrote biannual essays towards the end of his life.

== Notes ==
Political offices
New office	1st Supreme Leader of the Islamic Emirate of Afghanistan; 1996–2013	Succeeded by Akhtar Mansur
Preceded by Burhanuddin Rabbani as President	— DISPUTED — Head of state of Afghanistan; 1996–2001; Disputed by Burhanuddin Rabbani (as President); Reason for dispute: Afghan Civil War (1996–2001)	Succeeded by Burhanuddin Rabbani as President
