= 215 Azam Corps =

- Pashto: ۲۱۵ عزم قول اردو
- Founded: October 2021
- Country: Afghanistan
- Allegiance: Islamic Emirate of Afghanistan
- Branch: Afghan Army
- Type: Corps
- Nickname: Azam
- Engagements: 2021 Afghanistan–Iran clashes
- Website: Official Twitter

Commanders
- Chief of Staff: Maulvi Abdul Aziz "Ansari"
- Commander: Sharafuddin Taqi
- Deputy Commander: Mohibullah Nusrat

The 215 Azam Corps is one of the eight corps of the Islamic Emirate Army established in October 2021 and headquartered in Helmand. The current Chief of Staff is Maulvi Abdul Aziz "Ansari". The Islamic Republic of Afghanistan-era corps it replaced was known as the 215th 'Maiwand' Corps and was a part of Afghan National Army.

== Command Staff ==
Chiefs of Staff
Chief of Staff	Period	Notes	Ref(s)
Mohammad Khan Dawat	4 October 2021 – 6 December 2021		
Maulvi Abdul Aziz "Ansari"	7 December 2021 – Present		
Commanders
Commander	Period	Notes	Ref(s)
Sharafuddin Taqi	4 October 2021 – Present		
Deputy Commanders
Deputy Commander	Period	Notes	Ref(s)
Mohibullah Nusrat	4 October 2021 – Present		
Maulvi Abdul Samad	23 November 2021 – Present		

== 215th 'Maiwand' Corps ==
215th Corps
- Active: December 2009–14 August 2021
- Country: Afghanistan
- Branch: Afghan National Army
- Type: Corps
- Size: 18,000 (2015)
- Headquarters: Lashkargah, Helmand Province
- Engagements: War in Afghanistan (2001–2021)

Commanders
- Last commander: General Sami Sadat

The 215th 'Maiwand' Corps was one of the Corps of the Afghan National Army. Its headquarters was at Lashkargah, Helmand province. The Corps was established in 2009 and had strength of around 18,000 soldiers in 2015. The Corps was responsible for the security of south-western part of Afghanistan (Helmand province and Nimruz province). In 2015, the Corps was described as one of the weakest Corps among the six Afghan National Army Corps. One of the reasons cited for the 215th Corps weak performance compared to other corps was the inexperience of the corps commander.

General Sami Sadat was appointed as the commander of the Corps in late November/December 2020. He commanded the Corps during the 2021 Taliban offensive and was later appointed as the commander of Afghan National Army Special Operations Command (ANASOC) on 11 August. No one is reported to have been appointed as the commander of the 215th Corps after Sadat's transfer and the Corps eventually surrendered in Battle of Lashkargah on 13 August 2021.

=== Formations ===
Under the Islamic Republic from 2010-2015, its subordinate formations included:

- 1st Brigade and Headquarters at Camp Garmsir (very close to Camp Dwyer)
  - Commanded by Brigadier General Mohammad Shujaee during 2011
- 2nd Brigade at Sangin
- 3rd Brigade at Camp Shorabak
- 4th Brigade at FOB Delaram
- 215th Engineering Kandak

=== Former commanders of 215th Corps ===
- General Sayed Mallok (or Malouk) (2010-2014)
- Brigadier General Dadan Lawang (2014-)
- Brigadier General Wali Mohammad Ahmadzai (2017)
- General Sami Sadat (July 2017-August 2021)
