= Afghan Army =

Land service branch of the Afghan military

Islamic Army of Afghanistan
- د افغانستان اسلامي اردو (Pashto) اردو اسلامی افغانستان (Dari)
- The emblem of the Islamic Emirate of Afghanistan serves as the badge for all branches of the armed forces
- Founded: c. 1586; 2021 (current form)
- Country: Afghanistan
- Type: Army
- Role: Land warfare
- Part of: Afghan Armed Forces
- Headquarters: Kabul, Afghanistan
- Motto: "Allahu Akbar" (God is Greatest)

Commanders
- Army Chief: Fasihuddin Fitrat (from 2021)

Insignia
- Flag

The Islamic Army of Afghanistan, (Note: Dari: اردو ملی اسلامی افغانستان, romanized: Urdu-yi Millī-yi Islāmī-yi Afghānistān; Pashto: د افغانستان اسلامي ملي اردو, romanized: Də Afghānistān Islāmī Millī Urdu,) also referred to as the Islamic Emirate of Afghanistan Army, and simply as the Afghan Army, is the land force branch of the Afghan Armed Forces. The roots of an army in Afghanistan can be traced back to the early 18th century when the Hotak dynasty was established in Kandahar followed by Ahmad Shah Durrani's rise to power. It was reorganized in 1880 during Emir Abdur Rahman Khan's reign. Afghanistan remained neutral during the First and Second World Wars. From the 1960s to the early 1990s, the Afghan Army was equipped by the Soviet Union.

After the resignation of President Mohammad Najibullah in 1992, the army effectively dissolved. In 1996 the Islamic Emirate of Afghanistan (Taliban regime) took power, creating their own army, which lasted until the United States invasion of Afghanistan in October–November 2001.

In mid-2001, with the Taliban dispersed, the British and the United States began creating a new Afghan National Army (ANA). By 2013, the Afghan government transferred security responsibilities from NATO to the ANA. However, over the next several years the government slowly lost territory to the Taliban, and eventually collapsed, with Kabul falling to the Taliban in 2021. The majority of training of the ANA was undertaken in the Kabul Military Training Centre. In 2019, the ANA had approximately 180,000 soldiers out of an authorized strength of 195,000. Despite its significant manpower on paper, in reality a significant portion of the Afghan National Army manpower were made up of ghost soldiers.

Following the withdrawal of U.S. and allied troops from Afghanistan in the summer of 2021, in the face of a rapid Taliban offensive, the Afghan National Army largely disintegrated. Following the escape of President Ashraf Ghani and the fall of Kabul, remaining ANA soldiers either deserted their posts or surrendered to the Taliban. Some ANA remnants reportedly joined the anti-Taliban National Resistance Front of Afghanistan in the Panjshir Valley (see Republican insurgency in Afghanistan). The Islamic Emirate of Afghanistan Army is currently led by Fasihuddin Fitrat.

== History ==
=== The Royal Afghan Army ===
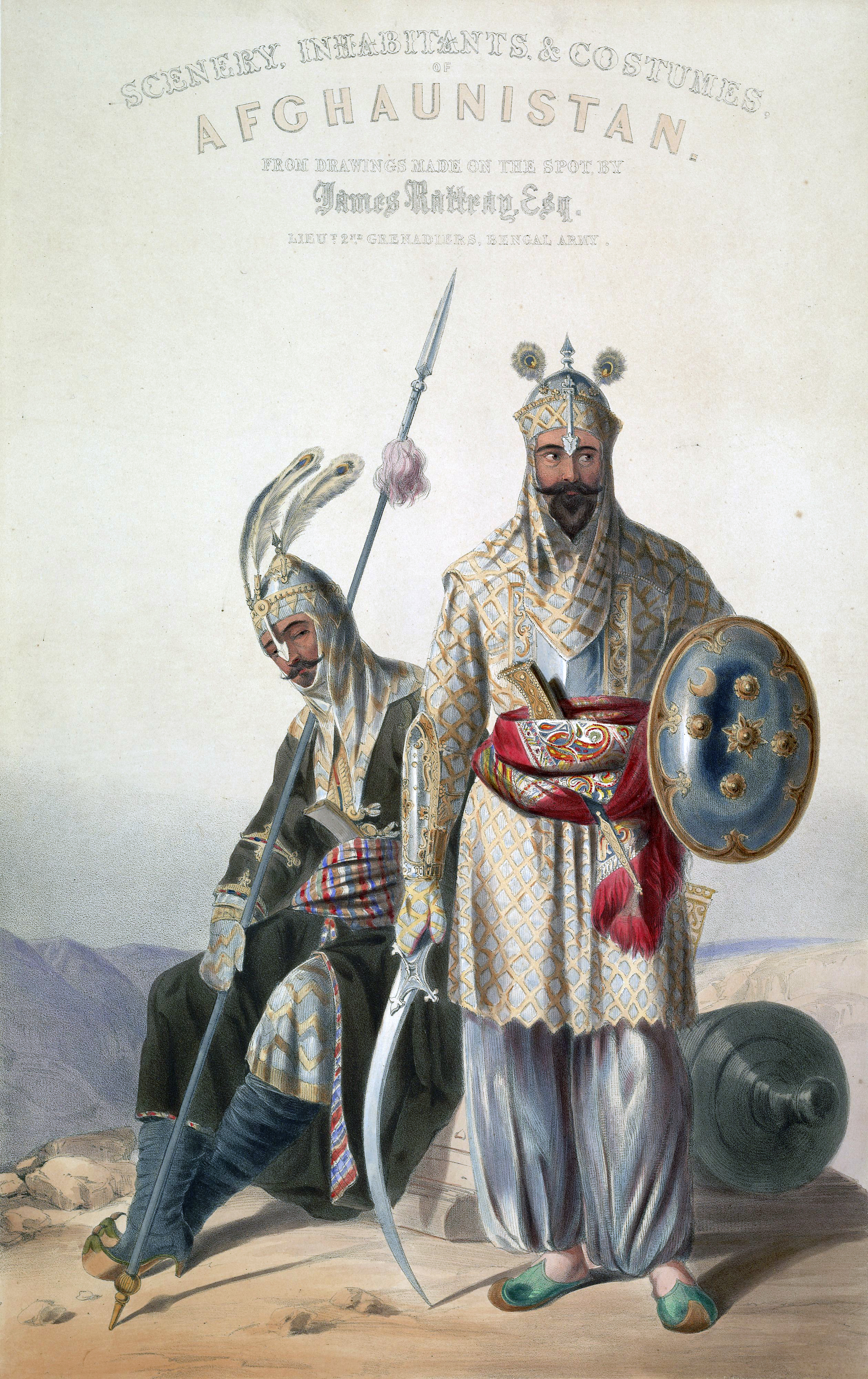
Afghan royal soldiers of the Durrani Empire

Historically, Afghans have served in the army of the Ghaznavids (963–c.1187), Ghurids (1148–1215), Delhi Sultanate (1206–1527), and the Mughals (1526–1858). The Afghan Army traces its origin to the early 18th century when the Hotak dynasty rose to power in Kandahar and defeated the Persian Safavid Empire at the Battle of Gulnabad in 1722.

When Ahmad Shah Durrani formed the Durrani Empire in 1747, in general, tribes were responsible for providing troops to the king. The only national army that existed during Ahmad Shah's time consisted of small groups that functioned as royal bodyguards. The Afghan Army fought a number of battles in the Punjab region of India during the 19th century. One of the famous battles was the 1761 Battle of Panipat in which the Afghan army decisively defeated the Hindu Maratha Empire. The Afghans then fought with the Sikh Empire, until finally, the Sikh Marshal Hari Singh Nalwa died and Sikh conquests stopped. In 1839, the British successfully invaded Afghanistan and installed the exiled Shah Shujah Durrani into power. Their occupation of Afghanistan was challenged after Dost Mohammad's son, Wazir Akbar Khan and the forces he led revolted against the occupying British. By October 1841 disaffected Afghan tribes were flocking to the support of Wazir Akbar Khan in Bamian. The success of Akbar Khan's uprising led to the 1842 retreat from Kabul where the Afghan army decimated British forces, thanks to effective use of the rugged terrain and weapons such as the Jezail.

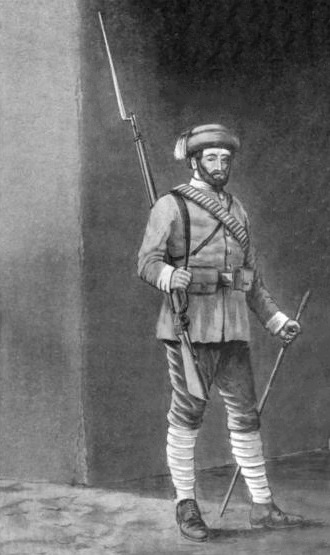
Afghan infantry soldier in 1890

At the outbreak of the Second Anglo-Afghan War (1878–80), Ali Ahmad Jalali cites sources saying that the regular army was about 50,000 strong and consisted of 62 infantry and 16 cavalry regiments, with 324 guns mostly organized in horse and mountain artillery batteries. Jalali writes that '..although Amir Shir Ali Khan (1863–78) is widely credited for founding the modern Afghan Army, it was only under Abdur Rahman that it became a viable and effective institution.' The Library of Congress Country Study for Afghanistan states that when Abdur Rahman came to the throne circa 1880:

"..the army was virtually nonexistent. With the assistance of a liberal financial loan from the British, plus their aid in the form of weapons, ammunition, and other military supplies, [Abdur Rahman] began a 20-year task of creating a respectable regular force by instituting measures that formed the long-term basis of the military system. These included increasing the equalization of military obligation by setting up a system known as the hasht nafari (whereby one man in every eight between the ages of 20 and 40 took his turn at military service); constructing an arsenal in Kabul to reduce dependence on foreign sources for small arms and other ordnance; introducing supervised training courses; organizing troops into divisions, brigades, and regiments, including battalions of artillery; developing pay schedules; and introducing an elementary (and harsh) disciplinary system.

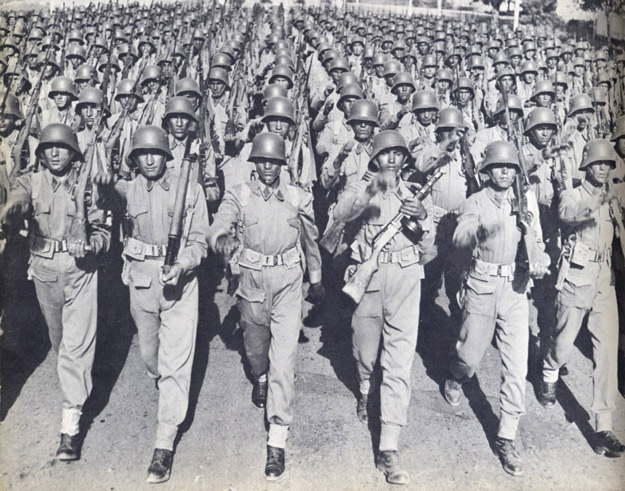
Afghan Army soldiers in the 1950s, wearing the iconic Stahlhelm

Further improvements to the Army were made by King Amanullah Khan in the early 20th century just before the Third Anglo-Afghan War. King Amanullah fought against the British in 1919, resulting in Afghanistan becoming fully independent after the Treaty of Rawalpindi was signed. It appears from reports of Naib Sular Abdur Rahim's career that a Cavalry Division was in existence in the 1920s, with him being posted to the division in Herat Province in 1913 and Mazar-i-Sharif after 1927. A military academy was in existence by Amanullah's reign. The Army fought the Soviet Union in the Urtatagai conflict (1925–1926) over a border island, following earlier fighting in 1913. In 1927 Afghanistan invited Turkey to send a military advisory mission, resulting in a strengthening of Afghan divisions and brigades, "augmenting each echelon headquarters with supporting staff;" and "regularizing the officer corps". The Afghan Army was expanded during King Zahir Shah's reign, starting in 1933. In 1934, soldiers of the Royal Afghan Army were also taught the Japanese martial art of Jujutsu by His Excellency Abdullah Khan, at the royal army school.

From 1949–1950 to 1961, Afghanistan-Pakistan skirmishes took place along the frontier, culminating in fighting in Bajaur Agency in September 1960. This led to a breakoff in diplomatic relations between the two countries in September 1961.

In 1953, Lieutenant General Mohammed Daoud Khan, cousin of the King who had previously served as Minister of Defence, was transferred from command of the Central Corps in Kabul to become Prime Minister of Afghanistan. The Central Corps was headquartered at Amanullah's Darulaman Palace. On the opening day of Parliament in October 1965, a violent student demonstration among which Babrak Karmal was at the forefront forced Zahir Shah's new prime minister Yousef to resign. Two students were killed when the new corps commander, General Abdul Wali, sent in troops to restore order.

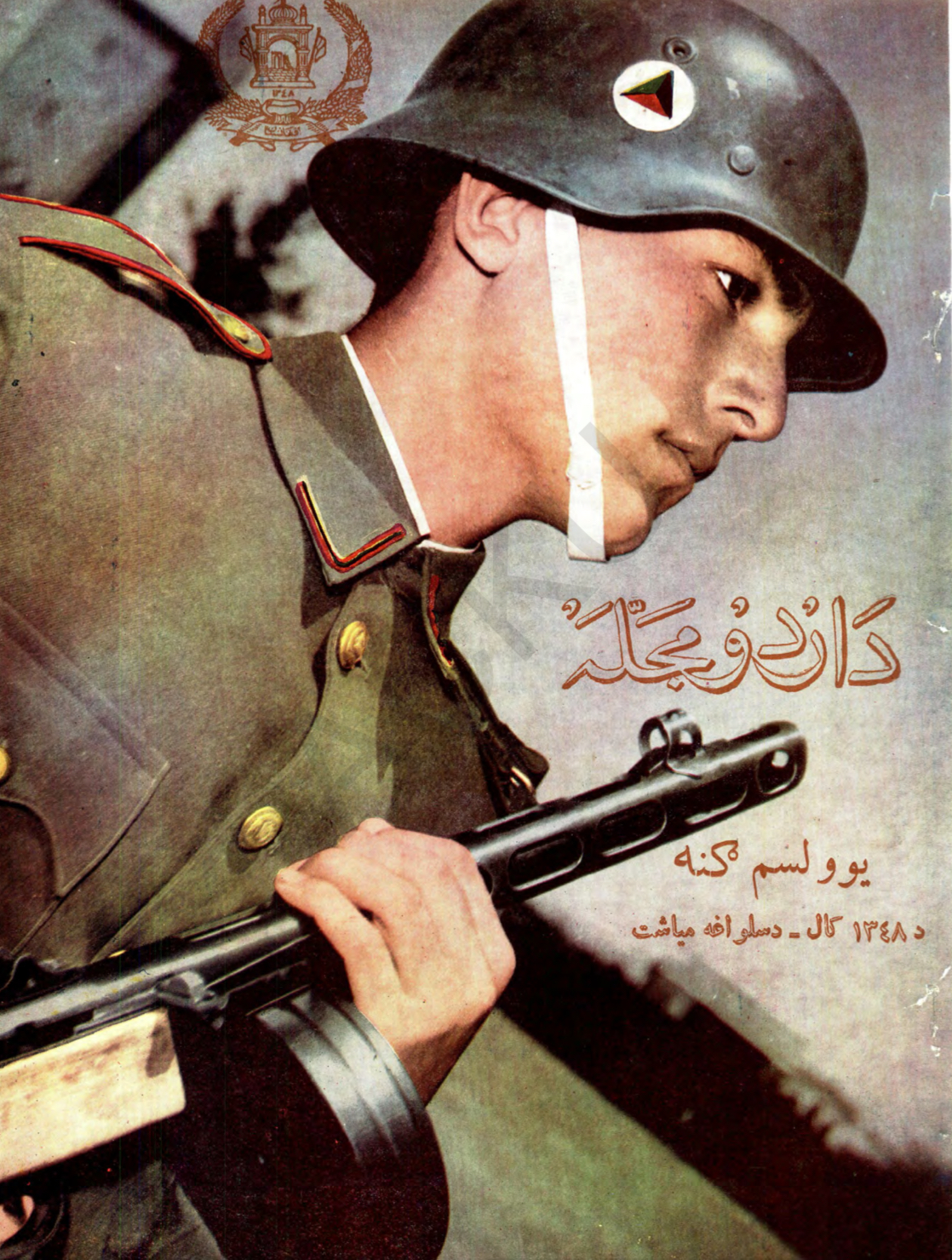
Royal Afghan Army soldier poses for the cover of a magazine in 1969

From the 1960s to the early 1990s, the Afghan Army received training and equipment mostly from the Soviet Union. More specifically, a $100,000,000 contract was awarded to Afghanistan which led to the Afghan Army being transformed, due to the arrival and new weaponry and armour in 1958. Prime Minister Mohammad Daoud Khan, now emboldened by Soviet support, began making changes to the Afghan Army's formations. The name of the Ministry of War was changed to the Ministry of Defence, with the Chief of Staff being given greater managerial and administrative powers. The most significant change included the addition of readiness categories known as "Type A" and "Type B". The former being used to refer to units that were fully operational and combat-ready at all times, with complete personnel, full weaponry and combat equipment, and an active logistics system. Type B, on the other hand, was used to refer to units that weren't fully active or operational during peacetime, being used for administration, training and as strategic reserve forces.

The 1st Central Army Corps' divisions were all "Type A", such as the 7th, 8th and 11th Infantry Divisions. The 2nd Army Corps (Kandahar) was "Type B", with only one operational unit known as the 100th Division, with two other unnamed divisions being used as reserves. The divisions of the 3rd Army Corps (Paktia) were all "Type B", such as the 12th, 14th and 35th Infantry Divisions. Under the premiership of Daoud Khan, the personnel of the Afghan Army increased to 80,000, with "Type B" units being able to be deployed within 72 hours and act as "Type A" units.

The Royal Afghan Army were photographed wearing white "snegurochka" winter suits in snowy areas of the country and also had armored riverboats in their inventory, as seen in a parade in Kabul. In February–March 1957, the first group of Soviet military specialists (about 10, including interpreters) was sent to Kabul to train Afghan officers and non-commissioned officers. At the time, there seems to have been significant Turkish influence in the Afghan Armed Forces, which waned quickly after the Soviet advisors arrived. By the late 1950s, Azimi describes three corps, each with a number of divisions, along the eastern border with Pakistan and several independent divisions.

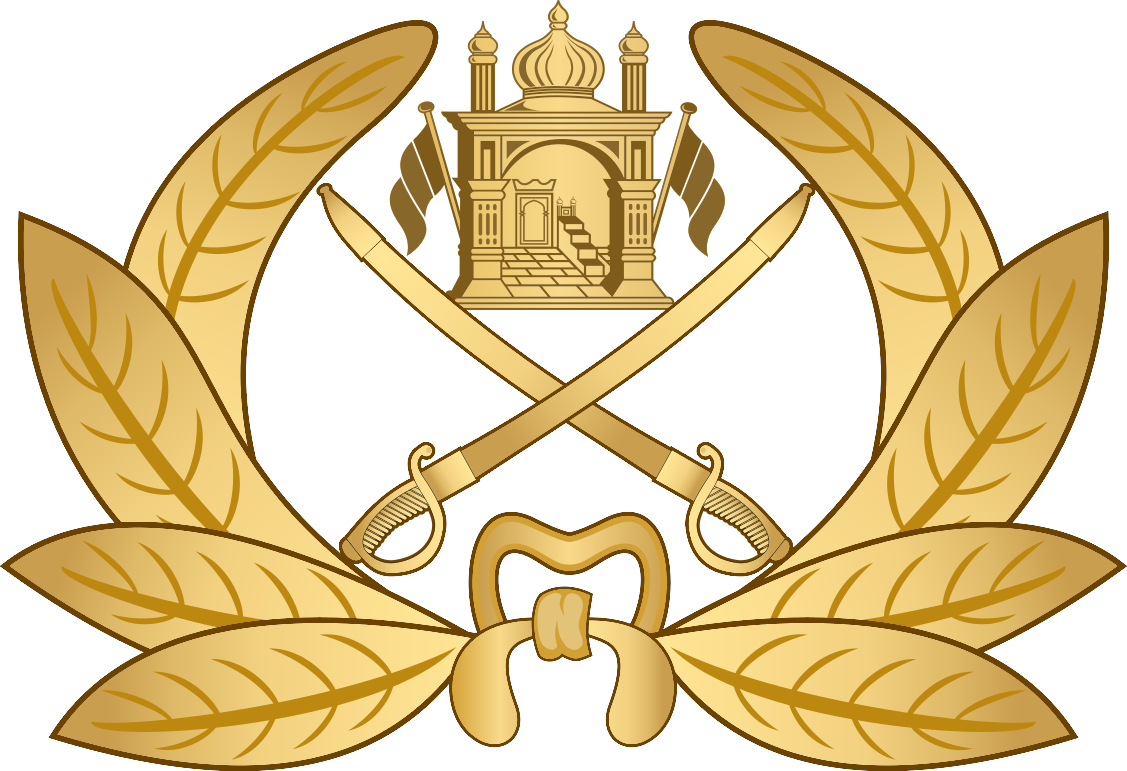
The military emblem of the Royal Afghan Army from 1961–1974

In a 1961 manual titled "Royalist Regulations" for the Royal Afghan Army, there were illustrations of numerous branch insignias, denoting the specialities and the role of the soldier wearing them. These include:

- "Academy" (اکادمی), worn by recruits who were still in a military academy
- "Infantry" (پیاده), the most common insignia, worn by most soldiers who have finished training and graduated from the academy
- "Cavalry" (سواری), worn by the Royal Afghan Army's cavalrymen on horseback
- "Artillery" (طومي), worn by artillery men
- "Tank"(تانک), worn by tank operators of the Royal Afghan Army's tank brigades
- "Fortification" (استحكام), worn by soldiers involved in the construction of defensive structures
- "Communications" (مخابره), worn by soldiers part of the army's signal regiments
- "Gendarmerie" (شاندارم), worn by the paramilitary police force
- "Vehicle" (نقلیه) worn by motorized/mechanized units
- "Logistics" (لفوازير), worn by units specializing in transportation and supply
- "Cartography" (خریطہ), worn by soldiers specializing in map-making and mapping
- "Judicial" (قضا), worn by members of the military court
- "Field Medic" (صحید), worn by soldiers who are qualified medics
- "Subfield Medic" ( پرسونال فرعی صحید), worn by soldiers who distributed medicine
- "Veterinary" (وترین), worn by veterinarians who specialized in animal care
- "Minor Personnel" (پرسونال فرعی و ریز), worn by support staff and soldiers with specialized technical skills
- "Instructor" (معلم), worn by personnel responsible for training recruits
- "Chemical Warfare" (کیمیای عربی), worn by units that specialize in the use of chemical agents
- "Engineer" (انجنیر), worn by soldiers who specialize in engineering
- "Ordnance" (وسله پالی), worn by soldiers managing equipment such as weapons, bombs and ammunition
- "Finance" (مالی), worn by the army's accountants who manage finances and budgeting
- "Music" (موزیک), worn by the military band of the Royal Afghan Army

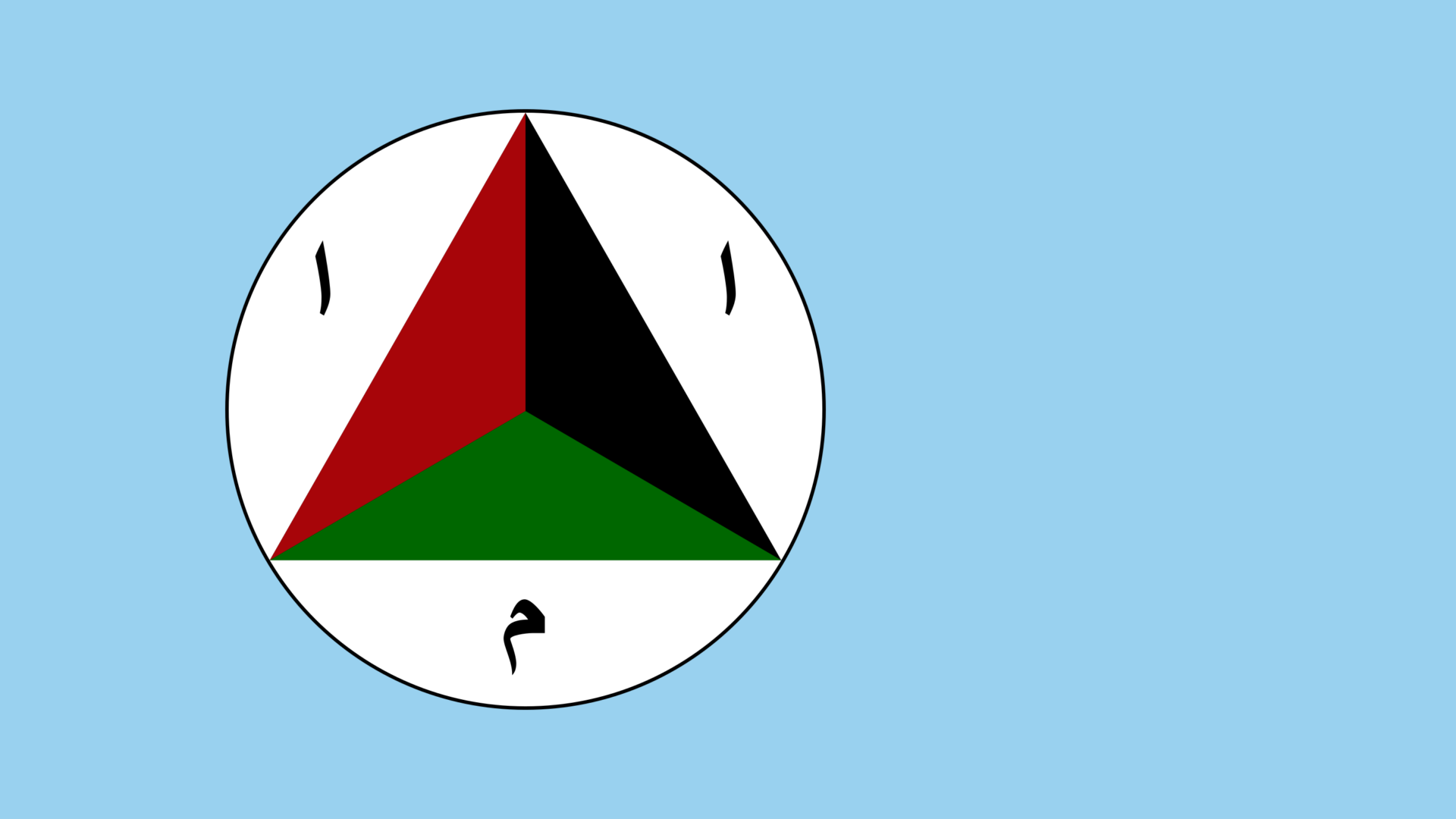
The flag of the Royal Afghan Army's military band under the Kingdom of Afghanistan

In the early 1970s, Soviet military assistance was increased. The number of Soviet military specialists increased from 1,500 in 1973 to 5,000 by April 1978. The senior Soviet specialist at this time (from 29 November 1972 until 11 December 1975) was a Major General I.S. Bondarets (И.С. Бондарец), and from 1975 to 1978, the senior Soviet military adviser was Major General L.N. Gorelov. Before the Saur Revolution in 1978, according to Jacobs, the army included three armored divisions; infantry divisions averaging 4,500 to 8,000 men each; "two mountain infantry brigades, one artillery brigade, a guards regiment (for palace protection), three artillery regiments, two commando regiments, and a parachute battalion, which was largely grounded. All the formations were under the control of three corps level headquarters. All but three infantry divisions were facing Pakistan along a line from Bagram south to Kandahar." The guards regiment additionally performed ceremonial duties. There were 570 medium tanks, plus more Soviet T-55 tanks on order. The Afghan Army was also referred to as the Afghan Republican Army, or simply the "Republican Army", in a Kabul Times newspaper, a few days after the 1973 Afghan coup d'état.

=== Socialist Afghanistan ===
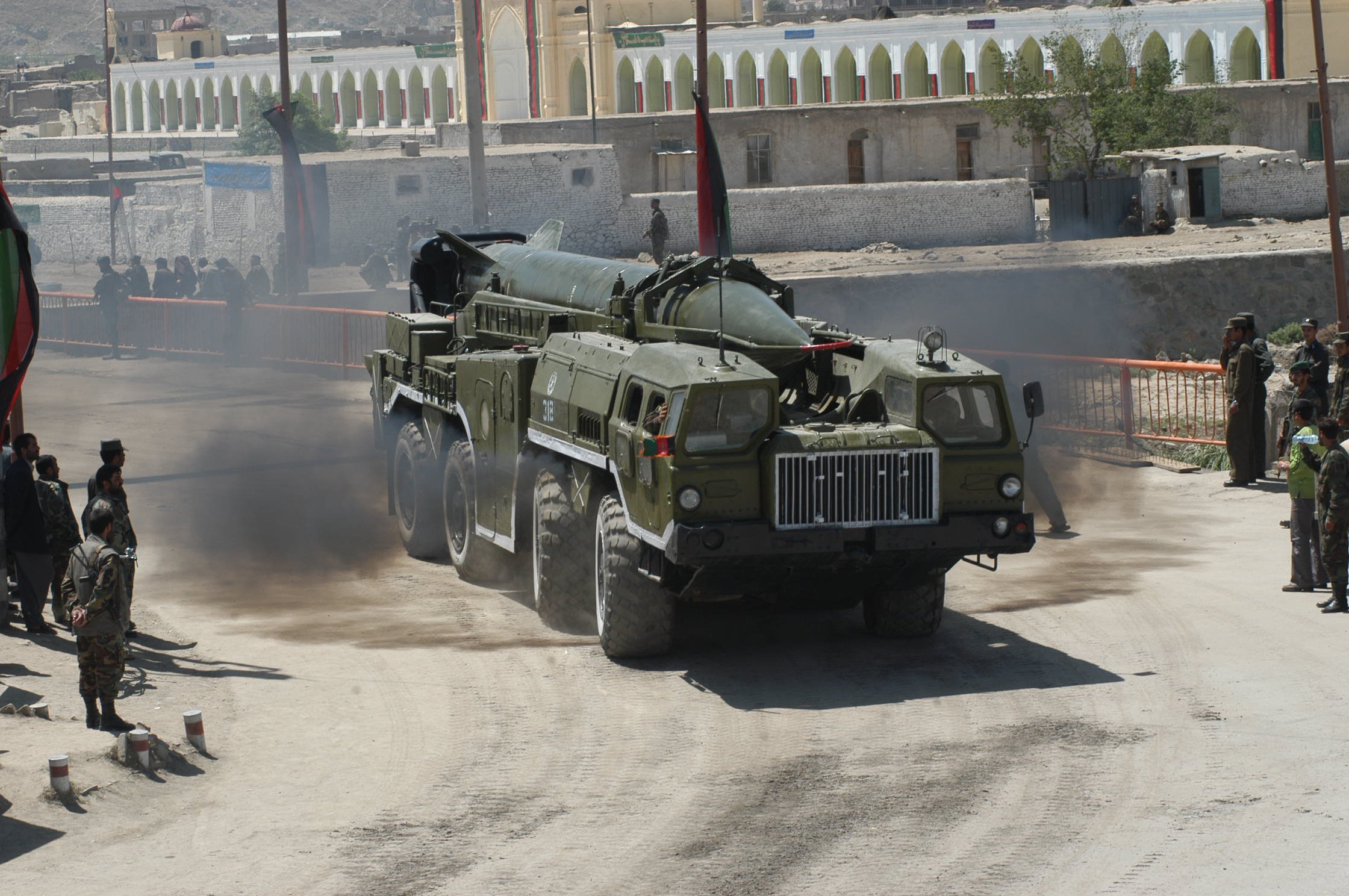
In 1989, the Soviet Union transferred numbers of Scud missiles, a tactical ballistic missile, as seen in the footage in 2004.

On 27 April 1978 the People's Democratic Party of Afghanistan, led by Nur Mohammad Taraki, Babrak Karmal and Amin overthrew the regime of Mohammad Daoud, who was killed the next day, along with most of his family. On 1 May, Taraki became President, Prime Minister and General Secretary of the PDPA. The country was then renamed the Democratic Republic of Afghanistan (DRA), and the PDPA government lasted until April 1992.

In 1980, under President Babrak Karmal, the Ministry of Defense drafted plans to form three Spetsnaz battalions for each of the army corps. A year later, in 1981, the 203rd Separate Spetsnaz Battalion was formed (alongside the 212th, 230th and 211th) under the 1st Central Army Corps in Kabul and subordinated to KhAD-e Nezami (military intelligence). The 203rd Battalion reportedly worked alongside the Spetsnaz GRU and the Soviet Border Troops, as well as with the Soviet Airborne Forces.

The army lost much of its strength during the early stages of PDPA rule. One of the main reasons for the small size was that the Soviet military were afraid the Afghan army would defect en masse to the enemy if total personnel increased. There were several sympathisers of the mujahideen within the military. Even so, there were several elite units under the command of the Afghan army, for instance, the 26th Airborne Battalion, 444th, 37th and 38th Commando Brigades, all part of the Afghan Commando Forces. The 26th Airborne Battalion proved politically unreliable, and in 1979, they revolted against the PDPA government. As a result, the 26th Airborne Battalion was reformed and turned into the 37th Commando Battalion. In the same year, the 81st Artillery Regiment were given airborne training and converted into the 38th Commando Battalion. The Commando Brigades were, in contrast, considered reliable and were used as mobile strike forces until they sustained excessive casualties. Insurgents ambushed and inflicted heavy casualties on the 38th Commando Brigade during the Second Battle of Zhawar in Paktika Province in May 1983. After sustaining heavy casualties the commando brigades were turned into battalions.

Most soldiers were recruited for a three-year term, later extended to four-year terms in 1984.

The Afghan Army 1978

- Central Corps (Kabul)
  - 7th Division (Kabul)
  - 8th Division (Kabul)
  - 4th and 15th Armoured Brigades
  - Republican Guard Brigade
- 2nd Corps (Kandahar)
  - 7th Armoured Brigade
  - 15th Division (Kandahar)
- 3rd Corps (Gardez)
- 9th Division (Chugha-Serai)
- 11th Division (Jalalabad)
- 12th Division (Gardez)
- 14th Division (Ghazni)
- 17th Division (Herat)
- 18th Division (Mazar-i-Sharif)
- 20th Division (Nahrin)
- 25th Division (Khost)

After the PDPA seizure of power, desertions swept the force, affecting the loyalty and moral values of soldiers. There were purges on patriotic junior and senior officers, and upper class Afghan aristocrats in society. On 15 March 1979, the Herat uprising broke out. The 17th Division was detailed by the regime to put down the rebellion, but this proved a mistake, as there were few Khalqi faction soldiers in the division and instead it mutinied and joined the uprising. Forces from Kabul had to be dispatched to suppress the rebellion.

Gradually the Army's three armoured divisions and now sixteen infantry divisions dropped in size to on average around 2,500 strong, quarter strength, by 1985. One of the first series of defections occurred in the 9th Division, which, Urban wrote, defected by brigades in response to the Soviet intervention. It lost its 5th Brigade at Asmar in August 1979 and its 30th Mountain Brigade in 1980. After Soviet advisors arrived in 1977, they inspired a number of adaptations and reorganisations. In April 1982, the 7th Division was moved from the capital. The division, which was commanded by Khalqi Major General Zia-Ud-Din, had its depleted combat resources spread out along the Kabul-Kandahar highway. In 1984–1985, all infantry divisions were restructured to a common design. In 1985 Army units were relieved of security duties, making more available for combat operations.

Emblem of the Afghan Army from 1980 until 1987

During the 1980s Soviet–Afghan War, the Army fought against the mujahideen rebel groups. Deserters or defectors became a severe problem. The Afghan Army's casualties were as high as 50–60,000 soldiers and another 50,000 soldiers deserted the Army. The Afghan Army's defection rate was about 10,000 soldiers per year between 1980 and 1989; the average deserters left the Afghan Army after the first five months.

Local militias were also important to the Najibullah regime's security efforts. From 1988 several new divisions were formed from former Regional Forces/militias' formations: the 53rd Infantry Division – the "Jowzyani militia" of Abdul Rashid Dostum raised from Sheberghan, the 55th, 80th, 93rd, 94th, 95th, and 96th, plus, possibly, a division in Lashkar Gah.

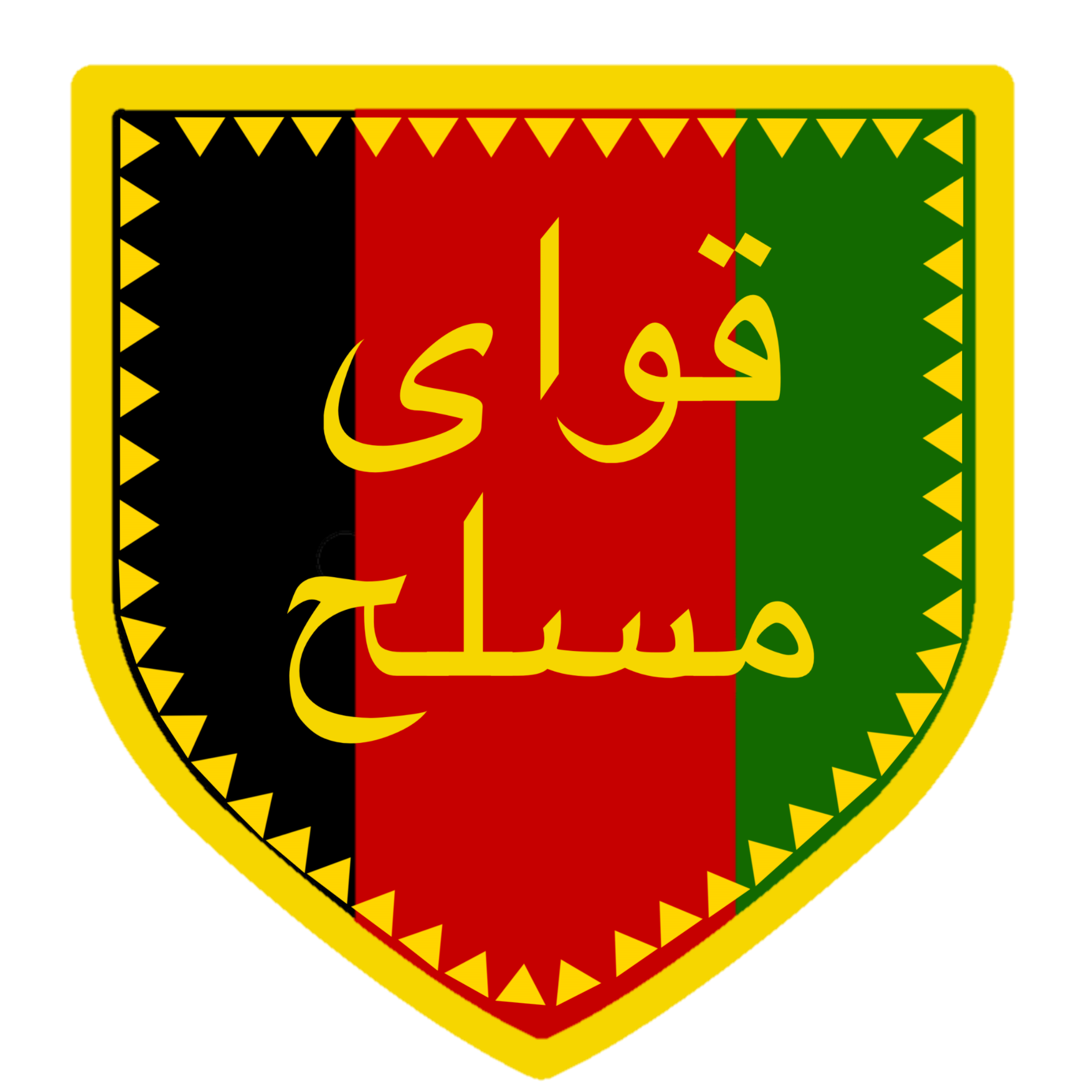
The shoulder patch worn by Afghan National Army soldiers under the Democratic Republic of Afghanistan

As compensation for the withdrawal of Soviet troops in 1989, the USSR agreed to deliver sophisticated weapons to the government, among which were large quantities of Scud surface-to-surface missiles. The first 500 were transferred during the early months of 1989, and soon proved to be extremely useful, a critical asset. During the mujahideen attack against Jalalabad, between March and June 1989, three firing batteries manned by Afghan crews advised by Soviets fired approximately 438 missiles. Soon Scuds were in use in all the heavily contested areas of Afghanistan. After January 1992, the Soviet advisors were withdrawn, reducing the Afghan Army's ability to use their ballistic missiles. On 24 April 1992, the mujahideen forces of Ahmad Shah Massoud (Jamiat-e Islami) captured the main Scud stockpile at Afshar, Kabul, belonging to the 99th Missile Brigade. Shia Hazara groups, such as Harakat-e Islami, additionally gained Scud missile launchers. As the government collapsed, the few remaining Scuds and their transporter erector launchers were divided among the rival factions fighting for power. However, the missile operators managed to successfully flee and a lack of trained personnel prevented a sustained use of such weapons, and, between April 1992 and 1996, only 44 Scuds were fired in Afghanistan.

=== 1992 and after ===
In spring 1992, the Afghan Army consisted of five corps – 1st Corps at Jalalabad, 2nd at Kandahar, 3rd Corps at Gardez, 4th Corps at Herat, and 6th Corps at Kunduz – as well as five smaller operations groups, including one at Charikar, which had been 5th Corps until it was reduced in status. 1st, 2nd, and 3rd Corps, and the operations groups at Sarobi and Khost, nearly completely disintegrated in 1992. Formations in and around Kabul joined different mujahideen militias while forces in the north and west remained intact for a longer period. Forces in the north and west were taken over by three major commanders: Ismael Khan, Ahmed Shah Masoud, and Abdul Rashid Dostam.

On 18 April 1992, the PDPA garrison at Kunduz surrendered to local mujahideen commanders. The 54th Division base at Kunduz was handed over to the overall military leader of Ittehad in the area, Amir Chughay. Dostum and commanders loyal to him formed Junbesh I-Melli, the National Islamic Movement of Afghanistan. The NIM grouped the former regime's 18th, 20th, 53rd, 54th, and 80th Divisions, plus several brigades. By mid-1994 there were two parallel 6th Corps operating in the north. Dostum's 6th Corps was based at Pul-i-Khumri and had three divisions. The Defence Ministry of the Kabul government's 6th Corps was based at Kunduz and also had three divisions, two sharing numbers with formations in Dostum's corps. By 1995 Masoud controlled three corps commands: the Central Corps at Kabul, the best organised with a strength of 15–20,000, the 5th Corps at Herat covering the west, and the 6th Corps at Kunduz covering the northeast.

By 1996 the Taliban Islamic Emirate of Afghanistan seized the country, aiming to control it by Islamic Sharia law. The Taliban's army and commanders placed emphasis on simplicity; some were secretly trained by the Pakistan Inter-Services Intelligence and Pakistani Armed Forces around the Durand Line. After the removal of the Taliban government through the United States invasion of Afghanistan in late 2001, private armies loyal to warlords gained more and more influence. In mid-2001, Ali Ahmed Jalali wrote:

The army (as a state institution, organized, armed, and commanded by the state) does not exist in Afghanistan today. Neither the Taliban-led "Islamic Emirate of Afghanistan" nor the "Islamic State of Afghanistan" headed by the ousted President Rabbani has the political legitimacy or administrative efficiency of a state. The militia formations they command are composed of odd assortments of armed groups with varying level of loyalties, political commitment, professional skills, and organizational integrity. Many of them feel free to switch sides, shift loyalties, and join or leave the group spontaneously. The country suffers from the absence of a top political layer capable of controlling individual and group violence. ... Although both sides identify their units with military formations of the old regime, there is hardly any organizational or professional continuity from the past. But these units really exist in name only ... [i]n fact only their military bases still exist, accommodating and supporting an assortment of militia groups.

Formations in existence by the end of 2002 included the 1st Army Corps (Nangarhar), 2nd Army Corps (Kandahar, dominated by Gul Agha Sherzai), 3rd Army Corps (Paktia, where the US allegedly attempted to impose Atiqullah Ludin as commander), 4th Army Corps (Herat, dominated by Ismail Khan), 6th Army Corps at Kunduz, 7th Army Corps (under Atta Muhammad Nur at Balkh), 8th Army Corps (at Jowzjan, dominated by Dostum's National Islamic Movement of Afghanistan) and the Central Army Corps around Kabul. In addition, there were divisions with strong links to the centre in Kabul. These included the 1st in Kabul, 27th in Qalat, 31st in Kabul, 34th in Bamiyan (4th Corps), 36th in Logar, 41st in Ghor, 42nd in Wardak, 71st in Farah, and 100th in Laghman.

The International Crisis Group wrote:

New divisions and even army corps were created to recognise factional realities or undermine the power base of individual commanders, often without regard to the troop levels normally associated with such units. For example, the ministry in July 2002 recognised a 25th Division in Khost province, formed by the Karzai-appointed governor, Hakim Taniwal, to unseat a local warlord, Padshah Khan Zadran, who was then occupying the governor's residence. At its inception, however, the division had only 700 men – the size of a battalion.

The 93rd Division of the AMF, which Malkasian's The American War in Afghanistan (2021) describes as "1,200 strong" was later reported in southern Helmand.

Even by December 2004 Human Rights Watch was still saying in an open letter to Karzai that: "Abdul Rabb al-Rasul Sayyaf, the head of the Ittihad-i Islami faction and the Daw'at-e Islami party [should be curbed]. Sayyaf has no government post but has used his power over the Supreme Court and other courts across the country to curtail the rights of journalists, civic society activists, and even political candidates. He also controls militias, including forces recognized as the 10th Division of the Afghan army, which intimidate and abuse Afghans even inside Kabul. We ask that you express public opposition to Sayyaf's activities, explicitly state your opposition to such misuse of unofficial authority, and move expeditiously to disarm and demobilize armed forces associated with Ittihad-i Islami and other unofficial forces."

Emblem of the Afghan National Army (2002–2021)

=== Afghan National Army (2002–2021) ===
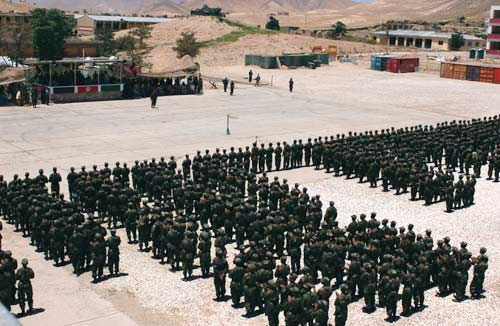
The first batch of graduates of the new Afghan National Army (ANA) in 2002

During the Bonn Conference on Afghanistan in early December 2001, President Hamid Karzai issued a decree reestablishing a unified army, the Afghan National Army. The decree set a size target of 70,000 (by 2009) and laid out the planned army structure. There had been significant disagreement over the size of the army that was needed. A Ministry of Defense-issued paper said that at least 200,000 active troops were needed. The Afghan Ministry of Defence loudly objected to the smaller, volunteer, nature of the new army, a change from the previous usage of conscripts. The US also blocked the new government from using the army to pressure Pakistan.

The first new Afghan kandak (battalion) was trained by British Army personnel of the International Security Assistance Force (ISAF), becoming 1st Battalion, Afghan National Guard. Yet while the British troops provided high quality training, they were few in number. After some consideration, it was decided that the United States might be able to provide the training. Thus follow-on kandaks were recruited and trained by 1st Battalion, 3rd Special Forces Group. 3rd SFG built the training facilities and ranges for early use, using a Soviet built facility on the eastern side of Kabul, near the then ISAF headquarters.

Recruiting and training began in May 2002, with a difficult but successful recruitment process of bringing hundreds of new recruits in from all parts of Afghanistan. Training was initially done in Pashto and Dari (Persian dialect) and some Arabic due to the very diverse ethnicities. The original US target in April 2002 was that of 12,000 men trained by April 2003, but it was quickly realised that this was too ambitious, and the requirement reduced to only 9,000, to be ready by November 2003. The first female Afghan parachutist Khatol Mohammadzai, trained during the 1980s, became the first female general in the Afghan National Army in August 2002. The National Military Academy of Afghanistan, a West Point analogue and part of the Marshal Fahim National Defense University based in Qargha Garrison, was also established to produce officers. The NMAA administered a four-year military and civil training programme with the aim of preparing the prospective officer for the long-term. The NMAA taught four major foreign languages, vital to developing the relationship between the ANA and foreign armies.

The U.S. Army's major objectives for the ANA in October 2002 were:

- Ensure activation of Central Corps headquarters and its three Brigades by 1 October 2003
- Develop and begin implementation of Afghan MoD/General Staff reform plan
- Establish ANA institutional support systems including officer and NCO schools, ANA training and doctrine directorate, and garrison support elements
- Design and build Office of Military Cooperation-Afghanistan (OMC-A) ..consisting of US/Coalition military, contractor, and Afghan civilian and military personnel capable of managing the ANA building program as it increases in scope and complexity
- Increase international and Afghan domestic support for and confidence in ANA through the maintenance of quality within the force and the conduct of effective information operations.

The first deployment outside Kabul was made by 3rd Kandak ANA to Paktika Province, including Orgun, in January 2003. By January 2003 just over 1,700 soldiers in five Kandaks (battalions) had completed the 10-week training course, and by mid-2003 a total of 4,000 troops had been trained. Approximately 1,000 ANA soldiers were deployed in the US-led Operation Warrior Sweep, marking the first major combat operation for Afghan troops. Initial recruiting problems lay in the lack of cooperation from regional warlords and inconsistent international support. The problem of desertion dogged the force from the outset: in the summer of 2003, the desertion rate was estimated to be 10% and in mid-March 2004, an estimate suggested that 3,000 soldiers had deserted. Some recruits were under 18 years of age and many could not read or write. Recruits who only spoke the Pashto language experienced difficulty because instruction was usually given through interpreters who spoke Dari.

The Afghan New Beginnings Programme (ANBP) was launched on 6 April 2003 and begin disarmament of former Army personnel in October 2003. In March 2004, fighting between two local militias took place in the western Afghan city of Herat. It was reported that Mirwais Sadiq (son of warlord Ismail Khan) was assassinated in unclear circumstances. Thereafter a bigger conflict began that resulted in the death of up to 100 people. The battle was between troops of Ismail Khan and Abdul Zahir Nayebzada, a senior local military commander blamed for the death of Sadiq. Nayebzada commanded the 17th Herat Division of the Afghan Militia Forces' 4th Corps. In response to the fighting, about 1,500 newly trained ANA soldiers were sent to Herat in order to bring the situation under control.

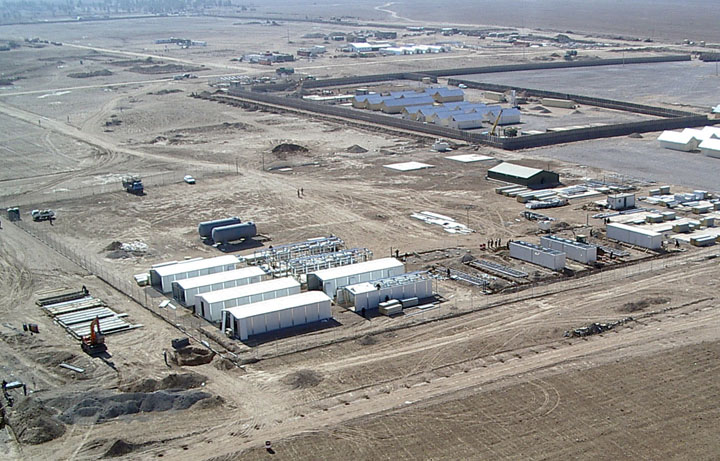
Construction of Camp Zafar for the ANA in Herat Province (2005)

In addition to the fighting units, establishment of regional structures began when four of the five planned corps commanders and some of their staff were appointed on 1 September 2004. The first regional command was established in Kandahar on 19 September; the second at Gardez on 22 September, with commands at Mazar-i-Sharif and Herat planned. The Gardez command, also referred to in the AFPS story as the 203 Corps, was to have an initial force of 200 soldiers. Kandahar's command was the first activated, followed by Gardez and Mazar-e-Sharif. The Herat command was seemingly activated on 28 September. The next year, the ANA's numbers grew to around 20,000 soldiers, most of which were trained by the United States Army. In the meantime, the United States Army Corps of Engineers started building new military camps for the fast-growing army.

In 2003, the United States issued guidelines to ensure the army's ethnic balance. By late 2012, the ANA was composed of 43% Pashtuns, 32% Tajiks, 12% Hazaras, 8% Uzbeks, and the rest were smaller ethnic groups of Afghanistan. However, the army did not track the actual ethnic composition of the officer corps. There were no quotas for the enlisted soldiers.

By March 2011, a National Military Command Center had been established in Kabul, which was being mentored by personnel from the Virginia Army National Guard.

==== Costs and salaries ====
Under the US–Afghanistan Strategic Partnership Agreement, the United States designated Afghanistan as a major non-NATO ally and agreed to fund the ANA until at least 2024. This included soldiers' salaries, providing training and weapons, and all other military costs.

Soldiers in the Army initially received $30 a month during training and $50 a month upon graduation, though the basic pay for trained soldiers later rose to $165. This starting salary increased to $230 a month in an area with moderate security issues and to $240 in those provinces where there was heavy fighting. About 95% of the men and women who served in the military were paid by electronic funds transfer. Special biometrics were used during the registration of each soldier.

==== Training and international partnerships ====
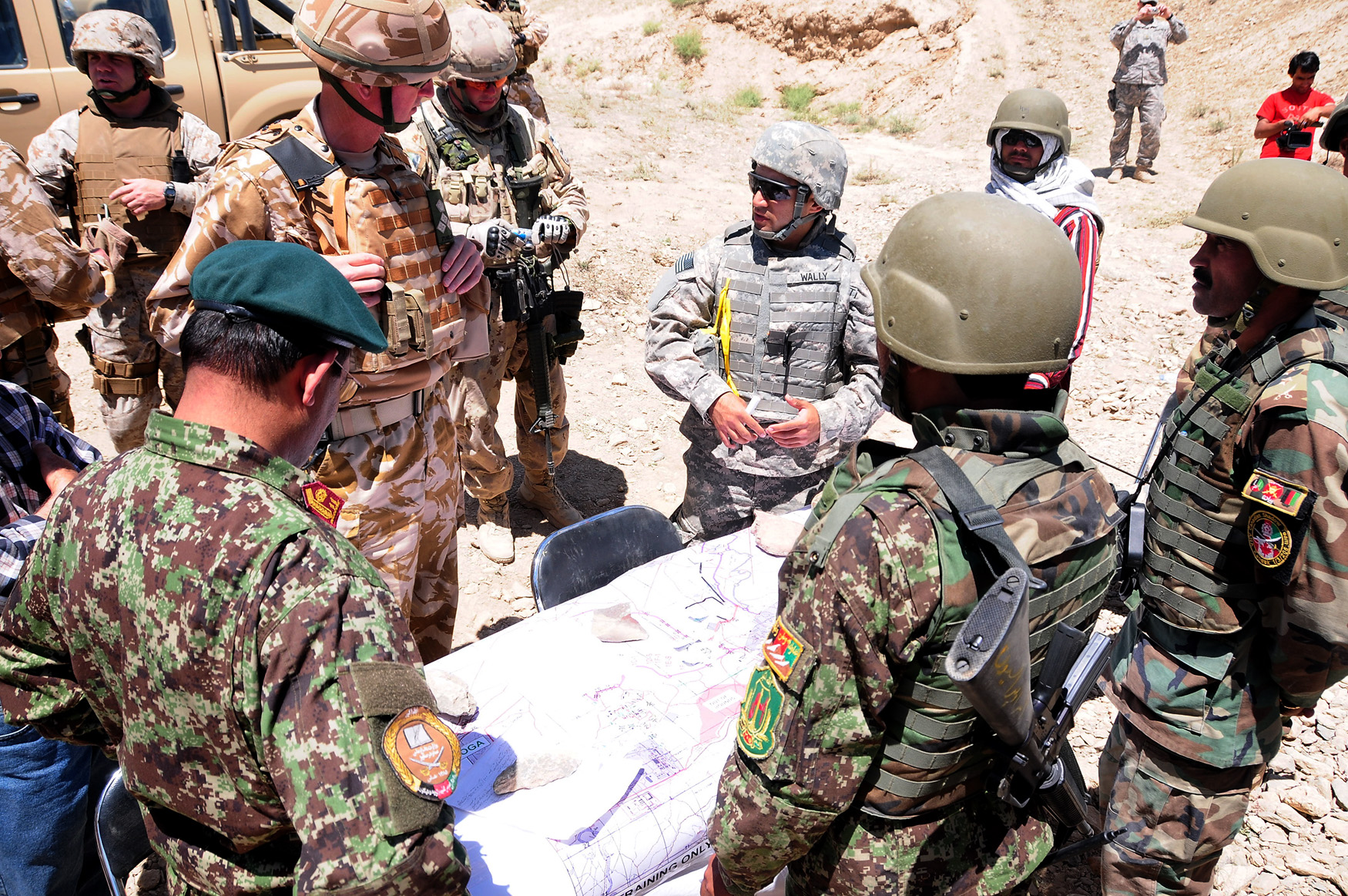
A British brigadier gets a brief ahead of a training exercise

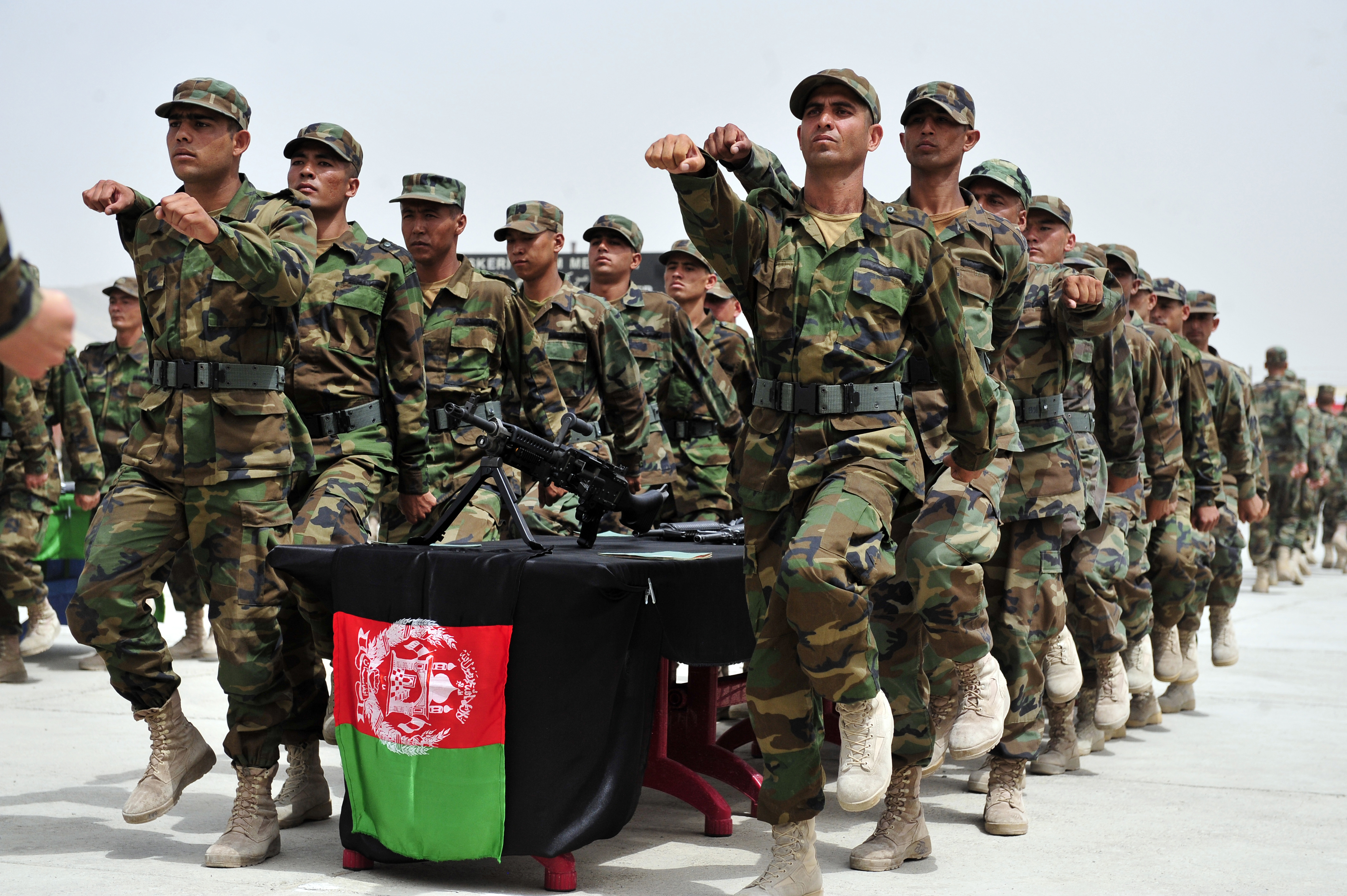
Newly trained ANA soldiers recite the oath ceremony of the first term bridmals (NCOs) at the Ghazi Military Training Center in Kabul province.

Task Force Phoenix was the initial U.S. and allied force training organisation in 2002. This program was formalized in April 2003, based near the Kabul Military Training Center. Coalition efforts were initially overseen by OMC-A, then Office of Security Cooperation-Afghanistan, then from 2006 to 2009, by the Combined Security Transition Command – Afghanistan (CSTC-A), a three-star level multi-national command headquartered in downtown Kabul. On the Afghan side, by 2011 all training and education in the Army was run by Afghan National Army Training Command, a two-star command which reported directly to the Chief of the General Staff. All training centers and military schools were under this command.

Individual basic training was conducted primarily by Afghan instructors and staff at the Kabul Military Training Center, situated on the eastern edge of Kabul. The United States Department of Defense assisted in basic and advanced training of enlisted recruits, and also ran the Drill Instructor School which ran basic training courses for training NCOs. Basic training had been expanded to include required literacy courses for illiterate recruits. A French Army advisory team oversaw the training of officers for staff and platoon or toli (company) command in a combined commissioning/infantry officer training unit called the Officer Training Brigade (OTB). OTB candidates in the platoon and company command courses were usually former militia and mujaheddin leaders with various levels of military experience. The United Kingdom also conducted initial infantry officer training and commissioning at the Officer Candidate School (OCS). OCS candidates were young men with little or no military experience. The British Army also conducted initial and advanced Non-Commissioned Officer training as well in a separate NCO Training Brigade.

The Canadian Forces supervised the Combined Training Exercise portion of initial military training, where trainee soldiers, NCOs, and officers were brought together in field training exercises at the platoon, toli (company) and kandak (battalion) levels to certify them ready for field operations. In the Regional Corps, Coalition Embedded Training Teams continued to mentor the kandak's leadership, and advised them in the areas of intelligence, communications, fire support, logistics and infantry tactics.

During the ISAF era, advisers in the US Embedded Training Teams and NATO Operational Mentor and Liaison Teams acted as liaisons between the Afghan Army and coalition forces. The teams coordinated planning and ensured that ANA units received U.S./Coalition support.

Formal education and professional development was conducted at two main ANATC schools, both in Kabul. The National Military Academy of Afghanistan, located near the Kabul International Airport, was a four-year military university which produced degree second lieutenants in a variety of military professions. NMAA's first cadet class entered its second academic year in spring 2006. A contingent of US and Turkish instructors jointly mentored the NMAA faculty and staff. The Command and General Staff College, located in southern Kabul, prepared mid-level ANA officers to serve on brigade and corps staffs. France established the CGSC in early 2004, and a cadre of French Army instructors continued to oversee operations at the school.

Sizable numbers of Afghan National Army Officers were sent to be trained in India either at the Indian Military Academy in Dehradun, the National Defence Academy near Pune or the Officers Training Academy in Chennai. The Indian Military Academy which had been in existence since 1932, provided a four-year degree to ANA army officers, while the National Defence Academy provided a 3-year degree after which officers underwent a one-year specialization in their respective service colleges. The Officers Training Academy provided a 49-week course to Graduate officer candidates. In 2014 the number of Afghan officers in training in India was nearly 1100. A total of 1200 Afghan officers were trained up to 2013.

In October 2007, ANA international partners said they had seen progress and were pleased with Afghan performance in recent exercises. Colonel Thomas McGrath estimated that the ANA would be capable of carrying out independent brigade-size operations by the spring of 2008. Despite high hopes, four years after McGrath's estimated date for independent brigade-sized operations, not a single one of the ANA's 180 kandaks could carry out independent operations, much less an entire brigade. On 30 July 2013, US Acting Assistant Secretary of Defense Peter Lavoy told reporters in Washington, D.C., according to Jane's Defence Weekly, that '... a residual [US] force would be needed to help the ANSF complete more mundane tasks such as logistics, ensuring soldiers get their paychecks, procuring food, awarding fuel contracts, and more.' Lavoy noted that the Afghans were still developing those skills and it would be "well beyond the 2014 date" before they were expected to be capable.

An increasing number of female soldiers joined. By early 2013, reports stated that there were 200,000 ANA troops. However, the Special Inspector General for Afghanistan Reconstruction said in January 2013 that "Determining ANSF strength is fraught with challenges. US and coalition forces rely on the Afghan forces to report their own personnel strength numbers. ..[T]he Combined Security Transition Command-Afghanistan.. noted that.. there is "no viable method of validating [the ANA's] personnel numbers." It was reported in 2016 that the Afghan National Army had close to 1,000 officers with the rank of general, more than the number of generals in the United States Army.

==== Ineffectiveness ====
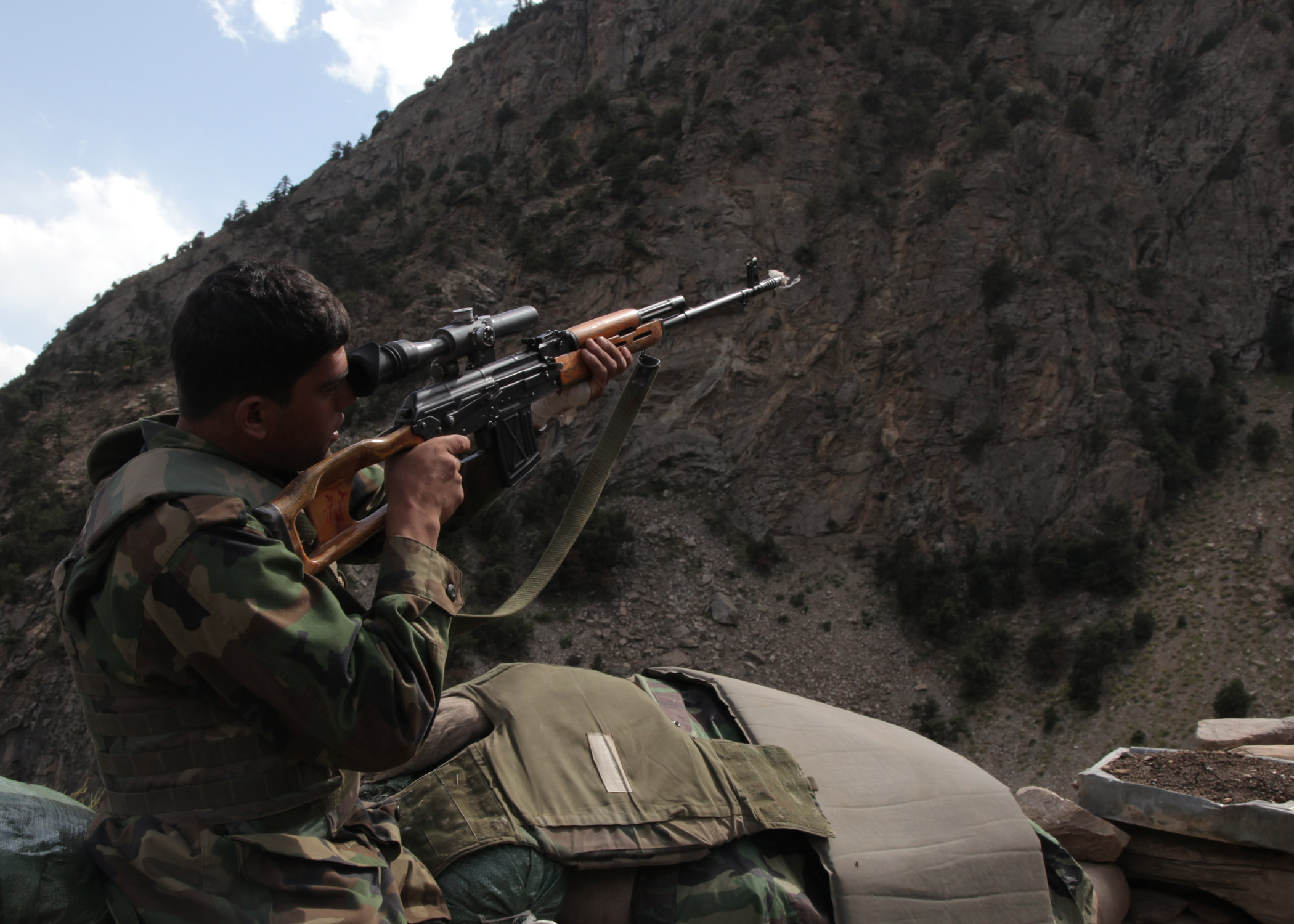
An ANA soldier of the 201st Corps using a PSL rifle

The ANA was plagued by poor cohesion, illiteracy, corruption and abuse. A quarter of ANA troops were reported to have deserted in 2009 with many troops hiding in the heat of battle rather than engaging the enemy. It was reported that approximately 90% of ANA troops were illiterate and there were widespread instances of corruption with the ANA manpower consisting a high percentage of ghost battalions. Another significant problem for the ANA was a high level of drug abuse amongst its soldiers. The Special Investigator General for Afghan Reconstruction reported the number of ANA soldiers using drugs was "at least 50 percent" and might have been as high as 75 percent, according to some reports.

Many officers held loyalties with particular political factions. The endemic corruption of those officers eroded the army's morale.

Theft and a lack of discipline plagued many elements of the ANA. US trainers reported missing vehicles, weapons and other military equipment, and outright theft of fuel provided by the US to the ANA. Death threats had been leveled against some US officers who tried to stop Afghan soldiers from stealing. Some Afghan soldiers often found improvised explosive devices and snipped the command wires instead of marking them and waiting for US forces to come to detonate them. The practice allowed insurgents to return and reconnect them. US trainers frequently had to remove the cell phones from Afghan soldiers hours before a mission for fear that the operation would be compromised by bragging, gossip and reciprocal warnings.

At times ANA troops attacked their own troops and foreign troops of ISAF. Fragging had worsened enough to the point where two decrees were issued by the Department of Defense in the summer of 2012 stating that all American personnel serving in Afghanistan were told to carry a magazine with their weapon at all times, and that when a group of American troops were present and on duty with ANA forces, one American serviceman had to stand apart on guard with a loaded weapon ready. In addition to fragging, a report by a US inspector general revealed 5,753 cases of "gross human rights abuses by Afghan forces", including "routine enslavement and rape of underage boys (Bacha bazi) by Afghan commanders". The ineffectiveness of the ANA became most apparent during the 2021 Taliban offensive; thousands of ANA troops surrendered to the Taliban en masse, with many cities falling to the Taliban unopposed.

President Ashraf Ghani was also accused of replacing officers with people who supported his ideas, leading to declining morale among Afghan soldiers and officers.

==== Structure 2002–2021 ====
A January 2011 NATO Training Mission-Afghanistan information paper described the ANA as being led by the Chief of General Staff, supervising the Vice Chief of the General Staff, the Vice Chief of the Armed Forces (an Air Force officer), the Director of the General Staff, himself supervising the General Staff itself, and seven major commands. The ANA Ground Force Command, under a lieutenant general, directed the regional ground forces corps and the 111th Capital Division. Amongst support facilities were two National Ammunition Depots, at Khairabad, and at Chimtallah National Ammunition Depot, both in the environs of the capital, plus four corps-level Ammunition Supply Points.

==== Corps and other major commands ====
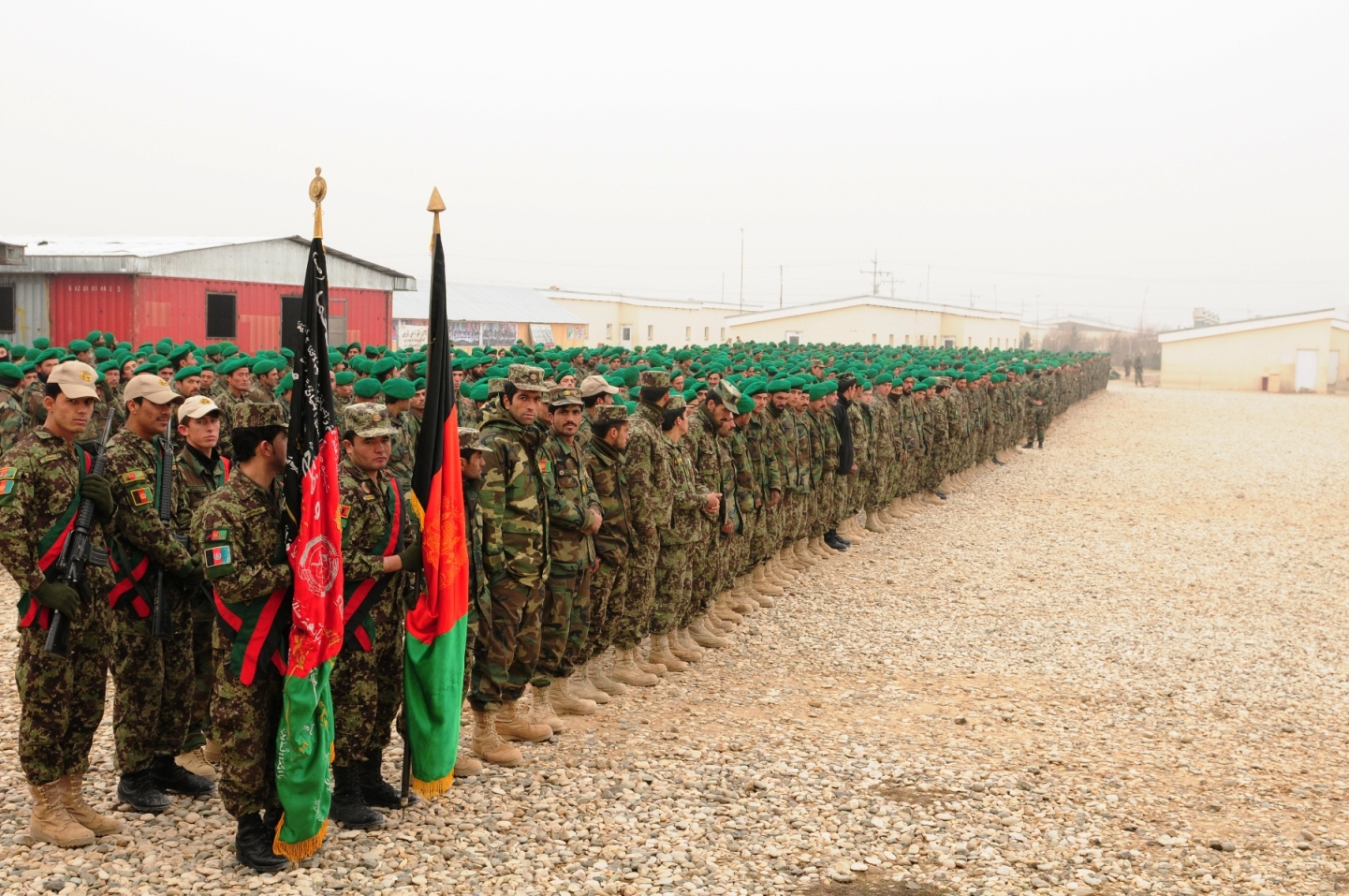
Soldiers of the 209th Corps in Balkh Province

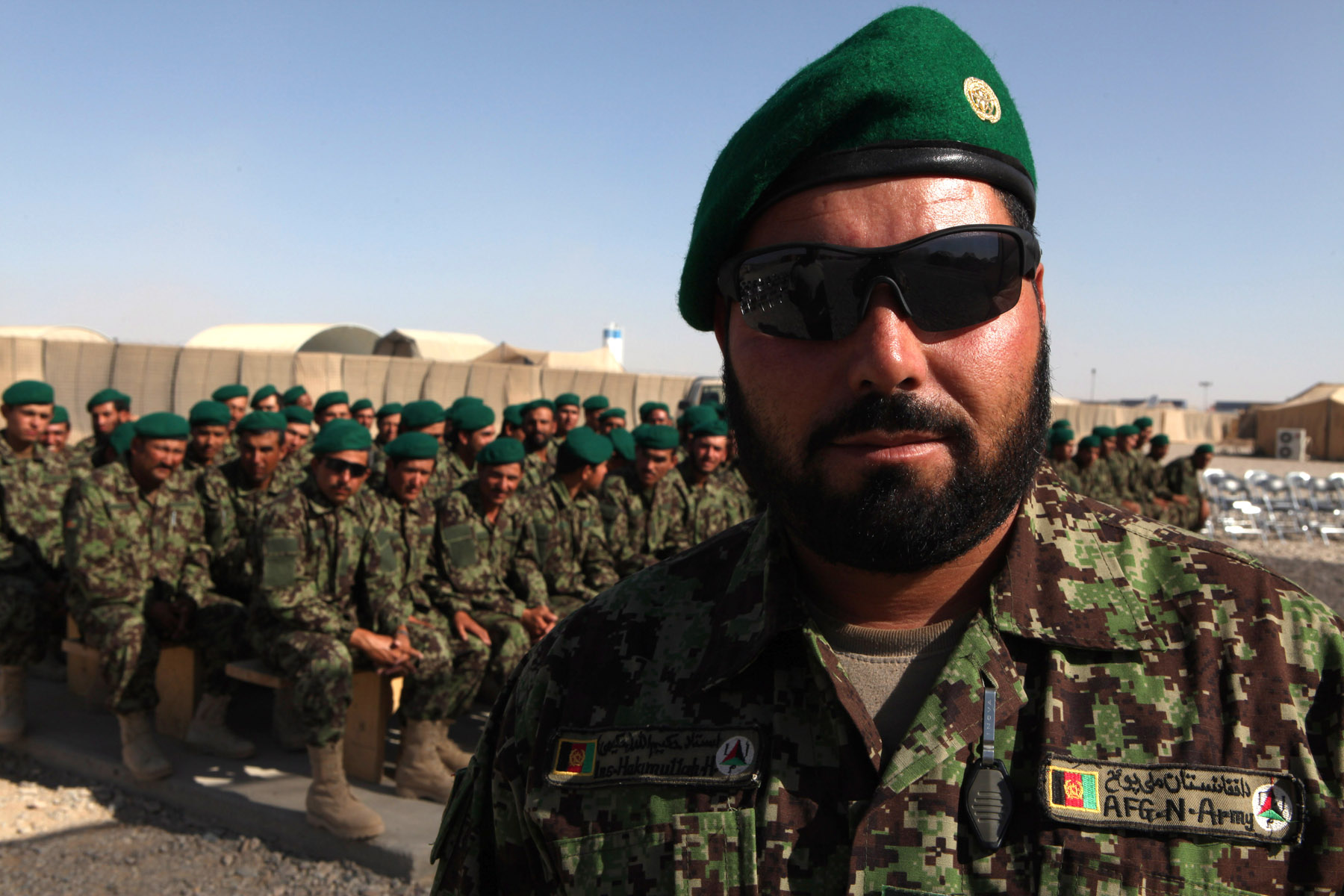
Soldiers of the 215th Corps in Helmand Province

At its largest the Afghan National Army had seven corps; each corps was responsible for an area of the country. Establishment of the corps started when four regional commands were established with some staff in September 2004. The Afghan National Army Air Corps later renamed the Afghan Air Force also formed part of the army. Each corps had three to four subordinate brigades, and each brigade had four infantry Kandaks (battalions) as basic fighting units. Each kandak was assigned a specific area for which it is responsible for; its mission was to secure its area from internal and external threats.

Originally, the four outlying corps were assigned one or two brigades, with the majority of the manpower of the Army based in Kabul's 201st Corps. This was superseded by a buildup in which each corps added extra brigades. Originally, the 2008 Combined Security Transition Command – Afghanistan size target was for a total of 14 brigades: 13 infantry, one mechanized, and one commando.

In 2019–2021, the regionally focused corps were as follows:

- 201st Corps (Kabul) – 1st Brigade was based at the Presidential Palace. 3rd Brigade, at Pol-e-Chakri, was to be a mechanised formation including M-113s and Soviet-built main battle tanks (T-62s). In early 2008 LongWarJournal.org placed most of the 3rd Brigade at Jalalabad, 2nd Brigade at Pol-e-Charkhi, and only a single kandak of 1st Brigade at the Presidential Palace. The corps area of responsibility included Eastern Afghanistan, including Kabul, Logar, Kapisa, Konar, and Laghman provinces. This included Kabul as well as vital routes running north and south, and valleys leading from the Pakistani border into Afghanistan.
- 203rd Corps (Gardez) The original Gardez Regional Command was established on 23 September 2004. As of 2009, First Brigade, Khost, Second Brigade, Forward Operating Base Rushmore, Sharana, Paktika Province, Third Brigade, Ghazni. On 19 Oct 2006, as part of Operation Mountain Fury, two ETTs (Embedded Training Teams) mentored and advised a D30 artillery section from Fourth Kandak, Second Brigade, 203rd Corps, to conduct the first artillery missions during combat operations with harassment and indirect fires. Three days later, they successfully conducted counterfire (with assistance from a US Q-36 radar) that resulted in a reported ten enemy casualties. The corps is supported by the Gardez Regional Support Squadron of the AAF, equipped with 8 helicopters: 4 transport to support the corps' commando kandak, two attack, and two medical transport.
- 205th Corps (Kandahar) – oversaw the provinces of Kandahar, Zabul, and 4th Brigade Urozgan under Brigadier General Zafar Khan's control. It consisted of four brigades, a commando kandak and three garrisons. The corps had integrated artillery and airlift capacity, supplied by a growing Kandahar Wing of the Afghan Air Force.
- 207th Corps (Herat) – 1st Brigade at Herat, 2nd Brigade at Farah, and elements at Shindand (including commandos). The corps was supported by the Herat Regional Support Squadron of the AAF, equipped with eight helicopters: four transport to support the corps' commando kandak, two attack, and two medical transport aircraft.
- 209th Corps (Mazar-i-Sharif) – Worked closely with the German-led Regional Command North, and had 1st Brigade at Mazar-i-Sharif and, it appears, a Second Brigade forming at Kunduz. An Army Corps of Engineers solicitation for Kunduz headquarters facilities for the Second Brigade was issued in March 2008. The corps was supported by the Mazar-i-Sharif Regional Support Squadron of the AAF, equipped with eight helicopters: four transport to support the Corps' commando kandak, two attack, and two medical transport helicopters. In October 2015, as a response to the fall of Kunduz, reports came that a new division would be formed in the area.
- 215th Corps (Lashkar Gah) – In 2010, the Afghan government approved a sixth corps of the Afghan National Army – Corps 215 Maiwand – to be based in the Helmand capital of Lashkar Gah. The 215th was developed specifically to partner with the Marine Expeditionary Brigade in Helmand. On 28 January 2010, Xinhua reported that General Sayed Mallok would command the new corps. The corps will cover all parts of Helmand, half of Farah and most parts of southwestern Nimroz province. The corps was formally established on 1 April 2010. 1st Bde, 215th Corps, is at Garmsir, partnered with a USMC Regimental Combat Team. Elements of 2nd Brigade, 215th Corps, had been reported at Forward Operating Base Delaram, Farah Province. 3rd Bde, 215th Corps, partnered with the UK Task Force Helmand is at Camp Shorabak.
- 217th Corps (Headquarters Kunduz) In 2019, the 20th Division, which was formerly part of the 209th Corps, became the 217th Corps. The corps was given responsibility for Kunduz Province, Takhar, Baghlan, and Badakhshan provinces. In August 2021, the Taliban seized control of the corps headquarters and Kunduz as part of the 2021 Taliban offensive.
- 111th Capital Division – in late 2008 it was announced that the 201st Corps' former area of responsibility would be divided, with a Capital Division being formed in Kabul and the corps concentrating its effort further forward along the border. The new division, designated the 111th Capital Division, became operational in April 2009. It had a First Brigade and Second Brigade (both forming) as well as a Headquarters Special Security Brigade.

Most of the corps were retained, with their existing numerical designations, but renamed, in November 2021, after the Taliban seized power.

Other commands included:

- ANA Special Operations Command – from mid-2011, the ANA began establishing a Special Operations Command to control the Commando Brigade and the ANA Special Forces. Its headquarters was established at Camp Moorehead in Wardak Province, ten kilometres (six miles) south of Kabul. In July 2007 the ANA graduated its first commandos. The commandos underwent a grueling three-month course being trained by American special forces. They were fully equipped with US equipment and had received specialized light infantry training with the capability to conduct raids, direct action, and reconnaissance in support of counterinsurgency operations; they also provided a strategic response capability for the Afghan government.
- Army Support Command, the ANA Recruiting Command, the Headquarters Security and Support Brigade (HSSB), and the Detainee Guard Force (as of 2011).
- The ANA Ground Force Command was active c. 2009 to 2015. Under a lieutenant general it directed the regional ground forces corps and the 111th Capital Division. The Inspector General of the Department of Defense expressed concerns with the ANA Ground Force Command in these terms in March 2013, as the U.S. and allies: "began developing the Ground Forces Command in April 2009 and it is scheduled to achieve full operational capability for command and control of ANA forces by October 2012. However, it may take longer for the Ministry of Defense, General Staff, and some Corps Commanders to embrace this new organization. Several ANSF stakeholders expressed their belief that GFC was an unnecessary, intermediate layer of bureaucracy. A number of Afghan security officials conveyed doubts about the long-term existence of the GFC HQ after 2014." .."General Staff reluctance to identify and divest authorities and responsibilities to the GFC inhibited the timely development of the Ground Forces Command. Afghan and Coalition officers also reported widespread, lukewarm support among senior level Ministry of Defense and General Staff officers for the establishment of the GFC. Operationally, some Afghan Corps commanders and staff members considered the GFC unnecessary and a redundant headquarters." The command was eventually disbanded in 2015; it was seen "by many as a redundant and unnecessary bureaucratic layer" between the General Staff and the regional corps.

===== Kandaks (battalions) =====
The basic Afghan National Army unit was the kandak (battalion), consisting of 600 troops. Kandaks were made up of four companies (toli). Although the vast majority of kandaks were infantry, at least one mechanized and one tank kandak had been formed. Every ANA Corps was assigned commando kandaks.

Seven Quick Reaction Forces (QRF) kandaks were created in 2012–13, one kandak for each of the ANA's corps and divisions. They were created by converting existing infantry kandaks into QRF kandaks at the NMAA Armour Branch School. The QRF kandaks were trained and fielded in 2012 and 2013. The QRF kandaks were the first major ANA users of armoured vehicles.

As the ANA grew, the focus changed to further developing the force so that it could become self-sustaining. Development of Combat Support Kandaks [Battalions] (CSK) was vital to any self-sustainability. Their role includes motor fleet maintenance, specialized communications, scouting, engineering, and long range artillery units. While most ANA brigades had a Combat Support Kandak, they were underdeveloped and did not fit the requirements of a growing army. Eventually one fully developed Combat Support Kandak was planned to be assigned to each of the 24 army combat brigades. Each Combat Support Kandak was planned to include an Intelligence toli (company) called a Cashf Tolai. Each company was responsible for collecting information about the surrounding area and Taliban activities. The members of the unit interacted closely with the local residents in an effort to deny the enemy control over the surrounding area.

Combat service support was not an initial U.S. development priority, as U.S. arrangements could be drawn upon. But in order for the ANA to be self-sufficient, a Corps Logistics Kandak was to be formed which was to be responsible for providing equipment to the 90 infantry kandaks. The CLK was responsible for the maintenance of the new heavier equipment including APCs. In the 215th Corps area, the US Marine Combat Logistics Battalion 1 announced in January 2010 that the training of the ANA 5th Kandak, 1st Brigade, 215th ANA Corps Logistics Kandak has gone very well and that the unit was capable of undertaking the majority of day-to-day activities on their own. The ANA never achieved self-sufficiency and after losing logistical and air support from the U.S., the ANA fell apart during the 2021 Taliban offensive, making a series of negotiated surrenders.

=== Other forces ===
The Afghan Border Force (ABF) was responsible for the security of Afghanistan's border area with neighboring countries extending up to 50 kilometres (30 mi) into the interior. In December 2017, most of the Afghan Border Police (ABP) personnel of the Afghan National Police were transferred to the Afghan National Army to form the ABF.| The Afghan National Police retained 4,000 ABP personnel for customs operations at border crossings and international airports. The ABF consisted of seven brigades.

The Afghan National Civil Order Force (ANCOF) was responsible for civil order and counterinsurgency. In March 2018, most of the Afghan National Civil Order Police (ANCOP) personnel of the Afghan National Police were transferred to the Afghan National Army to form the ANCOF with their role remaining the same. The remaining 2,550 ANCOP personnel in the Afghan National Police formed the Public Security Police (PSP). The ANCOF consisted of eight brigades. In June 2020, the ANCOF brigades began to be disbanded with personnel to be integrated into the Afghan National Army.

=== Collapse to Taliban in 2021 and reorganization ===
United States and other remaining NATO troops withdrew from Afghanistan in the summer of 2021. Couple with a rapid offensive conducted by the Taliban, the Afghan National Army then largely disintegrated, with large numbers of ANA soldiers abandoning their posts or surrendering en masse to the Taliban. This allowed the Taliban to capture large quantities of US-provided military equipment, vehicles and aircraft.

Prevalent corruption and low morale among Afghan troops were attributed as reasons to the collapse.

In August 2021, after the Taliban captured the Afghan capital Kabul and other major cities, US President Joe Biden stated that the "Afghan military collapsed, sometimes without trying to fight," and that "we [the United States of America] gave them every tool they could need." In an Al Jazeera editorial Abdul Basit wrote that the forces "preferred to save their lives by surrendering to the Taliban under its amnesty offers". NATO Secretary-General Jens Stoltenberg stated that Afghan government forces "fought bravely," but "ultimately, the Afghan political leadership failed to stand up to the Taliban and to achieve the peaceful solution that Afghans desperately wanted." International Security Assistance Force trainers additionally called the Afghan military "incompetent and unmotivated."

Soon, all the regional forces of the ANA had dissolved, with the exception of the 201st Corps and the 111th Capital Division, both of which were headquartered in Kabul, which had been surrounded by the Taliban. On 15 August 2021, the Taliban entered the outskirts of Kabul from multiple directions, beginning the fall of Kabul. On the same day, President Ashraf Ghani fled the country to Dubai. It was reported that ANA soldiers were fleeing to neighbouring countries in droves, some on foot and others onboard Afghan Air Force aircraft. At 8:55 pm local time, Taliban forces seized the Arg and raised their flag, soon afterwards declaring the restoration of the Islamic Emirate of Afghanistan.

Following the fall of Kabul, the remaining forces of the ANA either deserted their posts or surrendered to the Taliban. Some remnants of the ANA regrouped in the Panjshir Valley, where they joined the anti-Taliban National Resistance Front of Afghanistan. Around 500–600 remaining Afghan troops, made up mostly of Afghan Commandos, were reported to have refused to surrender to the Taliban in Kabul, and instead joined up with US forces in at Kabul International Airport, helping them secure the outer perimeter of the airport during the evacuation in August 2021. According to Pentagon spokesman John Kirby, the US would evacuate these remaining Afghan troops to safety if they wished to leave Afghanistan when the evacuation operation ended.

Since the Taliban took control, there has been more than 200 former Afghan security forces who either disappeared, or were extrajudicially executed. These figures only cover four provinces, meaning the real number of former Afghan security forces disappearing or being executed may be much higher. Taliban soldiers have hunted down former Afghan security forces in the aftermath of the withdrawal.

As of October 2021 the Islamic Emirate Army is subdivided into eight corps, mostly superseding the previous corps of the Afghan National Army. They are listed below. In November 2021 Mullah Yaqoob, Acting Minister of Defense, announced the new names of the corps.

Army Corps
| Corps | Headquarters | Superseded Corps | Commander(s) | Ref(s) |
|---|---|---|---|---|
| 313 Central Corps | Kabul | | Maulvi Naqibullah "Sahib" (Chief of Staff); Maulvi Nasrullah "Mati" (Commander); Maulvi Nusrat (Deputy Commander) | |
| 201 Khalid Ibn Walid Corps | Laghman | 201st Corps | Abdul Rahman Mansoori (Chief of Staff); Abu Dujana (Commander); Ibrahim (Deputy Commander) | |
| 203 Mansoori Corps | Gardez | 203rd Corps | Ahmadullah Mubarak (Chief of Staff); Mohammad Ayub (Commander); Rohul Amin (Deputy Commander) | |
| 205 Al-Badr Corps | Kandahar | 205th Corps | Hizbullah Afghan (Chief of Staff); Mehrullah Hamad (Commander); Wali Jan Hamza (Deputy Commander) | |
| 207 Al-Farooq Corps | Herat | 207th Corps | Abdul Rahman Haqqani (Chief of Staff); Mohammad Zarif Muzaffar (Commander); Abdul Shakur Baryalai (Deputy Commander) | |
| 209 Al-Fatah Corps | Mazar-i-Sharif | 209th Corps | Abdul Razzaq Faizullah (Chief of Staff); Attaullah Omari (Commander); Maulvi Amanuddin (Deputy Commander) | |
| 215 Azam Corps | Helmand | 215th Corps | Maulvi Abdul Aziz "Ansari" (Chief of Staff); Sharafuddin Taqi (Commander); Mohibullah Nusrat (Deputy Commander) | |
| 217 Omari Corps | Kunduz | 217th Corps | Mohammad Shafiq (Chief of Staff); Rahmatullah Mohammad (Commander); Mohammad Ismail Turkman (Deputy Commander) | |

== Army size ==
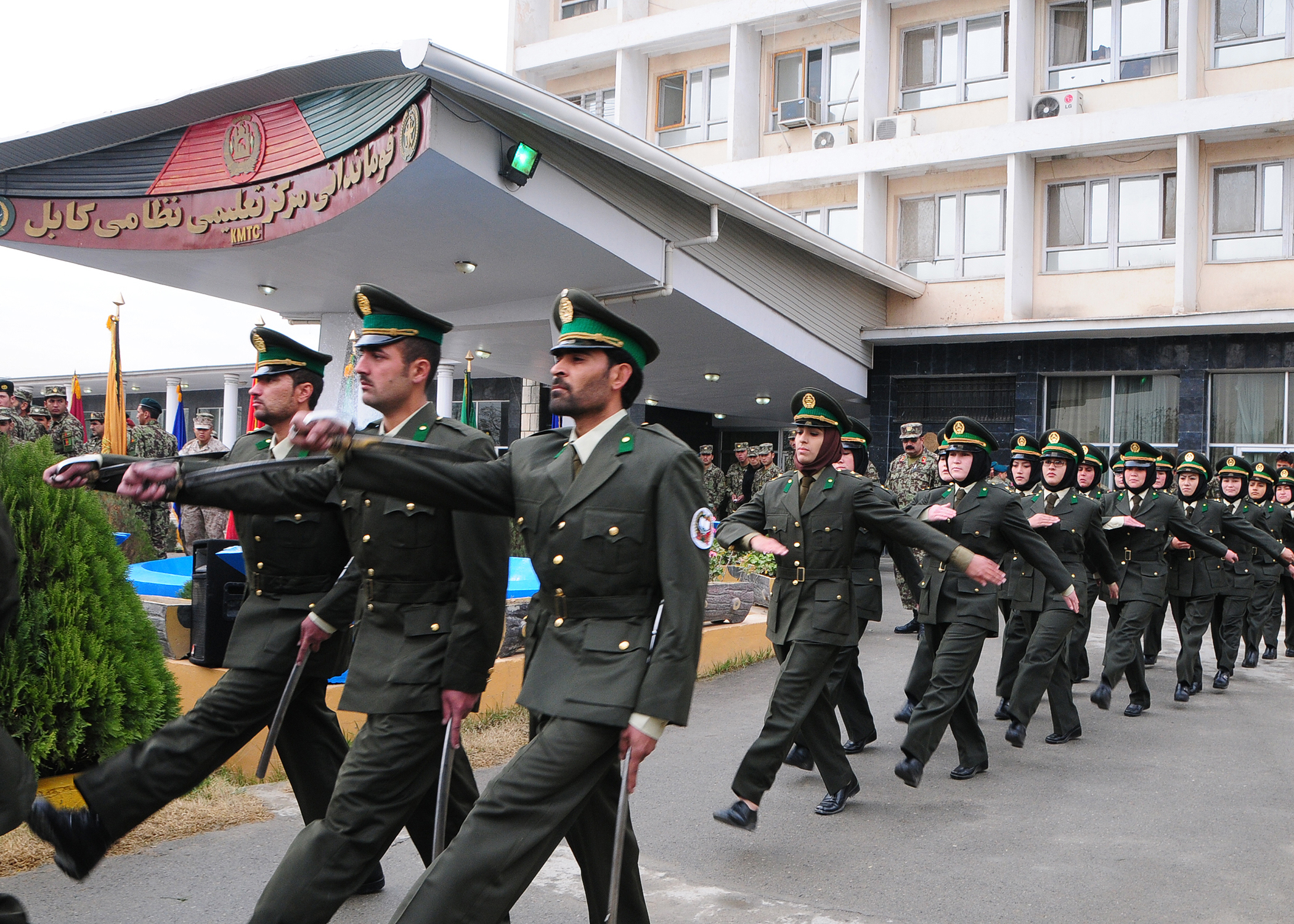
Fourteen female ANA soldiers marching into their graduation ceremony at the Kabul Military Training Center

A table of the size of the Afghan army over time is listed below.

| Head of state | Year | Total | Trained/regular |
|---|---|---|---|
| Ahmad Shah Durrani | 1747–1772 | 100,000 | |
| Timur Shah Durrani | 1789 | 150,000 | |
| Dost Mohammad Khan | 1857 | 25,000 | 7,400 |
| Sher Ali Khan | | 54,900 | |
| Abdur Rahman Khan | | 88,400 | 88,400 |
| Habibullah Khan | | 20,000 | 4,000 |
| Amanullah Khan | | 10,000 | 10,000 |
| Habibullāh Kalakāni | | 20,000 | 4,000 |
| Mohammed Nadir Shah | | 72,000 | 70,000 |
| Mohammad Hashim Khan | | 82–92,000 | 80–90,000 |
| Mohammed Zahir Shah | | 82,000 | 80,000 |
| Mohammad Najibullah | 1988 | 160,000 | 101,500 |
| Burhanuddin Rabbani | 1995 | 70,000 | |
| First Taliban period | | 100,000 | |
| Hamid Karzai | 2003 | 49,000 | 4,000 |

== Ranks ==
Following the return of the Taliban into power, the Islamic Emirate Armed Forces continue to use the rank insignia of the Afghan National Army, although updated insignias have been photographed.

Commissioned officer ranks

The rank insignia of commissioned officers.

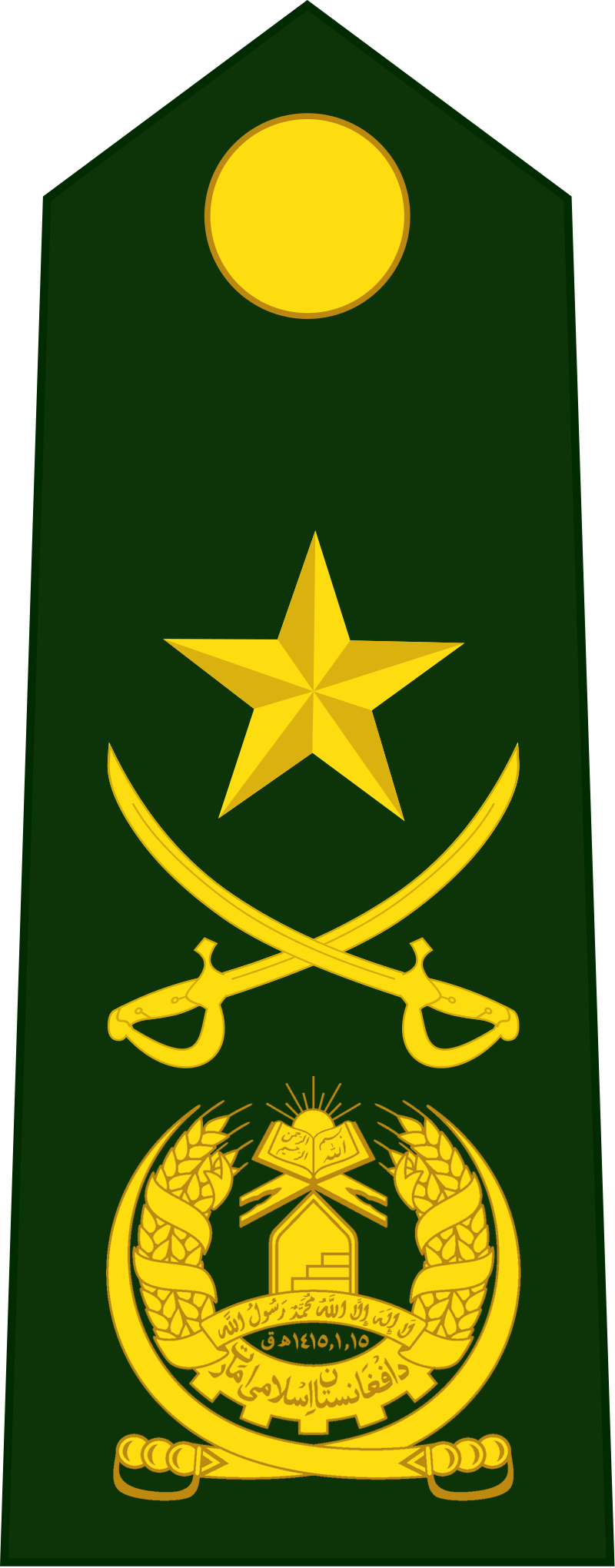
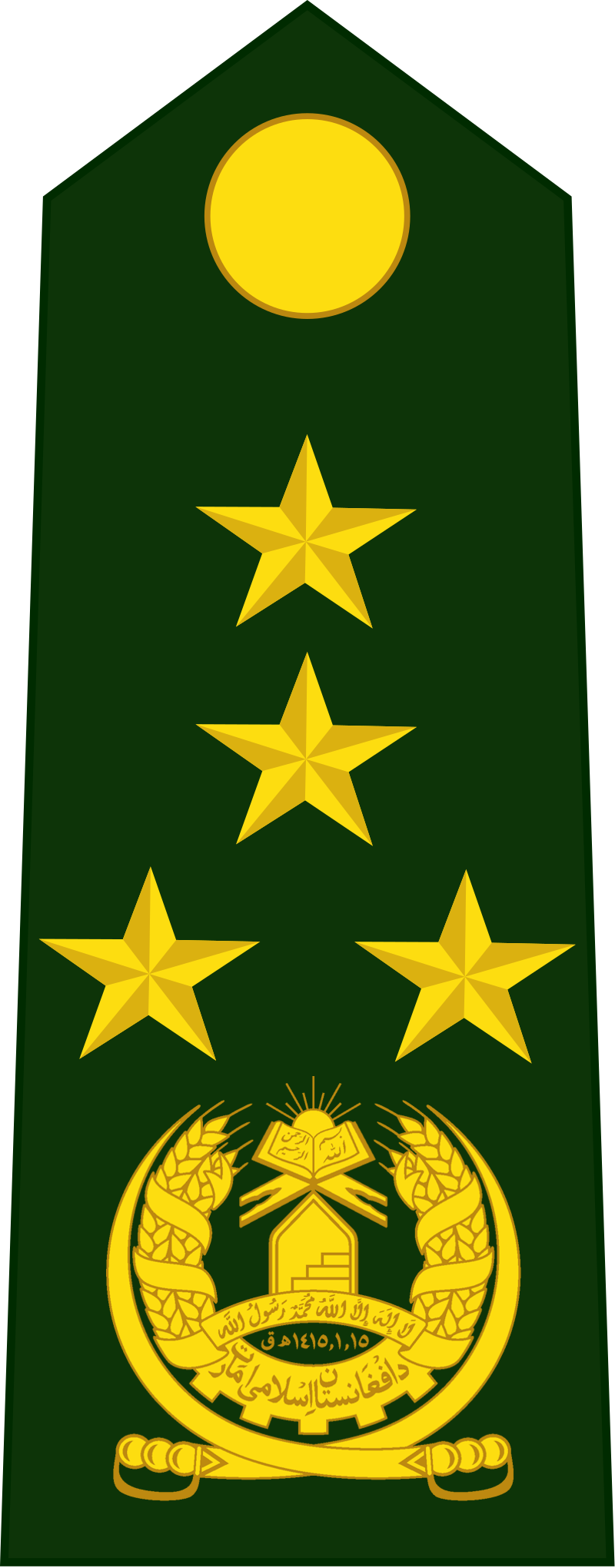
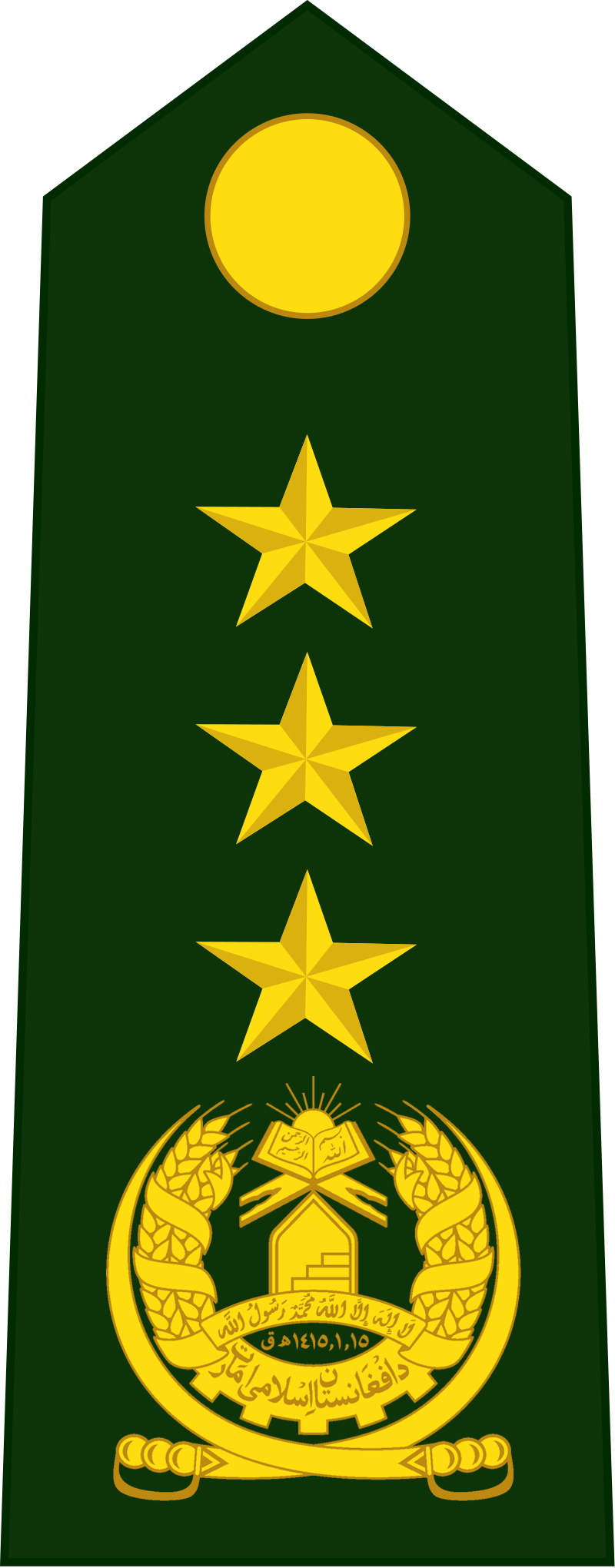
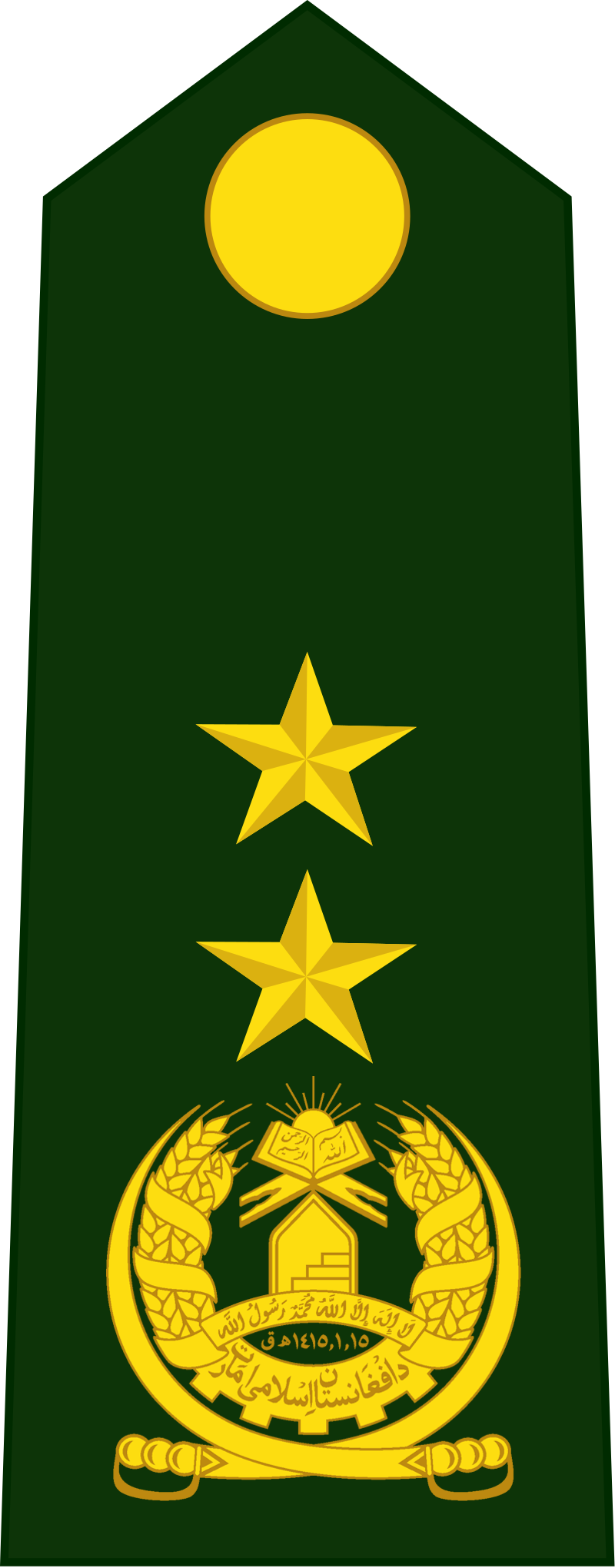
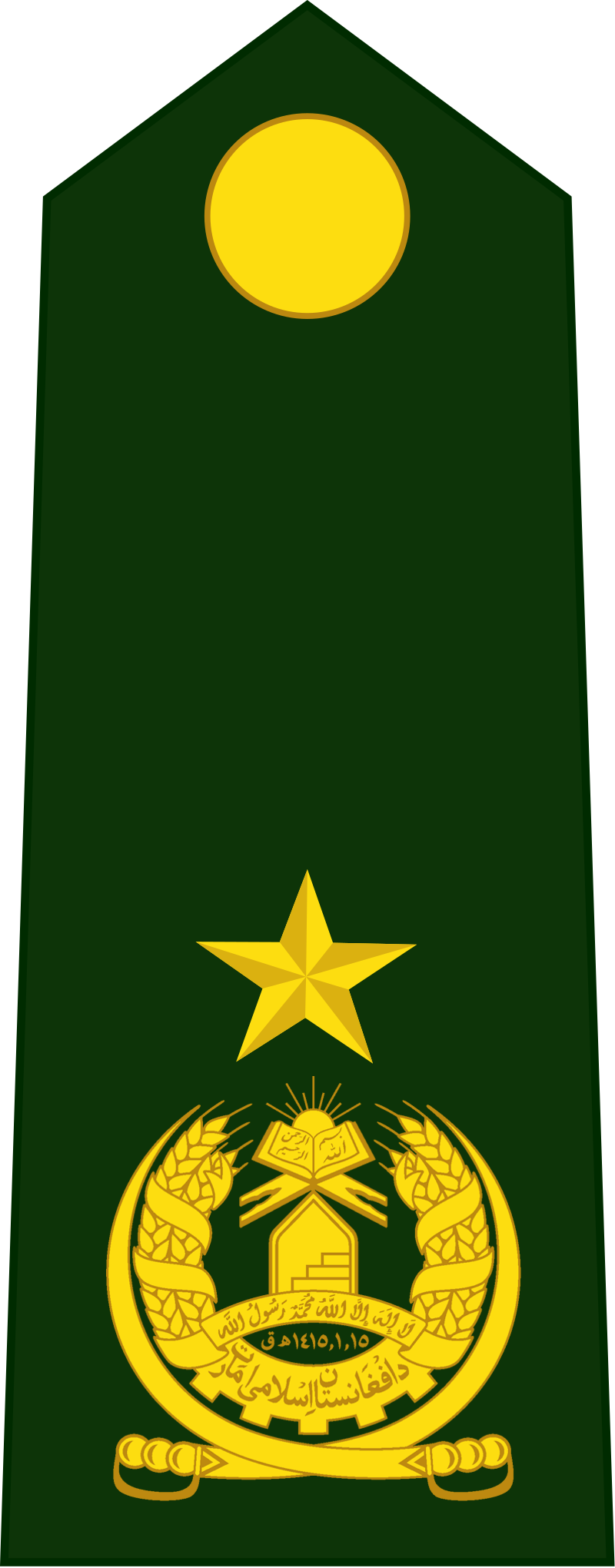
| Rank group | General / flag officers | | | | | Senior officers | | | Junior officers |
|---|---|---|---|---|---|---|---|---|---|---|---|---|---|
| Islamic National Army |
| Islamic National Army | مارشال; Marshal; Marshal | ستر جنرال; Setar jenral General | ډگرجنرال; Dagar jenral Lieutenant General | تورن جنرال; Turan jenral Major General | برید جنرال; Brid jenral Brigadier General | ډگروال; Dagarwal; Colonel | ډگرمن; Dagarman; Lieutenant Colonel | جگرن; Jagran; Major | جگتورن; Jag turan Captain | تورن; Turan; Junior Captain | لمړی بريدمن; Lomri baridman First Lieutenant | دوهم بریدمن; Dvahomi baridman Second Lieutenant | دریم بریدمن; Dreyom baridman Third Lieutenant |
| Rank group | General / flag officers | | | | | Senior officers | | | Junior officers |

Other ranks

The rank insignia of non-commissioned officers and enlisted personnel.

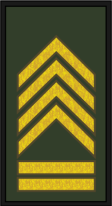
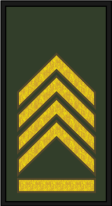
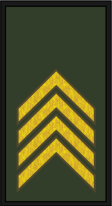
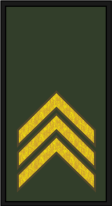
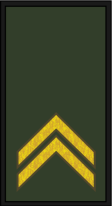
| Rank group | Senior NCOs | | | Junior NCOs | Enlisted |
|---|---|---|---|---|---|---|
| Islamic National Army | | | | | | No insignia |
| Islamic National Army | سرپرگمشر قدمدار; Serebergemser qadamdar Sergeant First Class | معاون سرپرگمشر قدمدار; Maawan serebergemser qadamdar Staff Sergeant | سرپرگمشر; Serebergemser; Sergeant | معاون سرپرگمشر; Maawan sarpargamshar Corporal | پرگمشر; Pregmesher; Private First Class | جندي; Jondi; Private |
| Rank group | Senior NCOs | | | Junior NCOs | Enlisted |

== Equipment ==
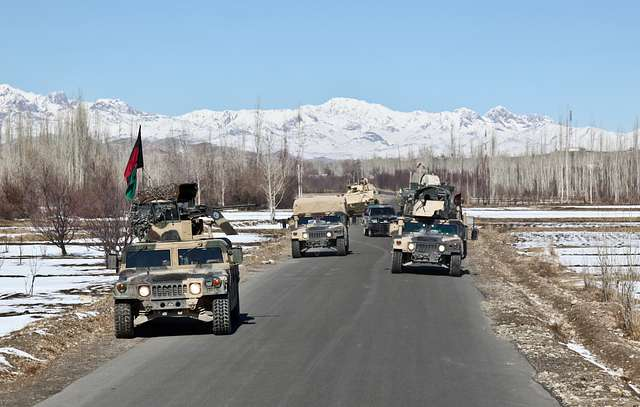
Humvees of the ANA

The Afghan Army was equipped with the Soviet AK-47 as its main service rifle from the 1970s, with the 444th Commando Battalion being the only unit with access to the rifle in 1968. As a major non-NATO ally of the United States, Afghanistan continued to receive billions of dollars in military assistance and the American M16 rifle joined the AK-47 as the service rifle. In addition, various U.S. rifles, bulletproof vests, night vision goggles, trucks and Mine Resistant Ambush-Protected vehicles entered service. The ANA previously had a contract with International Trucks that would provide a fleet of 2,781 trucks which could be used for transporting personnel, water, petroleum and as a recovery vehicle.

Besides NATO, Afghanistan had increasingly turned to its regional allies, India and Russia for military aid and supplies. Both countries supported the Northern Alliance, with funding, training, supplies and medical treatment of wounded fighters, against the Taliban for years prior to the US-led intervention in 2001.

After the removal of the Taliban government in late 2001, India invested several billion dollars in infrastructure development projects in Afghanistan, besides the training of Afghan officers in India. But India was unwilling to provide military aid unless under an UN-authorised peacekeeping mission. In 2014, India signed an agreement with Russia and Afghanistan where it would pay Russia for all the heavy equipment requested by Afghanistan instead of directly supplying them. The deal also includes the refurbishment of heavy weapons left behind since the Soviet war. Following the end of the 2021 Taliban offensive, all of the Afghan National Army's arsenal, including all of its U.S. military hardware, ended up in the hands of the Taliban.

== Bibliography ==
- Amtstutz, J. Bruce (1986). Afghanistan: The First Five Years of Soviet Occupation (PDF). Washington, DC.: National Defense University. Archived (PDF) from the original on 8 February 2015.
- Azimi, Nabi (2019). The Army and Politics: Afghanistan: 1963–1993. AuthorHouse (English edition). ISBN 978-1-7283-8701-7. Self published English version of originally "Persian" work; see translator's note.
- Bhatia, Michael; Sedra, Mark (2008). Afghanistan, Arms and Conflict: Armed groups, disarmament, and security in a postwar society. Abingdon: Routledge. ISBN 978-0-415-47734-5.
- Davis, Anthony (1994). "The Battlegrounds of Northern Afghanistan". Jane's Intelligence Review (July 1994). (pages 323 onwards)
- Davis, Anthony (1993). "The Afghan Army". Jane's Intelligence Review (March 1993).
- United States. Department of Defense (December 2020). Enhancing Security and Stability In Afghanistan (PDF). 7-653B15D.
- United States. Department of Defense (June 2018). Enhancing Security and Stability In Afghanistan (PDF). D-F54BED1.
- Antonio Giustozzi (2016). The Army of Afghanistan: A Political History of a Fragile Institution. London: C. Hurst & Co. ISBN 978-1-84904-481-3. 288 pp.; £35.00. Due to its 'simplicity, which matched low technology and basic organization found among the human resources available' the Taliban's army from 1996 to 2001 was perhaps the most successful national army for Afghanistan (p. 121).
- Giustozzi, Antonio (March 2007). "Auxiliary Force or National Army: Afghanistan 'ANA' and the COIN Effort 2002–2006". Small Wars and Insurgencies. 18 (1). doi:10.1080/09592310601173220. S2CID 143669542.
- Giustozzi, Antonio (Spring 2004). "The Demodernisation of an Army: Northern Afghanistan, 1992–2001". Small Wars & Insurgencies. 15 (1): 1–18. doi:10.1080/09592310410001676970. S2CID 143469209.
- Giustozzi, Antonio (2000). War, Politics, and Society in Afghanistan. Hurst. ISBN 978-1-85065-396-7.
- Grau, Lester W.; Jalali, Ahmad (2001). "The Campaign for the Caves:The battles for Zhawar in the Soviet-Afghan war". Journal of Slavic Military Studies. 14 (3): 69–92. doi:10.1080/13518040108430488. S2CID 144936749.
- Lalzoy, Najibullah (8 November 2021). "Taliban retitles all military corps in Afghanistan". The Khaama Press News Agency.
- Lead Inspector General (20 August 2019). "Operation Freedom's Sentinel: Lead Inspector General Report to the United States Congress, April 1, 2019 – June 30, 2019" (PDF). Department of Defense Office of the Inspector General.
- Isby, David (1986). Russia's War in Afghanistan. Osprey Publishing. ISBN 978-0-85045-691-2.
- Jacobsen, Annie (2019). Surprise, Kill, Vanish: The Secret History of CIA Paramilitary Armies, Operators, and Assassins. New York: Little, Brown and Company.
- Jalali, Ali A. (2002). "Rebuilding Afghanistan's National Army". Parameters. 32 (3). U.S. Army.
- Jalali, Ali A. (2001). "Afghanistan: The Anatomy of an Ongoing Conflict". Parameters (Spring 2001). U.S. Army: 85–98. Archived from the original on 10 December 2016.
- Janes (26 April 2001). "SS-1 'Scud' (R-11/8K11, R-11FM (SS-N-1B) and R-17/8K14)". Jane's Information Group. Archived from the original on 15 December 2007.
- Kelly, Terrence K.; Bensahel; Oliker, Olga (2011). Security Force Assistance in Afghanistan: Identifying Lessons for Future Efforts. RAND Corporation.
- Lieven, Anatol (16 August 2021). "Opinion: Why Afghan Forces So Quickly Laid Down Their Arms". Politico.
- Nyrop, Richard F.; Seekins, Donald M. (January 1986). Area Handbook Series: Afghanistan: A Country Study. Fort Belvoir, VA: Defense Technical Information Center.
- Sedra, Mark (3 November 2016). Security Sector Reform in Conflict-Affected Countries: The Evolution of a Model. Routledge. ISBN 978-1-317-39080-0.
- Tomsen, Peter (2011). The Wars of Afghanistan. Public Affairs.
- United States. Department of Defense (November 2010). "Report on Progress Toward Security and Stability in Afghanistan" (PDF). OCLC 769299266.
- Urban, Mark (1988). War in Afghanistan. Houndmills, Basingstoke, Hampshire: Macmillan Press. pp. 12–14. ISBN 978-0-333-43263-1.
- Zaloga, Steven (2006). Scud Ballistic Missile Launch Systems 1955–2005. Illustrated by Jim Laurier and Lee Ray. Osprey Publishing. ISBN 1-84176-947-9.
