= Kabul Military Training Center =

Training center for the Afghan Armed Forces

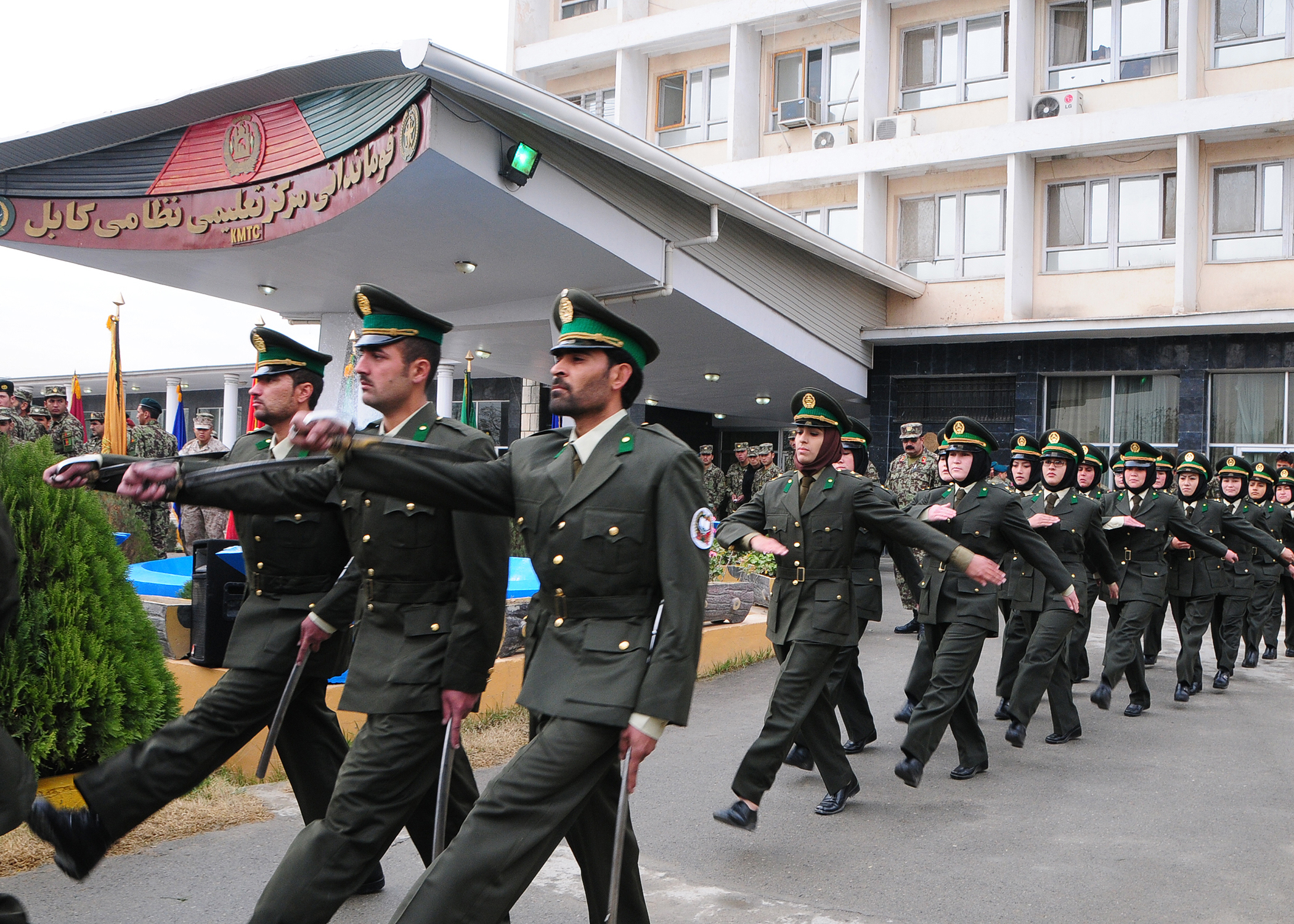
Soldiers of the Afghan National Army marching into their graduation ceremony at the Kabul Military Training Center (KMTC) in 2011.

The Kabul Military Training Center (KMTC) was a basic training centre for the Afghan Armed Forces. Located about 8 miles to the east on the outskirts of Kabul, it offered basic courses including 16-week basic infantry training.

Kabul Military Training Center was one of the biggest basic training centers in Afghanistan. As of April 2008, of the 70,000 Afghans which had entered the Afghan National Army (ANA), a third had been trained at the KMTC between 2007 and 2008.

The Kabul Military Training Center was apparently been dissolved after the collapse of the Islamic Republic of Afghanistan in August 2021.

== Basic training ==
The KMTC undertook basic combat training of new recruits with a 16-week basic training course. Capable of graduating a 615-person battalion every four weeks, there were roughly 2,500 soldiers and airmen undertaking training at any one time.

=== Literacy training ===
A major focus of the development of the Afghan Armed Forces was on raising the levels of literacy among the troops. In 2009 less than 35% of recruits could pass basic weapon qualification due to low literacy levels. Recruits were unable to properly read instructions in order to maintain or operate complex western supplied rifles and additional components such as optics. As a result, recruits had to undertake at least 64 hours of lessons in basic reading, writing and arithmetic in order to pass Grade 1 and move to their units.

Recruits were also given the option of a further 128 hours to advance to grade 2 to bring their total to 192 hours. To achieve Grade 3 they had to undertake a further 120 hours which gave them 312 hours of literacy training in total.

== See also ==
- List of Afghan Armed Forces installations
