= Afghanistan National Disaster Management Authority =

Government agency of Afghanistan

- Dari: اداره ملی مبارزه با حوادث افغانستان; Pashto: د افغانستان د طبیعي پېښو پر وړاندې د مبارزې ملي اداره
- Ministry flag

Agency overview
- Formed: February 16, 1973; 52 years ago
- Jurisdiction: Government of Afghanistan
- Minister responsible: Mohammad Abbas Akhund
- Deputy Ministers responsible: Sharafuddin Taqi; Maulvi Enayatullah
- Agency executive: Shafiullah Rahimi, spokesman
- Website: andma.gov.af/en

The Afghanistan National Disaster Management Authority (ANDMA; Dari: اداره ملی مبارزه با حوادث افغانستان, Pashto: د افغانستان د طبیعي پېښو پر وړاندې د مبارزې ملي اداره) also called the Ministry of Disaster Management, is a ministry and authority of Afghanistan. It was established on 16 February 1973 as the Department of Disaster Preparedness (DDP).

In October 2015, Ghani decided to upgrade the directorate of disaster management to the State Ministry for Disaster Management and appointed Wais Barmak as the minister (he was later replaced). The currently responsible minister is Mohammad Abbas Akhund.

== Ministers ==
Name	Term	Supreme Leader	Ref(s)
Mohammad Abbas Akhund	23 November 2021 – Present	Hibatullah Akhundzada	
