= Mohammad Abbas Akhund =

Afghan politician

Mullah Mohammad Abbas Akhund محمد عباس آخوند

Minister of Disaster Management
- Incumbent
- Assumed office 23 November 2021 (Note: Acting: 23 November 2021 – 15 August 2025)
- Supreme Leader: Hibatullah Akhundzada
- Prime Minister: Hasan Akhund
- Deputy: Sharafuddin Taqi

Minister of Public Health
- In office 1996–2001
- Supreme Leader: Mullah Omar

Personal details
- Born: 1963 (age 62–63) Khas Uruzgan District, Uruzgan Province, Kingdom of Afghanistan
- Party: Taliban
- Occupation: Politician, Taliban member

Mullah Mohammad Abbas Akhund (Pashto: ملا محمد عباس آخند) is an Afghan Taliban politician who served as Acting Minister of Disaster Management of the Islamic Emirate of Afghanistan since 23 November 2021, and reappointed to the position on a permanent basis on 15 August 2025, with the rest of the cabinet. Abbas has also served as Minister of Public Health in the Taliban's previous regime (1996–2001). He is an ethnic Pashtun and belongs to the Achakzai tribe from Spin Boldak district, Kandahar province. He was born in Khas Uruzgan District, Uruzgan Province.
