= Sharafuddin Taqi =

Afghan Deputy Minister of Disaster Management

Maulvi Sharafuddin Taqi شرف الدین تقی

Acting Deputy Minister for Disaster Management
- Incumbent
- Assumed office 23 November 2021
- Supreme Leader: Hibatullah Akhundzada
- Prime Minister: Hassan Akhund (acting)
- Minister: Abbas Akhund (acting)

Commander of the 215 Azam Corps
- Incumbent
- Assumed command 4 October 2021
- Supreme Leader: Hibatullah Akhundzada
- Chief of Staff: Qari Fasihuddin
- Preceded by: New command

Personal details
- Occupation: Politician, Taliban member

Military service
- Allegiance: Islamic Emirate of Afghanistan
- Branch/service: Afghan Army
- Rank: Commander
- Commands: Commander of 215 Azam Corps

Maulvi Sharafuddin Taqi (Pashto: مولوي شرف الدین تقي) is an Afghan Taliban politician, commander and Islamic scholar who is serving as Acting Deputy Minister of Disaster Management of the Islamic Emirate of Afghanistan since 23 November 2021. He is also serving as commander of the 215 Azam Corps of the Islamic Emirate Army since 4 October 2021.
