= Forward Operating Base Delaram =

FOB Delaram ~~FOB Kerella~~
- Delaram, Afghanistan
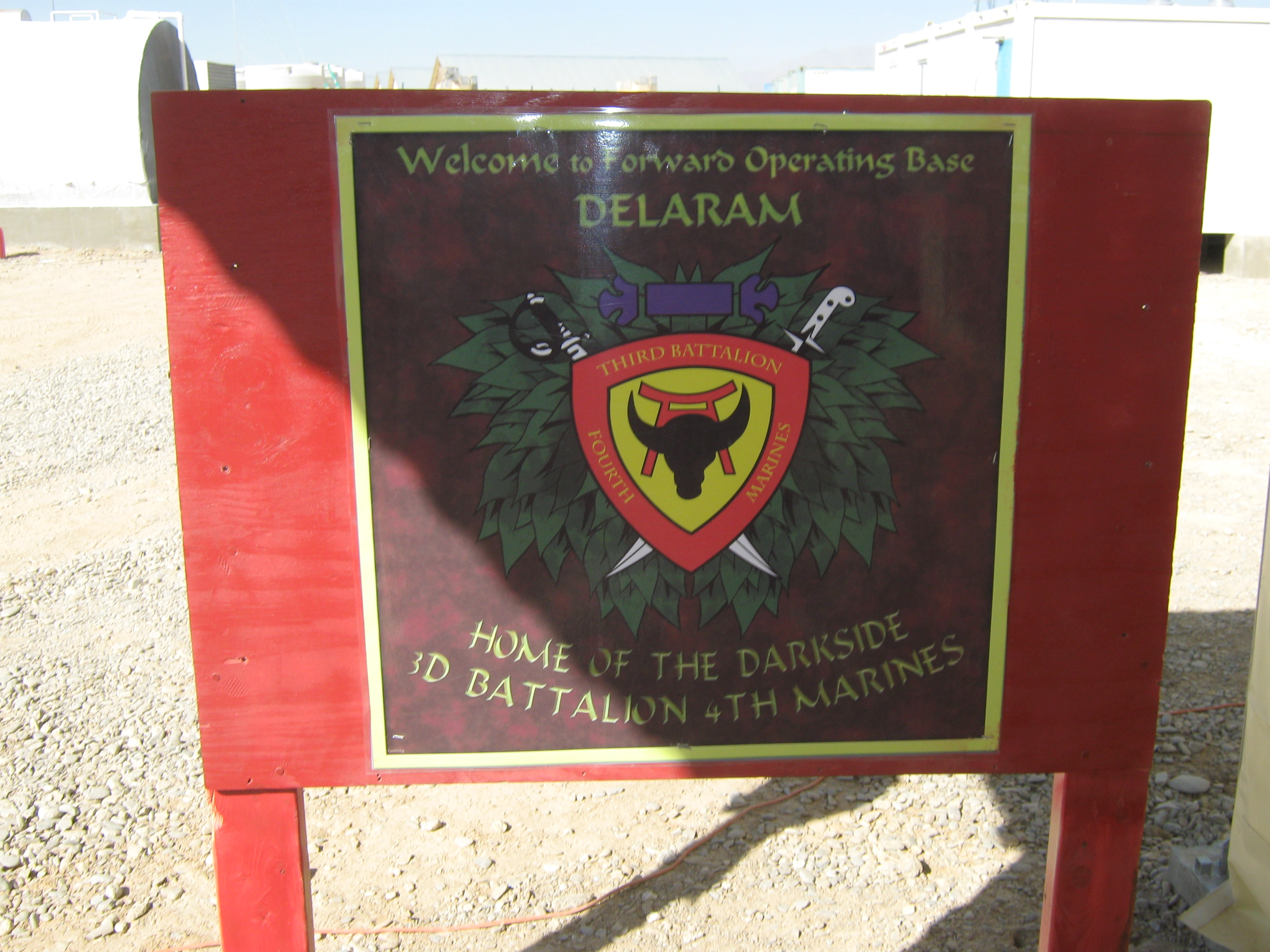
- Sign at the chow hall

Site information
- Type: Forward Operating Base
- Controlled by: United States Marine Corps (USMC); Afghan National Army (ANA)

Site history
- In use: October 2007- 2014

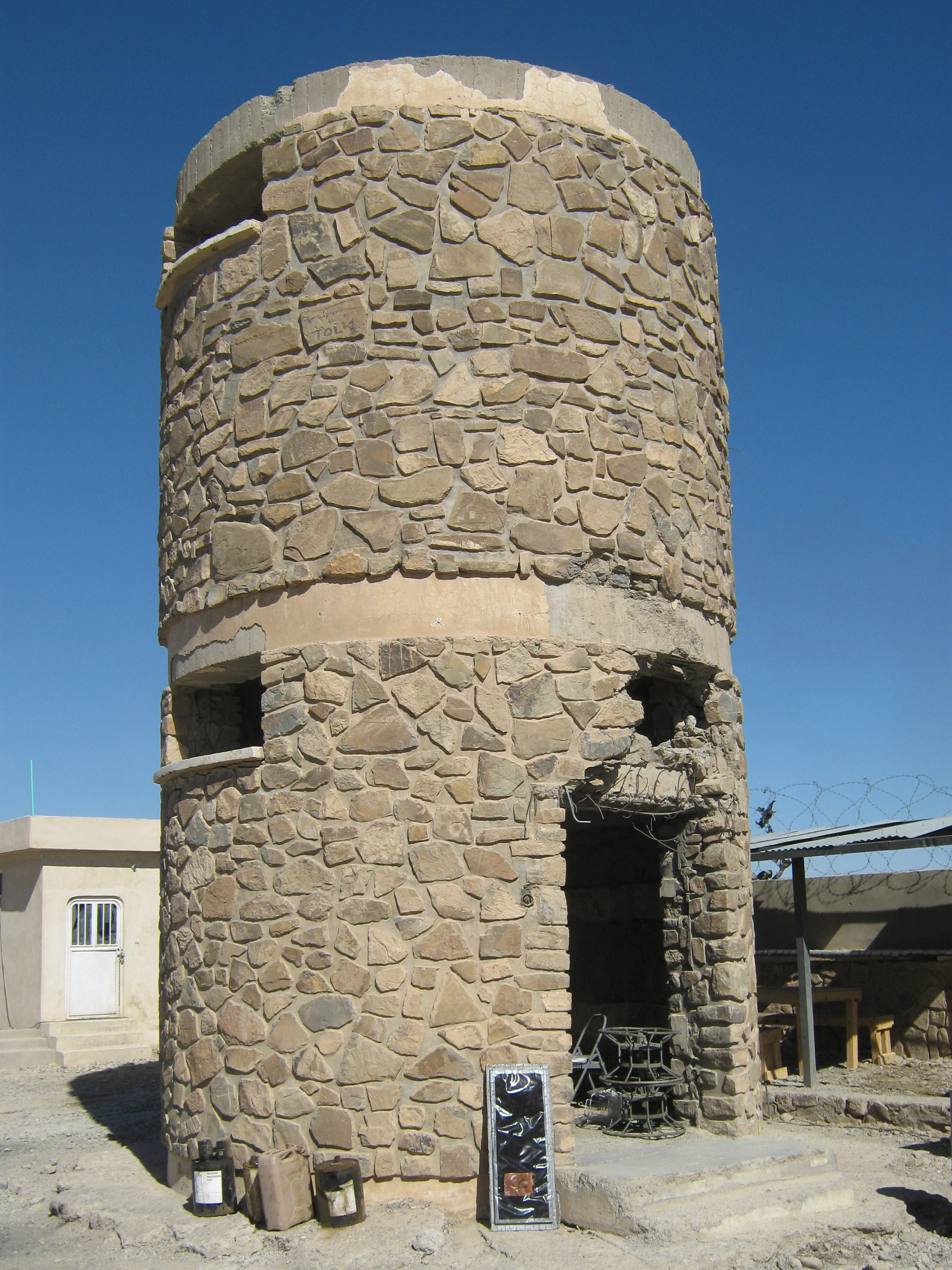
Soviet era tower at FOB Delaram

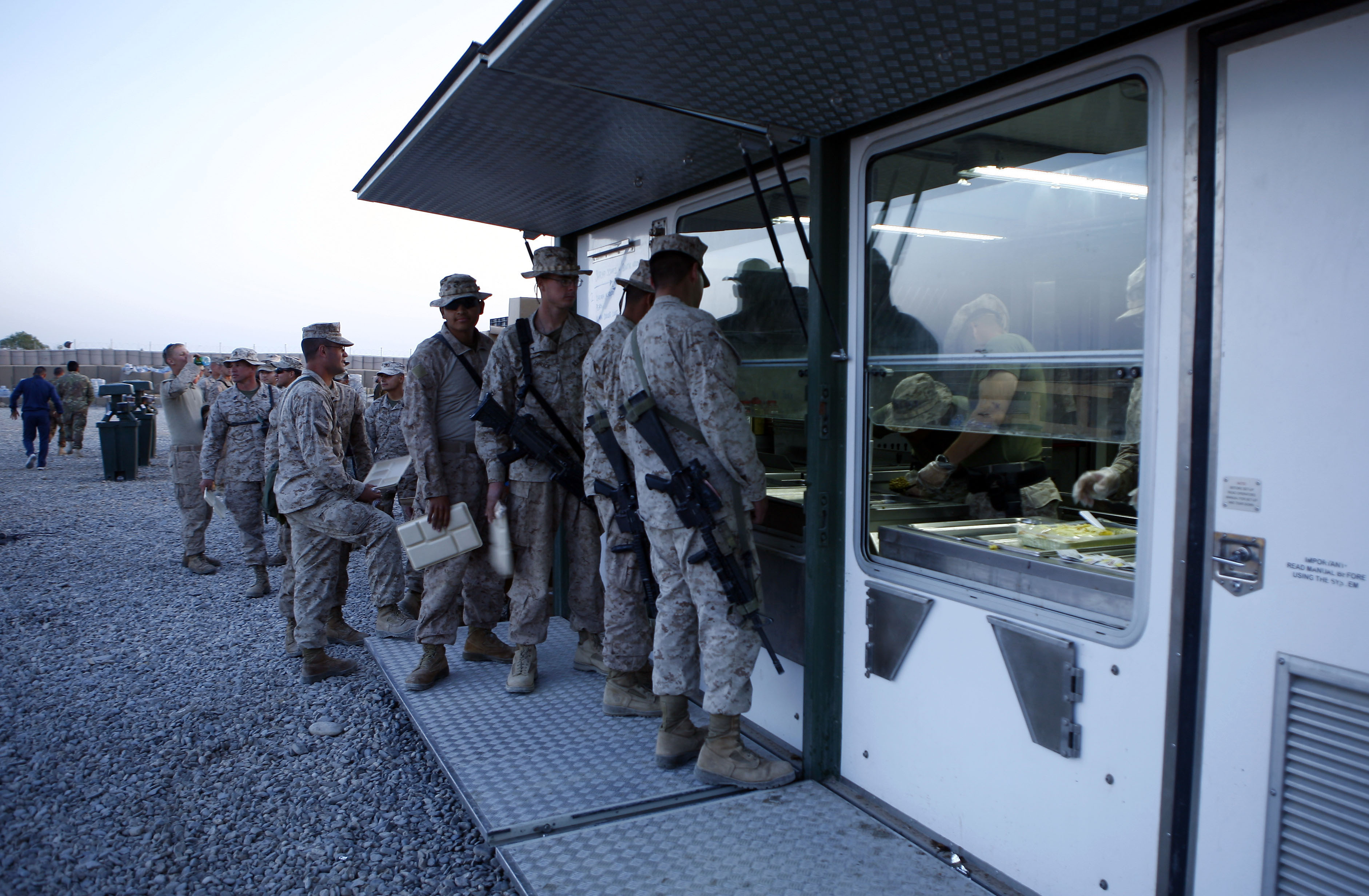
Marines receiving food rations from a field kitchen, 2009

Forward Operating Base Delaram in Afghanistan is a former military expeditionary base built by the United States Marine Corps. It is located on the Ring Road in Delaram. It was transferred to the Afghan National Army in April 2014. It was later the headquarters of 4th Brigade, 215th Corps, which was formed in 2012, prior to the Taliban takeover in 2021.

== History ==
The FOB was originally a Soviet military compound. The Marines named it FOB Kerella, after the first Marine stationed at this FOB to die in Operation Enduring Freedom, Cpl Jason Karella of 2nd Battalion 7th Marines. It was renamed FOB Delaram, after the nearby city, sometime after 2008. Camp Delaram was constructed to accommodate the U.S. Marine Corps. The camp also serves as a storage place for logistics and equipment. The FOB also serves as a focal point for helping Afghans bring their lives back to normal after the attack and still continuing threats from Taliban forces. The initial structure of the base was only temporary and did not have a landing strip for airplanes. An airstrip was later built to allow airplanes to land and bring in passengers and supplies.

== Deployed units ==
- 2nd Battalion, 3rd Marines
- 3rd Battalion, 4th Marines
- 2nd Battalion, 8th Marines
- 3rd Battalion, 8th Marines
- 2nd Battalion, 11th Marines
- 2nd Battalion, 10th Marines
- 2nd Battalion, 14th Marines
- 1st Battalion, 25th Marines
- 3rd Battalion, 7th Marines
- Regimental Combat Team 6
- 5th Battalion, 11th Marines
- 5th Kandak, 2nd Brigade, 215th Corps, Afghan National Army
- Headquarters, 4th Brigade, 215th Corps, Afghan National Army
- F Company (Air Ambulance), 1-169 General Support Aviation Battalion
- 1MARDIV, Headquarters Battalion, MP Company (MPCO), Police Advisory Team
- Marine Air Control Squadron 1 (MACS-1)
- Charlie Company, 1-214th Aviation Regiment, "Weizen Dust-Off" from September 2010 to August 2011.
