= Parameters (journal) =

- Discipline: Military affairs
- Language: English

Publication details
- History: 1971–present
- Publisher: US Army War College (United States)
- Frequency: Quarterly
- Open access: Yes

Standard abbreviations
- ISO 4: Parameters

Indexing
- ISSN: 0031-1723

Links
- Journal homepage

Parameters is a quarterly academic journal published by the United States Army War College (USAWC) Press.

== Background ==
Since 1971, it has published publications based on academic work on strategy, land power, national security and focuses on geostrategic issues. It is also known as The US Army War College Quarterly – Parameters and is the U.S. Army's senior professional journal. Since its creation, it has published 1,073 papers in 907 publications. Parameters is available online through its home page and though ProQuest and UMI.

The current editor in chef is Antulio J. Echevarria II.
