= Presidency of Hamid Karzai =

2001–2014 government of Afghanistan

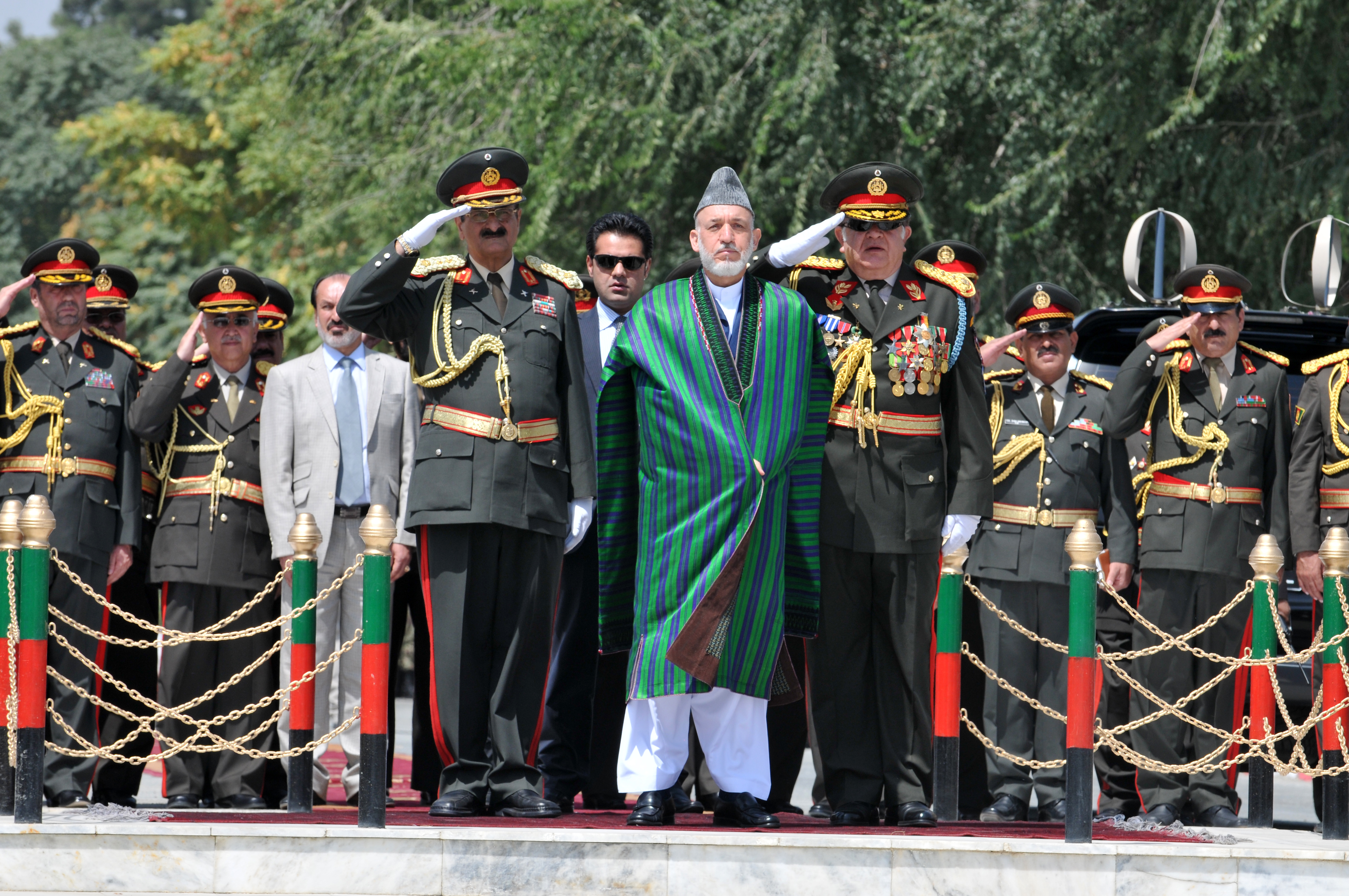
- Karzai observing the honor guard of the Afghan Armed Forces during the 2011 Afghan Independence Day in Kabul
- Presidency of Hamid Karzai; 22 December 2001 – 29 September 2014
- President: Hamid Karzai
- Vice President: Hedayat Amin Arsala; Mohammed Fahim; Nematullah Shahrani; Karim Khalili; Haji Abdul Qadeer; Ahmad Zia Massoud; Yunus Qanuni
- Standard of the President

The Karzai administration was the government of Afghanistan under President Hamid Karzai, who became the head of state of Afghanistan in December 2001 after the Taliban government was overthrown. Karzai was appointed at the 2002 Loya Jirga as the Interim President of the Afghan Transitional Administration. After the 2004 Afghan presidential election, he became the President of Afghanistan.

== President of the transitional government 2001–2004 ==
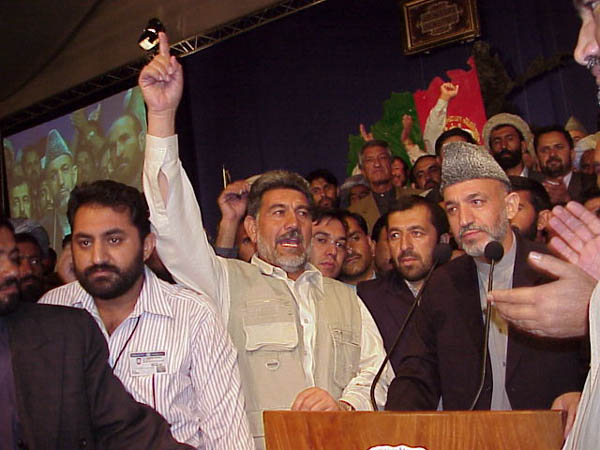
Hamid Karzai appointed as President of the Afghan Transitional Administration at the July 2002 Loya Jirga in Kabul, Afghanistan.

In October 2001, U.S.-led forces invaded Afghanistan. About two months later, the Taliban government was overthrown.

In December 2001, political leaders gathered in Germany to agree on new leadership structures. Under the 5 December Bonn Agreement they formed an interim Transitional Administration and named Karzai Chairman of a 29-member governing committee. He was sworn in as leader on 22 December. The Loya Jirga of 13 June 2002, appointed Karzai Interim holder of the new position as President of the Afghan Transitional Administration.

Karzai re-enacted the original coronation of Ahmad Shah Durrani at the shrine of Sher-i-Surkh outside of Kandahar where he had leaders of various Afghan tribes, including a descendant of the religious leader that originally chose Ahmad Shah Durrani, as key players in this event. Further evidence that Karzai views himself fulfilling a Durrani monarch's role arise from statements furnished by close allies within his government.

Karzai tried to make peace and rebuild trust between communities in Afghanistan after years of war, by representing everyone in a big tent government, including Islamists (many of which were former rivals), former Communists, royalists from the monarchy-era, and ethnic minorities.

== 2004 Afghan presidential election ==
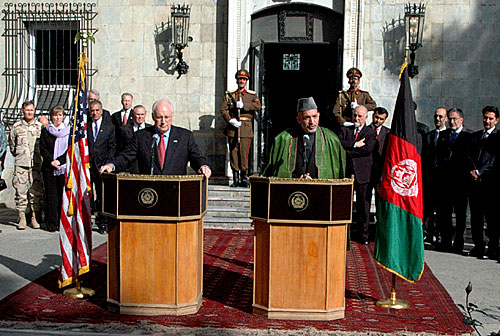
U.S. Vice President Dick Cheney and Hamid Karzai during a news conference on 7 December 2004.

When Karzai was a candidate in the 9 October 2004, presidential election, he won 21 of the 34 provinces, defeating his 22 opponents and becoming the first democratically elected leader of Afghanistan.

Although his campaigning was limited due to fears of violence, elections passed without significant incident. Following investigation by the UN of alleged voting irregularities, the national election commission on 3 November declared Karzai winner, without runoff, with 55.4% of the vote. This represented 4.3 million of the total 8.1 million votes cast. The election took place safely in spite of a surge of insurgent activity.

Karzai was sworn in as President of the Islamic Republic of Afghanistan on 7 December 2004, at a formal ceremony in Kabul. Many interpreted the ceremony as a symbolically important "new start" for the war-torn nation. Notable guests at the inauguration included the country's former King, Zahir Shah, three former US presidents, and U.S. Vice President Dick Cheney.

== President of the Islamic Republic of Afghanistan ==
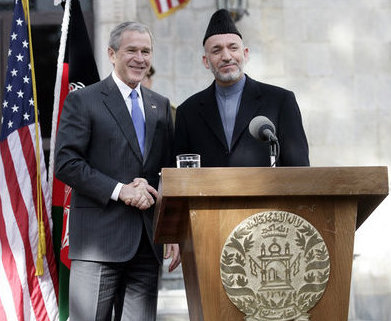
President George W. Bush and Hamid Karzai in Kabul, Afghanistan, on 1 March 2006.

After winning a democratic mandate in the 2004 election and removing many of the former Northern Alliance warlords from his cabinet, it was thought that Karzai would pursue a more aggressively reformist path in 2005. However, Karzai proved to be more cautious than was expected.

Ever since Karzai's new administration took over in 2004, the economy of Afghanistan has been growing rapidly for the first time in many years. Government revenue is increasing every year, although it is still heavily dependent on foreign aid.

On 20 September 2006, Karzai told the United Nations General Assembly that Afghanistan has become the "worst victim" of terrorism. Karzai said terrorism is "rebounding" in his country, with militants infiltrating the borders to wage attacks on civilians. He stated, "This does not have its seeds alone in Afghanistan. Military action in the country will, therefore, not deliver the shared goal of eliminating terrorism." He demanded assistance from the international community to destroy terrorist sanctuaries inside and outside Afghanistan. "You have to look beyond Afghanistan to the sources of terrorism," he told the UN General Assembly, and "destroy terrorist sanctuaries beyond" the country, dismantle the elaborate networks in the region that recruit, indoctrinate, train, finance, arm, and deploy terrorists. These activities are also robbing thousands of Afghan children of their right to education, and prevent health workers from doing their jobs in Afghanistan. In addition he promised to eliminate opium-poppy cultivation in the country, which helps fuel the ongoing insurgency. He has repeatedly demanded that NATO and U.S.-led coalition forces take more care when conducting military operations in residential areas to avoid civilian casualties which undermine his government's already weak standing in parts of the country.

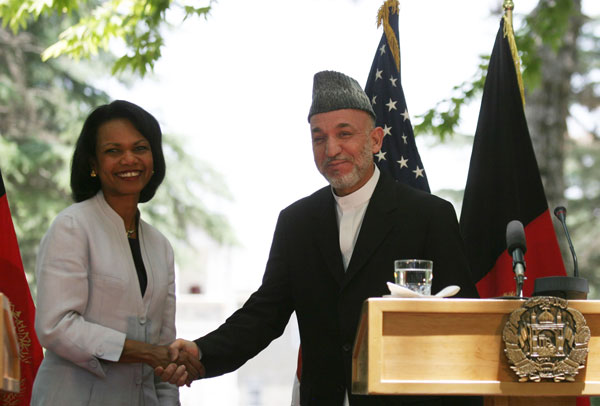
Karzai with U.S. Secretary of State Condoleezza Rice in June 2006.

During the Karzai administration, public discontent grew about corruption and the civilian casualties in the fight against the Taliban insurgency. In May 2006, riots broke out in Kabul, when after a fatal traffic accident in the town involving a US military convoy security forces opened fire on protesters. During the rush, a truck went out of control and crashed into a dozen vehicles in Kabul's northern outskirts, killing at least one person and injuring six. Angry Afghans then threw stones, smashing the windows of the convoy vehicles. Afghan police also opened fire when they came to the assistance of the US troops. Rioters set two police cars alight. At least seven civilians were killed during the protest and 40 wounded. Thousands of protesters marched through the capital shouting slogans against Karzai and the US. By early afternoon, up to 2,000 protesters had gathered in central Kabul, some marching on parliament and some on the presidential palace. Several hundred more congregated at an intersection near the US embassy. A few dozen people forced their way past a police cordon guarding the road to the US embassy and threw stones at vehicles carrying foreigners into the compound, prompting the occupants to fire into the air before turning back. The unrest left at least seven people dead and 40 injured.

In a video broadcast on 24 September 2006, Karzai stated that if the money wasted on the Iraq War was actually spent on rebuilding Afghanistan, his country would "be in heaven in less than one year". In May 2007, after as many as 51 Afghan civilians were killed in a bombing, Karzai asserted that his government "can no longer accept" casualties caused by the US and NATO operations.

=== Assassination attempts ===
- 5 September 2002: An assassination attempt was made on Hamid Karzai in Kandahar City. A gunman wearing the uniform of the new Afghan National Army opened fire, wounding Gul Agha Sherzai (former governor of Kandahar) and an American Special Operations officer. One of the President's bodyguards, a bystander who knocked down the gunman, and the gunman himself were killed when Karzai's American bodyguards returned fire. Recently, some pictures of the US Navy's DEVGRU responding to the attempt have surfaced. Allegedly, one of their members was wounded.
- 16 September 2004: An assassination was attempted on Karzai when a rocket missed the helicopter he was flying in while en route to Gardez.
- 10 June 2007: The Taliban attempted to assassinate Karzai in Ghazni where Karzai was giving a speech to elders. The Taliban fired approximately 12 rockets, some of which landed 220 yards (200 m) away from the crowd. Karzai was not hurt in the incident and was transported away from the location after finishing his speech.
- 27 April 2008: Insurgents, reportedly from the Haqqani network, used automatic weapons and rocket-propelled grenades to attack a military parade that Karzai was attending in Kabul. Karzai was safe, but at least three people were killed, including a parliamentarian, a ten-year-old girl, and a minority leader, and ten injured. Others attending the event included government ministers, former warlords, diplomats and the military top brass, all of whom had gathered to mark the 16th anniversary of the fall of the Afghan communist government to the mujahideen. Responding to the attack during the ceremony, the United Nations said the attackers "have shown their utter disrespect for the history and people of Afghanistan." Taliban spokesman Zabiullah Mujahid claimed responsibility for the attack, stating, "We fired rockets at the scene of the celebration." He went on to say there were 6 Taliban at the scene and that 3 were killed. "Our aim was not to directly hit someone," Mujahed said when asked if the intention was to kill Karzai. "We just wanted to show to the world that we can attack anywhere we want to."

=== Foreign relations ===
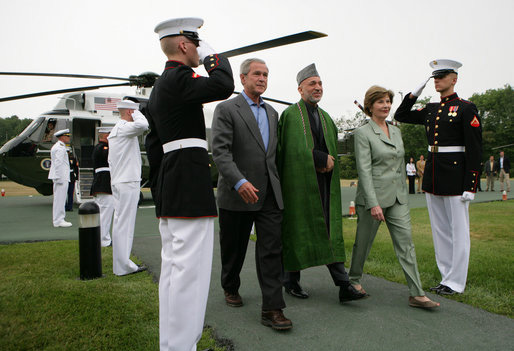
Karzai with former US President George W. Bush and wife Laura Bush at Camp David on 5 August 2007.

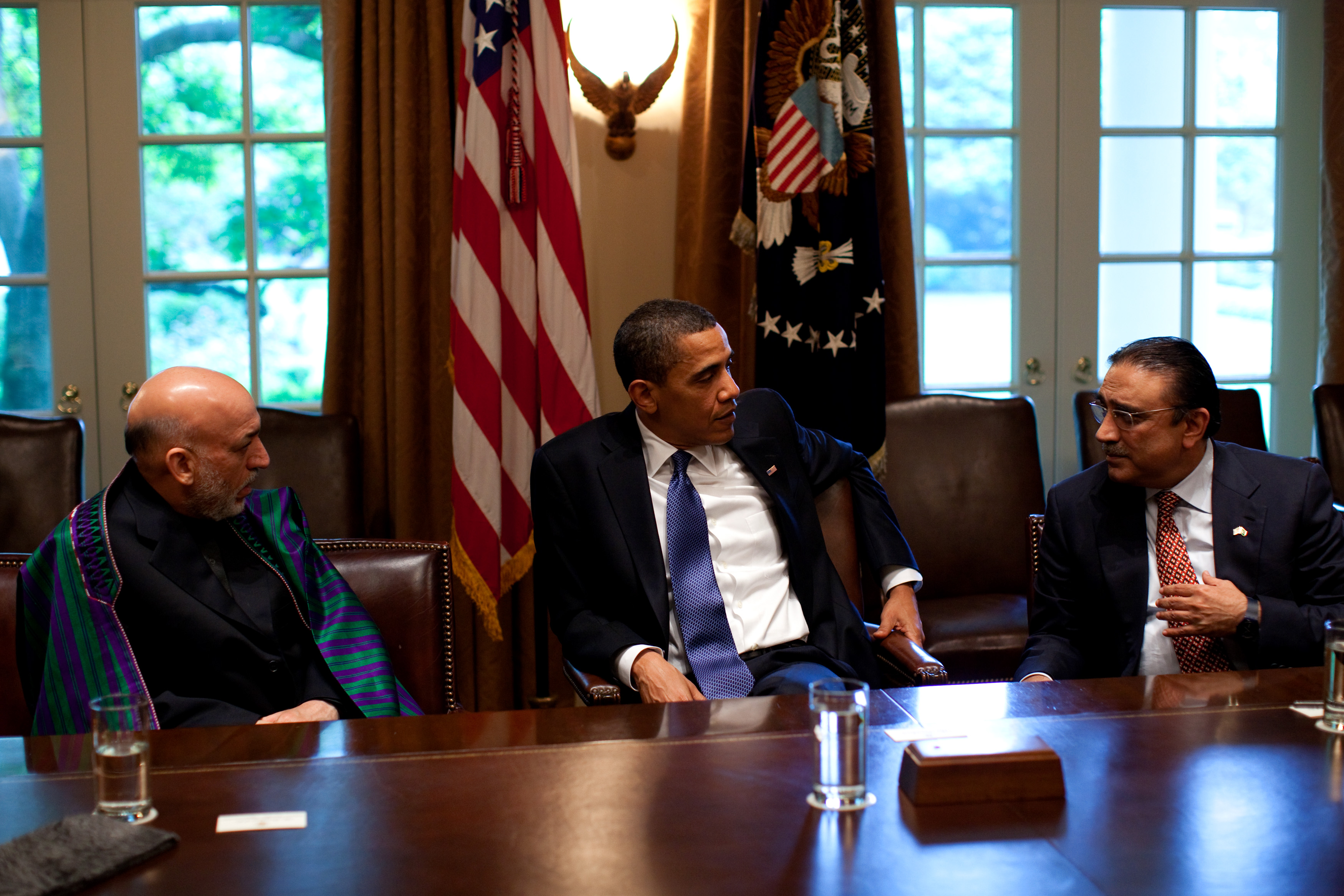
Karzai with US President Barack Obama and Pakistani President Asif Ali Zardari during a US-Afghan-Pakistan Trilateral meeting at the White House in Washington, D.C.

Karzai's relations with the United States were the strongest, because the U.S. was the leading nation helping to rebuild Afghanistan. The United States helped put him in office in late 2001 to lead his nation. Karzai's relations with Pakistan were also strong, especially with Pakistan's Awami National Party (ANP). In December 2007, Karzai and his delegates travelled to Islamabad, Pakistan, for a usual meeting with Pervez Musharraf on trade ties and intelligence sharing between the two Islamic states. Karzai also met and had a 45-minute talk with Benazir Bhutto on the morning of 27 December, hours before her trip to Liaquat National Bagh, where she was assassinated after her speech. After Bhutto's death, Karzai called her his sister and a brave woman who had a clear vision "for her own country, for Afghanistan, and for the region – a vision of democracy, prosperity, and peace." In September 2008, Karzai was invited on a special visit to witness the swearing in ceremony of Asif Ali Zardari, who became the new President of Pakistan. Relations between Afghanistan and Pakistan have improved since PPP members Zardari and Yousaf Raza Gillani took office. The two nations often make contacts with one another concerning the war on terrorism and trade. Pakistan even allowed NATO forces stationed in Afghanistan to launch attacks on illegal militant groups in Pakistan. This was something strongly opposed by the previous government of Pakistan. The two states finally signed into law the long-awaited Afghanistan–Pakistan Transit Trade Agreement in 2011, which among other things allow shipment truck to travel from one state to the other.

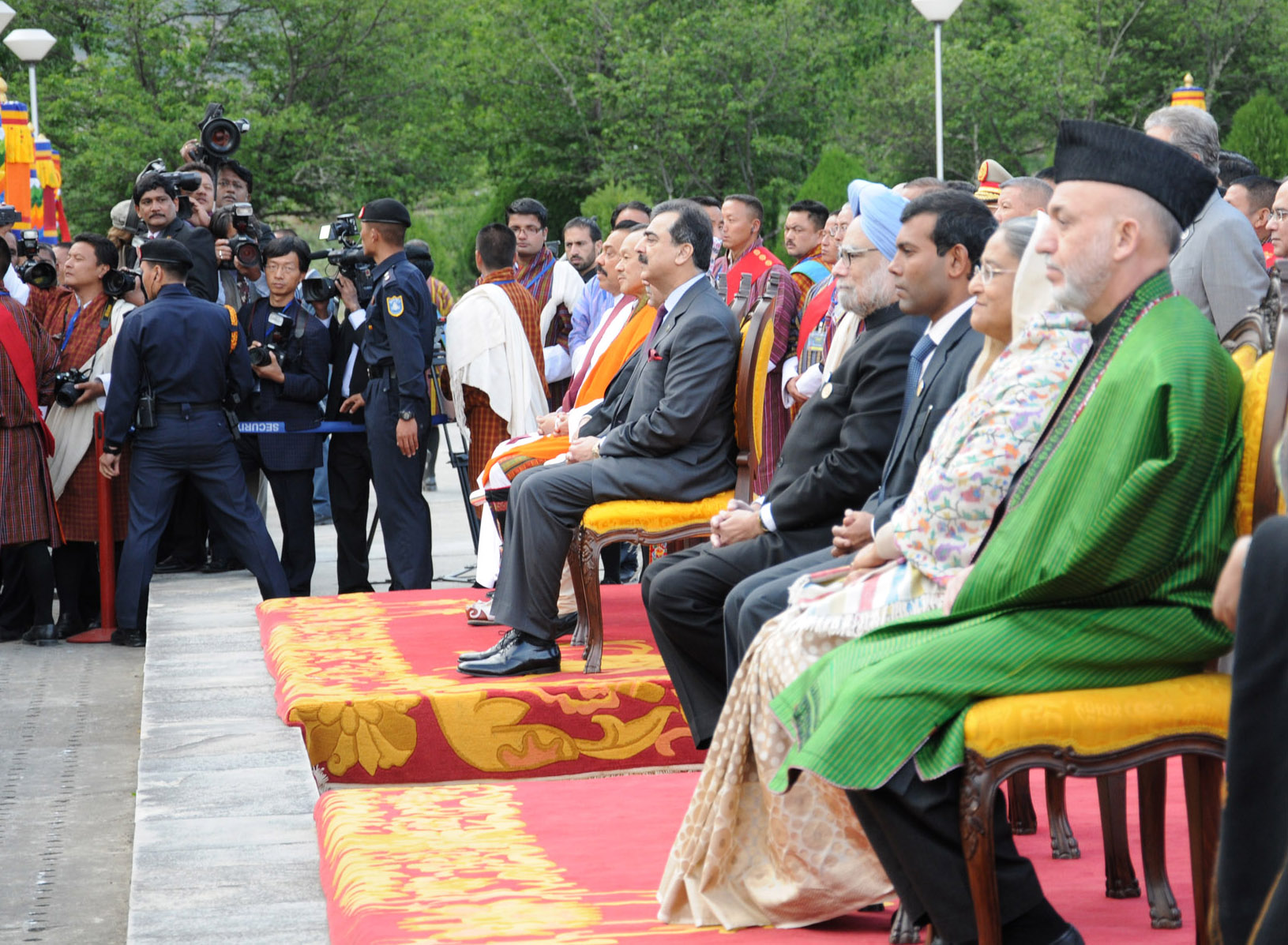
Hamid Kazarai in Bhutan, 2010

Although the U.S. and others often charge that Iran is meddling in Afghanistan's affairs, Karzai stated that Iran is a friend despite Iranian-made weapons being found in his country.

We did interdict a shipment, without question the Revolutionary Guard's core Quds Force, through a known Taliban facilitator. Three of the individuals were killed... 48 122 millimetre rockets were intercepted with their various components... Iranians certainly view as making life more difficult for us if Afghanistan is unstable. We don't have that kind of relationship with the Iranians. That's why I am particularly troubled by the interception of weapons coming from Iran. But we know that it's more than weapons; it's money; it's also according to some reports, training at Iranian camps as well. – General David Petraeus, Commander of US-NATO forces in Afghanistan, 16 March 2011

In 2007, Karzai said that Iran, so far, has been a helper in the reconstruction process. On 5 August 2007, Karzai was invited to Camp David in Maryland, USA, for a special meeting with U.S. President George W. Bush. In October 2007, Karzai again rejected Western accusations against Iran, stating, "We have resisted the negative propaganda launched by foreign states against the Islamic Republic, and we stress that aliens' propaganda should not leave a negative impact on the consolidated ties between the two great nations of Iran and Afghanistan." Karzai added, "The two Iranian and Afghan nations are close to each other due to their bonds and commonalities, they belong to the same house, and they will live alongside each other for good." However, just a year prior Karzai warned that, "Iran, Pakistan, and others are not fooling anyone."

If they don't stop, the consequences will be ... that the region will suffer with us equally. In the past we have suffered alone; this time everybody will suffer with us.... Any effort to divide Afghanistan ethnically or weaken it will create the same thing in the neighboring countries. All the countries in the neighborhood have the same ethnic groups that we have, so they should know that it is a different ball game this time. --Hamid Karzai, 17 February 2006

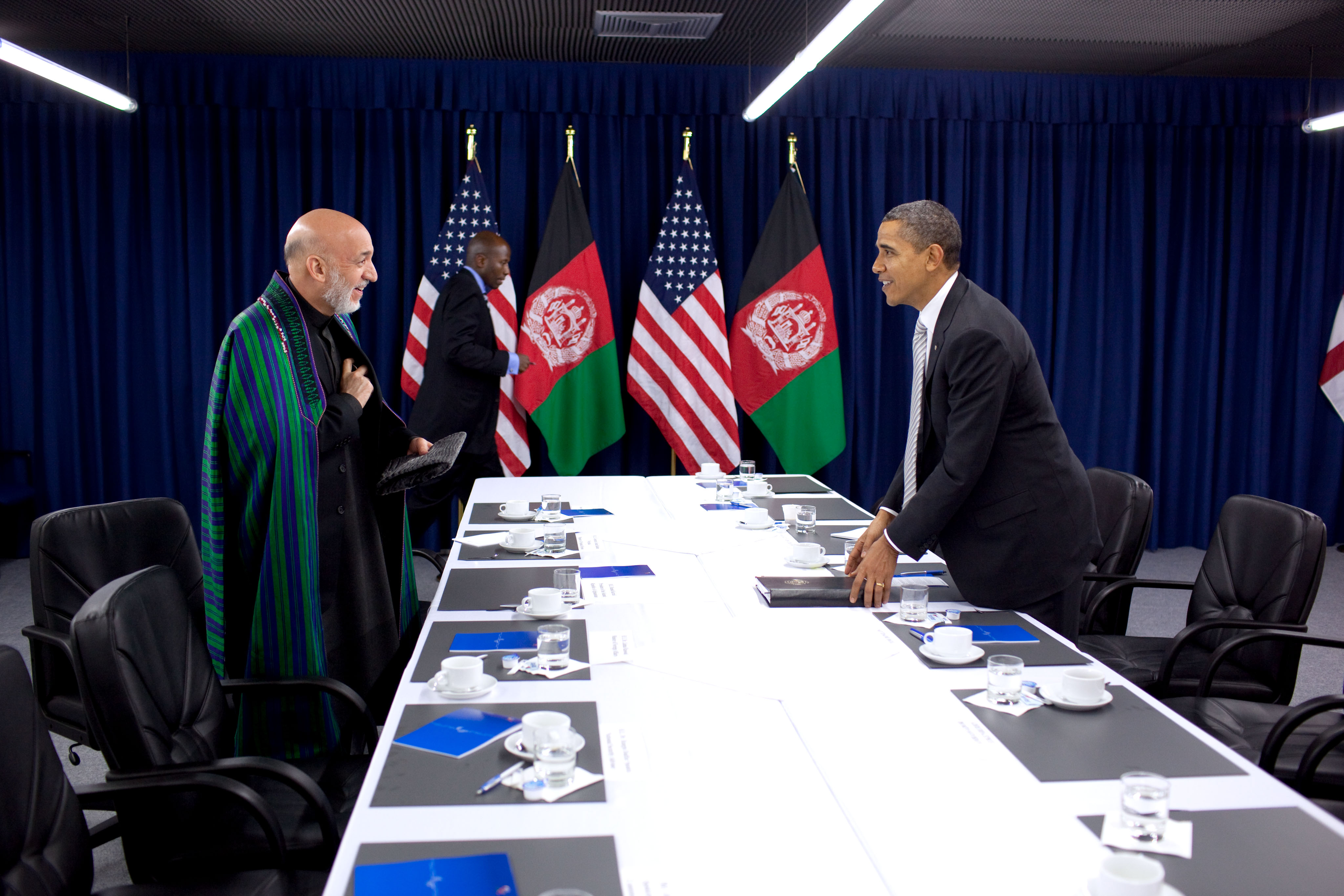
President Barack Obama and Karzai at a meeting at the NATO Summit in November 2010.

Some international criticism has centered around the government of Karzai in early 2009 for failing to secure the country from Taliban attacks, systemic governmental corruption, and most recently, widespread claims of electoral fraud in the 2009 Afghan presidential election. Karzai staunchly defended the election balloting, stating that some statements criticizing the balloting and vote count were "totally fabricated." He told the media that, "There were instances of fraud, no doubt... There were irregularities... But the election as a whole was good and free and democratic." He further went on to say that, "Afghanistan has its separate problems and we have to handle them as Afghanistan finds it feasible... This country was completely destroyed... Today, we are talking about fighting corruption in Afghanistan, improved legal standards... You see the glass half empty or half full. I see it as half full. Others see it as half empty."

In June 2010, Karzai travelled to Japan for a five-day visit where the two nations discussed a new aid provided by the hosting nation and the untapped mineral resources recently announced. Karzai invited Japanese companies such as Mitsubishi and others to invest in Afghan mining projects. He told Japanese officials that Japan would be given priority in the bid to explore its resources. He stated, "morally, Afghanistan should give access as a priority to those countries that have helped Afghanistan massively in the past few years." While in Japan, Karzai also made his first visit to Hiroshima to pray for the atomic bomb victims. Japan has provided billions of dollars in aid to Afghanistan since the beginning of 2002. In October 2010, Karzai acknowledged that the Government of Iran has been providing millions of dollars directly to his office.

== 2009 re-election campaign ==
In the second presidential election, held on 20 August 2009, Karzai was announced to have received just over 50% of the votes. However the election was characterized by lack of security, low voter turnout and widespread ballot stuffing, intimidation, and other electoral fraud.

Two months later, under heavy U.S. and ally pressure, Karzai accepted calls for a second round run-off vote, which was announced for 7 November 2009. On 2 November 2009 election officials announced the cancellation of the run-off race and declared Karzai the winner due to the withdrawal of Abdullah Abdullah, Karzai's run-off opponent, from the process.

=== New cabinet in 2010 ===
In November 2009 Afghanistan's attorney-general revealed that 15 current and former cabinet ministers are under investigation for alleged corruption. After the fraud-plagued election, and with these allegations Karzai desperately needed to restore his legitimacy at home and abroad. Karzai's inauguration on 19 November 2009 was an austere event, without overt celebrations. During his inauguration speech, he pledged to "end the culture of impunity and violation of law and bring to justice those involved in spreading corruption and abuse" and make it "obligatory for senior government officials to identify the sources of their assets and to declare their properties in a transparent manner". Western officials publicly said his lineup of minister candidates would be a first vital test to show whether he was serious about combating corruption, which undermined his government's credibility and fed the Taliban insurgency.

The Obama administration urged Karzai to exclude ineffective or corrupt officials, while powerful Afghans who helped deliver his re-election were demanding positions, including the Uzbek warlord, Abdul Rashid Dostum. Karzai was expected to retain the heads of high-profile ministries including Defense and Interior, who were regarded in Washington as experienced professionals. In addition to that the finance, intelligence and education ministers were also to remain in office. All of them were given a U.S. approval by Secretary of State Hillary Rodham Clinton, when she attended Karzai's inauguration in November 2009. Analysts said that Karzai also made promises to the former warlords and tribal leaders who backed his campaign and expected government positions in return. The governor of Nangahar, Gul Agha Sherzai would have been seduced to become a supporter in his re-election by the promise of an influential position: he could become the new mayor of Kabul.

==== First list of candidates ====
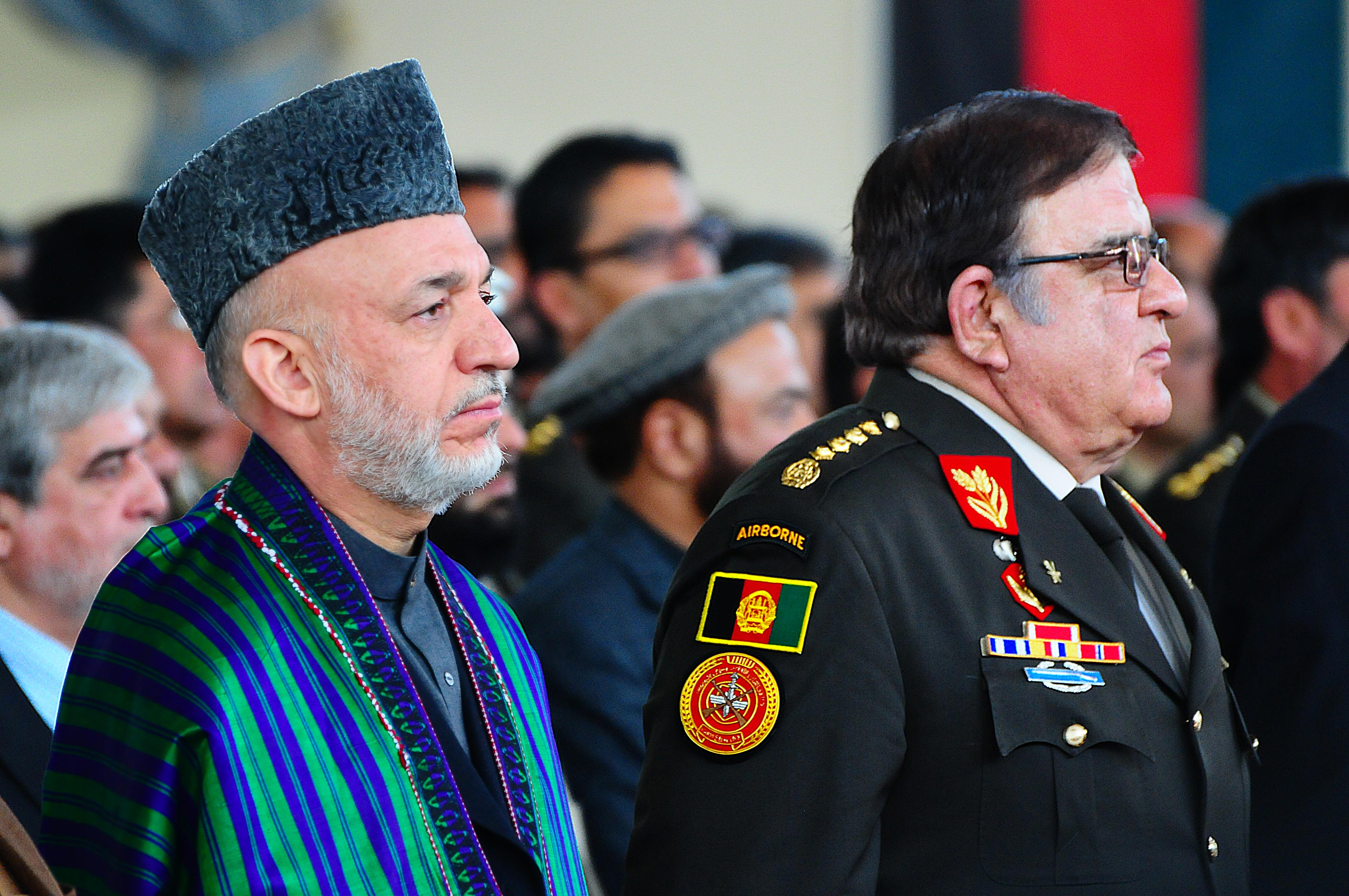
Afghan President Hamid Karzai and Abdul Rahim Wardak, the Defense Minister of Afghanistan.

The new names on the cabinet list included several relatively unknown figures in less influential jobs, and one parliament member said some were associates of some of the power brokers who supported Karzai's re-election. No senior positions would be given to supporters of opposition leader and rival Abdullah Abdullah. It is alleged that Karzai planned to keep the disputed Foreign Minister Spanta until the International Afghanistan Conference in London on 28 January 2010. Shortly before Karzai presented his list with nominees, the Wolesi Jirga, the lower house of the Afghan parliament, after three days of debating, decided against giving trust vote to ministers with dual citizenship.

When Karzai finally presented his list of 24 cabinet nominees to the Afghan parliament on 19 December, since according to the Afghan Constitution each nominee of ministerial appointments has to win a vote of confidence from the Lower House, it retained some leaders supported by the West, but also several viewed as incompetent and even two that had been accused of involvement in the fraud that tainted the election. In August 2009 Karzai replaced Muhammad Ibrahim Adel, the minister of mines, who was being investigated for allegedly taking more than $20 million in bribes to help a Chinese firm win a lucrative contract. Karzai also replaced Sadiq Chakari, the religious affairs minister who was accused in taking part in a kickback scam involving Afghan pilgrims to Mecca.

According to political analysts, the list was "not encouraging", but it reflected realpolitik. Slightly more than half were ministers who would stay in their current positions or who had served previously in Karzai's government. At least one known former warlord, Ismail Khan, was nominated to serve again as the minister of electricity and water. Karzai asked the parliament to create a new Ministry for Martyr and Disabled Affairs. At a news conference with the Belgian prime minister Leterme he also announced that he planned to create a ministry to fight illiteracy, and that he intended to nominate a woman to head it. Female politicians would also be appointed to preside several independent commissions and deputy minister's posts.

The Wolesi Jirga or Lower House of the Afghan parliament voted on the candidates in two sessions. The sessions were attended by 232 out of the 239 MPs. According to the law 50+1 (117) votes were necessary for acceptance.

On 2 January 2010, a crisis emerged, when the count of the votes made clear that the parliament rejected two-thirds of the nominated persons. Of the 24 nominees introduced to parliament, only seven were accepted. The rejected nominees could not be put forward again and Afghanistan could remain without a complete government until parliament returns from a recess in seven weeks' time The Afghan parliament would begin a 45-day winter vacation from 5 January). On 4 January, Karzai requested the parliament to delay its winter recess, so members could consider new nominees. The parliament decided to take a short break of three days and demanded Karzai to come up with a list of names, including a candidate for the post of Foreign Affairs.

President Hamid Karzai's nominations for his second cabinet First nominations were on 19 December 2009 and the second ones on 9 January 2010
	Ministry	Name	Incumbent / New	Parliamentary vote of confidence					
	Ministry	Name	Incumbent / New	result	Yes	No	Abstain	invalid	Disappeared
1	Foreign Affairs	not nominated							
1	Foreign Affairs	Zalmai Rassoul	new	check					
2	Defense	Abdul Rahim Wardak	incumbent	check	124	100	8	-	-
3	Interior	Mohammad Hanif Atmar	incumbent	check	147	77	-	rest	-
4	Economy	Anwar ul-Haq Ahady	new	X mark	91	103	7	3	1
4	Economy	Abdul Hadi Arghandiwal	new	check					
5	Finance	Omar Zakhilwal	incumbent	check	141	84	6	-	-
6	Public Health	Mohammad Amin Fatemi	incumbent	X mark	102	120	5	3	2
6	Public Health	Soraya Dalil	new	X mark					
7	Information and Culture	Sayed Makhdum Rahin	new	check	120	93	14	4	-
8	Energy and Water	Ismail Khan	incumbent	X mark	111	109	5	5	-
9	Mines	Waheedullah Sharani	new	check	140	78	13	1	-
10	Education	Ghulam Farooq Wardak	incumbent	check	155	73	3	-	-
11	Justice	Mohammad Sarwar Danish	incumbent	X mark					
11	Justice	Habibullah Ghaleb	new	check					
12	Communications and Information Technology	Amirzai Sangin	incumbent	X mark	92	130	8	1	-
12	Communications and Information Technology	Abdul Qadus Hamidi	new	X mark					
13	Commerce and Industries	Ghulam Mohammad Aylaqi	new	X mark	76	138	13	4	1
13	Commerce and Industries	Zahir Waheed	new	X mark					
14	Agriculture	Mohammad Asef Rahimi	incumbent	check	136	89	3	2	2
15	Women Affairs	Husn Bano Ghazanfar	incumbent	X mark	115	108	8	1	-
15	Women Affairs	Palwasha Hassan	new	X mark					
16	Returnees and Refugees	Enayatullah Nazari	new	X mark	82	133	11	3	3
16	Returnees and Refugees	Abdul Rahim	new	X mark					
17	Islamic Affairs	Enayatullah Baligh	new	X mark	108	115	6	2	-
17	Islamic Affairs	Mohammad Yasouf Neyazi	new	check					
18	Border and Tribal Affairs	Sayed Hamid Gailani	new	X mark	70	149	11	2	-
18	Border and Tribal Affairs	Arsala Jamal	new	X mark					
19	Counter Narcotics	General Khodaidad	incumbent	X mark	36	176	17	3	1
19	Counter Narcotics	Zara Ahmad Muqbel	new	check					
20	Higher Education	Obaidullah Obaid	new	X mark	94	121	12	5	-
20	Higher Education	Muhammad Hashim Esmatullahi	new	X mark					
21	Public Works	Mirza Hussain Abdullahi	new	X mark	33	179	17	2	-
21	Public Works	Mohammad Bashir Lali	new	X mark					
22	Rural Rehabilitation and Development	Wais Ahmad Barmak	new	X mark	90	127	9	4	2
22	Rural Rehabilitation and Development	Jarullah Mansoori	new	check					
23	Labour and Social Affairs	Mohammad Esmail Monshi	new	X mark	39	176	14	2	1
23	Labour and Social Affairs	Amina Afzali	new	check					
24	Transport	Mohammadullah Batash	new	X mark	82	138	10	3	-
24	Transport	Abdul Rahim Horas	new	X mark					
25	Urban Development	not nominated							
25	Urban Development	Sultan Hussain Nasiri	new	X mark					

==== Second list of candidates ====
On 9 January 2010, Karzai presented his second list of candidates to the Wolesi Jirga, including one to replace the Minister of Foreign Affairs, Spanta. Three of the new nominees were women, for the posts of Women's Affairs, Public Health, and Disabled and Martyr portfolios – the only woman on the first list of candidates was rejected. Pelwasha Hassan, a prominent activist, was now chosen by him as minister of women's affairs. Karzai had been sharply criticized when his previous line-up had only one woman. Only names for the Ministry of Energy and Water or the Ministry of Telecommunications were still lacking.

Among the new nominees was Abdul Hadi Arghandiwal, as candidate for the post of economics. Arghandiawal is the chairman of a party that is an offshoot of the Hezb-i-Islami movement, who was accused before of having contacts with warlord Gulbuddin Hekmatyar. This choice could be in line with Karzai's desire fore reconciliation with insurgents willing to lay down their arms and join the political system.

After the second list of candidates was offered, several parliament members expressed discontent about the quality of the nominees, and analysts predicted a new crisis. According to analysts the new nominees represented a cross-section of Afghanistan's ethnic mix of Pashtun, Uzbek, Tajik and Hazara, but the common thread would be their inexperience. On 16 January, the parliament rejected more than half of the second slate of candidates. Among the approved nominees were Foreign Minister Zalmay Rasoul, Justice Minister Habibullah Ghalib, Minister for Economy Arghandiwal and Minister for Counter-Narcotics Zarar Ahmad, but 10 out of the 17 candidates were voted down. The only woman approved was Amena Afzali as minister for Public Works, Martyrs and the Disabled.

On 17 January, the Afghan parliament prolonged uncertainty by shutting for its winter recess until 20 February, without waiting for President Karzai to fill the rest of his cabinet.

Portfolio	Minister
Foreign Affairs	Zalmay Rasoul
Justice	Habibullah Ghaleb
Public Health	Suraya Dalil
Women's Affairs	Pelwasha Hassan
Higher Education	Mohammad Hashim Esmatullahi
Economy	Abdul Hadi Arghandiwal
Hajj and Mosque/Religious Affairs	Mohammad Yasouf Neyazi
Refugees and Repatriation	Abdul Rahim
Transportation and Civil Aviation	Abdul Rahim Horas
Commerce	Mohammad Hadi Hakimi
Public Welfare	Mohammad Bashir Lali
Work and Social Affairs/Martyred and Disabled	Amina Afzali
Border and Tribal Affairs	Arsaleh Jamal
Development and Rural Affairs	Janullah Mansouri
Counternarcotics	Zarar Ahmad Moqbel
Urban Development	Sultan Hussain Nasery

On 26 January 2010, on the eve of the International Afghanistan Conference in London Karzai set the framework for dialogue with Taliban leaders when he called on the group's leadership to take part in a "Loya Jirga" – or large assembly of elders—to initiate peace talks. A Taliban spokesman declined to talk in detail about Karzai's plans and only said the militants would make a decision "soon" about his offer.

== Second term as President of the Islamic Republic of Afghanistan 2009-2014 ==
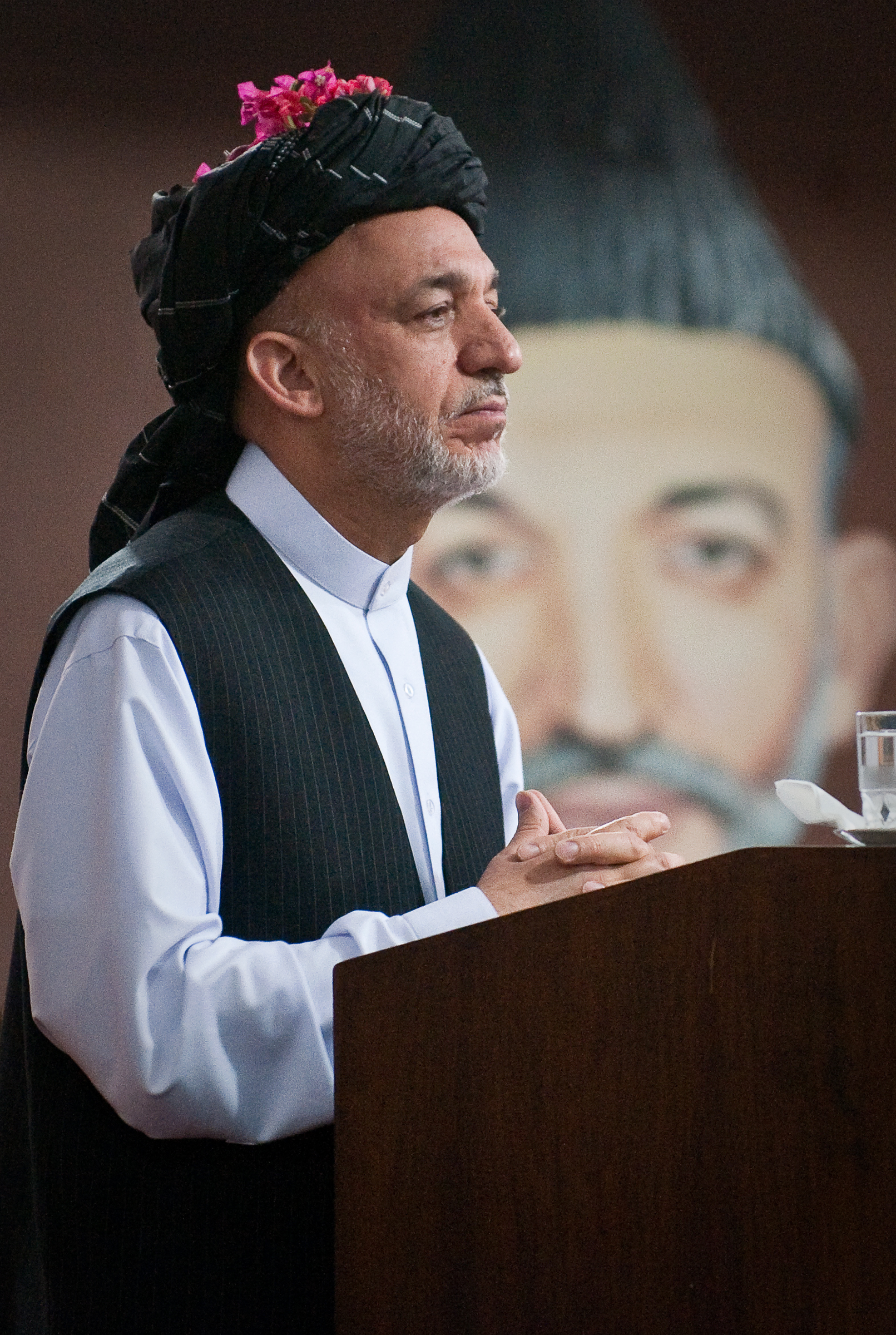
Karzai speaking at a shura to tribal and religious leaders in Kandahar, the core area of Taliban insurgency.

The beginning of the second term of Karzai was marked by his problems with forming a new cabinet approved by the parliament (see above), the International Afghanistan Conference in London on 28 January 2010, the announcement to hold a "Peace Jirga", the Operation Moshtarak in Southern Afghanistan in February 2010, the International Conference on Afghanistan in Kabul in July 2010, and the spread of the Taliban insurgency to the northern provinces of the country.

On 15 February 2010, the American newspaper Washington Post published an obtained draft of changes to the Afghan election law that was presented at a cabinet meeting earlier that month. This thorough rewriting of the current law dating from 2005 proposed to remove all three foreign members from the Electoral Complaints Commission: one member would be chosen by the Supreme Court, two by the parliament, one by the Afghan Independent Human Rights Commission and one by the president. In the presidential elections of 2009, the five-member ECC—including three international members appointed by the U.N. envoy to Afghanistan – calculated that Karzai lost his first-round majority by the amount of vote-rigging and would need to face a run-off. The proposal would also limit the fixed number of women in Wolesi Jirga (Lower House) to a maximum of two per each of the country's 34 provinces. Further the proposal intended to establish restrictive qualifications for presidential candidates: they should have a bachelor's degree and a "good reputation" and be a "wise and brave person" and not been "affected by psychic diseases." Presidential candidates would also have to deposit a bail of 5 million Afghanis (about $100,000), to be refunded only if the candidate wins or receives at least 20 percent of the vote (of the 32 candidates listed by the election commission in 2009, only two cleared this threshold). Karzai's spokesman Wahid Omar said that amendments were approved by the cabinet and sent to the Ministry of Justice. Karzai could sign a decree on the changes while the parliament had its winter recess.

In March 2010 the president's office admitted that it had entered into force without Karzai's signature the National Reconciliation Charter that the Afghan parliament passed in 2007, granting immunity from prosecution to combatants in past conflicts since the Soviet's invasion in 1979 ([in 2005, Human Rights Watch documented one particularly grisly period in 1992–93 in its report "Blood Stained Hands: Past Atrocities in Kabul and Afghanistan's Legacy of Impunity"). This law was not signed off by him because of the many objections that were raised by domestic and international rights groups. The resolution which was passed earlier by the lower house of Parliament, Wolesi Jirga, on 31 January 2007 provided impunity to the war criminals including Taliban leader Mullah Mohammed Omar.

In September 2012, Karzai fired and hired 10 provincial governors in an attempt to improve governance and stop corruption on the local level. This came weeks after he replaced Afghan security officials to take better control of state machinery and key ministries. One of the fired governors was Mohammad Gulab Mangal, who was in charge of the Taliban-filled Helmand Province and had both American and British support. Afghan's international supporters have previously requested improvements in the local administrations.

Karzai's second term as president ended on 29 September 2014. He was succeeded by Ashraf Ghani and his presidency.

== See also ==
- Politics of Afghanistan
- List of presidents of Afghanistan
