= Ministry of Finance (Afghanistan) =

Ministry in the government of Afghanistan

- Dari: وزارت مالیه افغانستان; Pashto: د افغانستان د مالیې وزارت
- Ministry flag

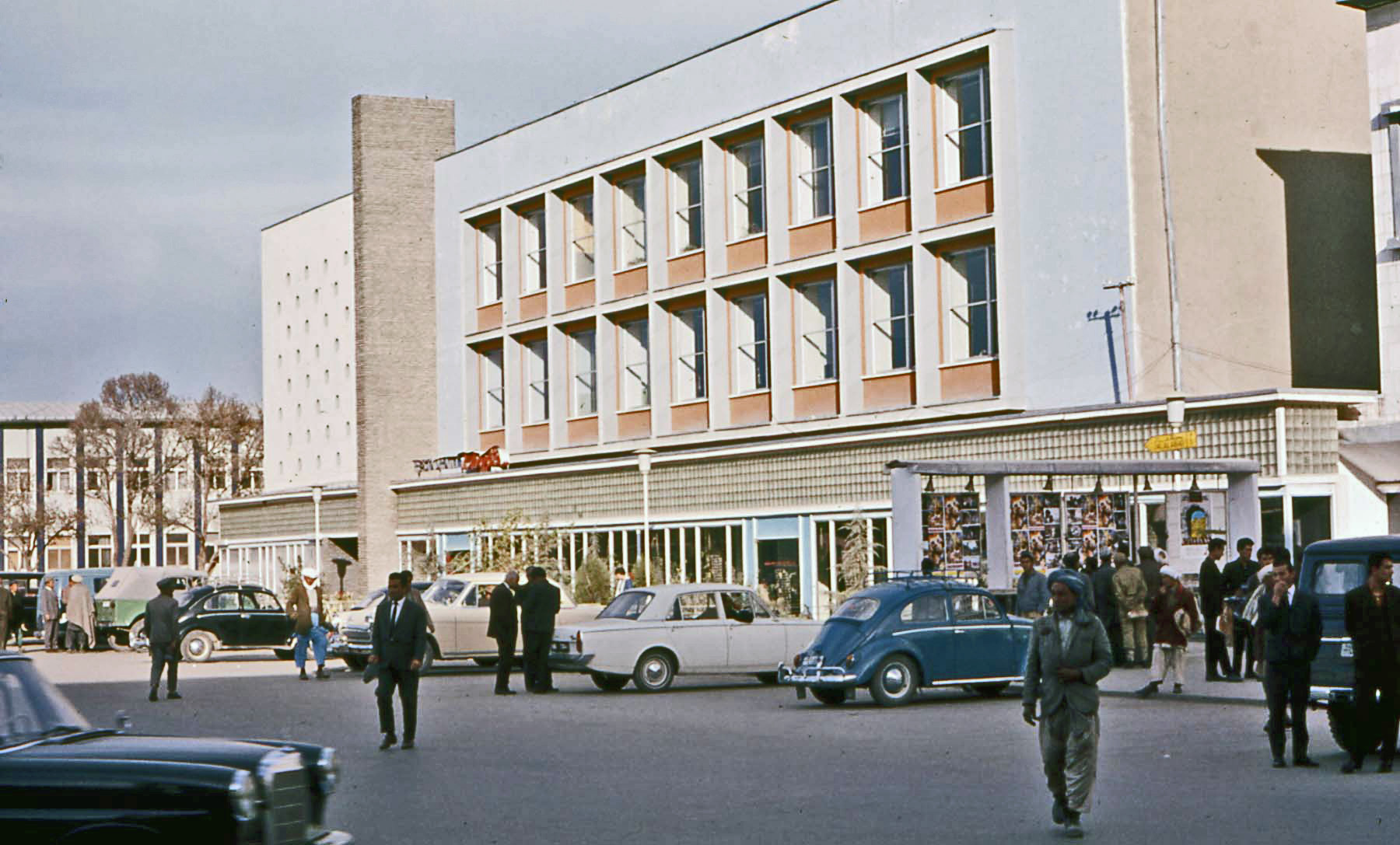
- Ministry of Finance in 1966

Agency overview
- Jurisdiction: Government of Afghanistan
- Headquarters: Kabul, Afghanistan; 34.520063°N 69.180688°E
- Minister responsible: Nasir Akhund
- Agency executive: Ahmad Wali Haqmal, spokesman
- Website: mof.gov.af/en

The Ministry of Finance of Afghanistan (Dari: وزارت مالیه افغانستان, Pashto: د افغانستان د مالیې وزارت) is responsible for the implementation and execution of the budget, collection of taxes, organization, and control of public expenses in Afghanistan; it also controls the management of the Custom Affairs. It is located next to the Pashtunistan Square in the Wazir Akbar Khan neighborhood of Kabul, Afghanistan.

The Ministry of Finance provides a quarterly report to inform the public and the executive cabinet of advancements in Afghanistan's financial sector. The current Finance Minister is Nasir Akhund.

== History ==
During the reign of Ahmad Shah Baba, when greater importance was given to financial matters, the foundation of a branch called Humayun Aala (present-day Ministry of Finance) was first laid in 1140 AD along with other affairs and structures of the state and its affairs were carried out with the permission of Sardar Abdullah Khan Popalzi who was the first finance minister. At that time he was also given the name Dewan Begi. Over time, the title of Dewan Begi was changed to Mustafi Al Malik and his name was the same as that of the current Ministry of Finance. Mustafi al-Malik used his power to coordinate and supervise everyone's financial and accounting affairs of all provinces. Under king Habibullah Khan the tax base was small and the majority of Afghans did not accept the system in place. After achieving independence and reform of administrative military organization, the new Ministry of Finance was established. “Later, in 1965 the financial systems were developed and officially introduced in Afghanistan.” According to the requirements and needs of Afghan financial system the ministry of Finance has following structure: Ministry, Deputy Administrative, Financial Deputy, Deputy Revenue and Customs, and Deputy Policy. The Ministry of Finance has 12 departments and each department has certain responsibilities to lead and manage.

== Responsibilities ==
International donors financially support the main portion of the Afghan governmental budget. As the Ministry of Finance is responsible for public finance and budget expenses throughout the country, it encourages international donors to provide direct budget aid in order to strengthen the position and credibility of the Ministry of Finance. According to the Afghanistan National Development Strategy the target sectors in 1390 (2011) were the security sector, the education sector and the governance sector. The goal of the strategy is reduce poverty, accelerate economic growth and improve security and governance. In 1391 (2012), budget AFS 18,838 million was allocated to security sector, for Education sector 5.533 million and for governance sector 2,531 million were allocated.

The total development budget for fiscal year 1390 (2011) was Afs 74 billion - which is equal to US$1.4 billion - and it increased to Afs 101.2 billion equal to US$1.9 billion in 1391 Whereas in 1391 the total development grants reached to 14.2 billion which increased by 49.5 percent throughout the year. The Ministry of Finance tries to adjust its financial systems and financial activities according to international rules and regulations. In order to accomplish these targets, the Ministry of Finance created new units, which include staff enrollment parts, policy design, and budget execution. The main goal of Ministry of Finance is control the financial affairs of the country in order to have an economically more powerful country and make sure that public wealth is improved.

== Afghanistan Customs Department ==
Flag of General Directorate of Customs of the Islamic Emirate of Afghanistan

Early flag of Afghanistan Customs Department of the Islamic Emirate of Afghanistan

Flag of Afghanistan Customs Department of the Islamic Republic of Afghanistan

Afghanistan Customs Department, also called the General Directorate of Customs is the revenue service of the Ministry of Finance. Customs Department is responsible for collecting taxes and prevention of smuggling.

== Ministers of Finance ==
=== In the Durrani Empire ===
- Sardar Abdullah Khan Popalzai, 1747-?

=== In the Kingdom of Afghanistan ===
- Muhammad Ayyub, 1929-1933
- Mirza Muhammad Yaftali, 1933-1945
- Muhammad Nauruz, 1945-1946
- Mir Muhammad Haidar Husaini, 1946-1950
- Muhammad Nauruz, 1950-1952
- Ghulam Yahya Tarzi, 1952-1954
- Abdul Malik Abdul-Rahimzay, 1954-1957
- Abdullah Malikyar, 1957-1963
- Sayyid Qasim Rishtiya, 1963-1965
- Abdullah Yaftali, November 1965 - January 1967
- Abdul Karim Hakimi, January 1967 - November 1967
- Muhammad Anwar Ziyai, November 1967 - November 1969
- Mohammad Aman, November 1969 - June 1971
- Ghulam Haidar Dawar, June 1971 - December 1972
- Muhammad Khan Jalalar, December 1972 - July 1973

=== In the Republic of Afghanistan ===
- Sayyid Abdulillah, August 1973 - 1973
- Mohammad Hasan Sharq, November 1975 - 1976 - ?
- Sayyid Abdullah, March 1977 - April 1978,

=== In the Democratic Republic of Afghanistan ===
- Saleh Mohammad Zirai, April 1978 - May 1978
- Abdul Karim Misaq, May 1978 - April 1979 - ?
- Mohammad Abdul Wakil, December 1979 - 1984
- Mohammad Kabir, July 1984 - June 1988
- Hamidullah Tarzi, June 1988 - May 1990
- Muhammad Hakim, May 1990 - 1991

=== In the Islamic State of Afghanistan ===
- Hamidullah Rahimi, 1992 - ?
- Karim Khalili, ? - 1993 - 1996
- Abdul Hadi Arghandiwal, July 1996 – September 1996

=== In the Islamic Emirate of Afghanistan ===
- Mohammad Ahmadi, ? - 1999 - ?
- Agha Jan Motasim, ? - 1999 - ?
- Muhammad Taher Anwari, ? - 2000 - ?

=== In the Islamic Republic of Afghanistan ===
- Hedayat Arsala, December 2001 - June 2002
- Ashraf Ghani, June 2002 - December 2004
- Anwar ul-Haq Ahady, December 2004 - February 2009
- Omar Zakhilwal, February 2009 – February 2015
- Eklil Ahmad Hakimi, February 2015 – March 2018
- Mohammad Qayoumi, April 2018 – March 2020
- Abdul Hadi Arghandiwal, March 2020 – January 2021
- Khalid Painda, January 2021 - August 2021

=== In the Islamic Emirate of Afghanistan ===
- Gul Agha Ishakzai, 24 August 2021 – 30 May 2023
- Mohammad Nasir Akhund, 30 May 2023 – present

== Previous Ministers ==
=== Previous Minister of Finance ===
- Hedayat Arsala (2001-2002),
- Ashraf Ghani (2002-2004),
- Dr. Anwar-ul Haq Ahadi Ahady (2004-2009),
- Dr. Hazrat Omar Zakhelwal Zakhilwal (20090207- ) confirmed for second term by Wolesi Jirga (20100103),
- Dr. Hazrat Omar Zakhilwal Acting Minister of Finance and Adviser on Economic Affairs (20140930)
- acting Minister of Finance Mohammad Mustafa Mastoor (20141212)
- Ahmad Eklil Hakimi (20150127-20180627) 20161113 survived vote of no confidence) stepped down (20180626)
- Dr. Humayoun Qayoumi (20180717, 20190714, 20200331) nominated and acting
- Abdul Hadi Arghandiwal (20200331, 20201121 sacked 20210123)
- Khalid Painda Khalid Payenda Khaled Payenda (20210123) appointed and acting (20210809)
- Alam Shah Ibrahimi, deputy Minister of Customs, acting (20210810)
- Gul Agha Ishaqzai (20210826)
- Mullah Hayatullah Badri Mullah Hedayatullah Badri acting aka Gul Agha Ishakzai (20210907)
- Haji Mullah Mohammad Nasir acting (20230529)

=== Deputy Minister ===
- Deputy Minister Abdul Salam Rahimi (2002-2004 resigned after Ashraf Ghani left the Ministry of Finance)
- Deputy Minister Finance: Dr Mohammad Mustafa Mastoor, Mustaf Mastur (20091130, 20120516),
- Khalid Payenda Khaled Payenda (20180110, 20180327)
- Zahid Hamdard Mohammad Zahid "Hamdard" (20191124, 20200806)
- Abdul Habib Zadran (20210519)
- Mullah Nasser Akhund, Mullah Mohammad Nasir Akhund, deputy minister of finance (20211122)

=== Deputy Minister Custom and Revenue ===
- Gul Maqsood Saqib (20091130),
- Said Mubin Shah, (20100731)
- Gul Maqsood Sabit appointed second time (20130317)
- Abdullah Raqibi (20190210)
- Najibullah Wardak (20170926, 201800812)
- Abdulah " Raqibi" (20200806)
- Alim Shah Ibrahim (20210519)
- Mullah Abdul Qahir Idris, former Deputy Minister of Energy at the Ministry of Water and Energy, Deputy Minister of Revenue and Customs at the Ministry of Finance (20230529)

=== Deputy Minister Administration and Finance ===
- Abdul Razique Samadi, (20091130),
- Eng. Mohammad Jamizada (20110328)
- Haji Abdul Qadeer Ahmad, former second vice president of Da Bank Afghanistan, Deputy in charge of financial and administrative affairs at the Ministry of Finance (20230529)
- Mawlawi Dost Mohammad Mukhles, Deputy Minister of Administration at the Ministry of Finance (20241010)

=== Deputy Minister for Policy at the Ministry of Finance ===
- Mrs. Naheed Sarabi Nahid Sarabi (20191124, 20200806)
- Nazir Kabiri ( 2021, 2022)
- Eng. Sultan Mohammad Zubir has been appointed as the Deputy Finance Minister in Policy (20231104)
- Haji Abdul Qadir Ahmad Deputy Minister of Finance

== See also ==
- Cabinet of Afghanistan
