= Ministry of Mines and Petroleum =

Ministry of Mines and Petroleum may refer to:

- Ministry of Mines and Petroleum (Afghanistan)
- Ministry of Mines and Petroleum (Ethiopia)
