= Shahabuddin Delawar =

Taliban leader and Diplomat

Shahabuddin Delawar شهاب الدین دلاور

Minister of Minerals and Petroleum of Afghanistan
- Acting
- In office 23 November 2021 – 7 July 2024
- Prime Minister: Mohammad Hassan Akhund (acting)
- Leader: Hibatullah Akhundzada
- Preceded by: Mohammed Isa Akhund
- Succeeded by: Gul Agha Ishakzai

Islamic Emirate of Afghanistan Ambassador to Saudi Arabia
- In office c. 1996 – c. 2001
- Prime Minister: Mohammad Rabbani (acting)
- Leader: Mohammed Omar

Personal details
- Born: 1950s
- Party: Taliban
- Education: Darul Uloom Haqqania
- Occupation: Politician, Islamic scholar, Taliban member

Maulvi Shahabuddin Delawar (Pashto: مولوي شهاب الدين دلاورد) (born; 1950s) is an Afghan senior leader of the Taliban and Islamic scholar.

== Life and career ==
Delawar was formerly the Minister of Minerals and Petroleum in the internationally unrecognized Taliban regime in the Islamic Emirate of Afghanistan from 23 November 2021 to 7 July 2024 and since then the chief of the Afghan Red Crescent Society. He was a founding member of their negotiating team based in Qatar, arrived there in January 2012. He served as ambassador to Pakistan and Saudi Arabia under the Taliban government. He also served as Consul General at the Afghan Consulate in Peshawar.

Delawar belongs to Logar province. He completed his graduation from Darul Uloom Haqqania. He has been associated with teaching at religious seminaries and, as of 2021, was running a religious seminary in Peshawar. Delawar joined the Taliban in the 1990s when they emerged in Afghanistan.
