= Muhammad Hashim Esmatullahi =

Dr. Muhammad Hashim Esmatullahi is an Afghan journalist and head of the Union of Afghan Journalists. He was Minister designate for Higher Education for the Afghan Government but was not confirmed by the Afghan Parliament.

== Personal information ==
Dr. Esmatullahi was born in 1955 in Wazirabad, Kabul. He is an ethnic Qizilbash. He received early education at the Naderia High School in 1975 and graduated from the Literature Department of Kabul University in 1979. He obtained a Master's degree in Journalism from Allameh Tabatabaei University, Tehran. He has been a lecturer at the Journalism Department of Kabul University since 2004. He also has been responsible for appointments to high government posts for the last two years as a member on the presidential consultation boards.

He was the Acting Chairman of the independent commission for Radio Television Afghanistan (RTA) in 2007.
