= Mohammad Qayoumi =

Afghani-American engineer and university administrator

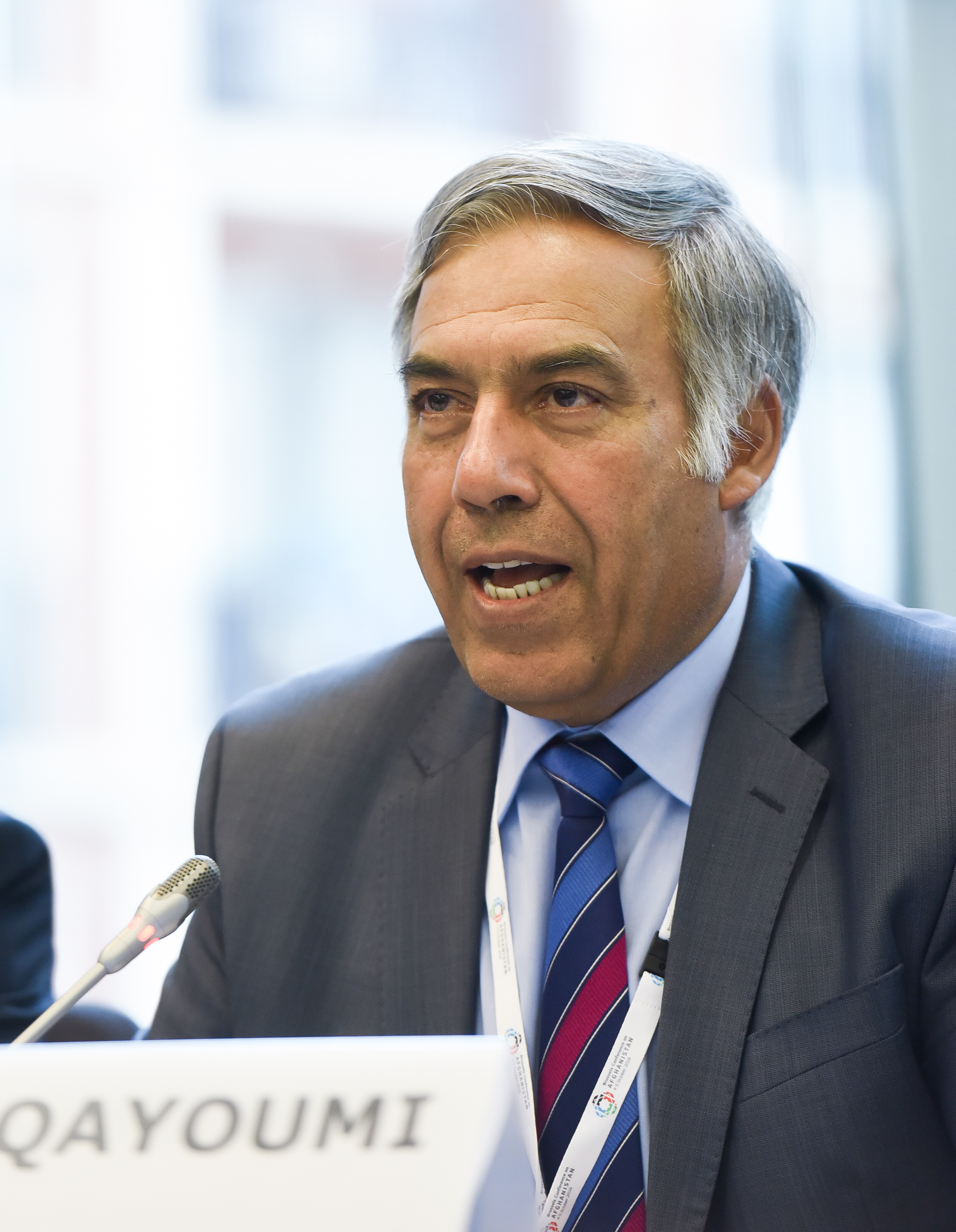
- Mohammad Qayoumi in 2016

Finance Minister
- In office July 2018 – March 2020
- Preceded by: Eklil Ahmad Hakimi
- Succeeded by: Abdul Hadi Arghandiwal

Chief Adviser on Infrastructure and Technology to the President of Afghanistan
- In office 2015 – March 2020

28th President of San José State University
- In office July 1, 2011 – August 17, 2015
- Preceded by: Don Kassing
- Succeeded by: Susan Martin

4th President of California State University, East Bay
- In office 2006–2011
- Preceded by: Norma Rees
- Succeeded by: Leroy Morishita

Personal details
- Born: Mohammad Humayon Qayoumi; December 14, 1952 (age 73) Kabul, Kingdom of Afghanistan
- Education: University of Cincinnati (Ph.D., M.B.A., M.S., M.S.); American University of Beirut (B.S.)
- Scientific career
- Fields: Engineering

Mohammad Humayon Qayoumi (Persian: محمد قیومی; born December 14, 1952) is an engineer and professor who formerly served as acting Minister of Finance and as the Chief Adviser on Infrastructure and Technology to the President of Afghanistan. He previously served as President of San José State University where he was appointed on March 23, 2011. Prior to that, he served as the fourth president of California State University, East Bay. He has worked in university administration for more than 30 years and has a background in both engineering and business. Qayoumi was born in Afghanistan and is the first Afghan-American to head a major U.S. university.

In June 2010, Qayoumi contributed a photo essay to Foreign Policy magazine about Afghanistan in the 1960s, which led to an interview on the NPR program Morning Edition (aired June 18, 2010).

== Personal and education background ==
Born near Kabul, Afghanistan, Qayoumi earned a Bachelor of Science degree in electrical engineering from American University of Beirut in 1975. He holds four degrees from the University of Cincinnati: a Master of Science in nuclear engineering (1979), a Master of Science in electrical and computer engineering (1980), an MBA (1984), and a Ph.D. in electrical engineering (1983).

He was a tenured professor of engineering management at California State University, Northridge.

== Career ==
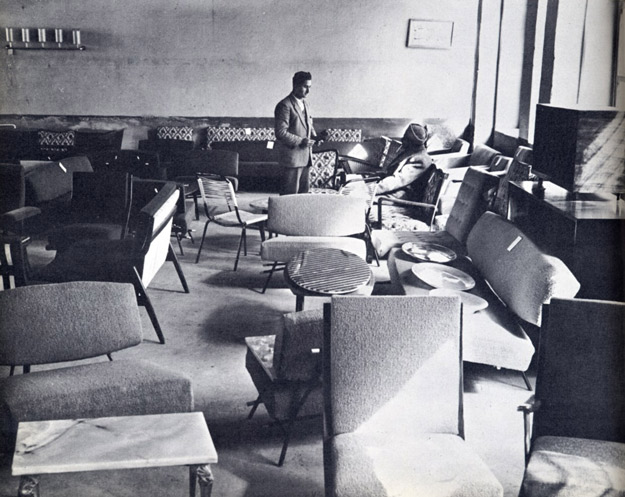
Afghanistan Furniture display room, originally published in a photobook about Afghanistan produced by the country's planning ministry; republished in Once Upon a Time in Afghanistan... Record stores, Mad Men furniture, and pencil skirts -- when Kabul had rock 'n' roll, not rockets by Mohammad Qayoumi.

=== Engineer ===
Before coming to the United States, Qayoumi worked as an engineer in Saudi Arabia and the United Arab Emirates. From 1979 to 1986, he held positions at the University of Cincinnati including staff engineer, director of technical services, and director of utilities and engineering services. In 1986, he took a position as associate vice president for Administration at San Jose State University. He served as vice chancellor for administrative services at University of Missouri–Rolla from 1995 to 2000. He then moved to California State University, Northridge, where he served as vice president for Administration and Finance and chief financial officer, as well as a tenured professor of engineering management until 2006. In 2004, Qayoumi's professional engineer registration expired.

=== President of Cal State East Bay ===
Upon taking office at CSUEB in 2006, Qayoumi identified his top priorities as enrollment growth; improved financial stability and transparency; increasing tenure track faculty; and enhancing facilities and campus physical maintenance. He has overseen development of a new physical master plan for CSUEB's Hayward campus.

Under his leadership, the university adopted new long-range academic and strategic plans in 2008 with a focus on science, technology, engineering, and math (STEM) education and on modeling and teaching sustainability. In 2009, he announced the university's first comprehensive fundraising campaign to help underwrite this change in institutional emphasis while maintaining and increasing student access, particularly among underserved populations.

=== President of San Jose State University ===
In March 2011, Qayoumi was appointed president of San Jose State University, effective July 1. Qayoumi's tenure as president was marked by controversy for low faculty morale resulting from alleged lack of effective governance, explorations in alternate online education formats, and for his response to a racially motivated hate crime against an African-American student in a dormitory.

Qayoumi created a Special Task Force on Racial Discrimination in Spring 2014 and the President's Commission for Diversity in 2014–15. He has also emphasized capital improvements to the campus.

On July 13, 2015, Qayoumi announced that he would be resigning on August 17 to take a position with the government of the Islamic Republic of Afghanistan.

=== Government of Afghanistan ===
In September 2015, Qayoumi was appointed as Chief Advisor on Technology and Infrastructure by President Ashraf Ghani, whom he had known since they were roommates in college together. He later became acting Minister for Finance, and served in that role until March 2020.

During 2020, Qayoumi became embroiled in a controversy over the funding of a construction project at the Afghan embassy in Washington DC. Implications of corruption were also leveled at the ambassador Roya Rahmani, who was subsequently removed from her post when the Islamic Republic government was overthrown in the 2021 Taliban offensive.

== Notes ==
Political offices
Preceded by Eklil Ahmad Hakimi	Minister of Finance; 2018–2020	Succeeded by Abdul Hadi Arghandiwal
