= Khalid Payenda =

Former Afghan minister of finance

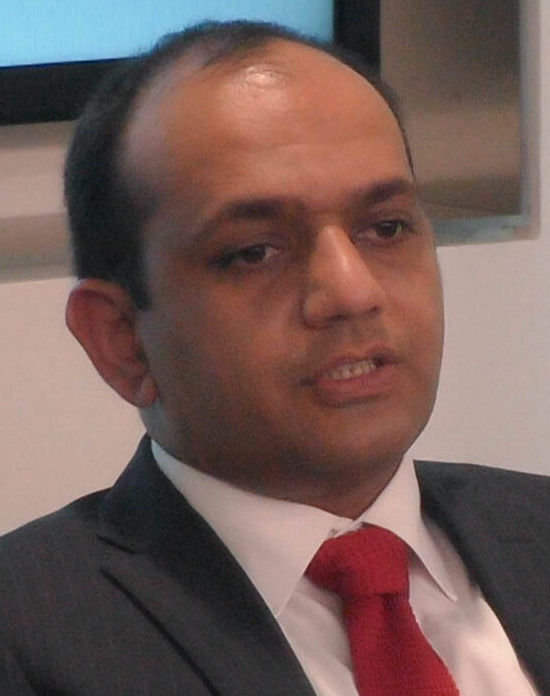

Minister of Finance of Afghanistan
- In office January 2021 – 10 August 2021
- President: Ashraf Ghani
- Preceded by: Abdul Hadi Arghandiwal
- Succeeded by: Gul Agha Ishakzai

Khalid Payenda is a former minister of finance of Afghanistan. He was appointed in January 2021 and resigned on August 10, 2021.

Payenda was a refugee as a child. In 1992, at age 11, he and his family fled to Pakistan amid the Afghan Civil War that broke out in 1992 upon the collapse of the Soviet-backed Afghan government. After the 2001 invasion of Afghanistan, Payenda returned to Afghanistan and became a co-founder of Afghanistan's first private university. He worked for the U.S. Agency for International Development and the World Bank. In 2008, he came to the United States to study at the University of Illinois as a Fulbright Scholar.

Payenda became deputy finance minister in 2016, and was aligned with a group of young officials who supported government reform and efforts to combat endemic corruption in Afghanistan. He left that post in 2019 and relocated to the U.S., but returned to Afghanistan in late 2020 and was offered the post of finance minister by then-Afghan President Ashraf Ghani. As finance minister, he confronted an illegal "customs" station outside Kandahar operated by Afghan police who were siphoning money from the government; the police threatened Payenda at gunpoint. He resigned as finance minister one week before the collapse of the Afghan government and the fall of Kabul to the Taliban, the culmination of the 2021 Taliban offensive. He resigned after being publicly and privately criticized by Ghani. After leaving Afghanistan, Payenda fled to the United States, where, as of spring 2022, he co-taught a course at Georgetown University and worked in the Washington, D.C., area as an Uber driver.

Payenda is married and has four children, and lives in Woodbridge, Virginia.

Political offices
Preceded by Abdul Hadi Arghandiwal	Minister of Finance; 2021	Succeeded by Gul Agha Ishakzai
