= Nasir Akhund =

Afghan politician

Haji Mullah Nasir Akhund
- ملا ناصر آخوند

Minister of Finance
- Incumbent
- Assumed office 23 November 2021 (Note: Acting: 23 November 2021 – 15 August 2025)
- Prime Minister: Mohammad Hassan Akhund
- Supreme Leader: Hibatullah Akhundzada
- Preceded by: Gul Agha Ishakzai

Personal details
- Party: Taliban
- Occupation: Politician, Taliban member

Haji Mullah Nasir Akhund (Pashto: حاجي ملا ناصر اخند) is an Afghan Taliban politician who is serving as Minister of Finance of the Islamic Emirate of Afghanistan since 23 November 2021.
