= Mohammed Isa Akhund =

Afghan Minerals and Petroleum Minister since 2021

Haji Mullah Mohammed Isa Thani محمدعیسیٰ ثانی

Deputy Minister of Minerals and Petroleum
- Incumbent
- Assumed office 23 November 2021 (Note: Acting: 23 November 2021 – 15 August 2025)
- Prime Minister: Mohammad Hassan Akhund
- Minister: Shahabuddin Delawar
- Supreme Leader: Hibatullah Akhundzada

Minister of Minerals and Petroleum
- In office 7 September 2021 – 22 November 2021
- Prime Minister: Mohammad Hassan Akhund (acting)
- Leader: Hibatullah Akhundzada
- Succeeded by: Shahabuddin Delawar

Minister of Mines and Industries
- In office c. 1996 – c. 2001
- Prime Minister: Mohammed Rabbani; Abdul Kabir
- Leader: Mohammed Omar

Personal details
- Party: Taliban
- Occupation: Politician, Taliban member

Mohammed Isa Thani (Pashto: محمدعیسیٰ ثانی [mʊˈhamad ˈisa ɑˈxund]) is the Deputy Minister of Minerals and Petroleum of the Islamic Emirate of Afghanistan since 23 November 2021. He has also served as Minister of Minerals and Petroleum of the Islamic Emirate of Afghanistan from 7 September 2021 to 22 November 2021 replaced by Shahabuddin Delawar. He also served as minister of mines and industries in the previous government (1996–2001).
