= Eklil Ahmad Hakimi =

Afghan diplomat

- اکلیل احمد حکیمی
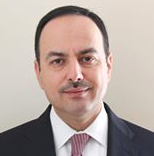
- Hakimi in 2015

Minister of Finance
- In office 1 February 2015 – 26 June 2018
- President: Ashraf Ghani
- Preceded by: Omar Zakhilwal
- Succeeded by: Mohammad Humayon Qayoumi

Personal details
- Born: 1968 (age 57–58) Kabul, Afghanistan
- Education: Polytechnical University of Kabul

Eklil Ahmad Hakimi (Pashto: اکلیل احمد حکیمی; born 1968) was Afghanistan's Minister of Finance and a former Afghan diplomat. He has served as Afghanistan's deputy foreign minister as well as its ambassador to China, Japan and the United States.

== Personal life and early career ==
Eklil Ahmad Hakimi was born in 1968 in Kabul, Afghanistan. He is an ethnic Pashtun, whose family hails from Laghman Province. After graduating from Istiqlal French High School in 1985, he obtained his master's degree in Electronic Engineering from the Kabul Polytechnic Institute in 1992. Upon the completion of his studies, Hakimi joined the Afghan Ministry of Foreign Affairs the same year.

Due to the worsening situation in Kabul, Hakimi and his family moved to the United States in 1993. During his time in the U.S., he worked in engineering, banking, management and strategic planning.

In 2002, Hakimi returned to Kabul to serve as an advisor to the Finance Ministry of Afghanistan. During this time, he played a significant role in capacity building for the Ministry. In 2003, as a founding member of the Civil Service and Administrative Reform Commission, Hakimi began working to improve the structures of the Afghan government's administrative and financial institutions.

Hakimi was appointed as Ambassador of the Islamic Republic of Afghanistan to China in 2005. At this time, he also began serving as non-resident Ambassador to Vietnam and Mongolia. In 2009, Hakimi began his next appointment as Ambassador to Japan and non-resident Ambassador to the Philippines and Singapore. In March 2010, he returned to Kabul as the Deputy Foreign Minister for Political Affairs, and in February 2011, he became Ambassador to the United States.

During his time as the Extraordinary Representative and Ambassador of the Islamic Republic of Afghanistan to the United States, Hakimi played a vital role in securing aid and support for Afghanistan. His efforts have paved the way for the implementation of important national and regional projects for the future of Afghanistan.

On 28 January 2015, Hakimi after obtaining the vote of confidence of the people's representatives in the Parliament was elected as the Minister of Finance of the Islamic Republic of Afghanistan.

== Return to Afghanistan and diplomatic career ==
=== In Afghanistan, China, and Japan ===
In 2002, as U.S.-backed interim leader Hamid Karzai began to form a new transitional administration in Afghanistan, Hakimi responded to his request for members of the Afghan diaspora to aid in rebuilding their homeland, and returned to Afghanistan, while his family remained in the United States. There he worked for the government in a variety of capacities, including in the Ministry of Finance, the Independent Administrative Reform and Civil Service Commission, and the Office of the Vice President.

In 2005, Hakimi was named Afghanistan's ambassador to China, and presented his credentials to Chinese President Hu Jintao on 28 December 2005. He renounced his U.S. citizenship to take up his new job. In this post he was also accredited to Mongolia and Vietnam. During his tenure, Afghanistan–China relations moved forward with the negotiation of a Treaty of Friendship, Cooperation and Good-neighborly Relations, which was signed on 19 June 2006 and came into effect on 13 August 2008. He called for closer cooperation with China in the areas of agriculture, infrastructure, and natural resources as well as in the fight against terrorism and illegal narcotics.

In 2009, Hakimi began his next appointment as Ambassador to Japan and non-resident Ambassador to the Philippines and Singapore. Major events in Afghanistan–Japan relations during his tenure included the closure of the Japan Maritime Self-Defense Force's Indian Ocean refuelling mission, as well as a restructuring of Japan's package of foreign aid to Afghanistan. In March 2010, he returned to Kabul as the Deputy Foreign Minister for Political Affairs, and in February 2011, he became Ambassador to the United States.

=== In the United States ===
Hakimi arrived in Washington on 14 February 2011 to take up his new post as Afghanistan's ambassador to the United States, and presented his credentials to U.S. President Barack Obama on 23 February 2011. In his new post he was also accredited to Argentina, Brazil, Colombia, and Mexico. During his time as the Extraordinary Representative and Ambassador of the Islamic Republic of Afghanistan to the United States, Hakimi played a vital role in securing aid and support for Afghanistan. His efforts have paved the way for the implementation of important national and regional projects for the future of Afghanistan. Hakimi also served as the chief negotiator for the U.S.-Afghan Bilateral Security Agreement on behalf of the Afghan Government.

== Other activities ==
- Asian Infrastructure Investment Bank (AIIB), Ex-Officio Member of the Board of Governors
- Multilateral Investment Guarantee Agency (MIGA), World Bank Group, Ex-Officio Member of the Board of Governors
- World Bank, Ex-Officio Member of the Board of Governors

Political offices
Preceded by Omar Zakhilwal	Minister of Finance; 2015–2018	Succeeded by Mohammad Qayoumi
