= Abdullah Malikyar =

Afghan politician (1909–2001)

Governor of Herat
- In office 1941–1948
- Monarch: Zahir Shah
- Preceded by: Muhammad Qasim
- Succeeded by: Gul Ahmad Malikyar

Minister of Communications
- In office 1948–1950
- Monarch: Zahir Shah
- Preceded by: Ghulam Yahya Tarzi
- Succeeded by: Ghulam Muhammad Shirzad

Minister of Commerce
- In office 1956–1957
- Monarch: Zahir Shah
- Preceded by: Abdul Malik Abdul Rahim-Zai
- Succeeded by: Ghulam Muhammad Sherzad

Minister of Finance
- In office 1957–1963
- Monarch: Zahir Shah
- Preceded by: Abdul Malik Abdul Rahim-zai
- Succeeded by: Sayyid Qasim Rishtiya

Afghan Ambassador to Britain
- In office 1962–1964
- Monarch: Zahir Shah
- Preceded by: Muhammad Kabir Ludin
- Succeeded by: Dr. Abdul Majid

Afghan Ambassador to the United States of America
- In office 1967–1978
- Preceded by: Abdul Majid
- Succeeded by: Abdul Waheed Karim

Personal details
- Born: 1909 Kabul, Afghanistan
- Died: 4 August 2001 (aged 91-92) Virginia, United States of America
- Spouse: 2

Abdullah Malikyar was an Afghan politician who held several posts in the Government from 1941 until 1978. He was also closely related to the Barakzai dynasty by marriage.

== Early life ==
Abdullah Malikyar was born in Kabul in 1909. His father was Brigadier Abdul Ahmad Malikyar, a native of Ghazni. He had an older brother, 7 years senior to him, named General Abdul Ahad who fought against Habibullāh Kalakāni and his forces. Malikyar was educated at Istiqlal High School, (a French high school founded in 1923) He was also educated in Tehran.

== Career and Politics ==
In 1934, he began his career as the director of the third department in the Prime Ministry under the rule of the newly crowned King, Mohammad Zahir Shah.

== Personal life ==
Malikyar married Kharia. However, she died in 1940. He then married Anisa Seraj. Seraj was the daughter of Inayatullah Khan who ruled Afghanistan in January 1929. He had 7 children, two daughters from his first marriage, 3 sons and 2 daughters from his second marriage. His daughter, Gulalai married the son of Mohammad Daoud Khan.

== Death ==
Malikyar died in Virginia, on 4 August 2001 as a result of a heart condition. After his death, a dispute between his burial took place. The Herati people requested that his body be flown there and buried, whereas the residents of Ghazni requested for his body to be buried in his hometown. His wife, however, chose to bury him in Virginia.
