= Gul Agha Ishakzai =

Mines and Petroleum Minister of Afghanistan since 2024

Gul Agha Ishakzai گل آغا اسحاقزی

Minister of Mines and Petroleum
- Incumbent
- Assumed office 6 July 2024 (Note: Acting: 6 July 2024 – 15 August 2025)
- Preceded by: Shahabuddin Delawar (acting)

Governor of Da Afghanistan Bank
- Acting
- In office March 2023 – 6 July 2024
- Preceded by: Shakir Jalali (acting)
- Succeeded by: Noor Ahmad Agha (acting)

Minister of Finance
- Acting
- In office 24 August 2021 – 30 May 2023
- Preceded by: Khalid Payenda
- Succeeded by: Nasir Akhund

Principal Finance Officer to the Leader of the Islamic Emirate of Afghanistan
- In office c. 1995 – c. 2001
- Leader: Mohammed Omar

Personal details
- Born: 1972 (age 53–54) Band-e-Temur, Maiwand District, Kandahar Province
- Party: Taliban (Islamic Emirate of Afghanistan)
- Occupation: Politician, Taliban member

Gul Agha Ishakzai (born c. 1972), also known as Mullah Hidayatullah Badri (Pashto: ملا هدایت الله بدري [hɪdajatʊˈlɑ baˈdri]), is a politician in Afghanistan. Since July 2024, he is serving as the acting Minister of Mines and Petroleum. Prior to that he served as the country's Finance Minister and the acting governor of Da Afghanistan Bank from March 2023 to July 2024.

== Biographical information ==
Gul Agha was born in Band-e-Temur, Maiwand District, Kandahar Province. He belongs to the Ishaqzai tribe, and was a childhood friend of Taliban founder Mullah Mohammed Omar. He has also been known as Mullah Gul Agha, Mullah Gul Agha Akhund, Hidayatullah, Haji Hidayatullah, and Hayadatullah.

== Role in the Taliban ==
During the insurgency period, Agha led the Taliban's financial commission. His role within the Taliban organization was to collect taxes (zakat) from Baluchistan Province, Pakistan. He has organised funding for suicide attacks in Kandahar, Afghanistan, and for Taliban fighters and their families. He also has links to the related Haqqani network. A number of countries and international organisations; including the United States, the United Nations, and the European Union, have implemented sanctions against him and his associates under counter-terrorism financing measures.

He was a long-time associate of Mohammed Omar; he served as Omar's principal finance officer and one of his closest advisors, living in the presidential palace with him during the first Taliban regime.

He was made head of Talibans' Financial Commission in mid-2013. According to a UN Security Council report in January 2015, Agha, together with other members of the Quetta Shura, showed interest in restarting peace negotiations with the Afghan Government.

On 24 August 2021, he was appointed acting finance minister by the new Islamic Emirate of Afghanistan.

He was appointed acting Minister of Mines and Petroleum on 6 July 2024, with Noor Ahmad Agha taking his place as acting Governor of Da Afghanistan Bank.

Agha was aboard a helicopter of the Afghan Air Force that crashed in Ghor Province on 10 September 2025. No one on board the helicopter died or was injured.

== See also ==
- Cabinet of Afghanistan

== Notes ==
Political offices
Preceded by Khalid Payenda	Minister of Finance; 2021–2023	Succeeded by Nasir Akhund
