= Abdul Hadi Arghandiwal =

Afghan politician (born 1952)

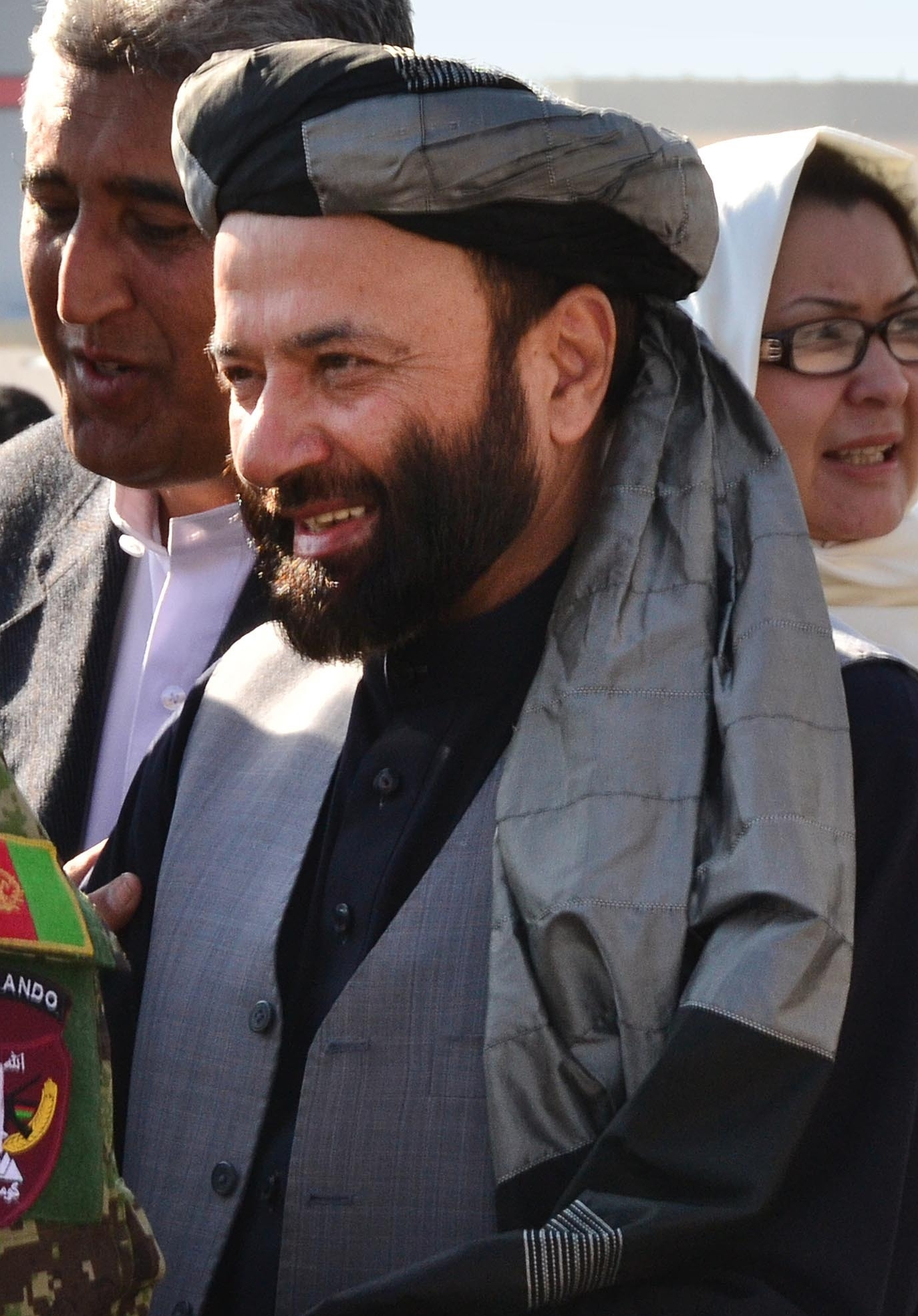
- Arghandiwal in Uruzgan in October 2012

Finance Minister
- In office March 2020 – January 2021
- President: Ashraf Ghani
- Preceded by: Mohammad Qayoumi
- Succeeded by: Khalid Painda

Chairman of Hezb-i Islami Afghanistan
- Incumbent
- Assumed office 2008

Finance Minister
- In office 3 July 1996 – 27 September 1996
- President: Burhanuddin Rabbani
- Preceded by: Karim Khalili

Economy Minister
- In office 16 January 2010 – 9 December 2014
- President: Hamid Karzai
- Preceded by: Anwar ul-Haq Ahady

Personal details
- Born: 1952 (age 73–74) Arghandi, Kingdom of Afghanistan
- Party: Hezb-i Islami Afghanistan

Abdul Hadi Arghandiwal (born 1952) is an Afghan politician and the Head of Hezb-i Islami Afghanistan. He was once allied with Islamist warlord Gulbuddin Hekmatyar, but in 2008 he was elected chairman of a moderate breakaway faction of Hekmatyar's party.

== Early life ==
Abdul Hadi Arghandiwal was born in 1952 in Arghandi, which is on the outskirts of Kabul, which was then part of the Kabul Province in the Kingdom of Afghanistan. He earned a BA in economics from Kabul University in 1976, before working at the planning ministry in 1977. After the Saur Revolution, where the PDPA took power, Arghandiwal joined the mujahideen. He was then appointed representative of the Hezb-i Islami to the United States. After eventually returning to Afghanistan, he became Hezb-i Islami's International Relations Committee Coordinator, and then he was in charge of financial affairs. He fled from Afghanistan after the outbreak of civil war to Pakistan.

== Political career ==
He has served as Minister of Finance in 1996 when Burhanuddin Rabbani was in power. Arghandiwaal has also served as advisor to President Hamid Karzai over tribal affairs. Although initially an ally of Gulbuddin Hekmatyar, the warlord who has been in charge of Hezb-i Islami, he broke away in 2008 when he became chairman of a moderate breakaway faction of Hezb-i Islami. On January 16, 2010, he was appointed as Minister of Economy by gaining a vote of confidence from the Afghan Parliament. In 2018, he was dismissed from the party by Hekmatyar for collaborating with other parties and acting against the group's goals. He responded by rejecting the statements, stating his faction was registered with the government and could not be dismissed since it was legal. The Ministry of Justice responded in affirmation of this.

He was again Minister of Finance from March 2020 to January 2021. During his time in office, he opposed a proposed dismissal of the ministry's human resources staff, which had been approved by the president. He also initiated a major reshuffle of the ministry, stating they he would remove positions that were due to personal connections, and that through systematic reforms the ministry would be more transparent. According to the decree on his dismissal in 2021, he was dismissed due to weak management, lack of cooperation, and delay in the collection of revenues, among other things.

Political offices
Preceded by Mohammad Qayoumi	Minister of Finance; 2020-2021	Succeeded by Khalid Painda
