= Omar Zakhilwal =

Afghan politician (born 1968)

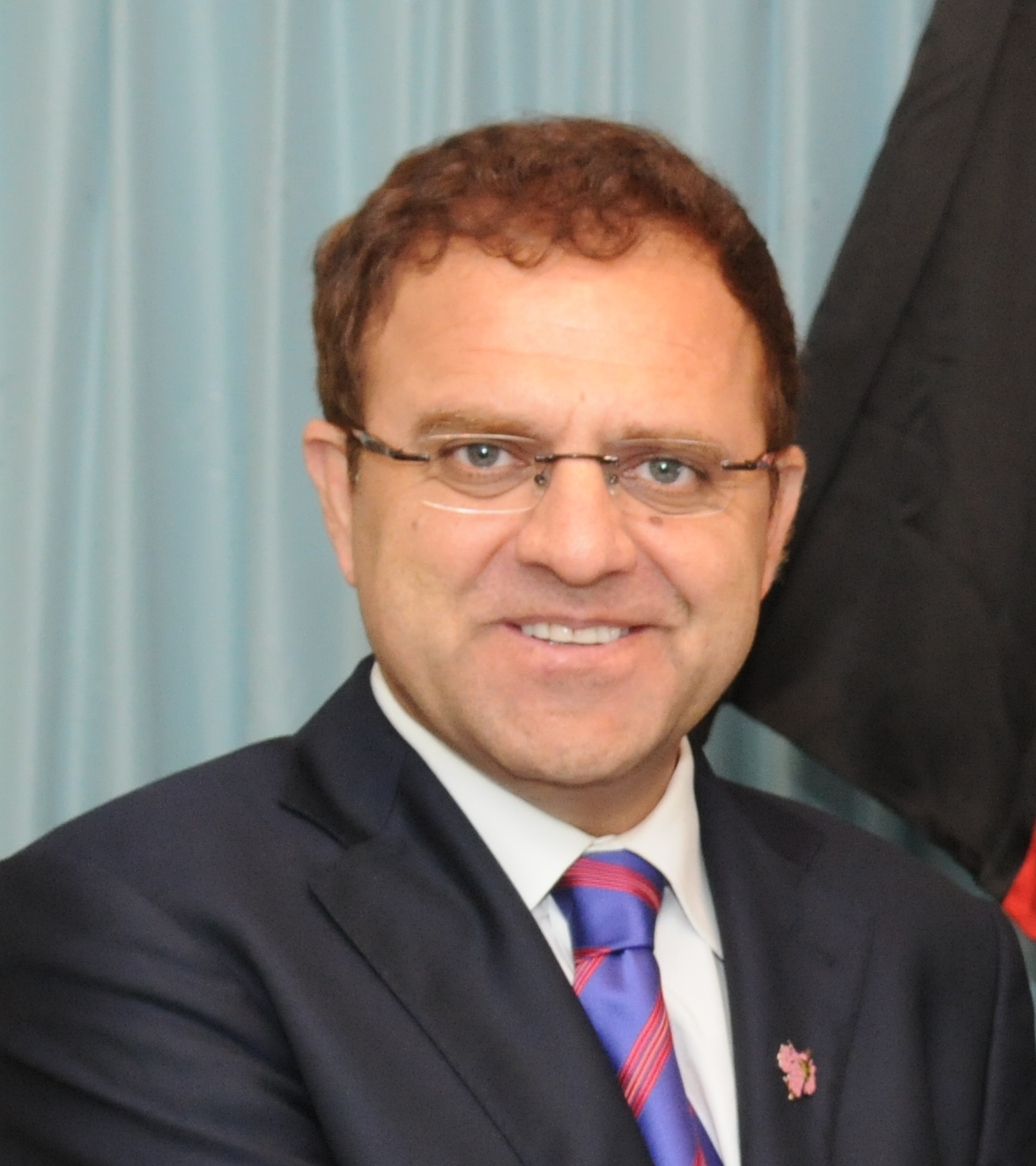

Minister of Finance
- In office 3 March 2009 – 1 February 2015
- President: Hamid Karzai; Ashraf Ghani
- Preceded by: Anwar ul-Haq Ahady
- Succeeded by: Eklil Ahmad Hakimi

Afghan Ambassador to Pakistan
- In office 9 February 2016 – November 2018
- Preceded by: Janan Mosazai
- Succeeded by: Atif Mashal

Personal details
- Born: 1968 (age 57–58) Nangarhar Province, Kingdom of Afghanistan
- Education: University of Winnipeg; Queen's University; Carleton University

Dr. Hazrat Omar Zakhilwal (Pashto: ډاکتر عمر زاخيلوال ; born 1968) is an Afghan politician who served as the President's Special Representative and Afghanistan's Ambassador to Pakistan from 2016 until 2018. He also served as Minister of Finance from 2009 to 2015. Since early 2019, Zakhilwal has been a key player in the IntraAfghan Dialogue for peace.

== Early life ==
Zakhilwal was born in 1968 in the Nangarhar Province of Afghanistan. He is believed to be an ethnic Pashtun. In 1984, at the age of 17, Zakhilwal along with his family fled his country among the Afghan refugees and settled in Peshawar, Pakistan. In 1991, he along with the family immigrated to Canada.

== Education and academics ==
Zakhilwal obtained his bachelor's degree in economics at the University of Winnipeg in Manitoba, Canada in 1994. He then moved to Kingston, Ontario, where he earned a master's degree in economics at Queen's University in 1995. Soon after, he was hired by Statistics Canada in Ottawa, where he completed a doctorate in economics at Carleton University. He graduated in 2001.

Zakhilwal published numerous articles and research papers on political, economic and social issues related to Afghanistan for newspapers, magazines and journals such as the New York Times, Washington Post, Wall Street Journal, Ottawa Citizen, Wahdat, Forum of Federation Quarterly, Human Rights Tribune, Al-Ehram, Afghan Post, Heela, Dawat, Mujahid Wolus, Afghan Mosaic, and Afghan Mirror. His work is in English, Pashto and Dari, and some of his articles are available on the internet.

== Politics ==
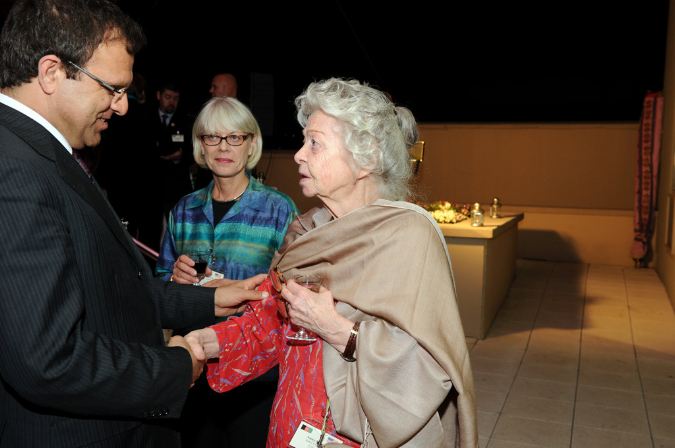
Finance Minister Zakhilwal greeting Nancy Dupree at a party at the U.S. Embassy in Kabul.

Over the course of his stay in Afghanistan, Zakhilwal has been part of the 2002 and 2003 loya jirgas. He served as an author of Afghanistan's First National Human Development Report, which was released by the United Nations Development Programme (UNDP) in February 2007 and won the UN special award for best analysis in June 2007.

He also worked as an Afghan counterpart to the North-South Institute-led "What Kind of Peace is Possible?" research project, examining the role of community-led development in sustainable peace-building, as well as working on a strategy for Counter-Narcotics Alternative Livelihood in Afghanistan. He has done consulting work for the World Bank, UNDP, CIDA, and other organisation.

Zakhilwal served as the President of the Afghanistan Investment Support Agency (AISA), a member of the Supreme Council of Da Afghanistan Bank, Acting Minister of Transport and Civil Aviation, and the Chief Advisor to the Minister of Rural Development of Afghanistan. He became the Chief Economic Advisor to President Hamid Karzai in July 2008, and in March 2009 he was chosen as the new Minister of Finance.

He served as Afghan Ambassador to Pakistan until November 2018. After the 2021 Taliban takeover, he remained in Kabul, giving limited advisory activities to the new Taliban government.

== Awards ==
Zakhilwal was honoured twice with highest government award, the Wazir Akbar Khan medal for recognition of his services from President Hamid Karzai and President Ashraf Ghani.

== Work history ==
Zakhilwal's Posts
Office of the President of Afghanistan	Chief Economic Advisor
Ministry of Finance	Finance Minister
Afghanistan Cricket Board (ACB)	Chairman
Afghanistan Investment Support Agency (AISA)	President
Transport and Civil Aviation	Acting Minister
Da Afghanistan Bank	Member of the Supreme Council
Minister of Rural Development of Afghanistan	The Chief Advisor
Government of Canada	Senior Research Economist
Carleton University in Ottawa	Professor of Economics
Board of Directors of Partnership Afghanistan Canada	President
Embassy of Afghanistan in Pakistan	Ambassador

Political offices
Preceded by Anwar ul-Haq Ahady	Minister of Finance; 2009–2015	Succeeded by Eklil Ahmad Hakimi
