= Wazirabad, Kabul =

Wazirabad وزیرآباد
- Neighborhood of Kabul
- Country: Afghanistan
- Province: Kabul

Wazirabad (Dari: وزیر آباد) is a district of Kabul, Afghanistan, which like Afshar district is populated primarily by Shia-Qizilbash.

== See also ==
- Kabul City
