= Ministry of Mines and Petroleum (Afghanistan) =

Government ministry of Afghanistan

- Ministry flag

Agency overview
- Jurisdiction: Afghanistan
- Minister responsible: Gul Agha Ishakzai, Minister of Mines and Petroleum
- Website: momp.gov.af

The Ministry of Mines and Petroleum is responsible for the management of natural resources in Afghanistan. The Ministry is responsible for developing the national economy and encouraging private sector investment in minerals and hydrocarbon extraction to maximize income and boost national income. As of 2024, the Minister of Mines and Petroleum is Gul Agha Ishakzai

== Projects ==
One of the notable projects under the Ministry of Mines and Petroleum is Mes Aynak mine, which is a major copper mine within Afghanistan.

== Ministers ==
- Shahabuddin Delawar, acting, 2021–2024
- Gul Agha Ishakzai, acting, 2024–present

Former Minister of Mines of Mines and Petroleum (MoMP) (and Industries)

- Muhammad Alam Razim Interim Government, Northern Alliance.
- Mir Moh. Sediq (2004-2005)
- Eng. Ibrahim Adil (200603).
- Wahidullah Shahrani stepped down because of Presidential Election 2014 (20090103-20131000),
- Mohammad Akbar Barakzai (20131028-20140930)
- Mohammad Akbar Barakzai acting Minister (20141001)
- acting Minister of Mines and Petroleum Mir Ahmad Jawid Sadat (20141209)
- Daud Shah Saba (20150127-20160328 resigned)
- Acting minister of Mines and Petroleum Mrs. Ghazal Habib Ghazal Habibyar Safi Ghezal Habib Yar Safi (20160416, 20160505, 20160824)
- Nomininated Mrs. Nargis Nehan ( 20170327, 20171204 rejected and acting 20180103) resigned (20191025)
- Enayatullah Momand (20191026, 20200103, 20200402)
- Harun Chakhansuri (20200611) nominated and acting. confirmed (20201130)
- Mullah Mohammad Essa Akundzada, Mullah Muhammad Essa Akhund (20210907) acting
- Maulvi Shahabuddin Delawar (20211122) acting
- Gul Agha Ishaqzai (2024)

Deputy Ministers of Mines:

- Eng. Muhammad Akram Ghayasi Ghiasi (20100104)
- Eng. Abdul Qudoos Hamidi (20100100, 20150514)
- Mrs. Ghezal Habib Yar Safi Ghazal Habibyar-Safi (2016)

Deputy Minister for Financial and Administrative Affairs:

- Abdul Jamil Hares Eng Abdul Jamil Haris (20140811)

Deputy Minister for Mine Affairs:

- Eng. Naseer Ahmand Durani (20140930)
- Ibrahim Azhar, Deputy Minister of the MoMP (20150524)
- Haji Mullah Mohammad Esa Akhund (20211122)

Deputy Minister for Policy and Programs:

- Mir Ahmed Javid Sadat, Ahmad Jawed Sadat (20160824, 20170404)
- Mohammad Ateeq Zaki (20201215,20210815)
- Sheikh Zia ur-Rahman Aruobi (20220611)

Technical Deputy Minister Mines and Petroleum

- Enayatullah Momand (2018)
- Engineer Waheedullah Halimi (20220611)
