= Amina Afzali =

Afghan politician (born 1957)

H.E. Amena Safi Afzali
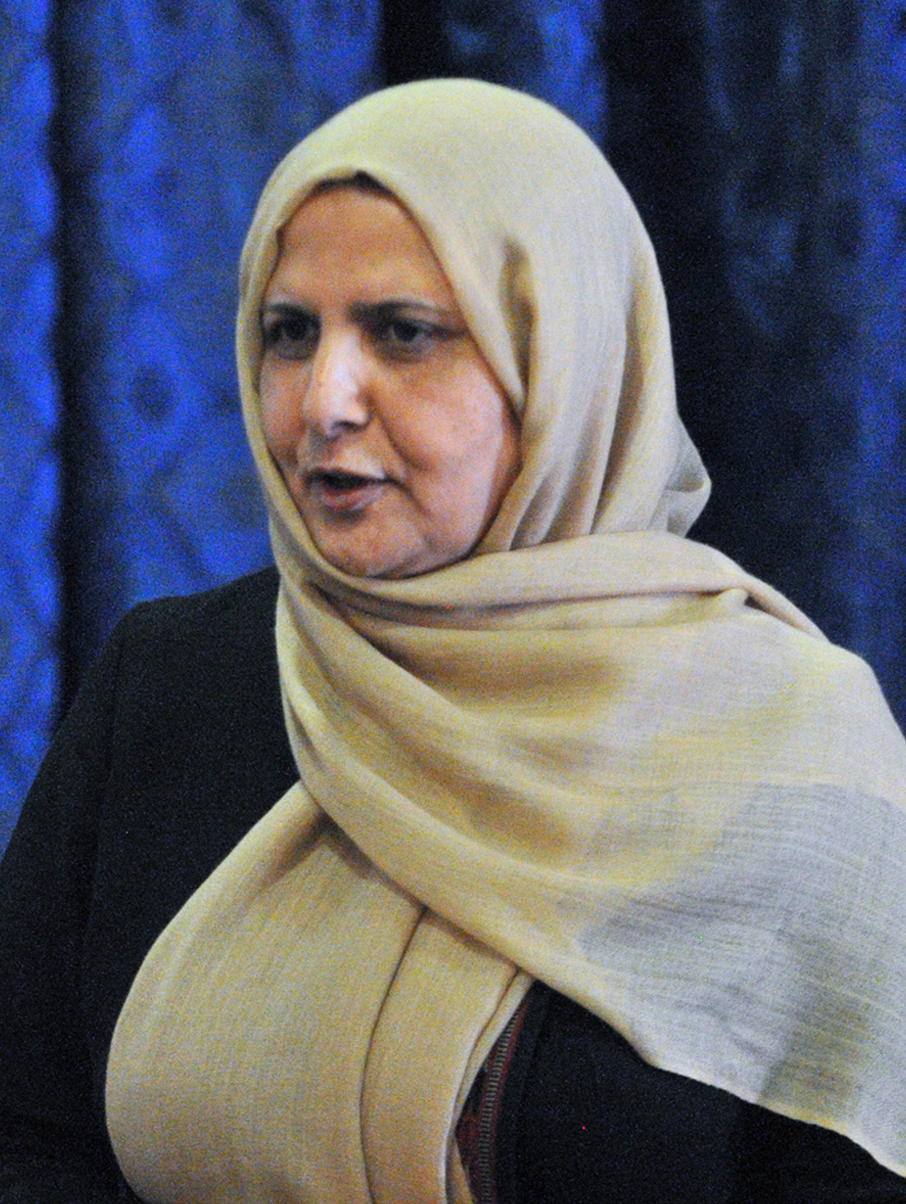
- Afzali in 2012

Work, Social Affairs, Martyred and Disabled Minister of Afghanistan
- President: Hamid Karzai

Personal details
- Born: 1957 (age 67–68); Herat, Kingdom of Afghanistan
- Education: faculty of science of Kabul University

Amena Safi Afzali (born 1957) is a politician in Afghanistan, who became Minister of Work, Social Affairs, Martyred, and Disabled in January 2010 after receiving the confidence vote of the Afghan National Assembly. She had previously served as commissioner with the Independent Human Rights Commission until 2004. and as the Minister of the Ministry of Youth Affairs until it integrated with the Ministry of Information and Culture.

== Life ==
Amena Safi Afzali was born in 1957 in Herat city, Afghanistan. She completed her higher education in faculty of science of Kabul University in 1978. She was the founder of Educational and Training Centers for women, and the first free school in Kabul in 1994. Publications such as 'Rahrawan Samia', 'Al-Momenat','Paiwand', and 'Mother' were established and released under her surveillance. She also served as commissioner with the Independent Human Rights Commission until 2004. She is a member of the Directorate of Cultural Foundation of Jamee.

== See also ==
- Cabinet of Ministers
- Politics of Afghanistan
- 1000 PeaceWomen
