= Anwar ul-Haq Ahady =

Afghan politician (born 1950)

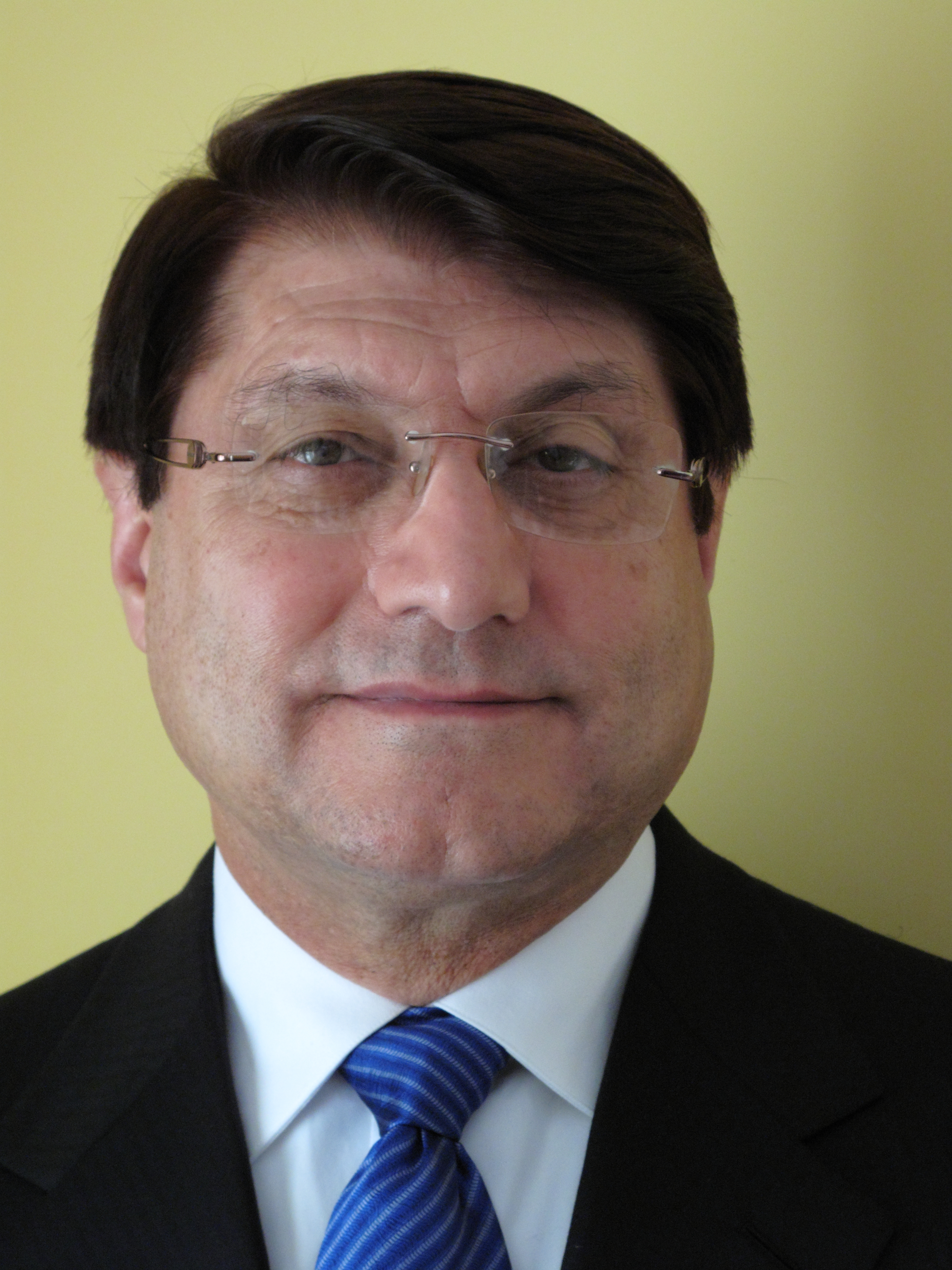
- Ahady in 2009

Minister of Finance
- In office December 2004 – February 2009
- President: Hamid Karzai
- Preceded by: Ashraf Ghani Ahmadzai
- Succeeded by: Omar Zakhilwal

Minister of Commerce and Industry
- In office 28 June 2010 – November 2013
- Preceded by: Ghulam Mohammad Eylaghi
- Succeeded by: Mohammad Shakir Kargar

Personal details
- Born: August 12, 1951 (age 75) Jigdalai, Sarobi District, Kabul Province, Kingdom of Afghanistan
- Party: Afghan Social Democratic Party (Afghan Mellat)
- Education: Kabul University Degree in Law American University in Beirut B.A. & M.A. in Political Science Northwestern University PhD in Political Science & MBA
- Occupation: Central banker
- Profession: Politician, writer

Anwar ul-Haq Ahady (August 12, 1951) is an Afghan politician and former Minister of Commerce and Industry. He had served as the nation's Finance Minister from December 2004 to February 5, 2009. From 2002 to 2004, he was the head of Da Afghanistan Bank, the central bank of Afghanistan. He is also an academic and writer.

== Early years ==
Ahady was born on 12 August 1951 in Sarobi, Kabul province, Afghanistan. He is the son of Abdul Haqhas, a Pashtun and native of the Sarobi district in Kabul province. Ahady holds a Master of Business Administration (MBA) and a Ph.D. in political science from the post-graduate faculty of Northwestern University, in Evanston, Illinois, north of Chicago. He earned a bachelor's degree as well as a master's degree in economics and political science from the American University of Beirut in Lebanon.

== Career ==
Ahady served as an assistant professor of political science at Carleton College, in Northfield, Minnesota, in the United States, and as the banking director of Continental Elona of Chicago from 1985 to 1987. He was a professor of political science at Providence College, a Catholic university in Providence, Rhode Island, from 1987 to 2002.

After the removal of the Taliban government and the formation of the Karzai administration in late 2001, Ahady was chosen as the head of Afghanistan's central bank, Da Afghanistan Bank. He has many writings in academic journals, books, and popular dailies of the United States.

He served as Afghan Finance Minister from 2004 to 2009, Minister of Commerce from 2010 to 2013, and Minister of Agriculture from 2020 to August 2021.

Following the fall of Kabul, Ahady fled abroad. He currently sits on the board of the Fund for the Afghan People, a Switzerland-based non-profit organization that administers funds of Da Afghanistan Bank frozen after the Taliban takeover of Afghanistan.

== Political affiliation ==
Ahady was the elected leader of the Afghan Millat Party until his ousting in 2016.

== Works ==
- Anwar-ul-Haq Ahady (1991). "Afghanistan: State Breakdown." In Revolutions of the Late Twentieth Century, edited by Farrokh Moshiri, Jack Goldstone and Ted R. Gurr, 162–193. Boulder: Westview Press, ISBN 9780813312996.
- Anwar-ul-Haq Ahady "Conflict in Post-Soviet-Occupation Afghanistan". Journal of Contemporary Asia 21(4) (1991): 513–528.
- Anwar-ul-Haq Ahady "The Decline of Islamic Fundamentalism". Journal of African and Asian Studies 27(3-4) (1992): 229–243.
- Anwar-ul-Haq Ahady "The Decline of the Pashtuns in Afghanistan." Asian Survey 35(7) (1995): 621–634.

Political offices
Preceded by Ashraf Ghani	Minister of Finance; 2004–2009	Succeeded by Omar Zakhilwal
Preceded by Ghulam Mohammad Eylaghi	Minister of Commerce and Industry; 2010–2013	Succeeded by Mohammad Shakir Kargar
