= Ghulam Yahya Tarzi =

Afghan diplomat

Ghulam Yahya Tarzi (born 1898, died 1975) was a public servant and diplomat in Afghanistan from 1920 to 1964.

Internationally, Ghulam Yahya Khan Tarzi began his career in public service in the field of international affairs, as Deputy Director of the Visa and Passport Section of the Afgan Ministry of Foreign Affairs. He joined the Afghan Foreign Service in 1920. He was the Director General of Political Affairs from 1926 to 1927 in the Afghan Foreign Ministry. Tarzi would return to Kabul in 1930 and in 1934 would take up the position of Director of the Public Health Department. This led to his appointment as Minister of Public Health in 1935, a critical position in the impoverished country of Afghanistan. His work in the ministry would produce many new hospitals around the country, as well as a large rise in vaccinations to all citizens.

In 1952 he would take another large step onto the international diplomatic stage as Ambassador to Sweden. Shortly thereafter, Ambassador Tarzi would take up a critical role as the Afghan Ambassador to the Soviet Union from 1952 to 1957. His foreign missions would also take him to France and Hungary before the end of his long diplomatic tenure would finish.

He died on 6 March 1975. All 7 of his children survived him.

== Ghulam Yahya Khan Tarzi diplomatic record ==
| Date | Representing | Position | Mission |
|---|---|---|---|
| 1960–1964 | Afghanistan | Permanent Representative | Hungary |
| 1957–1960 | Afghanistan | Permanent Representative | France |
| 1952–1957 | Afghanistan | Permanent Representative | Soviet Union |
| 1948–1951 | Afghanistan | Temporary Representative | Iraq |
| 1929–1930 | Afghanistan | Special Envoy | Syria, Lebanon and Jordan |
