= Battle of Yesil Kol Nor =

18th-century war painting

- Part of the Revolt of the Altishahr Khojas
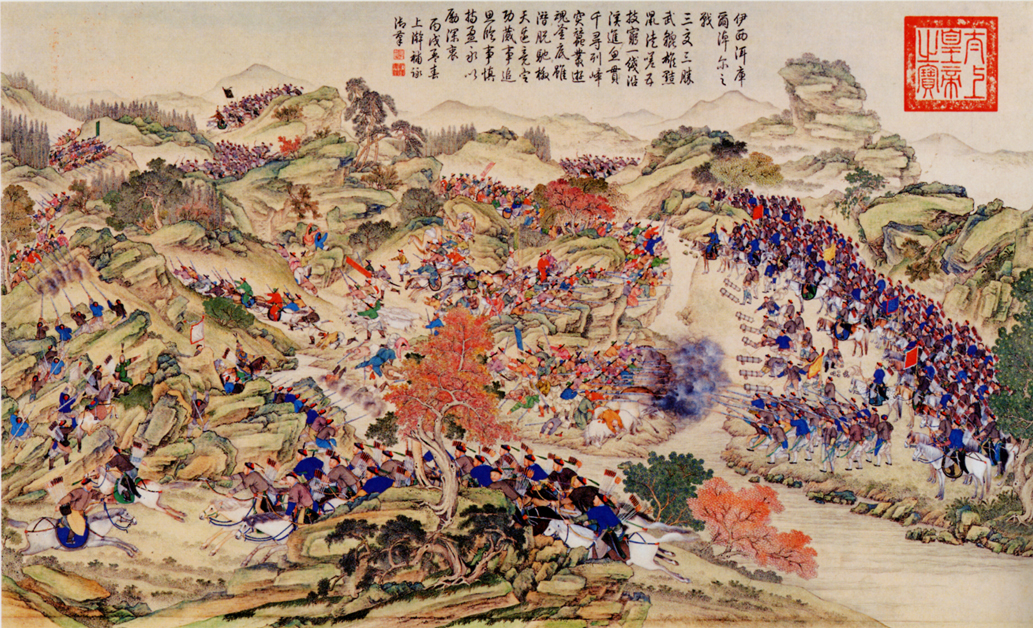
Date	September 1759
Location	Yechil Koul Nor (Lake), Xinjiang
Result	Qing victory

Belligerents
Qing dynasty	Altishahr Khojas

Commanders and leaders
Fude; Arigun	Khwāja-i Jahān; Burhān al-Dīn

Strength
10,000 infantry 10 zamburaks 20 cannons	10,000 infantry

Casualties and losses
400	2,000 surrendered many dead and wounded

The Battle of Yesil Kol Nor (Chinese: 伊西洱庫爾淖爾之戰) is an 18th-century war painting created by Chinese court painters and European Jesuits. It was commissioned by the Qianlong Emperor of the Chinese Qing dynasty as part of an order of 16 large battle paintings (8 metres wide by 4 metres tall) to commemorate battles that took place in Qurman, in modern-day Tajikistan in February 1759. The battles resulted in the Qing Empire successfully regaining control of Xinjiang from the Turks who had occupied the province following the ousting of the Dzungar people from the region by Qing forces.

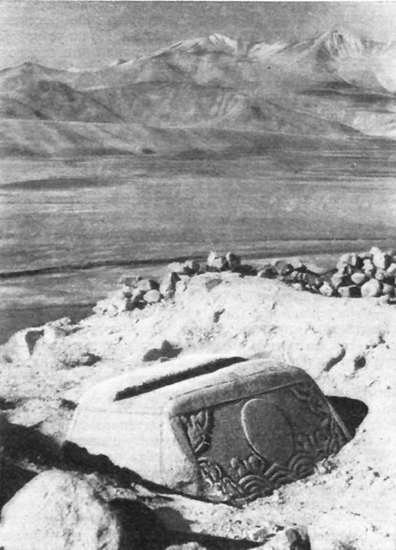
The plinth of Chinese Monument set by the Lake Yashilkul, photoed by the Russian in the 19th century.
