= Timeline of Xinjiang under Qing rule =

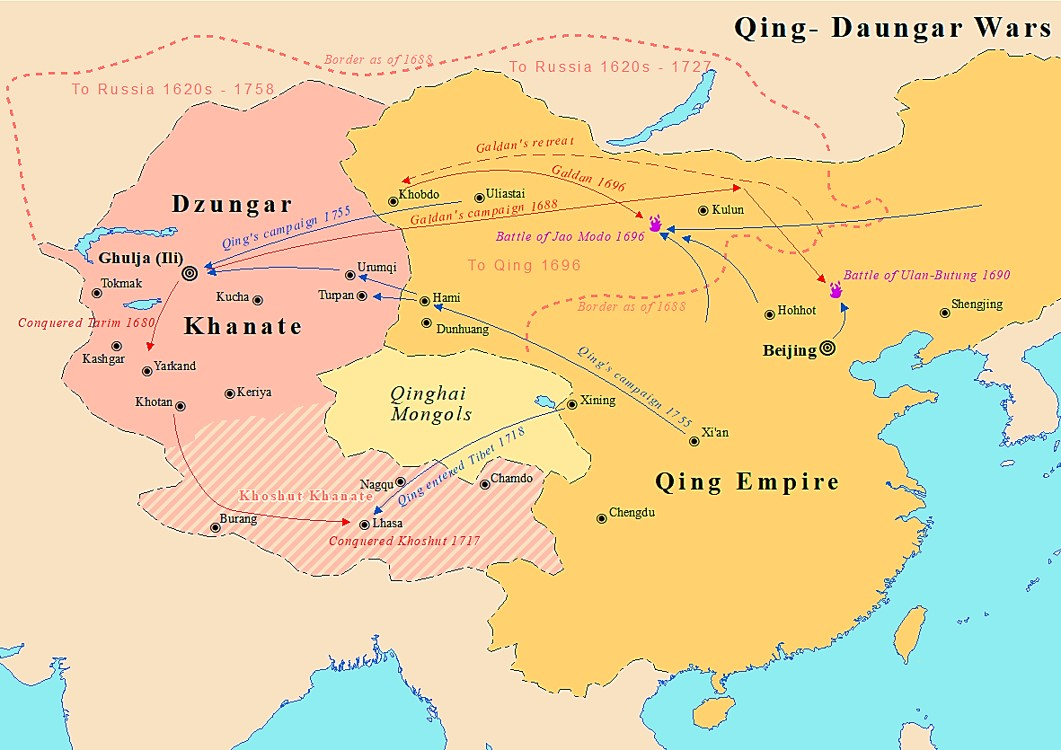
Map showing wars between Qing dynasty and Dzungar Khanate

This is a timeline of the Xinjiang under the rule of the Qing dynasty.

== 17th century ==
=== 1690s ===
| Year | Date | Event |
|---|---|---|
| 1697 | | ʿAbdu l-Lāh Tarkhān Beg rebels against the Dzungar Khanate in Hami |
| 1698 | | Qing dynasty occupies Hami |

== 18th century ==
=== 1720s ===
| Year | Date | Event |
|---|---|---|
| 1720 | | Amin Khoja leads a rebellion in Turpan against the Dzungar Khanate and defects to the Qing dynasty |

=== 1730s ===
| Year | Date | Event |
|---|---|---|
| 1732 | | Dzungar Khanate attacks Amin Khoja, who takes his people to settle in Guazhou |
| 1737 | | Abuse by the Dzungars cause residents of the Tarim Basin to flee to the Qing dynasty |

=== 1750s ===
| Year | Date | Event |
|---|---|---|
| 1755 | | Dzungar–Qing Wars: ʿAbdu l-Lāh Tarkhān Beg, Amin Khoja, Yusuf Beg, and Hakim Beg Hojis join the Qing dynasty in invading the Dzungar Khanate and fighting Amursana's rebellion |
| 1757 | | Revolt of the Altishahr Khojas: Khoja Burhan-ud-din and his brother Hojan rebel against the Qing dynasty in Yarkand |
| 1759 | | Revolt of the Altishahr Khojas: 100,000 Qing troops enter Xinjiang, forcing the Khoja brothers to flee to Badakhshan, where the sultan has them put to death and presented to the Qing; the entirety of the Tarim Basin is conquered by the Qing dynasty |

=== 1760s ===
| Year | Date | Event |
|---|---|---|
| 1762 | | An imperial governor-general is set up in Xinjiang, known as the Ili governor-general; Xinjiang is divided into three geographic units: the Ili and Tarbagatay regions, the eight cities south of the Tian Shan range, and Urumqi |

=== 1770s ===
| Year | Date | Event |
|---|---|---|
| 1777 | | Population of the Tarim Basin reaches 320,000 |

== 19th century ==
=== 1810s ===
| Year | Date | Event |
|---|---|---|
| 1814 | | Hereditary posts in Xinjiang are abolished |

=== 1820s ===
| Year | Date | Event |
|---|---|---|
| 1826 | | Population of the Tarim Basin reaches 650,000 |

== Bibliography ==
- Adle, Chahryar (2003), History of Civilizations of Central Asia 5
- Andrade, Tonio (2016), The Gunpowder Age: China, Military Innovation, and the Rise of the West in World History, Princeton University Press, ISBN 978-0-691-13597-7.
- Asimov, M.S. (1998), History of civilizations of Central Asia Volume IV The age of achievement: A.D. 750 to the end of the fifteenth century Part One The historical, social and economic setting, UNESCO Publishing
- Atwood, Christopher P. (2004), Encyclopedia of Mongolia and the Mongol Empire, Facts On File
- Barfield, Thomas (1989), The Perilous Frontier: Nomadic Empires and China, Basil Blackwell
- Barrett, Timothy Hugh (2008), The Woman Who Discovered Printing, Great Britain: Yale University Press, ISBN 978-0-300-12728-7 (alk. paper)
- Beckwith, Christopher I. (2009), Empires of the Silk Road: A History of Central Eurasia from the Bronze Age to the Present, Princeton University Press, ISBN 978-0-691-13589-2
- Beckwith, Christopher I (1987), The Tibetan Empire in Central Asia: A History of the Struggle for Great Power among Tibetans, Turks, Arabs, and Chinese during the Early Middle Ages, Princeton University Press
- Biran, Michal (2005), The Empire of the Qara Khitai in Eurasian History: Between China and the Islamic World, Cambridge Studies in Islamic Civilization, Cambridge, England: Cambridge University Press, ISBN 0521842263
- Bregel, Yuri (2003), An Historical Atlas of Central Asia, Brill
- Drompp, Michael Robert (2005), Tang China And The Collapse Of The Uighur Empire: A Documentary History, Brill
- Ebrey, Patricia Buckley (1999), The Cambridge Illustrated History of China, Cambridge: Cambridge University Press, ISBN 0-521-66991-X (paperback).
- Ebrey, Patricia Buckley; Walthall, Anne; Palais, James B. (2006), East Asia: A Cultural, Social, and Political History, Boston: Houghton Mifflin, ISBN 0-618-13384-4
- Golden, Peter B. (1992), An Introduction to the History of the Turkic Peoples: Ethnogenesis and State-Formation in Medieval and Early Modern Eurasia and the Middle East, OTTO HARRASSOWITZ · WIESBADEN
- Graff, David A. (2002), Medieval Chinese Warfare, 300-900, Warfare and History, London: Routledge, ISBN 0415239559
- Graff, David Andrew (2016), The Eurasian Way of War Military Practice in Seventh-Century China and Byzantium, Routledge, ISBN 978-0-415-46034-7.
- Grousset, Rene (1970), Empire of the Steppes
- Haywood, John (1998), Historical Atlas of the Medieval World, AD 600-1492, Barnes & Noble
- Latourette, Kenneth Scott (1964), The Chinese, their history and culture, Volumes 1-2, Macmillan
- Lorge, Peter A. (2008), The Asian Military Revolution: from Gunpowder to the Bomb, Cambridge University Press, ISBN 978-0-521-60954-8
- Luttwak, Edward N. (2009), The Grand Strategy of the Byzantine Empire, The Belknap Press of Harvard University Press
- Millward, James (2009), Eurasian Crossroads: A History of Xinjiang, Columbia University Press
- Mote, F. W. (2003), Imperial China: 900–1800, Harvard University Press, ISBN 978-0674012127
- Needham, Joseph (1986), Science & Civilisation in China, vol. V:7: The Gunpowder Epic, Cambridge University Press, ISBN 0-521-30358-3
- Rong, Xinjiang (2013), Eighteen Lectures on Dunhuang, Brill
- Schafer, Edward H. (1985), The Golden Peaches of Samarkand: A study of T'ang Exotics, University of California Press
- Shaban, M. A. (1979), The ʿAbbāsid Revolution, Cambridge: Cambridge University Press, ISBN 0-521-29534-3
- Sinor, Denis (1990), The Cambridge History of Early Inner Asia, Volume 1, Cambridge University Press
- Sima, Guang (2015), Bóyángbǎn Zīzhìtōngjiàn 54 huánghòu shīzōng 柏楊版資治通鑑54皇后失蹤, Yuǎnliú chūbǎnshìyè gǔfèn yǒuxiàn gōngsī, ISBN 978-957-32-0876-1
- Skaff, Jonathan Karam (2012), Sui-Tang China and Its Turko-Mongol Neighbors: Culture, Power, and Connections, 580-800 (Oxford Studies in Early Empires), Oxford University Press
- Standen, Naomi (2007), Unbounded Loyalty Frontier Crossings in Liao China, University of Hawai'i Press
- Steinhardt, Nancy Shatzman (1997), Liao Architecture, University of Hawaii Press
- Twitchett, Denis C. (1979), The Cambridge History of China, Vol. 3, Sui and T'ang China, 589–906, Cambridge University Press
- Twitchett, Denis (1994), "The Liao", The Cambridge History of China, Volume 6, Alien Regime and Border States, 907-1368, Cambridge: Cambridge University Press, pp. 43–153, ISBN 0521243319
- Twitchett, Denis (2009), The Cambridge History of China Volume 5 The Sung dynasty and its Predecessors, 907-1279, Cambridge University Press
- Wang, Zhenping (2013), Tang China in Multi-Polar Asia: A History of Diplomacy and War, University of Hawaii Press
- Wilkinson, Endymion (2015). Chinese History: A New Manual, 4th edition. Cambridge, MA: Harvard University Asia Center distributed by Harvard University Press. ISBN 9780674088467.
- Xiong, Victor Cunrui (2000), Sui-Tang Chang'an: A Study in the Urban History of Late Medieval China (Michigan Monographs in Chinese Studies), U OF M CENTER FOR CHINESE STUDIES, ISBN 0892641371
- Xiong, Victor Cunrui (2009), Historical Dictionary of Medieval China, United States of America: Scarecrow Press, Inc., ISBN 978-0810860537
- Xu, Elina-Qian (2005), HISTORICAL DEVELOPMENT OF THE PRE-DYNASTIC KHITAN, Institute for Asian and African Studies 7
- Xue, Zongzheng (1992), Turkic peoples, 中国社会科学出版社
- Yuan, Shu (2001), Bóyángbǎn Tōngjiàn jìshìběnmò 28 dìèrcìhuànguánshídài 柏楊版通鑑記事本末28第二次宦官時代, Yuǎnliú chūbǎnshìyè gǔfèn yǒuxiàn gōngsī, ISBN 957-32-4273-7
- Yule, Henry (1915), Cathay and the Way Thither: Being a Collection of Medieval Notices of China, Vol I: Preliminary Essay on the Intercourse Between China and the Western Nations Previous to the Discovery of the Cape Route, Hakluyt Society
