= Durrani–Qing relations =

Relations between the Durrani Empire and Qing Dynasty

- Durrani Empire: China

Diplomatic mission
- Establishment of relations & division of spheres of influence: Secure the Afghans as tributaries

Envoy
- Ahmad Shah Durrani: Qianlong Emperor

Between the Durrani Empire and the Qing dynasty, there were numerous encounters throughout the 18th century that nearly escalated to military conflict. Afghan Emperor Ahmad Shah Durrani and Qing Emperor Qianlong corresponded with each other by letters, including a dispatched Afghan embassy that reached Beijing to open relations between the two empires. The Afghans initially refused to kowtow, harming relations from its onset. Following the Afghan embassy's withdrawal, Qianlong began preparing for potential conflict. Later, Afghan forces invaded Emirate of Badakhshan, a Qing vassal state. The Qing refused to aid their vassal, recognizing their own weakness in the Altishahr region.

The encounter initially stemmed from numerous Islamic Central Asian chieftains, including the ruler of the Khanate of Kokand pleading to Ahmad Shah to halt Qing expansion in the region. Ahmad Shah utilized this to send an embassy to the Qing, propagating his own legitimacy and possibly intending to divide spheres of influence across Asia with the Qing. The embassy returned ultimately unsuccessful, leaving relations unestablished.

In 1768, Ahmad Shah dispatched his general, Shah Wali Khan, to invade Badakhshan, a then Qing vassal state. Despite the invasion being an effective threat to the Qing themselves and persuasion from Qing generals and agents, Qianlong did not intervene, and instead justified the Afghan attack. Qing forces were overextended, while extreme distance as well as lack of stability in the region prevented a military campaign, forcing the Qing to instead focus on their own harsh terrain to prevent an Afghan invasion.

The encounters entered Qing historiography and art, with numerous poems, and decorative fans being created. Famous paintings by Giuseppe Castiglione had also recorded Afghan gifts to the Qing court, the Four Afghan Steeds.

== Qing–Afghan confrontation ==
=== Afghan embassy ===
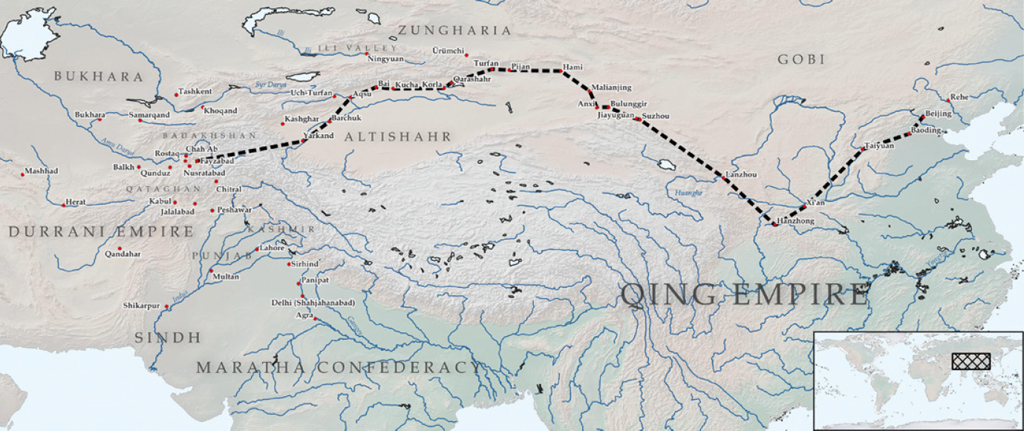
Map of the route the Afghan embassy undertook to the Qing dynasty in 1763

Numerous Central Asian rulers such as Fazil Biy, the ruler of Khujand, Irdana Biy, the ruler of Kokand, and even a Kazakh Sultan pleaded to Ahmad Shah Durrani, the ruler of the Durrani Empire, to aid them against Qing expansionism. Ahmad Shah accepted the call for aid, and began preparing by occupying the regions between Tashkent and Kokand in 1763, though later withdrawing as it became clear the Qing did not intend to invade. Later emissaries from the Russian Empire also attempted to encourage the Afghans to commit to an anti-Qing campaign, but withdrew after arriving at Herat upon learning Ahmad Shah was committed to a campaign in India in 1764 with no clear intention of advancing north.

In 1763, Ahmad Shah had dispatched an embassy to the Qing. His aims in this are unknown, however, an embassy allowed Ahmad Shah to establish himself as an emperor. The letter he sent to the Qing emperor Qianlong is missing, but from the Qing reply, the letter was likely dedicated to his conquests and victory at Panipat, alongside Qing expansion. Emperor Qianlong referred to Ahmad Shah's military victory of the Panipat battle:

Furthermore, you stated in your letter that when Balaji Baji Rao, ruler of the Marathas, had heard of your conquest of the city of Jahānābād (Delhi), he united his neighboring tribes, combining them into a force of many hundreds of thousands of mounted and foot soldiers. He led all of them to a place called Karnal to do battle with you, but when they heard of your personal presence, they became terrified and ensconced themselves inside the city of Panipat. After a siege of six months, you killed thirty-five great Begs, slaughtered over a hundred thousand troops, and obtained a tremendous amount of tools and vessels, gold, and silver. Balaji was able to assemble such a force and then did not attack, but instead retreated to the fortress-city of Panipat to sit and wait for annihilation. That is a matter I truly cannot understand.

When the Afghan embassy had arrived in Beijing, the chief envoy, Khwaja Mirhan, had refused to kowtow before the Qing emperor. Shocked by his actions, the Qing officials demanded that Mirhan perform the kowtow, which he eventually did. This incident damaged Qing-Afghan relations and Qianlong cut ties with the Afghans following this. No immediate consequence occurred, and the envoy was shown favor, while the letter from Ahmad Shah was presented.

The letter positioned Ahmad Shah's expansions as bringing order and stability to areas overrun with rebels and lawlessness (in reference to his campaigns in present-day Iran and Pakistan (Khyber & the Punjab)). The battle of Panipat was strongly detailed in the letter, in what was likely a fath-nama. (Note: "From these retellings, it is clear that Aḥmad Shāh was producing what is known in Persian epistolary (inshā’) terminology as a fatḥ-nāma, a ‘letter of victory.’ The fatḥ-nāma was meant to celebrate and inflate a king’s military victory in lucid language, reflecting on his power and the obligation of kings to order human affairs and fight tyranny and unbelief.") The Qing emperor ignored the effective threat.

In the second part of the letter, Qianlong appeared much more defensive, justifying the Qing conquest of the Dzungars and the Altishahr Khojas. He accused them of causing devastation and laying false accusations against him. A report also suggested that Ahmad Shah considered the territories the Qing claimed belonged to the Muslims. In reality, Ahmad Shah possibly wanted to establish spheres of influence, which was similarly done with the Ottomans which divided Iran between them, and a treaty with Bukhara that had established the Amu Darya as the border.

Why has your Khan dispatched you? Has your Khan not sent you to appear at an audience with the brilliance of our Great Lord? Our Great Lord is the ruler who has united All under Heaven. Besides you Afghans, as soon as people from the West, Russia, even the former Zunghars came, all of them promptly prostrated themselves before the Great Lord. He is like Heaven; do you not bow before Heaven?

— A Qing grand councillor, remarking at the Afghan envoy's refusal to Kowtow

Mirhan's refusal to kowtow likely came out of religious reasons, but the Qing received it as Ahmad Shah declaring himself equal to Qianlong. From Qianlong's view, he saw the Afghans as a significant power and attempted to impress the envoy and in contrast, Ahmad Shah, of the Qing empire. This was especially done in motivation of Altishahr's recent conquest and concerns over stability in the region. Nonetheless, by the time of the envoy's return journey to Afghanistan, Qianlong made preparations to secure Qing territories.

=== Afaqis ===
In 1759, as the revolt of the Altishahr Khojas crumbled, two descendants of the Afaqi Sufi lineage crossed into Badakhshan pursued by the Qing forces. Fude, the Qing general of the expedition, demanded that Sultan Shah, the ruler of Badakhshan, arrest the brothers. Sultan Shah accepted, likely wishing to receive Qing military aid against the Durrani Empire. However, the parties mistrusted each other, as the Afaqis resided in Badakhshan for months while Sultan Shah initially refused to extradite them, possibly intending to send them to Bukhara. Qianlong threatened invasion, which did not occur as one of the descendant's remains were sent to Yarkand.

The death of the Afaqi brothers harmed relations with the Afghans, causing Sultan Shah to plead to the Qing, claiming that Ahmad Shah intended to exact revenge for their deaths. No immediate Afghan invasion occurred. The Qing however, faced numerous frustrations with their tributaries in Central Asia, alongside a major insurrection in Uch-Turfan that required tremendous effort to defeat.

As a result, Qianlong adopted a policy of strict non-interference, realizing that Qing troops in Altishahr were significantly stretched and spread thin. The Afghans, however, seen as a threat, would show the weakness of Qing control in the region.

=== Afghan invasion of Badakhshan ===
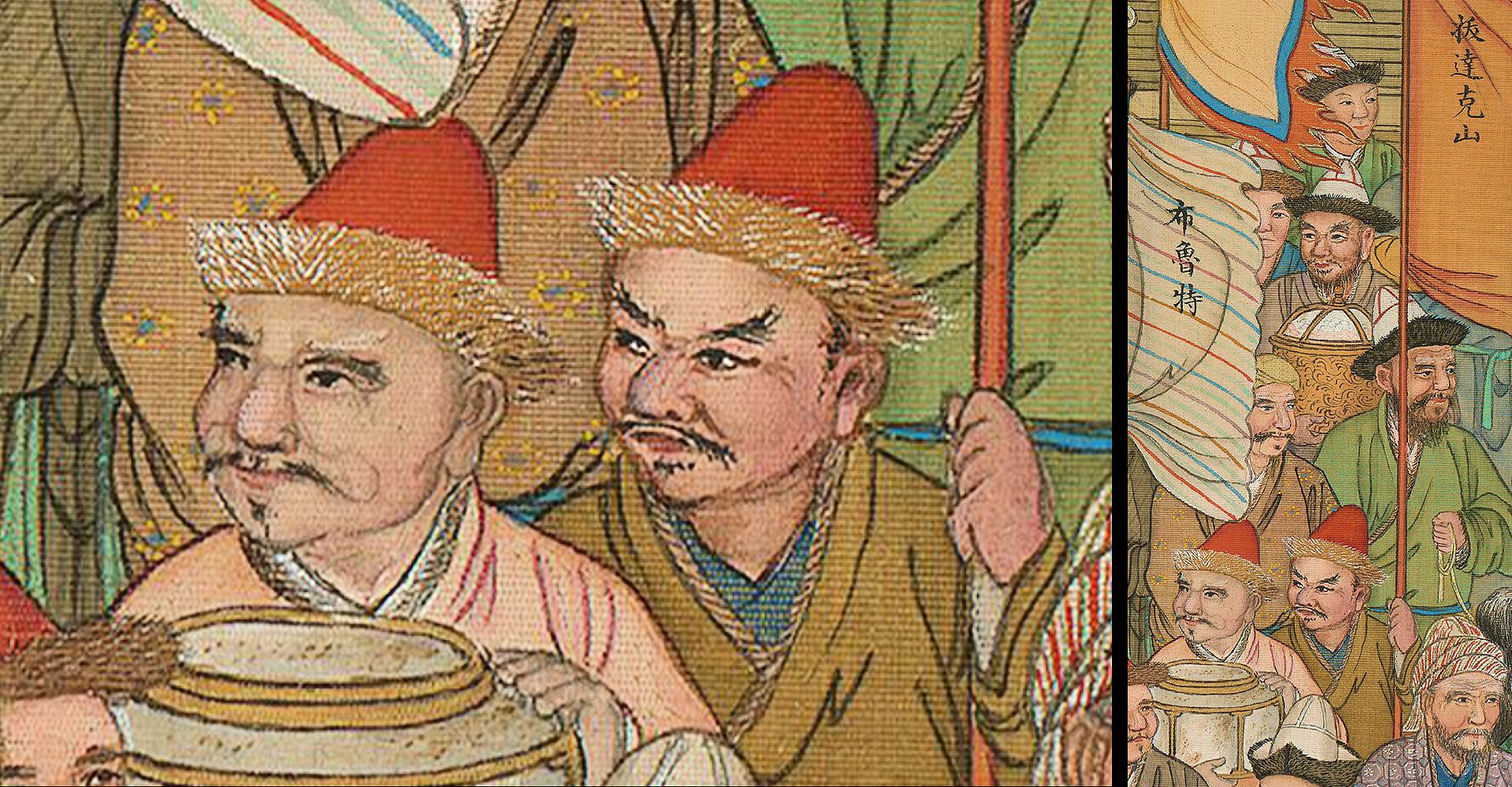
Delegates from Badakhshan in Peking, 1761

In August 1768, Qianlong was informed of the Afghan invasion of Badakhshan led by Shah Wali Khan in May, with Afghan forces seizing Sultan Shah's capital, Fayzabad. A Qing agent, Yunggui, advised that the Qing should interfere in the conflict. However, Qianlong made it clear that military intervention would be irrational, and strictly forbade any military interference. Historians see this as surprising, as the invasion by the Afghans threatened the Qing Empire itself. Though as early as 1767, Qianlong had begun shifting Qing policy toward non-interference, refusing to meddle in the affairs of the Kazakh Khanate.

Qing sources say that the Afghans established Sarimsaq, a child of the Afaqi's who escaped to Badakhshan, in Kunduz. Qianlong was distraught, as another possible revolt could revolve around Sarimsaq, especially after reports came of Muslim travelers and funds being sent to Sarimsaq. Qianlong remained unconvinced and chose not to complain to Ahmad Shah. During this, Sultan Shah defeated the Afghan governor and reoccupied his capital, but fearing another Afghan invasion, sent desperate letters to the Qing in the winter of 1768 to ask for help, requesting over 10,000 men and claiming that Ahmad Shah would invade next year.

But Qianlong blamed Sultan Shah for provoking the conflict with the Afghans, and said that he would only fight the Afghans if they actually invaded Qing territory. Sultan Shah wrote a letter to Emin Khoja in response in August 1769, expecting aid as he was a vassal, only to find himself abandoned. In December 1769, Sultan Shah wrote another letter that accused Qianlong of failing to uphold his duties. Qianlong rebuked him, and stated that under no circumstances would the Qing aid him. Within the year, Ahmad Shah occupied Badakhshan, seizing numerous districts south of the Amu Darya, and Sultan Shah was executed.

We have long known that you have previously presented gifts to the Afghans. That you now have no more options but to evade the issue just shows that you are paying tribute to the Afghans! […] If you cannot protect your own lands, and wish to submit to the Afghans, then suit yourself! […] If you wish to rely on our armies to serve your enmities and to subjugate your neighboring tribes, then we will under no circumstances provide you with our troops.

— Qianlong's reply to Sultan Shah's plea for aid against Ahmad Shah

== Aftermath and conclusion of encounters ==
Qianlong recognized that they could not treat the Afghans like tributaries. Rather than aiding the ruler of Badakhshan as his initial policy implied, Qianlong ignored the Afghan invasion, and relied on the distance between the Afghan and Qing realms to avoid military conflict. The Qing were beset by problems including overextended armies, and lack of stability.

In his response, Qianlong attempted to incorporate the Afghans into a submissive tributary state, a position which Ahmad Shah never sought, nor recognized. On his behalf, the embassy sent had accomplished legitimacy of his own empire. Badakhshan, a wild card in the region, had destroyed the idea of friendly relations, as Afghan expansion into the region and tensions brewed around it.

Refusing to publicly acknowledge the rival Afghan power, Qianlong instead justified a policy of non-interference into Central Asia throughout his reign, unable to consolidate Qing control in the region. By the 1790s Kokand became a center of Qing resistance, while the Durrani Empire began its decline and no further embassies were exchanged between the Afghans and the Qing, ending their diplomatic engagements.

== Art depictions ==
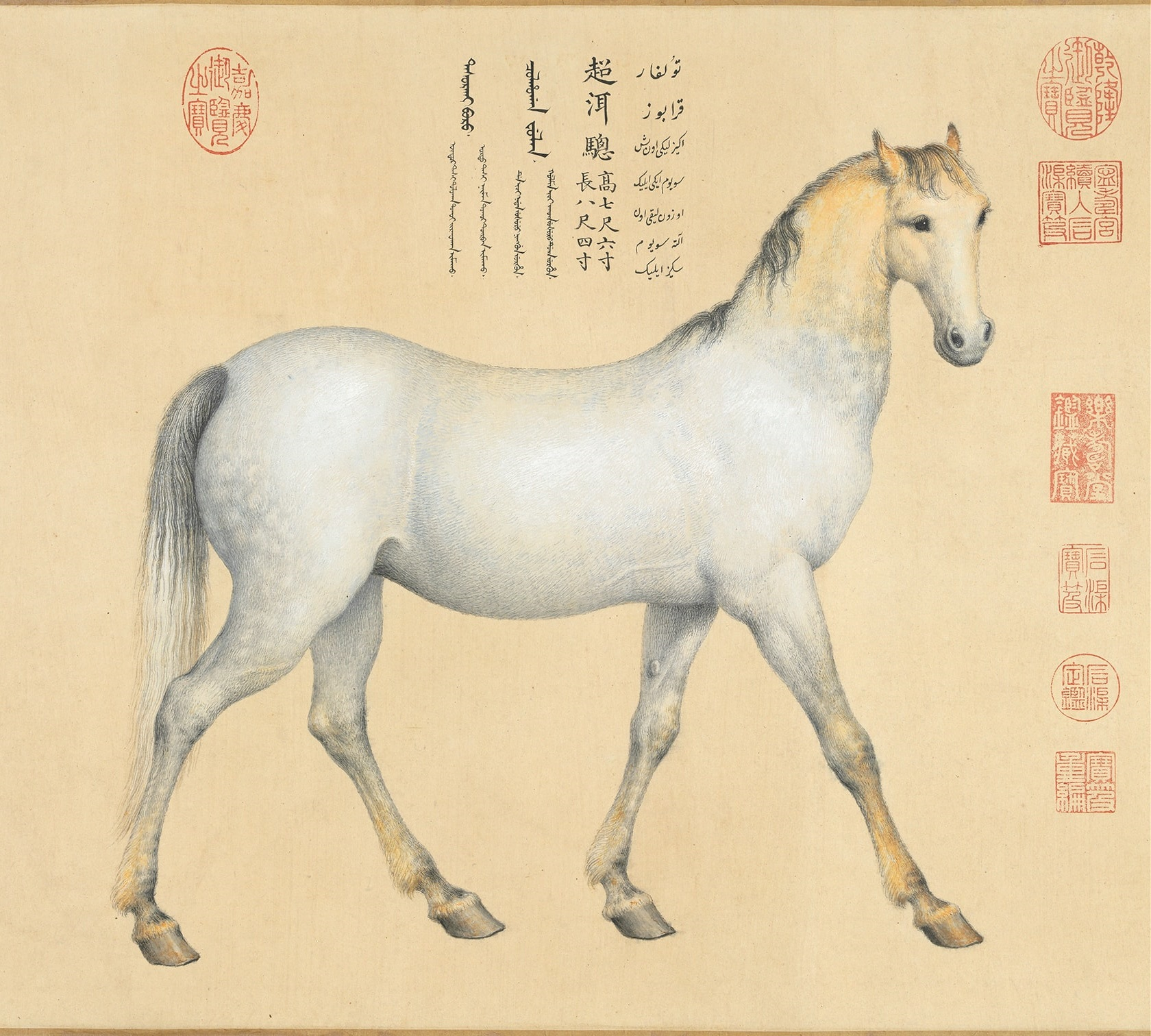
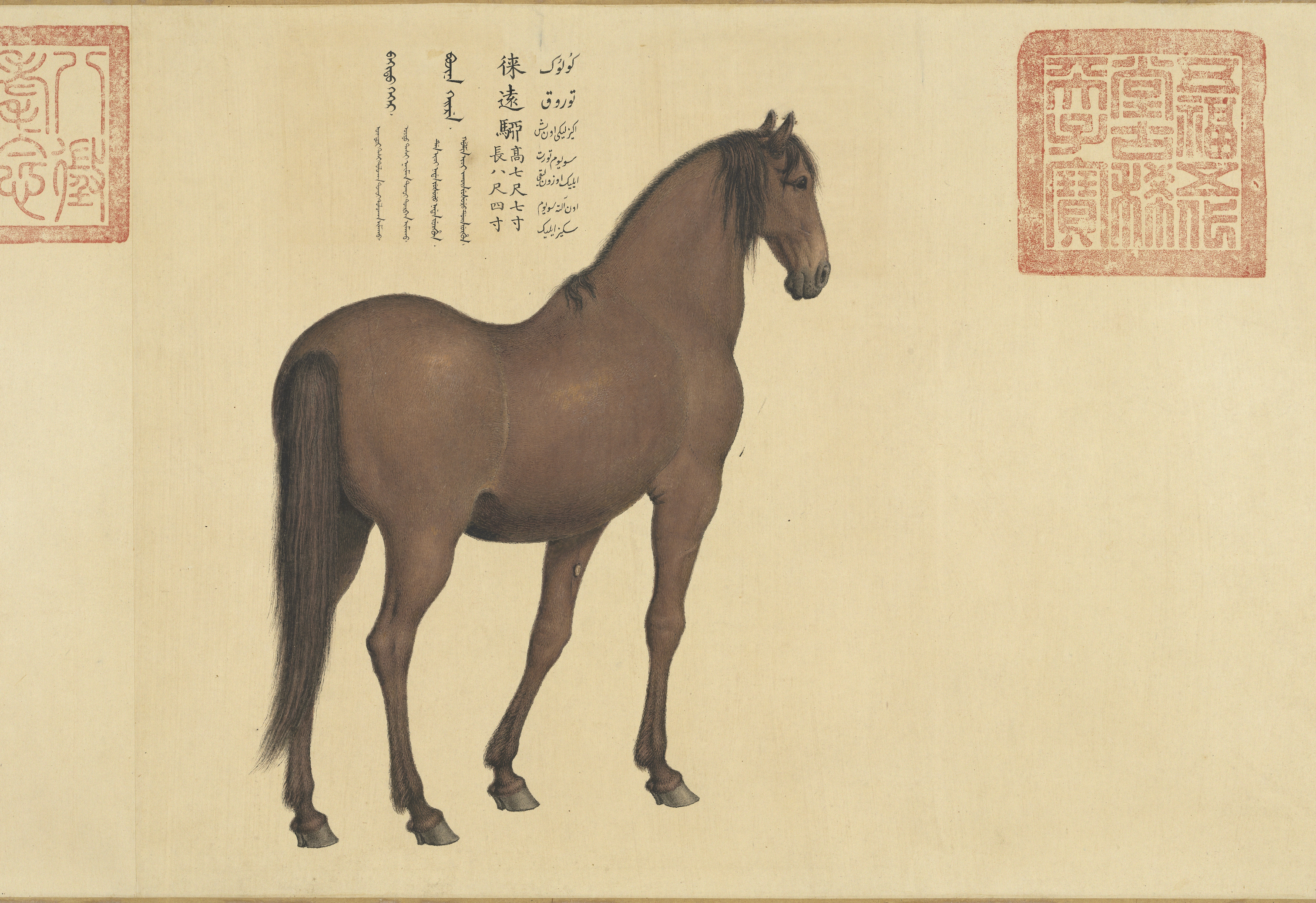
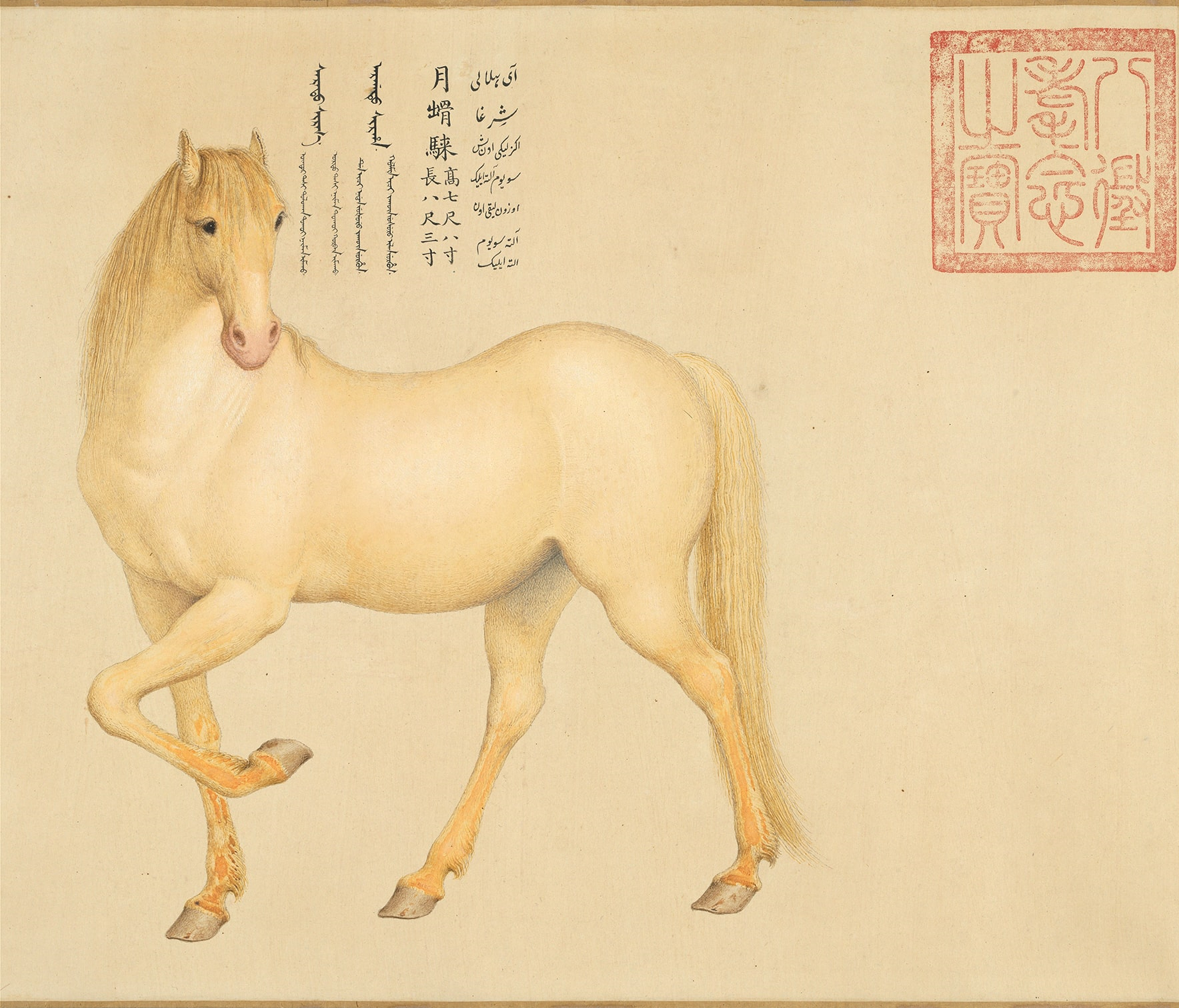
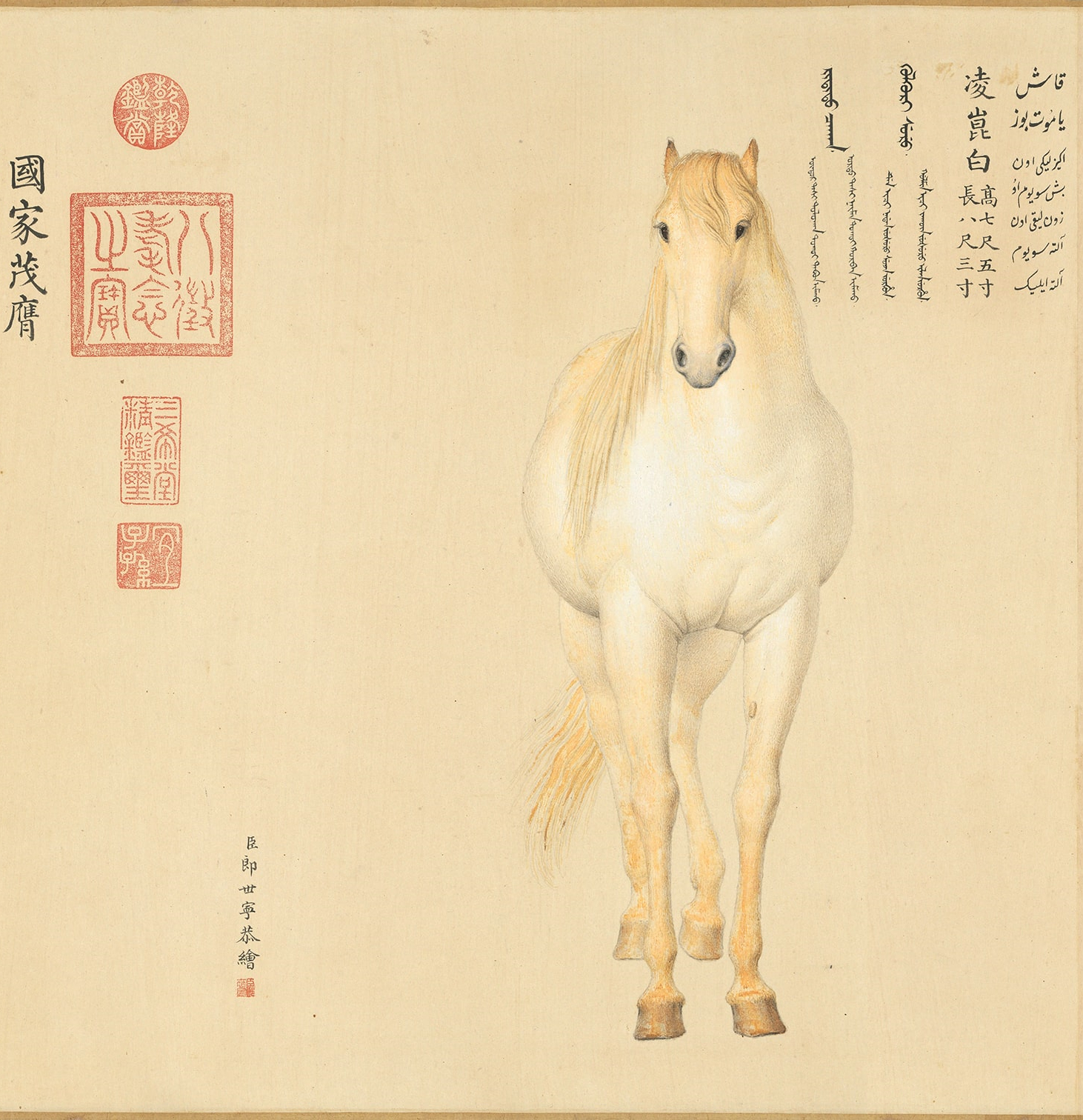
Depiction of the four Afghan horses sent by Ahmad Shah, painted by Qing court painter Giuseppe Castiglione

Ahmad Shah's gifts to the Qing emperor included four horses, which were painted by the Qing court painter, Giuseppe Castiglione, becoming one of his most famous works. Poems and decorative fans commemorating the embassy were also made, all trying to show the Afghans as tributaries of the Qing empire.
