= Revolt of the Altishahr Khojas =

18th-century uprising in China

- Part of the Afaqi Khoja revolts
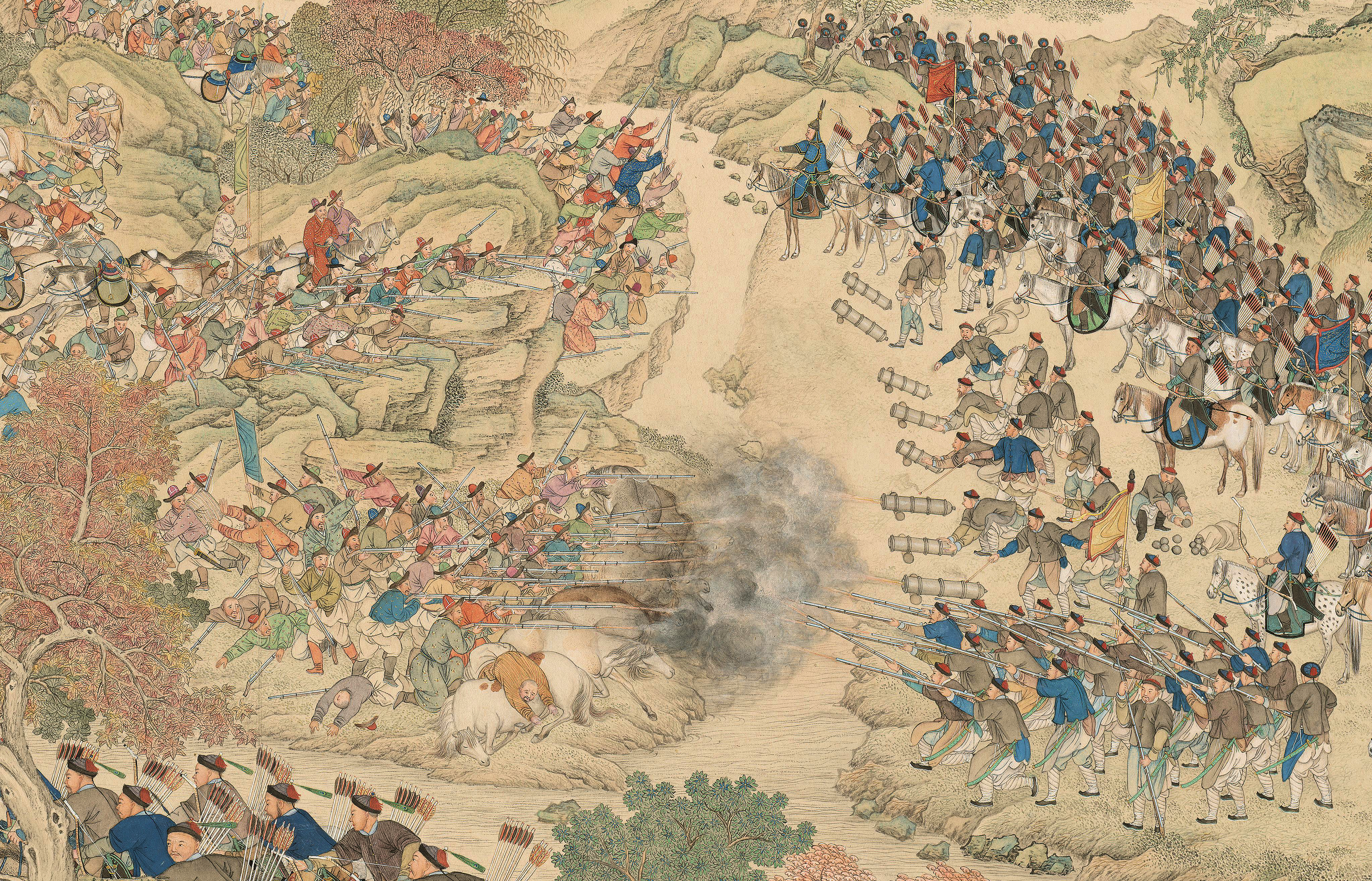
- Khoja rebels and Qing soldiers fighting at the Battle of Yesil-kol-nor near Yashilkul Lake, 1759. Painted by Jean-Damascène Sallusti in 1764.
Date	1757–1759
Location	Modern day southwest Xinjiang, China; Eastern Tajikistan; Eastern Afghanistan
Result	Khoja defeat Territory integrated into the Qing dynasty of China

Belligerents
Altishahr Khojas	Qing dynasty Badakhshan

Commanders and leaders
Khwāja Jihān; Burhān ud-Dīn; Abdul Karim ʿAbd ul-Khāliq; Hasan Adil; Osman	Qianlong Emperor; Zhaohui (Manchu); Yarhašan (Manchu); Emin Khoja (Uighur); Yūsuf (Kumul) (Uighur); Namjal (Mongol); Shi Santai (Han); Fude (Manchu); Arigun (Manchu); Mingrui (Manchu)

Strength
Khwāja Jihān >10,000; Burhān ud-Dīn >5,000	c. 200,000 in the later stages (Khalkha Mongols, Dzungars, Eight Banners, Green Standard Army, Mongolian Eight Banners, Hui Battalion (回營; Uygurs), Chahar Banners, Solons, Kyrgyzs)

Casualties and losses
Unknown	Unknown

The Revolt of the Altishahr Khojas (Chinese: 大小和卓之亂) was an uprising against the Qing dynasty of China, which broke out in 1757 during the reign of the Qianlong Emperor. The rebels were led by Khwāja-i Jahān (also known as Hojijan, Huojizhan; nickname: "Younger Khoja" 小和卓), leader of the White Mountain Sufis. Qing era documents refer to the event as the "Pacification of the Muslim regions" (平定回部; Píngdìng Huíbù). Khwāja Jihān and his brother, Burhān al-Dīn (also known as Buranidun, Boluonidu; nickname: "Elder Khoja" 大和卓), both held the Muslim title Khoja.

After the Qing conquest of Dzungaria at the end of the Dzungar–Qing Wars in 1755, the Khoja Brothers were released from Dzungar captivity whereupon they began to recruit followers in the Western Regions around Altishahr. Not long afterwards, the Khoit-Oirat prince Amursana rose up against the Qing and the Khoja Brothers used the opportunity to seize control of the south west part of Xinjiang.

In 1757, Khwāja-i Jahān killed the Qing Vice General Amindao. Qianlong retaliated the following year by sending troops to locations including Kuqa County, Yarkant (modern day Yarkant County) and Hotan (modern day Hotan Prefecture) to attack the Khoja brothers. In 1759, the rebel army fled west through the Pamir Mountains to Badakhshan (now part of north east Afghanistan) where it was captured and destroyed by the ruling Sultan Shah, causing the revolt to subside.

With the revolt pacified, the Qing completed the reintegration of their territory in one of Qianlong's Ten Great Campaigns. The end of the conflict saw the restoration of the territory south of the Tian Shan to Qing control meaning that the Qing now controlled the whole of Xinjiang. After the appointment of an Altishahr Grand Ministerial Attache the Xinjiang area remained peaceful for the next 60 years.

The revolt was a catalyst to confrontations between the Qianlong and Durrani Afghanistan under Ahmad Shah Durrani in a series of events known as the Durrani–Qing relations.

== Background ==
=== The White Mountain Khoja and the Zhuo Clan ===
The ancestor of the Khoja brothers was Ahmad Kasani (1461–1542) also known as Makhdūm-i`Azam, "the Great Master" of the Central Asian Naqshbandi Sufi Sect. Kasani claimed to be a descendant of Muhammad through his daughter whose offspring were known as the Khojas. The family was in turn divided into the Qarataghlik ("Black Mountain") Khojas and the Aqtāghlïq ("White Mountain") Khojas (formerly known as the Ishaqiyya Khojas and the Afaqiyya Khojas respectively). Together they were known as the Altishahr ("Tarim Basin") Khojas.

In the middle of the Ming dynasty (1368-1644), the Black Mountain Khoja received approval from the ruling Yarkand Khanate for the Altishahr or Tarim Basin area south of the Tian Shan range in the Western Regions to convert to Islam. In the mid-17th century, the White Mountain Khoja leader Muhammed Yusef Khoja (d. 1653) came from Central Asia to Kashgar to prosleytze only to be driven out by the Yarkand Khanate and the Black Mountain Khojas. Yusef Khoja's son Afaq Khoja escaped to Hezhou (河州; modern day Linxia City) in China's Gansu Province. From there, he went to Tibet to obtain the support of the 5th Dalai Lama and the Dzunghar Mongols under Galdan Boshugtu Khan.

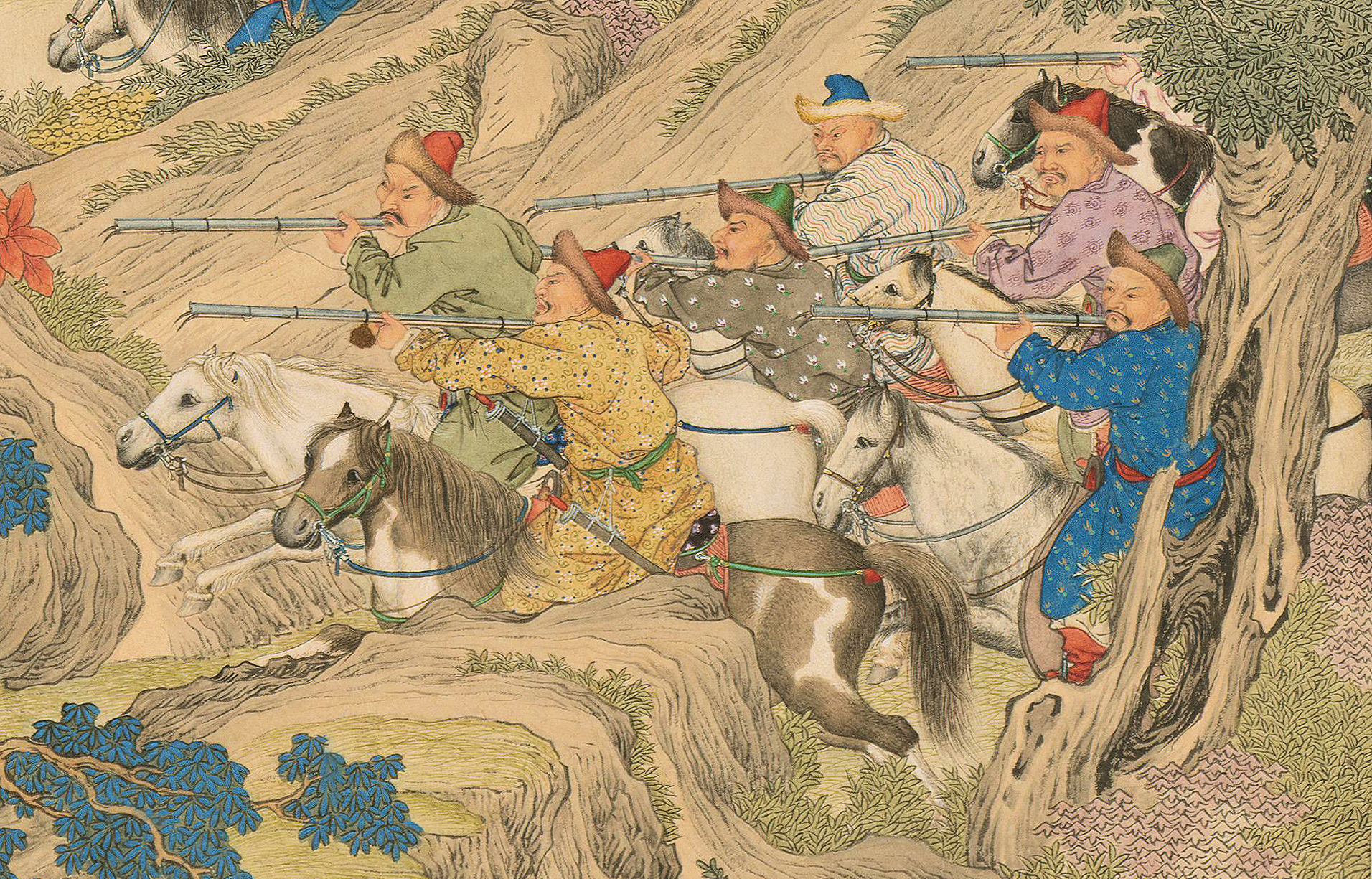
Khojas cavalry at the Battle of Arcul (1759). Painting by Jean Denis Attiret.

In 1680, during the reign of the Qing Kangxi Emperor, the Dzungars under Galdan Boshugtu Khan, with the help of Afaq Khoja, invaded Yarkand and deposed the ruling Khan, Ismail Khan. Galden then installed Abd ar-Rashid Khan II as Khan of Yarkand. Afaq Khoja soon afterwards fled from Yarkand following discord with the new ruler. Two years later, in 1682, riots erupted in Yarkand causing Abd ar-Rashid Khan II to flee to Ili. His younger brother Muhammad Amin then became Khan.

The riots of around 1682 led to the overthrow of Muhammad Amin Khan by the followers of Afaq Khoja, whose son Yahya Khoja became the ruler of Yarkand and Kashgar.

Two years later, Afaq Khoja died and the Kashgar region sank into a civil war involving the Yarkand Khanate, White Mountain Khoja, Kyrgyz and the local begs.

After Tsewang Rabtan succeeded to the leadership of the Dzungar Khanate in 1697 he imprisoned the descendants of the Altishahr Khojas in what is now known as Ili Kazakh Autonomous Prefecture. When Galdan Tseren came to power in 1727, he gave Black Mountain Khoja, Daniyal (Persian: خواجہ دانیال; simplified Chinese: 达涅尔; traditional Chinese: 達涅爾; pinyin: Dániè'ěr) responsibility for the political and economic affairs of Yarkand and Kashgar. At the same time, Afaq Khoja's grandson Ahmad (玛罕木特) died in captivity. Afaq's second grandson Burhān ud-Dīn, the "Elder Khoja", was imprisoned east of Yili at Iren-Chabirgan (額林哈畢爾噶) (now Erenhabirga Mountains 依连哈比尔尕山) in the custody of the local Dzungar Tribal Administrator or Zaisan, Abagas (Авгас, 阿巴噶斯) and his brother Khatan (Хатан, 哈丹).

=== Dawachi and Amursana split ===
After Galdan Tseren died in 1745, the Dzungar Khanate fell into internecine warfare. In the end, Dawachi, who was the grandson of Khong Tayiji Tsewang Rabtan's cousin Tserendondov the Elder, became Khan. His comrade in arms, taisha or prince of the Khoit Dzungar tribe, Amursana, was richly rewarded for his loyalty.

However, in 1754, Dawachi and Amursana quarreled and the latter defected to the Qing, taking with him 5,000 soldiers and 20,000 women and children. He then demanded permission to travel to Beijing and seek the emperor's assistance in defeating Dawachi and retaking Ili and neighbouring Kashgar. Amursana's persuasive manner and Qianlongs's ambition and love for military renown meant that in the end he agreed, throwing in a princedom of the first degree (雙親王; 双亲王), which entitled Amursana to double stipends and privileges, as a bonus.

=== Surrender of the Dzungars ===
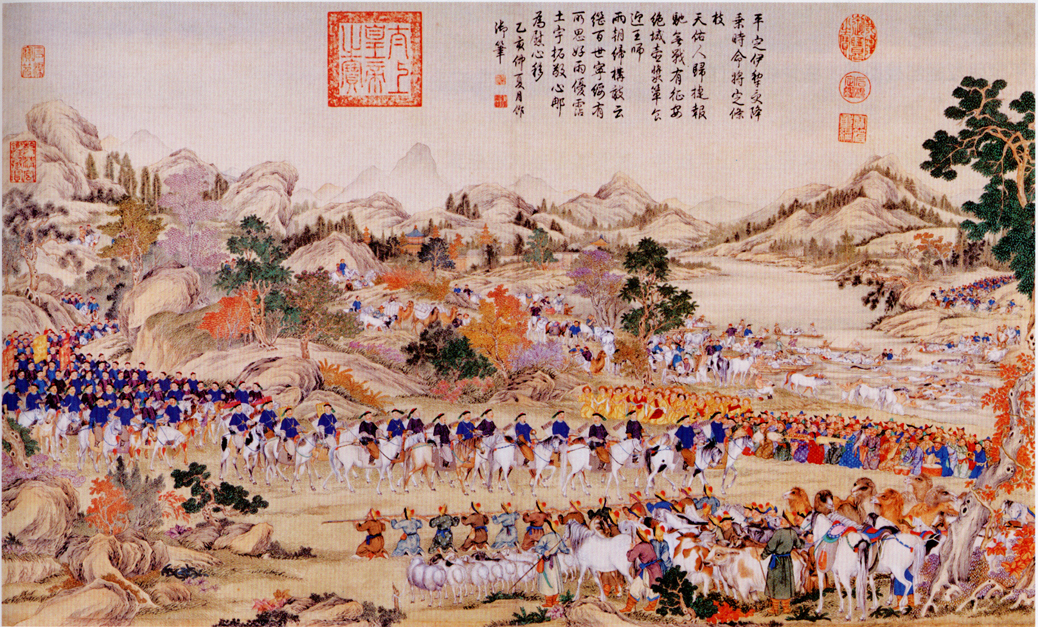
Qing troops enter Ili

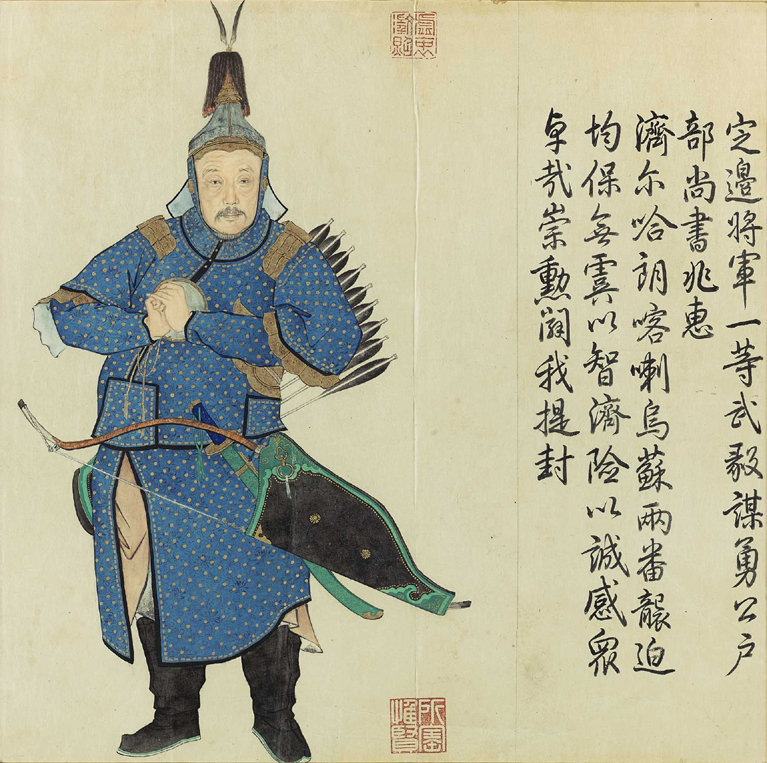
Zhao Hui, a Qing Manchu bannerman general

In the first lunar month of 1755, two units of the Qing army, each consisting of 25,000 men carrying two months' of rations per man, entered Dzungaria from two different directions to destroy Dawachi's army and retake the territory. The Northern Route Army under commander Bandi comprised Border Pacifying Vice-general of the Left Wing Amursana, Amban Sebtenbaljur and Mukden Commander Alantai while Border Pacifying Vice-general of the Right Wing Saral and Minister of the Interior (內大臣) Oyonggo formed the Western Route Army with the West Pacifying General (定西將軍; Dìngxī jiāngjūn) Yong Chang in command. The two armies linked up at Bortala; now the Bortala Mongol Autonomous Prefecture). During the subsequent march, Abagas and Khatan among others surrendered to the Qing forces.

On 8 April 1755, Burhān ud-Dīn surrendered to Saral's Western Route Army saying "At the time of Galdan Tseren, my father was imprisoned and thus far I have not been released. I will bring perhaps 30 of my households to surrender to the emperor and become his servants" Not long afterwards, the Younger Khoja, Khwāja-i Jahān, surrendered to Bandi with Khatan.

In May, Qing forces entered Huocheng County in Ili. Bandi planned to send Burhān ud-Dīn to Beijing for presentation to the emperor while Khwāja-i Jahān would be kept in Ili in the care of the nomadic Muslim Taranchi.

The Us Beg Khojis received orders from Bandi to establish sentry posts on the mountain passes into the Tarim Basin. When a further order to prepare for war arrived, Khojis' troops hid in the woods while his younger brother was dispatched to take wine and horses to Davachi—who when he arrived was seized along with his men and his son Lobja. The prisoners were then escorted under guard to the Qing barracks by Khojis and 200 of his men. Dawachi's capture effectively marked the end of the Dzungar Khanate.

At the same time, Kashgar Black Mountain Khoja Yusuf (second son of Daniyal) marched north. Aksu's Hakim Beg Abd-Qwabu (Khojis' elder brother) suggested to Bandi that the Qing Army send an emissary along with them during the transport of the Khoja brothers to Kashgar. Abodouguabo further announced his appointment as ruler of the area at the behest of Qianlong. As a result, Bandi dispatched the Imperial Bodyguard, Dolondai, and Khojis as protective escort on the journey south to Kashgar and Yarkand. Khwāja-i Jahān was to remain in Ili to supervise of Khojis' clan. Troops would gather at Uqturpan County to defeat the northern Black Mountain Khoja then head south. Once in Kashgar Hakim Beg would take the surrender of the city. Although Xinjiang's Black Mountain Khoja leader Jihan Khoja (加罕和卓), also known as Yaqub, and Yusuf's eldest brother, put up a fierce defence of Kashgar until he was finally killed.

=== Amursana's Revolt ===
With Dawachi on his way to Beijing as a captive, Amursana now saw an opportunity to establish himself as the new Dzungar Khan with control of the four Oirat tribes of Dzungaria. Qianlong had other ideas. The emperor knew that Amursana had long had his sights set on Dzungaria but "had not dared to do anything rash." As a result, before the military expedition to Ili had set out and fearing the rise of a new Mongolian empire, Qialong had proclaimed that the four Oirat clans of Dzungaria would be resettled in their own territory each with their own Khan appointed directly by Beijing. Amursana spurned the offer of khanship over the Khoits and told Bandi to inform the Emperor that he wanted control of all the Oirats. Amursana received orders to return to Beijing but sensing that if he left Ili he might never be able to return, on 24 September 1755 he escaped from his escort en route to the Qing imperial resort at Chengde and returned to Tarbaghatai (now Tacheng in Xinjiang, China), 400 kilometres (250 mi) east of Ürümqi. The Ili zaisan or chief and his lamas then seized the city. In the chaos, Khwāja-i Jahān led a band of Uyghur and escaped from the Ili basin. Other White Mountain Khojas imprisoned in Dzugaria including Ḥusein (Chinese: 額色尹; pinyin: Ésèyǐn) (Khwāja-i Jahān's uncle) and Muḥammad (Chinese: 禡木特) were unwilling to follow Khwāja-i Jahān and instead fled to Kokand and other places. At the end of the year, Amursana sent an envoy to tell Burhān ud-Dīn of the fall of Ili. Mongolian soldiers Dolondai (Долондай, 托伦泰) and Tögüs (Төгс, 特古斯; Saral's elder brother) were captured by Burhān ud-Dīn.

In March 1756, West Pacifying General Ts῾ereng arrived with the Western Route Army to recapture Ili. Amursana fled into the Kazakh Khanate as the tables were once again turned on him. Khwāja-i Jahān and Burhān ud-Dīn united the local population in May, then Khwāja-i Jahān killed Amursana's envoy. Dolondai defected to the rebel side and was sent to ascertain the strength of the Qing Garrison in Ili.

== Course of events ==
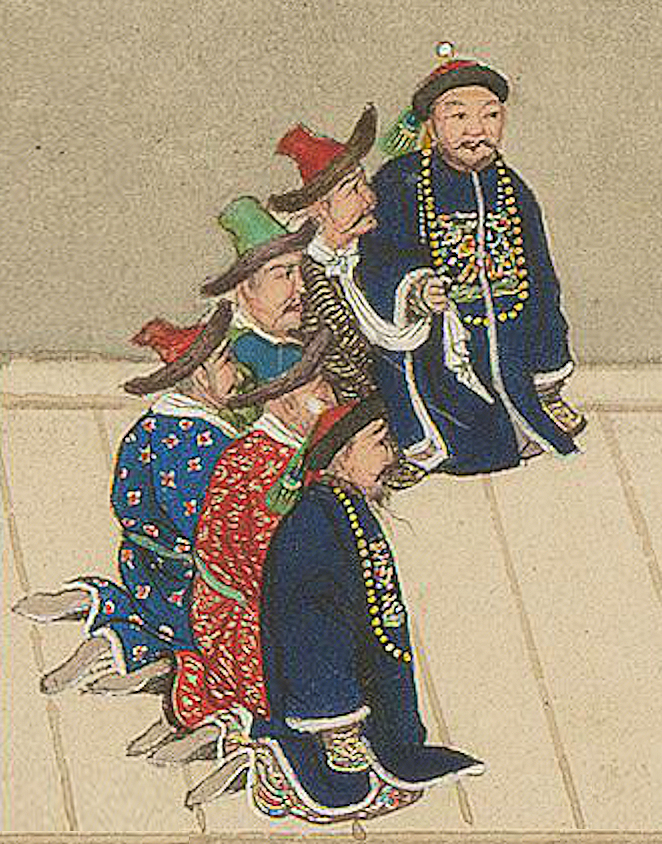
Presentation to the Emperor of Muslim prisoners (guarded by two Qing attendants) taken during the "Subjugation of the Muslim Tribes" in 1759 (detail). Painting by Jean Denis Attiret.

Khwāja-i Jahān sought independence from the Qing regime and told the local clan leaders: "We have just been freed from the slavery of the Dzungars, and now if we surrender to the Qing, we will have to pay tribute. It will be better to rule this region ourselves; working the land and defending the cities will be sufficient for resistance." Burhān ud-Dīn was unwilling to take on the Qing Army: "We were once humiliated by Dzungaria; if not for the Qing military's help, how could we have returned to our homeland? We must not turn our backs on kindness and fight with Qing." An envoy sent by Khwāja-i Jahān then killed Chagatai Khan descendant and former Yarkand chief, Ikh Khoja (伊克和卓) and Khwāja-i Jahān took the title Batur Khan (Баатар хаан) after the founder of the Dzungar Khanate Erdeni Batur. Burhān ud-Dīn advised against the move: "We were the third generation of our family to be imprisoned by the Dzungars. Through the kindness of the Qing emperor, we were freed and have received further profound grace to be appointed the chiefs in the Muslim region. If you betray the Qing dynasty, you will have to face the Qing alone and I will not obey you." However, Khwāja-i Jahān persisted with his view. In 1757 he killed the Qing vice general Amindao, declaring rebellion.

In 1758, in addition to the remaining Dzungars, the Khoja rebels were also joined by the Kyrgyz peoples and the Oases Turkic peoples (Uyghurs) in Altishahr (the Tarim Basin). After capturing several towns in Altishahr, there were still two rebel fortresses at Yarkand and Kashgar at the end of 1758. Uyghur Muslims from Turfan and Hami, including Emin Khoja and Khoja Si Bek, remained loyal to the Qing dynasty and helped the Qing regime fight the Altishahri Uyghurs under Burhān al-Dīn and Khwāja-i Jahān. Zhaohui unsuccessfully besieged Yarkand and fought an indecisive battle outside the city; this engagement is historically known as the Battle of Tonguzluq. Zhaohui instead took other towns east of Yarkand but was forced to retreat; the Dzungar and Uyghur rebels laid siege to him at the siege of Black River (Kara Usu). In 1759, Zhaohui asked for reinforcements and 600 troops were sent, under the overall command of generals Fude and Machang, with the 200 cavalry led by Namjil; other high-ranking officers included Arigun, Doubin, Duanjibu, Fulu, Yan Xiangshi, Janggimboo, Yisamu, Agui and Shuhede. On 3 February 1759, over 5,000 enemy cavalry led by Burhān al-Dīn ambushed the 600 relief troops at the Battle of Qurman. The Uyghur and Dzungar cavalry were stopped by the Qing zamburak artillery camels, musketry, and archers; Namjil and Machang led a cavalry charge on one of the flanks. Namjil was killed while Machang was unseated from horseback and was forced to fight on foot with his bow. After a hard-fought battle, the Qing forces emerged victorious and attacked the Dzungar camp, causing the Dzungars besieging the Black River to withdraw. After the victory at Qurman, the Qing army overran the remaining rebel towns. Mingrui led a detachment of cavalry and defeated Dzungar cavalry at the Battle of Qos-Qulaq. The Uyghurs retreated from Qos-Qulaq but were defeated by Zhaohui and Fude at the Battle of Arcul (Altishahr) on 1 September 1759. The rebels were defeated again at the Battle of Yesil Kol Nor.

== Aftermath ==
In 1759, as the revolt of the Altishahr Khojas crumbled, the Khoja brothers crossed into Badakhshan pursued by the Qing forces. Fude, the Qing general of the expedition, demanded that Sultan Shah, the ruler of Badakhshan, arrest the brothers. Sultan Shah accepted, likely wishing to receive Qing military aid against the Durrani Empire. However, the parties mistrusted each other, as the brothers resided in Badakhshan for months while Sultan Shah initially refused to extradite them, possibly intending to send them to Bukhara. Qianlong threatened invasion, which did not occur as one of the brothers' remains were sent to Yarkand. The death of the Khojas damaged relations with Ahmad Shah Durrani, the Afghan emperor of the Durrani Empire, leading to a series of diplomatic confrontations during the period of Durrani–Qing relations. Sultan Shah to plead to the Qing, claiming that Ahmad Shah intended to exact revenge for their deaths. No immediate Afghan invasion occurred.

Because trade with Xinjiang was the economic lifeline of the Khanate of Kokand, the Kokand Beg outwardly appeared subservient to the Qing emperor, but secretly used the descendants of the Khoja to pressure the Qing court and Xinjiang officials, seeking privileges in southern Xinjiang. When necessary, he would directly send troops to help the Khoja descendants rebel. The Khoja descendants, in turn, relied on Kokand to strengthen their own power; for example, Jahangir Khoja promised to give Kashgar to Kokand.

After Jahangir's death, Kokand continued to use the descendants of the Khoja to invade Xinjiang, plundering the wealth of Kashgar, Yarkand, and other places, as seen in the Holy War of the Seven Khojas and the invasions of the Wali Khan. In 1864 on the eve of Kokand's demise at the hands of Russia, Yaqub Beg, a powerful minister of Kokand, along with Burzug, the son of Jahangir, invaded Xinjiang and established the Yettishar State. Later, Zuo Zongtang led troops to expel Yaqub Beg and recover Xinjiang. Burzug's whereabouts remain unknown, and Wali Khan was poisoned by Yaqub Beg. The descendants of the Khoja family thus exited the stage of history.

== Paintings ==
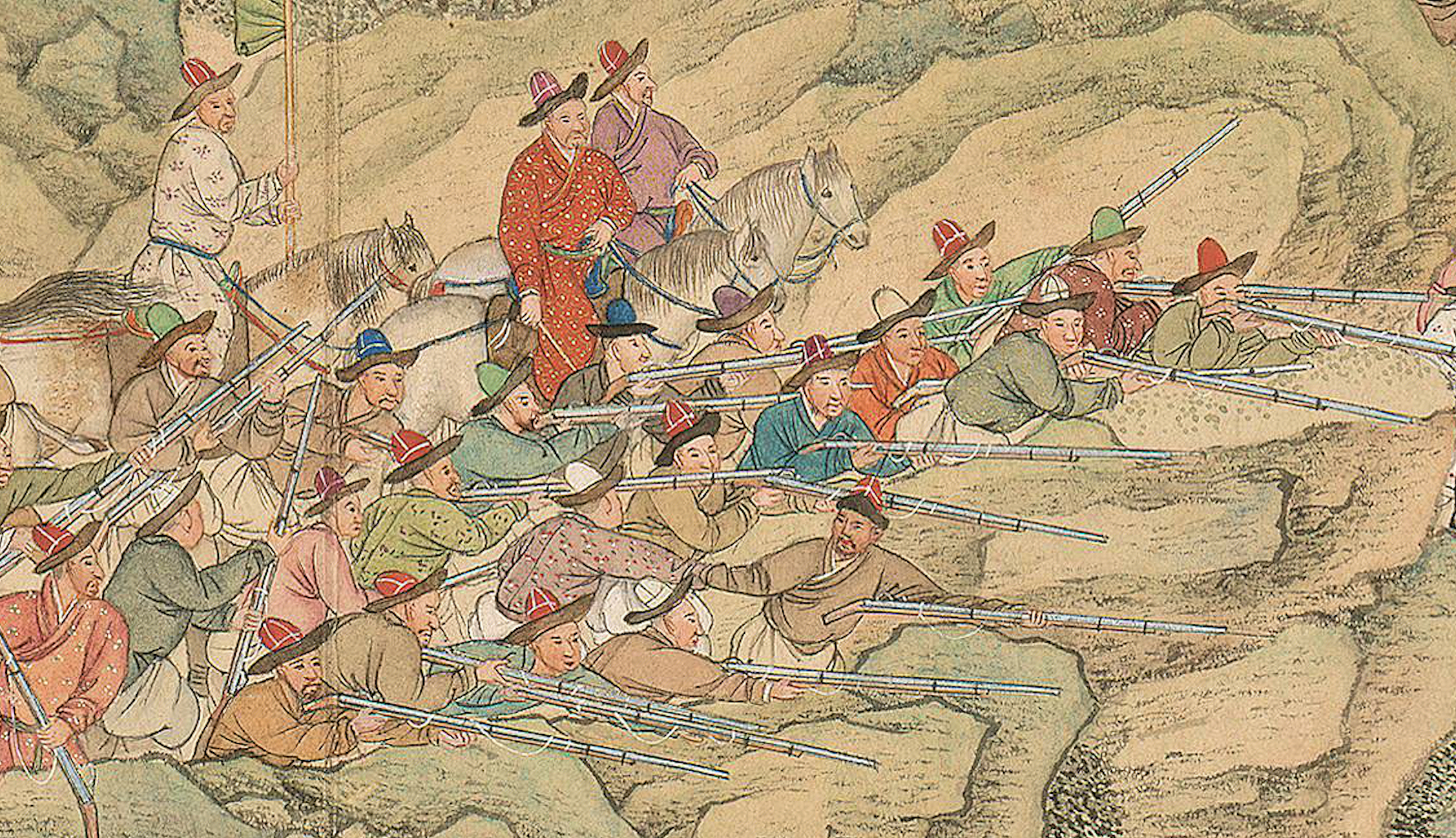
Khojas troops at the Battle of Yesil-kol-nor (1759). Painting by Jean-Damascène Sallusti.

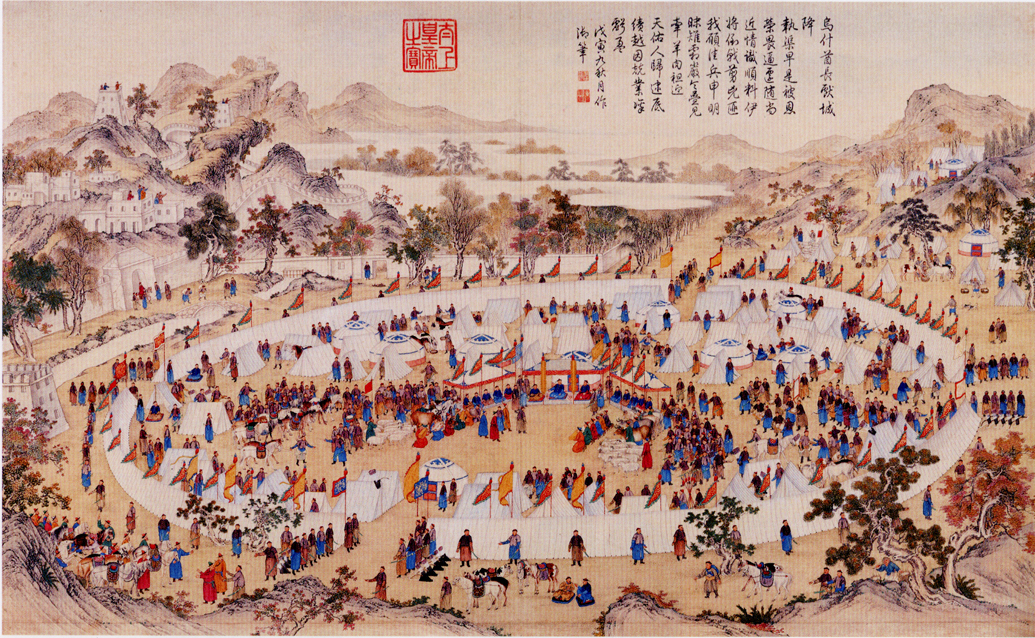
The surrender of the leader Khojis of Wushi (乌什, Us-Turfan in Uyghur) in 1758. By Jean-Damascène Sallusti.

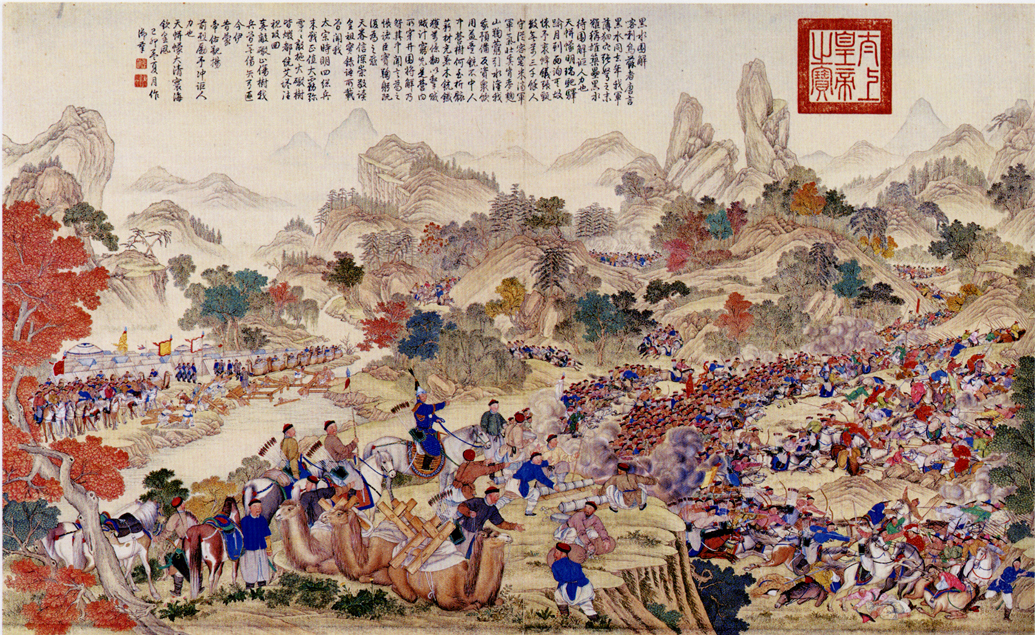
Zhao Hui was unable to take Yarkand, moved east but was forced to retreat by the rebels, who lay siege to him at the Black River. In 1759, Zhao Hui learnt of the imminent arrival of relief troops, and so stormed the rebel town and brought the rebellion to an end. By Giuseppe Castiglione.

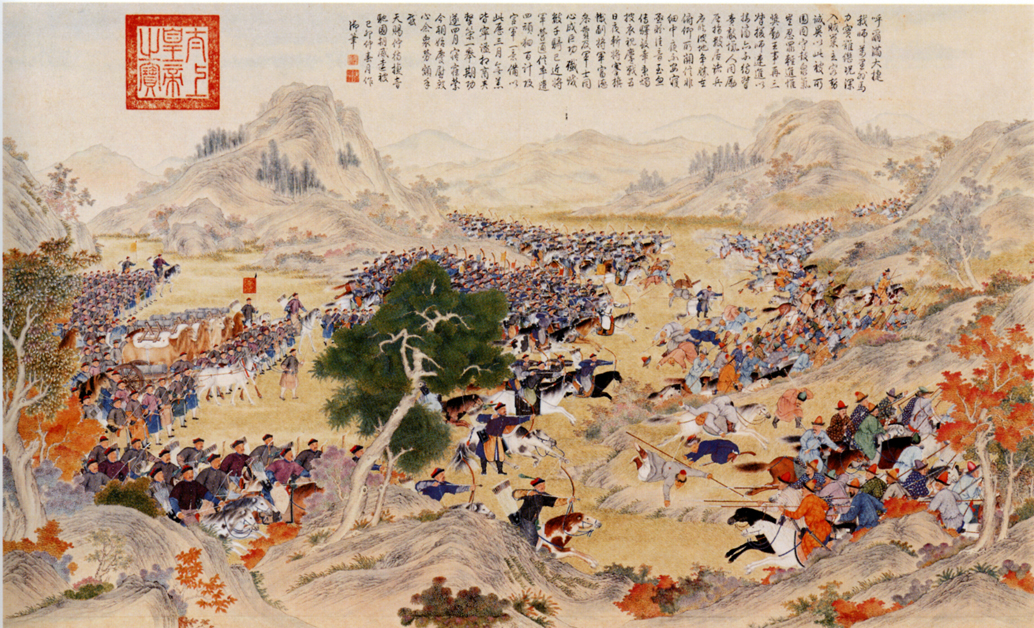
Battle of Qurman, 1759. General Fu De, on his way to relieve the siege of Khorgos, was suddenly attacked by an enemy force of 5,000 Muslim cavalry and with less than 600 men Fu De defeated the Muslims. By Jean-Damascène Sallusti.

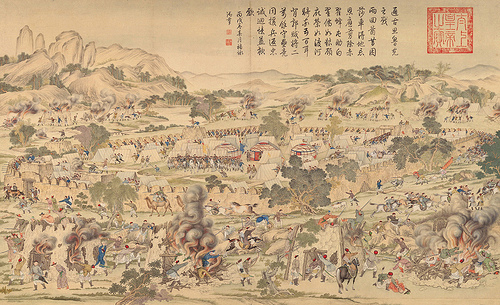
Battle of Tonguzluq, 1758. General Zhao Hui tries to take Yarkand but is defeated. By Giuseppe Castiglione.

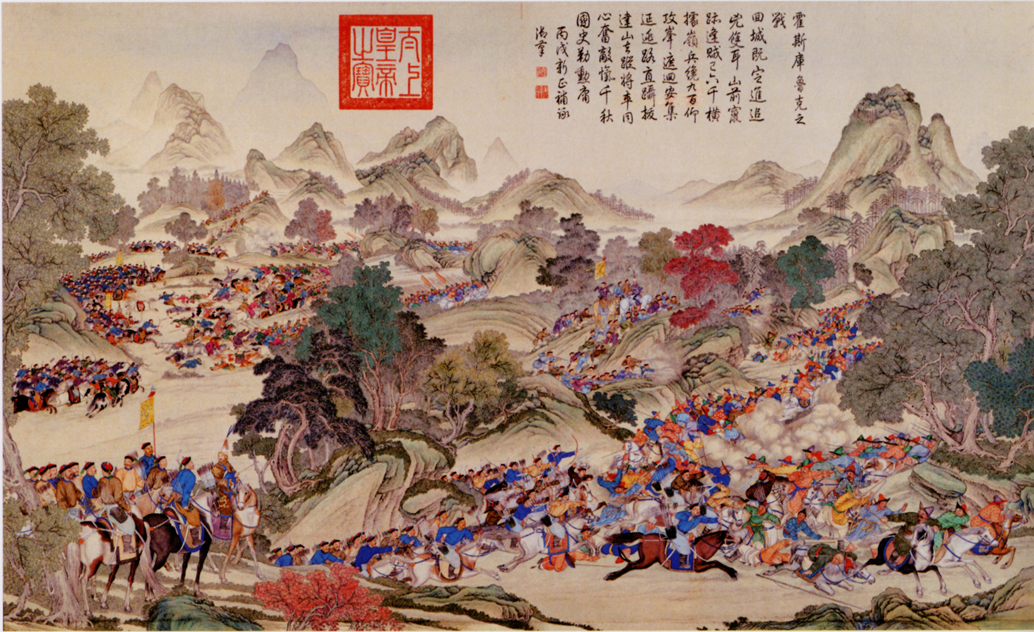
Battle of Qos-Qulaq, 1759. Chinese General Ming Rui defeats the Khoja army in Qos-Qulaq (north of Kara-Kul, Tajikistan). By Giuseppe Castiglione.

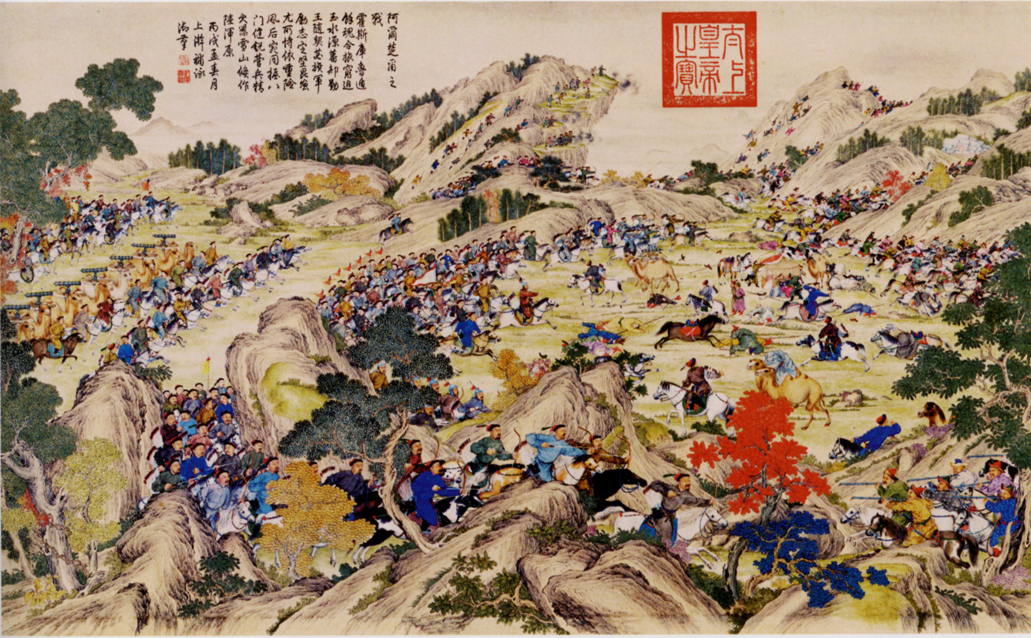
Qing defeat the Khoja at Arcul, after they had retreated following the battle of Qos-Qulaq, 1759. By Jean Denis Attiret.

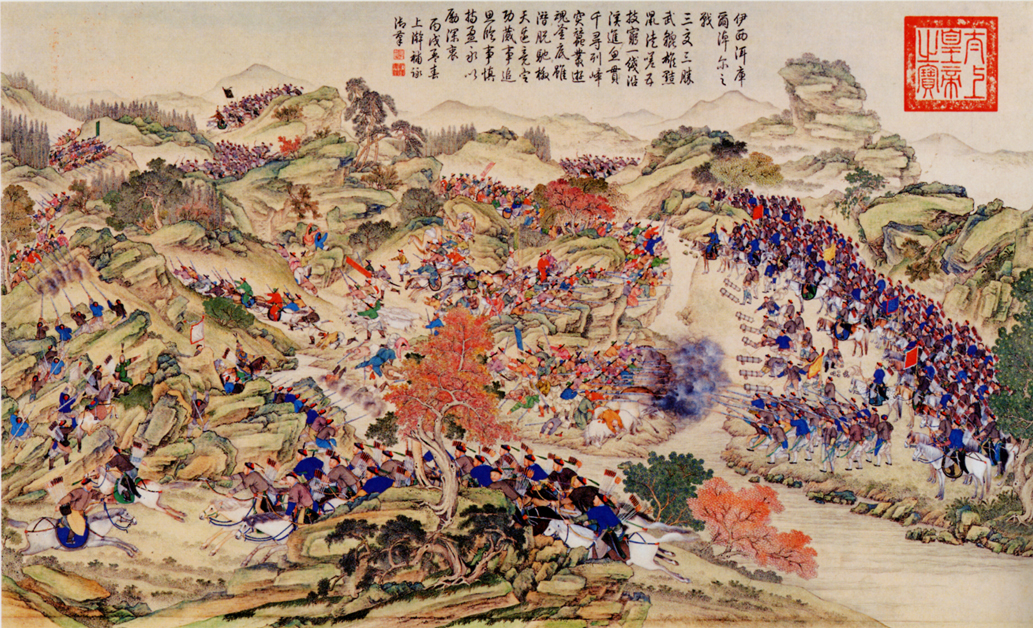
The Chinese army defeats the Khoja brothers (Burhān al-Dīn and Khwāja-i Jahān) in Yesil-Kol-Nor (present-day Yashil Kul, Tajikistan), 1759. By Jean-Damascène Sallusti.

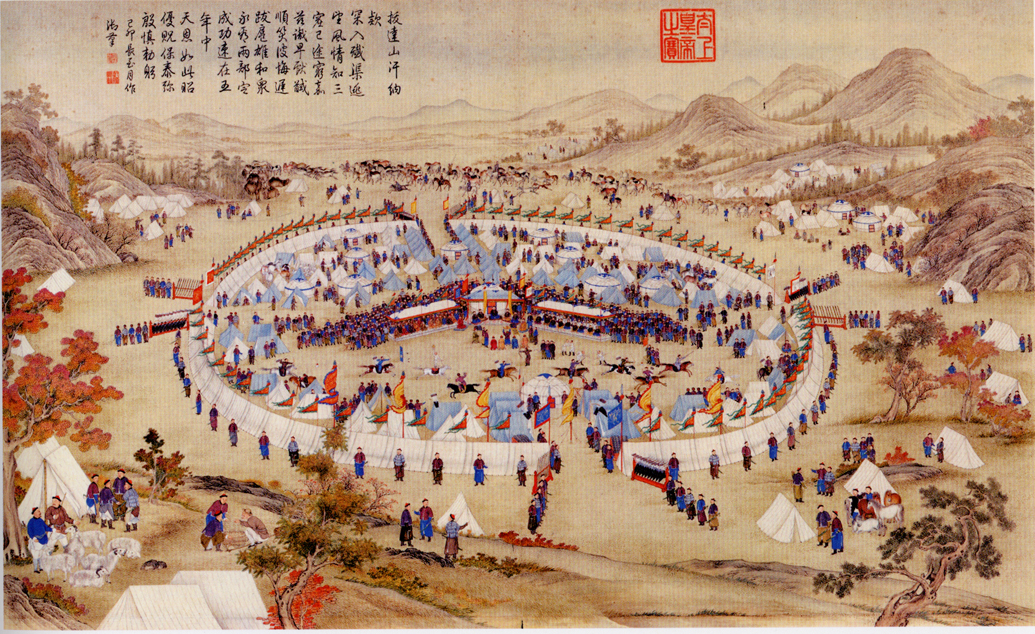
The Khan of Badakhsan asks to surrender, 1759. By Jean-Damascène Sallusti.

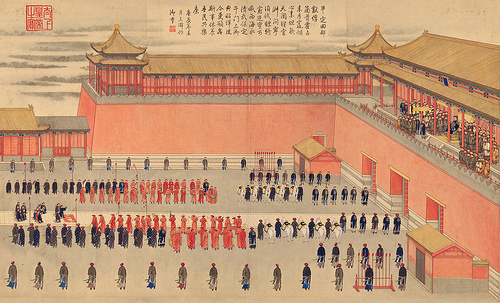
The prisoners are presented at the palace gate of Wumen. The emperor is also offered the head of the Khoja Huo Jizhan. By Jean-Denis Attiret.

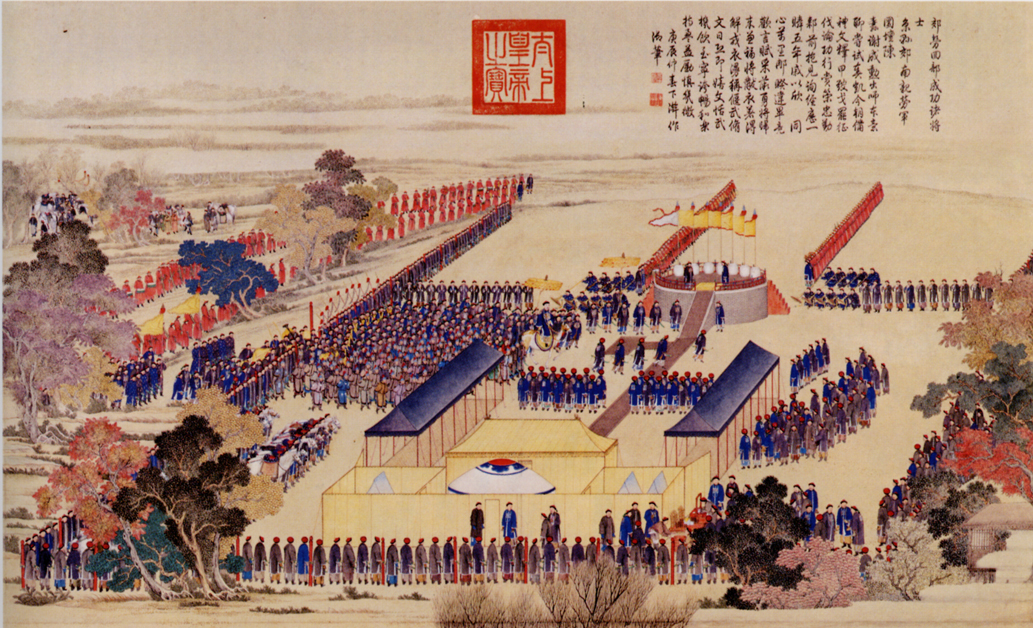
The emperor in the suburbs personally receives news of the officers and soldiers who distinguished themselves in the campaign against the Muslim tribes. By Jean-Damascène Sallusti.

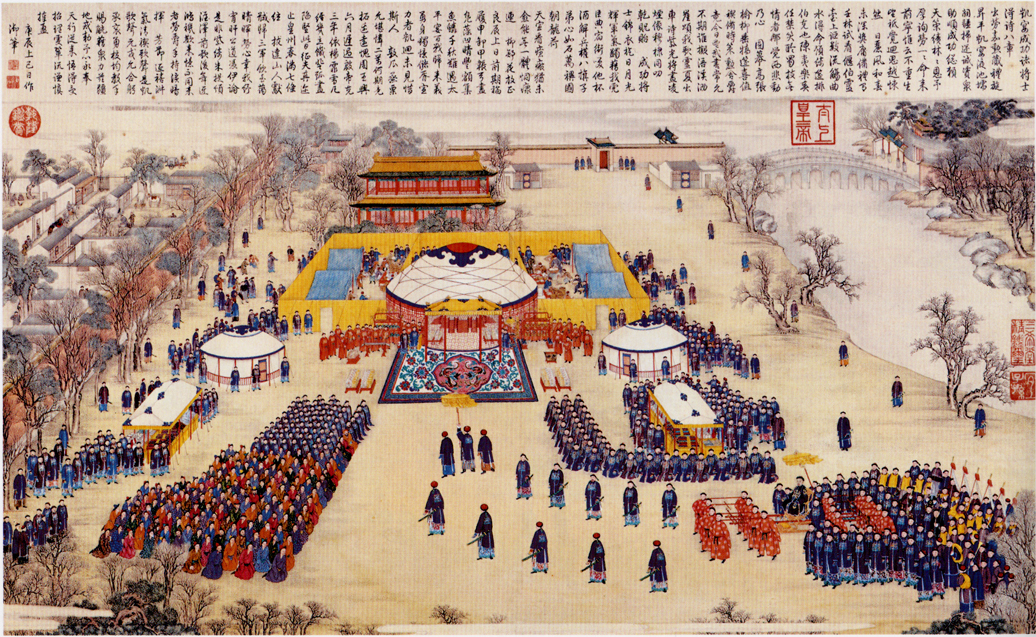
A victory banquet given by the emperor to the distinguished officers and soldiers of the Huibu Rebellion (1758–1759). By Giuseppe Castiglione.

== See also ==
- List of incidents of cannibalism

== Notes ==
1. Original Chinese: "我父縛來為質，至今並不將我等放回。我等情願帶領屬下三十餘戶投降大皇帝為臣僕"
2. During Qing dynasty, the government appointed a beg as the effective ruler of each town in the Muslim areas (Huibu; 回部) of Xinjiang.
3. Original Chinese: "料伊亦不敢遽爾妄行"
4. Original Chinese: "甫免為厄魯特（準噶爾）役使，今若投誠，又當納貢。不若自長一方，種地守城，足為捍禦。"
5. Original Chinese: "從前受辱於厄魯特，非大國（清）兵力，安能復歸故土？恩不可負，即兵力亦斷不能抗。"
6. Original Chinese: "我兄弟自祖父三世，俱被準噶爾囚禁。荷蒙天恩釋放，仍為回部頭目，受恩深重。若爾有負天朝，任爾自為，我必不能聽從"

== Bibliography ==
- Alikuzai, Hamid Wahed (2013). A Concise History of Afghanistan in 25 Volumes. Vol. 14. Trafford Publishing. ISBN 978-1-4907-1441-7.
- Dani, Ahmad Hasan; Masson, Vadim Mikhaĭlovich (2003). History of Civilizations of Central Asia: Development in contrast: from the sixteenth to the mid-nineteenth century. UNESCO. ISBN 978-92-3-103876-1.
- Hummel, Arthur W. Sr., ed. (1943). "Index" . Eminent Chinese of the Ch'ing Period. United States Government Printing Office.
- Perdue, Peter C (2009). China Marches West: The Qing Conquest of Central Eurasia. Harvard University Press. ISBN 978-0-674-04202-5.
- Liu, Zhengyin; Wei, Liangtao (1998). 《西域和卓家族研究》 [Research Paper on the Khoja Clan of the Western Regions] (in Chinese). 中国社会科学出版社 (China Social Sciences Publishing). ISBN 978-7500423782.
