= Khojis =

Uyghur Emir (died 1781)

Khojis خوجىس
- Prince Aksu of the Second Rank hākim beg
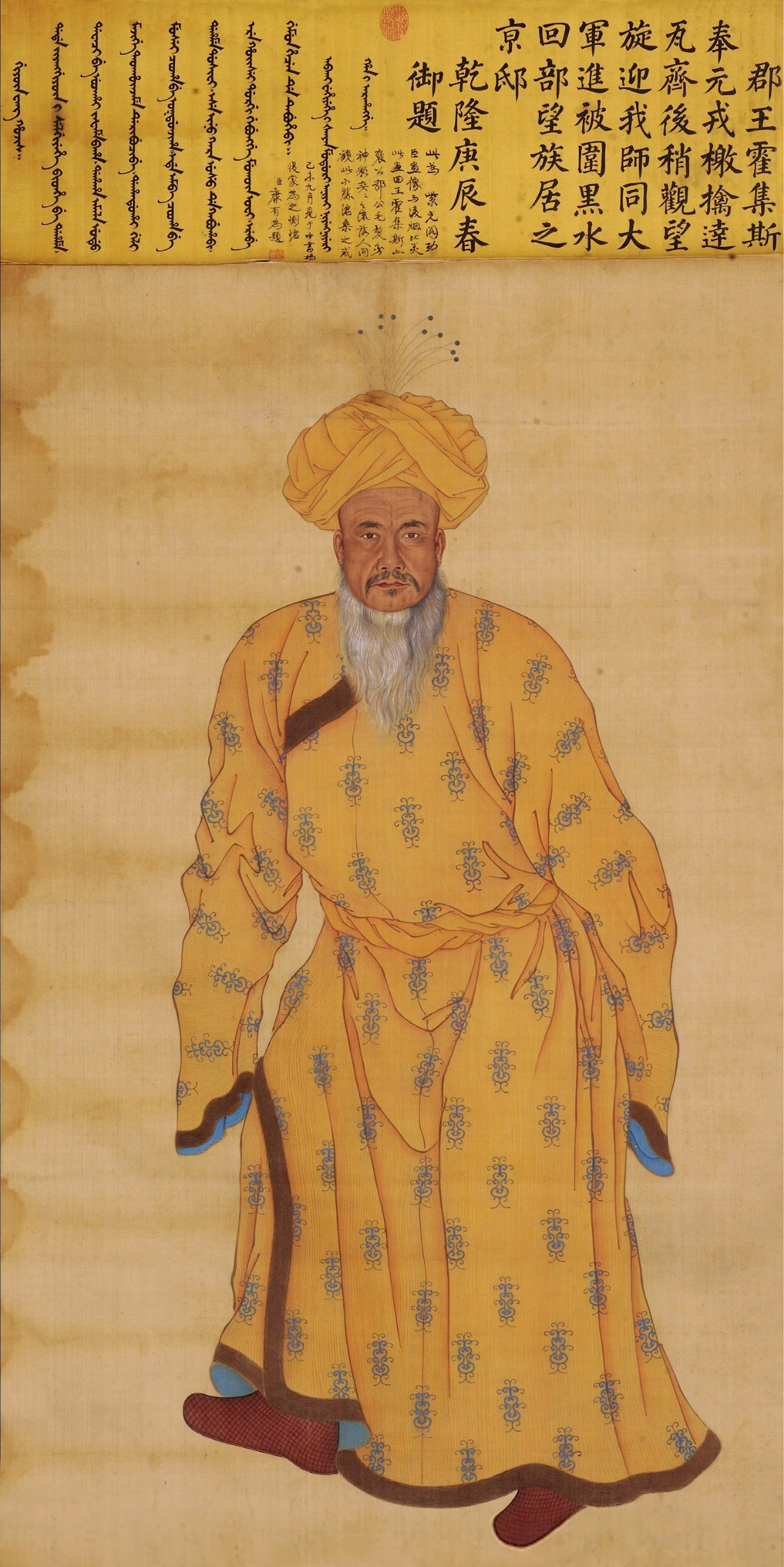
- Uyghur General Khojis (-1781), governor of Us-Turfan, who later settled in Beijing. Painting by Ignatius Sichelbart, a European Jesuit artist at the Chinese court in 1775.

Prince Aksu of the Second Rank
- Tenure: 1759–1781
- Predecessor: new position
- Successor: Hadil
- Born: Unknown; Uqturpan
- Died: 1781; Beijing
- Father: Aziz Hoja

Khojis (Uyghur: خوجىس, Manchu: ᡥᠣᠵᡳ᠍ᠰ, Chinese: 霍集斯; pinyin: Huòjísī, died 1781) was a Muslim Uyghur Emir, or hākim beg, of Uqturpan (also Us-Turfan, Chinese: 烏什, Wushi) in Xinjiang during the 18th century.

Khojis collaborated with Qing forces in the 1755-1757 Dzungar–Qing War, when he captured the Dzungar Khanate leader Dawachi as he fled into the mountains north of Aksu, and delivered him to the Qing.

Khojis again collaborated with the Qing in the Amursana rebellion (1757–1759) and in the suppression of the Muslim Revolt of the Altishahr Khojas (1757–1759). Khojis appears in a famous Qing Dynasty Illustrated Campaign for the Pacification of the Ili Muslim Rebellion: The Chieftain of Uqturpan Surrenders the City (平定伊犁回部戰圖冊·烏什酋長獻城降), arranging the surrender of the city of Uqturpan to Chinese Qing forces in 1758.

The Qianlong Emperor of the Qing rewarded Khojis with the title of Qinwang (亲王, "Prince"), and settled him in Beijing.

== Gallery ==
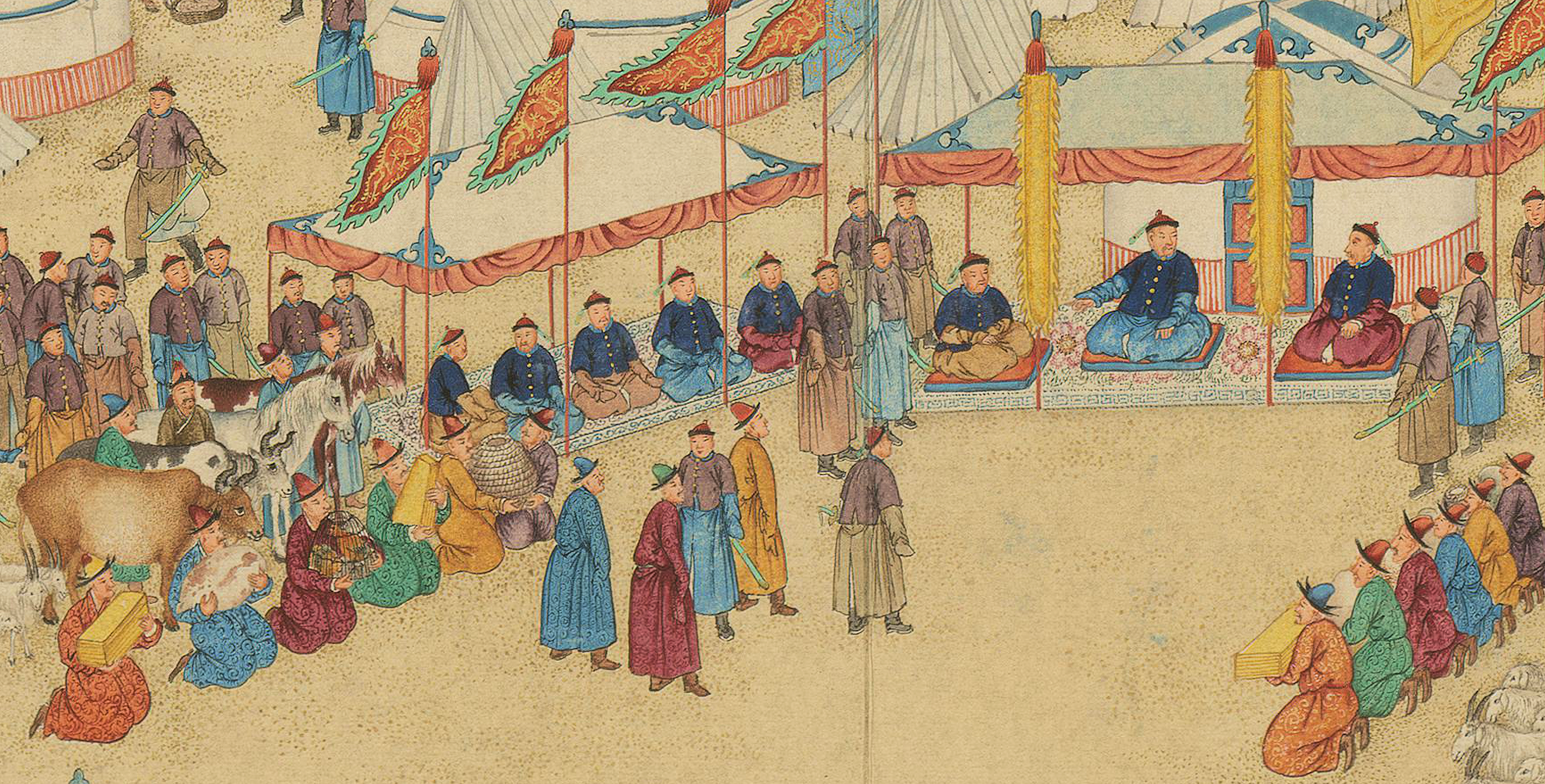
Muslim Emir Khojis arranges the surrender of Uqturpan to Qing forces in 1758 (detail)

The Emir of Uqturpan surrendering the city of Uqturpan during the suppression of the Muslim Revolt of the Altishahr Khojas. (平定伊犁回部戰圖冊·烏什酋長獻城降, 1764).

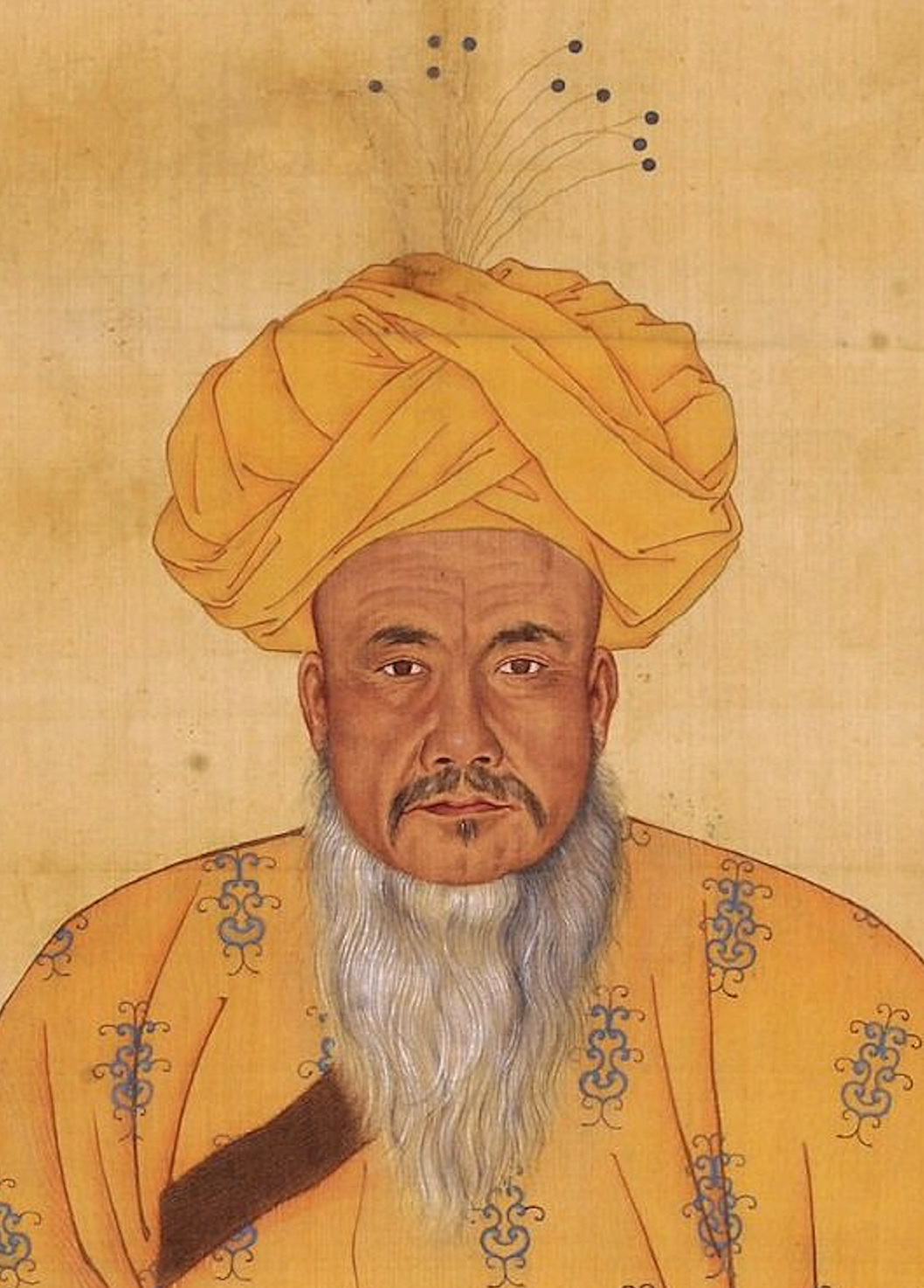
Portrait (detail, 1775), by Ignatius Sichelbart

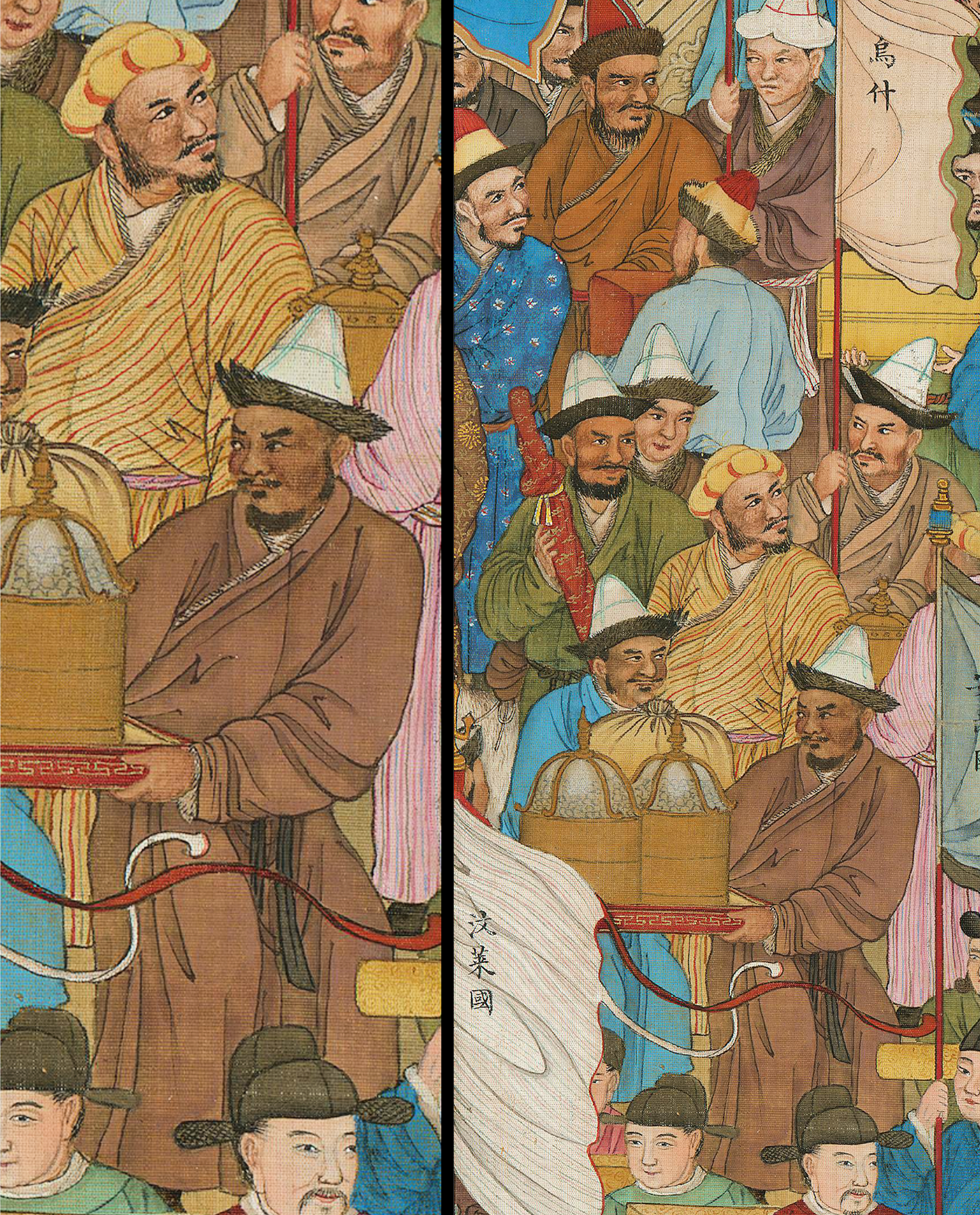
Uqturpan delegates (bottom group, flag "烏什") in Peking in 1761. Ten Thousand Nations Coming to Pay Tribute (萬國來朝圖)

== Sources ==
- Adle, Chahryar (2003). History of Civilizations of Central Asia 5.
- Schorkowitz, Dittmar (14 November 2016). Managing Frontiers in Qing China: The Lifanyuan and Libu Revisited. BRILL. ISBN 978-90-04-33500-4.
