= Jean-Damascène Sallusti =

- Died: 1781
- Other name: An Deyi
- Occupations: Bishop of Beijing, Missionary to China, court painter under the Qianlong Emperor
- Works: "Battle Copper Prints", commemorating the I-li campaign

Jean-Damascène Sallusti, also Giovanni Damasceno (simplified Chinese: 安德义; traditional Chinese: 安德義; pinyin: Ān Déyì; d. 1781) was an Italian missionary to China, as well as a court painter under the Qianlong Emperor of the Qing dynasty.

A member of the Augustinian order, and later a Jesuit, Sallusti was (somewhat controversially) appointed Bishop of Beijing in 1778, a position he held until his death in 1781. As a painter, he was a contemporary of Giuseppe Castiglione and Ignatius Sichelbart, and with them was responsible for the creation of the Emperor's "Battle Copper Prints", commemorating the I-li campaign. Work by Sallusti is held in the collection of the Cleveland Museum of Art.

Battle of Kurungui

Battle of Yesil-kol-nor

The Chief of Us-Turfan Surrendering his City

The Emperor Greeting The Triumphant Troops Outside of the Capital

The Great Victory at Qurman

The Surrender of the Khan of Badakhsan
