= Emin Khoja =

- Prince of Turpan of the Second Rank 吐魯番回部札薩克多羅郡王
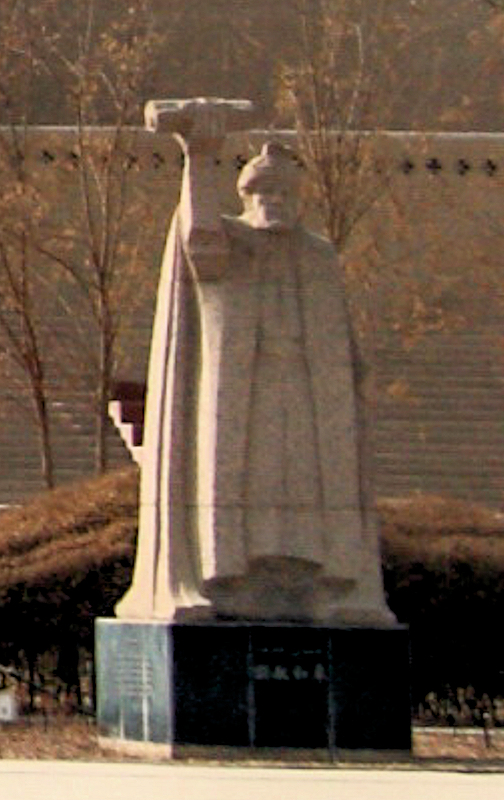
- Statue of Emin Khoja, next to the Turfan Emin Minaret

Prince of Turpan
- Reign: 1733–1777
- Predecessor: new peerage
- Successor: Suleiman
- Born: c. 1694
- Died: 1777 (aged 82–83)
Names
- Emin Khoja
- Father: Niyas Khoja

Emin Khoja (Uyghur: ئىمىن خوجا, Chinese: 額敏和卓), alternatively rendered as Amīn Khoja and Emin Khwaja, was an Uighur leader from Turpan who revolted against the Dzungar Khanate in 1720, while the Dzungars under Tsewang Rabtan were being attacked by the Qing dynasty in the Dzungar–Qing Wars. Emin Khoja submitted to the Qing dynasty. Uighur Muslims like Emin Khoja from Turfan revolted against their Dzungar Buddhist rulers and pledged allegiance to the Qing dynasty to deliver them from Dzungar Buddhist rule. The Qing eventually eliminated the Dzungars in the Dzungar genocide. Emin Khoja was "arguably the most prominent Muslim collaborator in the Qing imperial expansion into Central Asia".

Emin Khoja collaborated with the Qing dynasty against the Dzungars from 1755, contributing 300 soldiers to the Qing campaign against the Dzungars in the Ili region.

Emin Khoja also allied with the Qing to crush the Revolt of the Altishahr Khojas led by Burhan-ud-din and Khan Khoja, and drove them to Badakhshan. The Qing armies reached far into Central Asia and came to the outskirts of Tashkent while the Kazakh rulers made their submissions as vassals to the Qing dynasty.

Emin Khoja received the official Chinese noble title of Fuguo gong (輔國公, "Duke Who Assists the State"). He was left as semi-autonomous ruler of Turpan and later appointed as ruler of Yarkand in the newly created province of Nan-lu (Southern Road) in 1760.

The Emin Minaret was built by his son and successor Suleiman in 1777 in the memory of his father. It is the tallest minaret in China.

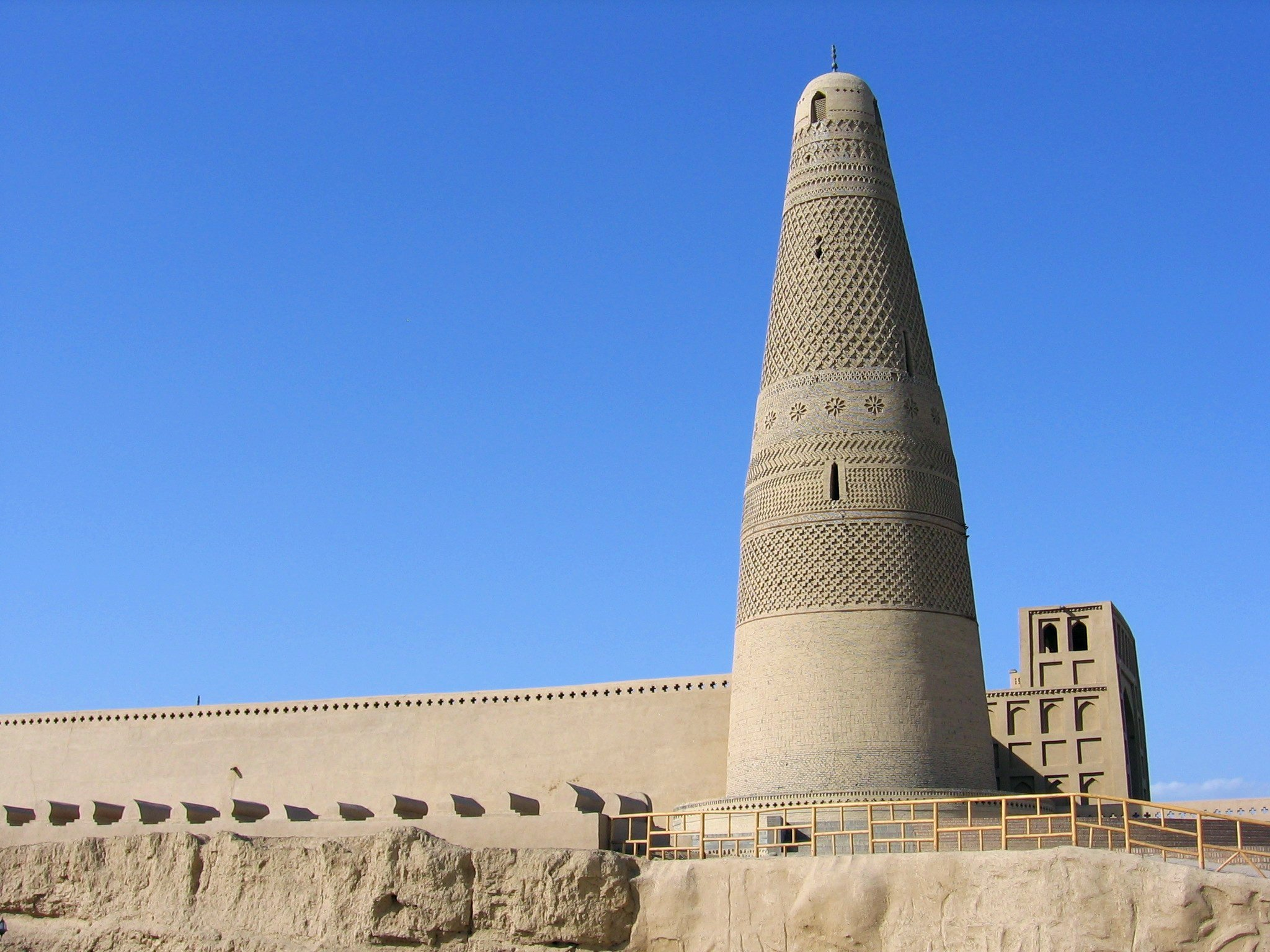
Minaret of Turpan ruler Emin Khoja, built by his son and successor Suleiman in 1777 in the memory of his father (tallest minaret in China)

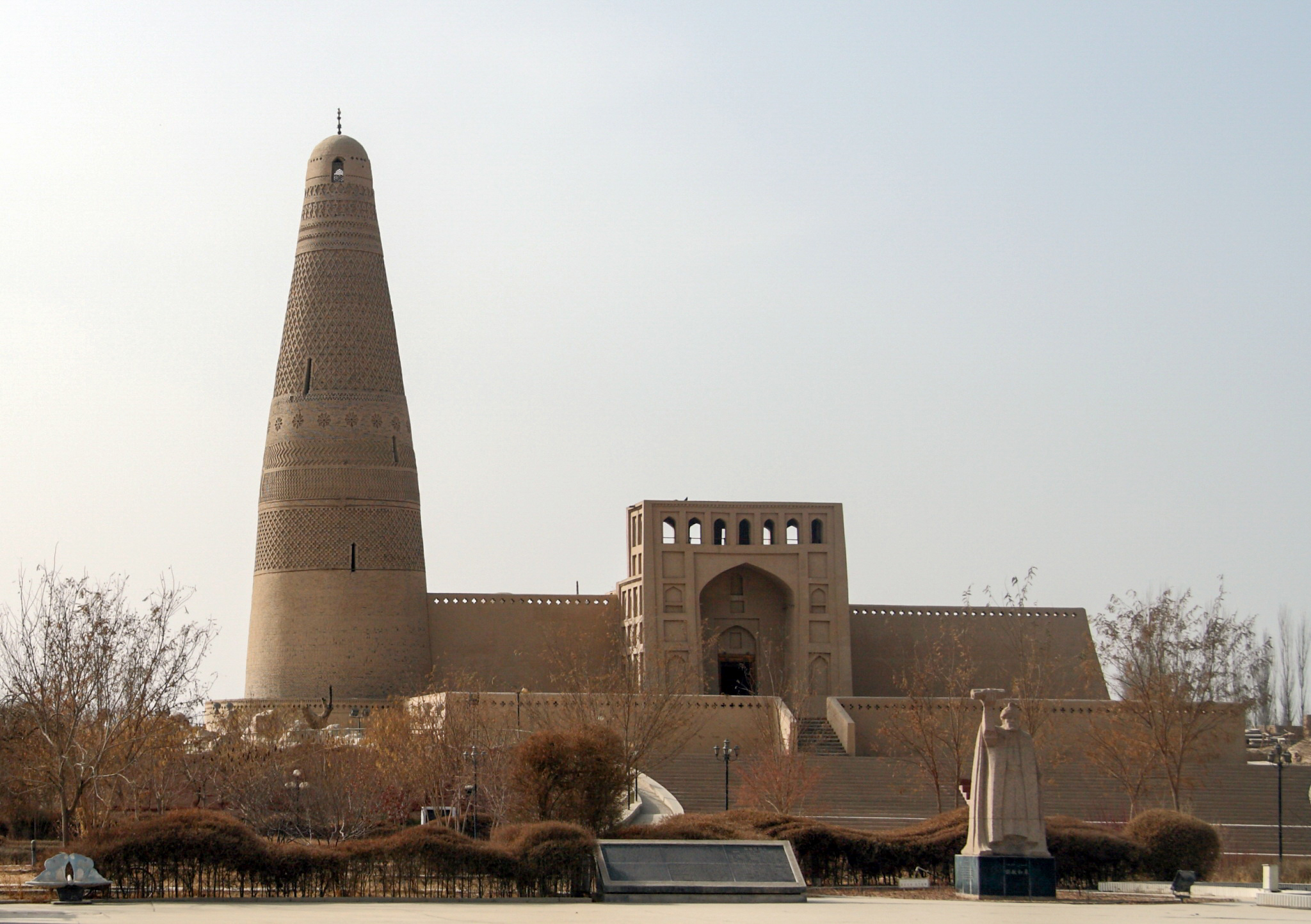
Emin Minaret

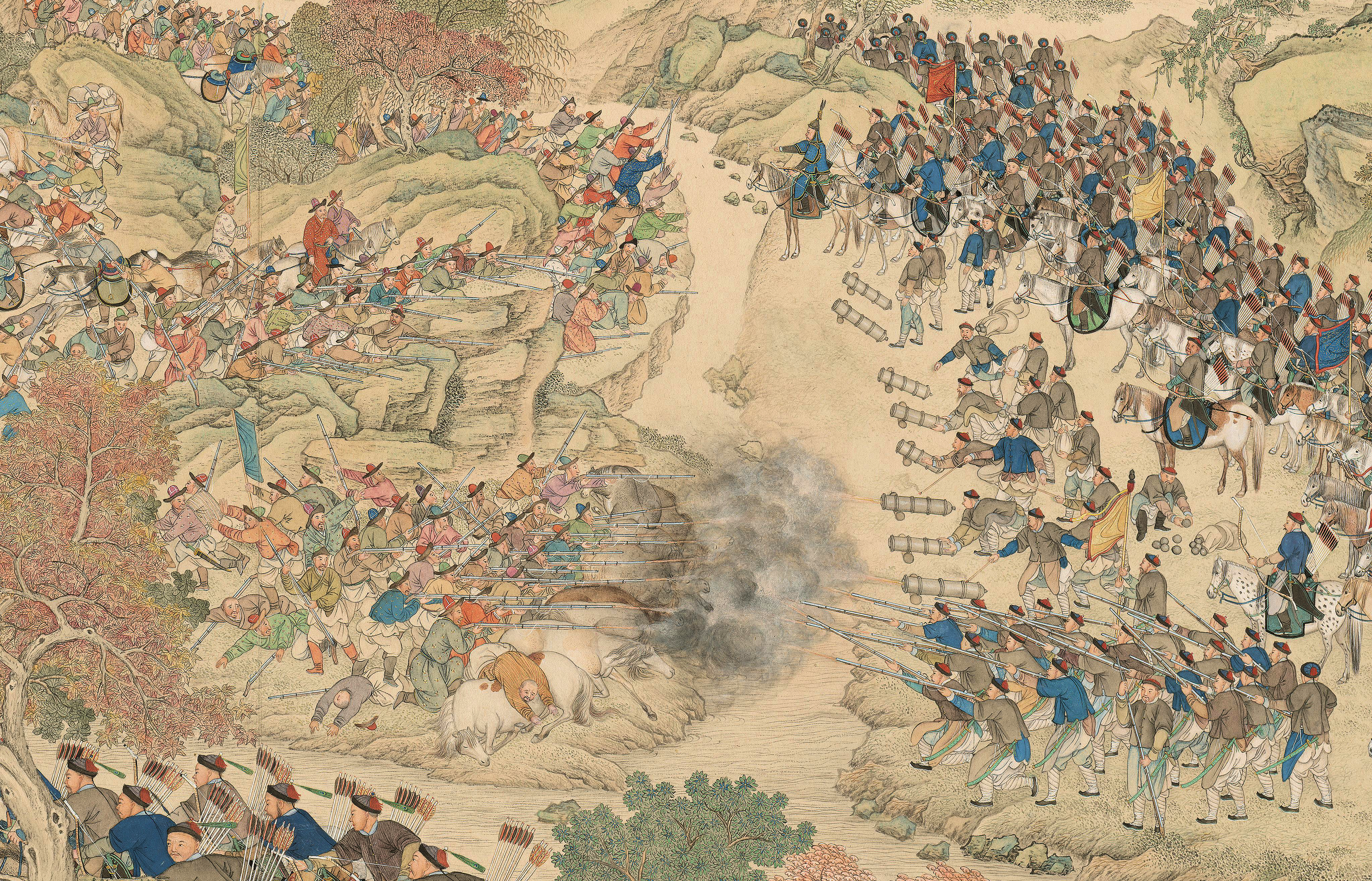
Emin Khoja fought alongside the Qing (right) in the repression of the Revolt of the Altishahr Khojas
