= Ignatius Sichelbart =

German painter

The Submission of the Ili drawn by Ignatius Sichelbart, 1764

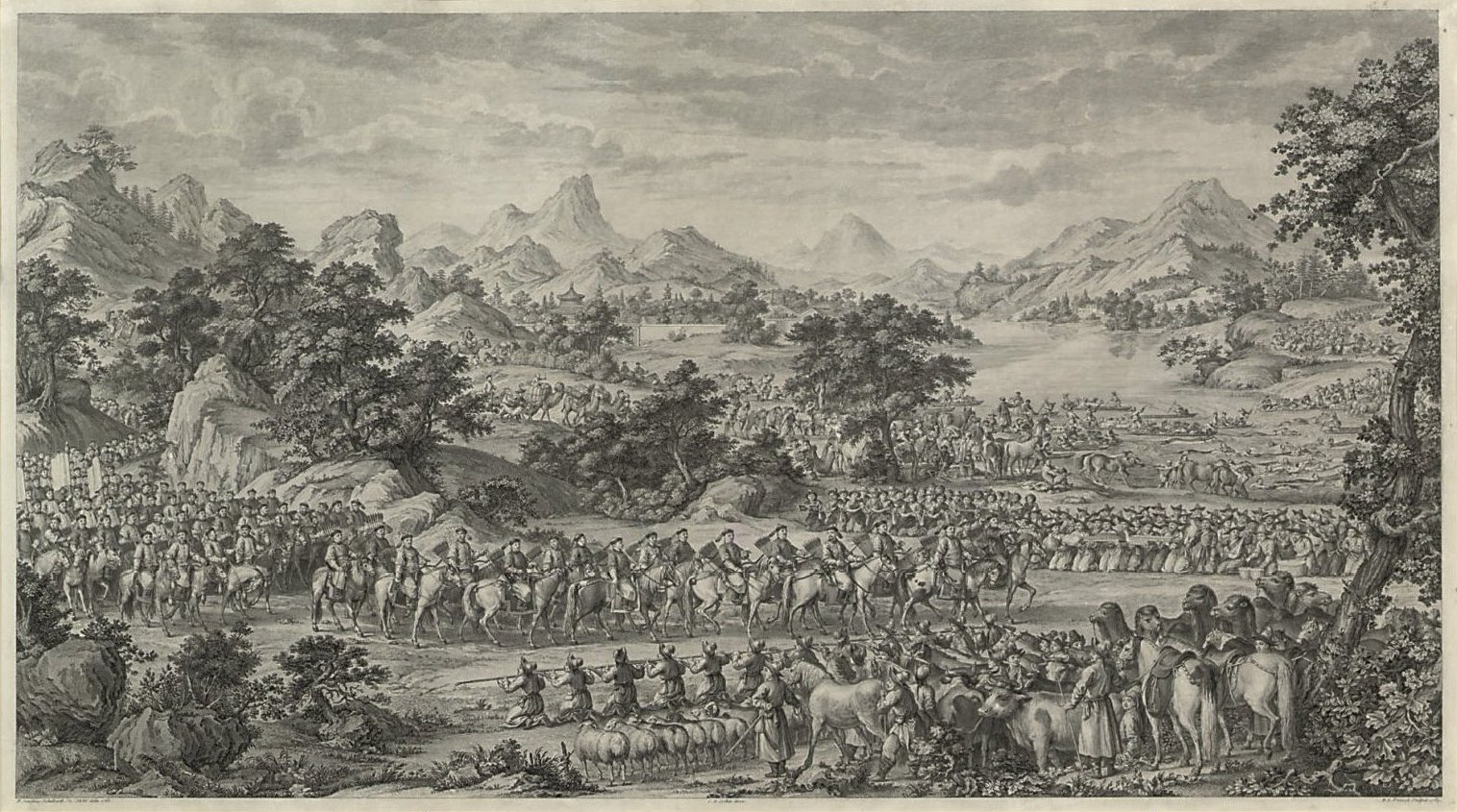
The Submission of the Ili engraved by Benoît-Louis Prévost, 1769, after the painting by Ignatius Sichelbart

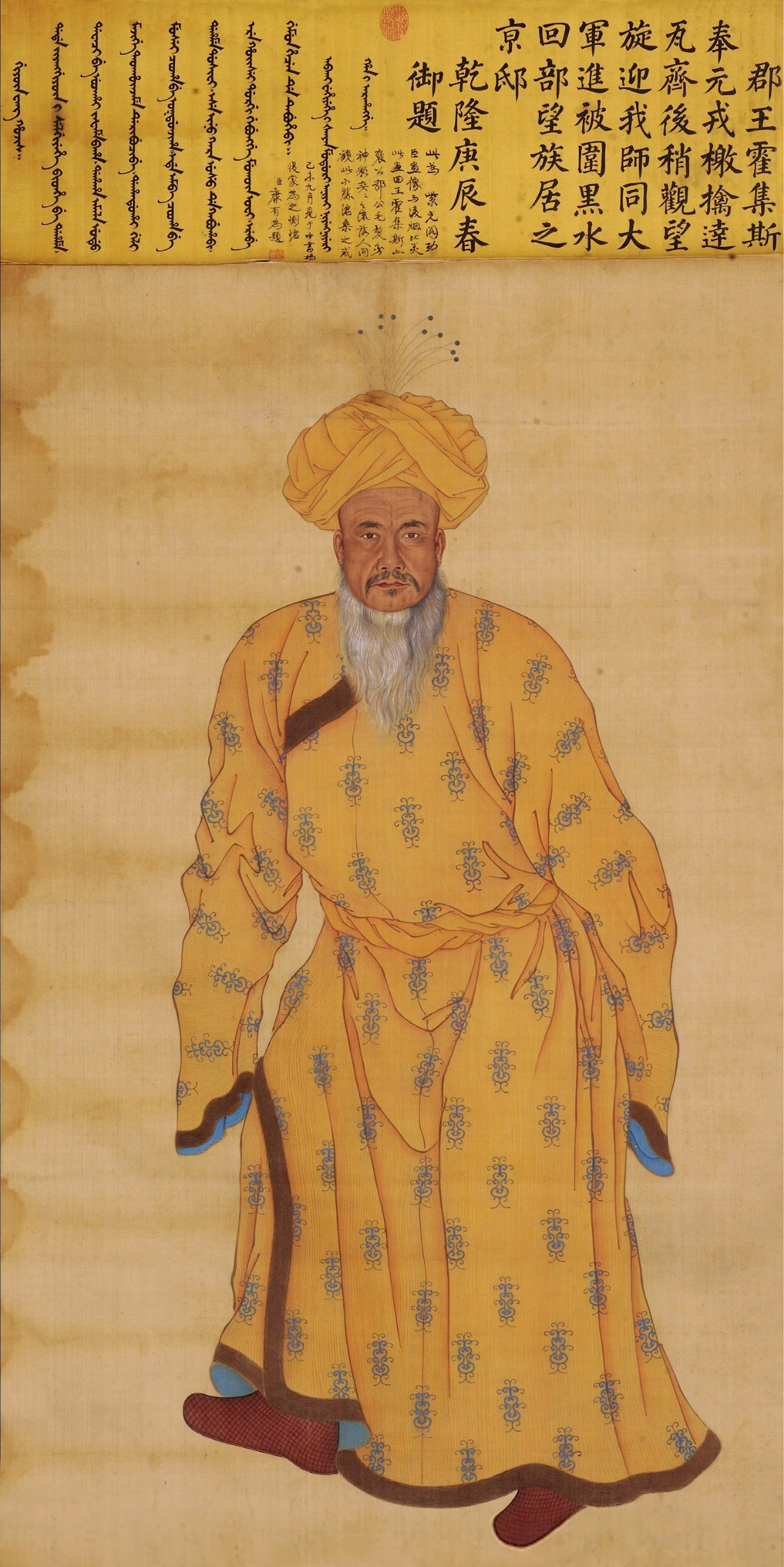
Uyghur General Khojis (–1781), governor of Us-Turfan, who later settled in Beijing. Painting by a European Jesuit artist Ignatius Sichelbart at the Chinese court in 1775.

Ignatius Sichelbart also Sickelbart, Sickelpart; Chinese 艾啟蒙 / 艾启蒙 Ài Qǐměng or Ai Ch'i-meng; (September 26, 1708 Nejdek – October 6, 1780 Beijing), was a German-Bohemian Jesuit missionary and painter.

After his novitiate in Brno and the study of theology in Olomouc, Sichelbart was assigned as the missionary to China's Provincial Government in 1745. He was joined on the mission by two other painters Giuseppe Castiglione and Jean Denis Attiret. Together while in China, the artists combined their European techniques with traditional Chinese painting to create new styles.

After successful military campaigns known as the Ten Great Campaigns in Central Asia, the Qianlong Emperor commissioned depictions of the battles. The work was carried out by the Jesuit artists, among them Sichelbart. The group produced 16 tableaux, which were engraved in France in 1774. As a reward for his service and work, he was promoted to director of the Imperial Painting Academy and court painter to the Emperor. Sichelbart died in Beijing in 1780. He was buried in the Jesuits' Zhalan Cemetery.
