= Hakim Beg =

Coordinates: 31°54′N 74°56′E

- Village
- Interactive map of Hakim Beg
- Country: India
- State: Punjab
- District: Gurdaspur
- Tehsil: Dera Baba Nanak
- Region: Majha

Government
  - Type: Panchayat raj
  - Body: Gram panchayat

Area
  - Total: 79 ha (200 acres)

Population (2011)
  - Total: 361; 188/173 ♂/♀
  - Scheduled Castes: 123; 59/64 ♂/♀
  - Total Households: 66

Languages
  - Official: Punjabi
- Time zone: UTC+5:30 (IST)
- Telephone: 01871
- ISO 3166 code: IN-PB
- Website: gurdaspur.nic.in

Hakim Beg is a village in Dera Baba Nanak in Gurdaspur district of Punjab State, India. It is located 25 kilometres (16 mi) from sub district headquarter and 65 kilometres (40 mi) from district headquarter. The village is administrated by Sarpanch an elected representative of the village.

== Demography ==
As of 2011, the village has a total number of 66 houses and a population of 361 of which 188 are males while 173 are females. According to the report published by Census India in 2011, out of the total population of the village 123 people are from Schedule Caste and the village does not have any Schedule Tribe population so far.

== See also ==
- List of villages in India
