= Arigūn =

First Class Duke Guoyi Arigūn
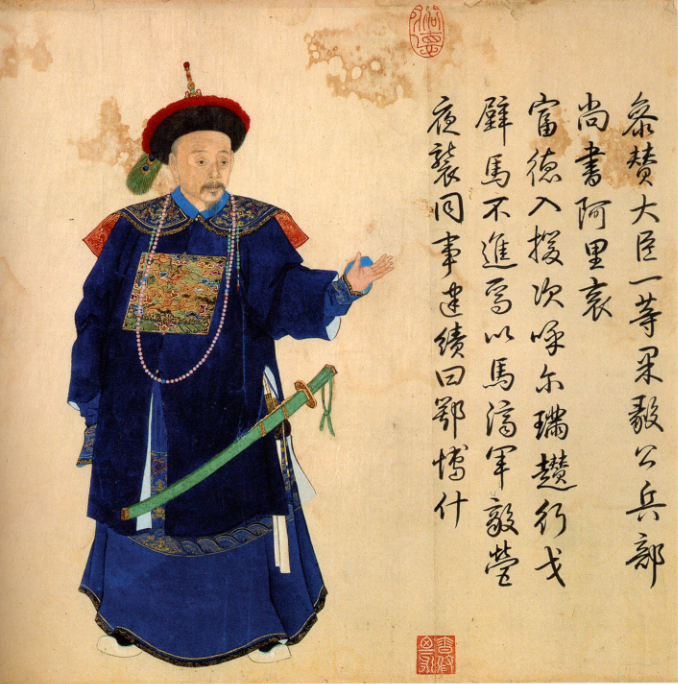

Grand Councillor
- In office 28 August 1761 – 1768
- In office 12 May 1756 – 20 June 1756

Assistant Grand Secretary
- In office 12 December 1764 – 6 December 1769

Minister of Revenue
- In office 12 December 1764 – 4 December 1769
- Preceded by: Zhaohui
- Succeeded by: Guanbao
- In office 7 November 1755 – 1 April 1757
- Preceded by: Haiwang
- Succeeded by: Zhaohui

Minister of War
- In office 4 January 1759 – 12 December 1764
- Preceded by: Dulai
- Succeeded by: Tondo

Viceroy of Liangguang
- In office 14 November 1751 – 24 February 1753
- Preceded by: Chen Dashou
- Succeeded by: Bandi

Viceroy of Huguang
- In office 24 May 1750 – 14 November 1751
- Preceded by: Yongxing
- Succeeded by: Yongchang

Governor of Shanxi
- In office 3 September 1748 – 24 May 1750
- Preceded by: Zhuntai
- Succeeded by: Asha
- In office 11 October 1743 – 2 October 1746
- Preceded by: Liu Yuyi
- Succeeded by: Bandi

Governor of Shandong
- In office 2 October 1746 – 3 September 1748
- Preceded by: Selengge
- Succeeded by: Zhuntai

Personal details
- Born: 1712
- Died: 6 December 1769 (aged 56–57) Kingdom of Burma
- Relations: Ebilun (grandfather), Alingga (uncle), Empress Xiaozhaoren (aunt), Noble Consort Wenxi (aunt), Ts'ereng (elder brother), Necin (elder brother), Fengšengge (son), Yonglin (son-in-law), Empress Xiaomucheng (granddaughter)
- Parent: Yende (father)
- Occupation: politician, general
- Clan name: Niohuru
- Courtesy name: Songya (松崖)
- Art name: Yunyan (雲巖)
- Posthumous name: Xiangzhuang (襄壯)

Military service
- Allegiance: Qing dynasty
- Branch/service: Manchu Plain Yellow Banner
- Battles/wars: Amursana rebellion Revolt of the Altishahr Khojas; Sino-Burmese War

Arigūn (Manchu: ᠠᡵᡳᡤᡡᠨ, Chinese: 阿里袞, 1712 – 6 December 1769), courtesy name Songya (松崖), was a Qing dynasty official and general from the Manchu Niohuru clan and the Plain Yellow Banner of the Eight Banners.

Arigūn was the fourth son of Yende. He was also a younger brother of Necin. In 1737, he was promoted from a second rank imperial guard (二等侍衛) to the Minister for the Chancery of the Imperial Household Department (總管內務府大臣). Later, he had served as the Junior Vice Minister of War (兵部右侍郎), Junior Vice Minister of Revenue (戶部右侍郎), Governor of Shanxi, Governor of Shandong and other positions. He was appointed the Viceroy of Huguang in 1750, and transferred to Liangguang in the next year. In 1753 his mother died, he resigned and went home to perform filial mourning. Three years later, just after the mourning period, he returned to serve as the Junior Vice Minister of Revenue. He was promoted to the Minister of Revenue in 1755 then transferred to the Minister of War in 1757. He had participated in putting down the Revolt of the Altishahr Khojas, thus his portrait was painted in the Hall of Military Merits, known as Ziguangge (紫光閣).

In 1768, after the defeat of Maymyo, Arigun and Agui were appointed assistant commanders (副將軍) to attack Burma, accompanied with Fuheng. On the way he became seriously ill as his body became suppurated. Fuheng asked him to stay in Yongchang-fu (永昌府, present-day Baoshan, Yunnan) to take a rest, but he refused. In the next year he took part in a fierce battle despite being ill, took the lead, and died of wound.

== Family ==
- Father: Yende (尹德)
- Brothers:
  - Ts'ereng (策楞)
  - Necin (訥親)
  - Aminertu (阿敏爾圖)
  - Aibida (愛必達)
- Spouse: Lady Gūwalgiya
- Sons:
  - Fengšengge (豐昇額), Minister of War (1774–1776), Minister of Revenue (1776–1777)
  - Wesingge (倭盛額 or 倭興額)
  - Sekjingge (色克精額)
  - Buyandalai (布彥達賚), father of Empress Xiaomucheng
