= List of people from Quetta =

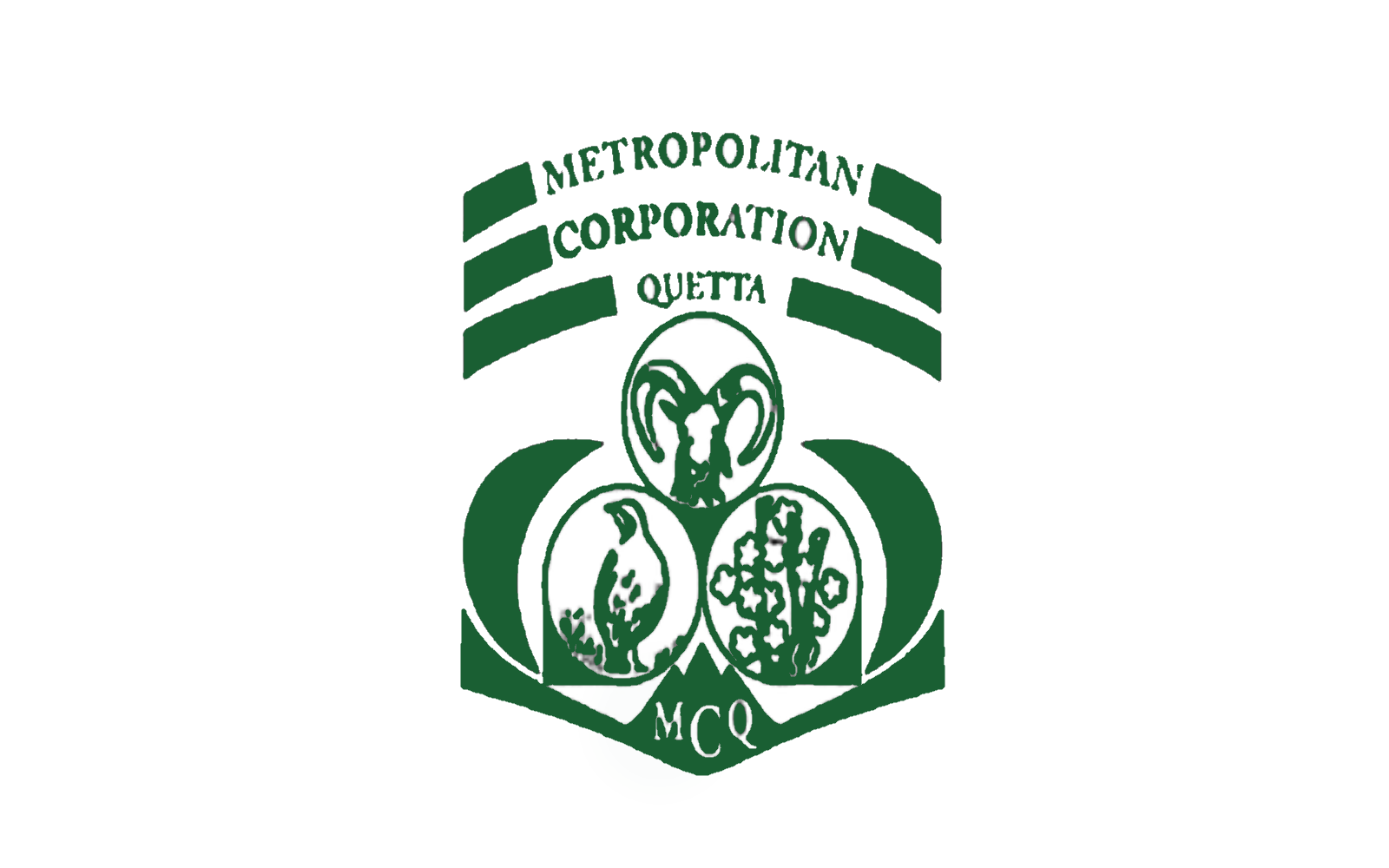
Quetta City Flag

This is the list of notable people who were born, lived or grew up in Quetta (the provincial capital of Balochistan province of Pakistan) and Quetta District. List is ordered by the professions of people.

== Civil and military officers ==
- Abdul Qadir Baloch
- Yazdan Khan
- Musa Khan
- Chris Keeble
- George Philip Bradley Roberts
- Ian Jacob
- Gul Hassan Khan
- James Cassels
- Patrick Hore-Ruthven
- Sharbat Ali Changezi

== Film, radio and television people ==
- Abid Ali
- Abid Ali Nazish
- Avice Landone
- Ayub Khoso Actor
- Hameed Sheikh Actor
- Jamal Shah Actor
- Merle Tottenham
- Neil North
- Suresh Oberoi
- Veena
- Zeba Bakhtiar

== Journalists, poets and writers ==
- Agha Sadiq
- Ali Baba Taj
- Alison Plowden
- Mohsin Changezi
- Muneer Ahmed Badini
- Russi Karanjia
- Siddiq Baloch
- Wajahat Saeed Khan
- Zafar Mairaj

== Musicians ==
- Dawood Sarkhosh
- Faiz Mohammad Faizok
- Rabi Peerzada

== Politicians and lawyers ==
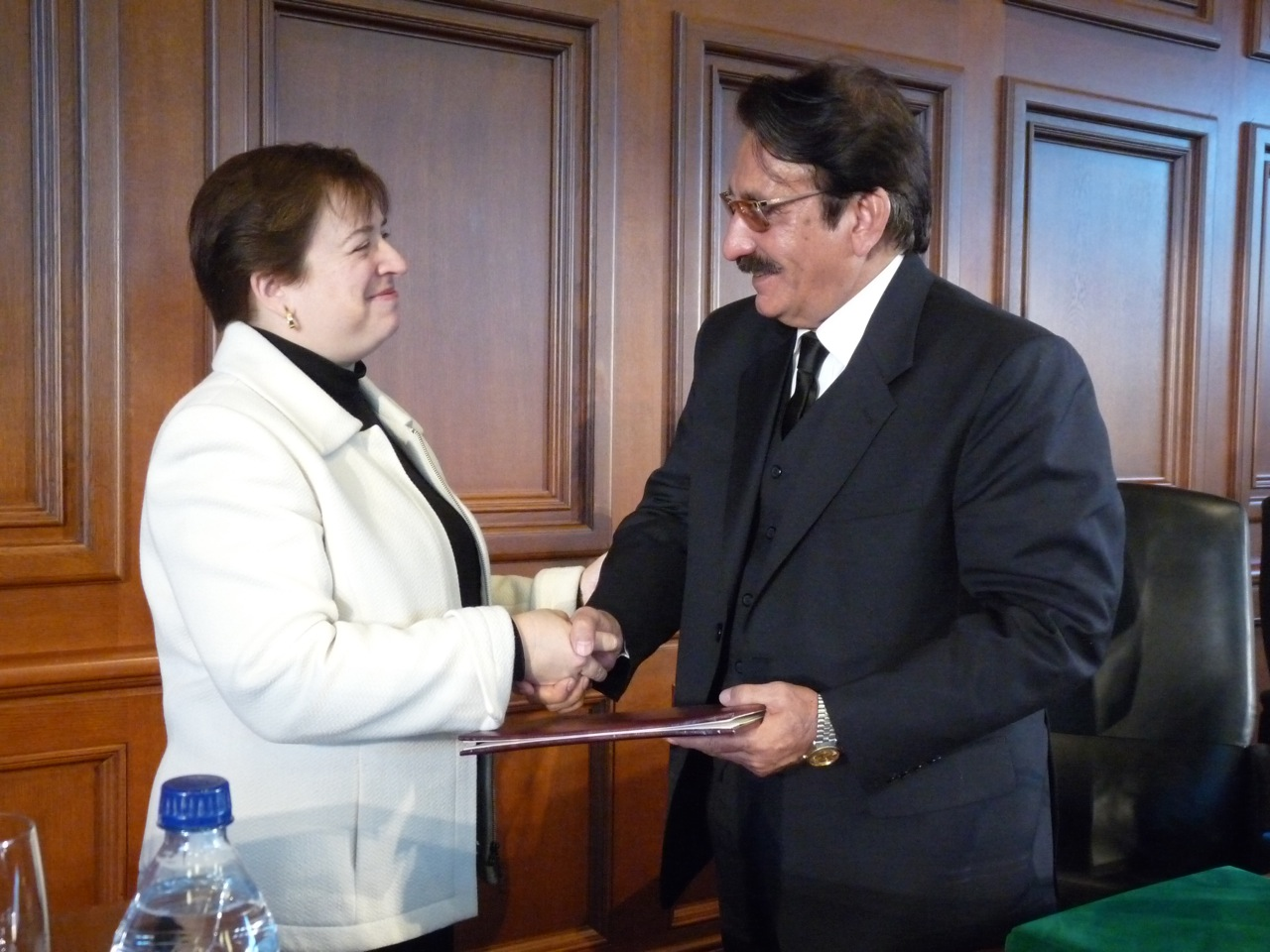
Elena Kagan, then the Dean of Harvard Law School, delivering the Medal of Freedom to Chief Justice Ifitkhar Chaudhry.

- Abdul Samad Khan Achakzai
- Rozi Khan Kakar, Pakistani senator
- Ali Ahmad Kurd
- Habib Jalib Baloch
- Iftikhar Muhammad Chaudhry, chief justice (Supreme Court)
- Jan Ali Changezi
- Javaid Iqbal, former chief justice (Supreme Court)
- Labh Singh Saini
- Mohammad Anwar Khan Durrani
- Qazi Faez Isa, chief justice (Balochistan High Court)
- Qazi Muhammad Essa Pakistan Movement leader
- Raja Muhammad Fayyaz Ahmad, former chief justice (Balochistan High Court)
- Sardar Yaqoob Khan Nasar Member Senate of Pakistan/ Politician
- Shahzada Rehmatullah Khan Saddozai Pakistan Movement Renowned activist and volunteer,
- Sima Samar
- Syed Nasir Ali Shah, Pakistani Parliamentarian
- Tariq Mahmood
- Younus Changezi Former Army officer /football player and Politician
- Yousef Pashtun
- Zeenat Karzai
- Haji Syed Hussain Hazara, Pakistani Senator
- Yahya Bakhtiar, lawyer and politician

== Sports persons ==
- Qayyum Changezi, footballer
- Ayub Dar, footballer
- Abbas Ali, footballer
- Rajab Ali, footballer
- Syed Hussain Abbas, footballer
- Abdul Wahid Durrani, footballer
- Abrar Hussain
- Asif Dar, boxer
- Aslam Bareach (born 1976), cricket umpire
- Bashir Shah, cricketer
- Bill Tancred, former athlete
- Fariba Rezayee, Judoka
- Hayatullah Khan Durrani, Legendary Cave explorer and Mountaineer
- Haider Ali, boxer
- Jawad Dawood, Canadian cricketer
- Lovell Wooldridge, cricketer
- Meena Hazara, karateka
- Mohammad Abubakar Durrani, Canoeing athlete
- Muhammad Waseem, boxer
- Nahida Khan, cricketer
- Nargis Hameedullah, karateka
- Nasim Khan, cricketer
- Pete Tancred, former athlete
- Shakeel Abbasi, field-hockey player
- Zeeshan Ashraf, field-hockey player

== See also ==
- List of Pakistanis
- List of people from Karachi
- List of people from Lahore
