= Taliban =

Afghan Islamist militant organization

- طَالِبَانْ (Tālibān)
- Flag of the Taliban, also used as the flag of Afghanistan
- Founders: Mullah Omar #; Abdul Ghani Baradar
- Supreme Leaders: Mullah Omar # (1994–2013); Akhtar Mansour X (2015–2016) (Note: Mansour ran the Taliban unofficially from 2013 to 2015, using Mullah Omar's name.); Hibatullah Akhundzada (2016–present)
- Deliberative body: Leadership Council
- Dates active: 1994–1996 (militia); 1996–2001 (1st government); 2001–2021 (insurgency); 2021–present (2nd government)
- Groups: Primarily Pashtuns; minority Tajiks and Uzbeks
- Headquarters: Kandahar (1994–2001; 2021–present)
- Active regions: Afghanistan
- Ideology: Deobandi jihadism; Islamic fundamentalism; Afghan nationalism; Pashtun nationalism; Atharism
- Political position: Far-right
- Size: Core strength: 45,000 (2001 est.); 11,000 (2008 est.); 36,000 (2010 est.); 60,000 (2014 est.); 60,000 (2017 est. excluding 90,000 local militia and 50,000 support elements); 75,000 (2021 est.); 168,000 soldiers and 210,121 police forces and pro-Taliban militia (2024 self-claim)
- Part of: Islamic Emirate of Afghanistan (2021–present, 1996–2001)
- Wars: War in Afghanistan; War on terror

The Taliban (Note: /ˈtælɪbæn, ˈtɑːlɪbɑːn/; Pashto: طَالِبَانْ, romanized: Tālibān, lit. 'students') is a Sunni Islamist political and militant organization which has governed Afghanistan since 2021. Having previously ruled the country from 1996 to 2001, the group was overthrown following the United States invasion of Afghanistan and fought a twenty-year war which ended in their return to power.

Emerging in 1994 as a faction in the Afghan Civil War (1992–1996), the Taliban largely consisted of warlords from the Pashtun areas of eastern and southern Afghanistan. Under the leadership of Mullah Omar, it took control of most of the country and, after seizing the capital Kabul in 1996, established a government which enforced a strict interpretation of Sharia. They were internationally condemned and isolated for their human rights practices. The Northern Alliance continued a civil war against the group and maintained international recognition as a continuation of the previous government.

After the September 11 attacks in 2001, the United States demanded the Taliban surrender al-Qaeda leader Osama bin Laden, who was residing in the country. Upon refusing to do so, Afghanistan was invaded by a US-led coalition and the Taliban government was overthrown, most of the group fleeing to neighboring Pakistan. Following the invasion, the Taliban regrouped and mounted an insurgency against the US-backed Islamic Republic of Afghanistan and coalition forces. After signing a peace deal with the US, the Taliban conducted a nationwide offensive in 2021 culminating in the fall of Kabul, the collapse of the Islamic Republic, and the reinstatement of the Islamic Emirate of Afghanistan.

The ideology of the Taliban is dominated by the Deobandi movement of Hanafi Islamic fundamentalism, along with elements of Pashtun nationalism. It is de facto the sole legal political force in the country, rejecting the principles of democracy and political parties. The group operates centrally under a supreme leader (Hibatullah Akhundzada since 2016) who wields unlimited power and issues fatwas serving both as law and religious instruction. The Taliban has been condemned for civilian massacres, human rights abuses and restrictions, particularly of women's rights, and persecuting ethnic and religious minorities. Unlike al-Qaeda and the Islamic State, it does not hold transnational aims—it remains discreetly allied with the former and is openly hostile to the latter. It is designated as a terrorist organization by several countries, and its government is largely unrecognized by the international community, with only Russia having granted it diplomatic recognition as of 2026.

== Etymology ==
The word Taliban is Pashto, طَالِباَنْ (ṭālibān), meaning "students", the plural of ṭālib. This is a loanword from Arabic طَالِبْ (ṭālib), using the Pashto plural ending -ān اَنْ. (In Arabic طَالِبَانْ (ṭālibān) means not "students" but rather "two students", as it is a dual form, the Arabic plural being طُلَّابْ (ṭullāb)—occasionally causing some confusion to Arabic speakers.) Since becoming a loanword in English, Taliban, besides a plural noun referring to the group, has also been used as a singular noun referring to an individual. For example, John Walker Lindh has been referred to as "an American Taliban" rather than "an American Talib" in domestic media. This is different in Afghanistan, where a member or a supporter of the group is referred to as a Talib (طَالِبْ) or its plural Talib-ha (طَالِبْهَا). In other definitions, Taliban means 'seekers'.

In English, the spelling Taliban has gained predominance over the spelling Taleban. In American English, the definite article is used; the group is referred to as "the Taliban" rather than "Taliban". In English-language media in Pakistan, the definite article is always omitted. Both Pakistani and Indian English-language media tend to name the group "Afghan Taliban", thus distinguishing it from the Pakistani Taliban. Additionally, in Pakistan, the word Talibans is often used when referring to more than one Taliban member. The group is also sometimes referred to as the Taliban Islamic Movement or Islamic Movement of Taliban, (Note: Pashto: د طالبانو اسلامي غورځنګ, romanized: De Talebano Islami Ghurdzang, lit. 'Islamic Movement of Students'; also transliterated as the Tahrik-e-Islami'a Taliban or Talibano Islami Tahrik) and often refers to itself by the name of the government it operates, the Islamic Emirate of Afghanistan.

In Afghanistan, the Taliban is frequently called the گرُوهِ طَالِبَانْ (Goroh-e Taleban), a Dari term which means 'Taliban group'. As per Dari/Persian grammar, there is no "the" prefix. Meanwhile, in Pashto, a determiner is normally used and as a result, the group is normally referred to as per Pashto grammar: دَ طَالِبَانْ (Da Taliban) or دَ طَالِبَانُو (Da Talibano).

== Background ==
=== Soviet intervention in Afghanistan (1978–1992) ===
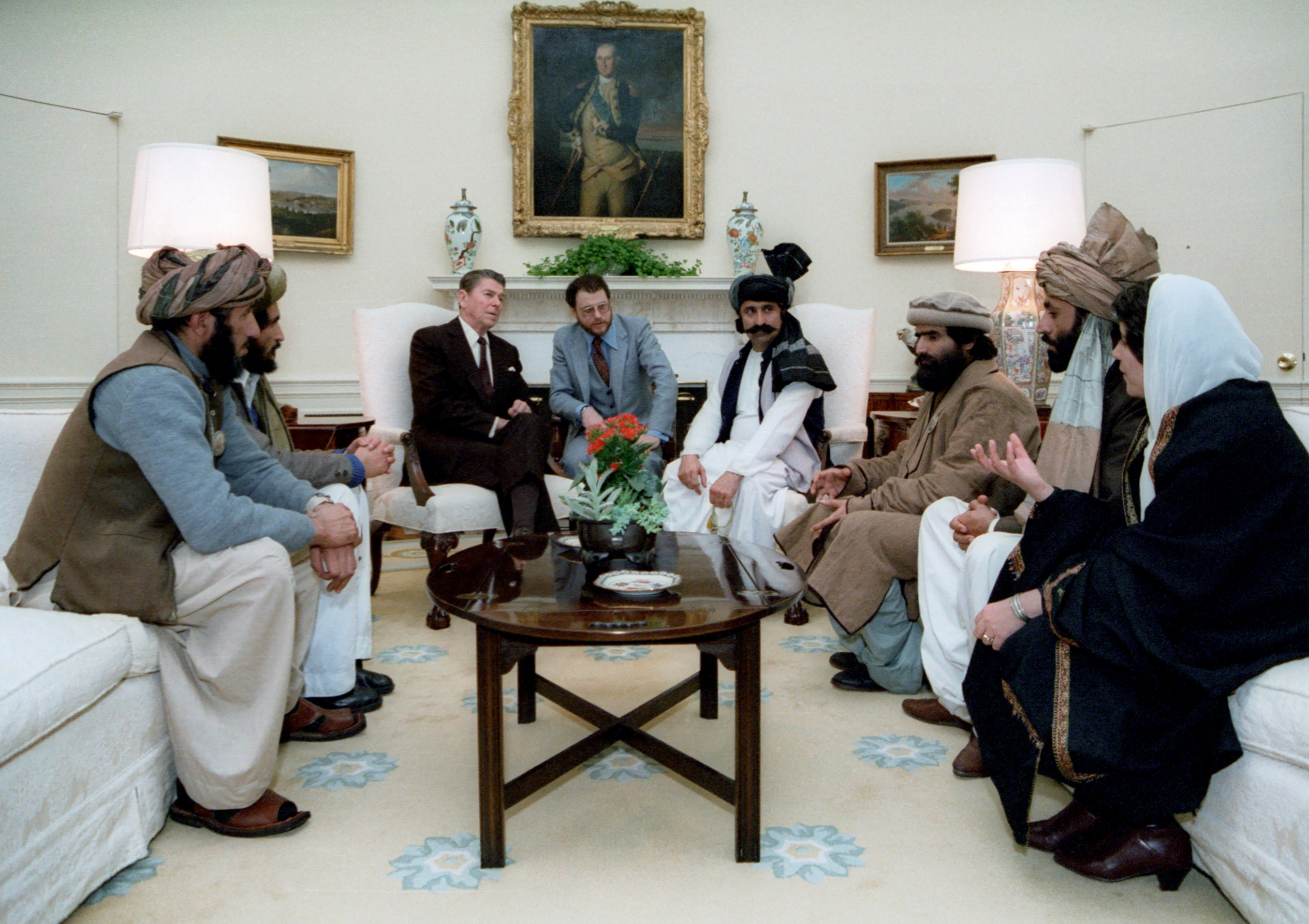
President Ronald Reagan meeting with Afghan Mujahideen leaders in the Oval Office in 1983

After the Soviet Union intervened and occupied Afghanistan in 1979, Islamic mujahideen fighters waged a war against Soviet forces. During the Soviet–Afghan War, nearly all of the Taliban's original leaders had fought for either the Hezb-i Islami Khalis or the Harakat-i Inqilab-e Islami factions of the Mujahideen.

Pakistan's President Muhammad Zia-ul-Haq feared that the Soviets were also planning to invade Balochistan, Pakistan, so he sent Akhtar Abdur Rahman to Saudi Arabia to garner support for the Afghan resistance against Soviet occupation forces. A while later, the US CIA and the Saudi Arabian General Intelligence Directorate (GID) funnelled funding and equipment through the Pakistani Inter-Service Intelligence Agency (ISI) to the Afghan mujahideen. About 90,000 Afghans, including Mullah Omar, were trained by Pakistan's ISI during the 1980s.

=== Afghan Civil War (1992–1996) ===
In April 1992, after the fall of the Soviet-backed régime of Mohammad Najibullah, many Afghan political parties agreed on a peace and power-sharing agreement, the Peshawar Accord, which created the Islamic State of Afghanistan and appointed an interim government for a transitional period. Gulbuddin Hekmatyar's Hezb-e Islami Gulbuddin, Hezbe Wahdat, and Ittihad-i Islami did not participate. The state was paralysed from the start, due to rival groups contending for total power over Kabul and Afghanistan.

Hekmatyar's Hezb-e Islami Gulbuddin party refused to recognise the interim government, and in April infiltrated Kabul to take power for itself, thus starting this civil war. In May, Hekmatyar started attacks against government forces and Kabul. Hekmatyar received operational, financial and military support from Pakistan's ISI. With that help, Hekmatyar's forces were able to destroy half of Kabul. Iran assisted the Hezbe Wahdat forces of Abdul Ali Mazari. Saudi Arabia supported the Ittihad-i Islami faction. The conflict between these militias also escalated into war.

Due to this sudden initiation of civil war, working government departments, police units or a system of justice and accountability for the newly created Islamic State of Afghanistan did not have time to form. Atrocities were committed by individuals inside different factions. Ceasefires, negotiated by representatives of the Islamic State's newly appointed Defense Minister Ahmad Shah Massoud, President Sibghatullah Mojaddedi and later President Burhanuddin Rabbani (the interim government), or officials from the International Committee of the Red Cross (ICRC), commonly collapsed within days. The countryside in northern Afghanistan, parts of which were under the control of Defense Minister Massoud, remained calm and some reconstruction took place. The city of Herat under the rule of Islamic State ally Ismail Khan also witnessed relative calm. Meanwhile, southern Afghanistan was neither under the control of foreign-backed militias nor the government in Kabul, but was ruled by local leaders such as Gul Agha Sherzai and their militias.

== History ==
The Taliban movement originated in Pashtun nationalism, and its ideological underpinnings are with that of broader Afghan society. Pakistan was heavily involved in creating the Taliban in 1994. The Taliban's roots lie in the religious schools of Kandahar and were influenced significantly by foreign support, particularly from Pakistan and Saudi Arabia, during the Soviet–Afghan War. They emerged in Afghanistan in the mid-1990s, capturing Kandahar and expanding their control across the country; they became involved in a war with the Northern Alliance. The international response to the Taliban varied, with some countries providing support while others opposed and did not recognize their regime.

During their rule from 1996 to 2001, the Taliban implemented strict religious regulations, notably affecting women's rights and cultural heritage. This period included significant ethnic persecution and the destruction of the Buddhas of Bamiyan. After the US-led invasion in 2001, the Taliban were ousted from power but regrouped and launched an insurgency that lasted two decades.

The Taliban returned to power in 2021 following the US withdrawal. Their efforts to establish the Islamic Emirate of Afghanistan continue, with education policies and international relations, including internal and external challenges faced by the Taliban regime.

=== 2021 offensive and return to power ===
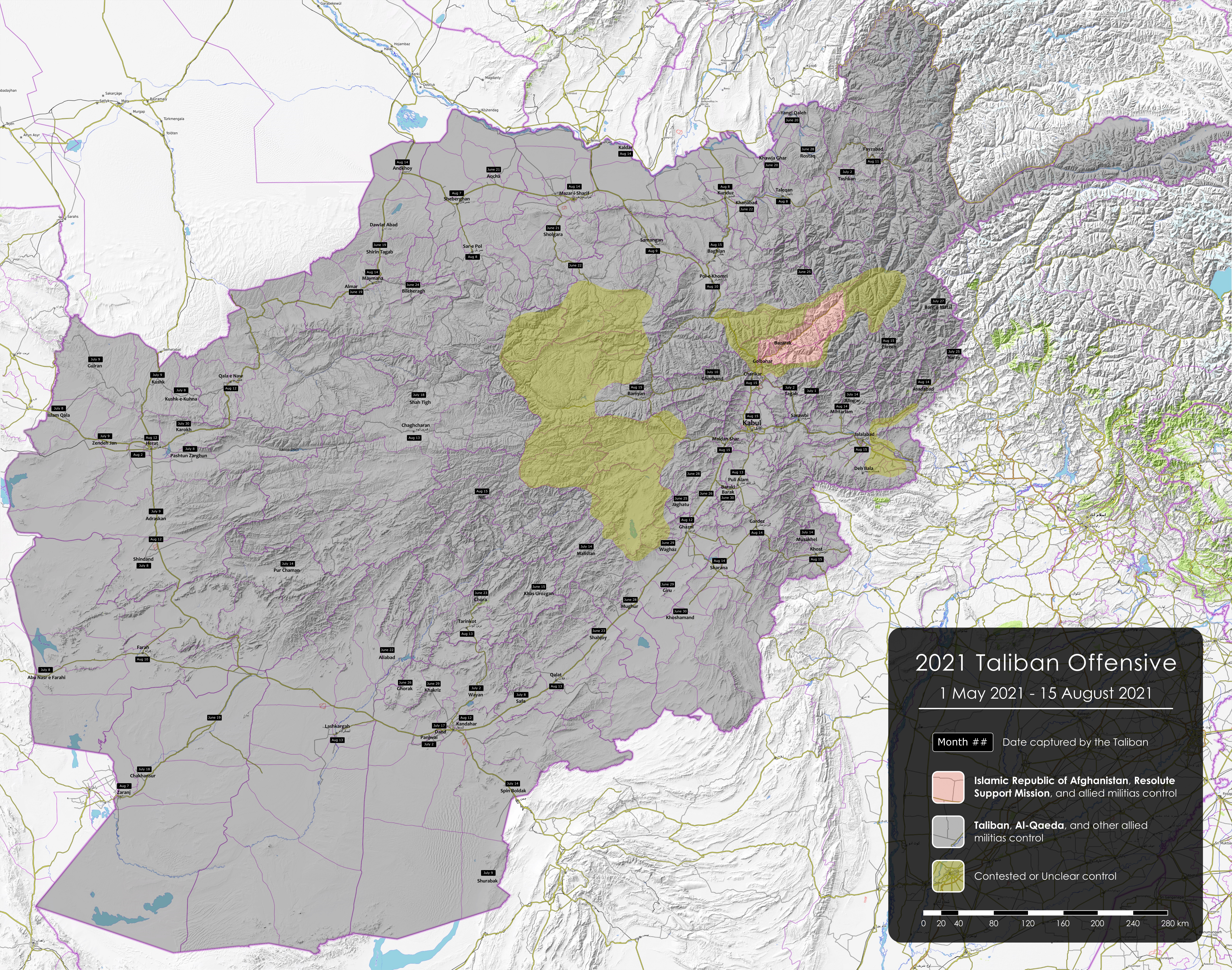
A map of Afghanistan showing the 2021 Taliban offensive

In mid-2021, the Taliban led a major offensive in Afghanistan during the withdrawal of US troops from the country, which gave them control of over half of Afghanistan's 421 districts as of 23 July 2021. By mid-August 2021, the Taliban controlled every major city in Afghanistan; following the near seizure of the capital Kabul, the Taliban occupied the Presidential Palace after incumbent President Ashraf Ghani fled Afghanistan to the United Arab Emirates. Ghani's asylum was confirmed by the UAE Ministry of Foreign Affairs and International Cooperation on 18 August 2021. Remaining Afghan forces under the leadership of Amrullah Saleh, Ahmad Massoud, and Bismillah Khan Mohammadi retreated to Panjshir to continue resistance.

=== Islamic Emirate of Afghanistan (2021–present) ===
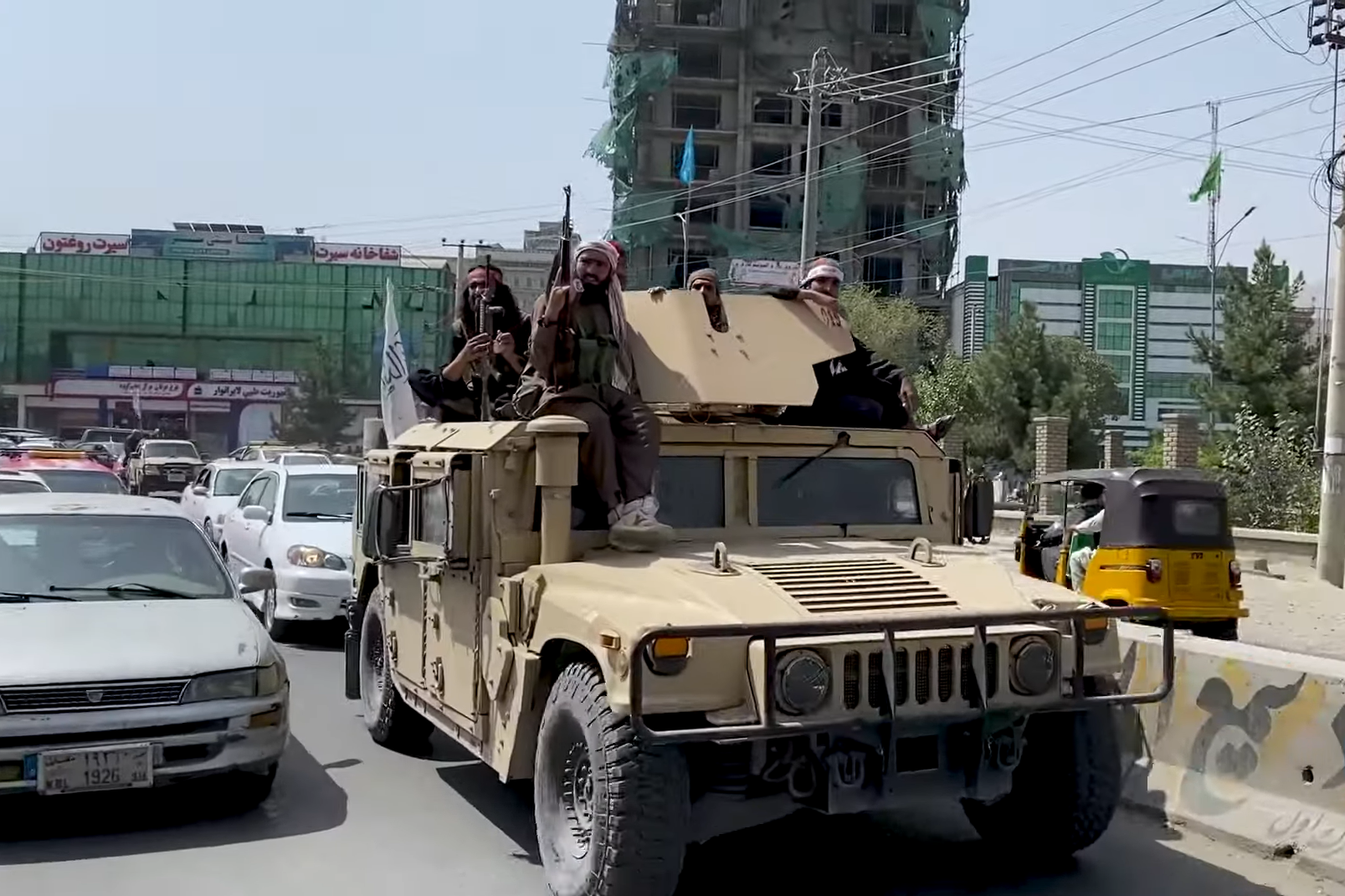
Taliban Humvee in Kabul, August 2021

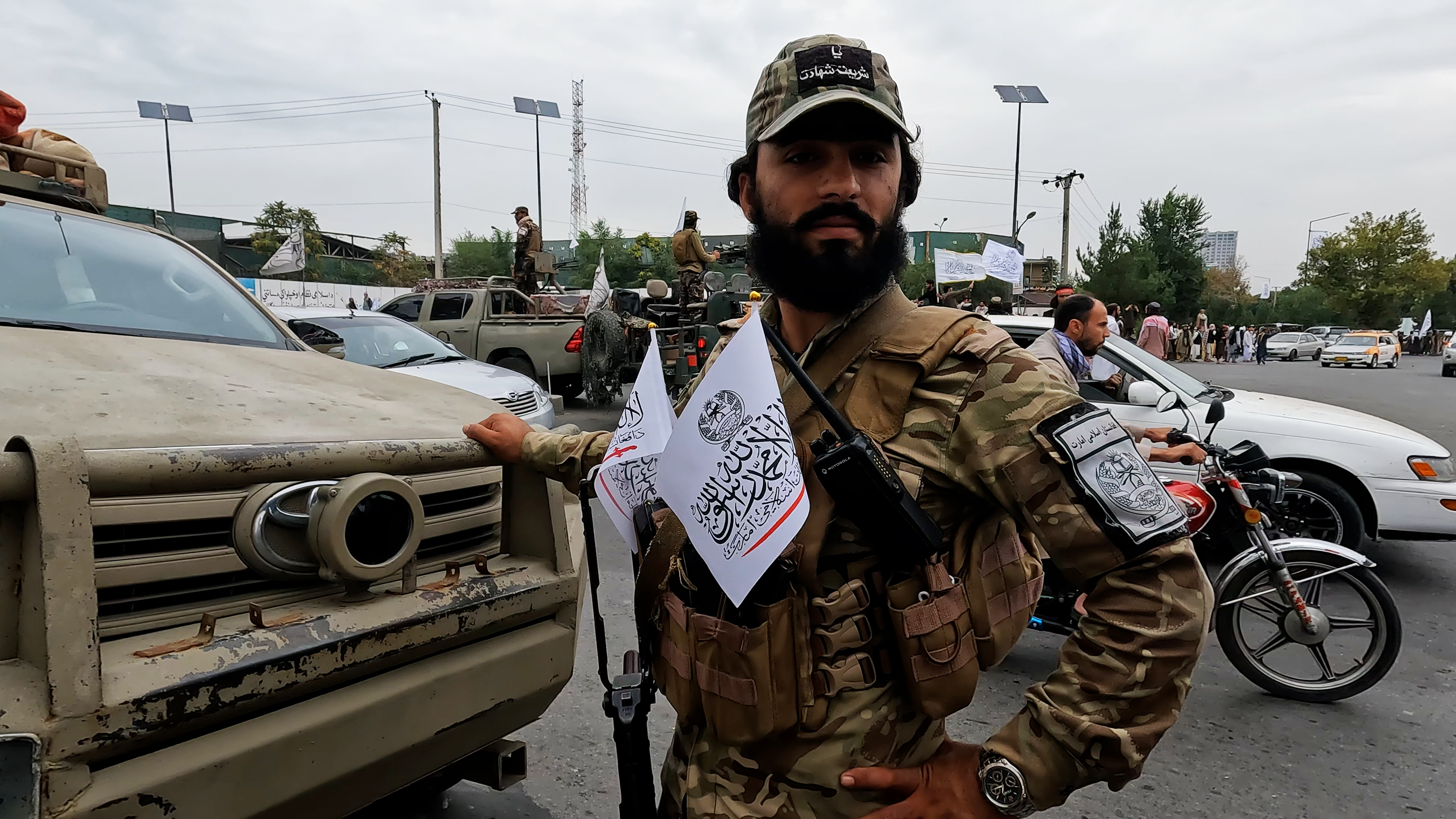
A Taliban member with chest flags in Kabul, August 2022

The Taliban seized power from a government supported by some of the world's most advanced militaries. As an ideological insurgent movement seeking to establish an Islamic state, its victory has been compared by commentators to the Chinese Communist Revolution of 1949 and the Iranian Revolution of 1979, both of which reshaped their societies. However, in interviews conducted in 2021–2022, senior Taliban leaders emphasized the relative moderation of their revolution and expressed a desire for constructive relations with the United States, according to journalist Jon Lee Anderson.

Anderson notes that the Taliban's earlier campaign against images and iconography has largely been abandoned, a change he suggests may be linked to the ubiquity of smartphones and social media. Local political figure Sayed Hamid Gailani argued that the Taliban have not carried out widespread killings since returning to power. Women continue to appear in public, and Taliban spokesperson Zabihullah Mujahid stated that some women remain employed in government ministries. He also claimed that girls would be permitted to attend secondary school once the government had access to frozen bank funds, which he said would allow the creation of separate facilities and transportation.

The Ministry of Women's Affairs was closed, and its building repurposed to house the Ministry for the Propagation of Virtue and the Prevention of Vice. According to Jon Lee Anderson, some women who remained formally employed by the government were required to sign in at their offices but then return home, a practice intended to create the appearance of gender equity. Anderson also reported that the appointment of ethnic minorities to government positions was described by a Taliban adviser as tokenistic. In response to international criticism over the lack of diversity in government appointments, the Taliban named an ethnic Hazara as deputy health minister and an ethnic Tajik as deputy trade minister.

Reports have circulated of Hazara farmers being displaced by ethnic Pashtuns, of raids on activists' homes, and of extrajudicial executions of former government soldiers and intelligence agents. A report released by Human Rights Watch in November 2021 stated that the Taliban killed or forcibly disappeared more than 100 former members of the Afghan security forces in the three months following their takeover, in the provinces of Ghazni, Helmand, Kandahar, and Kunduz. The report indicated that Taliban forces identified targets for arrest and execution through intelligence operations and access to employment records left behind. It also documented cases in which former security personnel were killed within days of registering with the Taliban to obtain letters guaranteeing their safety.

When asked about the violence against Hazara Shia communities, the Taliban's former nominee for ambassador to the United Nations, spokesman Suhail Shaheen, told Jon Lee Anderson that the Hazara Shia were regarded as fellow Muslims and part of Afghan society: "We believe we are one, like flowers in a garden."

Explanations for the relative moderation of the new Taliban government include its unexpected rapid takeover of the country, which left internal factions with unresolved issues, and the severe economic constraints created by frozen Afghan government funds abroad. Approximately US$7 billion in Afghan assets held in American banks were blocked, and about 80 percent of the former government's budget—previously funded by the United States, its partners, and international lenders—was cut off, contributing to a major economic crisis. According to the United Nations World Food Program country director Mary Ellen McGroarty, 22.8 million Afghans were already severely food insecure by late 2021, with seven million on the brink of famine. The international community has expressed a reluctance to recognize the Taliban regime, urging it to form an inclusive government, safeguard the rights of women and minorities, and prevent Afghanistan from serving as a base for global terrorist operations. In discussions with Jon Lee Anderson, senior Taliban leaders suggested that their strict application of sharia law during the 1990s was a response to the disorder left by the Soviet occupation, but asserted that mercy and compassion were now guiding principles. Former officials from the Ministry of Women's Affairs disputed these claims, with one telling Anderson that the Taliban's conciliatory statements were aimed at securing international financing, and predicted that women would eventually be forced to wear the burqa again.

In late 2021, journalists from The New York Times embedded with a six-man Taliban unit assigned to protect the Shi'ite Sakhi Shrine in Kabul from attacks by the Islamic State, highlighted that the men appeared to take their task seriously. The unit's commander stated that their goal was to provide security for all Afghans, regardless of ethnic background. Although Taliban officials claimed that the Islamic State had been defeated, the group carried out suicide bombings in October 2021 at Shia mosques in Kunduz and Kandahar, killing more than 115 people. As of late 2021, Kabul continued to experience frequent small-scale attacks, including "sticky bomb" explosions occurring every few days, according to Jon Lee Anderson.

After Taliban retook power in 2021, border clashes erupted between the Taliban with its neighbors includes Iran and Pakistan, leading to casualties on both sides.

In the early months of Taliban rule, international journalists have had some access to Afghanistan. In February 2022, several foreign journalists, including Andrew North, were detained. The Committee to Protect Journalists described the incident as indicative of a broader decline in press freedom and increasing attacks on journalists under Taliban rule. The journalists were released after several days. Watchdog organizations have since documented additional arrests of local journalists and restrictions on access for international reporters.

The country's small community of Sikhs—who form Afghanistan's second largest religious minority—as well as Hindus, were reported to have been prevented from publicly celebrating their holidays in 2023 by the Taliban government. The Taliban issued a later statement praising these communities and assured them that their private land and property would be secured. In April 2024, the former sole Sikh member of parliament, Narendra Singh Khalsa, returned to Afghanistan for the first time since the collapse of the Republic.

==== Current education policy ====
In September 2021, the government ordered primary schools to reopen for both sexes and announced plans to reopen secondary schools for male students, without committing to do the same for female students. While the Taliban stated that female college students would be able to resume higher education, provided that they were segregated from male students (and professors, when possible), The Guardian noted that failing to reopen high schools for girls could prevent women from being eligible for admission in higher education, thus rendering the Taliban government's pledge meaningless. Higher Education Minister Abdul Baqi Haqqani said that female university students would be required to observe a proper hijab, but did not specify whether this required covering the face.

Kabul University reopened in February 2022, with female students attending in the morning and male students in the afternoon. Other than the closure of the music department, few changes to the curriculum have been reported. Women were officially required to wear an abaya and a hijab to attend, although some wore a shawl instead. Attendance was reportedly low on the first day.

In March 2022, the Taliban abruptly halted plans to allow girls to resume secondary school education, even when separated from males. At the time, The Washington Post reported that apart from university, sixth grade became the highest level of education attainable for girls in the Afghan educational system. The country's Ministry of Education cited the lack of an acceptable design for female student uniforms.

On 20 December 2022, the Taliban banned female students from attending higher education institutions with immediate effect. The following day, 21 December 2022, the Taliban revoked their plans for gender-inclusive education altogether and instituted a ban on all education for all girls and women around the country, alongside a ban on female staff in schools, including teaching professions. Teaching was one of the last few remaining professions open to women.

==== Transition from jihad to governance ====
According to a report by the Afghanistan Analysts Network, after the Taliban took power, many former fighters from the countryside were reassigned to office-based roles in Kabul. They reported finding it difficult to adjust from their former lifestyle that included few responsibilities and a flexible schedule.

== Ideology and aims ==
Scholarship places the Taliban's ideology on the far-right of the left–right political spectrum. It has been described as an "innovative form of sharia combining Pashtun tribal codes", or Pashtunwali, with radical Deobandi interpretations of Islam favoured by Jamiat Ulema-e-Islam and its splinter groups. Their ideology was a departure from the Islamism of the anti-Soviet mujahideen rulers and the radical Islamists inspired by the Sayyid Qutb (Ikhwan). The Taliban have said they aim to restore peace and security to Afghanistan, including Western troops leaving, and to enforce Sharia, or Islamic law, once in power.

According to journalist Ahmed Rashid, at least in the first years of their rule, the Taliban adopted Deobandi and Islamist anti-nationalist beliefs, and they opposed "tribal and feudal structures", removing traditional tribal or feudal leaders from leadership roles.

The Taliban strictly enforced their ideology in major cities like Herat, Kabul, and Kandahar. But in rural areas, the Taliban had little direct control, and as a result, they promoted village jirgas, so in rural areas, they did not enforce their ideology as stringently as they enforced it in cities.

=== Ideological influences ===
The Taliban's religious/political philosophy, especially during its first régime from 1996 to 2001, was heavily advised and influenced by Grand Mufti Rashid Ahmed Ludhianvi and his works. Its operating political and religious principles since its founding, however, were modeled on those of Abul A'la Maududi and the Jamaat-e-Islami movement.

==== Pashtun nationalism ====
The Taliban, being largely Pashtun tribespeople, frequently follow a pre-Islamic cultural tribal code focused on preserving honor. Pashtunwali strongly influences decisions regarding other social matters. It is best described as subconscious social values and attitudes promoting various qualities such as bravery, preserving honor, being hospitable to all guests, seeking revenge and justice if one has been wronged, and providing sanctuary to anyone who seeks refuge, even an enemy. However, non-Pashtuns and others usually criticize some of the values, such as the Pashtun practice of equally dividing inheritances among sons, even though the Qur'an clearly states that women are supposed to receive one-half of a man's share.

According to Ali A. Jalali and Lester Grau, the Taliban "received extensive support from Pashtuns across the country who thought that the movement might restore their national dominance. Even Pashtun intellectuals in the West, who differed with the Taliban on many issues, expressed support for the movement on purely ethnic grounds."

=== Islamic rules under Deobandi politics ===
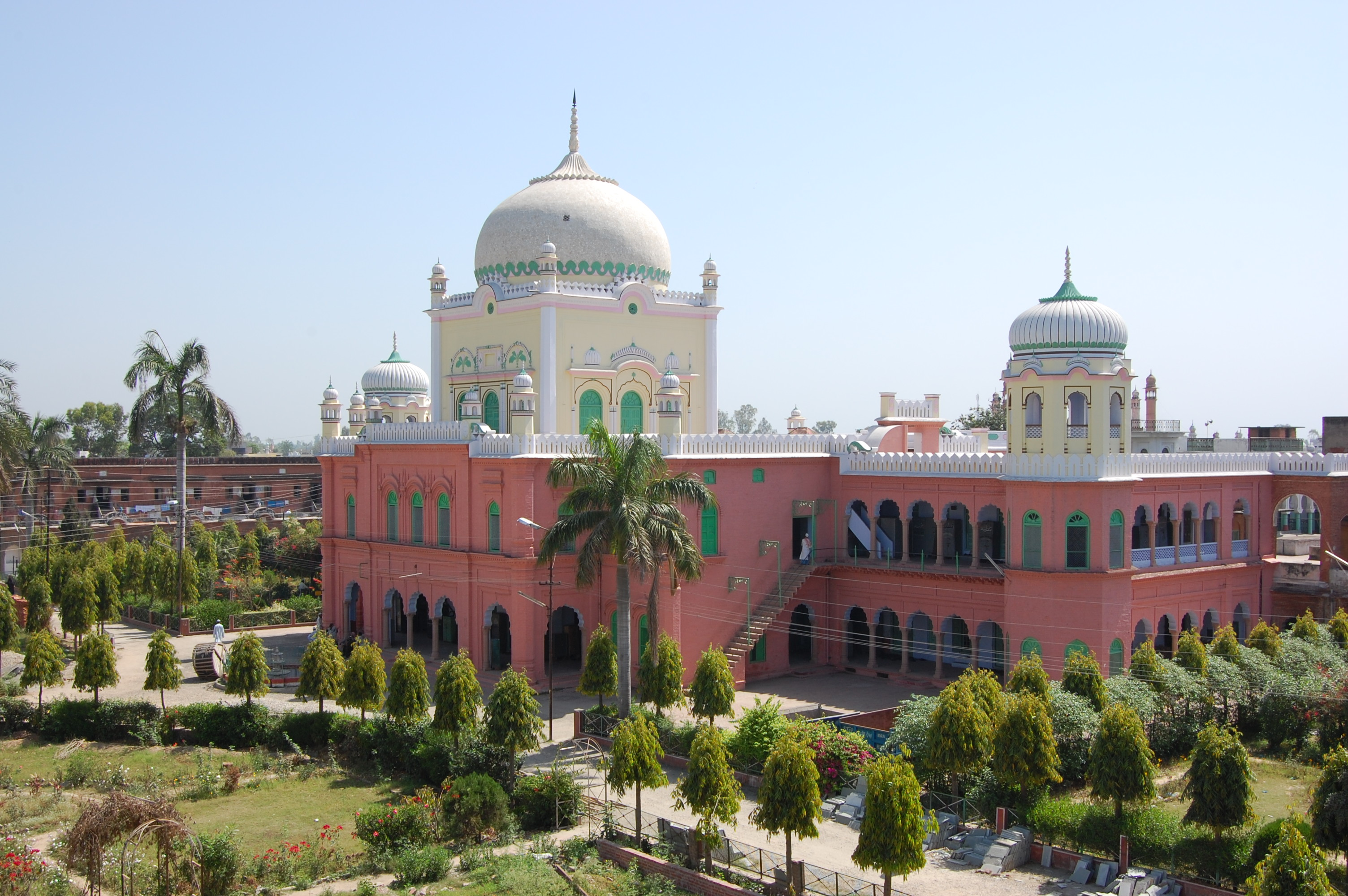
The Darul Uloom Deoband in Uttar Pradesh, India, where the Deobandi movement began

Written works published by the group's Commission of Cultural Affairs, including Islami Adalat, De Mujahid Toorah – De Jihad Shari Misalay, and Guidance to the Mujahideen outlined the core of the Taliban Islamic Movement's views regarding jihad, sharia, organization, and conduct. The Taliban régime interpreted the Sharia law in accordance with the Hanafi school of Islamic jurisprudence and the religious edicts of Mullah Omar. The Taliban, Mullah Omar in particular, emphasised dreams as a means of revelation.

==== Prohibitions ====
The Taliban forbade the consumption of pork and alcohol, the use of many types of consumer technology such as music with instrumental accompaniments, television, filming, and the Internet, as well as most forms of art such as paintings or photography, participation in sports, including football and chess; recreational activities such as kite-flying and the keeping of pigeons and other pets were also forbidden, and the birds were killed according to the Taliban's rules. Movie theatres were closed and repurposed as mosques. The celebration of the Western and Iranian New Years was also forbidden. Taking photographs and displaying pictures and portraits were also banned because the Taliban considered them forms of idolatry. This extended even to "blacking out illustrations on packages of baby soap in shops and painting over road-crossing signs for livestock.

Women were banned from working, girls were forbidden to attend schools or universities, were required to observe purdah (physical separation of the sexes) and awrah (concealing the body with clothing), and to be accompanied by male relatives outside their households; those who violated these restrictions were punished. Men were forbidden to shave their beards, and they were also required to let them grow and keep them long according to the Taliban's rules, and they were also required to wear turbans outside their households. Prayer was made compulsory. Those men who did not respect the religious obligation after the azaan were arrested. Gambling was banned, and the Taliban punished thieves by amputating their hands or feet. In 2000, the Taliban's leader Mullah Omar officially banned opium cultivation and drug trafficking in Afghanistan; the Taliban succeeded in nearly eradicating the majority of the opium production (99%) by 2001. During the Taliban's governance of Afghanistan, drug users and dealers were both severely persecuted.

==== Views on the Bamyan Buddhas ====
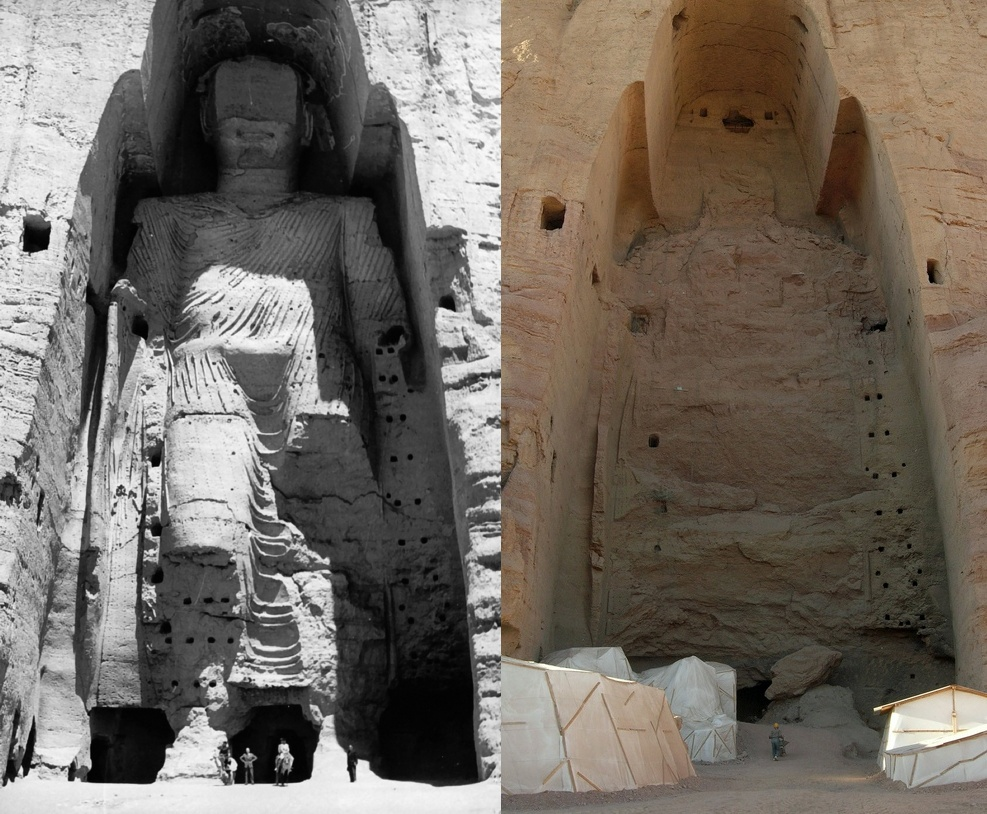
Taller Buddha in 1963 and in 2008 after destruction

In 1999, Mullah Omar issued a decree in which he called for the protection of the Buddha statues at Bamyan, two 6th-century monumental statues of standing buddhas which were carved into the side of a cliff in the Bamyan valley in the Hazarajat region of central Afghanistan. But in March 2001, the Taliban destroyed the statues, following a decree by Mullah Omar, which stated: "All the statues around Afghanistan must be destroyed."

In March 2001, Omar declared the statues to be idols forbidden by Islamic law. He stated that "Muslims should be proud of smashing idols. It has given praise to Allah that we have destroyed them."

Later, on 18 March, then-ambassador-at-large Sayed Rahmatullah Hashemi said that the destruction of the statues was carried out by the Head Council of Scholars after a Swedish monuments expert proposed to restore the statues' heads. Rahmatullah Hashemi is reported as saying: "When the Afghan head council asked them to provide the money to feed the children instead of fixing the statues, they refused and said, 'No, the money is just for the statues, not for the children'. Herein, they made the decision to destroy the statues"; however, he did not comment on the claim that a foreign museum offered to "buy the Buddhist statues, the money from which could have been used to feed children". Rahmatullah Hashemi added: "If we had wanted to destroy those statues, we could have done it three years ago," referring to the start of U.S. sanctions. "In our religion, if anything is harmless, we just leave it. If money is going to statues while children are dying of malnutrition next door, then that makes it harmful, and we destroy it." Hashemi denied any religious grounds in the justification of the statues' destruction.

In 2004, following the American invasion of Afghanistan and his exile, Omar explained in an interview:

I did not want to destroy the Bamiyan Buddha. In fact, some foreigners came to me and said they would like to conduct the repair work of the Bamiyan Buddha that had been slightly damaged due to rains. This shocked me. I thought, these callous people have no regard for thousands of living human beings—the Afghans who are dying of hunger, but they are so concerned about non-living objects like the Buddha. This was extremely deplorable. That is why I ordered its destruction. Had they come for humanitarian work, I would have never ordered the Buddha's destruction.

==== Views on bacha bazi ====
The Afghan custom of bacha bazi, a form of pederastic sexual slavery, child sexual abuse and pedophilia which is traditionally practiced in various provinces of Afghanistan between older men and young adolescent "dancing boys", was also forbidden under the six-year rule of the Taliban régime. Under the rule of the Islamic Emirate of Afghanistan, it carried the death penalty.

The practice remained illegal during the Islamic Republic of Afghanistan's rule, but the laws were seldom enforced against powerful offenders, and police had reportedly been complicit in related crimes. A controversy arose during the Islamic Republic of Afghanistan's rule, after allegations surfaced that US government forces in Afghanistan after the invasion of the country deliberately ignored bacha bazi. The US military responded by claiming the abuse was largely the responsibility of the "local Afghan government".

=== Attitudes towards other Muslim communities ===
Unlike other Islamic fundamentalist organizations, the Taliban are not Salafists. Although wealthy Arab nations had brought Salafist Madrasas to Afghanistan during the Soviet war in the 1980s, the Taliban's strict Deobandi leadership suppressed the Salafi movement in Afghanistan after it first came to power in the 1990s. Following the 2001 US invasion, the Taliban and Salafists joined forces to wage a common war against NATO forces. Still, Salafists were relegated to small groups which were under the Taliban's command.

The Taliban are averse to debating doctrine with other Muslims and "did not allow even Muslim reporters to question [their] edicts or to discuss interpretations of the Qur'an."

==== Opposition to Salafism ====
Following the Taliban victory, a nationwide campaign was launched against influential Salafi factions suspected of past ties to the ISIS–K. The Taliban closed most Salafi mosques and seminaries in 16 provinces, including Nangarhar, and detained clerics it accused of supporting the Islamic State.

==== Shia Islam ====
During the period of the first Taliban rule (1996 to 2001), the Taliban attempted to sway Shias, particularly Hazaras, to their side, making deals with a number of Shia political figures, as well as securing the support of some Shia religious scholars. One of these was Ustad Muhammad Akbari, a Shia Hazara politician who separated from Abdul-Ali Mazari's Islamic Unity Party to form the National Islamic Unity Party, thereafter politically aligning himself and his group, which gained the support of the majority of Islamic Unity Party members in the Hazara hinterland, with the Taliban. Another significant Shia political figure in the administration of the first Islamic Emirate was Sayed Gardizi, a Seyyed Hazara from Gardez, who was appointed as the wuluswal (district governor) of Yakawlang District, being the only Shia to hold the position of district governor during the period of the first Islamic Emirate of Afghanistan.

At the same time, however, certain incidents caused distrust between the Taliban and Afghan Shias. The 1998 Mazar-i-Sharif massacre was the most significant, having taken place in response to ethnic Uzbek warlord Abdul Rashid Dostum's betrayal and subsequent massacre of Taliban fighters, as well as false rumors that Hazaras had beheaded senior Taliban leader Mawlawi Ihsanullah Ihsan at the grave of Abdul-Ali Mazari, which led to the massacre of a significant number of Hazaras. The commander responsible for the massacre, Abdul-Manan Niazi, later became notable for his opposition to the Taliban's leadership, having formed the rebellious High Council of the Islamic Emirate of Afghanistan in 2015, before being killed, reportedly by the Taliban themselves.

The desire of the Taliban leadership to expand the group's relations with Afghan Shias continued after the American invasion of Afghanistan and the group's return to insurgency. Some time following the American Invasion of Iraq in 2003, the Taliban published "A Message to the Mujahid People of Iraq and Afghanistan" by Mullah Omar, in which he condemned sectarianism whilst jointly addressing the people of Iraq and Afghanistan, saying:

"It's incumbent upon all Muslims to thwart all the cursed plots of the cunning enemy, and to not give him the opportunity to light the fires of disagreement amongst the Muslims. A major component of American policy is to categorize the Muslims in Iraq with the labels of Shī'ah and Sunnī, and in Afghanistan with the labels of Pashtun, Tājīk, Hazārah and Uzbek, in order to decrease the severity and strength of the popular uprisings and the accompanying armed resistance. [...] As such, I request the brothers in Iraq to put behind them the differences that exist in the name of Shī'ah and Sunnī, and to fight in unity against the occupying enemy, for victory is not possible without unity."

Multiple Hazara Shia Taliban commanders took part in the Taliban insurgency, primarily from Bamyan and Daikundi provinces. Among the Qarabaghi tribe of Shia Hazaras, a number of fighters voluntarily joined the Taliban due to their close relations with the nearby Taliban-supporting Sunni Pashtun population. Additionally, a pro-government Shia Hazara militia from Gizab district of Daikundi province, called Fedayi, defected and pledged allegiance to the Taliban a few years before 2016, with a reported size of 50 fighters.

In reaction to the 2011 Afghanistan Ashura bombings, which targeted Shia Afghans in Kabul and Mazar-i-Sharif, the Taliban published "Sectarian Killings; A Dangerous Enemy Conspiracy" by Taliban official Abdul Qahar Balkhi, in which he stated:

"In Afghanistan, Sunnis and Shias have co-existed for centuries. They live communal lives and participate in their mutual festivities. And for centuries they have fought shoulder to shoulder against foreign invaders. [...] The majority of Shia populations in Bamyan, Daikundi and Hazarajat [have] actively aided and continue to support the Mujahideen against the foreigners and their puppets. The foreign occupiers seek to ignite the flames of communal hatred and violence between Sunnis and Shias in Afghanistan. [...] The followers of Islam will only ever reclaim their rightful place in this world if they forgo their petty differences and unite as a single egalitarian body."

In recent years, the Taliban have once again attempted to court Shiites, appointing a Shia cleric as a regional governor and recruiting Hazaras to fight against ISIS–K, in order to distance themselves from their past reputation and improve their relations with the Shia-led Government of Iran. After the 2021 Taliban offensive, which led to the restoration of the Islamic Emirate, senior Taliban officials, including Deputy Prime Minister Abdul Salam Hanafi and Foreign Minister Amir Khan Muttaqi, have stressed the importance of unity between Shiites and Sunnis in Afghanistan and promised to protect the Shiite community. The Ministry of Virtue and Vice have also agreed to hire Shia Ulama in order to implement the ministry's religious edicts. In general, the Taliban has maintained peace with most Muslims in the Shiite community, although the 2022 Balkhab uprising resulted in the deaths of some Hazaras.

=== Consistency of the Taliban's ideology ===
The Taliban's ideology is not static. Before its capture of Kabul, members of the Taliban talked about stepping aside once a government of "good Muslims" took power and once law and order were restored. The decision-making process of the Taliban in Kandahar was modelled on the Pashtun tribal council (jirga), together with what was believed to be the early Islamic model. Discussion was followed by the building of a consensus by the believers.

As the Taliban's power grew, Mullah Omar made decisions without consulting the jirga or visiting other parts of the country. He visited the capital, Kabul, only twice while in power. Taliban spokesman Mullah Wakil explained:

Decisions are based on the advice of the Amir-ul Momineen. For us consultation is not necessary. We believe that this is in line with the Sharia. We abide by the Amir's view even if he alone takes this view. There will not be a head of state. Instead there will be an Amir al-Mu'minin. Mullah Omar will be the highest authority and the government will not be able to implement any decision to which he does not agree. General elections are incompatible with Sharia and therefore we reject them.

Another sign that the Taliban's ideology was evolving was Mullah Omar's 1999 decree in which he called for the protection of the Buddha statues at Bamyan and the destruction of them in 2001.

=== Evaluations and criticisms ===
The author Ahmed Rashid suggests that the devastation and hardship which resulted from the Soviet invasion and the period which followed it influenced the Taliban's ideology. It is said that the Taliban did not include scholars who were learned in Islamic law and history. The refugee students brought up in a totally male society had no education in mathematics, science, history, or geography, no traditional skills of farming, herding, or handicraft-making, or even knowledge of their tribal and clan lineages. In such an environment, war meant employment, peace meant unemployment. Dominating women affirmed manhood. For their leadership, rigid fundamentalism was a matter of principle and political survival. Taliban leaders "repeatedly told" Rashid that "if they gave women greater freedom or a chance to go to school, they would lose the support of their rank and file."

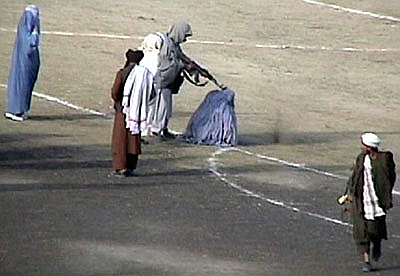
November 1999 public execution in Kabul of a mother of five who was found guilty of killing her husband with an axe while he slept

The Taliban have been criticized for their strictness towards those who disobeyed their imposed rules, and Mullah Omar has been criticized for titling himself Amir al-Mu'minin.

Mullah Omar was criticized for calling himself Amir al-Mu'minin because he lacked scholarly learning, tribal pedigree, or connections to the Prophet's family. The sanction for the title traditionally required the support of all of the country's ulema, whereas only some 1,200 Pashtun Taliban-supporting Mullahs had declared that Omar was the Amir. According to Ahmed Rashid, "no Afghan had adopted the title since 1834, when King Dost Mohammed Khan assumed the title before he declared jihad against the Sikh kingdom in Peshawar. But Dost Mohammed was fighting foreigners, while Omar had declared jihad against other Afghans."

Another criticism was that the Taliban called their 20% tax on truckloads of opium "zakat," which is traditionally limited to 2.5% of the zakat payers' disposable income (or wealth).

The Taliban have been compared to the 7th-century Kharijites who developed extreme doctrines that set them apart from both mainstream Sunni and Shiʿa Muslims. The Kharijites were particularly noted for adopting a radical approach to takfir, whereby they declared that other Muslims were unbelievers and deemed them worthy of death.

In particular, the Taliban have been accused of takfir towards Shia. After the August 1998 slaughter of 8,000 mostly Shia Hazara non-combatants in Mazar-i-Sharif, Mullah Abdul Manan Niazi, the Taliban commander of the attack and the new governor of Mazar, who the Taliban later killed after forming the rebellious High Council of the Islamic Emirate, declared from Mazar's central mosque:

Last year you rebelled against us and killed us. From all your homes you shot at us. Now we are here to deal with you. The Hazaras are not Muslims and now have to kill Hazaras. You either accept to be Muslims or leave Afghanistan. Wherever you go we will catch you. If you go up we will pull you down by your feet; if you hide below, we will pull you up by your hair.

Carter Malkasian, in one of the first comprehensive historical works on the Afghan war, argues that the Taliban are oversimplified in most portrayals. While Malkasian thinks that "oppressive" remains the best word to describe them, he points out that the Taliban managed to do what multiple governments and political players failed to: bring order and unity to the "ungovernable land". The Taliban curbed the atrocities and excesses of the Warlord period of the civil war from 1992–1996. Malkasian further argues that the Taliban's imposing of Islamic ideals upon the Afghan tribal system was innovative and a key reason for their success and durability. Given that traditional sources of authority had been shown to be weak during the long period of civil war, only religion had proved decisive in Afghanistan. In a period of 40 years of constant conflict, the traditionalist Islam of the Taliban proved to be far more stable, even if the order they brought was "an impoverished peace".

== Condemned practices ==
The Taliban have been internationally condemned for their harsh enforcement of their interpretation of Islamic Sharia law, which has resulted in their brutal treatment of many Afghans. During their rule from 1996 to 2001, the Taliban enforced a strict interpretation of Sharia, or Islamic law. The Taliban and their allies committed massacres against Afghan civilians, denied UN food supplies to 160,000 starving civilians, and conducted a policy of scorched earth, burning vast areas of fertile land and destroying tens of thousands of homes. While the Taliban controlled Afghanistan, they banned activities and media including paintings, photography, and movies that depicted people or other living things. They also prohibited music with instrumental accompaniments, with the exception of the daf, a type of frame drum. The Taliban prevented girls and young women from attending school, banned women from working jobs outside of healthcare (male doctors were prohibited from treating women), and required that women be accompanied by a male relative and wear a burqa at all times when in public. If women broke certain rules, they were publicly whipped or executed. The Taliban harshly discriminated against religious and ethnic minorities during their rule and they have also committed a cultural genocide against the people of Afghanistan by destroying numerous monuments, including the famous 1500-year-old Buddhas of Bamiyan. According to the United Nations, the Taliban and their allies were responsible for 76% of Afghan civilian casualties in 2010, and 80% in 2011 and 2012. The group is internally funded by its involvement in the illegal drug trade which it participates in by producing and trafficking in narcotics such as heroin, extortion, and kidnapping for ransom. They also seized control of mining operations in the mid-2010s that were illegal under the previous government.

=== Massacre campaigns ===
According to a 55-page report by the United Nations, the Taliban, while trying to consolidate control over northern and western Afghanistan, committed systematic massacres against civilians. UN officials stated that there had been "15 massacres" between 1996 and 2001. They also said, that "[t]hese have been highly systematic and they all lead back to the [Taliban] Ministry of Defense or to Mullah Omar himself." "These are the same type of war crimes as were committed in Bosnia and should be prosecuted in international courts", one UN official was quoted as saying. The documents also reveal the role of Arab and Pakistani support troops in these killings. Bin Laden's so-called 055 Brigade was responsible for mass-killings of Afghan civilians. The report by the United Nations quotes "eyewitnesses in many villages describing Arab fighters carrying long knives used for slitting throats and skinning people". The Taliban's former ambassador to Pakistan, Mullah Abdul Salam Zaeef, in late 2011 stated that cruel behaviour under and by the Taliban had been "necessary".

In 1998, the United Nations accused the Taliban of denying emergency food by the UN's World Food Programme to 160,000 hungry and starving people "for political and military reasons". The UN said the Taliban were starving people for their military agenda and using humanitarian assistance as a weapon of war.

On 8 August 1998, the Taliban launched an attack on Mazar-i-Sharif. Of the 1500 defenders only 100 survived the engagement. Once in control the Taliban began to kill people indiscriminately. At first shooting people in the street, they soon began to target Hazaras. Women were raped, and thousands of people were locked in containers and left to suffocate. This ethnic cleansing left an estimated 5,000 to 6,000 people dead. At this time ten Iranian diplomats and a journalist were killed. Iran assumed the Taliban had murdered them, and mobilised its army, deploying men along the border with Afghanistan. By the middle of September there were 250,000 Iranian personnel stationed on the border. Pakistan mediated and the bodies were returned to Tehran towards the end of the month. The killings of the diplomats had been carried out by Sipah-e-Sahaba Pakistan, a Pakistani Sunni group with close ties to ISI. They burned orchards, crops and destroyed irrigation systems, and forced more than 100,000 people from their homes with hundreds of men, women and children still unaccounted for.

In a major effort to retake the Shomali Plains to the north of Kabul from the United Front, the Taliban indiscriminately killed civilians, while uprooting and expelling the population. Among others, Kamal Hossein, a special reporter for the UN, reported on these and other war crimes. In Istalif, a town famous for handmade potteries and which was home to more than 45,000 people, the Taliban gave 24 hours' notice to the population to leave, then completely razed the town leaving the people destitute.

In 1999, the town of Bamian was taken, and hundreds of men, women and children were executed. Houses were razed and some were used for forced labour. There was a further massacre at the town of Yakaolang in January 2001. An estimated 300 people were murdered, along with two delegations of Hazara elders who had tried to intercede.

By 1999, the Taliban had forced hundreds of thousands of people from the Shomali Plains and other regions conducting a policy of scorched earth burning homes, farmland and gardens.

=== Human trafficking ===
Several Taliban and al-Qaeda commanders ran a network of human trafficking, abducting ethnic minority women and selling them into sex slavery in Afghanistan and Pakistan. Time magazine writes: "The Taliban often argued that the restrictions they placed on women were actually a way of revering and protecting the opposite sex. The behavior of the Taliban during the six years they expanded their rule in Afghanistan made a mockery of that claim."

The targets for human trafficking were especially women from the Tajik, Uzbek, Hazara and other non-Pashtun ethnic groups in Afghanistan. Some women preferred to commit suicide over slavery, killing themselves. During one Taliban and al-Qaeda offensive in 1999 in the Shomali Plains alone, more than 600 women were kidnapped. Arab and Pakistani al-Qaeda militants, with local Taliban forces, forced them into trucks and buses. Time magazine writes: "The trail of the missing Shomali women leads to Jalalabad, not far from the Pakistan border. There, according to eyewitnesses, the women were penned up inside Sar Shahi camp in the desert. The more desirable among them were selected and taken away. Some were trucked to Peshawar with the apparent complicity of Pakistani border guards. Others were taken to Khost, where bin Laden had several training camps." Officials from relief agencies say, the trail of many of the vanished women leads to Pakistan where they were sold to brothels or into private households to be kept as slaves.

=== Oppression of women ===
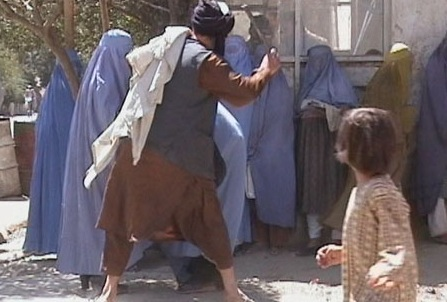
Taliban religious police beating a woman in Kabul on 26 August 2001

To PHR's knowledge, no other régime in the world has methodically and violently forced half of its population into virtual house arrest, prohibiting them on pain of physical punishment.

— Physicians for Human Rights, 1998

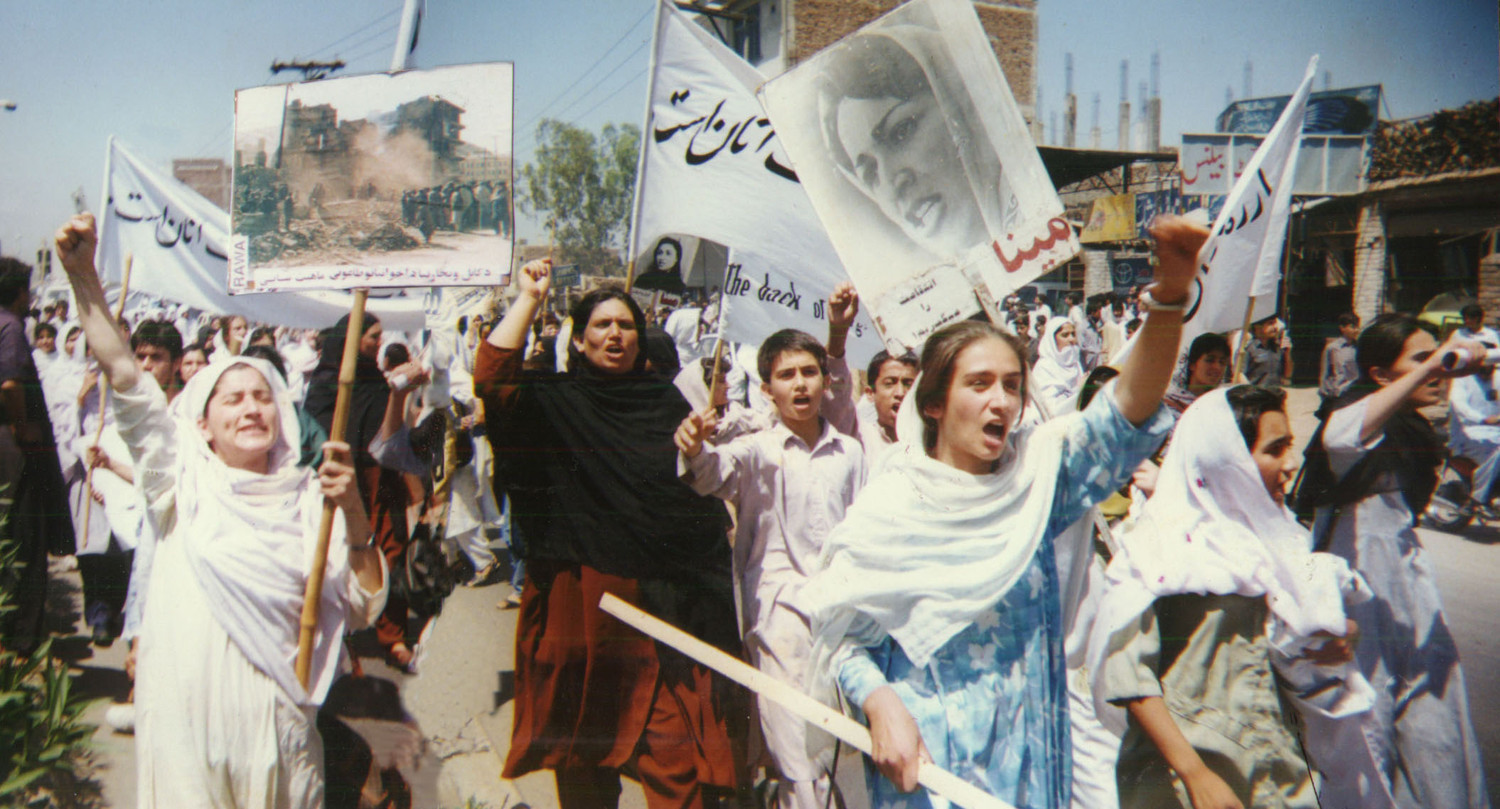
Members of the Revolutionary Association of the Women of Afghanistan protesting against the Taliban, in Peshawar, Pakistan in 1998

Brutal repression of women was widespread under the Taliban and it received significant international condemnation. Abuses were myriad and violently enforced by the religious police. For example, the Taliban issued edicts forbidding women from being educated, forcing girls to leave schools and colleges. Women who were leaving their houses were required to be accompanied by a male relative and were obligated to wear the burqa, a traditional dress covering the entire body except for a small slit out of which to see. Those women who were accused of disobedience were publicly beaten. In one instance, a young woman named Sohaila was charged with adultery after she was caught walking with a man who was not a relative; she was publicly flogged in Ghazi Stadium, receiving 100 lashes. Female employment was restricted to the medical sector, where male medical personnel were prohibited from treating women and girls. This extensive ban on the employment of women further resulted in the widespread closure of primary schools, as almost all teachers prior to the Taliban's rise had been women, further restricting access to education not only to girls but also to boys. Restrictions became especially severe after the Taliban took control of the capital. In February 1998, for instance, religious police forced all women off the streets of Kabul and issued new regulations which ordered people to blacken their windows so that women would not be visible from outside.

==== Ban on women's participation in the healthcare sector ====
In December 2024, the Taliban's health ministry banned women from being trained in nursing and midwifery, according to media reports confirmed by The Guardian. This was a reversal of an earlier February 2024 decision to permit basic medical training for women. According to NPR, the health ministry had lobbied for an exemption from the general ban on women's education in the healthcare sector because "in some provinces, the Taliban does not allow women to seek treatment from male medical professionals." The Taliban's ban on basic medical training for women was widely condemned by human rights organizations as a danger to the health and well-being of Afghan women and children, with Afghanistan already having among the highest maternal mortality ratios in the world according to 2020 data, before the Taliban's 2021 seizure of power. For example, Heather Barr of Human Right Watch stated: "If you ban women from being treated by male healthcare professionals, and then you ban women from training to become healthcare professionals, the consequences are clear: women will not have access to healthcare and will die as a result." The Office of the United Nations High Commissioner for Human Rights (OHCHR) stated that the ban "is profoundly discriminatory, short-sighted and puts the lives of women and girls at risk in multiple ways."

==== ICC case ====
In July 2025, the International Criminal Court issued arrest warrants for Taliban leaders over their alleged persecution of women in Afghanistan.

=== Violence against civilians ===
According to the United Nations, the Taliban and its allies were responsible for 76% of civilian casualties in Afghanistan in 2009, 75% in 2010 and 80% in 2011.

According to Human Rights Watch, the Taliban's bombings and other attacks which have led to civilian casualties "sharply escalated in 2006" when "at least 669 Afghan civilians were killed in at least 350 armed attacks, most of which appear to have been intentionally launched at non-combatants."

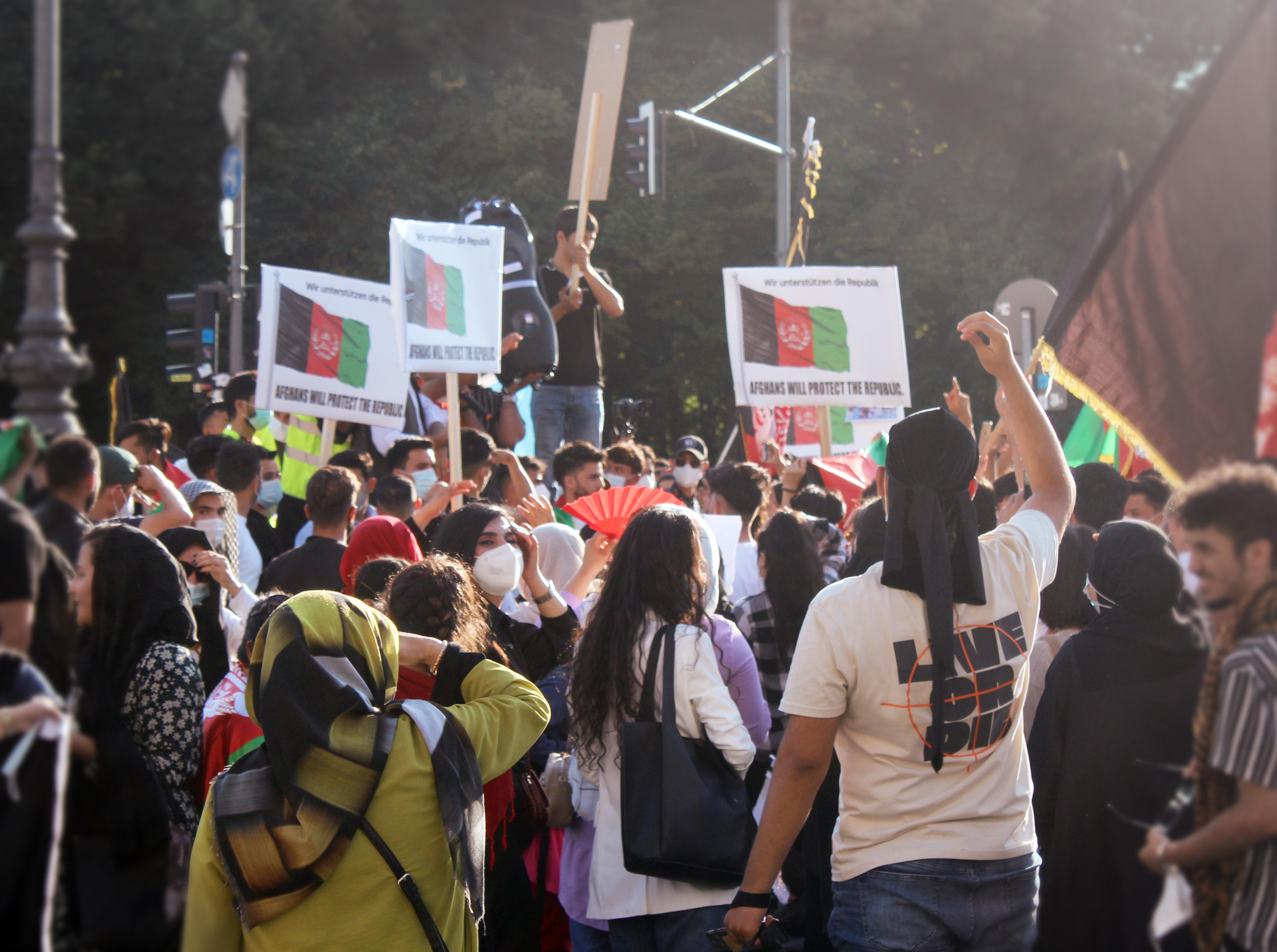
Afghans in Germany protesting against Taliban violence, 14 August 2021

The United Nations reported that the number of civilians killed by both the Taliban and pro-government forces in the war rose by nearly 50% between 2007 and 2009. The high number of civilians killed by the Taliban is blamed in part on their increasing use of improvised explosive devices (IEDs), "for instance, 16 IEDs have been planted in girls' schools" by the Taliban.

In 2009, Colonel Richard Kemp, formerly Commander of British forces in Afghanistan and the intelligence coordinator for the British government, drew parallels between the tactics and strategy of Hamas in Gaza to those of the Taliban. Kemp wrote:

Like Hamas in Gaza, the Taliban in southern Afghanistan are masters at shielding themselves behind the civilian population and then melting in among them for protection. Women and children are trained and equipped to fight, collect intelligence, and ferry arms and ammunition between battles. Female suicide bombers are increasingly common. The use of women to shield gunmen as they engage NATO forces is now so normal it is deemed barely worthy of comment. Schools and houses are routinely booby-trapped. Snipers shelter in houses deliberately filled with women and children.

— Richard Kemp, Commander of British forces in Afghanistan

=== Discrimination against Hindus and Sikhs ===
Hindus and Sikhs have lived in Afghanistan since historic times and they were prominent minorities in Afghanistan, well-established in terms of academics and businesses. After the Afghan Civil War they started to migrate to India and other nations. After the Taliban established the Islamic Emirate of Afghanistan, they imposed strict Sharia laws which discriminated against Hindus and Sikhs and caused the size of Afghanistan's Hindu and Sikh populations to fall at a very rapid rate because they emigrated from Afghanistan and established diasporas in the Western world. The Taliban issued decrees that forbade non-Muslims from building places of worship but allowed them to worship at existing holy sites, forbade non-Muslims from criticizing Muslims, ordered non-Muslims to identify their houses by placing a yellow cloth on their rooftops, forbade non-Muslims from living in the same residence as Muslims, and required that non-Muslim women wear a yellow dress with a special mark so that Muslims could keep their distance from them (Hindus and Sikhs were mainly targeted). The Taliban announced in May 2001 that it would force Afghanistan's Hindu population to wear special badges, which has been compared to the treatment of Jews in Nazi Germany. In general, the Taliban treated the Sikhs better than Afghan Shiites, Hindus and Christians.

=== Relationship with other religious groups ===
Along with Hindus, the small Christian community was also persecuted by the Taliban. Violence against Western aid workers and Christians was common during the Afghan conflict.

On several occasions between 2008 and 2012, the Taliban claimed that they assassinated Western and Afghani medical or aid workers in Afghanistan, because they feared that the polio vaccine would make Muslim children sterile, because they suspected that the 'medical workers' were really spies, or because they suspected that the medical workers were proselytizing Christianity.

In August 2008, three Western women (British, Canadian, US) working for the aid group International Rescue Committee were murdered in Kabul. The Taliban claimed that they killed them because they were foreign spies. In October 2008, the British woman Gayle Williams working for Christian UK charity SERVE Afghanistan – focusing on training and education for disabled persons – was murdered near Kabul. The Taliban claimed they killed her because her organisation "was preaching Christianity in Afghanistan". At least 29 aid workers, five of whom were foreign, were killed in Afghanistan in 2008.

In August 2010, the Taliban claimed to have killed 10 medical aid workers while they were passing through Badakhshan Province on their way from Kabul to Nuristan Province – but the Afghan Islamic party/militia Hezb-e Islami Gulbuddin has also claimed responsibility for those killings. The victims were six Americans, one Briton, one German and two Afghanis, working for a self-proclaimed "non-profit, Christian organization" which is named 'International Assistance Mission'. The Taliban stated that they killed them because they were proselytizing Christianity and possessing Bibles which were translated into the Dari language when they were encountered. IAM contended that they "were not missionaries".

In December 2012, unidentified gunmen killed four female UN polio-workers in Karachi in Pakistan; the Western news media suggested that there was a connection between the outspokenness of the Taliban and objections to and suspicions of such 'polio vaccinations'. Eventually in 2012, a Pakistani Taliban commander in North Waziristan in Pakistan banned polio vaccinations, and in March 2013, the Afghan government was forced to suspend its vaccination efforts in Nuristan Province because the Taliban was extremely influential in the province. However, in May 2013, the Taliban's leaders changed their stance on polio vaccinations, saying that the vaccine is the only way to prevent polio and they also stated that they will work with immunization volunteers as long as polio workers are "unbiased" and "harmonized with the regional conditions, Islamic values and local cultural traditions."

During the first period of Taliban rule, only two known Jews were left in Afghanistan, Zablon Simintov and Isaac Levy (c. 1920–2005). Levy relied on charity to survive, while Simintov ran a store selling carpets and jewelry until 2001. They lived on opposite sides of the dilapidated Kabul synagogue. They kept denouncing each other to the authorities, and both spent time in jail for continuously "arguing". The Taliban also confiscated the synagogue's Torah scroll. However, the two men were later released from prison when Taliban officials became annoyed by their arguing. After August 2021, the last Jew Simintov and his relative left Afghanistan, ending centuries of Jewish presence in the country.

=== Restrictions on modern education ===
Before the Taliban came to power, education was highly regarded in Afghanistan and Kabul University attracted students from Asia and the Middle East. However, the Taliban imposed restrictions on modern education, banned the education of females, only allowed Islamic religious schools to stay open and only encouraged the teaching of the Qur'an. Around half of all of the schools in Afghanistan were destroyed. The Taliban have carried out brutal attacks on teachers and students and they have also threatened parents and teachers. As per a 1998 UNICEF report, 9 out of 10 girls and 2 out of 3 boys did not enroll in schools. By 2000, fewer than 4–5% of all Afghan children were being educated at the primary school level and even fewer of them were being educated at higher secondary and university levels.

Attacks on educational institutions, students and teachers and the forced enforcement of Islamic teachings have even continued after the Taliban were deposed from power. In December 2017, United Nations Office for the Coordination of Humanitarian Affairs (OCHA) reported that over 1,000 schools had been destroyed, damaged or occupied and 100 teachers and students had been killed by the Taliban.

=== Cultural genocide ===
The Taliban have committed a cultural genocide against the Afghan people by destroying their historical and cultural texts, artifacts and sculptures.

In the early 1990s, the National Museum of Afghanistan was attacked and looted numerous times, resulting in the loss of 70% of the 100,000 artifacts of Afghan culture and history which were then on display.

On 11 August 1998, the Taliban destroyed the Puli Khumri Public Library. The library contains a collection of over 55,000 books and old manuscripts, one of the most valuable and beautiful collections of Afghanistan's cultural works according to the Afghan people.

On 2 March 2001, the Buddhas of Bamiyan were destroyed with dynamite, on orders from the Taliban's leader Mullah Omar.

In October of the same year, the Taliban "took sledgehammers and axes to thousands of years' worth of artifacts" in the National Museum of Afghanistan, destroying at least 2,750 ancient works of art.

Afghanistan has a rich musical culture, where music plays an important part in social functions like births and marriages and it has also played a major role in uniting an ethnically diverse country. However, since it came to power and even after it was deposed, the Taliban has banned most music, including cultural folk music, and it has also attacked and killed a number of musicians.

=== Ban on entertainment and recreational activities ===
During their first rule of Afghanistan which lasted from 1996 to 2001, the Taliban banned many recreational activities and games, such as association football, kite flying, and chess. Mediums of entertainment such as televisions, cinemas, music with instrumental accompaniments, VCRs and satellite dishes were also banned. Also included on the list of banned items were "musical instruments and accessories" and all visual representation of living creatures. However, the daf, a type of frame drum, wasn't banned.

It was reported that when Afghan children were caught kiting, a highly popular activity, they were beaten. When Khaled Hosseini learned through a 1999 news report that the Taliban had banned kite flying, a restriction he found particularly cruel, the news "struck a personal chord" for him, as he had grown up with the sport while living in Afghanistan. Hosseini was motivated to write a 25-page short story about two boys who fly kites in Kabul that he later developed into his first novel, The Kite Runner.

=== Forced conscription and conscription of children ===
According to the testimony of Guantanamo captives before their Combatant Status Review Tribunals, the Taliban, in addition to conscripting men to serve as soldiers, also conscripted men to staff its civil service – both done at gunpoint.

According to a report from Oxford University, the Taliban made widespread use of the conscription of children in 1997, 1998 and 1999. The report states that during the civil war that preceded the Taliban régime, thousands of orphaned boys joined various militia for "employment, food, shelter, protection and economic opportunity." The report said that during its initial period, the Taliban "long depended upon cohorts of youth". Witnesses stated that each land-owning family had to provide one young man and $500 in expenses. In August of that year 5000 students aged between 15 and 35 left madrassas in Pakistan to join the Taliban.

== Leadership and organization ==
Kandahar faction and Haqqani network

According to Jon Lee Anderson the Taliban government is "said to be profoundly divided" between the Kandahar faction and the Haqqani network, with a mysterious disappearance of deputy Prime Minister Abdul Ghani Baradar for "several days" in mid-September 2021 explained by rumours of injury after a brawl with other Taliban. The Kandahar faction is named for the city that Mullah Omar came from and where he founded the Taliban, and is described as "insular" and "rural", interested "primarily" in "ruling its home turf". It includes Haibatullah Akhundzada, Mullah Yaqoob, Abdul Ghani Baradar (see below).

The family-based Haqqani network, by contrast are "closely linked to Pakistan's secret services", "interested in global jihad", with its founder (Jalaluddin Haqqani) "connected" the Taliban with Osama bin Laden. It is named for its founder Jalaluddin Haqqani and is currently led by Sirajuddin Haqqani, and includes Khalil Haqqani, Mawlawi Mohammad Salim Saad. With Sirajuddin Haqqani as acting interior minister, as of February 2022, the network has control of "a preponderance of security positions in Afghanistan".

Taliban leadership has denied tensions between the factions. Suhail Shaheen states "there is one Taliban", and Zabihullah Mujahid (acting Deputy Minister of Information and Culture), even maintains "there is no Haqqani network."

=== Current leadership ===
The top members of the Taliban, as of August 2021, are:

- Hibatullah Akhundzada, the Taliban's Supreme Leader since 2016, a religious scholar from Kandahar province.
- Abdul Ghani Baradar, co-founder of the movement alongside Mullah Omar, was deputy Prime Minister as of March 2022. From Uruzgan province, he was imprisoned in Pakistan before his release at the request of the United States.
- Mullah Yaqoob, the son of the Taliban's founder Mullah Omar and leader of the group's military operations.
- Sirajuddin Haqqani, leader of the Haqqani network is acting interior minister as of February 2022, with authority over police and intelligence services. He oversees the group's financial and military assets between the Afghanistan-Pakistan border. The U.S. government has a $10 million bounty for his arrest brought on by several terrorist attacks on hotels and the Indian Embassy.
- Sher Mohammad Abbas Stanikzai, former head of the group's political office in Doha. From Logar province, he holds a university master's degree and trained as a cadet at the Indian Military Academy.
- Abdul Hakim Ishaqzai, chief negotiator of the group's political office in Doha, replacing Stanikzai in 2020. Heads the Taliban's powerful council of religious scholars.
- Suhail Shaheen, Taliban nominee for Ambassador to the U.N.; former spokesperson of the Taliban's political office in Doha. University educated in Pakistan, he was editor of the English language Kabul Times in the 1990s and served as a deputy ambassador to Pakistan at the time.
- Zabihullah Mujahid, the Taliban's spokesperson since 2007. He revealed himself to the public for the first time after the group's capture of Kabul in 2021.

All the top leadership of the Taliban are ethnic Pashtuns, more specifically those belonging of the Ghilzai confederation.

=== Overview ===
Until his death in 2013, Mullah Omar was the supreme commander of the Taliban. Mullah Akhtar Mansour was elected as his replacement in 2015, and following Mansour's killing in a May 2016 US drone strike, Mawlawi Hibatullah Akhundzada became the group's leader.

The Taliban initially enjoyed goodwill from Afghans weary of the warlords' corruption, brutality, and incessant fighting. This popularity was not universal, particularly among non-Pashtuns.

In 2001, the Taliban, de jure, controlled 85% of Afghanistan. De facto the areas under its direct control were mainly Afghanistan's major cities and highways. Tribal khans and warlords had de facto direct control over various small towns, villages, and rural areas.

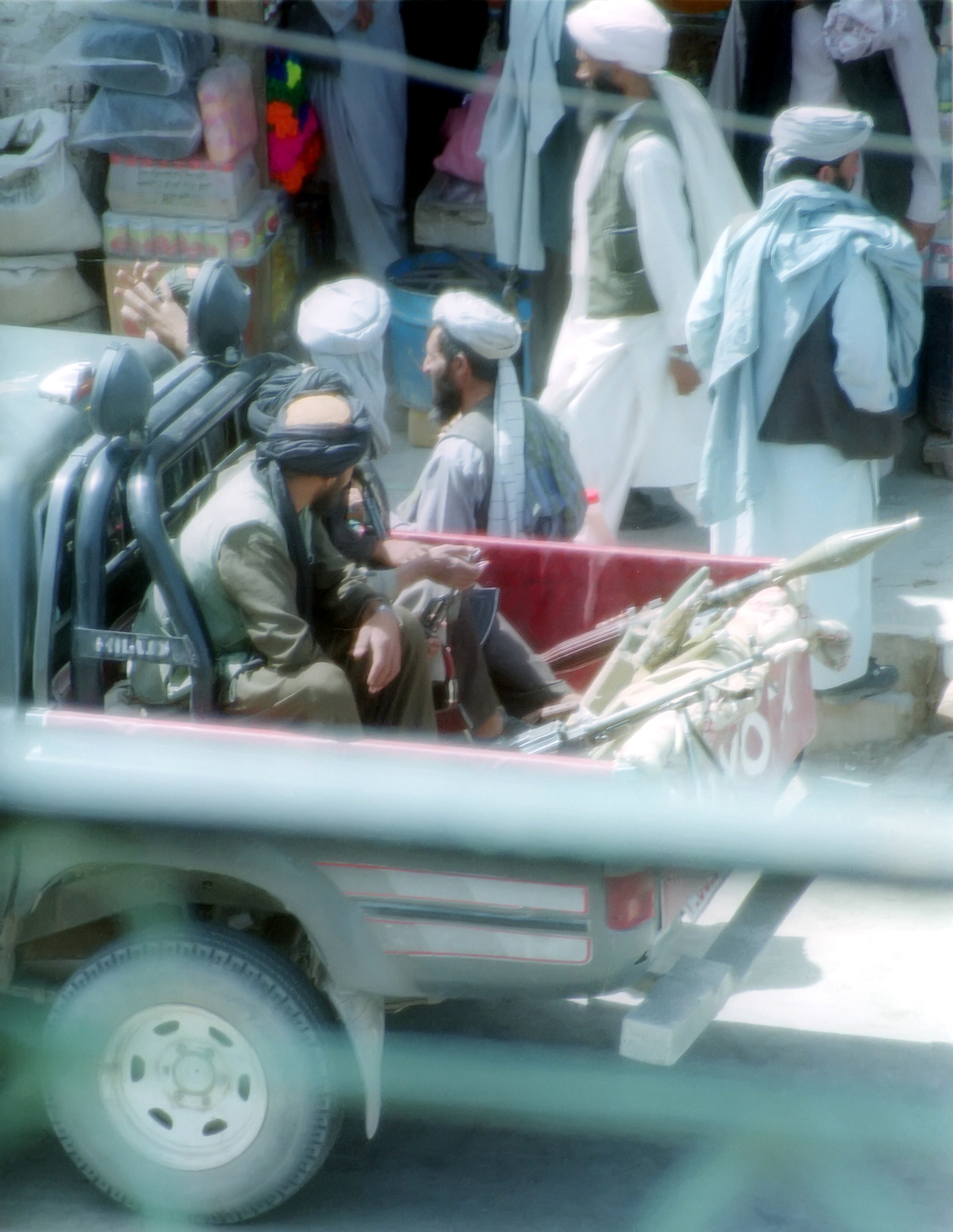
Taliban police patrolling the streets of Herat in a pick-up truck

Rashid described the Taliban government as "a secret society run by Kandaharis ... mysterious, secretive, and dictatorial." They did not hold elections, as their spokesman explained:

The Sharia does not allow politics or political parties. That is why we give no salaries to officials or soldiers, just food, clothes, shoes, and weapons. We want to live a life like the Prophet lived 1400 years ago, and jihad is our right. We want to recreate the time of the Prophet, and we are only carrying out what the Afghan people have wanted for the past 14 years.

They modelled their decision-making process on the Pashtun tribal council (jirga), together with what they believed to be the early Islamic model. Discussion was followed by a building of a consensus by the "believers". Before capturing Kabul, there was talk of stepping aside once a government of "good Muslims" took power, and law and order were restored.

As the Taliban's power grew, decisions were made by Mullah Omar without consulting the jirga and without consulting other parts of the country. He visited the capital, Kabul, only twice while in power. Instead of an election, their leader's legitimacy came from an oath of allegiance ("Bay'ah"), in imitation of the Prophet and the first four Caliphs. On 4 April 1996, Mullah Omar had "the Cloak of the Prophet Mohammed" taken from its shrine for the first time in 60 years. Wrapping himself in the relic, he appeared on the roof of a building in the center of Kandahar while hundreds of Pashtun mullahs below shouted "Amir al-Mu'minin!" (Commander of the Faithful), in a pledge of support. Taliban spokesman Mullah Wakil explained:

Decisions are based on the advice of the Amir-ul Momineen. For us consultation is not necessary. We believe that this is in line with the Sharia. We abide by the Amir's view even if he alone takes this view. There will not be a head of state. Instead there will be an Amir al-Mu'minin. Mullah Omar will be the highest authority, and the government will not be able to implement any decision to which he does not agree. General elections are incompatible with Sharia and therefore we reject them.

The Taliban were very reluctant to share power, and since their ranks were overwhelmingly Pashtun they ruled as overlords over the 60% of Afghans from other ethnic groups. In local government, such as Kabul city council or Herat, Taliban loyalists, not locals, dominated, even when the Pashto-speaking Taliban could not communicate with the roughly half of the population who spoke Dari or other non-Pashtun tongues. Critics complained that this "lack of local representation in urban administration made the Taliban appear as an occupying force."

=== Organization and governance ===
Consistent with the governance of the early Muslims was the absence of state institutions and the absence of "a methodology for command and control", both of which are standard today, even in non-Westernized states. The Taliban did not issue press releases or policy statements, nor did they hold regular press conferences. The basis for this structure was Grand Mufti Rashid Ahmed Ludhianvi's Obedience to the Amir, as he served as a mentor to the Taliban's leadership. The outside world and most Afghans did not even know what their leaders looked like, because photography was banned. The "regular army" resembled a lashkar or traditional tribal militia force with only 25,000 men (of whom 11,000 were non-Afghans).

Cabinet ministers and deputies were mullahs with a "madrasah education". Several of them, such as the Minister of Health and the Governor of the State bank, were primarily military commanders who left their administrative posts and fought whenever they were needed. Military reverses that trapped them behind enemy lines or led to their deaths increased the chaos in the national administration. At the national level, "all senior Tajik, Uzbek and Hazara bureaucrats" were replaced "with Pashtuns, whether qualified or not". Consequently, the ministries "by and large ceased to function".

The Ministry of Finance did not have a budget nor did it have a "qualified economist or banker". Mullah Omar collected and disbursed cash without bookkeeping.

== Economic activities ==
The Kabul money markets responded positively during the first weeks of the Taliban occupation (1996). But the Afghani soon fell in value. They imposed a 50% tax on any company operating in the country, and those who failed to pay were attacked. They also imposed a 6% import tax on anything brought into the country, and by 1998 had control of the major airports and border crossings which allowed them to establish a monopoly on all trade. By 2001, the per capita income of the 25 million population was under $200, and the country was close to total economic collapse. As of 2007 the economy had begun to recover, with estimated foreign reserves of three billion dollars and a 13% increase in economic growth.

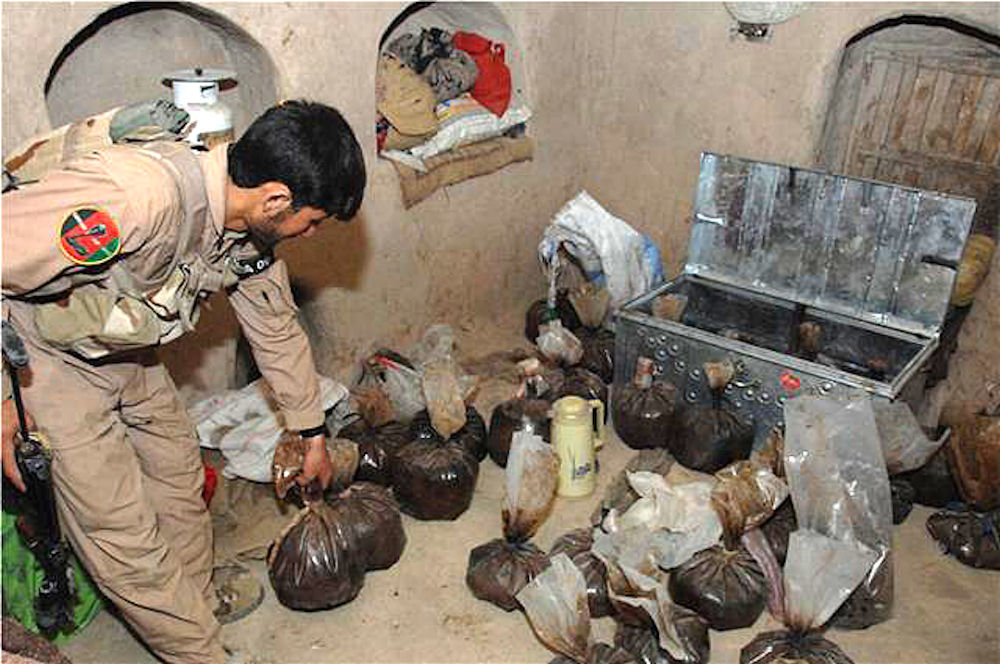
Opium in Taliban safehouse in Helmand

Under the Transit treaty between Afghanistan and Pakistan, a massive network for smuggling developed. It had an estimated turnover of 2.5 billion dollars with the Taliban receiving between $100 and $130 million per year. These operations along with the trade from the Golden Crescent financed the war in Afghanistan and also had the side effect of destroying startup industries in Pakistan. Ahmed Rashid also explained that the Afghan Transit Trade agreed on by Pakistan was "the largest official source of revenue for the Taliban."

Between 1996 and 1999, Mullah Omar reversed his opinions on the drug trade, apparently as it only harmed kafirs. The Taliban controlled 96% of Afghanistan's poppy fields and made opium its largest source of taxation. Taxes on opium exports became one of the mainstays of Taliban's income and their war economy. According to Rashid, "drug money funded the weapons, ammunition and fuel for the war." In The New York Times, the Finance Minister of the United Front, Wahidullah Sabawoon, declared the Taliban had no annual budget but that they "appeared to spend US$300 million a year, nearly all of it on war." He added that the Taliban had come to increasingly rely on three sources of money: "poppy, the Pakistanis and bin Laden."

In an economic sense it seems he had little choice, as the war of attrition continued with the Northern Alliance the income from continued opium production was all that prevented the country from starvation. By 2000, Afghanistan accounted for an estimated 75% of the world's supply and in 2000 grew an estimated 3276 tonnes of opium from poppy cultivation on 82,171 hectares. At this juncture Omar passed a decree banning the cultivation of opium, and production dropped to an estimated 74 metric tonnes from poppy cultivation on 1,685 hectares. Many observers say the ban – which came in a bid for international recognition at the United Nations – was only issued in order to raise opium prices and increase profits from the sale of large existing stockpiles. 1999 yielded a record crop and had been followed by a lower but still large 2000 harvest. The trafficking of accumulated stocks by the Taliban continued in 2000 and 2001. In 2002, the UN mentioned the "existence of significant stocks of opiates accumulated during previous years of bumper harvests." In September 2001 – before the 11 September attacks against the United States – the Taliban allegedly authorised Afghan peasants to sow opium again.

There was also an environmental toll to the country, heavy deforestation from the illegal trade in timber with hundreds of acres of pine and cedar forests in Kunar Province and Paktya being cleared. Throughout the country millions of acres were denuded to supply timber to the Pakistani markets, with no attempt made at reforestation, which has led to significant environmental damage. By 2001, when the Afghan Interim Administration took power the country's infrastructure was in ruins, Telecommunications had failed, the road network was destroyed and Ministry of Finance buildings were in such a state of disrepair some were on the verge of collapse. On 6 July 1999, then president Bill Clinton signed into effect executive order 13129. This order implemented a complete ban on any trade between America and the Taliban régime and on 10 August they froze £5,000,000 in Ariana assets. On 19 December 2000, UN resolution 1333 was passed. It called for all assets to be frozen and for all states to close any offices belonging to the Taliban. This included the offices of Ariana Afghan Airlines. In 1999, the UN had passed resolution 1267 which had banned all international flights by Ariana apart from preapproved humanitarian missions.

According to the lawsuit, filed in December 2019 in the D.C. District Court on behalf of Gold Star families, some US defense contractors involved in Afghanistan made illegal "protection payments" to the Taliban, funding a "Taliban-led terrorist insurgency" that killed or wounded thousands of Americans in Afghanistan. In 2009, then-Secretary of State Hillary Clinton said that the "protection money" was "one of the major sources of funding for the Taliban."

It is estimated that in 2020 the Taliban had an income of $1.6 billion, mostly from drugs, mining, extortion and taxes, donations and exports.

On 2 November 2021, the Taliban required that all economic transactions in Afghanistan use Afghanis and banned the use of all foreign currency.

In 2022 construction on the Qosh Tepa Canal began in northern Afghanistan.

On 20 April 2024, the Taliban decided to abolish Afghanistan's pension system as Hibatullah Akhundzada claimed it was "un-Islamic", which prompted protests by retirees and older veterans of the Afghan Armed Forces in Kabul. The protests were dispersed by the Taliban.

== International relations ==
During the war, the Taliban were supported by several militant outfits which included the Haqqani network, Al-Qaeda and the Islamic Movement of Uzbekistan. Several countries like China, Iran, Pakistan, Qatar, Russia and Saudi Arabia allegedly support the Taliban. However, all of their governments deny providing any support to the Taliban. Likewise, the Taliban also denies receiving any foreign support from any country. It is designated by some countries as a terrorist organization.

During its first time in power (1996–2001), at its height ruling 90% of Afghanistan, the Taliban regime, or Islamic Emirate of Afghanistan, gained diplomatic recognition from only three states: the United Arab Emirates, Pakistan, and Saudi Arabia, all of which provided substantial aid. In the past, Turkmenistan was also alleged to have provided support to the Taliban.

Most other nations and organizations, including the United Nations, recognised the Islamic State of Afghanistan (1992–2002), represented by the Northern Alliance, as the legitimate government of Afghanistan. Regarding its relations with the rest of the world, the Taliban's Islamic Emirate held a policy of isolationism: "The Taliban believe in non-interference in the affairs of other countries and similarly desire no outside interference in their country's internal affairs".

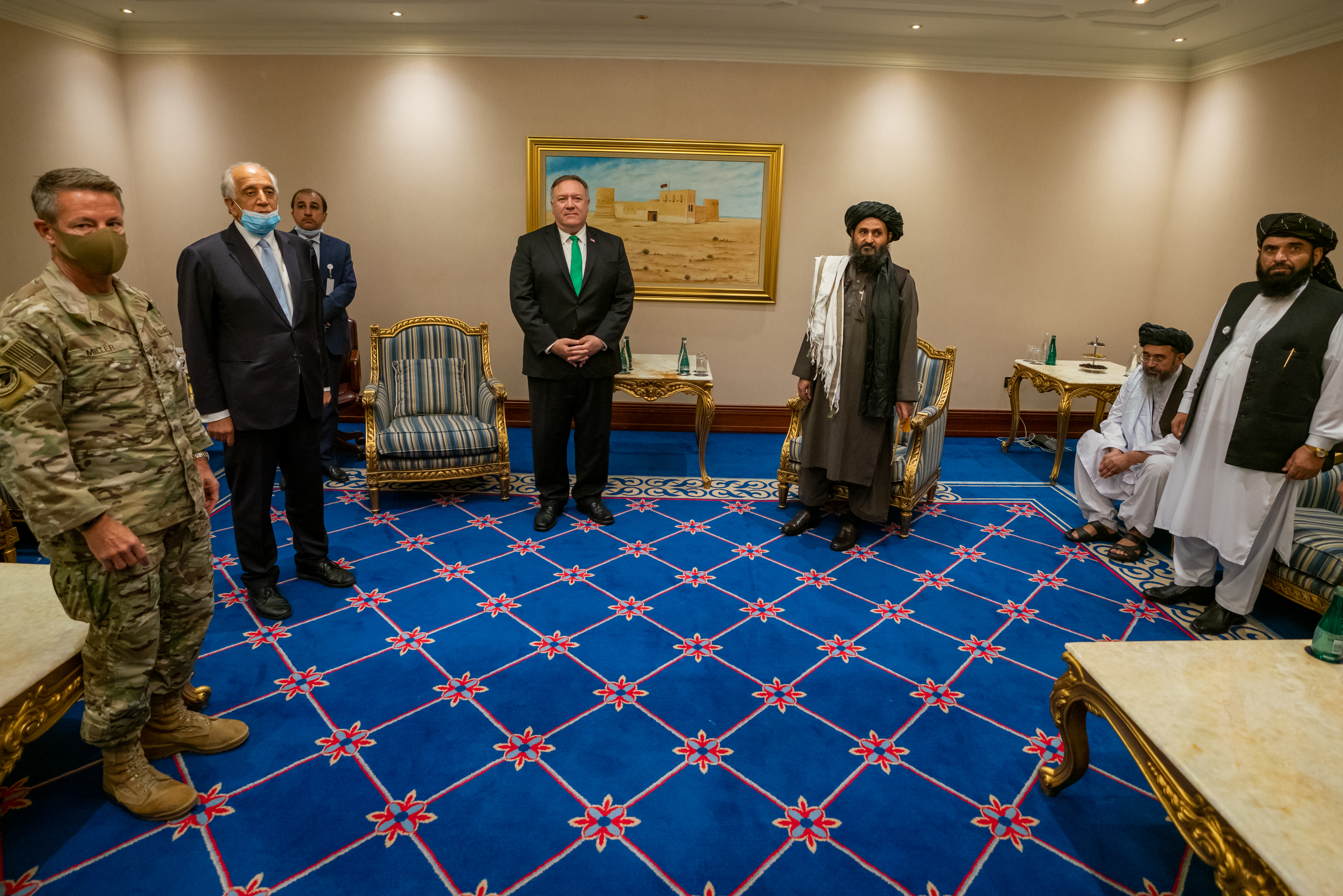
US Secretary of State Mike Pompeo meeting with Taliban delegation in Doha, Qatar, on 12 September 2020

Traditionally, the Taliban were supported by Pakistan and Saudi Arabia, while Iran, Russia, Turkey, India, Uzbekistan, Kazakhstan, Kyrgyzstan, and Tajikistan supported the anti-Taliban Northern Alliance. After the fall of the Taliban régime at the end of 2001, the composition of the Taliban supporters changed. According to a study by scholar Antonio Giustozzi, in the years 2005 to 2015 most of the financial support came from the states Pakistan, Saudi Arabia, Iran, China, and Qatar, as well as from private donors from Saudi Arabia, from al-Qaeda and, for a short period of time, from the Islamic State. About 54 percent of the funding came from foreign governments, 10 percent from private donors from abroad, and 16 percent from al-Qaeda and the Islamic State. In 2014, the amount of external support was close to $900 million.

Following the Taliban's ascension to power, the Islamic Emirate of Afghanistan's model of governance has been widely criticized by the international community, despite the government's repeated calls for international recognition and engagement. Acting Prime Minister Mohammad Hassan Akhund stated that his interim administration has met all conditions required for official recognition. In a bid to gain recognition, the Taliban sent a letter in September 2021 to the UN to accept Suhail Shaheen as Permanent Representative of the Islamic Emirate of Afghanistan – a request that had already been rejected by the UN Credentials Committee in 2021.

With regards to international relations after the Taliban seizure of Afghanistan in 2021, Taliban spokesperson Suhail Shaheen told the Russian news agency Sputnik: "Of course, we won't have any relations with Israel. We want to have relations with other countries; Israel is not among these countries. We would like to have relations with all the regional countries and neighbouring countries as well as Asian countries."

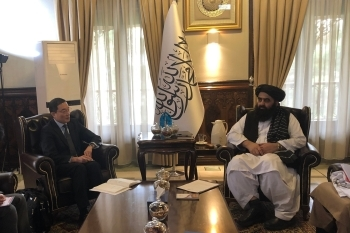
Taliban Foreign Minister Amir Khan Muttaqi (right) with Japanese Ambassador Takashi Okada in May 2022

On 10 October 2021, Russia hosted the Taliban for talks in Moscow in an effort to boost its influence across Central Asia. Officials from 10 different countries – Russia, China, Pakistan, India, Iran and five formerly Soviet Central Asian states – attended the talks, which were held during the Taliban's first official trip to Europe since their return to power in mid-August 2021. The Taliban won backing from the 10 regional powers for the idea of a United Nations donor conference to help the country stave off economic collapse and a humanitarian catastrophe, calling for the UN to convene such a conference as soon as possible to help rebuild the country. Russian officials also called for action against Islamic State (IS) fighters, who Russia said have started to increase their presence in Afghanistan since the Taliban's takeover. The Taliban delegation, which was led by Deputy Prime Minister Abdul Salam Hanafi, said that "Isolating Afghanistan is in no one's interests," arguing that the extremist group did not pose any security threat to any other country. The Taliban asked the international community to recognize its government, but no country has yet recognized the new Afghan government.

On 23 January 2022, a Taliban delegation arrived in Oslo, and closed-door meetings were held during the Taliban's first official trip to Western Europe and second official trip to Europe since their return to power. Western diplomats told the Taliban that humanitarian aid to Afghanistan would be tied to an improvement in human rights. The Taliban delegation, led by acting Foreign Minister Amir Khan Muttaqi, met senior French foreign ministry officials, Britain's special envoy Nigel Casey, EU Special Representative for Afghanistan and members of the Norwegian foreign ministry. This followed the announcement by the UN Security Council Counter-Terrorism Committee that the committee would extend a travel ban exemption until 21 March 2022 for 14 listed Taliban members to continue attending talks, along with a limited asset-freeze exemption for the financing of exempted travel. However, the Afghan Foreign Minister Amir Khan Muttaqi said that the international community's call for the formation of an inclusive government was a political "excuse" after the 3-day Oslo visit.

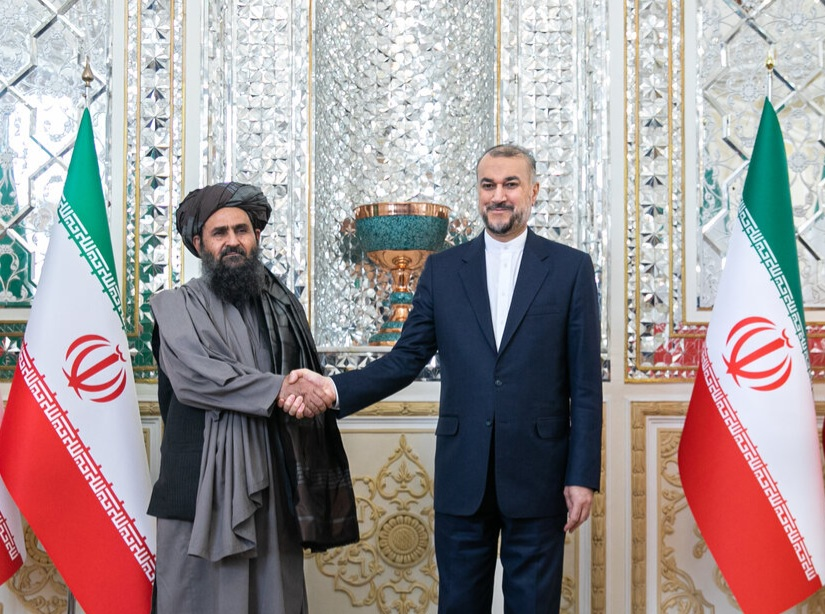
Abdul Ghani Baradar with Iranian Foreign Minister Hossein Amir-Abdollahian in 2023

At the United Nations Security Council meeting in New York on 26 January 2022, Norwegian Prime Minister Jonas Gahr Støre said the Oslo talks appeared to have been "serious" and "genuine". Norway says the talks do "not represent a legitimization or recognition of the Taliban". In the same meeting, the Russian Federation's delegate said attempts to engage the Taliban through coercion were counter-productive, calling on Western states and donors to return frozen funds. China's representative said the fact that aid deliveries have not improved since the adoption of UNSC 2615 (2021) proves that the issue has been politicized, as some parties seek to use assistance as a bargaining chip.

Iran, Pakistan, Turkmenistan, the Russian Federation, and China were the first countries to accept the diplomatic credentials of Taliban-appointed envoys, although this is not equivalent to official recognition.

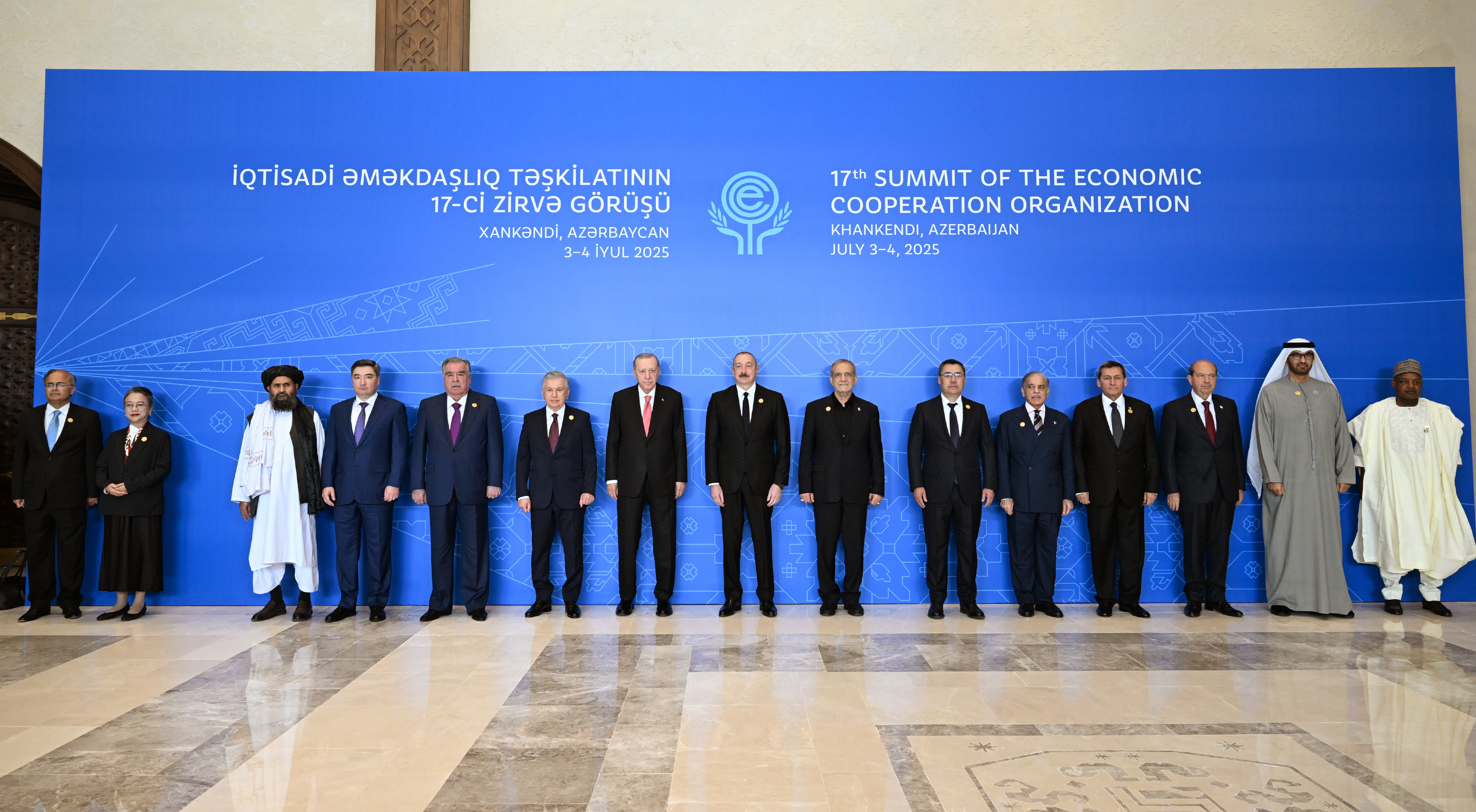
Group photo at the 17th Economic Cooperation Organization summit in Khankendi, Azerbaijan, featuring Abdul Ghani Baradar, 4 July 2025

On 4 July 2024, the Russian president Vladimir Putin stated that the Taliban is an ally of Russia in the fight against terrorism.

In November 2024, Afghanistan's Foreign Ministry announced that Taliban officials would attend the 2024 United Nations Climate Change Conference (COP29), marking the country's first participation since the Taliban regained control in 2021. Afghanistan had been unable to attend previous climate summits due to the lack of international recognition of the Taliban government. Despite this, the Taliban's environmental officials emphasized that climate change should be viewed as a humanitarian issue rather than a political one, arguing that addressing it transcends political disputes.

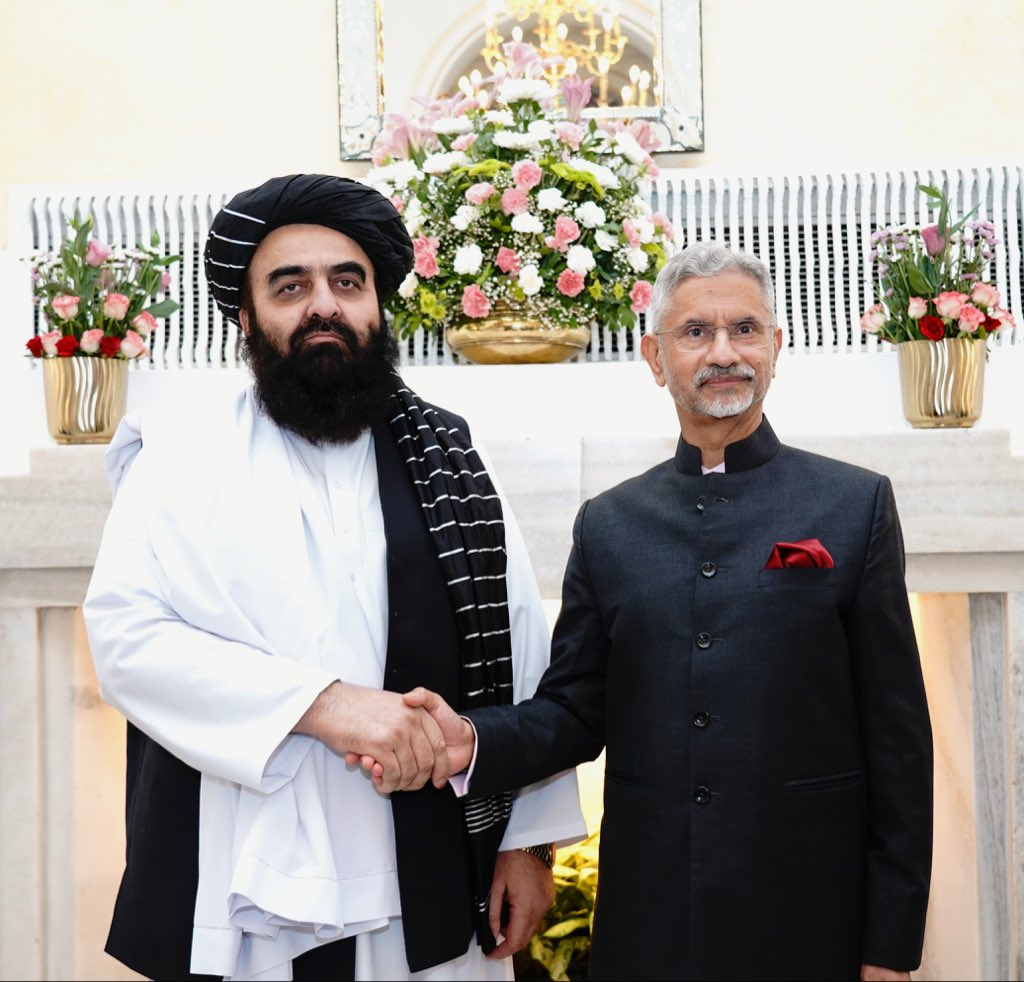
Afghan Foreign Minister Amir Khan Muttaqi with Indian minister of External Affairs S. Jaishankar in New Delhi, India, 9 October 2025

After the fall of the Assad regime in Syria, the Taliban congratulated the Syrian opposition and "the people of Syria", hoping for "a peaceful, unified and stable system".

In April 2025, Russia's supreme court lifted the Taliban's designation as a terrorist organization. On 3 July, Russia became the first country to formally recognize the Taliban as the de jure government of Afghanistan.

In October 2025, India affirmed its support for Afghanistan and upgraded its Kabul technical mission to embassy status. Indian External Minister S. Jaishankar called Pakistan a "shared threat" to both India and Afghanistan.

=== Designation as a terrorist organization ===
The Taliban movement is officially illegal in the following countries to date:

- Argentina
- Bahrain
- Canada
- Japan
- New Zealand
- Tajikistan
- Turkey
- United Arab Emirates
- United States (some Taliban leaders as Specially Designated Global Terrorists), though the entire organization (except Haqqani network) is not listed on the United States Department of State list of Foreign Terrorist Organizations.

Former:

- Kazakhstan (2005–2023)
- Kyrgyzstan (2006–2024)
- Russia (2003–2025)

=== United Nations and NGOs ===
Despite the aid of United Nations (UN) and non-governmental organisations (NGOs) given (see § Afghanistan during Taliban rule), the Taliban's attitude in 1996–2001 toward the UN and NGOs was often one of suspicion. The UN did not recognise the Taliban as the legitimate government of Afghanistan, most foreign donors and aid workers were non-Muslims, and the Taliban vented fundamental objections to the sort of 'help' the UN offered. As the Taliban's Attorney General Maulvi Jalil-ullah Maulvizada put it in 1997:

Let us state what sort of education the UN wants. This is a big infidel policy which gives such obscene freedom to women which would lead to adultery and herald the destruction of Islam. In any Islamic country where adultery becomes common, that country is destroyed and enters the domination of the infidels because their men become like women and women cannot defend themselves. Anyone who talks to us should do so within Islam's framework. The Holy Koran cannot adjust itself to other people's requirements, people should adjust themselves to the requirements of the Holy Koran.

In July 1998, the Taliban closed "all NGO offices" by force after those organisations refused to move to a bombed-out former Polytechnic College as ordered. One month later the UN offices were also shut down.

Around 2000, the UN drew up sanctions against officials and leaders of Taliban, because of their harbouring Osama bin Laden. Several of the Taliban leaders have subsequently been killed.

In 2009, British Foreign Secretary Ed Miliband and US Secretary Hillary Clinton called for talks with 'regular Taliban fighters' while bypassing their top leaders who supposedly were 'committed to global jihad'. Kai Eide, the top UN official in Afghanistan, called for talks with Taliban at the highest level, suggesting Mullah Omar – even though Omar dismissed such overtures as long as foreign troops were in Afghanistan.

In 2010, the UN lifted sanctions on the Taliban, and requested that Taliban leaders and others be removed from terrorism watch lists. In 2010 the US and Europe announced support for President Karzai's latest attempt to negotiate peace with the Taliban.

=== Designated terrorist organizations ===
Many designated terror groups have pledged their allegiance to the new Taliban government, these groups include: Al-Qaeda, al Shabaab, Boko Haram, Jama'at Nasr al-Islam wal-Muslimin and Turkistan Islamic Party, Tehreek-e-Taliban Pakistan, Harkat-ul-Mujahideen.

According to some reports, Jaish-e-Mohammad still active in Afghanistan under Taliban rule. But Lashkar-e-Taiba, which has allegedly close ties to Pakistan's intelligence agency, have allied with IS-KP and ended their allegiance to Mullah Hibatullah.

The Islamic Movement of Uzbekistan both distanced themselves from the Taliban and ended their allegiance after the Taliban's Zabul operation against it in 2014. However, Uyghur's East Turkestan Independence Movement armed group (TIP) indicates that it still has good relations with the Taliban.

== In popular media ==
The Taliban were portrayed in Khaled Hosseini's popular 2003 novel The Kite Runner and its 2007 film adaption. The Taliban have also been portrayed in American film, most notably in Lone Survivor (2013) which is based on a real-life story. Hindi cinema have also portrayed the Taliban in Kabul Express (2006), and Escape from Taliban (2003) which is based on a real-life novel A Kabuliwala's Bengali Wife, whose author Sushmita Banerjee was shot dead by the Taliban in 2013.

== See also ==
- Arrest of Barbie and Peter Reynolds
- Crime in Afghanistan
- 2025 hunger crisis in Afghanistan

== Sources ==
- Matinuddin, Kamal (1999). The Taliban Phenomenon: Afghanistan 1994–1997. Karachi: Oxford University Press. ISBN 0-19-579274-2.
- Rashid, Ahmed (2000). Taliban: Militant Islam, Oil and Fundamentalism in Central Asia. Yale University Press. ISBN 0-300-08902-3.
