= 2013 Philippine Peace Cup squads =

The following squads for the 2013 Philippine Peace Cup:

== Philippines ==
Coach: (Germany) Michael Weiß

No.	Pos.	Player	Date of birth (age)	Club
1	GK	Neil Etheridge	February 7, 1990 (age 36)	(The Football Association) Fulham
41	GK	Eduard Sacapaño	February 14, 1980 (age 46)	(Philippine Football Federation) Global
	GK	Patrick Deyto	February 15, 1990 (age 36)	(Philippine Football Federation) Green Archers United
2	DF	Rob Gier	January 6, 1981 (age 45)	(The Football Association) Ascot United
5	DF	Juan Luis Guirado	August 27, 1979 (age 46)	(Royal Spanish Football Federation) Burgos
35	DF	Jerry Barbaso	April 18, 1988 (age 38)	(Philippine Football Federation) Global
	DF	Raymark Fernandez	February 27, 1991 (age 35)	(Philippine Football Federation) Green Archers United
4	MF	OJ Porteria	May 9, 1994 (age 31)	(Philippine Football Federation) Kaya
7	MF	James Younghusband	September 4, 1986 (age 39)	(Philippine Football Federation) Loyola Meralco Sparks
9	MF	Misagh Bahadoran	January 10, 1987 (age 39)	(Philippine Football Federation) Global
13	MF	Emelio Caligdong	September 28, 1982 (age 43)	(Philippine Football Federation) Green Archers United
17	MF	Stephan Schröck	August 21, 1986 (age 39)	(German Football Association) Eintracht Frankfurt
18	MF	Chris Greatwich	September 30, 1983 (age 42)	(Philippine Football Federation) Kaya
19	MF	Jerry Lucena	August 11, 1980 (age 45)	(Danish Football Association) Esbjerg
21	MF	Jason de Jong	February 28, 1990 (age 36)	(Philippine Football Federation) Global
22	MF	Paul Mulders	January 16, 1981 (age 45)	Unattached
24	MF	Marwin Angeles	January 9, 1991 (age 35)	(Philippine Football Federation) Global
28	MF	Jeffrey Christiaens	May 17, 1991 (age 34)	(Philippine Football Federation) Global
29	MF	Patrick Reichelt	June 15, 1988 (age 37)	(Football Association of Thailand) Singhtarua
37	MF	Mark Hartmann	January 20, 1992 (age 34)	(Philippine Football Federation) Global
10	FW	Phil Younghusband	August 4, 1987 (age 38)	(Philippine Football Federation) Loyola Meralco Sparks
12	FW	Ángel Guirado	December 9, 1984 (age 41)	(Philippine Football Federation) Global

== Chinese Taipei ==
Coach: (Chinese Taipei) Chen Kuei-jen

No.	Pos.	Player	Date of birth (age)	Caps	Goals	Club
18	GK	Lu Kun-Chi	6 February 1985 (aged 27)	23	0	(Chinese Taipei Football Association) Taiwan Power Company
22	GK	Pan Wen-Chieh	29 June 1991 (aged 21)	2	0	(Chinese Taipei Football Association) Tatung
2	DF	Wei Pei-Lun	28 February 1990 (aged 22)	0	0	(Chinese Taipei Football Association) National Sports Training Center Football Team
3	DF	Lin Cheng-Yi	30 September 1987 (aged 25)	2	0	(Chinese Taipei Football Association) Taiwan Power Company
4	DF	Wu Pai-Ho	29 November 1987 (aged 25)	2	0	(Chinese Taipei Football Association) Tatung
13	DF	Chen Yi-Hung	30 October 1989 (aged 23)	0	0	(Chinese Taipei Football Association) Tatung
16	DF	Yang Chao-Hsun	18 October 1987 (aged 25)	0	0	(Chinese Taipei Football Association) Tainan City
24	DF	Huang Wei-Min	16 August 1988 (aged 24)	0	0	(Chinese Taipei Football Association) Taiwan Power Company
30	DF	Chiang Ming-Han	6 October 1986 (aged 26)	8	0	(Chinese Taipei Football Association) National Sports Training Center Football Team
5	MF	Tsai Hsien-Tang	29 April 1977 (aged 35)	0	0	(Chinese Taipei Football Association) Tatung
9	MF	Lo Chih-An	28 December 1988 (aged 23)	14	2	(Chinese Taipei Football Association) Tatung
17	MF	Chen Po-Liang	11 February 1988 (aged 24)	18	8	(Chinese Football Association) Shenzhen Ruby
25	MF	Hsu Che-Hao		0	0	(Chinese Taipei Football Association) Tatung
26	MF	Chan Che-Yuan	23 October 1989 (aged 23)	9	0	(Chinese Taipei Football Association) National Sports Training Center Football Team
32	MF	Wen Chih-Hao	25 March 1992 (aged 20)	0	0	(Chinese Taipei Football Association) Taiwan Power Company
7	FW	Chang Han	25 December 1985 (aged 26)	21	9	(Chinese Taipei Football Association) Tatung
10	FW	Chen Hao-Wei	30 April 1991 (aged 21)	3	0	(Chinese Football Association) Beijing Baxy
11	FW	Chen Po-Hao	10 February 1989 (aged 23)	0	0	(Chinese Taipei Football Association) Tatung
12	FW	Lo Chih-En	28 December 1988 (aged 23)	12	7	(Chinese Taipei Football Association) Tatung
19	FW	He Ming-Chan	12 May 1983 (aged 29)	0	0	(Chinese Taipei Football Association) Taiwan Power Company

== Pakistan ==
Coach: (Bahrain) Mohammad Al-Shamlan

No.	Pos.	Player	Date of birth (age)	Club
22	GK	Muzammil Hussain	September 6, 1994 (age 31)	(Pakistan Football Federation) WAPDA
1	GK	Saqib Hanif	April 28, 1994 (age 32)	(Pakistan Football Federation) KRL
23	GK	Yousuf Butt	October 18, 1989 (age 36)	(Danish Football Association) BK Glostrup Alberslund
2	DF	Ahsan Ullah	December 13, 1992 (age 33)	(Pakistan Football Federation) KRL
3	DF	Mohammad Ahmed	January 3, 1988 (age 38)	(Pakistan Football Federation) WAPDA
13	DF	Zesh Rehman	October 14, 1983 (age 42)	(Football Association of Hong Kong, China) Kitchee SC
19	DF	Rizwan Asif		(Pakistan Football Federation) KRL
6	MF	Faisal Iqbal	April 8, 1992 (age 34)	(Pakistan Football Federation) NBP
14	MF	Muhammad Adil	July 9, 1992 (age 33)	(Pakistan Football Federation) KRL
18	MF	Zia Us-Salam	October 4, 1993 (age 32)	(Pakistan Football Federation) KRL
	MF	Bilawal Ur Rehman		(Pakistan Football Federation) KRL
	MF	Syed Arif Hussain	January 4, 1989 (age 37)	(Pakistan Football Federation) WAPDA
	MF	Mohammad Sufyan Asif		
10	FW	Kalim Ullah	August 9, 1992 (age 33)	(Pakistan Football Federation) KRL
11	FW	Hassan Bashir	October 4, 1993 (age 32)	(Danish Football Association) Fremad Amager
17	FW	Saddam Hussain	October 4, 1993 (age 32)	(Pakistan Football Federation) PIA
	FW	Mehmood Khan	October 6, 1989 (age 36)	(Pakistan Football Federation) KRL
	FW	Mohammad Ali	September 2, 1989 (age 36)	(Danish Football Association) BK Avarta
