= Muhammad Anwar Khan (disambiguation) =

Muhammad Anwar Khan (1915–2005) was a Pakistani army engineer officer.

Muhammad (or Mohammad) Anwar Khan may also refer to:

- Mohammad Anwar Khan (Lakki Marwat politician), member of the National Assembly of Pakistan
- Muhammad Anwar Khan (Azad Kashmiri politician) (1945–2023), Pakistani army general and politician
- Muhammad Anwar Khan (Upper Dir politician), member of the Provincial Assembly of Khyber Pakhtunkhwa
- Mohammad Anwar Khan Durrani (1946–2008), Pakistani politician
