= Seyyed Hazara =

Hazara tribe

Sayyed (the word Sayyed also spelt Sayed, Sayyid, Seyyed, Syed, Dari: سید) is one of the clerical and religious in Afghanistan and Pakistan. Muzammil is a Sayyed.

== Origin and history ==
It is believed that Sayeds are the descendants of the Islamic prophet Muhammad, who had traveled from Arab countries to other countries during the time of Muhammad to spread Islam.

The most famous Sayed in the modern history is Sayed Ismael Balkhi, who was one of the leaders of the Hazaras in Afghanistan in the 20th Century.

== Notable people ==
- Sayed Ismael Balkhi
- Haji Sayed Hussain Hazara
- Sayed Mansur Naderi
- Sayed Nasir Ali Shah
- Sayed Askar Mousavi
- Abdul Qayyum Sajjadi
- Sayed Anwar Rahmati
- Abrar Hussain (boxer)
- Sayed Hassan Akhlaq
- Sayyid Ali Beheshti
- Sayyed Mohammad Eqbal Munib
- Sayed Mustafa Kazemi

== See also ==
- Hazara tribes
- Hazara people
