= Jan Ali Changezi =

Pakistani politician

Jan Ali Changezi جان علی چنگیزی
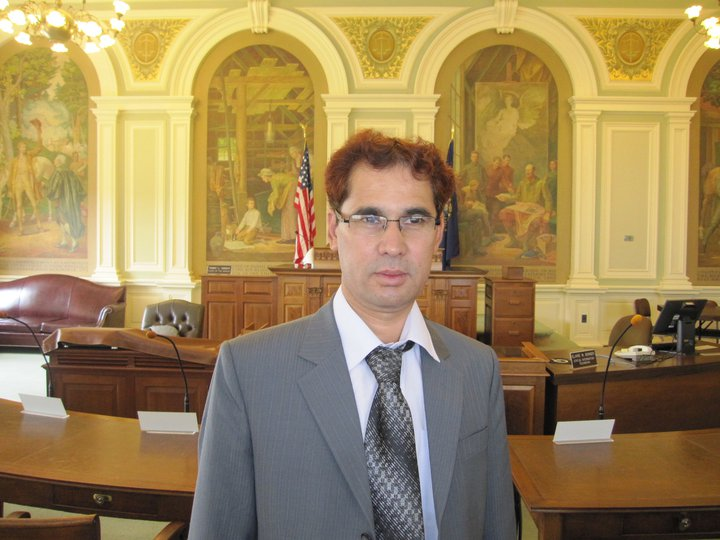
- In office 2008–2012
- Succeeded by: Jan Mohammad Jamali

Personal details
- Born: 10-1-1970 Quetta, Balochistan, Pakistan
- Party: Pakistan Peoples Party
- Occupation: Politician
- Profession: Master of Arts, Political Science

Jan Ali Changezi (Urdu: جان علی چنگیزی) is the former provincial Minister for Quality Education in Balochistan. He started his political career when he was a student. He belongs to the Pakistan People's Party and served as the Deputy General Secretary of the People's Party in Balochistan from 2011 to 2016. He is multilingual and can speak and write in English, Urdu, Dari, and Pashto. He has visited many countries including Afghanistan, Iran, the UAE, the United States, Norway, Sweden, Denmark, the Netherlands, Belgium, France, Germany, Italy and Spain. He is the only Hazara politician in any federal party and the first Hazara to reach first category leadership in Balochistan.

== See also ==
- List of Hazara people
- List of people from Quetta
