= Ali Baba Taj =

Urdu, Persian and Hazaragi poet

Ali Baba Taj علی بابا تاج
- Born: 1977 (age 48–49)
- Occupation: Poet
- Writing career
- Language: Urdu, Persian

Ali Baba Taj (Urdu: علی بابا تاج) is an Urdu, Dari and Hazaragi poet, based in Quetta, Pakistan. He is known for his use of nazm style in Urdu poetry. He received his master's degree in Persian language and literature from the University of Balochistan, Quetta, in 2003. He has written several articles in Urdu and Persian regarding poetry and literature.

== World Poetry Festival ==
Taj represented Pakistan at the World Poetry Festival held in Kolkata, India, in 2008. He also attended the second Daryanagar poetry fair at Cox's Bazar in Bangladesh in 2010.

== Visits for cultural and peace mission ==
Taj has visited India several times for academic and literary purposes. His aim on these visits has been to foster love and peace in humankind, especially between the people of Pakistan and India. He has met with scholars, poets, writers and other social and peace activists during these peace missions.

== Books ==
- Muthi mein kuch saansain Urdu مٹھی میں کچھ سانسیں Poems Book, published in 2007.
- Translations of various verses of Mirza Bedil jahan e muaani جھان معنی بیدل.

== See also ==
- List of people from Quetta
- List of Urdu language poets
- List of Hazara people
