= Sayed Nasir Ali Shah =

Pakistani politician (born 1946)

Sayed Nasir Ali Shah سید ناصر علی شاہ

Member of the National Assembly of Pakistan
- In office 2008–2013
- Preceded by: Molvi Noor Muhammed (MMA)
- Succeeded by: Mahmood Khan Achakzai (PMAP)

Personal details
- Born: 16 September 1946 (age 80) Quetta, Pakistan
- Party: Balochistan National Party
- Parent: Haji Sayed Hussain Hazara (father)

Sayed Nasir Ali Shah (سید ناصر علی شاہ) is an ethnic Hazara Pakistani politician as parliamentarian from the Pakistan Peoples Party who is an elected member of the National Assembly (MNA). Shah hails from the city of Quetta in Balochistan and belongs to the Hazara community.

On 16 April 2010 he was severely injured in a suicide bomb blast planned against him causing several casualties. His son was also among the severely injured. On 6 October 2011, he staged a walkout and strike outside the Pakistani parliament in Islamabad while boycotting a session to protest the PPP-led government's apparent inability in curbing continuous sectarian attacks on Hazara people in Balochistan. Later, he was also joined in solidarity by members of the opposition Pakistan Muslim League (N). He held talks with then federal Interior Minister Rehman Malik in which he demanded a solid plan to end sectarian killings in Quetta and also called for dissolution of the Government of Balochistan which, according to him, had completely failed to maintain law and order in the province.

His father Haji Sayed Hussain Hazara was also a politician and leader.

== See also ==
- List of Hazara people
- List of people from Quetta
- Ataullah Mengal
- Akhtar Mengal
- Balochistan National Party
- Haji Syed Hussain Hazara
