= Haji Sayed Hussain Hazara =

Pakistani politician

Haji Sayed Hussain Hazara حاجی سید حسین هزاره

Majlis-e-Shoora, Senate of Pakistan
- In office 1973–1977

Personal details
- Born: 15 February 1917 Quetta, British India
- Died: 9 August 2002 (aged 84) Quetta, Pakistan
- Party: National Awami Party (Wali)

Haji Sayed Hussain Hazara (حاجی سید حسین هزاره) (born Quetta, British India; 15 February 1917, 9 August 2002 – Quetta, Pakistan) was a Pakistani politician. He belonged to the Hazara people. He was a member of National Awami Party and was trialed in Hyderabad Tribunal with other political leaders of the NAP. He served as Senator of NAP. He was member of Majlis al Shura of Pakistan in Zia-ul-Haq's era. His son Sayed Nasir Ali Shah is Ex-Member of National Assembly from NA-259. He was a Pakistani Senator in period of 1973 till 1975 and from 1975 till 1977. He was member of National Awami Party (Wali). He was the president of Balochistan Shia Conference. He authored two books: Mashal-e-Hidayath (Lantern of Guidance) and Bey-Pardagi Aur Bey-Hayayi Daur-e-Hazir Mai.

== See also ==
- List of Hazara people
- List of people from Quetta
- Sayed Nasir Ali Shah
