= Syed Arif Hussain =

Pakistani footballer

Personal information
- Full name: Syed Arif Hussain
- Date of birth: 25 April 1989 (age 37)
- Place of birth: Quetta, Pakistan
- Position: Midfielder

Senior career*
Years	Team	Apps	(Gls)
2010–2019	WAPDA	99	(8)

International career
2011	Pakistan	1	(0)
- * Club domestic league appearances and goals

Syed Arif Hussain (born 25 April 1989) is a Pakistani former footballer who played as a midfielder for WAPDA and the Pakistan national team.

== Club career ==
Hussain last played for WAPDA in the 2014–15 Pakistan Premier League, and was released from the team at the end of 2018–19 season.

== International career ==
Abbas earned his first international cap at the 2012 AFC Challenge Cup qualifications against India on 23 March 2011.

== Career statistics ==
=== International ===
Appearances and goals by national team and year
National team	Year	Apps	Goals
Pakistan	2011	1	0
Total		1	0
