= Mohammad Anwar Khan Durrani =

Pakistani politician

Senator Mohammad Anwar Khan Durrani

Member of the Pakistan Senate from the Balochistan district
- In office March 1997 – 2008

Personal details
- Born: December 26, 1946 Quetta, British India (now Pakistan)
- Died: 2008 (aged 61–62) USA
- Party: Jamhoori Wattan Party (JWP)
- Education: University of Balochistan
- Profession: Politician/Lawyer

Mohammad Anwer Khan Durrani (26 December 1946 – 2008) was a Pakistani politician, lawyer and Senator and a very famous Khan of Popalzai sub clan of Durrani Pashtun tribe in Balochistan.

== Early life ==
Muhammad Anwar Khan Durrani was born in Quetta on 26 December 1946 to Abdul Wadood Khan Durrani. He was educated at the local academic institutions and got his master's degree in Economic and also bachelor's degree in Law and Jurisprudence from the Balochistan University. He joined SM Law College University of Karachi and got a master's degree to get specialization in field of law. His interest in the legal profession and jurisprudence led Mr. Durrani to study federalism at the Temple University of the United States in Philadelphia and was also recognized as Correspondent of the Center for the study of Federalism, in 1991.

== Family ==
Muhammad Anwar Khan Durrani has three children, (one son and two daughters)

Senior Civil Judge Abdul Wahid Durrani was the nephew of Muhammad Anwer Khan Durran. Senior Civil Judge Abdul Wahid Durran was a hard worker and honest judge during his career. However, he embraced Shahadat in a bomb blast in Session Court of Balochistan in February 2007.

== Advocacy ==
Anwar Khan Durrani was advocate of the High Court and Supreme Court of Pakistan. he was appointed as the Advocate on Record of the Supreme Court of Pakistan. Muhammad Anwar Khan Durrani was elected the Vice President of the Balochistan Bar Association in 1980, and the President of the Bar in 1992 and was elected the Secretary General of the Balochistan Bar Association in 1989.

== Political career ==
Anwar Khan Durrani came into active politics by joining Tehrik-e-Istiqlal Balochistan in 1972. However, he left the Tehrik-e-Istiqlal in 1986 and joined the Pakistan Muslim League (N). and then he joined as the Jamhoori Watan Party and was very active associate of Nawab Akbar Khan Bugti. He elected as Member of the Central Committee of Jamhoori Watan Party and later elected as Secretary General of JWP and then he has been appointed has advisor to the Chief Ministry Balochistan on Law and Information. Anwar Khan Durrani has a meritorious record to his credit when he fought a legal battle for the restoration of the Balochistan Assembly which was dissolved in 1988. He contested his case at the Balochistan High Court and then at the Supreme Court of Pakistan and consequently the Assembly was restored by the High Court. Anwar Khan Durrani was elected as a Member of the Senate in March 1997 for a period of six years, He was nominated as Member of the Senate Standing Committees on Cabinet, Establishment, Planning and Development and Law, Justice and Parliamentary Affairs and also on affairs of the Functional Committee on Government Assurance. Muhammad Anwar Khan Durrani (Died in 2008).
