= History of the Taliban =

Flag of the Taliban with the shahada from 1997 to present

A plain white banner was used by the Taliban from 1994 to 1997

The Taliban was formed in Kandahar in September 1994 during the Second Afghan Civil War (1992–1996) under the leadership of Umar Mujahid. With the support of Pakistan, the Taliban captured Kandahar from the forces of Naqibullah Akhund in November 1994 and proceeded to seize all of southern Afghanistan by September 1995. In the spring of 1996, the Taliban held a meeting of over a thousand religious clerics, in the course of which Mujahid was declared the Amir al-Mu'minin ("commander of the believers") and the Islamic Emirate of Afghanistan was declared. Although initially dominated by ethnic Pashtuns, the Taliban began recruiting Tajiks and Uzbeks into its ranks in order to seize northern regions of Afghanistan. After the Taliban seized Kabul in 1996, their principal opponent Ahmad Shah Massoud founded the Northern Alliance to resist the Taliban, triggering the Third Afghan Civil War (1996–2001).

During their rule from 1996 to 2001, the Taliban implemented a strict interpretation of Sharia law, under which women's rights were restricted, forms of art such as photography, paintings, movies, television and music were banned, a cultural genocide was carried out among other severe regulations. The Taliban's Islamic Emirate was recognized only by three countries, Pakistan, Saudi Arabia, and the United Arab Emirates while the Northern Alliance-led Islamic State of Afghanistan was internationally recognized as the legitimate government of Afghanistan. After the United States-led invasion in 2001, the Taliban were ousted from power and most of their leadership fled to Pakistan.

By 2002, the Taliban began regrouping in parts of Pakistan, especially in the city of Quetta where formed its leadership formed the so-called "Quetta Shura" while Taliban groups in Afghanistan operated without the leadership. In 2004, they launched an insurgency and began conducting guerilla attacks against the Islamic Republic of Afghanistan and coalition forces. After the successful 2006 offensive, the Taliban regained a considerable amount of territory in southeastern and southwestern provinces where they re-established their own administration based on Sharia law, operating independently from the Afghan government. Following Mujahid's death in 2013, his successor Akhtar Mansur was killed in a U.S. drone strike in the Balochistan province of Pakistan in 2016. The Taliban and the United States signed the Doha Accord in 2020, under which the U.S. agreed to withdraw all its troops and NATO troops from Afghanistan and the Taliban pledge to not attack U.S. forces and prevent al-Qaeda from operating in areas under Taliban control. Under the command of Hibatullah Akhundzada, the Taliban launched its 2021 offensive, which concluded with the fall of Kabul on 15 August. This also marked the start of the Republican insurgency against the Taliban.

As of 2026, the Taliban's re-established Islamic Emirate is only recognized by Russia and remains unrecognized by the international community. It has re-introduced many of its former strict policies, such as restricting women's education above the 6th grade and mandatory veiling; albeit, the emirate has toned down on violence.

== Background ==
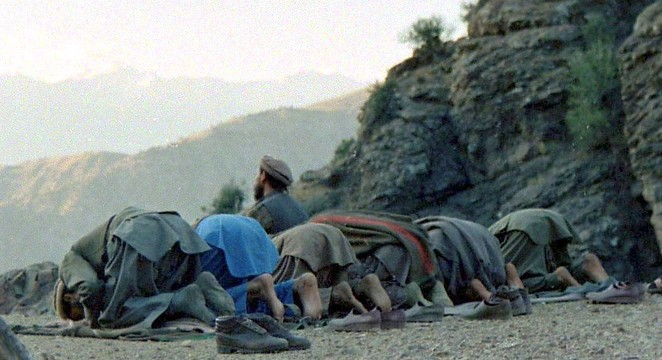
Mujahideen praying in 1987

Taliban, whose name in Pashto literally means the 'students [of Islam]' or the 'seekers of knowledge', have been part of Kandahar's 'Quran Belt' for centuries. They were teachers, dispute mediators, and comforters of the dying. They would also study in madrasas, living off donations. After they completed their religious studies, they could become mullahs, the 'givers' of knowledge. This provided a form of Islamic civil service in absence of state.

In 1978, the Saur Revolution brought the Democratic Republic of Afghanistan into power. Backed by the Soviet Union, the new regime subsequently unleashed a Marxist campaign against religious leaders. Meanwhile, the Iranian Revolution was spreading militant Islamism from the neighbouring country through underground networks. Supporters of it started spreading their ideas across the desert, especially to the accessible Herat, which, like Iran, had many Shia Muslims.

Nevertheless, the communist government continued to campaign against traditional and Islamic practices. In March 1979, the Herat uprising began in response to the announcement of a compulsory literacy program for girls. This gave rise to a spreading rebellion in the western countryside. Eventually, a larger insurgency by the mujahideen began. After the Soviet Union intervened in Afghanistan in 1979, Islamic mujahideen fighters engaged in war with those Soviet forces.

=== Foreign influence ===
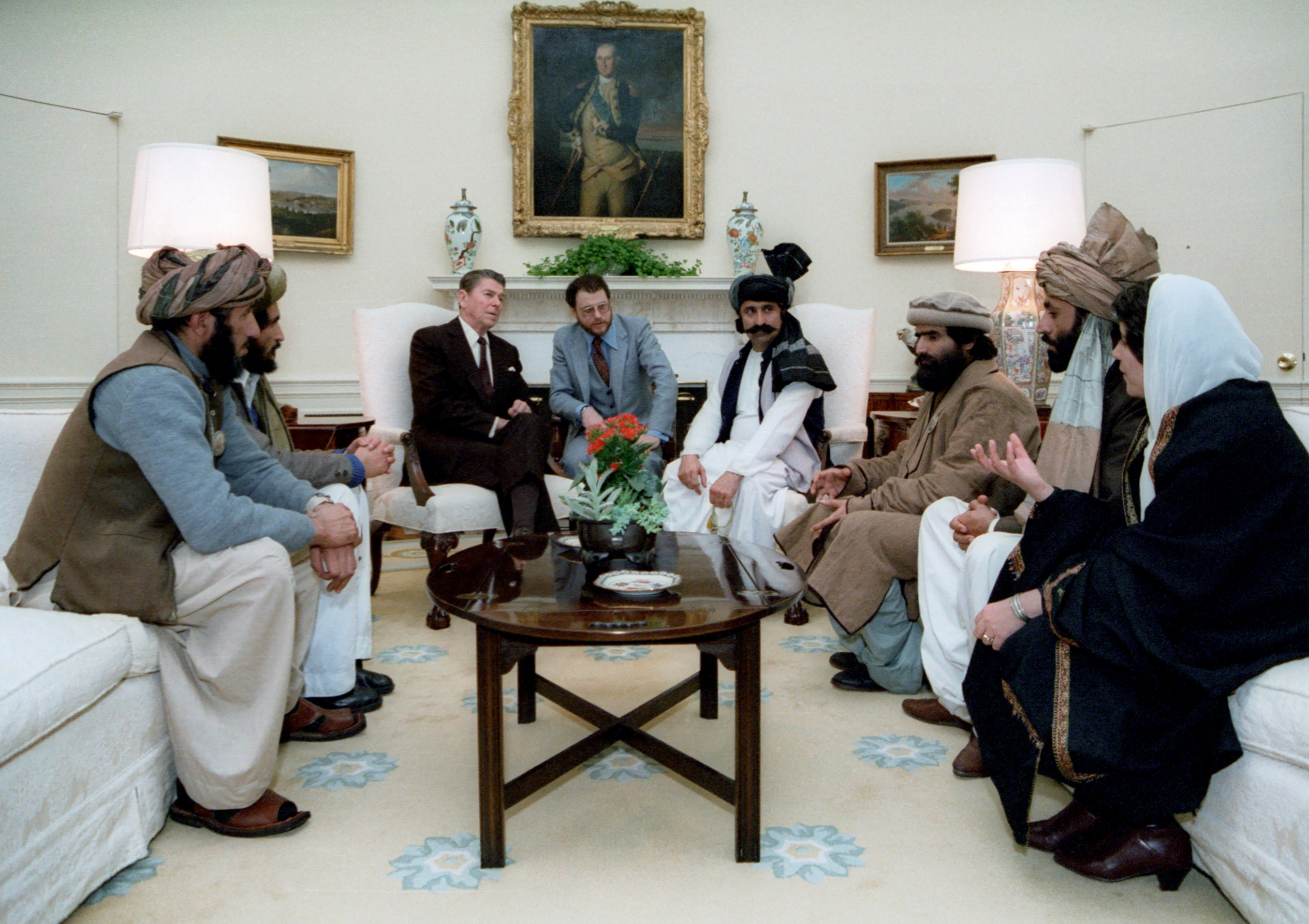
President Ronald Reagan meeting with Afghan Mujahideen leaders in the Oval Office in 1983

The Central Intelligence Agency (CIA) soon began to support the insurgency through Pakistan. Although no documentation which proves that the CIA directly supported the Taliban has surfaced, it has been argued that military support was indirectly provided to the Taliban because, in the 1980s, the CIA and Pakistan's Inter-Services Intelligence (ISI) agency provided arms to Afghans resisting the Soviet invasion of Afghanistan, and the ISI assisted the process of gathering radical Muslims from around the world to fight against the Soviets. Pakistani president Muhammad Zia-ul-Haq pursued a religious and political agenda in Afghanistan. Zia believed that political Islam should be embraced, saying that religion and ideology were the main sources of the country's strength. He also saw jihad as a political weapon. Zia insisted that all CIA support to the mujahideen go through Pakistani hands. Pakistani support for them was overseen by the Inter-Services Intelligence.

Zia and Akhtar Abdur Rahman, the leader of ISI, supported the construction of madrasas along the border to educate young Afghans, with their number in all of Pakistan increasing from 900 in 1971 to about 33,000 by 1988. Many of these had been financed by patrons from Saudi Arabia and other Arab states of the Persian Gulf. Saudi religious ideology was introduced in these institutions. Many senior leaders of the Afghanistan Taliban had attended the Darul Uloom Haqqania seminary in Akora Khattak in Pakistan, and it supported the Taliban. The seminary was run by Sami-ul-Haq of the Jamiat Ulema-e-Islam (JUI), who is often referred to as the "Father of the Taliban". It blended Islamist politics with the teachings of the Deoband movement.

During the power vacuum which was created by the Soviet withdrawal from Afghanistan in 1989, the country was torn apart by warring mujahideen groups. President Mohammad Najibullah warned that "Afghanistan will be turned into a center for terrorism". The Pakistani intelligence initially supported Gulbuddin Hekmatyar's forces, with former Afghan military officers directly under its command. However, he failed when Ahmad Shah Massoud captured Kabul in 1992. Javed Nasir, the new head of ISI, was an open preacher of Islamic values and the most religious leader of the Pakistani intelligence in a generation.

The new Prime Minister, Benazir Bhutto wanted to develop Pakistan's economy through overland trading in Central Asia. Her interior minister Naseerullah Babar was a Pashtun notable who had organised guerrilla training for Afghans in the 1970s. He supported using the Pashtun belt to reach the Central Asian markets. In October 1994, Babar organised a trial convoy of Pakistani exports being delivered to Turkmenistan. As the convoy arrived at the Pakistani border, the Taliban had just begun operating in the area. The ISI grasped the chance to wield power in the region by fostering a previously unknown Kandahari student movement. They continued to support the Taliban, as Pakistani allies, in their push to conquer Afghanistan in the 1990s.

== Emergence in Afghanistan, 1994–1996 ==
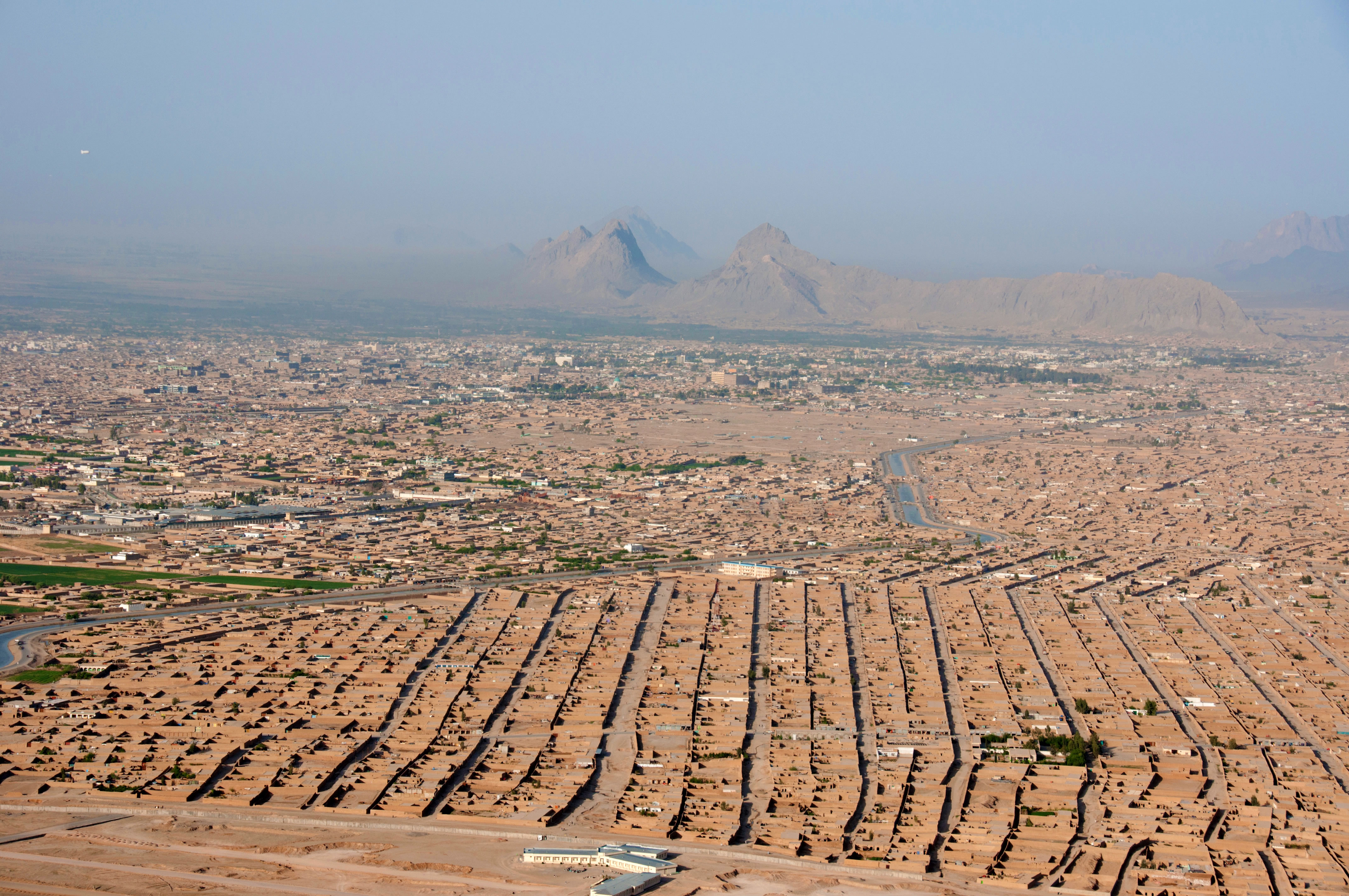
The Taliban emerged in the southern Afghan city of Kandahar around September 1994.

Kandahar had traditionally been the center of Pashtun power and culture, as well as one of the major centres of political power in the country, but by 1994, it had fallen into disarray. Hekmatyar's forces, trucking mafias and local warlords, such as Naqibullah Akhund, dominated the city and freely traveled around it, with hundreds of roadblocks on its main roads and at the same time, widespread acts of violence and sexual crimes were also occurring inside the city. The rise of the Taliban was subsequently portrayed as creating Islamic order against crime and chaos. This connected popular Islamic values with the restoration of the glory of the Durrani Pashtuns. This happened as wealthy Pashtun leaders in Kandahar were looking for a common cause.

=== Military campaign ===
==== Beginnings ====
After the fall of the Najibullah regime, local mullahs who knew each other around Kandahar, including Umar Mujahid, Mohammad Ghous, Hasan Akhund, and Mohammad Rabbani, who knew each other since they had fought together and because all of them were from Uruzgan Province, began to hold discussions about the bad situation which existed in the area. An agenda was agreed to, which included restoring peace, disarming the population, enforcing Sharia law, and advancing Islamist politics in Afghanistan. Since they were mostly students of madrasas, the name Talib was considered appropriate. This also had the advantage of distancing them from the political maneuvering of the mujahideen.

A small Taliban militia first emerged near Kandahar in the spring and summer of 1994, committing vigilante acts against minor warlords, with a fund of US$250,000 being supplied to it by local businessmen. They soon began to receive backing from local Durrani Pashtun leaders. These included Hashmat Ghani Ahmadzai, Hamid Karzai, and the Popalzai. Their backing gave legitimacy to the militia in its early moment. Their aim was to bring back the exiled former King Mohammed Zahir Shah. Mohammed Omar began to meet Pashtun delegations and was made the head of the movement's supreme council.

The Taliban were based in the Helmand, Kandahar, and Uruzgan regions and most of them were ethnically Pashtun from the Durrani tribal confederation. The Taliban were initially treated with an enormous amount of goodwill by Afghans who were weary of the corruption, the brutality, and the incessant fighting among Mujahideen warlords. One story is that the rape and murder of boys and girls who were members of a family which was traveling to Kandahar or a similar outrage by Mujahideen bandits sparked Mohammed Omar (Mullah Omar) and his students to vow to rid Afghanistan of these criminals. Another motivation was that the Pakistan-based truck shipping mafia known as the "Afghanistan Transit Trade" and their allies in the Pakistan government, trained, armed, and financed the Taliban to clear the southern road across Afghanistan to the Central Asian Republics of extortionate bandit gangs.

Around 20,000 Afghan students who decided to join the Taliban came from madrasas which were located in Pakistani refugee camps, and thousands more joined the march on the way. The students were mainly between the ages of 14 and 24, with little education other than Islamic subjects which were taught by "barely literate" teachers who were hired by mullahs or members of Pakistani fundamentalist political parties. They also lacked knowledge of their country's history, including the history of the war against the Soviets. Furthermore, they were ignorant of the tribal and cultural context of their country and community, its traditions and its ethnic groups, having been orphaned and made rootless by the continuous war with little economic prospects, warfare, and puritanical Islam being the only sources of purpose which were available to them. Growing up in Islamic schools or segregated refugee camps or with few female relatives, they had little contact with women when mullahs told them women were a temptation. The Taliban offered the young men a way of life that gave it meaning.

==== Military operations ====
The first major military action which was engaged in by the Taliban occurred in October–November 1994 when they marched from Maiwand in southern Afghanistan to capture Kandahar City and the surrounding provinces, only losing a few dozen men. Either private Pakistani trucking interests or the Pakistani government aided its first military breakthroughs. It captured a weapons dump in mid-October with equipment for tens of thousands of soldiers in 17 tunnels created by Saudi and Pakistani intelligence near the border crossing of Spin Boldak by buying it from an Afghan commander supposedly loyal to Massoud. A Pakistani government convoy was soon aided across checkpoints by the Taliban. By mid-November, the Taliban ruled Kandahar with six Mikoyan-Gurevich MiG-21 fighters and four Mil Mi-17 helicopters captured from the airport.

After Herat fell in September 1995, all of southern Afghanistan was held by the Taliban. In the next three months this hitherto "unknown force" took control of twelve of Afghanistan's 34 provinces, with Mujahideen warlords often surrendering to them without a fight and the "heavily armed population" giving up their weapons. In the spring of 1996, Mullah Omar held a meeting of over a thousand Pashtun leaders for two weeks in Kandahar. It was the largest gathering of religious leaders in modern Afghan history. Pakistani officials also took part. The assembly ratified him as the Amir al-Mu'minin and declared the Islamic Emirate of Afghanistan with a jihad against Massoud. This was the first time since Dost Mohammad Khan for an Afghan leader to be given the title. Omar wore the Cloak of Muhammad, a first for anyone in 60 years. However, no decisions were made on the economic and social future of the country.

The Taliban launched a surprise attack against Jalalabad in August 1996. Osama bin Laden may have supported with up to three million USD to buy off the remaining commanders on the way to Kabul. Other sources of funding may have included Saudi and Gulf individuals, local trucking mafia, heroin traders, and the ISI. Armed with technicals, the Taliban advanced from Surobi District and the plains south of Kabul. On 26 September, Massoud withdrew from the capital to Panjshir Valley and the Taliban entered it the next day. Within a day, every government building and military base had been occupied. Former president Mohammad Najibullah and his brother were killed violently and hanged above a traffic circle. The capture of the capital gave the Taliban a new height of prestige. Weeks after the fall of Kabul, Massoud had founded the Northern Alliance together with defeated northern militias. Hekmatyar, on the other hand, had escaped to Iran, with many of his supporters switching to the Taliban. The country was becoming evermore divided by sectarianism.

=== International response ===
==== Support ====
Pakistan was heavily involved in creating the Taliban in 1994. It saw in the Taliban a way to secure trade routes to Central Asia and establish an Islamic government in Kabul friendly to its interests. The ISI got interested in the early Taliban and Javed Ashraf Qazi met with them, agreeing to provide support. The support subsequently grew from fuel to materiel to cash. Eventually Bhutto described it as carte blanche. By spring 1995, ISI was sending military officers and guerrilla leaders to help Taliban. Inside the country, Shahnawaz Tanai's troops were repairing and operating their tanks and aircraft. The ISI also helped broker a deal whereby Abdul Rashid Dostum's forced helped the Taliban establish an air force. In eastern Afghanistan, local leaders such as Jalaluddin Haqqani swore loyalty to the Taliban. Money and materiel helped create these alliances. Meanwhile, volunteer fighters were arriving from the border madrasas. Umar Mujahid deeply appreciated Pakistani support and even declared, in 1998, that "an attack on Pakistan would be considered as an attack on Afghanistan".

The Saudi intelligence also met with the Taliban, who asked for support to create an Islamic state. Saudi-based charities, such as the International Islamic Relief Organization, gave funding to the Taliban during its rise. The Saudi Committee for the Promotion of Virtue and the Prevention of Vice supported its new Afghan equivalent. Direct subsidies and training made it stronger than other parts of the Taliban government. The Saudis saw this support as a way to buttress their power and form of Islam against Iran.

At the early stage, the then Assistant Secretary of State for South and Central Asian Affairs, Robin Raphel, strongly supported efforts to engage with the Taliban. She also supported a Unocal-led, Taliban-supported pipeline project on trips to Afghanistan and Pakistan in April and August 1996. She was one of the first senior American officials to meet personally with Taliban. Raphel called on the international community to engage the Taliban shortly after its takeover of Kabul. She welcomed their taking of Kabul in September 1996 as a "positive step". Her consistent support for the Taliban from its earliest days earned her the sobriquet "Lady Taliban" in the Indian press.

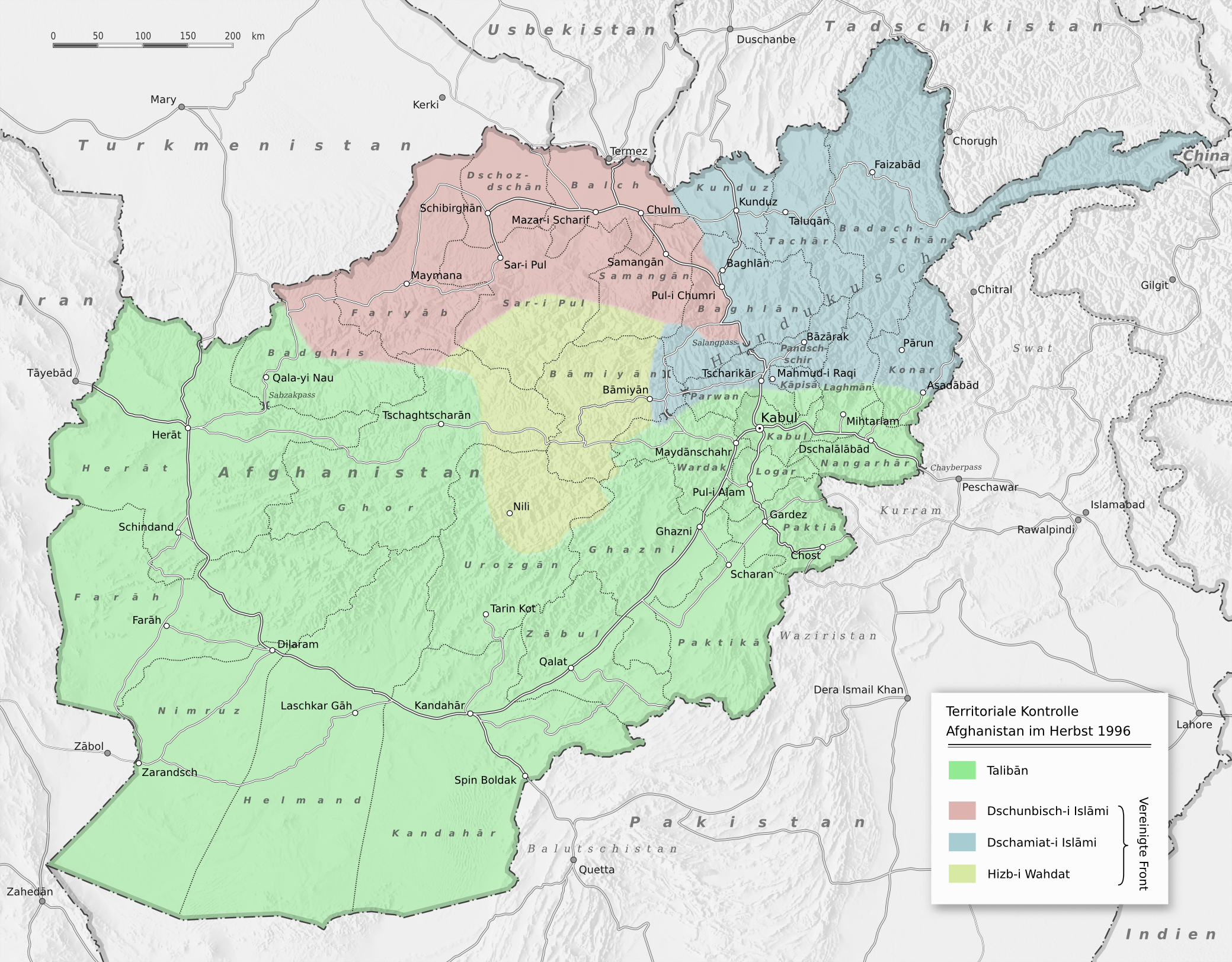
Map showing political control in Afghanistan in late 1996, following the capture of Kabul by the Taliban

The US Ambassador to Pakistan met with the new acting Foreign Minister Mohammad Ghous in Islamabad in November 1996. However, US policy was unclear, with Madeleine Albright denouncing the Taliban at the United Nations, while three weeks later Robin Raphel argued for engaging with the new government at the Security Council. Defenders among the American establishment saw the Taliban as Saudi Arabia-esque conservative Islamists who could act as a counterweight to revolutionary Iran.

Osama bin Laden was moving towards Taliban heartlands in the south during 1996. Pakistani intelligence may have helped form the relationship between the two. The Taliban offered Bin Laden to the Saudis at the time, but they refused the offer. In Kandahar, bin Laden delivered sermons and was praised by Mullah Omar. He also entertained visiting wealthy Gulf Arabs on hunting trips. In return for the Taliban, bin Laden planned to train foreigners who would support the continuing Taliban campaign. Meanwhile, the Taliban assured that Afghanistan would not "be used to launch terrorist attacks".

==== Opposition ====
Iran, Russia and India opposed the Taliban. Iran opposed the anti-Shia force supported by its traditional rival Saudi Arabia. Russia was worried about the effects on the republics of former Soviet Central Asia, especially with regards to the Tajikistani Civil War involving Islamist rebels. India, meanwhile, was mainly opposed to the Pakistani support given to the Taliban. They all gave support to the Taliban's enemies. After the fall of Kabul, Iran, Russia, and the Central Asian republics warned the Taliban not to move north, offering support to its enemies, with the region polarised between support and opposition to the group.

==== Recognition ====
On 26 May 1997, the Pakistani government under Prime Minister Nawaz Sharif formally recognised the Taliban as Afghanistan's legitimate government. Saudi Arabia and the United Arab Emirates followed soon after. The US, meanwhile, refused to give recognition. The Embassy of Afghanistan, Washington, D.C. ended up with two competing claimants for recognition, with the existing ambassador opposing the Taliban, while his deputy swore allegiance to them. After a period of competing missions with neither being given formal recognition, the US finally closed down the embassy and concluded that Afghanistan's government had been suspended.

== Consolidation of power, 1996–2001 ==
In the areas under their rule, the Taliban disarmed the population, imposed Sharia law and brought order, as well as opening the roads to traffic, dropping food prices. The measures were well received by the population. They also closed down schools and banned girls from even studying at home. In Kabul, the Taliban set up a six-man Shura composed of mullahs to rule the city, dominated by out-of-town Durrani Pashtuns and led by Mohammad Rabbani, as well as including Mohammad Ghous as the Foreign Minister and Amir Khan Muttaqi as the Information Minister. The leadership had never lived in a large city, many having never visited Kabul before. The city was soon essentially under occupation. In the north, the civil war with the Northern Alliance continued.

=== Religious regulations ===
Radio Kabul was renamed Voice of the Sharia and used to announce new religious rules. Under the Taliban regime, Sharia law was interpreted to ban a wide variety of activities hitherto lawful in Afghanistan: employment, education and sports for women, movies, television, videos, music, dancing, hanging pictures in homes, clapping during sports events, kite flying, and beard trimming. One Taliban list of prohibitions included:

pork, pig, pig oil, anything made from human hair, satellite dishes, cinematography, and equipment that produces the joy of music, pool tables, chess, masks, alcohol, tapes, computers, VCRs, television, anything that propagates sex and is full of music, wine, lobster, nail polish, firecrackers, statues, sewing catalogs, pictures, Christmas cards.

Men were required to have a beard extending farther than a fist clamped at the base of the chin. On the other hand, they had to wear their head hair short. Men were also required to wear a head covering. Possession was forbidden of depictions of living things, whether drawings, paintings or photographs, stuffed animals, and dolls. Movie theaters were closed and music was banned. Hundreds of cultural artifacts that were deemed polytheistic were also destroyed including a major museum and countless private art collections. A sample Taliban edict issued after their capture of Kabul is one decreed in December 1996 by the Taliban's religious police banning a variety of things and activities: music, shaving of beards, keeping of pigeons, flying kites, displaying of pictures or portraits, western hairstyles, music and dancing at weddings, gambling, "sorcery", and not praying at prayer times. In February 2001, Taliban used sledgehammers to destroy representational works of art at the National Museum of Afghanistan.

Local festivities were not exempt from prohibitions. The Taliban banned the traditional Afghan New Year's celebrations and "for a time they also banned [Ashura] the Shia Islamic month of mourning and even restricted any show of festivity at Eid." The Afghan people were not allowed to have any cultural celebrations if women were present. If there were only men at the celebration it would be allowed, so long as it ended by 7:00 p.m, a set time. Many Taliban officials were slightly opposed to the idea of no entertainment, but even they wanted it to follow many of the religious restrictions. These rules were issued by the Ministry for the Promotion of Virtue and Suppression of Vice (PVSV) and enforced by its "religious police," a concept thought to be borrowed from the Saudis. In newly conquered towns hundreds of religious police beat offenders (typically men without beards and women who were not wearing their burqas properly) with long sticks.

Theft was punished by the amputation of a hand, rape and murder by public execution. Married adulterers were stoned to death. In Kabul, punishments were carried out in front of crowds in Ghazi Stadium, the city's former soccer stadium.

==== Treatment of women ====
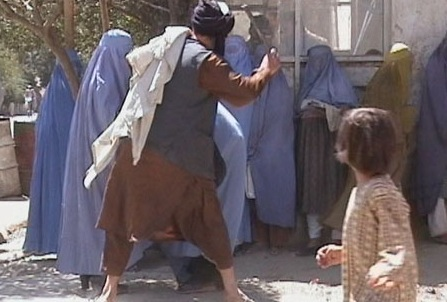
A member of the Taliban's religious police beating a woman in Kabul on 26 August 2001. The footage was filmed by RAWA.

Women in particular were targets of the Taliban's restrictions. They were prohibited from working; from wearing clothing regarded as "stimulating and attractive," including the "Iranian chador," (viewed as insufficiently complete in its covering); from taking a taxi without a "close male relative" (mahram); washing clothes in streams; or having their measurements taken by tailors.

Employment of women was restricted to the medical sector because male medical personnel were not allowed to examine women. One result of the Taliban's ban on employment of women was the closing down of many primary schools, in places such as Kabul, not only for girls but for boys too, because almost all the teachers there were women.

Women were made to wear the burqa, a traditional Pashtun dress covering the entire body, with a small screen covering the face through which the wearer could see. Taliban restrictions became more severe after they took control of the capital. In February 1998, religious police forced all women off the streets of Kabul and issued new regulations ordering "householders to blacken their windows, so women would not be visible from the outside." Home schools for girls, which had been allowed to continue, were forbidden. In June 1998, the Taliban stopped all women from attending general hospitals, leaving the use of one all-women hospital in Kabul. There were many reports of Muslim women being beaten by the Taliban for violating the Taliban interpretation of the Sharia.

=== The continuing war ===
While the south of Afghanistan contained most of the population, the north contained 60 percent of the country's agricultural resources and 80 percent of its industrial, mineral and gas resources, with the Taliban viewing its capture as a high priority. The Taliban quickly moved into northern provinces, with Abdul Rashid Dostum fleeing to Uzbekistan. In the Battles of Mazar-i-Sharif, 2,500 Taliban troops took over the city in 1997, imposing oppressive rule on the historically diverse and tolerant city. On 28 May, a street altercation escalated into street battles in which 600 Taliban were massacred and 1000 captured, including ten top leaders. Abdul Malik Pahlawan's forces retook the provinces of Takhar, Faryab, Jowzjan, and Sar-e Pol. Thousands of captured Taliban and hundreds of Pakistanis were massacred.

In the south, Masoud saw his opportunity to counter-attack, territory around Kabul and killing hundreds of Taliban. The Hazaras also took advantage of the moment, ending the nine-month siege of Hazarajat. The Taliban was experiencing the worst defeat in its history, with over 3,000 casualties and 3,600 troops captured in ten weeks, while over 250 Pakistanis were killed and 550 captured. Mullah Omar called for fresh arrivals from the Pakistani madrasas, with 5,000 answering the call. Help was also sought from Ghilji tribesmen. The northern fighting also had the effect of forcing the sides of the Tajikistani Civil War to negotiate a peace out of fear of the Taliban. This allowed Masoud to receive Iranian and Russian support more effectively, with the Northern Alliance declaring Mazar their capital on 13 June 1997.

==== Ethnic massacres and persecution ====
The fighting had caused the ethnic divisions of Afghanistan to worsen. Uzbeks and Hazaras had massacred captured Taliban fighters. The mass graves where Taliban prisoners had been massacred near Sheberghan were later revealed to have contained over 2000 bodies, with the UN finding that they had been tortured and starved. The prisoners had been thrown into wells with 10 to 15 metres of water, followed by shots and handgrenades before the wells were bulldozed shut. They had also been suffocated in containers. The Taliban had in turn massacred Hazara villagers and pushed out Tajiki farmers. The Taliban were also forcing out humanitarian aid agencies such as the United Nations High Commissioner for Refugees and Save the Children.

The worst attack on civilians came in summer of 1998 when the Taliban swept north from Herat to the predominantly Hazara and Uzbek city of Mazar-i-Sharif, the largest city in the north. Entering at 10 am on 8 August 1998, for the next two days the Taliban drove their pickup trucks "up and down the narrow streets of Mazar-i-Sharif shooting to the left and right and killing everything that moved – shop owners, cart pullers, women and children shoppers and even goats and donkeys." More than 8000 noncombatants were reported killed in Mazar-i-Sharif and later in Bamyan. Contrary to the injunctions of Islam, which demands immediate burial, the Taliban forbade anyone to bury the corpses for the first six days while they rotted in the summer heat and were eaten by dogs. In addition to this indiscriminate slaughter, the Taliban sought out and massacred members of the Hazara, a mostly Shia ethnic group, while in control of Mazar-i-Sharif.

While the slaughter can be attributed to several factors – ethnic difference, suspicion of Shia Hazara loyalty to their co-religionists in Iran, fury at the loss of life suffered in an earlier unsuccessful Taliban takeover of Mazar – the takfir (accusation of apostasy) by the Sunni Taliban of the Shia Hazaras may have been the principal motivation, as apostasy in Islam is punishable by death. The Hazara also were more equal towards women, with their Hezbe Wahdat having women in its leadership council and with some fighting alongside the men, even killing Taliban. It was expressed by Mullah Niazi, the commander of the attack and governor of Mazar after the attack, in his declaration from Mazar's central mosque:

Last year you rebelled against us and killed us. From all your homes you shot at us. Now we are here to deal with you. The Hazaras are not Muslims and now we have to kill Hazaras. You either accept to be Muslims or leave Afghanistan. Wherever you go we will catch you. If you go up we will pull you down by your feet; if you hide below, we will pull you up by your hair.

Hazara also suffered a siege by the Taliban of their Hazarajat homeland in central Afghanistan and the refusal by the Taliban to allow the UN to supply food to Hazara in the provinces of Bamiyan, Ghor, Wardak and Ghazni. A month after the Mazar slaughter, Taliban broke through Hazar lines and took over Hazarajat. The number of civilians killed was not as great as in Mazar, but occurred nevertheless.

==== Buddhas of Bamiyan ====
In March 2001, the Taliban ordered the demolition of two statues of Buddhas carved into cliffsides at Bamiyan, one 38 metres (125 ft) tall and carved in 507 CE, the other 53 metres (174 ft) tall and carved in 554 CE. The act was condemned by UNESCO and many countries around the world.

The intentions of the destruction remain unclear. Mullah Omar initially supported the preservation of Afghanistan's heritage, and Japan linked financial aid to the preservation of the statues. However, after a few years, a decree was issued claiming all representations of humans and idols, including those in museums, must be destroyed in accordance with Islamic law which prohibits any form of idol worship.

The government of Pakistan (itself host to one of the richest and most ancient collections of Buddhist art) implored the Taliban to spare the statues. Saudi Arabia and the United Arab Emirates later denounced the act as savage.

Sayed Rahmatullah Hashemi, a senior representative of the Taliban designated as the roving Ambassador, visited the US in March, 2001. He portrayed the Taliban's action not as an act of irrationality, but as an act of rage over UNESCO and some western governments denying the Taliban use of the funds meant for the repairs of the war-damaged statues of the Buddha. He contended that the Taliban intended to use the money for drought relief. However, the Taliban spent much money and effort on destroying the statues, resources which they could have instead used for drought relief.

=== International relations ===
In 1998, the Taliban also forced foreign aid agencies to shut down. Saudi Arabia still supported them by providing pick up trucks and money, while Pakistan supported logistics and sent officers to help attacks. Iran, Russia, and Uzbekistan all supported the Northern Alliance. The support from the former two included vehicles and helicopters. During the 1998 massacres in Mazar, the Taliban killed 11 Iranian diplomats, intelligence officers, and a journalist under direct orders from Mullah Omar. Iran threatened with war, sending 70,000 Islamic Revolutionary Guard Corps troops to the border. Later, 200,000 regular soldiers were sent to the border, while the Taliban mobilised 5,000 fighters in response. However, tensions calmed after Afghanistan promised to release all Iranian truck drivers and return the bodies of the diplomats. After the 1998 United States embassy bombings, the US struck Bin Laden's training camps in northeastern Afghanistan with cruise missiles, killing over 20 people. UN offices around the country were attacked by mobs in response, and an Italian UN military officer was killed while a French diplomat was wounded, with the organisation leaving Kabul.

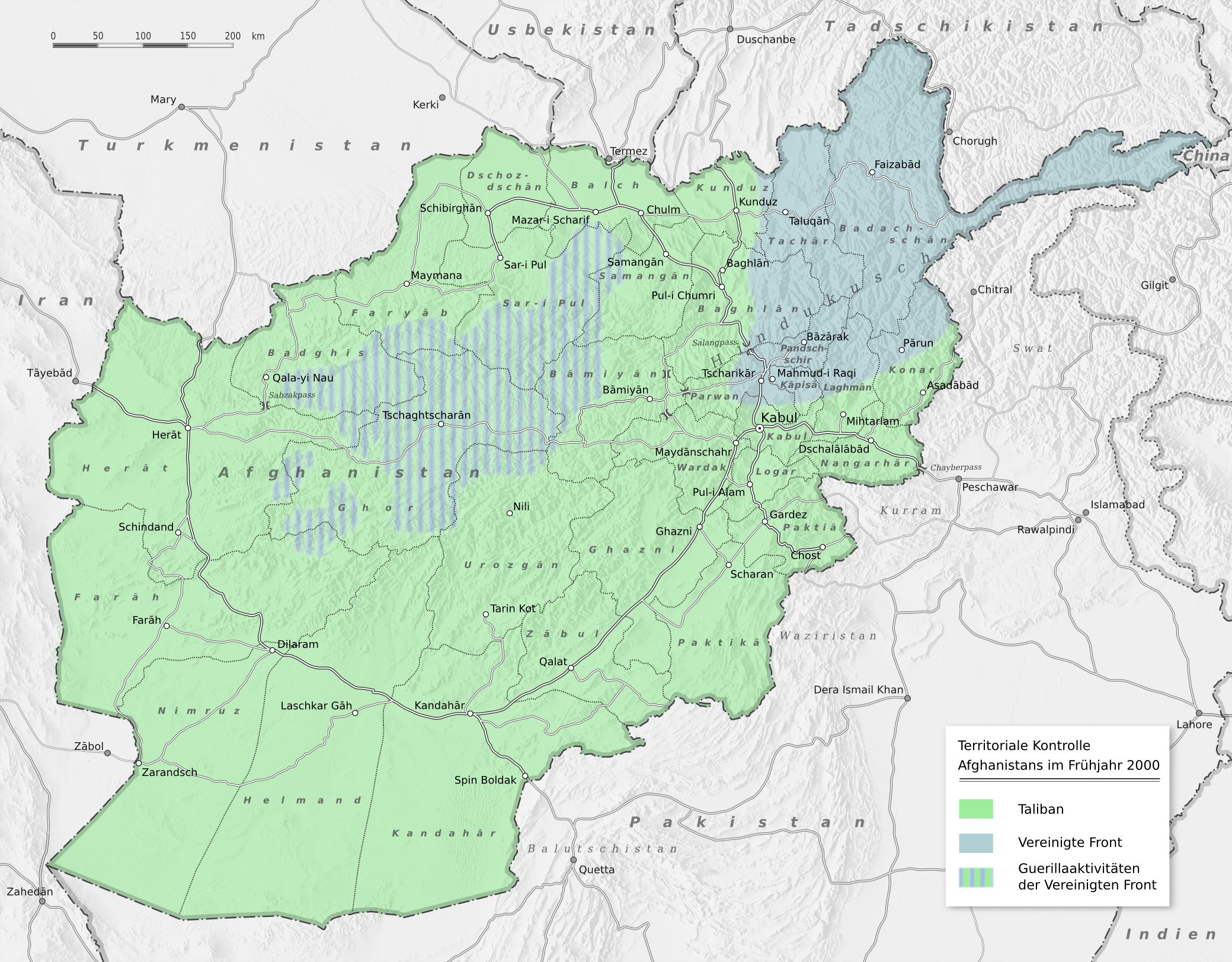
The Islamic Emirate of Afghanistan and the Northern Alliance in early 2000, when the Taliban was at the height of its power

International pressure increased as Kazakhstan, Kyrgyzstan, Uzbekistan, Tajikistan, and Russia met in Tashkent on 25 August 1998 to make shared plans to stop the Taliban from advancing further. The wider international community continued to decry the Taliban's gender policies and refusal to honour diplomatic norms. After Saudi Arabia withdrew its representatives from Kabul and cut funding, Pakistan remained the only ally. The country's support was increased after the 1999 Pakistani coup d'état. The United Nations Security Council passed a resolution on 8 December 1998 threatening with sanctions if the Taliban did not change its behaviour, including in harbouring terrorists. On 15 October 1999, the bank accounts of the Taliban were frozen and international flights in and out of the country banned by the Security Council. On 6 February 2000, an Ariana Afghan Airlines flight was hijacked and flown to London by passengers asking for asylum. After the drought of 2000, the Taliban only received 8 million out of 67 million US dollars requested for aid from international donors. An embassy by the unrecognised breakaway state of Chechen Republic of Ichkeria was opened in 2000, further angering Russia.

== US invasion and insurgency, 2001–2021 ==
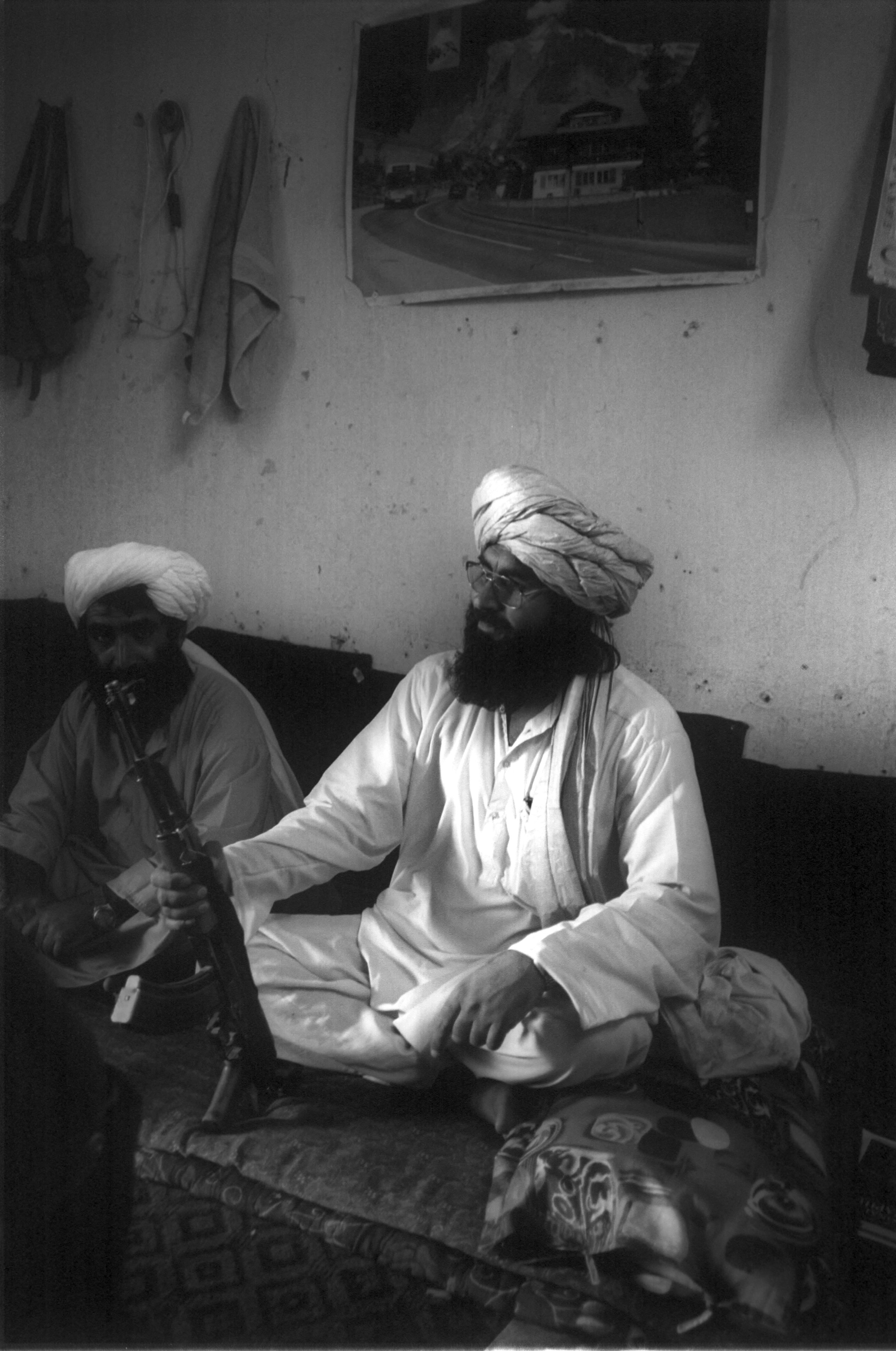
Taliban border guard in 2001

Following the United States invasion of Afghanistan in 2001, the Taliban was quickly defeated in a campaign of American air power and special forces supporting anti-Taliban forces, being completely routed by November. An estimated 8,000 to 12,000 Taliban were killed, making up to 20 percent of total manpower. The Islamic Emirate of Afghanistan ceased to exist and Mullah Omar escaped to Pakistan.

The reasons for the remobilisation of the Taliban were related to the desire to push out foreign occupiers from the country, as well as the unjust treatment of former Taliban at the hands of the new government. Some non-Taliban began supporting them after bad experiences with the new government and the US forces. However, the early support was limited, with attempts at infiltration often unsuccessful at this stage.

=== Early attempts at re-organising ===
Only in mid-2002 exiled Taliban leaders in Pakistan began reconnecting with each other. Until 2003, even the Pakistani government began rejecting the defeated Taliban. Funding and supplies were also low, with the first donations coming in 2002 and early 2003 from some supportive Afghan businessmen and a few Arab donors. The tribal elders were also not in support of a new war. This led to some Taliban leaders considering joining the political process, with meetings on the issue until 2004, though these did not result in a decision to do so.

From 2002, Taliban groups inside Afghanistan began operating without the leadership in Pakistan. These groups were usually organised in mahazes ('fronts'), with between tens and a few hundred members each. In Pakistan, leaders tried to organise their old contacts. At first, the response was muted with few remaining in the ranks, mainly active in organisational activities. Assassinations and night letters against government collaborators were starting by 2003, however. Local groups started coalescing together under senior leaders, with such active leaders in Kandahar, Helmand, and Ghazni.

In the east, Taliban activity began again through local commanders, groups of foreign al-Qaeda jihadists, as well as pro-Taliban networks in the Federally Administered Tribal Areas and North-West Frontier Province of Pakistan. Nangarhar Province emerged as the first Taliban centre in the region, with three autonomous groups being formed during 2002–2003. However, logistical problems kept activities limited in eastern Afghanistan. Most attacks were raids across the border from Pakistan. However, in 2004 another centre of activity came into existence in Nuristan Province and Kunar Province, with a guerrilla campaign in the mountains.

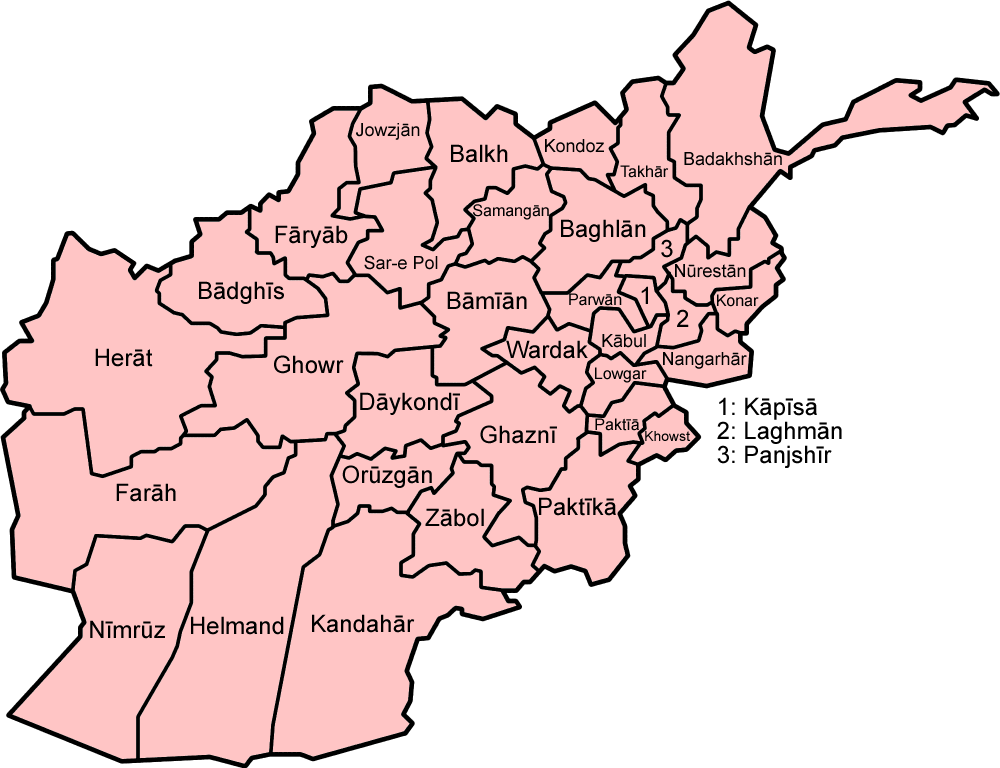
Provinces of Afghanistan

In Kabul, operations were fragmented, with few large fronts. In northeastern Maidan Wardak Province, local commanders had organised fronts by 2005. A similar situation was happening in the nearby Logar Province. The largest front in the northeast was established in the Baghlan Province.

=== Emergence of organised resistance ===
The first attempt at a larger organisation of Taliban groups after the invasion occurred in April 2002 in the country's south. A shura was established by former mid-level Taliban officials in Gardi Jangal in a refugee camp near the Helman border. It operated in the core southern provinces of Kandahar, Helmand, Zabul, and Uruzgan, with a commanding representative in each one. Its fighters were claimed to be Taliban forces who never demobilised, and used weapons and ammunition left by the Emirate inside Afghanistan. It was composed of 23 groups of about 50 individuals each, for a total of around 1,100–1,200. However, it never established a shadow government, without any governance structures beyond the shura, representatives, and commanders. The commanders were self-sufficient, reducing fighting capability. It shut down in 2003.

In the North Waziristan District of Pakistan, Jalaluddin Haqqani had started organising after exiling there in 2001. In early 2002 their manpower was estimated at 1,400. Haqqani network forces appeared in Paktia Province and Khost Province in the second half of 2002 with limited activity. Former members began to return in North and South Waziristan, as well as Hangu District, with al-Qaeda and local tribesmen also joining. Foreign fighters played a large role, with much support coming from northwest Pakistan. After military capacity was proven, Pakistani authorities also began to support to a significant extent. After support from the authorities to start a jihad in southeastern Afghanistan, the Miramshah shura was established on 14 February 2003, with senior Pakistani officials attending. In 2003, the shura appointed representatives in 46 districts and four provinces.

The top leaders of the Taliban took longer to re-organise, with an easying of movement, increased funding, and the pressure to take advantage of new resistance movements causing the Quetta Shura to become established on 14 March 2003, including by Abdul Ghani Baradar, Dadullah, Akhtar Mansur, and Gul Agha Ishakzai. The goal was reportedly not originally to overthrow the new government, but to gain an accommodation with it. Mullah Omar was not a part, but later endorsed the Shura. It made the southern insurgency more organised, with provincial and district governors in all its areas. In 2003 this included Kandahar and Helmand, and by 2004 Zabul, Uruzgan, Ghazni, Paktia, and Paktika. Support from Pakistan was modest in 2003–2004, with total external funding at US$20 million at the time. In 2005, however, Pakistan informed it of full support. The Haqqanis also joined the Shura. From 2005, the Shura began organising new structures for policymaking, such as a Health Commission and a Finance Commission. A Shura was also established for appointments of governors and commanders.

=== Beginning of insurgency operations ===
In May and June 2003, high Taliban officials proclaimed the Taliban regrouped and ready for guerrilla war to expel US forces from Afghanistan. Omar assigned five operational zones to Taliban commanders such as Dadullah. Dadullah took charge in Zabul province. From the second half of 2003 and through 2004 operations started intensifying, with night letters followed by kidnappings and assassinations of government officials and collaborating village elders by 2005, with the former leaving villages in fear. Government schools and clinics were also burned down. Propaganda was also a part of the effort, with mosques used for disseminating messages, as well as tarana ballads.

While the early insurgent groups had been small and tied to local commanders, the Quetta Shura systematised them with a mandatory fixed strength of 25 for each group (called a sar group), though this might be lower in practice. These might be joined into a front around a popular commander. Above group commanders were district governors, and above them provincial governors. The units were usually ethnically homogenous. Groups could also specialise from tax collection to intelligence and special operations, among other specialties. Formations of 300–350 fighters were deployed for operations. Dadullah was the most powerful commander, with around 2000 fighters, and eventually gaining command of all operations in the south.

In late 2004, the then hidden Taliban leader Umar Mujahid announced an insurgency against "America and its puppets" (i.e. transitional Afghan government forces) to "regain the sovereignty of our country". The 2004 Afghan presidential election was a major target, though only 20 districts and 200 villages elsewhere were claimed to have been successfully prevented from voting. Pakistan reportedly limited movement due to U.S. pressure, though Saudi Arabia may have aided in turn.

=== Intensifying combat ===
The year 2005 is commonly seen as a turning point for the Taliban insurgency. This is when the Taliban began expanding beyond their old circles from the days of the Emirate. The 2005 Afghan parliamentary election was more successfully disrupted, with 30–40 districts claimed to have been prevented from voting. The ISI reportedly paid US$30 million for this effort. Nevertheless, violence remained mild. The Taliban launched a re-escalation of the insurgency campaign in 2006. That year, a coordinated campaign against state education began, with a 65 percent increase in attacks.

== Return to power, 2021–present ==
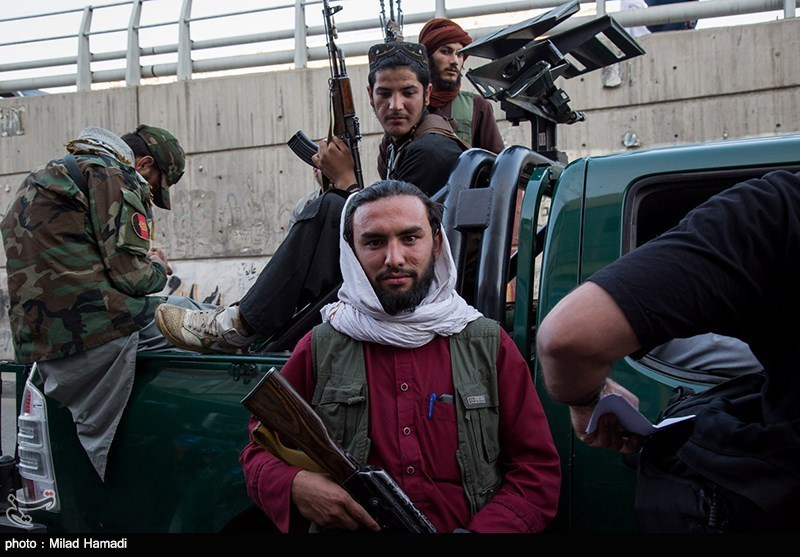
Taliban militants in Kabul in September 2021

On 29 February 2020, the United States and the Taliban signed a peace agreement in Doha, Qatar, officially titled the Agreement for Bringing Peace to Afghanistan. The provisions of the deal included the withdrawal of all American and NATO troops from Afghanistan, a Taliban pledge to prevent al-Qaeda from operating in areas which were under Taliban control, and talks between the Taliban and the Afghan government. The deal was supported by China, Russia and Pakistan, although it did not involve the government of Afghanistan. In September 2020, over 5,000 Taliban prisoners, including 400 of whom were accused and convicted of major crimes such as murder, were released by the Afghan government as part of the Doha Agreement between the United States and the Taliban. According to Afghanistan's National Security Council, many of the released prisoners who were "experts" returned to the battlefield and strengthened the Taliban's hand.

In early 2021, both the Pentagon and the Afghan government believed that continuous US military support would need to be provided to Kabul. However, President Biden continued to follow President Trump's persistent policy to move the US away from an endless foreign war, despite the fact that the Afghan government continued to rely on the US's manpower and military support. The Biden administration announced in April 2021 that it would continue the withdrawal beyond the initial deadline, with an expected completion date by 11 September 2021. On 8 July, Biden shifted the U.S. withdrawal deadline to 31 August. The Taliban and allied militant groups began a widespread offensive on 1 May 2021, simultaneous with the withdrawal of most U.S. troops from Afghanistan. Following its rapid defeat across the country, the Afghan National Army was left in chaos, and only two units remained operational by mid-August: The 201st Corps and 111th Division, both based in Kabul. The capital city itself was left encircled after Taliban forces had captured Mihtarlam, Sharana, Gardez, Asadabad, and other cities as well as districts in the east. Kabul, the capital, fell to Taliban forces on 15 August 2021. The capture took place hours after President Ashraf Ghani fled from the country.

=== Islamic Emirate of Afghanistan (2021–present) ===
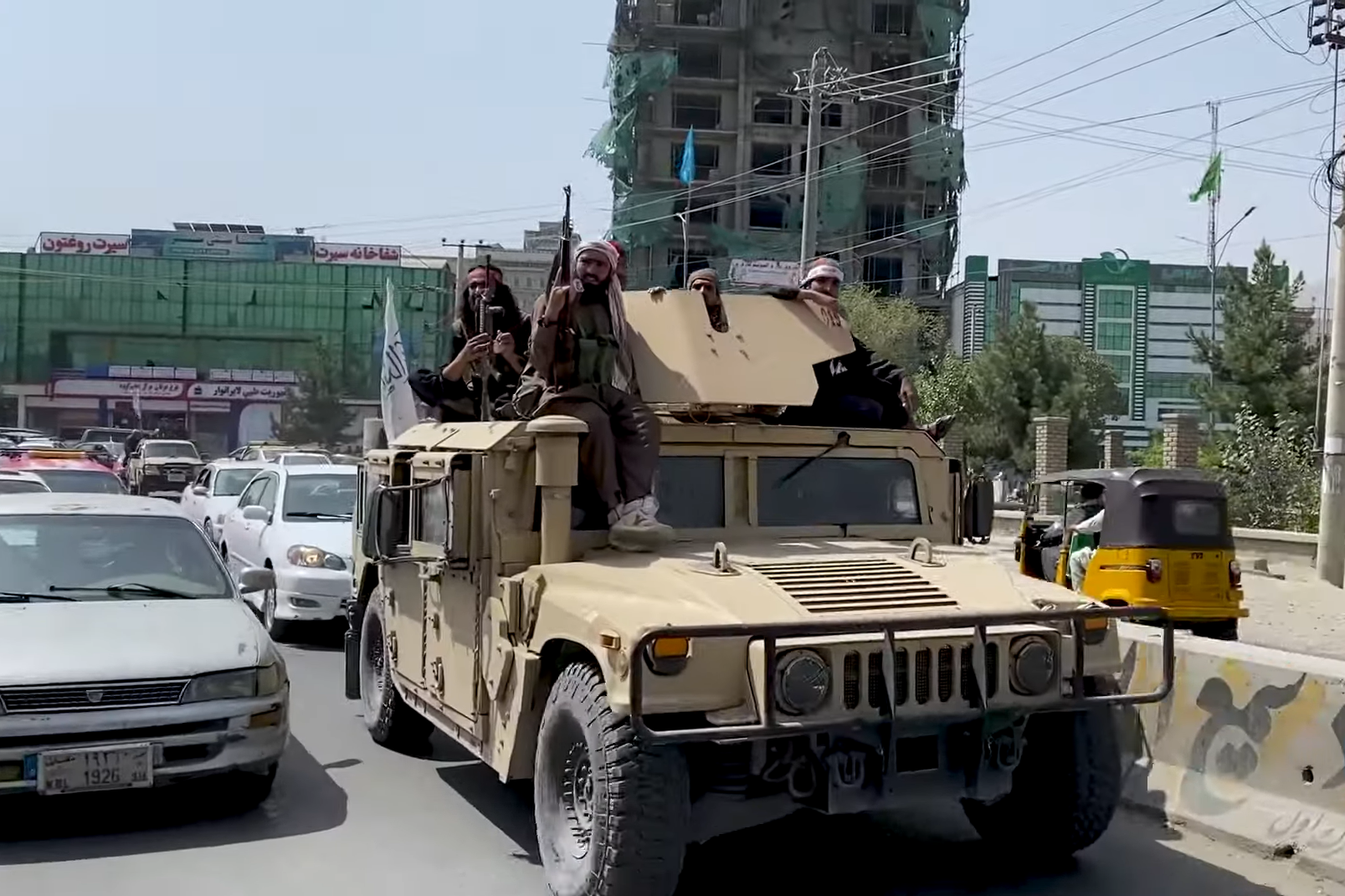
Taliban Humvee in Kabul, August 2021

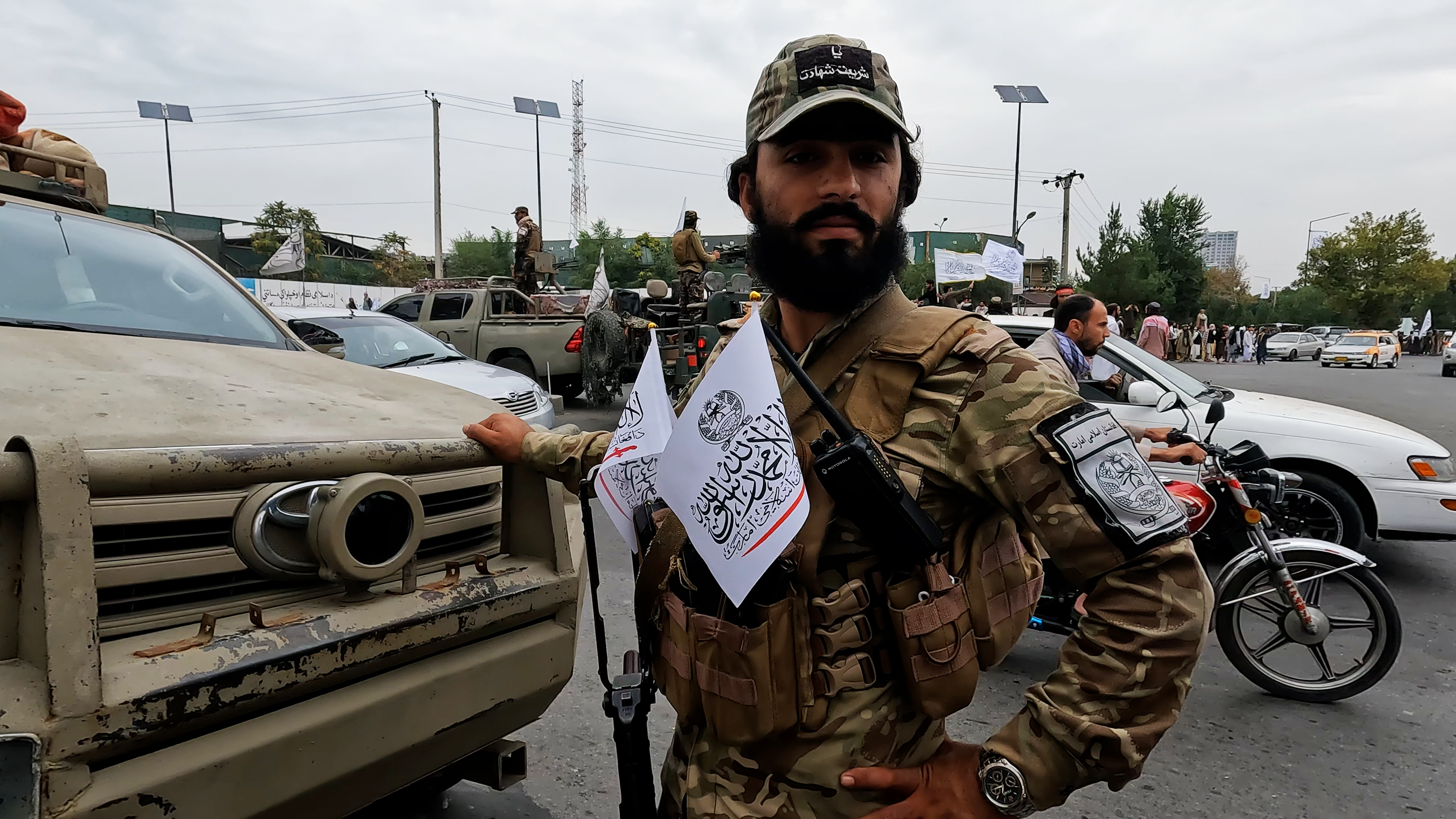
A Taliban member with chest flags in Kabul, August 2022

The Taliban seized power from a government supported by some of the world's most advanced militaries. As an ideological insurgent movement seeking to establish an Islamic state, its victory has been compared by commentators to the Chinese Communist Revolution of 1949 and the Iranian Revolution of 1979, both of which reshaped their societies. However, in interviews conducted in 2021–2022, senior Taliban leaders emphasized the relative moderation of their revolution and expressed a desire for constructive relations with the United States, according to journalist Jon Lee Anderson.

Anderson notes that the Taliban's earlier campaign against images and iconography has largely been abandoned, a change he suggests may be linked to the ubiquity of smartphones and social media. Local political figure Sayed Hamid Gailani argued that the Taliban have not carried out widespread killings since returning to power. Women continue to appear in public, and Taliban spokesperson Zabihullah Mujahid stated that some women remain employed in government ministries. He also claimed that girls would be permitted to attend secondary school once the government had access to frozen bank funds, which he said would allow the creation of separate facilities and transportation.

The Ministry of Women's Affairs was closed, and its building repurposed to house the Ministry for the Propagation of Virtue and the Prevention of Vice. According to Jon Lee Anderson, some women who remained formally employed by the government were required to sign in at their offices but then return home, a practice intended to create the appearance of gender equity. Anderson also reported that the appointment of ethnic minorities to government positions was described by a Taliban adviser as tokenistic. In response to international criticism over the lack of diversity in government appointments, the Taliban named an ethnic Hazara as deputy health minister and an ethnic Tajik as deputy trade minister.

Reports have circulated of Hazara farmers being displaced by ethnic Pashtuns, of raids on activists' homes, and of extrajudicial executions of former government soldiers and intelligence agents. A report released by Human Rights Watch in November 2021 stated that the Taliban killed or forcibly disappeared more than 100 former members of the Afghan security forces in the three months following their takeover, in the provinces of Ghazni, Helmand, Kandahar, and Kunduz. The report indicated that Taliban forces identified targets for arrest and execution through intelligence operations and access to employment records left behind. It also documented cases in which former security personnel were killed within days of registering with the Taliban to obtain letters guaranteeing their safety.

When asked about the violence against Hazara Shia communities, the Taliban's former nominee for ambassador to the United Nations, spokesman Suhail Shaheen, told Jon Lee Anderson that the Hazara Shia were regarded as fellow Muslims and part of Afghan society: "We believe we are one, like flowers in a garden."

Explanations for the relative moderation of the new Taliban government include its unexpected rapid takeover of the country, which left internal factions with unresolved issues, and the severe economic constraints created by frozen Afghan government funds abroad. Approximately US$7 billion in Afghan assets held in American banks were blocked, and about 80 percent of the former government's budget—previously funded by the United States, its partners, and international lenders—was cut off, contributing to a major economic crisis. According to the United Nations World Food Program country director Mary Ellen McGroarty, 22.8 million Afghans were already severely food insecure by late 2021, with seven million on the brink of famine. The international community has expressed a reluctance to recognize the Taliban regime, urging it to form an inclusive government, safeguard the rights of women and minorities, and prevent Afghanistan from serving as a base for global terrorist operations. In discussions with Jon Lee Anderson, senior Taliban leaders suggested that their strict application of sharia law during the 1990s was a response to the disorder left by the Soviet occupation, but asserted that mercy and compassion were now guiding principles. Former officials from the Ministry of Women's Affairs disputed these claims, with one telling Anderson that the Taliban's conciliatory statements were aimed at securing international financing, and predicted that women would eventually be forced to wear the burqa again.

In late 2021, journalists from The New York Times embedded with a six-man Taliban unit assigned to protect the Shi'ite Sakhi Shrine in Kabul from attacks by the Islamic State, highlighted that the men appeared to take their task seriously. The unit's commander stated that their goal was to provide security for all Afghans, regardless of ethnic background. Although Taliban officials claimed that the Islamic State had been defeated, the group carried out suicide bombings in October 2021 at Shia mosques in Kunduz and Kandahar, killing more than 115 people. As of late 2021, Kabul continued to experience frequent small-scale attacks, including "sticky bomb" explosions occurring every few days, according to Jon Lee Anderson.

After Taliban retook power in 2021, border clashes erupted between the Taliban with its neighbors includes Iran and Pakistan, leading to casualties on both sides.

In the early months of Taliban rule, international journalists have had some access to Afghanistan. In February 2022, several foreign journalists, including Andrew North, were detained. The Committee to Protect Journalists described the incident as indicative of a broader decline in press freedom and increasing attacks on journalists under Taliban rule. The journalists were released after several days. Watchdog organizations have since documented additional arrests of local journalists and restrictions on access for international reporters.

The country's small community of Sikhs—who form Afghanistan's second largest religious minority—as well as Hindus, were reported to have been prevented from publicly celebrating their holidays in 2023 by the Taliban government. The Taliban issued a later statement praising these communities and assured them that their private land and property would be secured. In April 2024, the former sole Sikh member of parliament, Narendra Singh Khalsa, returned to Afghanistan for the first time since the collapse of the Republic.

== Bibliography ==
- Wasim, Muhammad Khalid (19 October 2025). "Attacks on Afghanistan on Pakistan". Daily Jang (in Urdu).
- Macias, Amanda (13 April 2021). "Biden plans to withdraw U.S. forces from Afghanistan by Sept. 11, missing May deadline, reports say". MSNBC. Archived from the original on 13 April 2021.
- Miller, Zeke; Madhani, Aamer (8 July 2021). "Biden says US war in Afghanistan will end August 31". AP News. Archived from the original on 8 July 2021.
- Qazi, Shereena (29 February 2020). "Afghanistan's Taliban, US sign agreement aimed at ending war". Al-Jazeera.
- "US and Taliban sign deal to end 18-year Afghan war". BBC News. 29 February 2020.
- Basu, Nayanima (12 September 2020). "India asserts Afghanistan's 'national sovereignty' as peace talks with Taliban start in Qatar". ThePrint.
- Mashal, Mujib; Faizi, Fatima (3 September 2020). "Afghanistan to Release Last Taliban Prisoners, Removing Final Hurdle to Talks". The New York Times. Archived from the original on 8 August 2021.
- George, Susannah (8 August 2021). "'This is a big problem': The Taliban are storming prisons holding thousands of militants". The Independent. Archived from the original on 9 August 2021.
- Sanger, David E.; Cooper, Helene (14 August 2021). "Taliban Sweep in Afghanistan Follows Years of U.S. Miscalculations". The New York Times. ISSN 0362-4331. Archived from the original on 15 August 2021.
- Barfield, Thomas (2012). Afghanistan: A Cultural and Political History. Princeton University Press. p. 327. ISBN 978-0-691-15441-1.
- Gall, Carlotta (13 November 2004). "Asia: Afghanistan: Taliban Leader Vows Return". The New York Times.
- "US Country Report on Human Rights Practices – Afghanistan 2001". United States Department of State. 4 March 2002.
- "Afghanistan: The Massacre in Mazar-I Sharif". Human Rights Watch. 1 November 1998.
- "Pakistan and Japan plead for Afghan statues". CNN. 9 March 2001.
- Hashimi, Syed Rahmatullah (10 March 2001). "Lecture: Taliban in Afghanistan". robert-fisk.com. Archived from the original on 25 October 2008.
- Tohid, Owias & Baldauf, Scott (8 May 2003). "Taliban appears to be regrouped and well-funded". Christian Science Monitor.
- Tohid, Owias (27 June 2003). "Taliban regroups – on the road". Christian Science Monitor.
- Wright, Lawrence (2006). The Looming Tower: Al-Qaeda and the Road to 9/11. New York: Knopf. ISBN 1-4000-3084-6.
- Waldman, Amy (22 November 2001). "No TV, no Chess, No Kites: Taliban's Code, from A to Z". New York Times.
- Sanchez, Raf (7 November 2014). "FBI searches home of former envoy labelled 'Lady Taliban'". Telegraph.
- Swami, Praveen (18 January 2012). "Lead West's romancing of the Taliban". The Hindu.
- Coll, Steve (2004). Ghost Wars: The Secret History of the CIA, Afghanistan, and Bin Laden, from the Soviet invasion to September 10, 2001. Penguin Books. pp. 334–335. ISBN 1594200076.
- Dorronsoro, Gilles (June 2001). "The World Isolates the Taliban". Global Policy Forum.
- Porter, Tom (21 November 2014). "FBI Investigates US Diplomat Dubbed 'Lady Taliban' over Secrets Leak". International Business Times.
- Pape, Robert A.; Feldman, James K. (2010). Cutting the Fuse: The Explosion of Global Suicide Terrorism and How to Stop It. University of Chicago Press. ISBN 978-0-226-64564-3.
- Harf, James E.; Lombardi, Mark Owen (2005). The Unfolding Legacy of 9/11. University Press of America. ISBN 978-0-7618-3009-2.
- Hinnells, John; King, Richard (2007). Religion and Violence in South Asia: Theory and Practice. Routledge. ISBN 978-1-134-19219-9.
- Boase, Roger (2016). Islam and Global Dialogue: Religious Pluralism and the Pursuit of Peace. Routledge. ISBN 978-1-317-11262-4.
- Gardner, Hall (2007). American Global Strategy and the 'War on Terrorism'. Ashgate. ISBN 978-1-4094-9589-5.
- Shaffer, Brenda (2006). The Limits of Culture: Islam and Foreign Policy. MIT Press. ISBN 978-0-262-19529-4.
- Forsythe, David P (2009). Encyclopedia of Human Rights. Vol. 1: Afghanistan-Democracy and the Right to Participate. Oxford University Press. ISBN 978-0-19-533402-9.
- Peimani, Hooman (2003). Falling Terrorism and Rising Conflicts: The Afghan "Contribution" to Polarization and Confrontation in West and South Asia. Greenwood Publishing Group. ISBN 978-0-275-97857-0.
- Jones, Owen Bennett (2003). Pakistan: Eye of the Storm. Yale University Press. ISBN 978-0-300-10147-8.
- Dalrymple, William (28 March 2005). "Inside Islam's "terror schools"". New Statesman.
- Rashid, Haroon (2 October 2003). "The 'university of holy war'". BBC News.
- Matinuddin, Kamal (1999). The Taliban Phenomenon, Afghanistan 1994–1997. Oxford University Press.
- Martin, Richard C. (2004). Encyclopedia of Islam and the Muslim World. Macmillan Reference USA.
- Giustozzi, Antonio (2019). The Taliban at War: 2001–2018. Oxford University Press. ISBN 978-0-19-009239-9.
- Burns, John F. (26 May 1997). "In Afghanistan, a Triumph of Fundamentalism". The New York Times. ISSN 0362-4331.
- Fitchett, Joseph (26 September 2001). "What About the Taliban's Stingers?". The International Herald Tribune. Archived from the original on 17 October 2016.
- West, Julian (23 September 2001). "Pakistan's godfathers of the Taliban hold the key to the hunt for Bin Laden". London: Daily Telegraph.
- Gall, Carlotta (3 March 2010). "Former Pakistani officer embodies policy puzzle". New York Times.
- Coll, Steve (3 March 2005). Ghost Wars: The Secret History of the CIA, Afghanistan and Bin Laden. Penguin UK. ISBN 978-0-14-193579-9.
- Goodson, Larry (2001). Afghanistan's Endless War. University of Washington Press. ISBN 0-295-98050-8.
- Rashid, Ahmed (2000). Taliban: Militant Islam, Oil, and Fundamentalism in Central Asia. Yale University Press, New Haven, CT. ISBN 0-300-08340-8., republished by Pan Books with the title Taliban: The story of the Afghan warlords: including a new foreword following the terrorist attacks of 11 September 2001, ISBN 0-330-49221-7. Page citations are to the Pan Books edition.
- Rashid, Ahmed (13 April 2010). Taliban: Militant Islam, Oil and Fundamentalism in Central Asia. Yale University Press. ISBN 978-0-3006368-1.
- Berman, Eli (2009). Radical, religious, and violent: the new economics of terrorism. MIT Press. p. 132. ISBN 978-0-262-02640-6.
- Hosseini, Khaled (2001). The Kite Runner. Riverhead Books. ISBN 1-57322-245-3.
