= Abdul Rahim Ghafoorzai =

Afghan politician and diplomat (c.1947–1997)

- عبدالرحیم غفورزی

Prime Minister of Afghanistan
- In office 11 August 1997 – 21 August 1997; Disputed by Mohammad Rabbani
- President: Burhanuddin Rabbani
- Preceded by: Gulbuddin Hekmatyar
- Succeeded by: Mohammad Rabbani (Islamic Emirate) continues serving

Foreign Minister of Afghanistan
- In office 1996 – 21 August 1997; Disputed by Mohammad Ghous
- President: Burhannudin Rabbani
- Preceded by: Najibullah Lafraie
- Succeeded by: Mohammad Ghous (Islamic Emirate) continues serving

Personal details
- Born: 1947
- Died: 21 August 1997 (aged 49-50) Bamyan, Islamic Emirate of Afghanistan

Abdul Rahim Ghafoorzai (Pashto: عبدالرحیم غفورزی ; c.1947 – 21 August 1997) was a politician and diplomat of Afghanistan. He was an ethnic Pashtun, a member of the Barakzai Mohammadzai tribe.

During the 1970s he entered the Afghan foreign service. He was sent to the United States to represent the political administration supported by the Soviet Union. As the ambassador to the United Nations, Ghafoorzai thought it his duty to call on global partners to denounce the Soviet invasion in 1979. From then until 1992, he worked to encourage international opposition to the regime that the Soviets had set up in Afghanistan.

When the communist government fell in 1992, Ghafoorzai acted as an intermediary to unite the contending factions. He worked in the United Nations until 1995 and then became deputy foreign minister. He became foreign minister in July 1996.

In September 1996 the government troops withdrew from Kabul and the Taliban captured Afghanistan's capital, Kabul. The international community, other than Pakistan, the United Arab Emirates and Saudi Arabia, did not recognize the Taliban as Afghanistan's legitimate government. The new Islamic State of Afghanistan government established the new cabinet in Mazar e Sharif in the north of Afghanistan, meanwhile the Afghanistan embassies and the permanent mission of Afghanistan to the United Nations were in control of Islamic State of Afghanistan as the legitimate representative of Afghanistan. Ghafoorzai continued as Afghanistan's foreign minister until 11 August 1997.

Just ten days before his death, he was appointed prime minister of the Islamic State of Afghanistan government. He was killed when the Antonov An-32 plane he was travelling on crashed in Bamyan Airport, near the city of Bamyan, where he was going to negotiate with allies to form his cabinet.

Political offices
Preceded by Najibullah Lafraie	— DISPUTED — Foreign Minister of Afghanistan; 1996–1997; Disputed by Mohammad Ghous; Reason for dispute: Afghan Civil War (1996–2001)	Succeeded by Mohammad Ghous (Islamic Emirate) continues serving
Preceded by Gulbuddin Hekmatyar	— DISPUTED — Prime Minister of Afghanistan; 1997; Disputed by Mohammad Rabbani; Reason for dispute: Afghan Civil War (1996–2001)	Succeeded by Mohammad Rabbani (Islamic Emirate) continues serving
