= Najibullah Lafraie =

Afghan politician

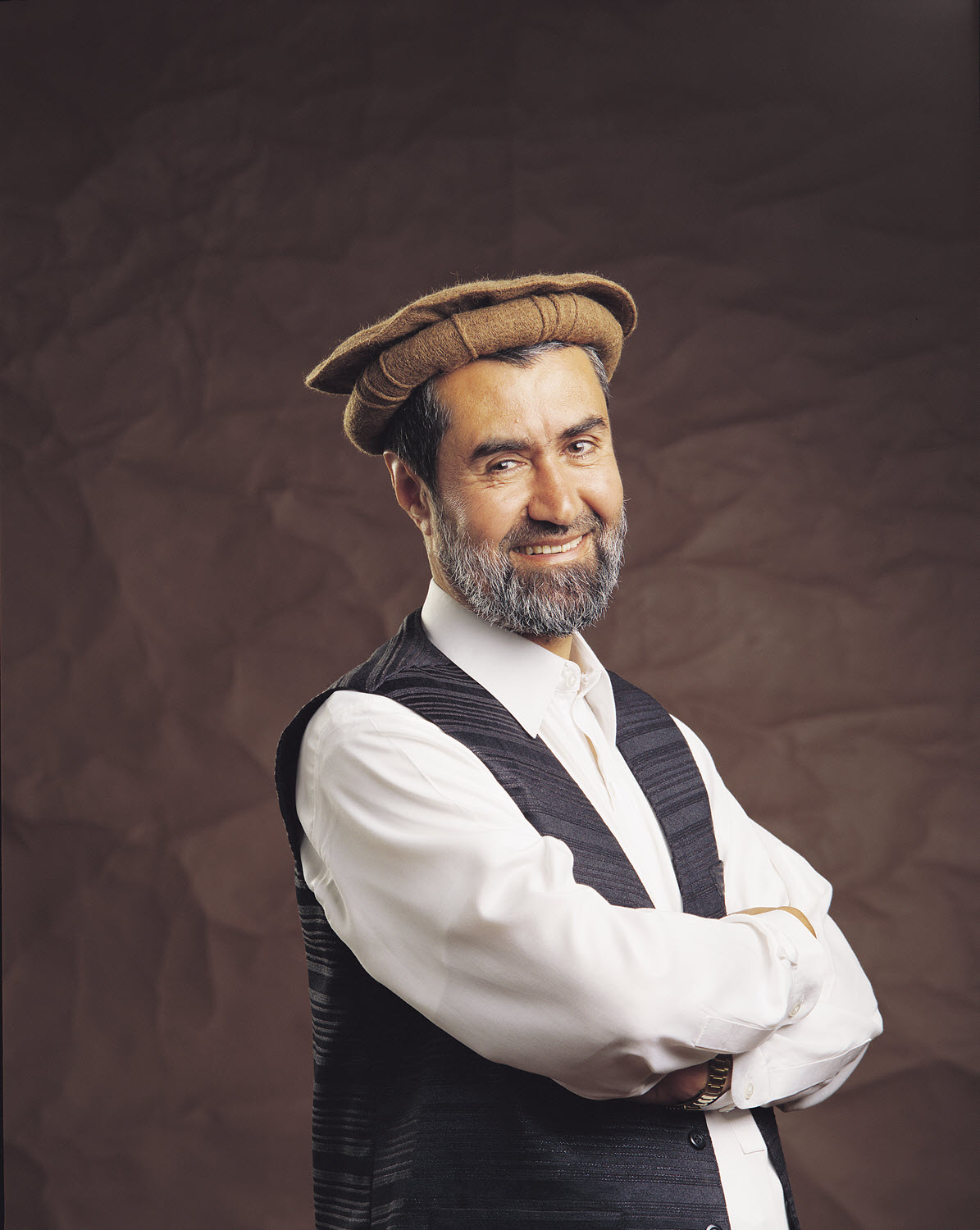
Najibullah Lafraie

Najibullah Lafraie (born 1948) was the Minister of State for Foreign Affairs of Afghanistan between 1992 and 1996.

== Education ==
Lafraie obtained a BA in Law and Political Science from Kabul University. He later completed an MA and Ph.D. in political science from the University of Hawaii.

== Career ==
Lafraie returned to Afghanistan and joined the Afghan liberation movement against the Soviet invasion during the 1980s.

Lafraie was appointed as Minister of Information in the Interim Government of Afghanistan in 1989 and as Minister of State for Foreign Affairs in the Islamic State of Afghanistan in 1992. He served in that position until the Taliban seized Kabul in September 1996.

Lafraie and his family fled to Australasia in the late 1990s. He was refused refugee status in Australia in 1999. In September 2000 he was granted refugee status in New Zealand. He currently lectures in the Politics Department at the University of Otago.

== Criticism ==
Lafraie has been criticised by the Revolutionary Association of the Women of Afghanistan and Support Association for the Women of Afghanistan for his membership of Jamiat Islami, a group allegedly responsible for various atrocities during the 1990s.

At the time of being granted refugee status, the then leader of the New Zealand opposition Jenny Shipley criticised Lafraie's involvement with the Afghan government and disagreed with the decision to grant him refugee status.
