= Afghan Civil War (1996–2001) =

1996–2001 civil war in Afghanistan

Third Afghan Civil War
- Part of the Afghan conflict
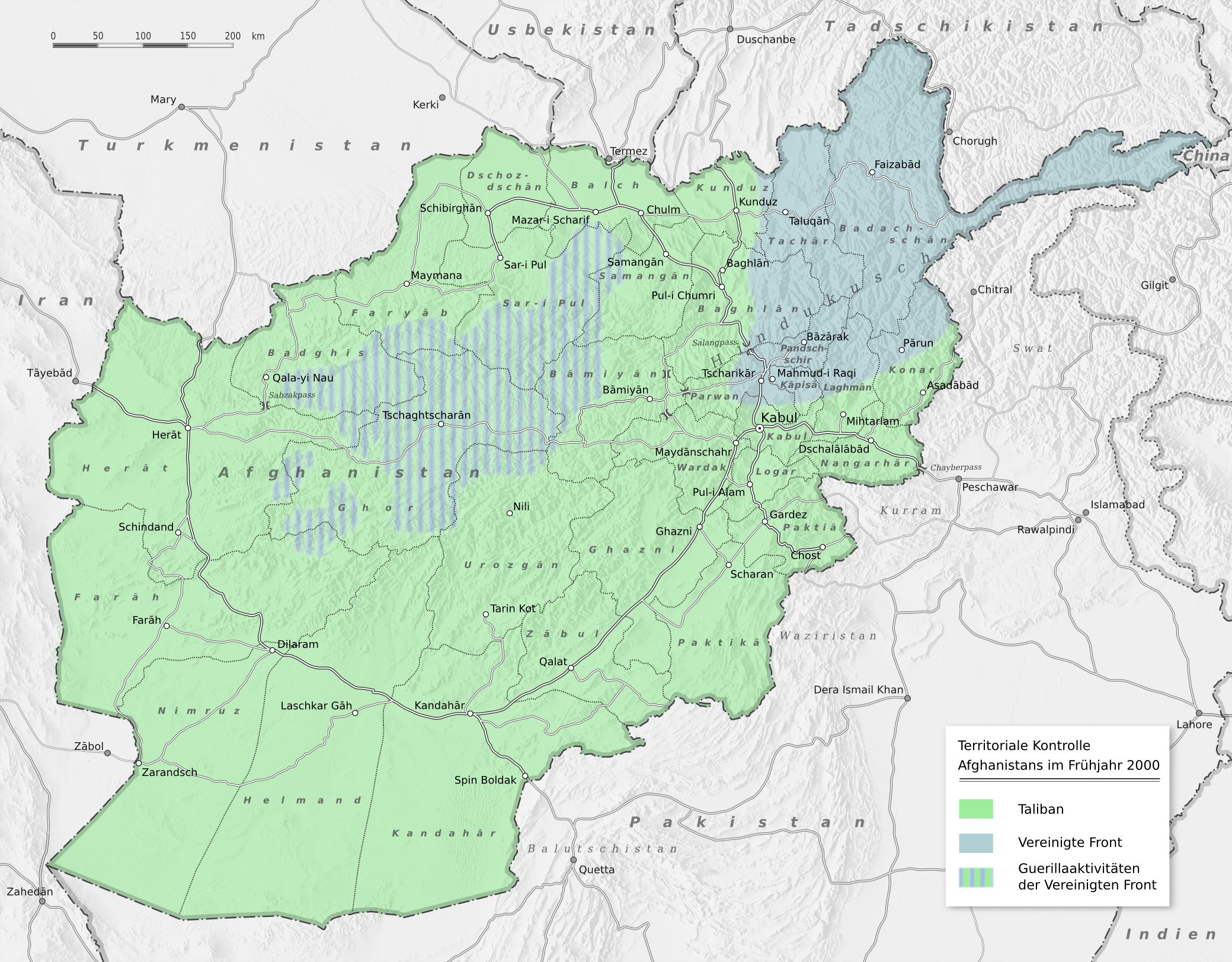
- Military situation in Afghanistan in 2000, between the Taliban (green) and the Northern Alliance (blue)
Date	27 September 1996 – 7 October 2001 (5 years, 1 week and 3 days)
Location	Afghanistan
Result	Stalemate: Invasion of Afghanistan by the U.S. in 2001; War continues
Territorial changes	The Taliban controls 85% of Afghanistan, including the capital Kabul

Belligerents
Islamic State of Afghanistan; (Islamic State of Afghanistan) National Front	Islamic Emirate of Afghanistan; Taliban; (Taliban) Haqqani network; Al-Qaeda; Islamic Movement of Uzbekistan

Commanders and leaders
(Afghanistan) Burhanuddin Rabbani; (Afghanistan) Ahmad Shah Massoud X; (Afghanistan) Mohammad Qasim Fahim; (Afghanistan) Atta Muhammad Nur; (Afghanistan) Atiqullah Baryalai; (Afghanistan) Ismail Khan; (Afghanistan) Bismillah Khan Mohammadi; (Afghanistan) Abdul Rashid Dostum; (Afghanistan) Abdulrab Rasul Sayyaf; (Afghanistan) Abdul Haq; (Afghanistan) Haji Abdul Qadeer; (Afghanistan) Asif Mohseni; (Afghanistan) Sayed Hussein Anwari; (Afghanistan) Muhammad Mohaqiq; (Afghanistan) Karim Khalili	(Islamic Emirate of Afghanistan (1996–2001)) Mullah Omar; (Islamic Emirate of Afghanistan (1996–2001)) Abdul Ghani Baradar; (Islamic Emirate of Afghanistan (1996–2001)) Mohammad Rabbani; (Islamic Emirate of Afghanistan (1996–2001)) Obaidullah Akhund; (Islamic Emirate of Afghanistan (1996–2001)) Dadullah Akhund; (Islamic Emirate of Afghanistan (1996–2001)) Jalaluddin Haqqani; (al-Qaeda) Osama bin Laden; (al-Qaeda) Ayman al-Zawahiri

Units involved
(Afghanistan) Northern Alliance; Jamiat-e Islami; Junbish-i Milli; (Afghanistan) Harakat-e Islami; (Afghanistan) IDOA; Hezb-e Wahdat; (Afghanistan) Eastern Shura; (Afghanistan) Shura-e Nazar	Afghan Armed Forces; Taliban; Haqqani network; Al-Qaeda; (al-Qaeda) 055 Brigade; Islamic Movement of Uzbekistan

Casualties and losses
- 35,775 killed

The 1996–2001 Afghan Civil War, also known as the Third Afghan Civil War, took place between the Taliban's conquest of Kabul and their establishing of the Islamic Emirate of Afghanistan on 27 September 1996, and the U.S. invasion of Afghanistan on 7 October 2001: a period that was part of the Afghan Civil Wars that had started in 1989, and also part of the conflict (in wider sense) in Afghanistan that had started in 1978.

The Islamic State of Afghanistan government remained the recognized government of Afghanistan by most of the international community. The Taliban's Islamic Emirate government, however, received recognition from Saudi Arabia, Pakistan and the United Arab Emirates.

The defense minister of the Islamic State of Afghanistan, Ahmad Shah Massoud, created the United Islamic Front for the Salvation of Afghanistan (Northern Alliance) in opposition to the Taliban. The United Front included all Afghan ethnicities: Tajiks, Uzbeks, Hazaras, Turkmens, some Pashtuns and others. During the conflict, the Taliban received military support from Pakistan and financial support from Saudi Arabia. Al-Qaeda supported the Taliban with thousands of local and foreign fighters from Pakistan, Arab countries, and Central Asia.

== Main participants ==
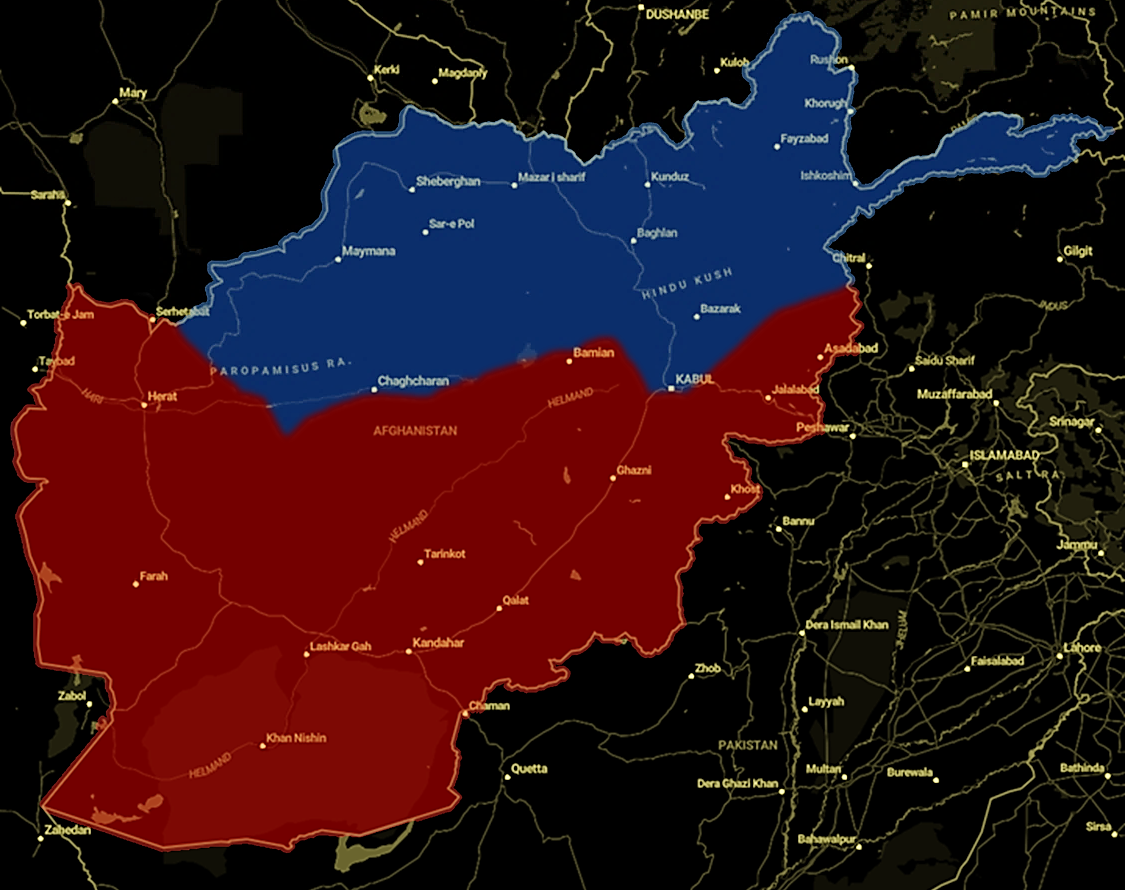
The territorial control of the Taliban (red) and the Northern Alliance (blue) in Afghanistan in 1996

Ahmad Shah Massoud (for the United Islamic Front for the Salvation (Northern Alliance) and the Islamic State of Afghanistan), Mullah Omar (for the Taliban) and Osama bin Laden together with Ayman al-Zawahiri (for al-Qaeda and different Arab interests) were the main leaders of the war residing in Afghanistan. There were other leaders, mainly from Pakistan (like Pervez Musharraf and later General Mahmud Ahmed) on the one side and from the United Front (i. e. Haji Abdul Qadeer, Abdul Rashid Dostum) on the other side, who, however, were not always present in Afghanistan itself. The quality of life of the Afghan population was heavily dependent on the specific leader who was directly controlling the area in which they lived. Sharp contrasts existed regarding life and structures in different areas.

=== United Front (Northern Alliance) ===
==== Ahmad Shah Massoud ====
Throughout much of its operational history, the United Islamic Front for the Salvation of Afghanistan (Northern Alliance) was headed by Ahmad Shah Massoud, a Kabul University engineering student turned military leader who played a leading role in driving the Soviet army out of Afghanistan, earning him the nickname Lion of Panjshir. His followers also call him Āmer Sāheb-e Shahīd (Our Beloved Martyred Commander). The Wall Street Journal at that time dedicated one of its covers to Massoud, calling him "the Afghan who won the Cold War". Following the withdrawal of Soviet troops from Afghanistan and the subsequent collapse of the Soviet-backed government of Mohammad Najibullah, Massoud became the Defense Minister in 1992 under the government of Burhanuddin Rabbani. Following the rise of the Taliban in 1996, Massoud returned to the role of an armed opposition leader, serving as the military commander of the United Islamic Front.

Massoud was a deeply religious and spiritual person who strongly opposed the interpretations of Islam followed by the Taliban or Al-Qaeda. A Sunni Muslim, he also always carried a book of Sufi mystic al-Ghazali with him.

The Taliban repeatedly offered Massoud a position of power to make him stop his resistance. Massoud declined for he did not fight for the sake of power. He explained in one interview:

"The Taliban say come and accept the post of prime minister and be with us", and they would keep the highest office in the country, the presidentship. But for what price?! The difference between us concerns mainly our way of thinking about the very principles of the society and the state. We can not accept their conditions of compromise, or else we would have to give up the principles of modern democracy. We are fundamentally against the system called "the Emirate of Afghanistan".

Massoud was convinced that only a democratic system could ensure a lasting peace in Afghanistan. He wanted to convince the Taliban to join a political process leading towards democratic elections in a foreseeable future.

On September 9, 2001, two days before the September 11 attacks in the United States, Massoud was assassinated in Takhar Province of Afghanistan by suspected al-Qaeda agents. The funeral, although taking place in a rather rural area, was attended by hundreds of thousands of mourning people. The following year, he was named "National Hero" by the order of Afghan President Hamid Karzai. The date of his death, September 9, is observed as a national holiday in Afghanistan, known as "Massoud Day". The year following his assassination, in 2002, Massoud was nominated for the Nobel Peace Prize (which, incidentally, is never awarded posthumously).

One refugee, who cramped his family of 27 into an old jeep to flee from the Taliban to the area of Massoud, described Massoud's territory as "the last tolerant corner of Afghanistan". About his life in Massoud's area he stated: "I feel freedom here. I like ... you know, nobody bothers me. I do my job. I take care of my family. The way which I like I live in this area." Massoud had no influence on the lives of people living in the areas of Abdul Rashid Dostum who had joined the United Front to fight the Taliban.

In Massoud's area, women and girls did not have to wear the Afghan burqa. They were allowed to work and to go to school. In at least two known instances, Massoud personally intervened against cases of forced marriage. While it was Massoud's stated conviction that men and women are equal and should enjoy the same rights, he also had to deal with Afghan traditions, which he said would need a generation or more to overcome. In his opinion, that could be achieved only through education.

Massoud created democratic institutions that were structured into several committees: political, health, education and economic. Still, many people came to him personally when they had a dispute or problem and asked him to solve their problems.

Hundreds of thousands of refugees fled the Taliban to the areas of Massoud. In 2001, Massoud and photographer and former UN ambassador Reza Deghati described the bitter situation of the Afghan refugees and asked for humanitarian help.

==== Abdul Rashid Dostum ====
Following the rise of the Islamic Emirate of Afghanistan and their capture of Kabul, Abdul Rashid Dostum aligned himself with the Northern Alliance (United Front) against the Taliban. The Northern Alliance was assembled in late 1996 by Dostum, Ahmad Shah Massoud and Karim Khalili against the Taliban. At this point he is said to have had a force of some 50,000 men supported by both aircraft and tanks.

Much like other Northern Alliance leaders, Dostum also faced infighting within his group and was later forced to surrender his power to General Abdul Malik Pahlawan. Malik entered into secret negotiations with the Taliban, who promised to respect his authority over much of northern Afghanistan, in exchange for the apprehension of Ismail Khan, one of their enemies. Accordingly, on 25 May 1997, Malik arrested Khan, handed him over and let the Taliban enter Mazar-i-Sharif, giving them control over most of northern Afghanistan. Because of this, Dostum was forced to flee to Turkey. However, Malik soon realized that the Taliban were not sincere with their promises as he saw his men being disarmed. He then rejoined the Northern Alliance, and turned against his erstwhile allies, driving them from Mazar-i-Sharif. In October 1997, Dostum returned from exile and retook charge. After Dostum briefly regained control of Mazar-i-Sharif, the Taliban returned in 1998 and he again fled to Turkey.

==== Haji Abdul Qadeer ====
Haji Abdul Qadeer (c. 1951 in Jalalabad, Afghanistan – July 6, 2002 in Kabul, Afghanistan) (Arabic: الحاج عبد القادر) was a prominent Pashtun anti-Taliban leader in the United Front. He was the brother of Abdul Haq, a well-known resistance leader against the Soviet invasion of Afghanistan. Qadeer's family was a traditionally powerful one, with ties to former Afghan king Mohammed Zahir Shah. Haji Abdul Qadeer had a base of power in the east of Afghanistan and was the governor of his home province of Nangarhar before the Taliban took power.

Qadeer became the Vice President of Afghanistan in the post-Taliban administration of Hamid Karzai. On July 6, 2002, Qadeer and his son-in-law were killed by gunmen. Another of his sons, Haji Mohammed Zaher, was shot dead in Kabul also in 2002.

=== Islamic Emirate of Afghanistan (Taliban) ===
Mohammed Omar headed the Taliban forces during the Afghan civil war. Mullah Omar declared himself Amir-ul-Momineen (Commander of the Faithful). was rarely photographed and rarely spoke to journalists directly. Many saw Mullah Omar as a nominal figure trained and controlled by Pakistan's intelligence agency, the ISI.

Followers of the Taliban claim that Mullah Omar was born in the central province of Uruzgan, in 1962. Other sources place his birth in Kandahar, c. 1959. They also say that he studied in several Islamic schools outside of Afghanistan, especially in Quetta, Pakistan. In the 1980s he joined the resistance against the Soviet invasion. It is believed that he lost his eye fighting the Soviets as a deputy Chief Commander in the Harakat-i Islami party of Mohammad Nabi Mohammadi. In 1994, Mullah Omar seized power in Kandahar by overthrowing the local gangs and militias in a first appearance of the Taliban movement.

Mullah Omar had strong links with another popular figure in world politics: Osama bin Laden. He was married to one of bin Laden's daughters. He refused several US requests to hand over Osama bin Laden, who was killed in May 2011 in a covert operation conducted by members of the United States Naval Special Warfare Development Group and Central Intelligence Agency SAD/SOG operators on the orders of U.S. President Barack Obama.

Analysis from the Physicians for Human Rights (PHR) states: "The Taliban is the first faction laying claim to power in Afghanistan that has targeted women for extreme repression and punished them brutally for infractions. To PHR's knowledge, no other regime in the world has methodically and violently forced half of its population into virtual house arrest, prohibiting them on pain of physical punishment ..."

After taking control of the capital city of Kabul on September 27, 1996, the Taliban issued edicts forbidding women to work outside the home, attend school, or to leave their homes unless accompanied by a male relative. In public, women had to be covered from head to toe in a burqa – a body-length covering with only a mesh opening to see through. Women were not permitted to wear white socks or shoes, or shoes that make a noise while they are being walked in. Also, houses and buildings had to have their windows painted over so women could not be seen inside. Women were practically banned from public life, denied access to health care, education, and work and they were not allowed to laugh in a manner they could be heard by others.

The Taliban, without any real court or hearing, cut people's hands or arms off when accused of theft. Taliban hit-squads from the infamous "Ministry for Promotion of Virtue and Prevention of Vice" watched the streets conducting brutal, public beatings of people when they saw what they considered as un-Islamic behavior.

=== Pakistan ===
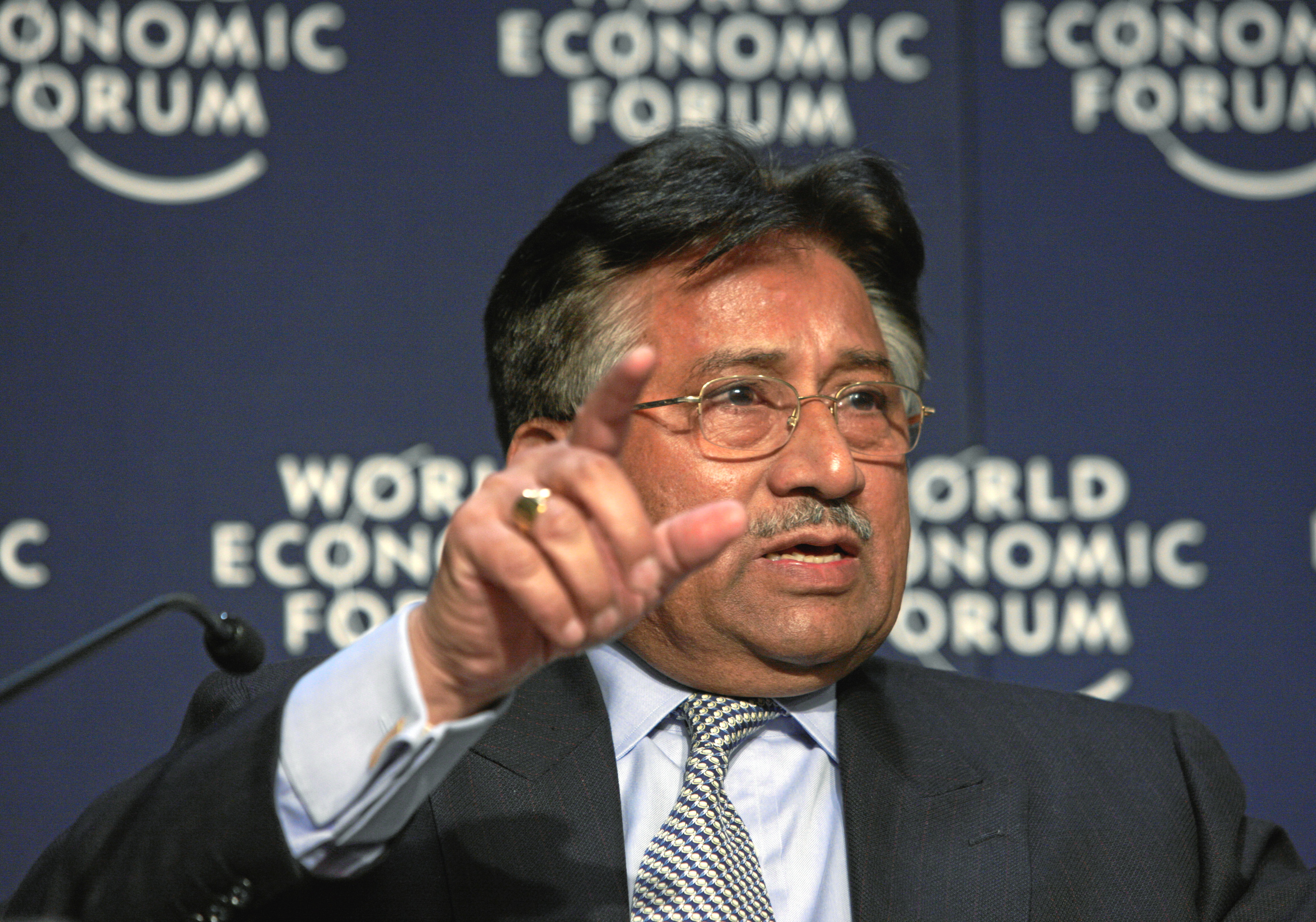
Former Pakistani President Pervez Musharraf

General Pervez Musharraf, a retired four-star general who served as Chairman of Joint Chiefs of Staff Committee from 1998 to 2001 and the Chief of Army Staff of Pakistan Army from 1998 to 2007, played an instrumental role in drafting Pakistan's role in the Afghan civil war. In 2001, he would go on to become Pakistan's military ruler and President as well. General Pervez Musharraf was responsible for sending thousands of Pakistani nationals to fight alongside the Taliban and bin Laden against Ahmad Shah Massoud. In total there were believed to be 28,000 Pakistani nationals fighting inside Afghanistan against the forces of Massoud. 20,000 were regular Pakistani soldiers either from the Frontier Corps, 50th Airborne Division or 12th regular army regiments, and an estimated 8,000 were militants recruited in madrassas filling regular Taliban ranks. The estimated 25,000 Taliban regular force thus comprised more than 8,000 Pakistani nationals. A 1998 document by the U.S. State Department confirms that "20–40 percent of [regular] Taliban soldiers are Pakistani." The document further states that the parents of those Pakistani nationals "know nothing regarding their child's military involvement with the Taliban until their bodies are brought back to Pakistan." A further 3,000 fighter of the regular Taliban army were Arab and Central Asian militants. Of roughly 45,000 Pakistani, Taliban and Al Qaeda soldiers fighting against the forces of Massoud only 14,000 were Afghan (Taliban).

Observers interviewed by Human Rights Watch in Afghanistan and Pakistan reported that Pakistan Army Aviation Corps 4th Army Aggressor Squadron's surveillance aircraft assisted Taliban forces during combat operations in late 2000, and that senior members of Pakistan's intelligence agency and army were involved in planning major Taliban military operations. As the war progressed, Pakistan Army deployed its 50th Airborne Division and the Frontier Corps to provide logistic support to Taliban campaigns against the Massoud's forces.

Peter Tomsen stated that up until 9/11 Pakistani military and ISI officers along with thousands of regular Pakistani armed forces personnel had been involved in the fighting in Afghanistan.

Human Rights Watch wrote in 2000:

"Of all the foreign powers involved in efforts to sustain and manipulate the ongoing fighting [in Afghanistan], Pakistan is distinguished both by the sweep of its objectives and the scale of its efforts, which include soliciting funding for the Taliban, bankrolling Taliban operations, providing diplomatic support as the Taliban's virtual emissaries abroad, arranging training for Taliban fighters, recruiting skilled and unskilled manpower to serve in Taliban armies, planning and directing offensives, providing and facilitating shipments of ammunition and fuel, and ... directly providing combat support."

In 1998, Iran accused Pakistani commandos of "war crimes at Bamiyan". The same year, Russia said Pakistan was responsible for the "military expansion" of the Taliban in northern Afghanistan by sending large numbers of Pakistani troops, including ISI personnel, some of whom had subsequently been taken as prisoners by the anti-Taliban United Islamic Front for the Salvation of Afghanistan (aka Northern Alliance).

=== Al-Qaeda ===
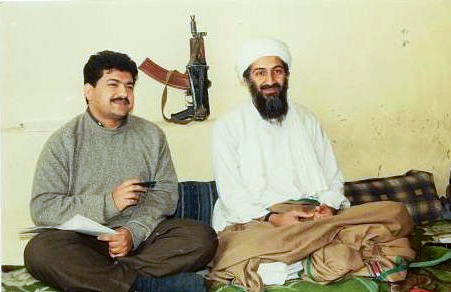
Pakistani journalist Hamid Mir interviewing Osama bin Laden in Afghanistan in 1997

Osama bin Laden was a member of the prominent Saudi bin Laden family and the founding leader of Al-Qaeda. After the attacks on September 11, 2001 (in which nearly 3,000 people were killed in the U.S.), Osama bin Laden and his organization became major targets of the United States' war on terror. Bin Laden himself was killed in Pakistan on May 2, 2011, shortly after 1:00 a.m. local time by U.S. special operations forces.

Ayman al-Zawahiri was the second and last "emir" of Egyptian Islamic Jihad. In 1998 al-Zawahiri formally merged Egyptian Islamic Jihad into bin Laden's organization. He is often described as a "lieutenant" to Osama bin Laden, though bin Laden's chosen biographer has referred to him as the "real brains" of al-Qaeda. On July 31, 2022, al-Zawahiri was killed in a U.S. drone strike in Afghanistan.

From 1996 to 2001 Osama bin Laden and Ayman al-Zawahiri became a virtual state within the Taliban state. Bin Laden sent Arab fighters to join the fight against the United Front, especially his so-called 055 Brigade. Arab militants under bin Laden were responsible for some of the worst massacres in the war, killing hundreds of civilians in areas controlled by the United Front. A report by the United Nations quotes eyewitnesses in many villages describing Arab fighters carrying long knives used for slitting throats and skinning people. Meanwhile, fighters of bin Laden's Brigade 055 were known for committing collective suicide before running risk of being taken prisoners by enemy forces themselves.

==== Strategic Cooperation with the Islamic Movement of Uzbekistan (IMU) ====
The Islamic Movement of Uzbekistan (IMU) is a militant group formed in 1991 with strong ties to Al Qaeda. It is estimated that the IMU in the late 1990s was approximately 2000 men strong, and that they contributed around 600 fighters to the Taliban's offensive against Massoud, participating in the siege of Taloqan, where they fought alongside bin Laden's 055 Brigade. It is unknown if the IMU directly worked with the Taliban or had any ties to them, given that the Taliban were ethnic Pashtuns who were pitted against the non-Pashtun ethnicities of Afghanistan. In 2001 the IMU was largely destroyed while fighting alongside the Taliban against the United States-led coalition forces in Afghanistan. An unknown number of their fighters escaped with remnants of the Taliban to Waziristan in Pakistan where they created a follow-up organization. The IMU's longterm leader Tahir Yuldashev was killed as a result of an August 27, 2009, U.S. predator airstrike in South Waziristan. Abu Usman succeeded him as the new leader of the IMU. Today there are an estimated 2,500 to 4,000 IMU fighters based in Pakistan's tribal regions and in Afghanistan.

== Background and history ==
=== Taliban rise to power ===
After the fall of the communist Najibullah-regime in 1992, the Afghan political parties agreed on a peace and power-sharing agreement (the Peshawar Accords). The Peshawar Accords created the Islamic State of Afghanistan. From the first day of its founding until late 1994, the newly created Islamic State of Afghanistan (ISA) came under attack by Gulbuddin Hekmatyar's Hezb-e Islami Gulbuddin militia armed, financed and instructed by neighboring Pakistan. Afghanistan expert Amin Saikal concludes in Modern Afghanistan: A History of Struggle and Survival:

Pakistan was keen to gear up for a breakthrough in Central Asia. [...] Islamabad could not possibly expect the new Islamic government leaders [...] to subordinate their own nationalist objectives in order to help Pakistan realize its regional ambitions. [...] Had it not been for the ISI's logistic support and supply of a large number of rockets, Hekmatyar's forces would not have been able to target and destroy half of Kabul.

Abdul Rashid Dostum and his Junbish-i Milli militia joined an alliance with Gulbuddin Hekmatyar in early 1994. In addition, Saudi Arabia and Iran – as competitors for regional hegemony – supported Afghan militias hostile towards each other. According to Human Rights Watch, Iran was assisting the Shia Hazara Hezb-i Wahdat forces of Abdul Ali Mazari, as Iran was attempting to maximize Wahdat's military power and influence. Saudi Arabia supported the Wahhabite Abdul Rasul Sayyaf and his Ittihad-i Islami faction. Conflict between the two militias soon escalated into a full-scale war. The capital city Kabul saw extremely violent fighting during that period. Power was highly decentralized.

Meanwhile, southern Afghanistan was neither under the control of foreign-backed militias nor the government in Kabul, but was ruled by local leaders such as Gul Agha Sherzai and their militias. In 1994, the Taliban (a movement originating from Jamiat Ulema-e-Islam-run religious schools for Afghan refugees in Pakistan) also developed in Afghanistan as a politico-religious force, reportedly in opposition to the tyranny of the local governor. In 1994, the Taliban took power in several provinces in southern and central Afghanistan.

Late 1994, Kabul witnessed some weeks of relative calm, followed by resumed heavy shelling. Islamic State's Secretary of Defense Ahmad Shah Massoud tried to initiate a nationwide political process with the goal of national consolidation and democratic elections, also inviting the Taliban to join the process. The Taliban declined. They started shelling Kabul in early 1995 but were defeated by forces of the Islamic State government under Secretary of Defense Ahmad Shah Massoud. Amnesty International, referring to the Taliban offensive, wrote in a 1995 report:

This is the first time in several months that Kabul civilians have become the targets of rocket attacks and shelling aimed at residential areas in the city.

The Taliban's early victories in 1994 were followed by a series of defeats that resulted in heavy losses.

On September 26, 1996, as the Taliban prepared for another major offensive, Massoud ordered a full retreat from Kabul. The Taliban that day attacked Kabul. President Burhanuddin Rabbani, Gulbuddin Hekmatyar, Ahmad Shah Massoud and their troops withdrew from Kabul; the next day, 27 September, the Taliban occupied Kabul. Taliban's leader Mullah Omar appointed his deputy, Mohammad Rabbani, as head of a national ruling council which was called Islamic Emirate of Afghanistan. The Islamic State government remained the recognized government of Afghanistan of most of the international community, the Taliban's Islamic Emirate however received recognition from Saudi Arabia, Pakistan and the United Arab Emirates.

=== Creation of the United Front (Northern Alliance) ===
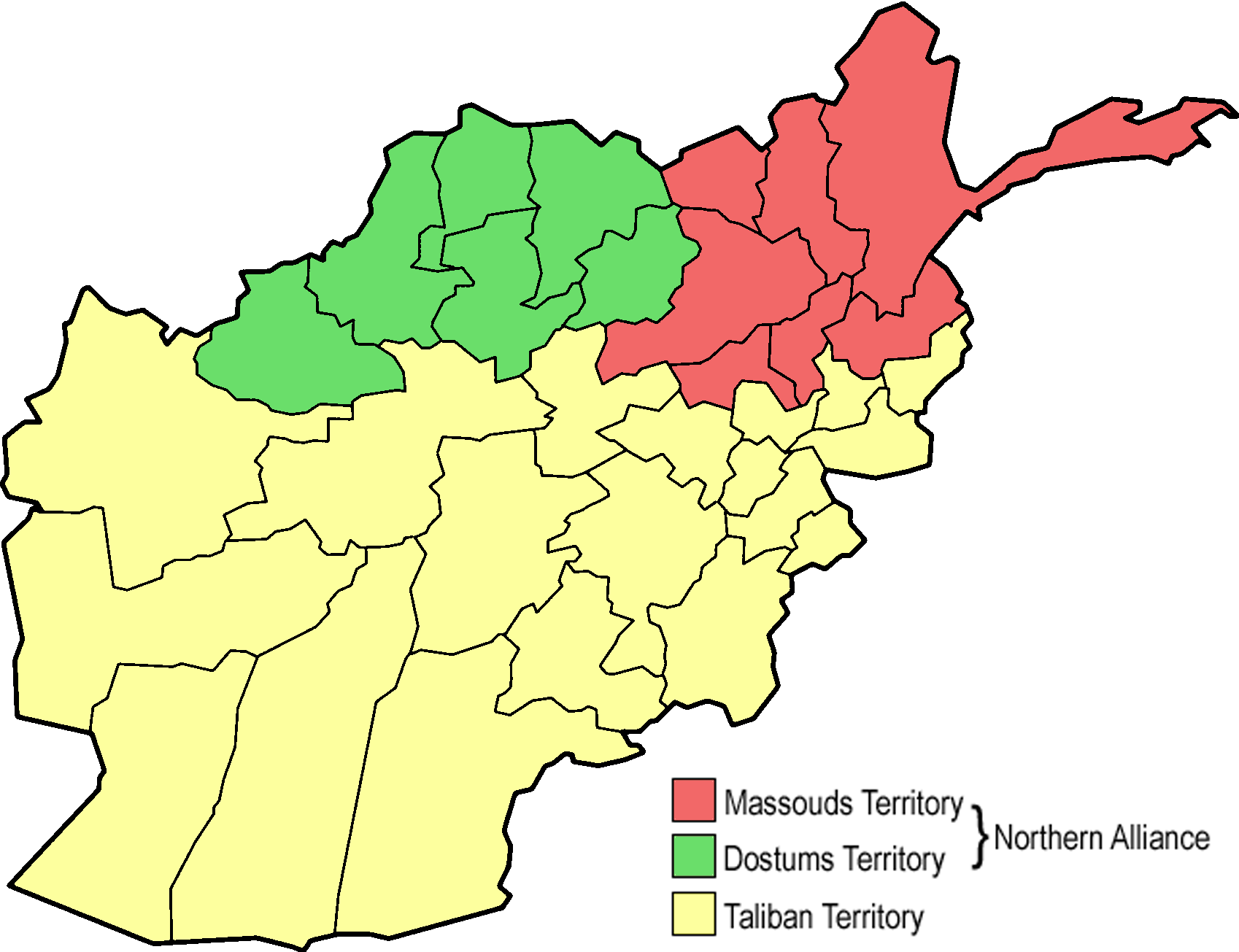
Map of the situation in Afghanistan in late 1996; Massoud/Rabbani (red), Dostum (green), Taliban (yellow)

Ahmad Shah Massoud and Abdul Rashid Dostum, two former archenemies, created the United Front (Northern Alliance) in September 1996, against the Taliban that were preparing offensives against the remaining areas under the control of Massoud and those under the control of Dostum. The United Front included beside the dominantly Tajik forces of Massoud and the Uzbek forces of Dostum, Hazara factions and Pashtun forces under the leadership of commanders such as Abdul Haq, Haji Abdul Qadeer, Qari Baba or diplomat Abdul Rahim Ghafoorzai. From the Taliban conquest in 1996 until November 2001 the United Front controlled roughly 30% of Afghanistan's population in provinces such as Badakhshan, Kapisa, Takhar and parts of Parwan, Kunar, Nuristan, Laghman, Samangan, Kunduz, Ghōr and Bamyan. This union did not consist of a "Northern Alliance" thus only the "northern states" of Afghanistan, but included resistance forces from all parts and all major ethnicities of the country.

Massoud did not intend for the United Front to become the ruling government of Afghanistan. His vision was for the United Front to help establish a new government, where the various ethnic groups would share power and live in peace through a democratic form of government.

=== Taliban massacres ===
According to a 55-page report by the United Nations, the Taliban, while trying to consolidate control over northern and western Afghanistan, committed systematic massacres against civilians. UN officials stated that there had been "15 massacres" between 1996 and 2001. They also said, that "[t]hese have been highly systematic and they all lead back to the [Taliban] Ministry of Defense or to Mullah Omar himself." The worst of these massacres was the 1998 Mazar-i-Sharif massacre, which systematically targeted members of the Shia Hazara community. Many civilians fled to the area of Massoud. The National Geographic concluded: "The only thing standing in the way of future Taliban massacres is Ahmad Shah Massoud." The 055 Brigade were also believed to be behind a string of civilian massacres of the Shia population nearby in Hazarajat, including one attack in early 2001, in which more than 200 people died.

=== Excerpts of the war ===
==== Panjshir ====
The Taliban, with the support of the Pakistan Army's 13th Regular Army and the 50th Airborne Division, launched an aggressive series of military operations against Panjshir and the surrounding areas. The Pakistan Army's 4th Army Aggressor Squadron provided the reconnaissance intelligence to the 13th Regular Army, 50th Airborne Division, and the Taliban forces. Meanwhile, Al-Qaeda and Arab Brigades launched their own military campaign to support the Taliban hoping to gain control of the Panjshir Valley. This operation, planned and launched under General Naseem Rana, was well planned, more organized and comprehensively studied by Pakistan Armed Forces.

Despite the large series of organized attack operations led by the General Rana of Pakistan Army and their Taliban allies, they were not able to subdue the Panjshir. Ahmad Shah Massoud, who had defeated the Soviet Union's 40th Army in his hometown before, successfully defended the Panjshir Valley, and diverted further assaults led by the 13th Regular Army and the 50th Airborne Division of Pakistan.

==== Kabul and Kunduz ====
The Islamic State's Secretary of Defense Ahmad Shah Massoud, who still represented the legitimate government as recognized by the international community and the United Nations, in 1997 summoned a conference under his leadership to decide on a future government and prime minister. The Pashtun Abdul Rahim Ghafoorzai, who was not affiliated with any party, was the candidate at that time and without dissenting votes was elected as new prime minister. Ghafoorzai's program was cordially received by wide sections of the population. A first step towards a new popular government was made. Massoud had the Afghan army equipped with newly acquired military uniforms and advanced after a few large offensives to the gates of Kabul. The alliance pushed forward with tanks, armored personnel carriers, and heavy weapons into the Bagram airbase, which was the first major victory against the Taliban since they lost Kabul. After making gains north of the capital, they met heavy resistance by Taliban forces inside Kabul. At the same time the new prime minister's airplane crashed over Bamiyan. By Ghafoorzai's death, Massoud lost his hope for a stable government in Kabul. Since Massoud no longer had a suitable government ready, he withdrew his troops from the north of Kabul. To avoid a dangerous repetition of the 1992-1994 period, he did not intend to march into Kabul without having formed a government which would be acceptable for all- especially for the civilian population.

Approximately 2,000 Taliban fighters in Kunduz were surrounded by forces of Massoud. These Taliban forces were able to survive when they allied with one of Abdul Rasul Sayyaf's former Ittihad-i Islami commanders. Mullah Amir Khan Muttaqi, who was among these men, led an attack on July 4, 1997, against the capital of Takhar, Taloqan, which was under the control of Massoud. Although the attack failed it produced difficulties for the United Front on another front.

==== Hazarajat ====
In November 1996, the Taliban besieged Hazarajat, hoping to capture the region and establish their rule there. After the early victory's of the Hazaras in Mazar-i-Sharif, the Hazaras were motivated to lift off the siege. Under the command of Karim Khalili, the Hazaras successfully lifted off the siege of Hazarajat. The Taliban besieged Hazarajat again, in which thousands of Hazaras starved. The Taliban allowed some food and aid to enter Hazarajat on 8 May 1998, in exchange of food supply going to Ghorband District, which was the front line of the Taliban during the fighting.

==== Mazar-i-Sharif ====
In May 1997, angry at Abdul Rashid Dostum's alleged involvement in the assassination of his brother, Abdul Malik Pahlawan and other commanders such as Qari Alam Rosekh, General Abdul Majid Rouzi and Ghafar Pahlawan met with Taliban commanders Mullah Abdul Razzaq and Mullah Ghaus in Baghdis. They agreed that Malik would betray Dostum, capture Ismail Khan and take control of the city of Mazar-i-Sharif. Malik attacked Dostum's forces in Jawzjan on May 22, 1997, and occupied Dostum's stronghold of Sheberghan. Most of Dostum's commanders defected and joined Malik and even some of his air force pilots joined the battle on Malik's side. Although the exact details of the agreement were not clear, it appears as if the Taliban had failed to take their part. On May 25, the Taliban entered Mazar-i-Sharif and began to close schools, offices and impose Sharia law. In the Hazara sections of the city, particularly in the north-east and east areas around Syedabad, local Hezb-i Wahdat commanders and armed "civilians" began to enlist themselves in resistance.

On May 22, 1997, fighting also broke out between Dostum's forces and the Taliban in Andkhoy and Khwaja Dokoh. Massoud sent reinforcements.

On May 30, heavy fighting broke out around Syedabad. Taliban fighters were ambushed. At this point, Malik changed allegiances allying his forces with Hezb-i Wahdat, taking thousands of Taliban soldiers as prisoners in Maimana, Sheberghan and Mazar-i-Sharif. The Taliban prisoners were summarily executed, reportedly under the supervision of Malik's brother General Gul Mohammad Pahlawan. Estimates of the total number killed were 3000. Furthermore, Junbish commanders such as Ghulam Haidar Jawzjani were also captured and killed, along with Salam Pahlawan and Rais Omar Bey. In the months following the defeat of the Taliban in Mazar-i-Sharif, Malik then proceeded to reincorporate troops loyal to Ismail Khan into the city's administration.

By July 1998 the Taliban had taken control of much of the area north of Herat, including the road linked to Maimana. The 055 Brigade of Al Qaeda was reported to have been used in the battle. On August 8, 1998, the Taliban re-entered Mazar-i-Sharif.

Some Hezb-e Islami Gulbuddin forces joined the Taliban during that time encircling the front lines of Hezb-i Wahdat at Qalai-Zaini-Takhta Pul. About 1,500 – 3,000 Wahdat fighters were trapped and killed by the Taliban and Hezb-e Islami Gulbuddin. Senior commanders of Wahdat such as Muhammad Muhaqiq evacuated by helicopter.

Junbish-i Milli infighting between Dostum's forces and those of Malik furthermore created opportunities for the Taliban. The Taliban were able to surround Mazar-i Sharif from the rear, capturing Hairatan directly across from Termez on September 20. The Taliban then proceeded to enter the city where they executed approximately 4,000 civilians mostly of Hazara ethnic or Shia religious background. The Taliban, for the next 6 days were reported to have gone door to door looking for male Hazara Shias and then subsequently executing them. Thousands of prisoners were transported by both sides in metal transport truck containers where many suffocated or died of heat stroke. One Taliban hit-squad, Sipah-i Sahaba, captured the Iranian consulate where they shot dead one journalist and 8 Iranian intelligence and diplomatic officers.

==== Return of Ismail Khan ====
In March 1997, Ismail Khan (United Front) returned from Iran. He led approximately 2,000 fighters to fight the Taliban in Badghis and push them to approximately 20 kilometres (12 mi) north of the Marghab River leading to Qala-i Naw. The Taliban's advance was halted but significant gains could not be made by either side.

==== Iran-Taliban Crisis ====
Among those killed in Mazar-i Sharif were several Iranian diplomats. Others were kidnapped by the Taliban, touching off a hostage crisis that nearly escalated to a full-scale war, with Iran amassing 70,000 Iranian soldiers on the Afghan border. It was later admitted that the diplomats were killed by the Taliban, and their bodies were returned to Iran. In September the Taliban claimed that Iran had violated its airspace. Later Iran claimed minor clashes had occurred between the Taliban and Iran after the Taliban had allegedly led a raid into eastern Iran, though the Taliban denied it led the raid. Eventually with UN mediation, the tensions cooled.

=== Assassination of Massoud ===
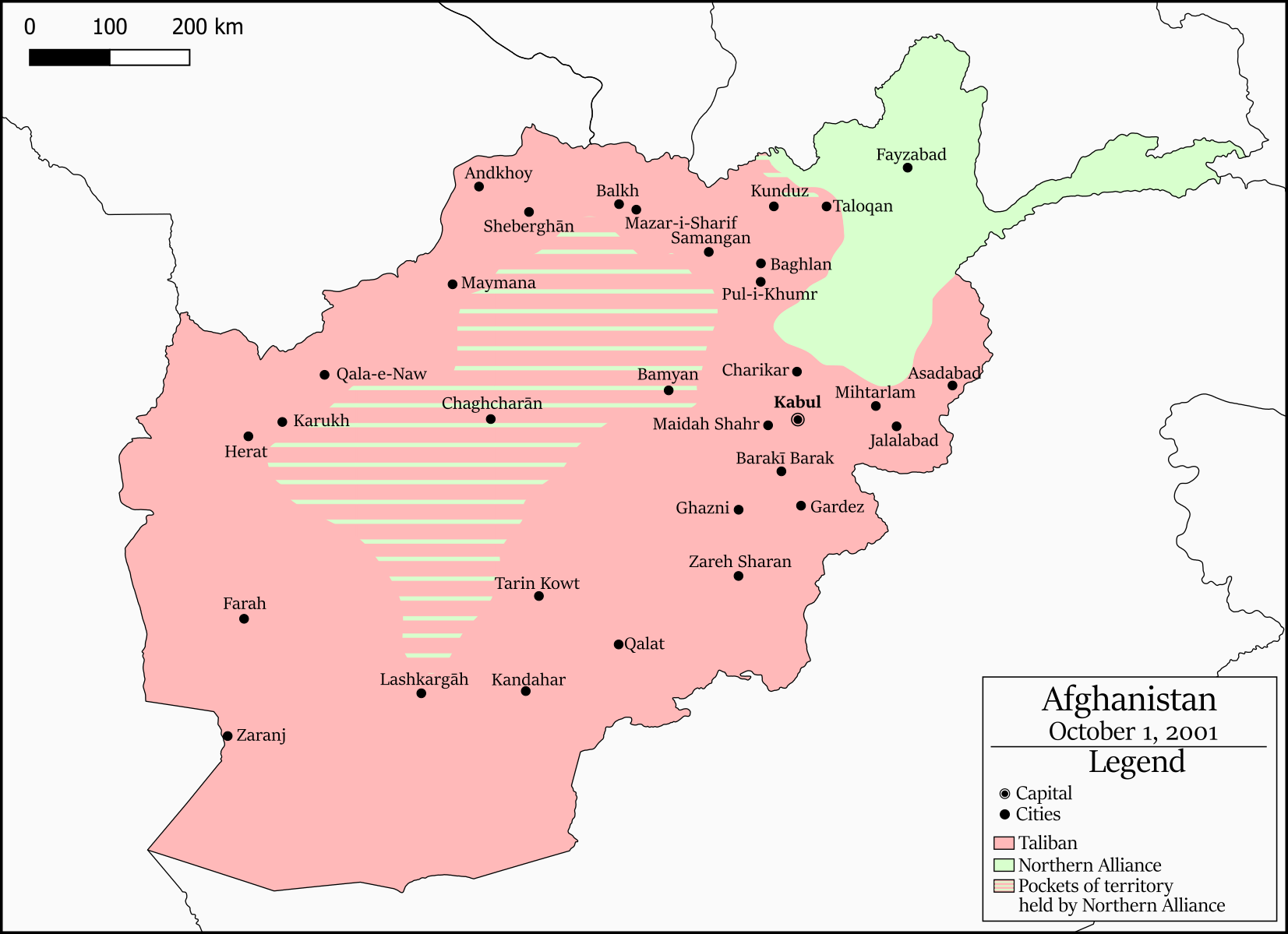
Map of the situation in Afghanistan on October 1, 2001, until the US and UK air attack on Afghanistan, October 7, 2001.

In early 2001 Massoud addressed the European Parliament in Brussels asking the international community to provide humanitarian help to the people of Afghanistan. He stated that the Taliban and Al Qaeda had introduced "a very wrong perception of Islam" and that without the support of Pakistan and bin Laden the Taliban would not be able to sustain their military campaign for up to a year. On this visit to Europe he also warned that his intelligence had gathered information about a large-scale attack on U.S. soil being imminent.

On September 9, 2001, two Arab suicide attackers allegedly belonging to Al Qaeda, posing as journalists, detonated a bomb hidden in a video camera while under the pretense of interviewing Ahmed Shah Massoud. Commander Massoud died in a helicopter that was taking him to a hospital.

In over 26 years Massoud had survived dozens of other assassination attempts by the Soviet KGB and the Afghan communist intelligence service, the Pakistani ISI, Gulbuddin Hekmatyar, the Taliban and Al Qaeda. For many days the United Front denied the death of Massoud for fear of desperation among their people. In the end, the slogan "Now we are all Massoud" became a unifying battle cry.

=== U.S. invasion ===
After the attacks of September 11, 2001 on U.S. soil, the United States and Britain launched an air assault on Afghanistan on 7 October 2001, which the Taliban referred to as an "attack on Islam". Ground troops of the United Front (Northern Alliance), supported by Iran, India, Tajikistan, Russia, Uzbekistan, Turkey and the United States' extensive bombing of Taliban forces and military infrastructure, in November and December 2001 ousted the Taliban from power in Kabul and gained control of much of the rest of the country.

== See also ==
- Timeline of Afghan history
- War in Afghanistan (2001–2021)
- Iran–Saudi Arabia proxy conflict
- War on terror

== Bibliography ==
- Casting Shadows: War Crimes and Crimes against Humanity: 1978-2001 (PDF) (Report). Afghanistan Justice Project. 2005.
- Coll, Steve (2004). Ghost Wars: The Secret History of the CIA, Afghanistan, and Bin Laden, from the Soviet Invasion to September 10, 2001. Penguin.
- Matinuddin, Kamal (1999). The Taliban Phenomenon: Afghanistan 1994–1997. Oxford University Press. ISBN 978-0-19-579274-4.
