= Mohammad Rabbani =

Prime Minister of Afghanistan from 1996 to 2001

Mullah Mohammad Rabbani محمد ربانی

Prime Minister of Afghanistan
- In office 27 September 1996 – 16 April 2001; Disputed by Gulbuddin Hekmatyar and Abdul Rahim Ghafoorzai until 21 August 1997
- Deputy: Hasan Akhund
- Leader: Mullah Omar
- Preceded by: Gulbuddin Hekmatyar
- Succeeded by: Abdul Kabir (acting)

Deputy Leader of the Islamic Emirate of Afghanistan
- In office 4 April 1996 – 16 April 2001
- Leader: Mullah Omar
- Preceded by: Office established
- Succeeded by: Abdul Ghani Baradar

Personal details
- Born: 1955 Pashmol, Kingdom of Afghanistan
- Died: 16 April 2001 (aged 45–46) Rawalpindi, Punjab, Pakistan
- Resting place: Martyr's Cemetery, Kandahar
- Occupation: Politician, Taliban member
- Political affiliation: Taliban

Mullah Mohammad Rabbani Akhund (Pashto: محمد رباني اخوند) (1955 – 16 April 2001) was an Afghan politician and one of the main leaders of the Taliban movement who served as Prime Minister of Afghanistan from 1996 to 2001. He was second in power only to the supreme leader, Mullah Mohammed Omar, in the Taliban hierarchy.

Rabbani fought the Soviet Union after it invaded Afghanistan in 1979. When the Soviet Union withdrew from Afghanistan in 1989, he initially stopped fighting. He joined the Taliban in 1994. After years of civil war, he led the Taliban guerrillas in the final assault against the capital, Kabul.

He served as Prime Minister of the Islamic Emirate of Afghanistan. There were also rumors that Mullah Rabbani and the head of the Taliban movement had serious political differences, though scholars such as Dorronsoro considered these differences to be overstated, if not contrived. While Rabbani and the ruling Leadership Council of Afghanistan constituted the public face of the country, the important decisions were made by Mullah Omar, who resided in the southern city of Kandahar.

== Early years ==
Rabbani was born in 1955. He was from the Kakar tribe of Pashtuns. He obtained Islamic education at home in Pashmol in Kandahar Province, before participating in an Islamic seminary. The invasion of Afghanistan by the Soviet Union in 1979 put a stop to his education as he volunteered for the jihad.

His role in the civil war ended when the Soviet Army withdrew in 1989, but other members and factions of the Afghan mujahidin fought on, first against the Afghan communist government and then against each other.

It was a time of lawlessness and chaos. The communist government fell in 1992 and Afghanistan was fought over by factions of the mujahedin. Kandahar was particularly a battleground for commanders turned warlords.

Rabbani and about thirty other religious students (Taliban) decided to take the warlords on, first in the border town of Spin Boldak and then in Kandahar itself. During this period, Rabbani argued "Our concern is the establishment of an Islamic system and the elimination of unrest and cruelty from our country."

== Fall of Kabul and creation of the Islamic Emirate ==
When United Nations Special Envoy Mehmoud Mestiri resumed his peace parleys in Afghanistan in March 1996, he had been assured by the political leadership of the Taliban, represented by Mullah Rabbani, who also commanded the forces encircling Kabul, that the Taliban were ready for discussions with the government of President Burhanuddin Rabbani.

Originally a Taliban idea endorsed by Pakistani Prime Minister Nawaz Sharif and accepted on behalf of the United Front (formerly the Northern Alliance) by Burhanuddin Rabbani in early January 1998, the proposal took shape as a proposed commission of ulema, or religious scholars, to settle the Afghan conflict in the light of the shariah. However, no progress was made until, once again, Sharif intervened two months later, in March, by inviting Mullah Rabbani, now head of the Taliban shura in Kabul, to Islamabad and obtained from him an agreement in principle for the convening of a steering committee in preparation for the ulema commission.

On 9 April, the United Nations Special Envoy went to Kabul and discussed with Mullah Rabbani and other Taliban leaders how to proceed with the idea of a steering committee for preparations for an ulema meeting. With this perceived shift in the Taliban's strategy, Mestiri had moved to Kabul to tie up other details. This would explain in large measure the Taliban's removal of heavy weaponry from areas surrounding Kabul very recently. But no sooner had Mullah Rabbani given this assurance to the visiting UN envoy, the religious leadership based in Kandahar rejected talks with Kabul, scuttling Mestiri's efforts and continuing the civil war.

On 26 September 1996 Taliban forces set up an interim government under Mohammed Rabbani, and Afghanistan was declared a complete Islamic emirate under Sharia law. It was Rabbani who gave the dramatic press conference from the presidential palace claiming victory.

Rabbani was the Taliban's second most powerful man and the leader of the moderates in the organization. However, there were differences between him and Mullah Omar regarding the influence of the Arabs and the need to establish a proper consultative government mechanism. Rabbani's power base was Jalalabad and he was not dependent on the Kandahari group for political support within the Taliban.

== Quotes about Osama Bin Laden ==
He declared to the international community that his government did not support terrorism.

We will not allow anyone to perform any terrorist acts inside or from Afghanistan against anyone. We are a free country where Osama is living as a guest. This is the reality and it is up to the world to accept it.

Mullah Rabbani noted that Osama bin Laden had taken up residence when Afghanistan was under the control of the previous regime. He also maintained that there was not sufficient evidence linking him to terrorist bombings in Nairobi and Dar es Salaam and that, at any rate, bin Laden was no longer able to carry out activities from Afghan territory.

== Decline and death ==
Rabbani died in a military hospital in Rawalpindi, Pakistan, of liver cancer on 16 April 2001. According to a press release in Islamabad:

Mullah Mohammad Rabbani was one of the main founders of the Movement and greatly contributed to peace and security in our country. His service to Islam is unforgettable. His demise is an irreparable loss.

Rabbani's body was repatriated to the southern Afghan city of Kandahar by a UN plane, permitted to operate on humanitarian grounds despite the air embargo against the Taliban Movement. He was buried in the Taliban's Martyr's Cemetery in Kandahar.

Regarding him as somewhat of a moderate, members of the opposition voiced fears that hardliners within the Taliban would strengthen their hold on power following Rabbani's death.

Political offices
Preceded by Gulbuddin Hekmatyar	Prime Minister of Afghanistan; 1996–2001; Disputed by Gulbuddin Hekmatyar and Abdul Rahim Ghafoorzai until 1997; Reason for dispute: Afghan Civil War (1996–2001)	Succeeded by Abdul Kabir (acting)
