= Andrew North (journalist) =

Journalist and writer

Andrew North is an English journalist and writer. For several years, he was the BBC's South Asia correspondent. North has been covering Afghanistan since 2001, and was based in Kabul for the BBC for many years. He has also worked in conflicts in Iraq, Libya, and Georgia. From 2021, he has written about the Taliban's return to power for a wide range of international publications, with repeated trips to the region. His work has appeared in Nikkei Asia, The Economist, Tortoise, Foreign Affairs, and The Guardian, and various other outlets.

North was nominated for the RTS Foreign Reporter of the Year award for his coverage of the 2008 Georgia-Russia war, for a Webby for his multi-media web story "The Big Draw: Selling the Soviet Past" on markets of left-over relics of the Soviet period in Georgia. Some of his work uses a mix of reportage and drawing. In 2022, North was also nominated for a Foreign Press Association (London) award, for "Afghanistan nightmare: a humanitarian crisis that threatens to dwarf all others", for Nikkei Asia, with Paula Bronstein.

North has been a speaker at various journalism festivals. His analysis has been cited in various books and articles, including on the culture of foreign correspondents and their relationship with fixers, and on the use of mobile phones by insurgents to spread their messaging.

North was the subject of wide coverage when he was detained by the Taliban in Kabul in February 2022, while working on an assignment for the United Nations. After being detained for several days, North was released and allowed to leave the country. His arrest was widely covered in international media. The Committee to Protect Journalists described his detention as a "a sad reflection of the overall decline of press freedom and increasing attacks on journalists under Taliban rule." In 2012, North had described a looming tipping point for the presence of foreign troops in Afghanistan, and a drastic change in the mood of the country.

North is the author of the 2024 book War & Peace & War: Twenty Years in Afghanistan, an account of Taliban resurgence over two decades, told through the lives of five Afghans.
