= Mohammad Ghaus Akhund =

Foreign minister of Afghanistan

Mohammad Ghaus محمد غوس
- Born: 1961 (age 64–65); Kingdom of Afghanistan
- Occupations: Politician, Taliban member

Mullah Mohammad Ghaus Akhund (born 1961?) was an Afghan politician and among the leadership of the Taliban which ruled Afghanistan from 1996 to 2001. During the Soviet–Afghan War, he fought as a member of Hezb-i Islami Khalis. He served as foreign minister of Afghanistan from September 1996, when the Taliban captured Kabul until June 1997, when he and some other Taliban leaders were kidnapped by opposition forces at Mazar-i-Sharif in the northern part of the country. Earlier in 1997, he led a Taliban delegation to Houston, Texas to negotiate an oil pipeline contract with the Unocal Corporation. He later escaped from captivity.
