= Afghanistan–China relations =

- Afghanistan: China

Diplomatic mission
- Afghan Embassy, Beijing: Chinese Embassy, Kabul

Envoy
- Ambassador Bilal Karimi: Ambassador Zhao Xing

Diplomatic relations between Afghanistan and China were established in the 18th century, when Afghanistan was ruled by Ahmad Shah Durrani and China by Qianlong. Trade relations between these nations date back to at least the Han dynasty with the profitable Silk Road. China has an embassy in Kabul, and Afghanistan has an embassy in Beijing. The two countries share a 92 km (57 mi) border.

During the 20th century, China extended economic aid and multi-million dollar of loans to develop Afghanistan during the early Cold War period. This friendship was briefly interrupted after the Sino-Soviet split and the Soviet invasion of Afghanistan (1979), with the Soviet Union installing pro-Soviet and anti-Chinese regimes in Afghanistan. China supported the Mujahideen and was an important arms supplier to them. However, since the withdrawal of Soviet troops and détente of Soviet and subsequent Russian-Chinese relations, China-Afghan relations have also improved significantly in the 21st century.

During the NATO war in Afghanistan, Chinese political involvement initially was somewhat limited, but trade relations still continued with China as Afghanistan's largest trading partner and China giving Afghanistan millions of dollars in aid throughout the war. China's influence and shuttle diplomatic role in Afghanistan also grew over those years, China preparing to help broker peace in the war-torn country.

After the Taliban regained control of the country in 2021, China, like all other countries except the Russian Federation as of 2026, does not formally recognize the reinstated Islamic Emirate but has transferred the embassy and accredited their ambassador. Despite its non-recognition, China negotiates issues of trade, investment, and aid with the Taliban government by referring to it as "Afghan Interim Government" (Chinese: 阿富汗临时政府).

== History ==
Various Chinese dynasties have also occupied parts of Afghanistan and Central Asia around their current border; and Afghanistan has historically been at the center of the lucrative Silk Road.

=== Han dynasty ===
The Han defeated the Dayuan in the Han-Dayuan war, thereby establishing Chinese control over parts of northern Afghanistan. Later the Han dynasty set up the Protectorate of the Western Regions to protect Silk Road trade through Central Asia. In antiquity, the region that is now Afghanistan was known for its devotion to Buddhism, which had been founded in India in the 5th century BC. Chinese records from the Han dynasty refer to Kabul as "Kao-fu", which is described as a wealthy cite located in the Hindu Kush mountains on a strategic location on the trade routes linking Central Asia to India. A Buddhist monk from what is now Afghanistan arrived in China in 2 BC and converted the first Chinese to Buddhism. Afghanistan was often visited by Chinese Buddhist pilgrims on their way to India in antiquity, and Buddhist sites such as Balkh and the Buddhas of Bamyan attracted many Chinese visitors. Chinese records credit craftsmen from Afghanistan with producing the first glass in China between 424 and 428 AD, through archaeological evidence suggests that glass was being produced earlier in China.

=== Tang dynasty ===
In 605, emissaries from what is now Afghanistan arrived in Luoyang (at the time China's capital) to pay tribute to the Emperor in exchange for greater rights to trade with China. When the Tang dynasty was established in 618 AD, the claim to see Afghanistan as part of China's sphere of influence was inherited, a claim that successive Tang emperors were willing to enforce via military means.

During the Tang dynasty parts of Afghanistan were under the control of China's Protectorate General to Pacify the West. In 659, Soghd and Ferghana, along with cities like Tashkent, Samarkand, Balkh, Herat, and Kabul, became part of the protectorate under Emperor Gaozong. Afghanistan's Herat and Uzbekistan's Bukhara and Samarkand became part of the Tang protectorate. The Indian historian K. P. S. Menon wrote about the Chinese "performed the remarkable feat of sending an army of 100,000 men which marched up the Pamirs from Kashgar" and then crossed Afghanistan to occupy the Hunza Valley in what is now Pakistan under Tang General Gao Xianzhi.

The defeat of the Western Turks and the defeat of the Sassanids by the Arabs had facilitated the Chinese expansion under Emperor Gaozong into Herat, northeastern Iran and Afghanistan (Tukharistan), Bukhara, Samarkand, Tashkent, and Soghdiana, which previously belonged to the western Turks.

During the Tang dynasty, a period of prosperity and wealth that many Chinese see as one of the highlights of their history, trade flourished along the Silk Road between Afghanistan and China. The Chinese Buddhist monk Xuanzang passed through Afghanistan on his way to India and described with awe his wonder at viewing the Buddhas of Bamyan. Religions such as Nestorian Christianity first reached China in the Tang dynasty via Afghanistan, to be followed later by Islam.

The Church of the East Christians like the Bactrian Priest Yisi of Balkh helped the Tang dynasty general Guo Ziyi militarily crush the Sogdian-Turk led An Lushan rebellion, with Yisi personally acting as a military commander and Yisi and the Church of the East were rewarded by the Tang dynasty with titles and positions as described in the Xi'an Stele.

=== Mongol Empire ===
Both regions were briefly unified under the Mongol Empire. This also contributed to the sustenance and growth of the Silk Road.

=== Silk Road ===
Trade relations between Afghanistan and China mostly involved trade of fruit and tea via caravans through Xinjiang and the Wakhan Corridor on the border between the two countries. Buddhist monks from the area of what is now Afghanistan were involved in the Silk Road transmission of Buddhism to Han dynasty China. Faxian traveled to Afghanistan in the 5th century. In the 21st century, China and Afghanistan are making efforts to revive a New Silk Road through the Belt and Road Initiative.

=== Qing dynasty ===
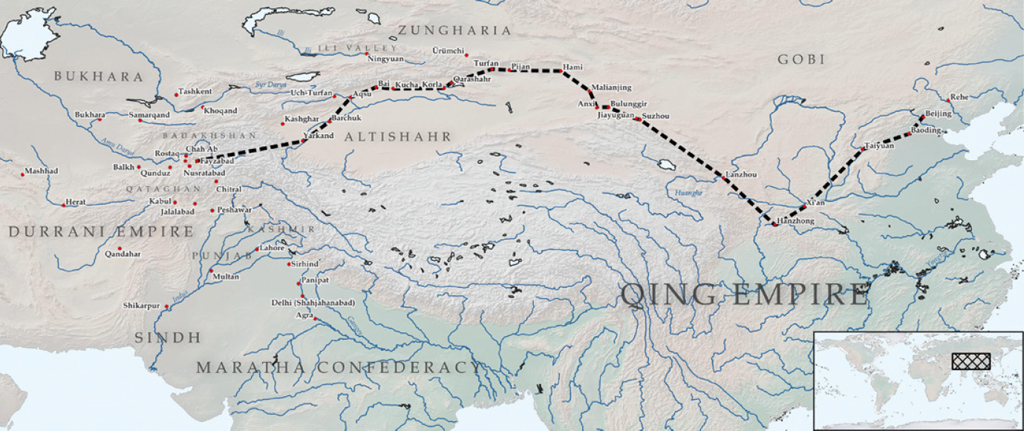
Map of the Afghan embassy to the Qing dynasty in 1763

Fazil Biy, the ruler of Kokand, and other Kyrgyz chieftains pleaded to Ahmad Shah Durrani to aid them against Qing expansionism. Ahmad Shah, delighted to use a casus belli in the name of Islam, accepted, sending men to occupy the regions between Tashkent and Kokand, though these men later withdrew by 1764 as any alliance failed to be forged.

In 1763, Ahmad Shah had dispatched an embassy to the Qing. His aims in this are unknown, however, an embassy allowed Ahmad Shah to establish himself as an emperor. The letter he sent to the Qing emperor Qianlong is missing, but from the Qing reply, the letter seems to have been dedicated to his recent conquests and victory at the third battle of Panipat, and Qing expansion.

The letter positioned Ahmad Shah's expansions as bringing order and stability to areas overrun with rebels and lawlessness (in reference to his campaigns in Iran and India). The battle of Panipat was strongly detailed in the letter, in what was likely a fath-nama, meaning a victory letter or declaration to celebrate ones victory. The Qing emperor ignored the effective threat and downplayed the Afghan victory.

In the second part of the letter, the Qianlong appeared much more defensive, in need of justifying the Qing conquest of the Dzungars and the Altishahr Khojas. He accused them of causing devastation and laying false accusations against him. A report also suggested that Ahmad Shah considered the territories the Qing claimed belonged to the Muslims. In reality, Ahmad Shah possibly wanted to establish spheres of influence, which was similarly done with the Ottomans which divided Iran between them, and a treaty with Bukhara that had established the Amu Darya as the border.

Why has your Khan dispatched you? Has your Khan not sent you to appear at an audience with the brilliance of our Great Lord? Our Great Lord is the ruler who has united All under Heaven. Besides you Afghans, as soon as people from the West, Russia, even the former Zunghars came, all of them promptly prostrated themselves before the Great Lord. He is like Heaven; do you not bow before Heaven?

— A Qing grand councillor, remarking at the Afghan envoy's refusal to Kowtow

When the Afghan embassy had arrived in Beijing, the chief envoy, Khwaja Mirhan, had refused to kowtow before the Qing emperor. The Qing officials, in shock, demanded he kowtow, to which Mirhan acquiesced. This incident damaged the Qing-Afghan relations and Qianlong cut ties with the Afghans following this. No immediate consequence occurred, and the envoy was given favor.

Mirhan's refusal possibly came out of religious reasons, but the Qing received it as Ahmad Shah declaring himself equal to Qianlong. Qianlong, however, was reconciliatory and instead shifted blame on their escort. From Qianlong's view, he saw the Afghans as a significant power and attempted to impress the envoy and in contrast, Ahmad Shah, of the Qing empire. This was especially done in motivation of Altishahr's recent conquest and concerns over stability in the region.

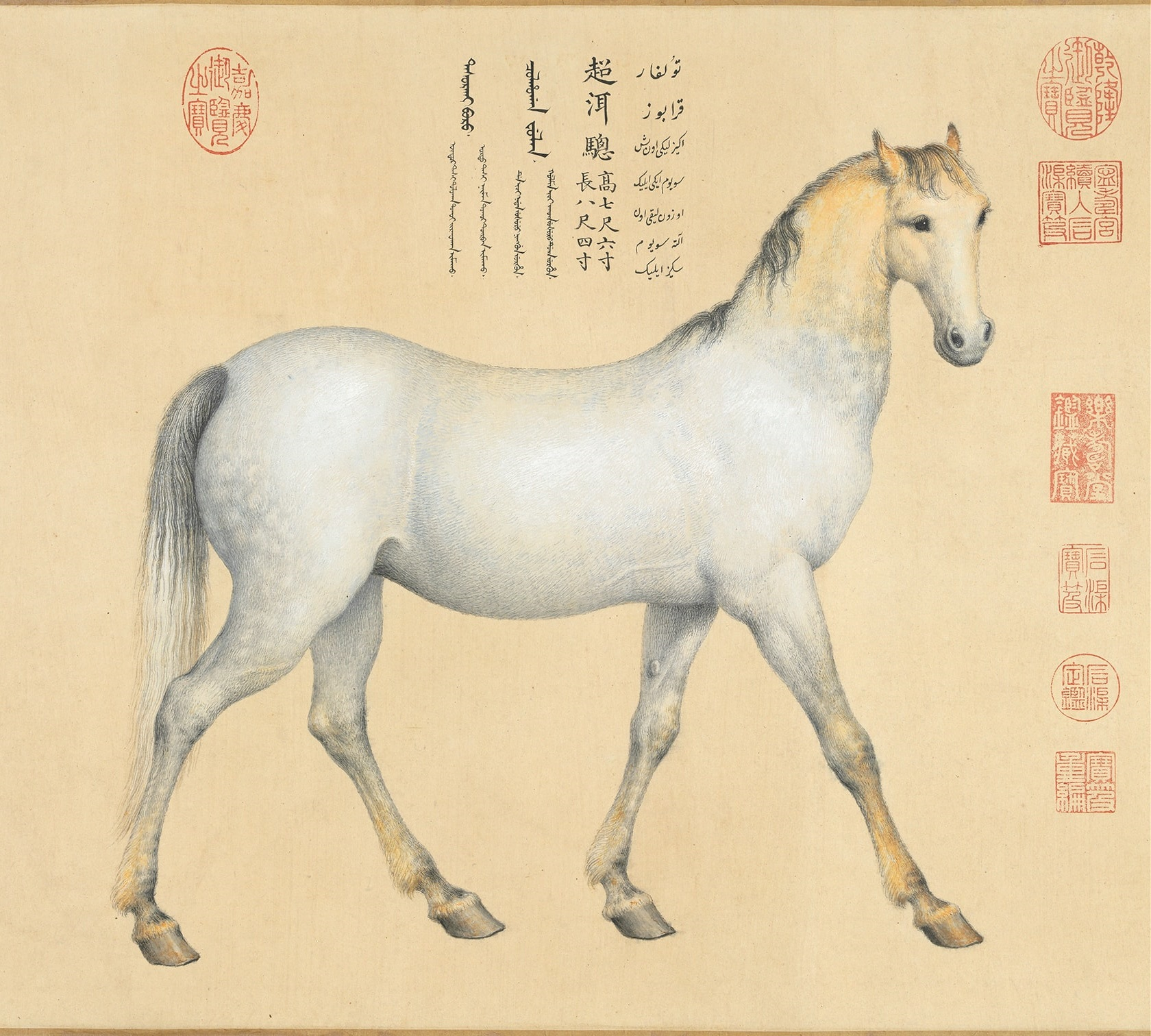
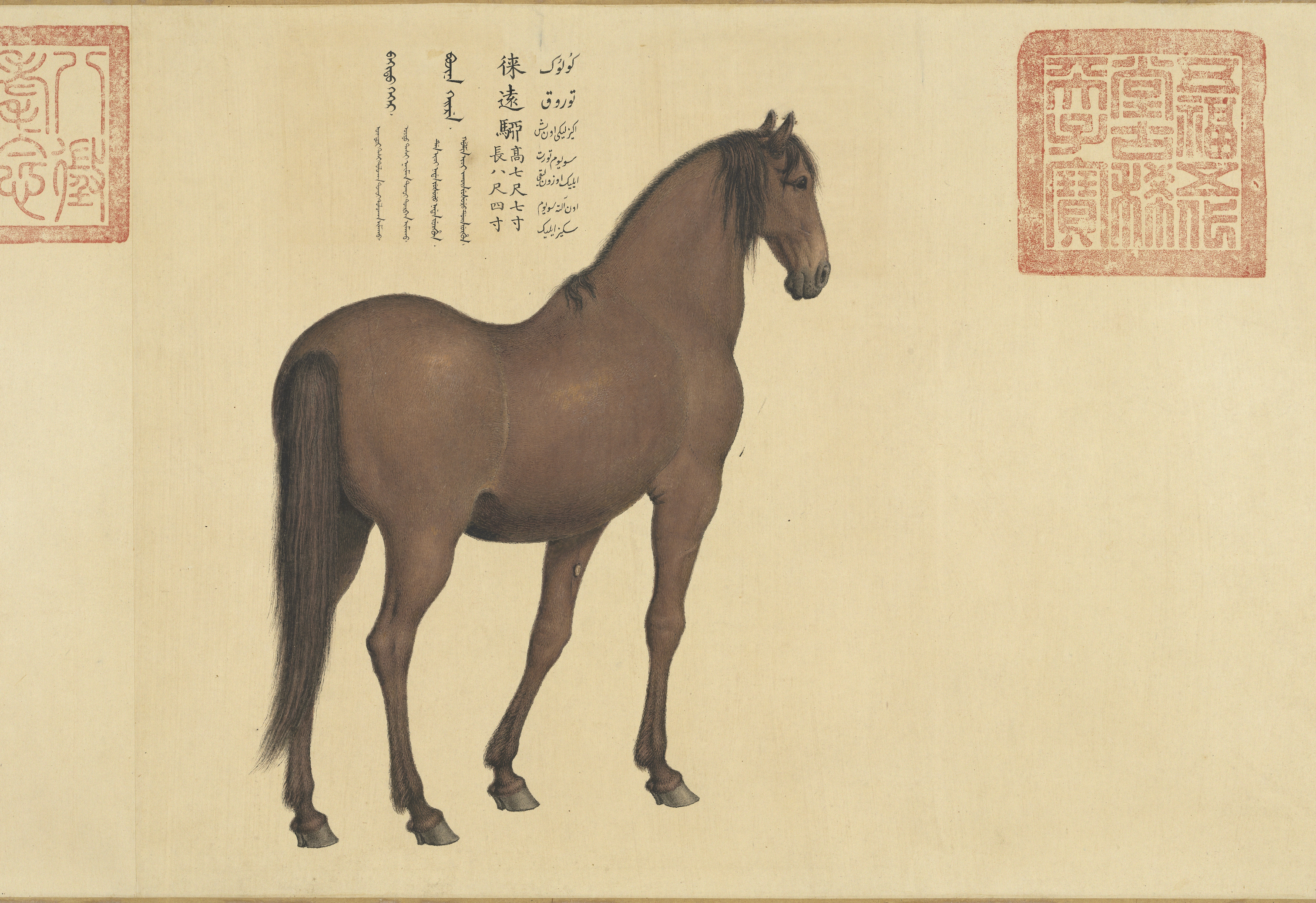
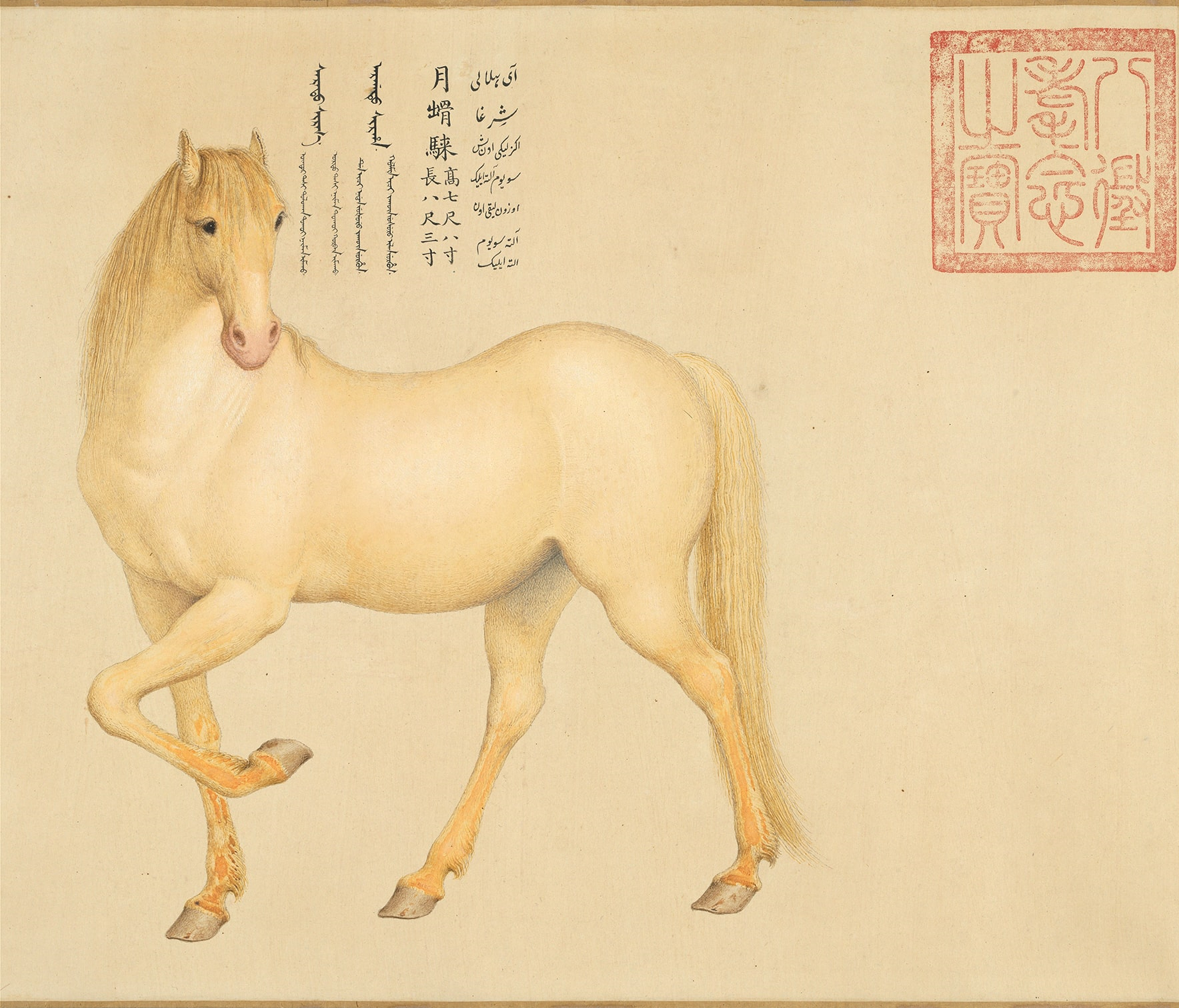
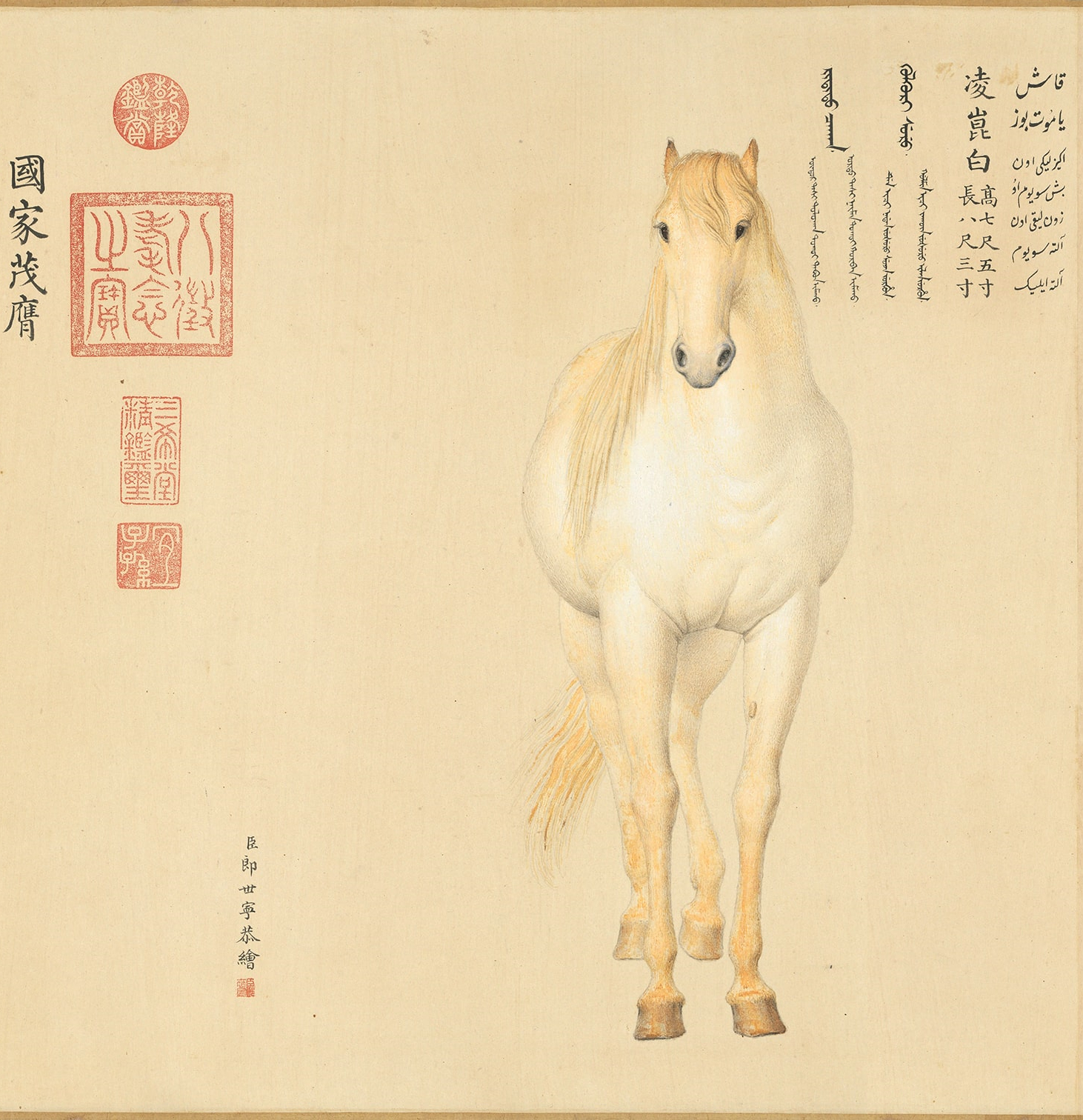
Depiction of the four Afghan horses sent by Ahmad Shah, painted by Qing court painter Giuseppe Castiglione

Ahmad Shah's gifts included four horses, which were painted by the Qing court painter, Giuseppe Castiglione. Nonetheless, by the time of the envoy's return journey to Afghanistan, Qianlong made preparations to secure Qing territories.

In 1759, as the revolt of the Altishahr Khojas crumbled, two descendants of the Afaqi Sufi lineage crossed into Badakhshan, being pursued by the Qing forces. Fude, the Qing general of the expedition, demanded that Sultan Shah, the ruler of Badakhshan, to arrest the brothers. Sultan Shah accepted, likely wishing to have Qing military aid, especially against the Durrani Empire. Distrust occurred between the Qing and Sultan Shah due to the Afaqi descendants residing in Badakhshan for months, including Sultan Shah's possible initial refusal to hand them over, possibly intending to send them to Bukhara. Qianlong threatened invasion, which did not occur as one of the descendant's remains were sent to Yarkand.

The death of the Afaqi brothers spurned relations with the Afghans, causing Sultan Shah to plead to the Qing, claiming that Ahmad Shah intended to exact revenge for their deaths. No immediate Afghan invasion occurred. The Qing however, faced numerous frustrations with their tributaries in Central Asia, including a major revolt in Uch-Turfan that required tremendous effort to defeat.

As a result, Qianlong adopted a policy of strict non-interference, realizing that Qing troops in Altishahr were significantly stretched and spread thin. The Afghans, however, seen as a threat, would show the weakness of Qing control in the region.

In August 1768, Qianlong was informed of the Afghan invasion of Badakhshan led by Shah Wali Khan in May, with Afghan forces seizing Sultan Shah's capital, Fayzabad, who fled north. A Qing agent, Yunggui, held the position that the Qing should interfere in the conflict. Qianlong, however, affirmed that military intervention would be irrational, and strictly forbade any military interference. Historians see this as surprising, as the invasion by the Afghans threatened the Qing Empire itself.

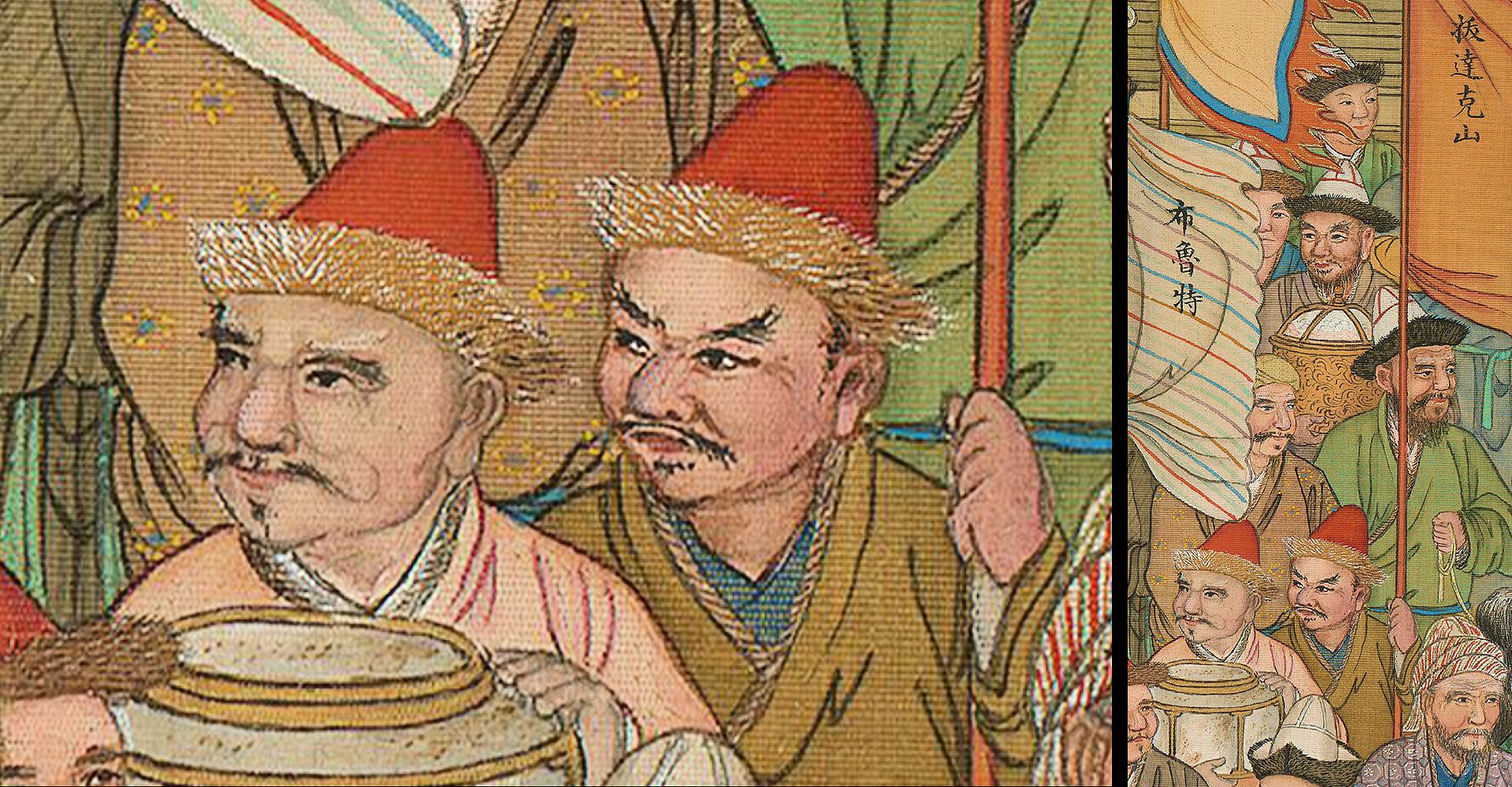
Delegates from Badakhshan in Peking, 1761

Qing sources affirm that the Afghans established Sarimsaq, a child of the Afaqi's who escaped to Badakhshan, in Kunduz. Qianlong was distraught, as another possible revolt could revolve around Sarimsaq, with reports of Muslim travelers and funds being sent to Sarimsaq. This still did not convince Qianlong to act, and he refused to send any message negatively to Ahmad Shah at all. During this, Sultan Shah defeated the Afghan governor and reoccupied his capital, but feared another Afghan invasion, sending desperate letters to the Qing in the winter of 1768 to ask for help, claiming that Ahmad Shah would invade next year.

Qianlong harshly rebutted, blaming Sultan Shah for provoking the conflict with the Afghans and affirmed that he would only fight the Afghans if they actually invaded Qing territory. Sultan Shah wrote a letter to Emin Khoja in response in August 1769, expecting aid as he was a vassal, only to find himself totally abandoned. In December 1769, Sultan Shah wrote another letter which Qianlong received that accused him of failing to uphold his duties. Qianlong rebuked him, and stated that under no circumstances would the Qing aid him.

We have long known that you have previously presented gifts to the Afghans. That you now have no more options but to evade the issue just shows that you are paying tribute to the Afghans! […] If you cannot protect your own lands, and wish to submit to the Afghans, then suit yourself! […] If you wish to rely on our armies to serve your enmities and to subjugate your neighboring tribes, then we will under no circumstances provide you with our troops.

— Qianlong's reply to Sultan Shah's plea for aid against Ahmad Shah

Qianlong had initially considered the Afghans tributaries, but after the former incident, he no longer even sought the prospect of any form of Durrani submission. His reply to Sultan Shah effectively saw the Qing recognize the Afghans as a rival power to them, with Qianlong recognizing that the Afghans were unable to be treated like tributaries. Rather than aiding the ruler of Badakhshan as his initial policy had implicated him to, Qianlong instead justified the Afghan invasion, prompted to by overextended armies, the distance, and stability. Instead, gambling on the difficult terrain between the Afghan and Qing realms for safety.

Within the year, Ahmad Shah occupied Badakhshan and Sultan Shah was executed.

== 20th century ==
Sino-Afghan relations remained ambiguous in the early part of the 20th century, with mainly opium and horses being traded between the border.

=== World War II ===
Chinese Muslims fought against Japan in World War II. In order to gain war support for China from Muslim countries, Hui Muslim Ma Fuliang (馬賦良) and Uyghur Muslim Isa Yusuf Alptekin visited Egypt, Syria, and Turkey in 1939. The Indian leaders Tagore and Gandhi and Pakistani leader Jinnah both discussed the war with the Chinese Muslim delegation led by Ma Fuliang. In Turkey İsmet İnönü met with the Chinese Muslim delegation. Newspapers in China reported the visit. Ma Fuliang and Isa were working for Zhu Jiahua.

The bombardment of Chinese Muslims by the warplanes of the Japanese was reported in the newspapers of Syria. Afghanistan, Iran, Iraq, Syria, and Lebanon were all toured by the Chinese delegation. The Foreign Minister, Prime Minister, and President of Turkey met with the Chinese Muslim delegation after they came via Egypt in May 1939. Gandhi and Jinnah met with the Hui Ma Fuliang and Uyghur Isa Alptekin as they denounced Japan.

=== Early Cold War and foundation of PRC ===
The Kingdom of Afghanistan recognized the People's Republic of China in January 1950, although diplomatic relations did not begin until January 20, 1955. Abdul Samad was the first Afghan Ambassador posted to Peking in 1955. Afghanistan was also one of the first countries to recognize the PRC.

Premier Zhou Enlai and Vice Premier He Long visited Afghanistan in January 1957. This was the first ever visit taken by Chinese leadership to Afghanistan in the history of Sino-Afghan relations. During the visit, the Chinese Premier and Vice Premier met with King Mohammad Zahir Shah of Afghanistan, and held respective talks with Prime Minister Mohammad Daud Khan, Vice Prime Minister Ali Mohammed and Vice Prime Minister and Foreign Minister Mr. Mohammad Naim. The Chinese Premier's visit to Afghanistan enhanced mutual understanding between the two countries and laid a solid foundation for the development of friendly relations between China and Afghanistan. In October 1957, Prime Minister Mohammad Daud of Afghanistan visited China under China's invitation. During the visit, he held meetings with Chairman of the CCP Mao Zedong, Vice Chairman of the CCP Zhu De and Chairman Liu Shaoqi of the Standing Committee of the National People's Congress.

China's lack of support for Afghan claims in Pakistan's Pashtunistan was disapproved by Kabul, and the Sino-Soviet split (with Afghanistan being close to the Soviet Union) was also a negative; however relations remained generally positive. Trade pacts as well as a treaty of friendship and non-aggression were signed between the two nations in 1960.

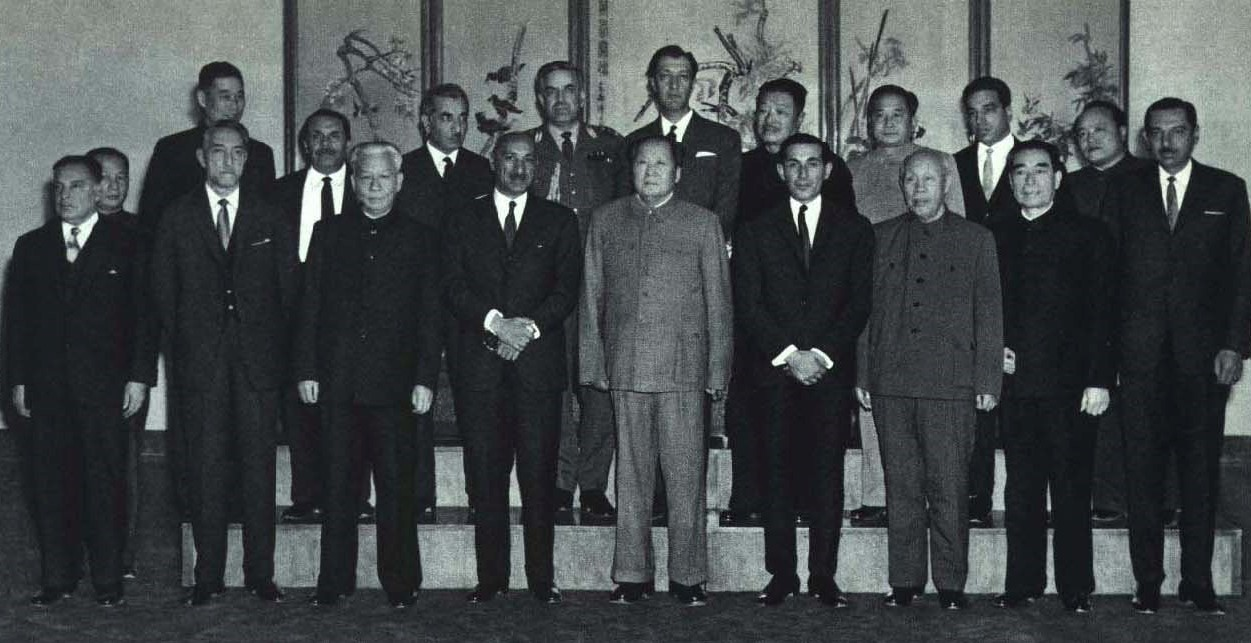
King Mohammed Zahir Shah and the visiting Afghan delegation with Chairman Mao Zedong, President Liu Shaoqi, Premier Zhou Enlai and the Chinese leadership in Beijing on November 1, 1964.

On 22 November 1963 Beijing and Kabul signed the Boundary Treaty. This treaty settled the territorial dispute over the Afghan-controlled Wakhan on the border between Badakhshan Province in Afghanistan and the Xinjiang Uyghur Autonomous Region in China. The China-Afghanistan border is 92.45 kilometers long.

=== Soviet invasion of Afghanistan (1979) ===
Following the Saur Revolution in Afghanistan, China reacted negatively to the Democratic Republic of Afghanistan as it viewed it as a Soviet advance and a threat to its friendly relations with Iran and Pakistan. Beijing recognized the new government two weeks after the revolution.

On 27 December 1979, Soviet troops were deployed in Afghanistan. On December 30, Chinese government made announcement condemning the Soviet military invasion, and refused to recognize the Soviet-backed Karmal government. The official relationship was stopped, and the Chinese embassy was degraded to representative office, and only dealt with consular and visa issues.

During the Sino-Soviet split, strained relations between China and the USSR resulted in bloody border clashes and mutual backing for the opponent's enemies. China and Afghanistan had neutral relations with each other during the King's rule. When the pro-Soviet Afghan Communists seized power in Afghanistan in 1978, relations between China and the Afghan communists quickly turned hostile. The Afghan pro-Soviet communists supported China's then-enemy Vietnam and blamed China for supporting Afghan anticommunist militants. China responded to the Soviet war in Afghanistan by supporting the Afghan mujahideen and ramping up their military presence near Afghanistan in Xinjiang. China acquired military equipment from America to defend itself from Soviet attack. By the early 1980s, China viewed Afghanistan as posing a moderately high risk because of its ties with the Soviet Union. China supplied weapons to the Afghan Mujahideen fighting the Soviet Union. The weapons were transferred mostly through Pakistan and became part of the US-led Operation Cyclone.

Soviet withdrawal from Afghanistan was one of the conditions pushed by China for any détente in China-Soviet relations. China saw the Soviet presence as a regional threat to itself (to prevent the USSR from encircling China) and a threat to its ally Pakistan. With possible United States support, China supplied weapons to Afghan guerrillas against the Soviet puppet government.

=== Post Soviet collapse (1991) ===
China distanced itself from Afghanistan following the rise of the Taliban in the 1990s. China severed its diplomatic relationship with the Taliban and did not recognize the Taliban government. Concerned by the Taliban's connections to East Turkistan terrorist organizations, Chinese security concerns increased. China also feared that chaos in Afghanistan could spill across the countries' border.

Motivated by its concerns about violence in Xinjiang, China sent a delegation to meet with the Taliban in early 1999. In November 2000, China's then ambassador to Pakistan, Lu Shulin, became the first senior representative of a non-Muslim country to meet with Mullah Omar.

== 21st century ==
For the past two decades, China has kept a low profile in Afghanistan, focusing more on resource and material mining than on peace brokering. However, since 2014 China has assumed an increased responsibility in maintaining regional stability. It has maintained open communications with Afghan governments on a non-ideological basis and avoided military involvement in the country.

=== Islamic Republic of Afghanistan ===
After the fall of the Taliban regime after the United States intervention in 2001, relations between China and Afghanistan had greatly improved and were reestablished. In December 2001, China sent to Afghanistan a working team of the Ministry of Foreign Affairs, which attended the Afghan Interim Administration's foundation ceremony and sent a message of congratulations to President Hamid Karzai.

The establishment of Afghanistan's new government drew the two countries closer. In January 2002, President Karzai visited China, and met respectively with General Secretary of the CCP Jiang Zemin and Premier of China Zhu Rongji. The two sides exchanged the notes of China providing 30 million yuan of emergent material aid and US$1 million in cash to Afghanistan. CCP General Secretary Jiang Zemin announced that China would provide US$150 million-worth of assistance to Afghanistan for its reconstruction. The 30 million yuan of emergent material aid had been delivered to Kabul by the end of March 2002. The Chinese Embassy in Afghanistan was reopened on February 6.

In May 2002, Chinese Foreign Minister Tang Jiaxuan visited Afghanistan. During the visit, the Chinese Foreign Minister met with Hamid Karzai, Chairman of the Interim Administration of Afghanistan and ex-King Zahir Shah, and held talks with his counterpart Abdullah Abdullah. The two sides signed the Agreement on Economic and Technical Cooperation of US$30 million Chinese aid to Afghanistan. In November, Afghan Foreign Minister Abdullah visited China. During his visit, the Chinese and Afghan sides exchanged the notes of China providing US$1 million of material aid to Afghanistan. In December, China, together with the other 5 neighboring countries of Afghanistan signed Kabul Declaration on Good Neighborly Relations, reaffirming its commitment to respect the sovereignty and territorial integrity of Afghanistan and to continuously support Afghanistan's peace process and reconstruction.

In February 2003, President Karzai passed through China twice. In May, the Vice President of Afghan Islamic Transitional Government Nematullah Sharhrani paid a working visit to China. During the visit he held talks with Vice President of China Zeng Qinghong and met with NPC Chairman Wu Bangguo and Premier Wen Jiabao. The two sides signed three cooperative documents including the Agreement of Economic and Technical Cooperation, under which the Chinese Government provides US$15 million grant to the Afghan Government.

After 2012, Afghanistan began to occupy a more prominent place in China's foreign relations towards its neighboring countries, particularly under China's new neighborhood policy established during the early years of the General secretaryship of Xi Jinping. Presidents Hamid Karzai and Ashraf Ghani visited China in 2013 and October 2014 respectively.

==== Chinese peacekeeping efforts ====
China expanded its peacemaking role in the Afghan war.

Since 2017, foreign minister Wang Yi initiated shuttle diplomacy between Pakistan and Afghanistan, who over the course of the war have accused each other of attacks and bombings. The three countries—China, Afghanistan, and Pakistan—have agreed to establish a trilateral dialogue forum and revive the Shanghai Cooperation Organisation's Contact Group on Afghanistan.

Some claim the China–Pakistan Economic Corridor would be the most effective way to integrate Afghanistan into the regional Belt and Road Initiative.

To counter regional instability, China has since 2015 joined the Quadrilateral Coordination Group and the Moscow Format. In 2015, China hosted negotiations between the Taliban and Afghan officials in Xinjiang's capital Urumqi. In 2014 to 2018, China developed good ties with the Taliban by meeting them several times. The US has also stepped up negotiation efforts with the Taliban.

=== Islamic Emirate of Afghanistan ===
In 2021, following the withdrawal of United States troops from Afghanistan and the ensuing Taliban offensive, the Chinese government signaled its willingness to work with a new Taliban-led government. The Chinese government is concerned about the possibility of Taliban support for militants in Xinjiang.

In June 2022, a magnitude 5.9 earthquake killed over 1,150 people and caused widespread destruction in southeastern Afghanistan. China participated in the humanitarian efforts by providing US$7.5 million worth of humanitarian assistance for the affected. At least seven Chinese planes arrived to distribute aid. The Chinese Ambassador to Afghanistan also provided 18 tons of supplies and US$200,000 to the Afghan Red Crescent Society. In a press conference, the Taliban thanked Chinese officials for the assistance.

In September 2023, China appointed Zhao Xing as its Ambassador in Afghanistan, becoming the first country to appoint a new ambassador after the 2021 Taliban victory. Zhao was received by acting prime minister Hasan Akhund and acting foreign minister Amir Khan Muttaqi at the Presidential Palace. In December 2023, Bilal Karimi was accepted as Afghanistan's Ambassador to China. Karimi presented his credentials to Chinese President Xi Jinping in January 2024, making China the first country to accept credentials from Taliban diplomats. As of January 2024, China has not stated whether it recognizes the Taliban government. Despite its non-recognition of the Taliban government, China negotiates with the Taliban on issues of trade, investment, and aid. Among the reasons China seeks to maintain influence with the Taliban is to prevent Uyghur separatists from using Afghanistan as a base from which to conduct separatist activity in Xinjiang.

In November 2024 a likely drug-related attack happened near the Afghan border in Tajikistan, killing a Chinese worker.

On January 6, 2026, three locals and a company employee are killed and five others were wounded in clashes between residents and employees of a Chinese company contracted for ore washing by the Afghan Ministry of Mining at a gold extraction site in Chah Ab District, Takhar Province, Afghanistan. The company's operations are later suspended pending a probe into the incident.

ISIS-K claimed responsibility for a bombing attack on a Chinese restaurant on January 26, 2026, in Kabul, that killed at least seven people, with the reason stated as China's treatment of the Islamic Uyghurs and warned of further attacks. Afghan officials said the explosion is still under investigation. Police confirmed that one Chinese citizen and six Afghans were killed in the incident.

To reduce trade dependency on Pakistan, the Taliban opened a 121 km (75 mi) transit road through the Wakhan Corridor on October 4, 2026. However, China kept the Wakhjir Pass border closed due to security concerns in Xinjiang.

== Military cooperation ==
The Chinese People's Liberation Army trained and supported the Afghan mujahideen during the Soviet-Afghan war. The training camps were moved from Pakistan into China itself. Anti-aircraft missiles, rocket launchers and machine guns, valued at hundreds of millions, were given to the mujahideen by the Chinese. Chinese military advisors and army troops were present with the Mujahidin during training.

In September 2018, Afghanistan's Ambassador to China, Janan Mosazai, announced that China will train Afghan soldiers in China, joining plane crews already training in China.

=== Wakhan base ===
China has reportedly built a base for the Afghan Armed Forces near Gaz Khan village in Wakhan District of Badakhshan Province of Afghanistan, with the goal of strengthening counter-terrorism cooperation. Per General Dawlat Waziri of the Ministry of Defense, China will cover all of the base's material and technical expenses.

China wants to ensure stability of the region to counter the East Turkistan Islamic Movement (ETIM). The ETIM has bases in Afghanistan, and China wants to prevent them from 'radicalizing' Uyghurs in Xinjiang and prevent them from carrying jihadist and terrorist attacks on the mainland.

According to Ferghana news:

The Afghan delegation led by Defence Minister Tariq Shah Bahrami visited China during which the parties agreed to build the base. Tariq Shah with his Chinese colleague General Chang Wanquan and other military officials discussed security issues and agreed to cooperate on fighting terrorism in the Afghan province of Badakhshan and the entire northern region.

According to General Amarhel of Afghanistan, many Chinese Uyghurs were seen receiving training from the Taliban and Al-Qaeda.

In June 2014, at China's request, Pakistan launched a successful military counterattack against the Taliban in North Waziristan. The Taliban movement in North Pakistan allegedly hosted the ETIM.

As of December 2017, China has promised to provide $85 million for Afghan army to create a 'mountain brigade' to defend the Afghan-Chinese border, a move welcomed by the Afghanistan military.

According to Rupert Stone of TRT World,

Beijing has also been concerned about what they call the threat posed by Uighur and other terrorists using Afghanistan as a base for attacks against the Chinese mainland. In response, China has intensified security on its border, reportedly engaging in joint patrols with Afghan forces and building a base in Badakhshan province, while also launching the Quadrilateral Coordination and Cooperation Mechanism (QCCM) with Afghanistan, Pakistan and Tajikistan.

== Economic cooperation ==
Countries which signed cooperation documents related to the Belt and Road Initiative

China is Afghanistan's largest foreign investor.

Since 2007 it has provided Afghanistan telecom equipment. China also purchased rare mineral rights, an investment the US supported.

Since 2010, China has increased its economic aid and investment in Afghanistan, notably with announcement by Metallurgical Corporation of China (MCC) pledging $3.5 billion to develop Aynak Copper mines. China has since been mining copper outside of Kabul.

Between 2012 and 2013 China lent $240 million in aid and pledged a similar amount over the next four years.

In 2016 the two countries signed a memorandum of understanding, with Beijing pledging at least $100 million to Kabul. In September 2016, the first direct train crossed from China to Hairatan. There are also plans of air corridors between Ürümqi and Kabul.

Since 2017 it has built fiber optic cables for Afghanistan.

As of June 2018, China started extracting oil in the Amu Darya basin. In January 2023, Chinese oil extractor Xinjiang Central Asia Petroleum and Gas Co (CAPEIC) signed its first major contract with the Taliban-led government worth US$150 million in the first year and a total of US$540 million by 2026 to further expand oil extraction from the Amu Darya basin and develop an oil reserve in the country's northern Sar-e Pol Province. The projects would create about 3000 jobs in the region. A Chinese mining company is also in talks to extend a resource contract over the continued operation of a copper mine in eastern Logar province. In 2023, CAPEIC invested US$49 million in the project, or around one-third of the original target.

Effective 1 December 2024, China eliminated tariffs for goods imported from all of the countries that the United Nations categorizes as least developed and with which China has diplomatic relations, including Afghanistan.

=== Belt and Road Initiative ===
Afghanistan joined the Belt and Road Initiative (BRI) in 2023.

The success of China's BRI depends on the stability and success of China's neighbor Afghanistan. Given that Afghanistan may be further involved in the BRI, it could provide the shortest route between China and the Middle East, Persian gulf and Arabian sea; as well as helping develop and repair Afghanistan's infrastructure. Regional instability could threaten not just BRI but also the China–Pakistan Economic Corridor (CPEC).

One major initiative is the 'Five-nations railway' linking China, Iran, Kyrgyzstan, Afghanistan, and Tajikistan, with routes also connecting Afghanistan to Pakistan.

The CPEC would be the most efficient way to integrate Afghanistan into the BRI, providing Afghanistan the most direct access to the sea via Pakistan. Despite enmity between Pakistan and India, with mutual Chinese cooperation, India has agreed to cooperate with Pakistan on the effort. China and India have cooperated on training Afghanistan diplomats in New Delhi as security is a common ground for the two countries. Both see al-Qaeda, ISIS-Khorasan, ETIM, Lashkar-e-Taiba, the Haqqani Network, and the Islamic Movement of Uzbekistan (IMU) as threats to regional peace and prosperity.

China has also cooperated with the US on increasing stability.

According to Zhao Hong, Afghanistan also helps China implement its 'March West' strategy to 'expand economic and strategic influence in Central Asia, the Middle East, and beyond.'

As of 2023, Afghanistan's security situation has prevented it from becoming a major part of the BRI. Afghanistan attended the 3rd Belt and Road Forum held in Beijing between 17 and 18 October 2023, represented by acting minister of commerce and industry Nooruddin Azizi.

In May 2025, during a trilateral summit between Afghanistan, China, and Pakistan, Chinese Foreign Minister Wang Yi announced the extension of the China-Pakistan Economic Corridor, one of China's most ambitious BRI projects, into Afghanistan.

== Sources ==
- Cardenal, Juan Pablo; Araújo, Heriberto (2011). La silenciosa conquista china (in Spanish). Barcelona: Crítica. pp. 81, 123. ISBN 9788498922578.
- Shen-Yu, Dai (1966). "China and Afghanistan". The China Quarterly. 25 (1): 213–221. doi:10.1017/S0305741000027867. ISSN 1468-2648. S2CID 154014250.
