= International relations with the Taliban =

The Taliban is an Afghan Islamist political and militant movement which has ruled Afghanistan under a theocratic emirate several times in the last 30 years. In August 2021, the Taliban took control of the country, and subsequently established a new government that as of 2025 only the Russian Federation recognizes.

== Historic relations ==
The Taliban were supported by several militant outfits which include the Haqqani network, Al-Qaeda and the Islamic Movement of Uzbekistan. Several countries like China, Iran, Pakistan, Qatar, Russia allegedly supported the Taliban during the War in Afghanistan (2001–2021). However, all of their governments deny providing any support to the Taliban. Likewise, the Taliban also deny receiving any foreign support from any country. It is designated by some countries as a terrorist organization.

During its first time in power (1996–2001), at its height ruling 90% of Afghanistan, the Taliban regime, also known as the "Islamic Emirate of Afghanistan". The most other nations and organizations, including the United Nations, recognised the Islamic State of Afghanistan (1992–2002), represented by the Northern Alliance, as the legitimate government of Afghanistan. At its peak, formal diplomatic recognition of the Taliban's government was acknowledged by three nations: Pakistan, Saudi Arabia, and the United Arab Emirates. Turkmenistan was the only Central Asian country at the time that maintained contact with the Taliban. The Taliban once supported the Chechen Republic of Ichkeria. In the past, Pakistan also alleged to have provided support to the Taliban. Regarding its relations with the rest of the world, the Islamic Emirate of Afghanistan held a policy of isolationism: "The Taliban believe in non-interference in the affairs of other countries and similarly desire no outside interference in their country's internal affairs".

Traditionally, the Taliban were supported by Pakistan and Saudi Arabia, while Iran, Russia, Turkey, India, Uzbekistan, Kazakhstan, Kyrgyzstan, and Tajikistan formed an anti-Taliban alliance and supported the Northern Alliance. After the fall of the Taliban régime at the end of 2001, the composition of the Taliban supporters changed. According to a study by scholar Antonio Giustozzi, in the years 2005 to 2015 most of the financial support came from the states Pakistan, Saudi Arabia, Iran, China, and Qatar, as well as from private donors from Saudi Arabia, from al-Qaeda and, for a short period of time, from the Islamic State. About 54 percent of the funding came from foreign governments, 10 percent from private donors from abroad, and 16 percent from al-Qaeda and the Islamic State. In 2014, the amount of external support was close to $900 million.

== Countries ==
Since the Taliban took over the Afghan government, countries including China, Russia, and the United States have contacted Taliban representatives, but have expressed doubts about its commitment to counterterrorism. Border clashes between the Taliban forces with Pakistan, Iran and Turkmenistan have also caused friction with Afghanistan's neighbours. Taliban-led administration has set up a consortium of companies, including some in Russia, Iran and Pakistan, to create an investment plan focusing on power, mining and infrastructure in February 2023.

=== China ===
China has been believed to have unofficial relations with the Taliban according to Malek Setiz, international relations adviser to the former Foreign Ministry of Afghanistan. The Chinese foreign ministry has not denied these interactions. Despite Beijing's repeated calls for the Taliban to maintain its commitment to the international community, China has maintained official engagement with the Afghan interim government after the Taliban regained power.

Afghan Ambassador to China Bilal Karimi presented his credentials to General Secretary of the Chinese Communist Party Xi Jinping in January 2024, making China the first country to accept credentials from Taliban diplomats.

=== India ===
India unofficially recognizes the Taliban régime in Afghanistan. India also maintained close strategic and military ties with the Northern Alliance so as to contain the rise of the Taliban during the 1990s. India was one of the closest allies of the former Afghan president Mohammad Najibullah and it strongly condemned his public execution by the Taliban. Pakistan and Kashmir-based militant groups which are thought to have ties with the Taliban have historically been involved in the Kashmir insurgency and they have frequently attacked Indian security forces.

In December 1999, Indian Airlines Flight 814 was hijacked and flown to Kandahar while it was en route from Kathmandu to Delhi. The Taliban moved its militias near the hijacked aircraft, supposedly to prevent Indian special forces from storming the aircraft, and they stalled the negotiations between India and the hijackers for several days. The New York Times later reported that there were credible links between the hijackers and the Taliban. As a part of the deal to free the plane, India released three militants. The Taliban granted the hijackers and the released militants safe passage.

Following the hijacking, India drastically increased its efforts to help Massoud, providing an arms depot in Dushanbe, Tajikistan. India also provided a wide range of high-altitude warfare equipment, helicopter technicians, medical services, and tactical advice. According to one report, Indian military support to anti-Taliban forces totalled US$70 million, including five Mil Mi-17 helicopters, and US$8 million worth of high-altitude equipment in 2001. India extensively supported the new administration in Afghanistan, leading several reconstruction projects and by 2001 had emerged as the country's largest regional donor.

In the wake of terrorist attacks in India, the Indian government has claimed that fundamentalist organisations such as the Taliban are seeking to expand their activities in India. During the 2011 ICC Cricket World Cup which was co-hosted in India, Pakistani Interior Minister Rehman Malik and Interpol chief Ronald Noble revealed that a terrorist bid to disrupt the tournament had been foiled; following a conference with Noble, Malik said that the Taliban had begun to base their activities in India with reports from neighbouring countries exposing their activities in the country and stating that a Sri Lankan terrorist who was planning to target cricketers was arrested in Colombo. In 2009, the Times of India called for India to reassess the Taliban threat.

In 2012, the Taliban said that they want to have cordial relations with India, and they praised India for resisting US calls for more military involvement in Afghanistan. After the fall of the Indian-backed Islamic Republic of Afghanistan, India did not recognize the Taliban since their rise to power in August 2021. The Indian government approached Taliban representatives in Doha in September 2021.

The country’s stance has been cautious, primarily focusing on addressing the humanitarian needs of the Afghan people. Recently, the Taliban authorities sought India’s aid for Afghanistan’s economic revival. India has maintained a "technical team" presence in Kabul and started allowing Taliban diplomatic staff in New Delhi in November 2023.

=== Iran ===
Iran has historically been an enemy of the Taliban. However, after relations between the two sides soured with the United States, Iranian officials called the Taliban one of its allies' "Axis of Resistance".

In early August 1998, after attacking the city of Mazar-i-Sharif, Taliban-allied forces massacred thousands of people in retaliation against the anti-Taliban warlords, and killed 11 Iranian diplomats in the Iranian consulate. Alleged radio intercepts indicate Mullah Omar personally approved the killings. In the following crisis between Iran and the Taliban, the Iranian government amassed up to 70,000 regular troops on the Afghan-Iranian border. War was eventually averted.

Many US senior military officials such as Robert Gates, Stanley McChrystal, David Petraeus and others believe that Iran's Islamic Revolutionary Guard Corps was involved in helping the Taliban to a certain extent during the first decade of the twenty-first century. Reports in which NATO states accused Iran of supplying and training some Taliban insurgents started coming forward since 2004/2005. While not confirmed, the U.S. maintains that Iran supported the Taliban during the War in Afghanistan, and also assessed that Iran paid bounties to the Taliban splinter group known as the Haqqani network.

We did interdict a shipment, without question the Revolutionary Guard's core Quds Force, through a known Taliban facilitator. Three of the individuals were killed... 48 122 millimetre rockets were intercepted with their various components... Iranians certainly view as making life more difficult for us if Afghanistan is unstable. We don't have that kind of relationship with the Iranians. That's why I am particularly troubled by the interception of weapons coming from Iran. But we know that it's more than weapons; it's money; it's also according to some reports, training at Iranian camps as well.

— General David Petraeus, Commander of US-NATO forces in Afghanistan, 16 March 2011

Several sources attest to an improving relationship between the Taliban and Iran during the 2010s. This included leadership changes within the Taliban itself: The Taliban's second emir, Mullah Akhtar Mansoor, particularly sought to expand ties with Iran, until he was killed by a U.S. drone strike on a return trip from Iran to Pakistan. Pro-Iran media outlets have also reported that the Taliban has included Shia Hazara fighters into its ranks. The Taliban have condemned Islamic State-linked attacks on the Hazara Shia minority. In August 2019, The Washington Post reported that Iran's "relationship with the Taliban now spans the economic, security and political realms and is likely to grow as the Taliban asserts itself again."

In August 2020, US intelligence officials assessed that Iran had offered bounties to the Taliban-linked Haqqani network to kill foreign servicemembers, including Americans, in Afghanistan in 2019. US intelligence determined that Iran paid bounties to Taliban insurgents for the 2019 attack on Bagram airport. According to CNN, Donald Trump's administration has "never mentioned Iran's connection to the bombing, an omission current and former officials said was connected to the broader prioritization of the peace agreement and withdrawal from Afghanistan."

In January 2020, the Taliban condemned the US killing of Iranian Quds Force commander Qasem Soleimani and hailed Soleimani as a "great warrior". During the 2021 Taliban offensive, Iran had to close its consulates, but its embassy in Kabul remains open after the Taliban's takeover. Pro-Taliban stance among Iranian Principlists sparks rift with other Iranians. Iran's President Ebrahim Raisi said "revive life, security and lasting peace" in Afghanistan after the US ‘defeat’. But Iran's Foreign Ministry spokesman Saeed Khatibzadeh strongly condemned the Taliban assault on the Panjshir Valley. Despite this, the two theocratic governments have strengthened bilateral strategic cooperation to combat terrorist organizations such as IS–KP, and respond to western sanctions.

=== Pakistan ===
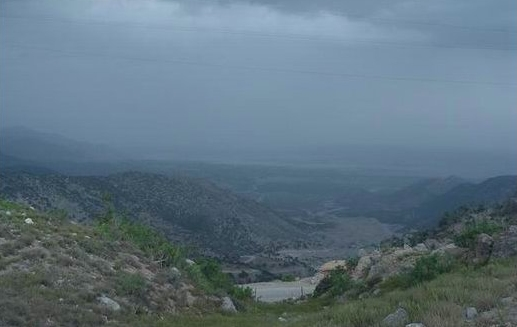
Afghanistan-Pakistan border region pictured in Paktia Province

Maulana Fazal-ur-Rehman, leader of the Pakistani Islamic (Deobandi) political party Jamiat Ulema-e Islam (F) (JUI), was an ally of Benazir Bhutto, Pakistani prime minister in 1993–1996, and then had access to the Pakistani government, army and the ISI, whom he influenced to help the Taliban. The Pakistani Inter-Services Intelligence (ISI) has since 1994 heavily supported the Taliban, while the group conquered most of Afghanistan in 1994–98.

Human Rights Watch writes, "Pakistani aircraft assisted with troop rotations of Taliban forces during combat operations in late 2000 and ... senior members of Pakistan's intelligence agency and army were involved in planning military operations." Pakistan provided military equipment, recruiting assistance, training, and tactical advice. Officially Pakistan denied supporting the Taliban militarily.

Author Ahmed Rashid claims that the Taliban had "unprecedented access" among Pakistan's lobbies and interest groups. He also writes that they at times were able to "play off one lobby against another and extend their influence in Pakistan even further". By 1998–99, Taliban-style groups in Pakistan's Pashtun belt, and to an extent in Pakistan-administered Kashmir, "were banning TV and videos ... and forcing people, particularly women, to adapt to the Taliban dress code and way of life."

After the attacks of 11 September 2001, and the US operation in Afghanistan the Afghan Taliban leadership is claimed to have fled to Pakistan where they regrouped and created several shuras to coordinate their insurgency in Afghanistan.

Afghan officials implied the Pakistani ISI's involvement in a July 2008 Taliban attack on the Indian embassy. Numerous US officials have accused the ISI of supporting terrorist groups including the Afghan Taliban. US Defense Secretary Robert Gates and others suggest the ISI maintains links with groups like the Afghan Taliban as a "strategic hedge" to help Islamabad gain influence in Kabul once US troops exit the region. US Chairman of the Joint Chiefs of Staff Admiral Mike Mullen in 2011 called the Haqqani network (the Afghan Taliban's most destructive element) a "veritable arm of Pakistan's ISI".

From 2010, a report by a leading British institution also claimed that Pakistan's intelligence service still today has a strong link with the Taliban in Afghanistan. Published by the London School of Economics, the report said that Pakistan's Inter-Services Intelligence agency (ISI) has an "official policy" of support for the Taliban. It said the ISI provides funding and training for the Taliban, and that the agency has representatives on the so-called Quetta Shura, the Taliban's leadership council. It is alleged that the Quetta Shura is exiled in Quetta. The report, based on interviews with Taliban commanders in Afghanistan, was written by Matt Waldman, a fellow at Harvard University.

"Pakistan appears to be playing a double-game of astonishing magnitude," the report said. The report also linked high-level members of the Pakistani government with the Taliban. It said Asif Ali Zardari, the Pakistani president, met with senior Taliban prisoners in 2010 and promised to release them. Zardari reportedly told the detainees they were only arrested because of American pressure. "The Pakistan government's apparent duplicity – and awareness of it among the American public and political establishment – could have enormous geopolitical implications," Waldman said. "Without a change in Pakistani behaviour it will be difficult if not impossible for international forces and the Afghan government to make progress against the insurgency." Afghan officials have long been suspicious of the ISI's role. Amrullah Saleh, the former director of Afghanistan's intelligence service, told Reuters that the ISI was "part of a landscape of destruction in this country".

Pakistan, at least up to 2011, has always strongly denied all links with Taliban.

On 15 June 2014 Pakistan army launches operation 'Zarb-e-Azb' in North Waziristan to remove and root-out Taliban from Pakistan. In this operation 327 hardcore terrorists had been killed while 45 hideouts and 2 bomb making factories of terrorists were destroyed in North Waziristan Agency as the operation continues.

Pakistan operates an organized system of support. The Taliban receive logistics there, their finances are there and recruitment is there. [..] There is a deep relationship with the state.

— Ashraf Ghani, then President of Afghanistan, in 2021

While Pakistan has been accused of supporting the Afghan Taliban in the past, after the Taliban returned to power in 2021, Afghanistan and Pakistan have repeatedly broken out armed conflicts. The Pakistani government accuses the Afghan Taliban authorities of harboring the Pakistani Taliban rebels in its growing insurgency. Afghan Taliban rejects all allegations from Pakistani side.

=== Saudi Arabia ===
Saudi Arabia has been accused of supporting Taliban. In a December 2009 diplomatic cable to US State Department staff (made public in the diplomatic cable leaks the following year), US Secretary of State Hillary Clinton urged US diplomats to increase efforts to block money from Gulf Arab states from going to terrorists in Pakistan and Afghanistan, writing that "Donors in Saudi Arabia constitute the most significant source of funding to Sunni terrorist groups worldwide" and that "More needs to be done since Saudi Arabia remains a critical financial support base for al-Qaeda, the Taliban, LeT and other terrorist groups."

=== Turkey ===
Turkey has designated Afghan Taliban as a terrorist organization. Amid the US withdrawal from Afghanistan in 2021 Turkish president Recep Tayyip Erdoğan stated during the Brussel's NATO summit on 14 June that Turkey was willing to secure Hamid Karzai International Airport of Kabul, which is considered to play a vital role in maintaining stability and an international presence in Afghanistan. The Taliban has warned Turkey of "severe consequences" if its military remains in Afghanistan when other foreign forces pull out. In July 2021 Zabiullah Mujahid, a Taliban spokesman stated that Taliban wanted "normal ties" with Turkish government, but would consider Turkish Armed Forces as occupiers if they stay after the pull-out.

=== Qatar ===
Qatar in 2013, with the approval of the US and the Afghan government, allowed the Afghan Taliban to set up a diplomatic and political office inside the country. This was done in order to facilitate peace negotiations and with the support of other countries.

Ahmed Rashid, writing in the Financial Times, stated that through the office Qatar has facilitated meetings between the Taliban and many countries and organisations, including the US state department, the UN, Japan, several European governments and non-governmental organisations, all of whom have been trying to push forward the idea of peace talks. In July 2017, Saudi Arabia, at the time in severe conflict with Qatar, without corroboration alleged Qatar to support terrorism including Taliban "armed terrorists".

In September 2017, the presidents of both the United States and Afghanistan demanded Qatar to close down the office of the Taliban. But in February 2020, Qatar facilitated the US–Taliban deal. According to the agreement, the Taliban would cut all its connections with Al-Qaeda and begin peace negotiations with the Afghani Government. In return the United States would begin the withdrawal of its troops.

=== Russia ===
Russia has been accused of arming the Taliban by multiple politicians including Rex Tillerson and the Afghan government. There is no public evidence to substantiate such allegations, and several independent experts are sceptical that Russia materially supported the Taliban in any way. According to the BBC, Russia "is deeply concerned about the rise of Islamist fundamentalism in the region spreading in its direction, and it sees the Taliban as one potential bulwark against this."

In February and again in May 2019, a delegation of Taliban officials and senior Afghan politicians met in Moscow to hold a new round of Afghan peace talks. Reuters reported that "Russian officials as well as religious leaders and elders had asked for a ceasefire."

In June 2020, US intelligence officials assessed with medium confidence that the Russian GRU military-intelligence agency had offered bounties to the Taliban militants to kill coalition forces in Afghanistan. The Pentagon's top leaders said that Russian bounty program has not been corroborated.

On 3 July 2025, Russia became the first country to formally recognize the Taliban's rule of Afghanistan, nearly four years after the Fall of Kabul.

=== United Kingdom ===
After the 9/11 attacks, the United Kingdom froze the Taliban's assets in the UK, nearly $200 million by early October 2001. The UK also supported the US decision to remove the Taliban, both politically and militarily.

The UN agreed that NATO would act on its behalf, focusing on counter-terrorist operations in Afghanistan after the Taliban had been "defeated". The United Kingdom took operational responsibility for Helmand Province, a major poppy-growing province in southern Afghanistan, deploying troops there in mid-2006, and encountered resistance by re-formed Taliban forces allegedly entering Afghanistan from Pakistan. The Taliban turned towards the use of improvised explosive devices.

During 2008 the British government announced plans to pay Taliban fighters to switch sides or lay down their arms; the proceeding year they signalled their support of opening negotiations with the Taliban.

=== United States ===
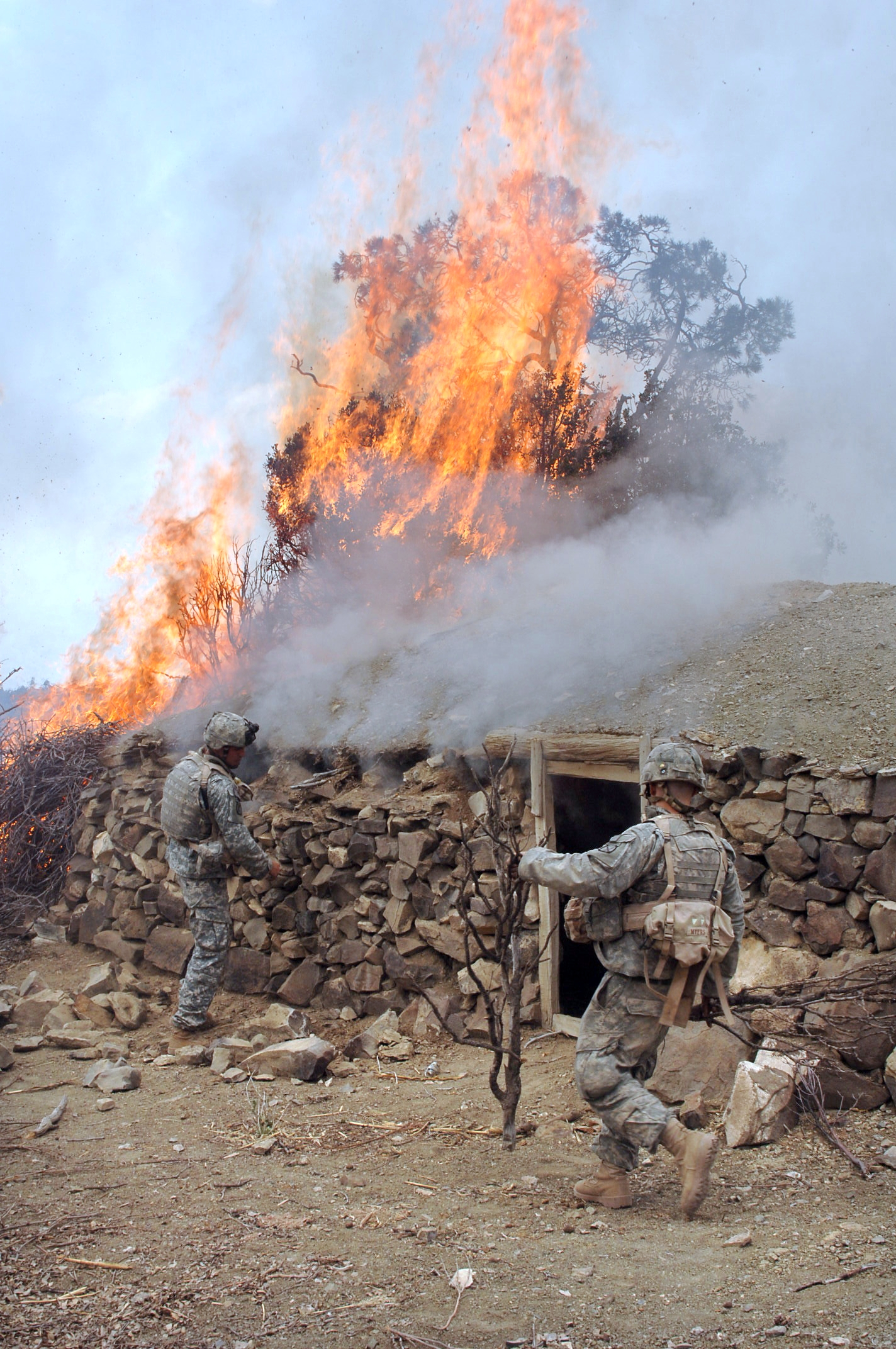
US soldiers burning a suspected Taliban safehouse in March 2007

The United States never recognised the Taliban government in Afghanistan. Ahmed Rashid states that the US indirectly supported the Taliban through its ally in Pakistan between 1994 and 1996 because Washington viewed the Taliban as anti-Iranian, anti-Shia and potentially pro-Western. Washington furthermore hoped that the Taliban would support development planned by the US-based oil company Unocal. For example, it made no comment when the Taliban captured Herat in 1995, and expelled thousands of girls from schools. In late 1997, American Secretary of State Madeleine Albright began to distance the US from the Taliban, and the American-based oil company Unocal withdrew from negotiations on pipeline construction from Central Asia.

One day before the August 1998 capture of Mazar, bin Laden affiliates bombed two US embassies in Africa, killing 224 and wounding 4,500, mostly Africans. The US responded by launching cruise missiles on suspected terrorist camps in Afghanistan, killing over 20 though failing to kill bin Laden or even many Al-Qaeda. Mullah Omar condemned the missile attack and American President Bill Clinton. Saudi Arabia expelled the Taliban envoy in protest over the refusal to turn over bin Laden, and after Mullah Omar allegedly insulted the Saudi royal family. In mid-October the UN Security Council voted unanimously to ban commercial aircraft flights to and from Afghanistan, and freeze its bank accounts worldwide.

Adjusting its counterinsurgency strategy, in October 2009, the US announced plans to pay Taliban fighters to switch sides.

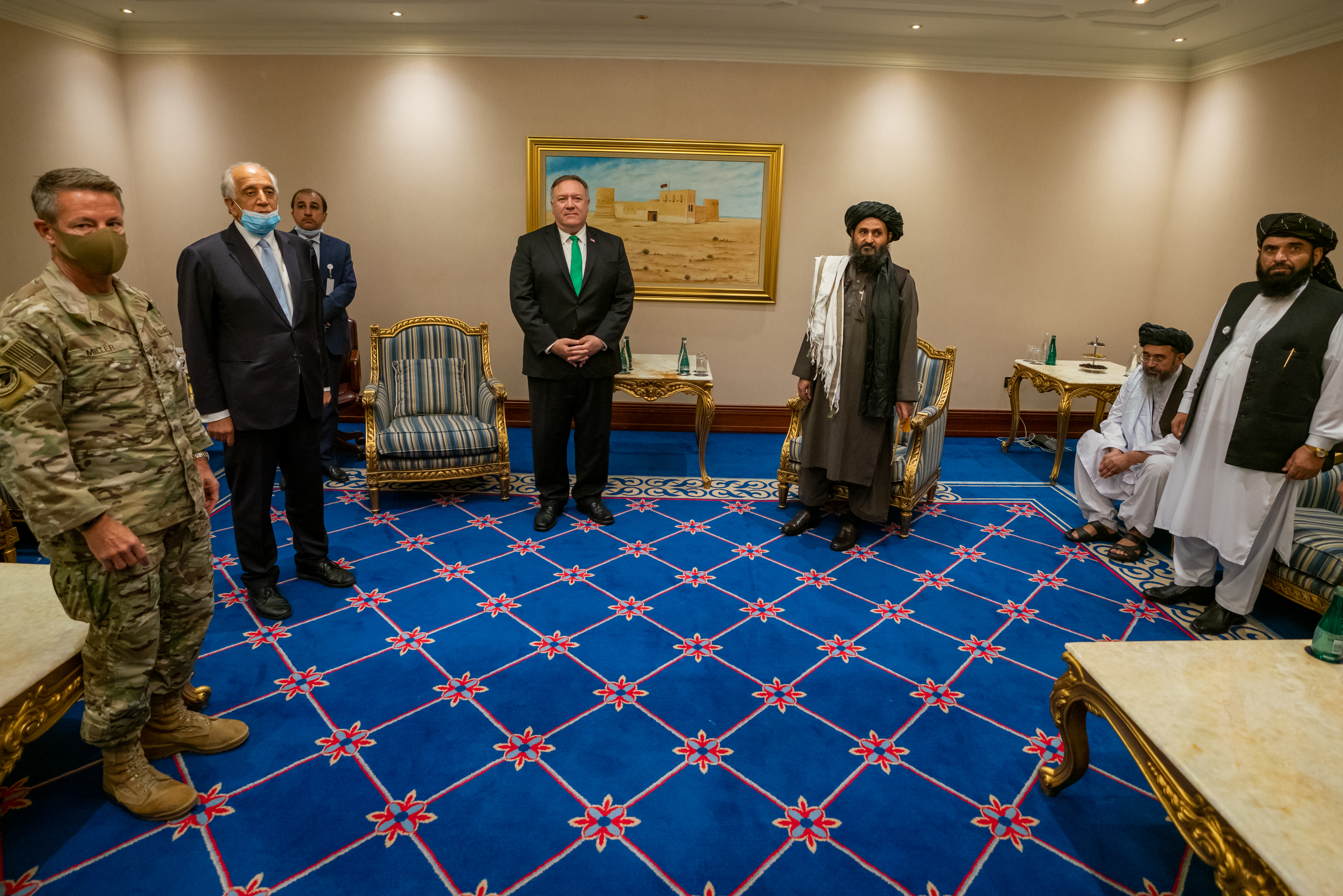
US Secretary of State Mike Pompeo meeting with Taliban delegation in Doha, Qatar, on 12 September 2020

On 26 November 2009, in an interview with CNN's Christiane Amanpour, President Hamid Karzai said there is an "urgent need" for negotiations with the Taliban, and made it clear that the Obama administration had opposed such talks. There was no formal American response.

In December 2009, Asian Times Online reported that the Taliban had offered to give the US "legal guarantees" that they would not allow Afghanistan to be used for attacks on other countries, and that there had been no formal American response.

On 6 December, US officials indicated that they have not ruled out talks with the Taliban. Several days later it was reported that Gates saw potential for reconciliation with the Taliban, but not with Al-Qaeda. Furthermore, he said that reconciliation would politically end the insurgency and the war. But he said reconciliation must be on the Afghan government's terms, and that the Taliban must be subject to the sovereignty of the government.

In 2010, General McChrystal said his troop surge could lead to a negotiated peace with the Taliban.

In an interview with Palgrave Macmillan about relations between the US and the Taliban, American academic Dr. Jonathan Cristol argued that Taliban leaders "have been willing to negotiate, but from a position of relative strength and their goal is no longer a warm relationship with the US—that ship sailed long ago."

On 29 February 2020, the Trump administration signed a conditional peace agreement with the Taliban, which calls for the withdrawal of foreign troops in 14 months if the Taliban uphold the terms of the agreement. In March 2020, the US began a gradual withdrawal of its troops, to which they have agreed in a peace accord with the Taliban.

== Diplomatic recognition ==
Since the Fall of Kabul in 2021, only one member state of the United Nations, Russia, has given diplomatic recognition to the Taliban regime as the legitimate government of Afghanistan. Some countries however have given de facto recognition which makes them functionally recognized by those countries.

In addition, in 2022 the United Nations General Assembly adopted A/RES/77/10 titled "The situation in Afghanistan." The resolution condemns the Taliban government and urges non-recognition.

=== Formal recognition ===
Entity	Date	Notes
Russia	4 July 2025	Russia established diplomatic relations with the Taliban on 9 April 2022. On 4 July 2025, Russia formally recognized the Islamic Emirate of Afghanistan as the official government of Afghanistan.

=== Accepted diplomatic credentials ===
Entity	Date	Notes
China	30 January 2024	On 6 April 2022, China became the first non-Muslim majority country to accept diplomatic credentials from the Taliban. In 2024, President Xi Jinping formally accepted credentials from Mawlawi Asadullah, the ambassador of the Islamic Emirate of Afghanistan, marking the Taliban's official appointment of their ambassador to China.
United Arab Emirates	22 August 2024	The Taliban were handed a Consulate-General in Dubai. The Taliban were handed the embassy in March 2024. The United Arab Emirates accepted the credentials of a Taliban-appointed diplomat as the ambassador of Afghanistan, a UAE official said, making the Gulf state the second country after China to accept a Taliban envoy at that level.
Uzbekistan	10 October 2024	The Taliban were handed a consulate-general in Termez. Later, the Taliban would acquire the embassy. On 10 October 2024, Uzbekistan was the third country to accept an ambassador from the Taliban.

=== De facto diplomatic ties with the Taliban authorities ===
Entity	Date	Notes
Pakistan	28 October 2021	Pakistan became the first country to accept a Taliban-appointed ambassador for its embassy.
Turkmenistan	6 April 2022	Turkmenistan became the first country in Central Asia to hand the Taliban their embassy and consulate.
Iran	June 2022	The Taliban has maintained formal contacts with Iran since took over Kabul. After the Afghan embassy in Tehran was handed over, the Taliban's nominee for Chargé d'Affairs was accredited by Iran in February 2023.
Myanmar	June 2022	Burmese Minister of International Cooperation Ko Ko Hlaing took aim at "externally enforced democratization" and blamed American foreign intervention for the fall of the government.
Qatar	July 2022	
Eritrea	7 November 2022	Eritrea was among 6 countries that voted to unfreeze Taliban assets at the United Nations Human Rights Council.
Venezuela	7 November 2022	Venezuela was among 6 countries that voted to unfreeze Taliban assets at the United Nations Human Rights Council.
Belarus	10 November 2022	In November 2022, the United Nations passed resolution A/RES/77/10 titled "The situation in Afghanistan." The resolution condemned the Taliban government and urged non-recognition. 116 countries voted yes, 10 countries voted to abstain, and 67 did not vote. Belarus was among the ten countries to abstain.
Burundi	10 November 2022	In November 2022, the United Nations passed resolution A/RES/77/10 titled "The situation in Afghanistan." The resolution condemned the Taliban government and urged non-recognition. 116 countries voted yes, 10 countries voted to abstain, and 67 did not vote. Burundi was among the ten countries to abstain.
Ethiopia	10 November 2022	In November 2022, the United Nations passed resolution A/RES/77/10 titled "The situation in Afghanistan." The resolution condemned the Taliban government and urged non-recognition. 116 countries voted yes, 10 countries voted to abstain, and 67 did not vote. Ethiopia was among the ten countries to abstain.
Guinea	10 November 2022	In November 2022, the United Nations passed resolution A/RES/77/10 titled "The situation in Afghanistan." The resolution condemned the Taliban government and urged non-recognition. 116 countries voted yes, 10 countries voted to abstain, and 67 did not vote. Guinea was among the ten countries to abstain.
Nicaragua	10 November 2022	Nicaragua abstained on a United Nations resolution about the Taliban. On 22 June 2024, Nicaragua established diplomatic relations with the Islamic Emirate of Afghanistan and appointed an ambassador to increase ties with the Taliban regime.
North Korea	10 November 2022	In November 2022, the United Nations passed resolution A/RES/77/10 titled "The situation in Afghanistan." The resolution condemned the Taliban government and urged non-recognition. 116 countries voted yes, 10 countries voted to abstain, and 67 did not vote. North Korea was among the ten countries to abstain.
Zimbabwe	10 November 2022	In November 2022, the United Nations passed resolution A/RES/77/10 titled "The situation in Afghanistan." The resolution condemned the Taliban government and urged non-recognition. 116 countries voted yes, 10 countries voted to abstain, and 67 did not vote. Zimbabwe was among the ten countries to abstain.
Kazakhstan	19 April 2023	
Syria	29 September 2023	The Ba'athist Syria had a similar stance to its allies Russia and Iran. However, Afghanistan did not establish ties with Syria until after the establishment of the Syrian transitional government, and the Taliban government was the first to congratulate the Syrian opposition on its victory and the fall of the Assad regime.
India	1 October 2023	Embassy by the Islamic Republic of Afghanistan was closed in October 2023 and two Taliban consulates in Mumbai and Hyberbad were opened.
Malaysia	11 October 2023	On 11 October 2023, the Taliban were handed the embassy in Malaysia.
Kyrgyzstan	20 March 2024	On 23 September, the Kyrgyz government dispatched a team to Kabul under the direction of Taalatbak Masadykov, the deputy head of the security council of Kyrgyzstan. Kyrgyzstan is expected to follow what Kazakhstan did and hand over the embassy to the Taliban. The embassy was handed to the Taliban on 20 March 2024.
Oman	17 September 2024	In September 2024, Oman handed over its Afghan embassy to the Islamic Emirate.
Iraq	26 September 2024	In September 2024, Baghdad handed its embassy over to the Taliban.
Turkey	7 February 2025	In February 2025, Ankara handed its embassy over to the Taliban. In March 2022, Foreign Minister Mevlüt Çavuşoğlu has expressed the intention to internationally recognize the Islamic Emirate.
Azerbaijan	8 February 2025	In February 2025, Baku handed its embassy over to the Taliban.
Egypt	10 February 2025	In February 2025, Cairo handed its embassy over to the Taliban.
Burkina Faso	13 May 2025	In May 2025, the Taliban’s acting ambassador to Iran, Maulvi Fazl Mohammad Haqqani, and Burkina Faso’s ambassador, Mohammad Kabura, met in Tehran and pledged cooperation in trade, agriculture, mining, and vocational training, and planned private‑sector delegations to develop trade relations between Burkina Faso and Afghanistan.
Mali	7 July 2025	In July 2025, Mali abstained on a resolution expressing deep concern over Afghanistan’s deteriorating humanitarian, economic and human rights conditions, urging the Taliban to reverse repressive policies and ensure inclusive governance.

==== Unrecognized or partially recognized сountries ====
Entity	Date	Notes
Abkhazia	February 2023	A delegation of the Islamic Emirate visited Abkhazia in February 2023 and met with the foreign minister.
(Palestine) Gaza Strip (Hamas)	7 October 2023	The Taliban have supplied weapons to Hamas. The Ministry of Foreign Affairs said that the Islamic Emirate had "carefully monitored the recent events in the Gaza Strip" and considered "the occurrence of such events to be the result of Israeli Zionists trampling on the rights of the oppressed Palestinian people and repeated insults and disrespect to Muslim holy places, and any type of defense and the resistance of the Palestinian people for freedom."

== United Nations and NGOs ==
Despite the aid received by Afghanistan from the United Nations (UN) and non-governmental organisations (NGOs) during Taliban rule, the Taliban's attitude in 1996–2001 toward the UN and NGOs was often one of suspicion. The UN did not recognise the Taliban as the legitimate government of Afghanistan, most foreign donors and aid workers were non-Muslims, and the Taliban vented fundamental objections to the sort of 'help' the UN offered. As the Taliban's Attorney General Maulvi Jalil-ullah Maulvizada put it in 1997:

Let us state what sort of education the UN wants. This is a big infidel policy which gives such obscene freedom to women which would lead to adultery and herald the destruction of Islam. In any Islamic country where adultery becomes common, that country is destroyed and enters the domination of the infidels because their men become like women and women cannot defend themselves. Anyone who talks to us should do so within Islam's framework. The Holy Koran cannot adjust itself to other people's requirements, people should adjust themselves to the requirements of the Holy Koran.

In July 1998, the Taliban closed "all NGO offices" by force after those organisations refused to move to a bombed-out former Polytechnic College as ordered. One month later the UN offices were also shut down.

Around 2000, the UN drew up sanctions against officials and leaders of Taliban, because of their harbouring Osama bin Laden. Several of the Taliban leaders have subsequently been killed.

In 2009, British Foreign Secretary Ed Miliband and US Secretary Hillary Clinton had called for talks with 'regular Taliban fighters' while bypassing their top leaders who supposedly were 'committed to global jihad'. Kai Eide, the top UN official in Afghanistan, called for talks with Taliban at the highest level, suggesting Mullah Omar—even though Omar had recently dismissed such overtures as long as foreign troops were in Afghanistan.

In 2010, the UN lifted sanctions on the Taliban, and requested that Taliban leaders and others be removed from terrorism watch lists. In 2010 the US and Europe announced support for President Karzai's latest attempt to negotiate peace with the Taliban.

=== Aga Khan Development Network ===
A special envoy of Prince Karim Aga Khan held a meeting with the Taliban's Deputy Prime Minister Abdul Salam Hanafi in Kabul after the Taliban retook power in Afghanistan. The Aga Khan Development Network (AKDN) is one of the few international organizations which kept its agencies operational in Taliban-led Afghanistan. The Taliban's leadership expresses gratitude to the Ismāʿīli Shias leader Aga Khan, and invites him to visit Kabul.

== Designation as a terrorist organization ==
Although the Taliban was never on the United States Department of State list of Foreign Terrorist Organizations, the Haqqani Network, affiliated with the Taliban's Islamic Emirate, has been designated a terrorist organization by the United States.

The Taliban is officially illegal in the following countries:

Country	References
Canada	
Tajikistan	
Turkey	
United Arab Emirates	

Former:

- Kazakhstan (2005–2023)
- Kyrgyzstan (2006–2024)
- Russia (2003–2025)

=== Militant outfits ===
==== Al-Qaeda ====
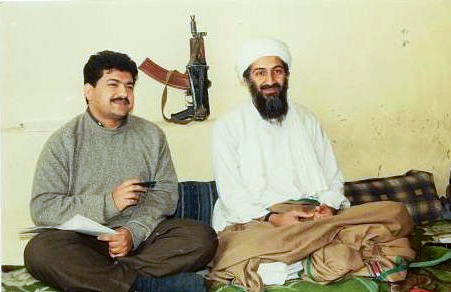
Pakistani journalist Hamid Mir interviewing al-Qaeda leader Osama bin Laden in Afghanistan, between circa 1997 and circa 1998.

In 1996, bin Laden moved to Afghanistan from Sudan. He came without invitation, and sometimes irritated Mullah Omar with his declaration of war and fatwas against citizens of third-party countries, but relations between the two groups improved over time, to the point that Mullah Omar rebuffed his group's patron Saudi Arabia, insulting Saudi minister Prince Turki while reneging on an earlier promise to turn bin Laden over to the Saudis.

Bin Laden was able to forge an alliance between the Taliban and al-Qaeda. The al-Qaeda-trained 055 Brigade integrated with the Taliban army between 1997 and 2001. Several hundred Arab and Afghan fighters sent by bin Laden assisted the Taliban in the Mazar-e-Sharif slaughter in 1998. From 1996 to 2001, the organisation of Osama Bin Laden and Ayman al-Zawahiri had become a virtual state within the Taliban state. The British newspaper The Telegraph stated in September 2001 that 2,500 Arabs under command of Bin Laden fought for the Taliban.

Taliban-al-Qaeda connections were also strengthened by the reported marriage of one of bin Laden's sons to Omar's daughter. While in Afghanistan, bin Laden may have helped finance the Taliban.

After the 1998 US embassy bombings in Africa, bin Laden and several al-Qaeda members were indicted in US criminal court. The Taliban rejected extradition requests by the US, variously claiming that bin Laden had "gone missing", or that Washington "cannot provide any evidence or any proof" that bin Laden was involved in terrorist activities and that "without any evidence, bin Laden is a man without sin... he is a free man."

Military situation as it was on 3 August 2021 Under control of the Afghan Government, NATO, and Allies Under control of the Taliban, Al-Qaeda, and Allies

Evidence against bin Laden included courtroom testimony and satellite phone records. Bin Laden, in turn, praised the Taliban as the "only Islamic government" in existence, and lauded Mullah Omar for his destruction of idols such as the Buddhas of Bamyan.

According to bin Laden, the Taliban were not involved in the 11 September attacks, stating in a tape sent to Al Jazeera: "I am the one responsible... The Afghan people and government knew nothing whatsoever about these events".

At the end of 2008, the Taliban was in talks to sever all ties with al-Qaeda.

In 2011, Alex Strick van Linschoten and Felix Kuehn at New York University's Center on International Cooperation claimed that the two groups did not get along at times before the 11 September attacks, and they have continued to fight since on account of their differences.

In July 2012, an anonymous senior-ranking Taliban commander stated that "Our people consider al-Qaeda to be a plague that was sent down to us by the heavens. Some even concluded that al-Qaeda are actually the spies of America. Originally, the Taliban were naive and ignorant of politics and welcomed al-Qaeda into their homes. But al-Qaeda abused our hospitality." He went on to further claim that about 70% of the Taliban are angry with al-Qaeda, revealing the icy relationship between the two groups.

==== Islamic State – Khorasan Province ====
The Taliban has a negative relationship with the Islamic State – Khorasan Province. The IS started to actively recruit defectors from the Afghan Taliban, in particular, it recruited Afghan Taliban fighters who were disgruntled with their leaders because they lacked battlefield success. This prompted senior Taliban leader Akhtar Mansour to write a letter which was addressed to Abu Bakr al-Baghdadi and in that letter, Akhtar Mansour argued that the war in Afghanistan should be waged under the Taliban's leadership and based on this argument, he asked Abu Bakr al-Baghdadi to order the IS to cease its recruitment drive in Afghanistan. Nevertheless, fighting between the two groups broke out in Nangarhar Province and in June 2015, ISIL was able to seize Afghan territory for the first time. In September 2015, ISIL drove the Taliban out of certain districts of Nangarhar after months of clashes.

In April 2016, the Taliban reported that in Nangarhar Province, a number of senior and mid-level leaders of Wilayah Khorasan had defected from ISIL and pledged allegiance to Taliban leader Akhtar Mansour. The defectors included members of the group's central council, judicial council and prisoners council as well as certain field commanders and fighters.

==== Malakand Taliban ====
Malakand Taliban is a militant outfit led by Sufi Muhammad and his son in law Molvi Fazalullah. Sufi Muhammad is in Pakistani government custody; Molvi Fazalullah is believed to be in Afghanistan. In the last week of May 2011, eight security personnel and civilians fell victim to four hundred armed Taliban who attacked Shaltalo check post in Dir, a frontier District of Khyber Pakhtunkhwa, located a few kilometres away from the Afghan border. Although they have been linked with Waziristan-based Tehreek-e-Taliban Pakistan (TTP), the connection between these two groups was of a symbolic nature.

==== Tehrik-i-Taliban Pakistan (Pakistani Taliban) ====
Before the creation of the Tehrik-i-Taliban (Pakistan), also denoted 'Tehrik e Taliban' some of their leaders and fighters were part of the 8,000 Pakistani militants fighting in the War in Afghanistan (1996–2001) and the War in Afghanistan (2001–2021) against the United Islamic Front and NATO forces. Most of them hail from the Pakistani side of the Af-Pak border regions. After the fall of the Afghan Taliban in late 2001 most Pakistani militants including members of today's TTP fled home to Pakistan.

After the creation of the Tehrik-i-Taliban Pakistan in 2007, headed by Baitullah Mehsud, its members have officially defined goals to establish their rule over Pakistan's Federally Administered Tribal Areas. They engage the Pakistani army in heavy combat operations. Some intelligence analysts believe that the TTP's attacks on the Pakistani government, police and army strained the TTP's relations with the Afghan Taliban.

The Afghan Taliban and the Tehrik-i-Taliban Pakistan differ greatly in their history, leadership and goals although they share a common interpretation of Islam and are both predominantly Pashtun. The Afghan Taliban have no affiliation with the Tehrik-i-Taliban Pakistan and routinely deny any connection to the TTP. The New York Times quoted a spokesman for the Afghan Taliban stating that:

We don't like to be involved with them, as we have rejected all affiliation with Pakistani Taliban fighters ... We have sympathy for them as Muslims, but beside that, there is nothing else between us.

It is alleged that Afghan Taliban relied on support by the Pakistani army in the past and are still supported by them today in their campaign to control Afghanistan. Regular Pakistani army troops allegedly fought alongside the Afghan Taliban in the War in Afghanistan (1996–2001). Major leaders of the Afghan Taliban including Mullah Omar, Jalaluddin Haqqani and Siraj Haqqani are believed to enjoy or have enjoyed safe haven in Pakistan. In 2006 Jalaluddin Haqqani was allegedly called a 'Pakistani asset' by a senior official of Inter-Services Intelligence. Pakistan denies any links with Haqqani or other terrorist groups. Haqqani himself has denied any links with Pakistan as well.

Afghan Taliban leader Mullah Omar asked the Tehrik-i-Taliban Pakistan in late 2008 and early 2009 to stop attacks inside Pakistan, to change their focus as an organisation and to fight the Afghan National Army and ISAF forces in Afghanistan instead. In late December 2008 and early January 2009 he sent a delegation, led by former Guantanamo Bay detainee Mullah Abdullah Zakir, to persuade leading members of the TTP to put aside differences with Pakistan.

Some regional experts state the common name "Taliban" may be more misleading than illuminating. Gilles Dorronsoro, a scholar of South Asia currently at the Carnegie Endowment for International Peace in Washington says:

The fact that they have the same name causes all kinds of confusion.

As the Pakistani Army began offensives against the Pakistani Taliban, many unfamiliar with the region thought incorrectly that the assault was against the Afghan Taliban of Mullah Omar which was not the case.

The Pakistani Taliban were put under sanctions by UN Security Council for terrorist attacks in Pakistan and the 2010 Times Square car bombing attempt.

=== Pledge of allegiance ===
Many designated terror groups have pledged their allegiance to the new Taliban government, these groups include: Al Qaeda, al Shabaab, Boko Haram, Jemaah Islamiyah, Jama'at Nasr al-Islam wal-Muslimin and Ansar al-Sharia in Libya, Tehreek-e-Taliban, Harkat-ul-Mujahideen

According to some reports Jaish-e-Mohammad and Lashkar-e-Taiba, which have allegedly close ties to Pakistan's intelligence agency, have joined ISIS-K and ended their allegiance to Mullah Hibatullah.

The East Turkestan Movement and the Islamic Movement of Uzbekistan both distanced themself from the Taliban and ended their allegiance after the Talibans Zabul operation against Uyghurs in 2014, however newer reports indicate that those groups still have good relations with the Taliban.

== Bibliography ==
- Griffiths, John C. (2001), Afghanistan: A History of Conflict, London: Carlton Books, ISBN 978-1-84222-597-4
- Hillenbrand, Carole (2015), Islam: A New Historical Introduction, London: Thames & Hudson, ISBN 978-0-500-11027-0
- Matinuddin, Kamal (1999), The Taliban Phenomenon: Afghanistan 1994–1997, Karachi: Oxford University Press, ISBN 0-19-579274-2
- Wright, Lawrence (2006). The looming tower : Al-Qaeda and the road to 9/11. New York: Knopf. ISBN 978-0-375-41486-2.
