= Ahmadullah Wasiq =

Deputy head of the Taliban's cultural commission

Acting Head of the General Directorate of Olympics, Physical Education and Sports (unrecognized)
- Incumbent
- Assumed office 2023
- Preceded by: Nazar Mohammad Mutmaeen

Deputy Head of Cultural Commission
- Incumbent
- Assumed office 15 August 2021

Deputy Central Spokesman of the Islamic Emirate of Afghanistan
- Incumbent
- Assumed office 25 October 2021 Serving with Inamullah Samangani; Maulvi Asadullah (Bilal Karimi)
- Central Spokesman: Zabiullah Mujahid

Personal details
- Born: Afghanistan

Military service
- Allegiance: Afghanistan
- Branch/service: Cultural Commission
- Battles/wars: War in Afghanistan (2001-2021)

Ahmadullah Wasiq (Pashto: احمد اللہ وثیق [ahmadʊˈlɑ waˈsiq]) is an Afghan politician who serves as Director General of Physical Education and Sports of the Islamic Emirate of Afghanistan. Since 25 October 2021 he has also served as Deputy Central Spokesman of the Islamic Emirate of Afghanistan alongside Inamullah Samangani and Maulvi Asadullah (Bilal Karimi). He is from Ghazni Province.

On 26 August 2021, Wasiq, along with Anas Haqqani, visited the Afghanistan Cricket Board. They met with cricket board officials and national players and assured them of all possible cooperation for the promotion of cricket.

He currently served as acting head of the General Directorate of Olympics, Physical Education and Sports under the Taliban regime.

== Al Emara Press Reporter ==
Throughout early 2020 to mid 2021, Ahmadullah appeared as the host of Al Emara frequently interviewing Taliban figures around Taliban-controlled territories throughout the country. It is believed that he has a significant importance in the Taliban's media offices along with Abdul Qahar Balkhi.

== See also ==
- Politics of Afghanistan
- Sher Mohammad Abbas Stanikzai
- Anas Haqqani
- Abdul Qahar Balkhi
- Suhail Shaheen
- Zabiullah Mujahid
- Tariq Ghazniwal
