= Charlotte Bellis =

New Zealand journalist

Charlotte Bellis is a New Zealand journalist who previously reported for Al Jazeera. Bellis attracted media attention in August 2021 after interviewing a senior Taliban leader Abdul Qahar Balkhi following the fall of Kabul. In early 2022, Bellis attracted media attention in New Zealand and abroad after highlighting her difficulty in returning home due to the country's tough COVID-19 border restrictions.

== Personal life ==
Bellis was born in Christchurch, New Zealand and attended Selwyn House School. She studied journalism at the University of Missouri in Columbia, Missouri, and returned to New Zealand in 2009. As of June 2022, she lived in Christchurch with her partner Jim Huylebroek and their daughter.

== Journalistic career ==
She started her journalism career as a television reporter in Christchurch, and later presented Prime News and news programme 60 Minutes in New Zealand. She was made redundant by Prime News in February 2015 and took a job with ABC World News in New York the following month. In 2017 she started working for Al Jazeera news network in their Doha, Qatar offices.

=== Coverage of the 2021 Taliban offensive ===
From July 2021, she was stationed in Kabul, Afghanistan and reported on the fall of the country to the Taliban. At the first press conference given by the Taliban in Kabul, Bellis was one of the three women present. Her asking about women's rights at that press conference drew international attention to herself. Some days later, she was granted a personal interview with Abdul Qahar Balkhi, a Taliban leader and a member of their Cultural Commission. In the interview, New Zealand was praised for its recent humanitarian support, with NZ$3 million given to two international aid agencies for refugee support.

On 21 August, Bellis told the New Zealand news broadcaster Newshub that she would remain in Kabul despite the Taliban takeover in order to hold them to account; stating that "they'll [the Taliban] have to drag me out of here. I'm not leaving any time soon." On 29 August Bellis told Radio New Zealand that she would remain in Afghanistan as long as she could. On 14 October 2021, news media reported that she had left Afghanistan, but on 20 October she was again seen reporting live from Kabul.

=== Attempts to return to New Zealand ===
Due to Qatar's extramarital pregnancy laws, Bellis resigned from Al Jazeera in November 2021 after becoming pregnant with her partner Jim Huylebroek, a photographer and contributor to The New York Times. Unable to remain in Belgium on a long term basis due to visa issues, the couple headed to Afghanistan, the only other place where they reportedly had visas to live. She could not return home immediately due to New Zealand's border restrictions and ended up seeking help from the Taliban. According to Bellis, the group's senior contacts told her, "Just tell people you're married and if it escalates, call us. Don't worry." On 28 January, Chris Bunny, head of New Zealand's Managed Isolation and Quarantine (MIQ) system, said that staff had contacted Bellis about making another application that would fit the requirements for emergency travel.

Bellis' difficulty in securing a place in MIQ was highlighted by the opposition ACT party leader David Seymour, the National Party's COVID-19 Response spokesperson Chris Bishop, and National Party leader Christopher Luxon as an example of what they regarded as the failure of the MIQ "lottery" allocation system for citizens trying to return to their country.

Besides coverage by national media including Stuff and The New Zealand Herald, Bellis' case was covered by several international media including The Guardian, GB News, The Washington Post, ABC News, and the Sydney Morning Herald. In addition, media coverage of Bellis' story drew criticism from human rights activists, observers and Afghans including Austrian-Afghan journalist Emran Feroz, New Zealand-Afghan journalist Muzhgan Samarqandi, Human Rights Watch researcher Sahar Fetrat, and UK-based human rights activist Farahnaz Roman for reinforcing the unequal treatment of Afghans and non-Afghans and deflecting attention from Taliban human rights abuses against Afghan women and journalists.

On 31 January, Bellis claimed during an interview with Radio New Zealand that the MIQ system did not have provisions for pregnant women and that the application process was difficult and confusing due to the technicalities and clauses. Bellis also confirmed that an unidentified third country had offered the couple asylum. That same day, COVID-19 Response Minister Chris Hipkins issued a statement that the Government had offered Bellis a place under the emergency allocation criteria to travel to New Zealand within a period of 14 days. However, Hipkins claimed that Bellis had indicated that she did not intend to travel until late February and that MIQ had advised her to consider moving her travel plans forward. He also confirmed that New Zealand consular assistance had twice offered to help her return from Afghanistan in December 2021.

In response to Hipkins' statement, Bellis' lawyer Tudor Clee criticised the Minister for allegedly breaching her client's privacy by sharing personal details in his press statement and indicated that she was considering "legal options." Bellis also stated that she did not give Hipkins consent to share her information and disputed the facts in his statement. Clee also disputed Hipkin's remarks about the effectiveness of the emergency allocation system, citing the low success rate for pregnant applicants. National and ACT Members of Parliament Bishop and Seymour also criticised Hipkins for breaching Bellis' privacy, describing his actions as unbecoming of a Minister of the Crown.

On 1 February 2022, Deputy Prime Minister Grant Robertson confirmed that the Ministry of Business, Innovation and Employment (MBIE) had offered places in managed isolation for both Bellis and Huylebroek. Bellis accepted the Government's offer but stated that she would continue to challenge the Government's MIQ system for New Zealanders seeking to return home.

On 22 June, Hipkins publicly apologised for releasing personal information without Bellis' consent and making "inaccurate comments," which had caused her distress. As a result, Bellis and Huylebroek had experienced abusive messages online. Hipkins had mistakenly believed that Bellis had travelled to Afghanistan and had been offered consular assistance. Hipkins had earlier privately apologised to Bellis on 15 March. In response, Bellis defended her role in exposing problems associated with the MIQ system.
