= Inamullah Samangani =

Deputy Central Spokesman of the Islamic Emirate of Afghanistan

- انعام‌الله سمنگانی

Deputy Central Spokesman of the Islamic Emirate of Afghanistan
- Incumbent
- Assumed office 25 October 2021 Serving with Ahmadullah Wasiq; Maulvi Asadullah (Bilal Karimi)
- Central Spokesman: Zabiullah Mujahid

Personal details
- Born: Afghanistan

Military service
- Allegiance: Afghanistan
- Branch/service: Cultural Commission

Inamullah Samangani (Persian: انعام‌الله سمنگانی, romanized: Inʿāmullāh Samangānī) is an Afghan politician who is currently serving as the deputy central spokesman of the Islamic Emirate of Afghanistan alongside Ahmadullah Wasiq and Bilal Karimi since 25 October 2021. He is also a member of the Taliban cultural commission.

== History ==
In October 2021 he visited Uzbekistan with a delegation led by the Second Deputy Prime Minister, Abdul Salam Hanafi.
