= Four Afghan Steeds =

Four portraits of Afghan horses

- Artist: Giuseppe Castiglione
- Year: 1763
- Dimensions: 40.7 cm × 297.1 cm (16.0 in × 117.0 in)
- Location: National Palace Museum

Four Afghan Steeds
- Traditional Chinese: 愛烏罕四駿圖
- Simplified Chinese: 爱乌罕四骏图
Transcriptions
Standard Mandarin
- Hanyu Pinyin: Àiwūhǎn sìjùn tú

Four Afghan Steeds (Chinese: 愛烏罕四駿圖) is a series of four portraits of Afghan horses donated to the Qianlong Emperor of China in 1763 by Emir Ahmad Shah of Afghanistan, and painted on a silk roll by the Milanese Jesuit missionary Giuseppe Castiglione. These paintings, commissioned shortly before Castiglione's death, present detailed information about each of the horses, in four languages: Uyghur, Chinese, Manchurian and Mongolian. It is considered one of Castiglione's most famous works and are now kept at the National Palace Museum in Taiwan along with other art featuring horses by Castiglione.

== Context ==
The Afghan state at the time (the Durrani Empire) was southwest of Badakhshan which constituted the westernmost vassal state in the Muslim confines of the Qing Empire. During the twelfth lunar month to the 28th year of the reign of the Qianlong Emperor (1763) the Afghan Emir Ahmad Shah Abdali donated by sending four excellent horses. He also sent an emissary to Beijing to present him with a diplomatic certificate in gold leaf containing information about this donation of purebred horses. The Qianlong Emperor also composed a song about these "Four Afghan Couriers". However, the Afghans failed to make a good impression to the Qianlong Emperor as they refused to perform a kowtow. The event came during uneasy Sino-Afghan relations and threats of war regarding Qing's expansion into Turkic Central Asia.

Afterwards, the Qianlong Emperor commissioned Castiglione, who was 74, the portrait of the four horses that Durrani Afghans had just given him. It is possible that the emperor was inspired by the Five Horses painting by Li Gonglin. This is one of Castiglione's last works, and his last known portrait of horses.

== Description ==
The paintings of Giuseppe Castiglione show the bodies of horses in full, their manes being of a different color from the body. He represented them from different angles, suggesting movement through the lifting of the limbs. He also indicated a light source to attenuate the tints, and thus give the horses a volumetric effect.

The horses represented are of a finer, more dashing and less round model than those of the Castiglione's Ten Couriers.

These paintings feature inscriptions in Chinese, Manchurian, Mongolian and Uyghur, indicating the name, height and length of the horses. Taken individually, these inscriptions seem to be just translations of one another.

=== Chao'er cong ===
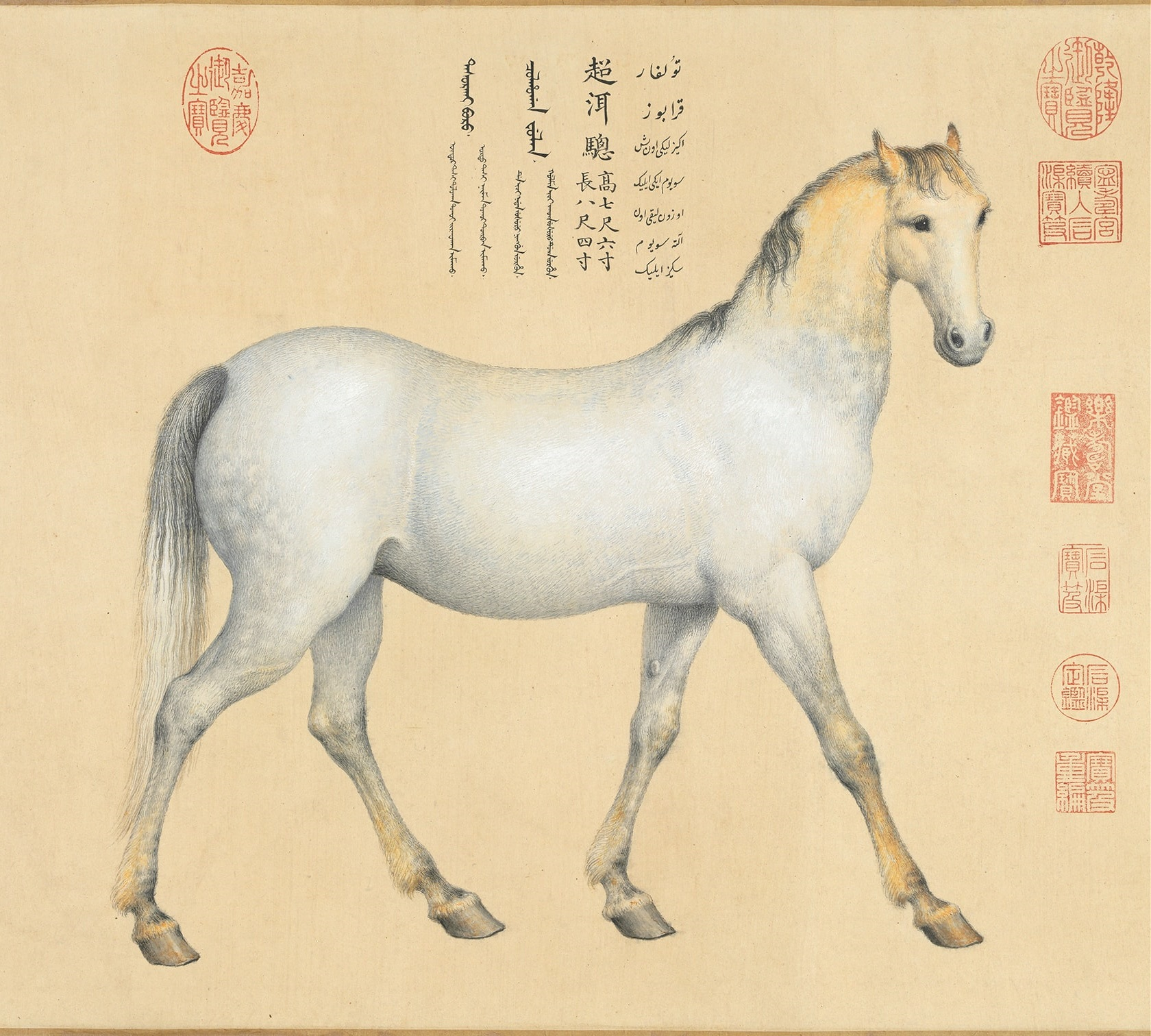
Chao'er cong (超洱驄), "Piebald leaping over Erhai Lake".

The horse, which is the first to appear when it is unrolled, walks to the right and is a gray horse. While the Chinese name refers to it as "piebald", the Mongol and Uyghur names seem closer to the light plain colour of the horse depicted.

=== Laiyuan liu ===
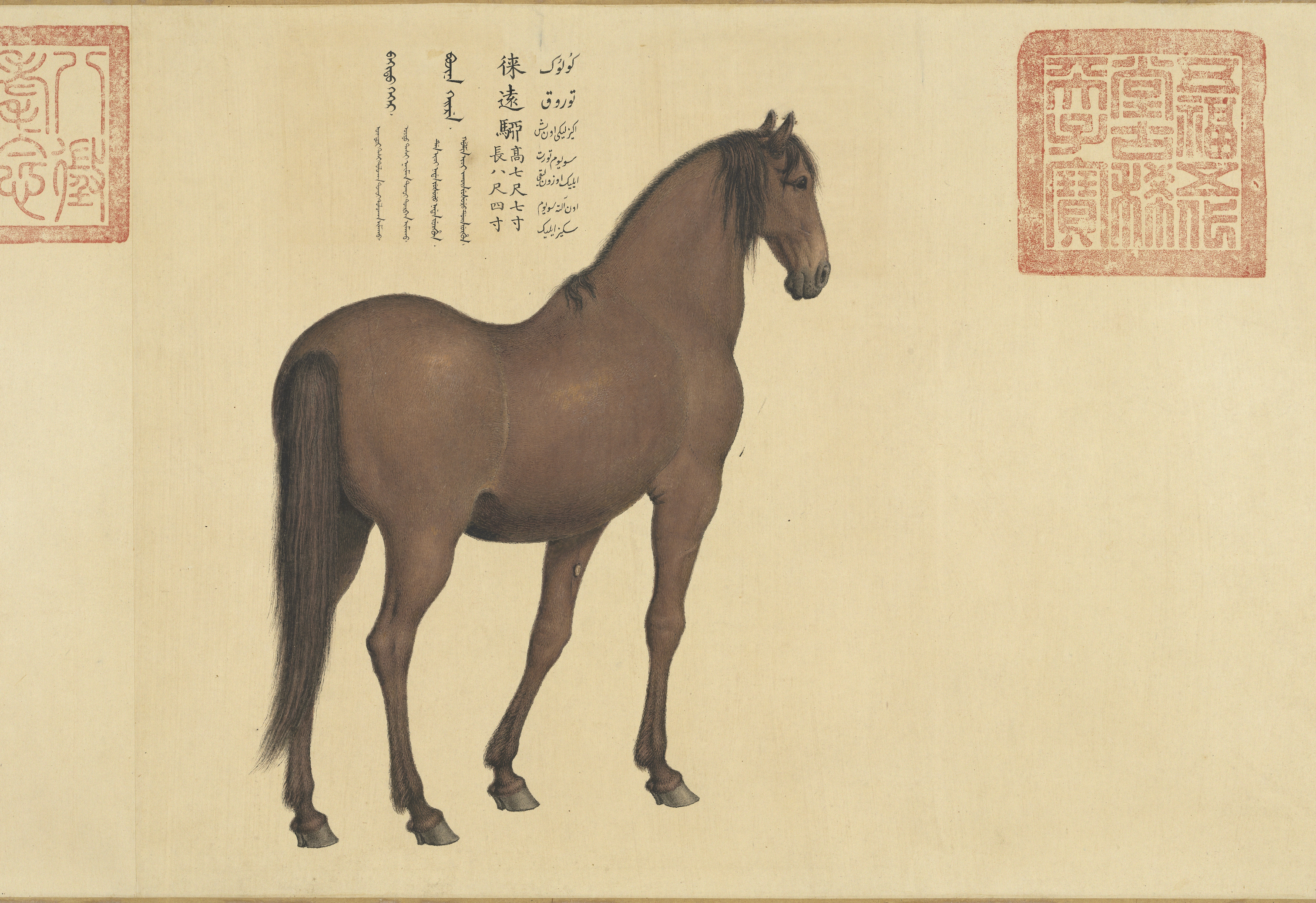
Laiyuan liu (徠遠騮), "Roan of Laiyuan".

This horse is shown three-quarter back, facing to the right, and wearing a burnt chestnut coat. The Chinese name may refer to the Qing-era office in the West, Laiyuan si, but based on the name in the other languages, it may be trying to suggest a vigorous horse that can travel long distances.

=== Yueku lai ===
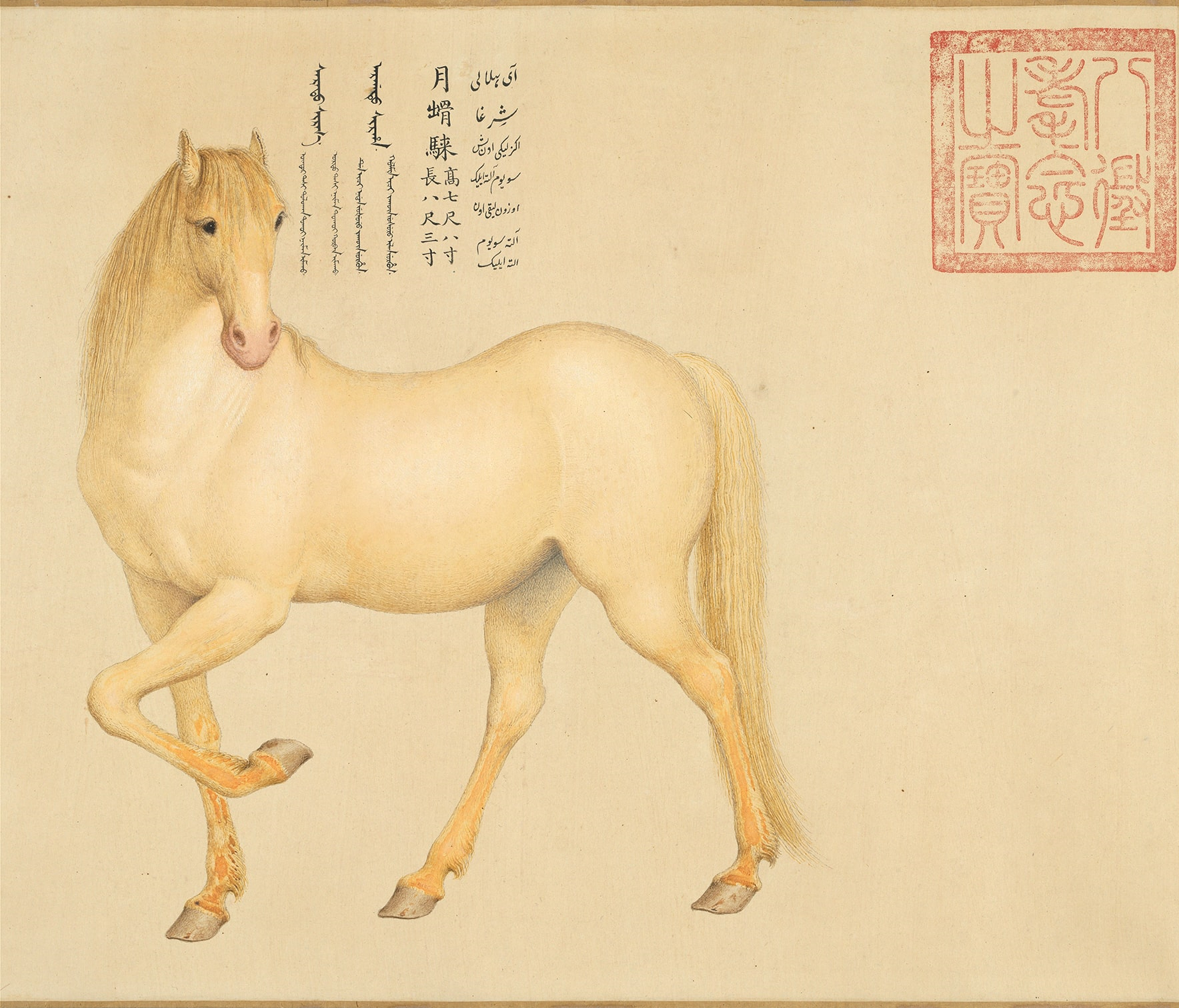
Yueku lai (月骨騋), "Large horse with crescent blaze".

This horse walking to the left is depicted in yellow color, possibly a palomino coat. The name of the horse, Yueku lai, has been the subject of interpretations and translations. When written 月窟, yueku is used in some classical Chinese texts to refer to the location of the moon or the light of the moon. Lai designates a horse over seven chi tall. The word yueku in Chinese may being referring to a county in the West.

The Manchurian inscription is argatu sirha; argatu denotes a stag or male roe deer, and sirha is a variant of sirga, denoting a color of reddish-brown in horses and deer. The reference to deer is probably to be understood as a reference to the male's pale coat color. The word sirga seems to refer to a light color.

=== Lingkun bai ===
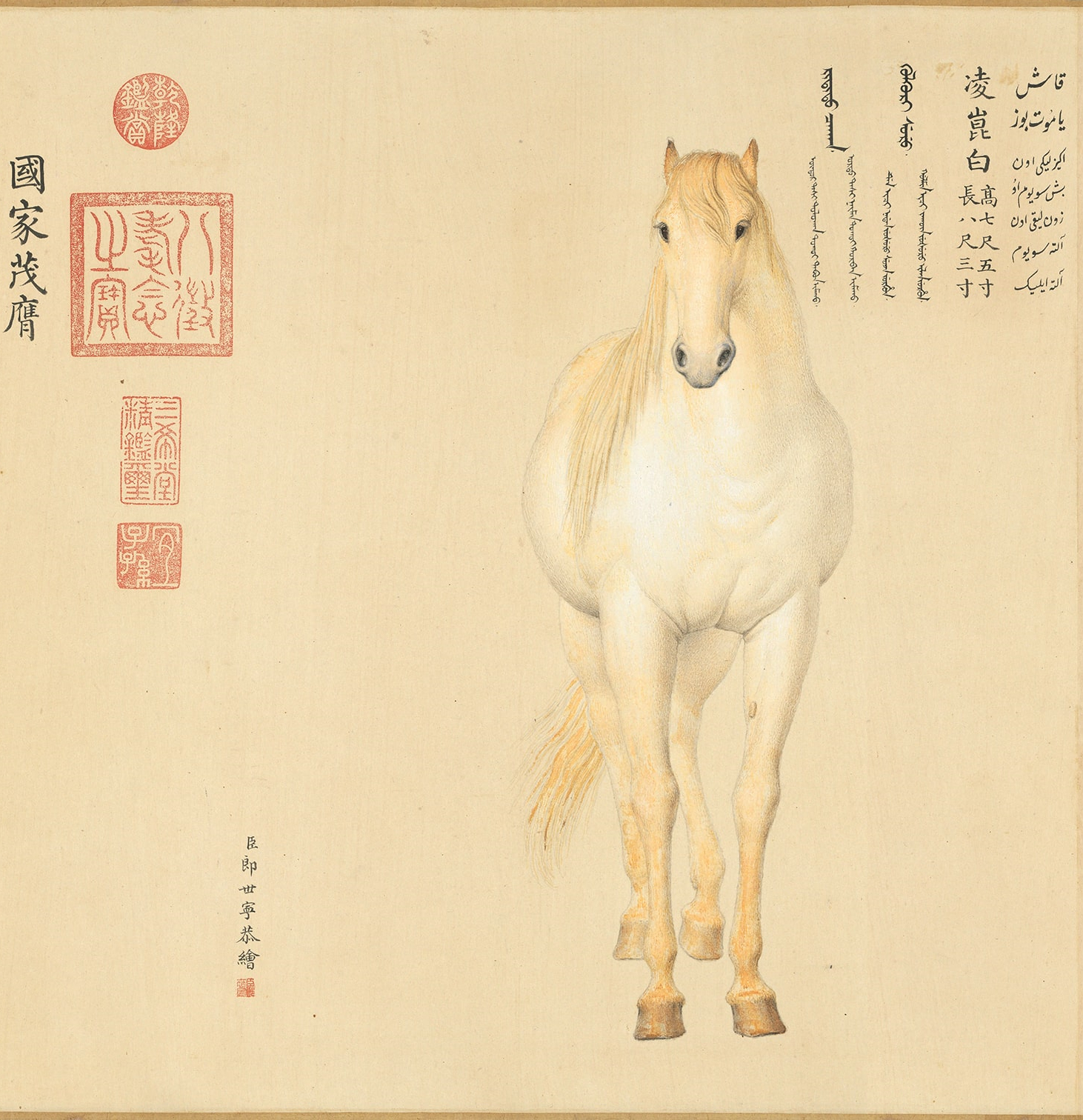
Lingkun bai (凌昆白), "White horse that ascends Kunlun mountains".

Represented from the front, this horse has a gray coat. The name in Chinese is a reference to the Kunlun Mountains, being used here to indicate high mountains in general. The Mongol name means "magic white horse".

== Analysis ==
The horses represented do not have an identifiable sex, which a contemporary French author attributed to the modesty of Castiglione, who received a Jesuit education. The hair and the bottom of the limbs of these horses appear to be dyed with henna, consistent with Afghan, Indian and Persian tradition.

== Bibliography ==
- Ai-li, Luo (2013). "Interpretations of the Uyghur Inscriptions of the Painting of Four Steeds of Afghan". The National Palace Museum Research Quarterly. Vol. 30, no. 4.
- Beurdeley, Cécile; Beurdeley, Michel (1971). C.E. Tuttle Co. (ed.). Giuseppe Castiglione: a Jesuit painter at the court of the Chinese emperors. Lund Humphries. ISBN 0-8048-0987-9.
- Cartier, Michel (2004). Éditions Favre (ed.). Giuseppe Castiglione dit Lang Shining (1688–1766) (in French). Lausanne.
- Schäfer, Dagmar Roel; Sterckx; Siebert, Martina (2018). Cambridge University Press (ed.). Animals Through Chinese History: earliest times to 1911. Cambridge, United Kingdom/New York, NY. ISBN 978-1-108-42815-6.
