= Embassy of Afghanistan, Beijing =

Embassy of the Islamic Emirate of Afghanistan in Beijing
- Location: Beijing
- Address: No. 8, Dongzhimenwai Street, Chaoyang, Beijing
- Opened: 1955
- Ambassador: Bilal Karimi
- Jurisdiction: China / Mongolia

The Embassy of the Islamic Emirate of Afghanistan in China (Pashto: په چین کې د افغانستان سفارت : Dari: سفارت افغانستان در چین) is the diplomatic mission of Afghanistan in China. The embassy is located at No. 8 Dongzhimenwai Street, Chaoyang District, Beijing. The embassy also oversees Afghanistan's diplomatic affairs in Mongolia.

== History ==
The Kingdom of Afghanistan established diplomatic relations with the Republic of China in 1944 and exchanged embassies in 1945. After the founding of the People's Republic of China, the Kingdom of Afghanistan announced its recognition of the government of the People's Republic of China in January 1950, and established diplomatic relations on 20 January 1955, exchanging ambassadors.

On 15 August 2021, the Islamic Republic of Afghanistan collapsed under the attack of the Taliban, and the embassy lost contact with Afghanistan. In January 2022, the last ambassador of the Islamic Republic of Afghanistan, Qaim, parked five cars in front of the main building of the embassy and left the car keys in his office, and announced his resignation. Subsequently, the embassy was taken over by the Taliban, and the embassy currently flies the flag of the Islamic Emirate of Afghanistan. In January 2024, Chinese President Xi Jinping accepted the credentials presented by Bilal Karimi, the new ambassador to China sent by the Islamic Emirate of Afghanistan. Subsequently, the name of the institution was changed to Embassy of the Islamic Emirate of Afghanistan in Beijing.
