= Abdul Qahar Balkhi =

Afghan Foreign Ministry spokesperson since 2021

- عبدالقهار بلخي

Spokesperson for the Ministry of Foreign Affairs
- Incumbent
- Assumed office 17 August 2021
- Minister: Amir Khan Muttaqi

Personal details
- Born: July 15, 1988 (age 38) Baghlan Province, Afghanistan
- Party: Taliban
- Occupation: Minister
- Religion: Islam
- Denomination: Sunni
- Jurisprudence: Hanafi
- Movement: Deobandi

Military service
- Allegiance: Afghanistan
- Branch/service: Cultural Commission
- Battles/wars: War in Afghanistan (2001–2021)

Abdul Qahar Balkhi (Pashto: عبدالقهار بلخي [ˈabdʊl qaˈhɑr balˈxi]; born July 15, 1988) is a politician in Afghanistan, currently serving as a spokesperson of the Ministry of Foreign Affairs. He was designated as a member of the Taliban's Cultural Commission after the August 2021 fall of Kabul until his exact role in the Taliban government was later determined. He also served the Taliban media office in the early 2010s.

Balkhi first appeared publicly at the Taliban's first press conference on 17 August 2021 in Kabul. During the press conference, he interpreted for the spokesman Zabihullah Mujahid. On 22 August 2021, he was interviewed by Charlotte Bellis of Al Jazeera in the group's first official interview. During the interview, he thanked New Zealand for providing financial support to Afghanistan following the takeover, given their donations to the United Nations and the Red Cross.

== Video letter to U.S. Congress ==
On 17 November 2021, in an open letter addressed to the U.S. Congress, Taliban's acting Foreign Minister Amir Khan Muttaqi appealed to unfreeze Afghan central bank assets worth $US9 billion to avert a humanitarian catastrophe. Balkhi also tweeted a video recording of the letter, marking a new era in Taliban's Twitter diplomacy.

== Personal life ==
Balkhi is fluent in multiple languages, including English. He is a former New Zealand resident, and some of his family still reside there.

== See also ==
- Ahmadullah Wasiq
- Suhail Shaheen
- Zabiullah Mujahid
- Tariq Ghazniwal
