= Embassy of China, Kabul =

Embassy of the People's Republic of China in Afghanistan
- Location: Kabul
- Ambassador: Zhao Xing

The Embassy of the People's Republic of China in Afghanistan is the diplomatic mission of China in Afghanistan.

== History ==
After the Chinese government made announcement condemning the Soviet military invasion of Afghanistan on 30 December 1979, and refused to recognize the Soviet-backed Karmal government, the official relationship was stopped, and the Chinese embassy was degraded to representative office, and only dealt with consular and visa issues.

The embassy was kept open after the Taliban takeover in 2021.
