= Tariq Ghazniwal =

Journalist for Al Emara Media office of the Taliban

Tariq Ghazniwal طارق غزنیوال

Spokesperson for the Islamic Emirate of Afghanistan
- Incumbent
- Assumed office 6 September 2021
- Minister: Amir Khan Muttaqi

Personal details
- Born: Afghanistan

Military service
- Allegiance: Afghanistan
- Battles/wars: War in Afghanistan (2001-2021)

Tariq Ghazniwal is one of several spokespersons for the Islamic Emirate of Afghanistan. He has distributed statements to the media by email in response to the assault on Marjah, the death of Osama bin Laden, and Western intervention in Libya.

== See also ==
- Zabiullah Mujahid
- Abdul Qahar Balkhi
