= Zabihullah Mujahid =

Deputy Information Minister of Afghanistan since 2021

- ذبيح الله مجاهد
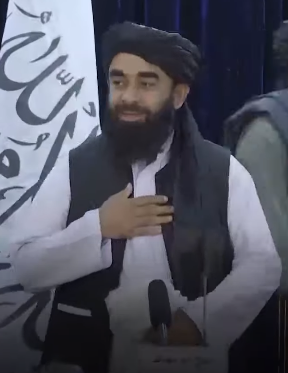
- Mujahid in 2021

Deputy Minister of Information and Culture
- Incumbent
- Assumed office 7 September 2021 (Note: Acting: 7 September 2021 – 15 August 2025)
- Supreme Leader: Hibatullah Akhundzada
- Prime Minister: Hasan Akhund
- Minister: Khairullah Khairkhwa

Spokesman of the Islamic Emirate of Afghanistan
- Incumbent
- Assumed office 25 October 2021
- Deputy: Inamullah Samangani; Ahmadullah Wasiq; Maulvi Asadullah (Bilal Karimi)

Personal details
- Born: Tahir Shah Siddiqi; 7 February 1978 (age 48) Gardez District, Paktia Province, Republic of Afghanistan
- Party: (Afghanistan) Taliban
- Children: 5
- Occupation: Spokesman

Tahir Shah Siddiqi (Pashto; Dari: طاهرشاه صدیقی), commonly known by his nom de guerre Zabihullah Mujahid (Pashto; Dari: ذبیح الله مجاهد, Ẕabīḥullāh Mujāhid), is an Afghan spokesperson who has been the chief spokesman for the Taliban regime or the Islamic Emirate of Afghanistan since 25 October 2021 and their Deputy Minister of Information and Culture since 7 September 2021. He has long served as one of several spokesmen for the Taliban, the others being Suhail Shaheen and Yousef Ahmadi. Mujahid commented mainly on the Taliban's activities in eastern, northern, and central Afghanistan, while Ahmadi focused on the western and southern regions. In addition to being the government's main spokesman, Mujahid serves as a personal spokesman for Supreme Leader Hibatullah Akhundzada.

Mujahid appeared publicly in person on 17 August 2021. Prior to that, he regularly communicated with journalists and spoke on behalf of the Taliban via cellphone calls, text messages, emails, Twitter, and postings on Islamist websites. Mujahid was appointed in January 2007 following the arrest of Taliban spokesman Muhammad Hanif.

== Early life and family ==
Born in 1978 in the Gardez District of Paktia province, he received his early education in Islamic seminaries from different cities of Afghanistan as well the Darul Uloom Haqqania in Khyber Pakhtunkhwa, Pakistan, where he specialized in Islamic jurisprudence, writing different research papers in the field as well.

He began fighting at the age of 16 and later became a writer in Dari for a Taliban magazine before serving as an anchor for a Taliban radio in both Pashto and Dari.

He is married with four children. His mother died in October 2021.

== Taliban spokesman ==
Tahir Shah Siddiqi adopted the pseudonym "Zabihullah Mujahid" during the Taliban insurgency. He became the Taliban's spokesman in January 2007 following the arrest of Muhammad Hanif by the National Directorate of Security (NDS), in the border town of Torkham while crossing from Pakistan. As a Taliban spokesman, Mujahid communicated the group's message to Afghan and international media. He has been responsible for confirming or denying involvement in attacks across Afghanistan and also released videos on his Twitter account showing the Taliban's activity throughout the conflict.

On 21 April 2017, Mujahid claimed Taliban responsibility for an attack on an army base in Mazar-i-Sharif that killed more than 140 soldiers. On 21 January 2019, Mujahid claimed Taliban responsibility for an attack on a training centre of the National Directorate of Security (NDS) that killed over 100 security personnel. On 29 November 2020, Mujahid claimed responsibility for an attack on army base in Afghanistan that killed 30 security personnel.

On 17 July 2021, Mujahid apologized for the death of Reuters' Indian journalist Danish Siddiqui, who was killed in a clash between Afghan forces and Taliban. Mujahid claimed the Taliban were not aware of how Siddiqui died, asking journalists to inform the Taliban before entering war zone so that the group can "take proper care of that particular individual".

=== Contested identity before 2021 ===
As of 2011, the US military claimed that Mujahid was not a single individual, but a persona by that name that was used by multiple Taliban spokespeople. However, some journalists said that they recognized his voice and that they had been communicating with the same individual for several years.

A man claiming to be Mujahid was interviewed with his back towards the TV camera in early 2009 by CNN reporter Nic Robertson. Robertson described the man as close to 30 years old, bearded, and slightly over 6 feet (1.83 m) tall. After the CNN interview was broadcast in May 2009, the Zabiullah Mujahid that journalists had been speaking to via cellphone claimed that the interviewee was an impostor. One intelligence analyst said that the man interviewed by CNN was one of multiple individuals using the persona, but that the man was disowned because his superiors were unhappy with the interview. The analyst said, "There's no way Zabiullah Mujahid could be one person... No one person could take that many calls from the media."

=== Public reveal ===
Mujahid first appeared publicly and showed his face on 17 August 2021, two days after the fall of Kabul, at the Taliban's first press conference along with Abdul Qahar Balkhi in Kabul, Afghanistan, where he answered questions of local and international media teams. He is fluent in both Pashto and Dari Persian languages.

In an interview with The Express Tribune, published on 12 September 2021, Mujahid states that "They [US and Afghan National Forces] used to think I did not exist." He then says "I escaped so many times from their raids and attempts to capture me that they seriously considered that 'Zabiullah' was a made up figure, not a real man who exists", referring to his evasion of being captured.

Western nations suspended humanitarian aid to Afghanistan following the Taliban's takeover of the country in August 2021 and the World Bank and International Monetary Fund also halted payments. The US government froze about $9 billion in assets belonging to the Afghan central banks, blocking the Taliban from accessing billions of dollars held in U.S. bank accounts. On 11 November 2021, the Human Rights Watch reported that Afghanistan is facing widespread famine due to collapsed economy and broken banking system. Zabihullah Mujahid told CBS News that "On the one hand they say a million children will die, but on the other, the U.S. are holding our money. The U.S. should release our money so we can save more children."

=== In the Taliban government since 2021 ===
On 7 September 2021, Mujahid was appointed Deputy Minister of Information and Culture in the newly formed interim government made up entirely of Taliban members.

In April 2023, Supreme Leader Hibatullah Akhundzada relocated Mujahid from Kabul to Kandahar, where Akhundzada resides. Akhundzada has been relocating officials closer to himself in order to tighten his grip on power. Mujahid said his move was a pragmatic decision to allow him to more easily report on Akhundzada's activities, and denied the move is reflective of a power shift.

== See also ==
- Tariq Ghazniwal – another IEA spokesperson
- Abdul Qahar Balkhi – IEA Spokesperson for Minister of Foreign Affairs
