= List of ambassadors of Afghanistan to China =

Coordinates: 39.939175°N 116.451817°E

Ambassador of the Islamic Emirate of Afghanistan to the People's Republic of China
- Flag of Afghanistan
- Incumbent; Bilal Karimi since 1 December 2023
- Seat: Beijing
- Appointer: Foreign Minister
- Inaugural holder: Habibullah Khan Tarzi
- Formation: 1946
- Website: Embassy Twitter

The ambassador of Afghanistan to China is the official representative of the Islamic Emirate of Afghanistan to the People's Republic of China.

== List of representatives ==
| Diplomatic agrément/Diplomatic accreditation | Ambassador | Observations | Afghan head of state | Chinese head of state | Term end |
|---|---|---|---|---|---|
| 1946 | Habibullah Khan Tarzi | | Mohammed Zahir Shah | Chiang Kai-shek | 1946 |
| 1956 | Abdul Samad (Afghan envoy) | | Mohammed Zahir Shah | Mao Zedong | 1962 |
| 1962 | Mohamed Shoeb Misskinyar | | Mohammed Zahir Shah | Liu Shaoqi | 1966 |
| 1966 | Mohammad Assef Sohail | | Mohammed Zahir Shah | Liu Shaoqi | 1970 |
| 1970 | Mohammad Osman Sidky | | Mohammed Zahir Shah | Soong Ching-ling and Dong Biwu (acting) | 1973 |
| January 10, 1974 | Mir Mohammad Youssof | | Mohammed Zahir Shah | Dong Biwu (acting) | 1976 |
| 1977 | Mohammad Yassin Azim | | Mohammed Zahir Shah | Soong Ching-ling (acting) | 1979 |
| 2003 | Qiamuddin Rai Barlas | | Hamid Karzai | Hu Jintao | November 4, 2005 |
| December 28, 2005 | Eklil Ahmad Hakimi | | Hamid Karzai | Hu Jintao | March 18, 2009 |
| November 22, 2009 | Sultan Ahmad Baheen | | Hamid Karzai | Hu Jintao | |
| June 8, 2015 | Mohammad Kabir Farahi | | Ashraf Ghani | Xi Jinping | |
| February 2016 | Janan Mosazai | | Ashraf Ghani | Xi Jinping | September 2018 |
| November 26, 2019 | Javid Ahmad Qaem | | Ashraf Ghani | Xi Jinping | January 2, 2022 |
| April 4, 2022 | Muhayuddin Sadaat | Chargé d'Affaires | Hibatullah Akhundzada | Xi Jinping | December 1, 2023 |
| December 1, 2023 | Bilal Karimi | First Taliban-appointed ambassador to receive accreditation. | Hibatullah Akhundzada | Xi Jinping | Incumbent |
