= Bilal Karimi =

Deputy Central Spokesperson of Afghanistan

Maulvi Bilal Karimi بلال کریمی

Afghan Ambassador to China
- Incumbent
- Assumed office 1 December 2023
- Supreme Leader: Hibatullah Akhundzada
- Foreign Minister: Amir Khan Muttaqi
- Preceded by: Javid Ahmad Qaem

Deputy Central Spokesman of the Islamic Emirate of Afghanistan
- In office 25 October 2021 – 2023 Serving with Ahmadullah Wasiq; Inamullah Samangani
- Central Spokesman: Zabihullah Mujahid

Maulvi Asadullah, also known as Bilal Karimi (Pashto: بلال کریمی), is an Afghan diplomat and politician, who has been serving as the Afghan Ambassador to China since 1 December 2023.

== Career ==
Karimi previously served as an official Deputy Central spokesman for the Islamic Emirate of Afghanistan from 25 October 2021 to 2023, alongside Ahmadullah Wasiq and Inamullah Samangani. He is also a member of the Taliban Cultural Commission.

He was appointed as Afghanistan's ambassador to China on 1 December 2023. He presented his credentials to Chinese President Xi Jinping on 30 January 2024, making China the first country to accept credentials from an ambassador of the Islamic Emirate of Afghanistan.
