= Politics of the Islamic Republic of Afghanistan =

Politics of the former 2004–2021 Afghan Republic

The government of Afghanistan is currently disputed following the effective collapse of the Islamic Republic of Afghanistan during the fall of Kabul to Taliban forces on 15 August 2021 and the subsequent re-establishment of the Islamic Emirate of Afghanistan which now exercises de facto control over most of the country. On 7 September 2021 the Taliban officials in de facto control of most of Afghanistan announced a new interim government headed by Mullah Mohammad Hassan Akhund as Prime Minister. The government is subject to the oversight of the Taliban's Supreme Leader, Haibatullah Akhundzada. As of 8 September 2021, the Islamic Emirate of Afghanistan has not yet been formally recognized as the de jure government of Afghanistan by any other country. The representatives appointed by the Islamic Republic of Afghanistan continue to represent the country at the United Nations. These representatives have refused to recognize the Taliban appointed government and have urged other countries to not recognize this government either.

Between 2002 and 2021, the government of Afghanistan consisted of the cabinet of ministers, provincial governors and the national assembly, with a president serving as the head of state, head of government and commander-in-chief of the Afghan Armed Forces. The nation was formerly led by President Ashraf Ghani who was backed by two vice presidents, Amrullah Saleh and Sarwar Danish until Ghani fled to the United Arab Emirates (UAE) in August 2021 due to Taliban fighters reaching the capital Kabul, which established a de facto government. In the last decade the politics of Afghanistan have been influenced by NATO countries, particularly the United States, in an effort to stabilise and democratise the country. In 2004, the nation's new constitution was adopted and an executive president was elected. The following year a general election to choose parliamentarians took place.

Hamid Karzai was declared the first-ever democratically elected head of state in Afghanistan in 2004, winning a second five-year term in 2009. The National Assembly was Afghanistan's national legislature. It was a bicameral body, composed of the House of the People and the House of Elders. The first legislature was elected in 2005 and the most recent one in 2018. Members of the Supreme Court were appointed by the president to form the judiciary. Together, this system served to provide a set of checks and balances.

== History ==
=== Background ===
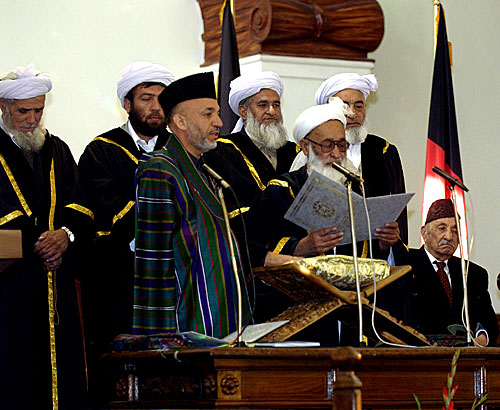
Hamid Karzai standing next to Faisal Ahmad Shinwari and others after winning the 2004 presidential election. The last king of Afghanistan, Zahir Shah is sitting at the right.

Afghanistan was an Islamic republic consisting of three branches of power (executive, legislative, and judiciary) overseen by checks and balances. The country was led by President Ashraf Ghani, who replaced Hamid Karzai in 2014. Before the election of 2004, Karzai led the country after being appointed as President of the Afghan Transitional Administration. While supporters have praised Karzai's efforts to promote national reconciliation and a growing economy, critics charge him with failing to stem corruption and the illegal drug production.

The National Assembly was elected in 2005 and then in 2010. Among the elected officials were former mujahideen, Islamic fundamentalists, reformists, communists, and several Taliban associates. About 28% of the delegates elected were women, 3% more than the 25% minimum guaranteed under the constitution. This made Afghanistan one of the leading countries in terms of female representation in the legislature.

The Supreme Court of Afghanistan was led by Chief Justice Sayed Yusuf Halem, replacing Abdul Salam Azimi in 2014. The Deputy Chief Justice was Bahauddin Baha.

=== Northern Alliance and Taliban government ===
In September 1996, officials of the Islamic State of Afghanistan under Burhanuddin Rabbani were displaced by forces of the Taliban. The United Nations refused to recognize the Taliban government, instead it recognized the Islamic State as the official government in exile. The Organisation of the Islamic Conference left the Afghan seat vacant until the question of legitimacy could be resolved through negotiations among the warring factions. The Taliban controlled 95% of the territory by 2001 and only Pakistan, Saudi Arabia, and the United Arab Emirates recognized them as the government of Afghanistan. The remaining 5% belonged to rebel forces that became known as the Northern Alliance.

=== Military action by the United States and allies ===
After the Taliban's refusal to hand over Osama bin Laden to U.S. authorities for his involvement in the September 11 terrorist attacks against the United States, a US-led international coalition was formed; after several weeks of aerial bombardment by coalition forces and military action on the ground, including operations with the Northern Alliance, the Taliban was officially ousted from power on December 17, 2001.

=== Bonn Agreement ===
In December 2001, a number of prominent Afghans met under the United Nations auspices in Germany to decide on a plan for governing the country. As a result, the Afghan Interim Administration (AIA) – made up of 30 members, headed by a chairman – was inaugurated on December 22, 2001, with a six-month mandate to be followed by a two-year Afghan Transitional Administration (ATA), after which elections are to be held. Some provisions in the agreement have expired, due to the creation of the constitution. Still, the agreement paved the way for the creation of a democratic Afghanistan.

=== ISAF and Afghan security forces ===
The United Nations Security Council authorized the creation of the International Security Assistance Force (ISAF) to help provide basic security for the population of Afghanistan. Members of the United States Armed Forces and other NATO countries began sending large number of troops to Afghanistan. They began to train the Afghan Armed Forces and Afghan National Police as well as fight insurgents and take part in the reconstruction of Afghanistan.

=== New constitution and national elections ===
The structure of the Transitional Authority was announced on June 10, 2002, when an emergency loya jirga (grand assembly) convened establishing the Transitional Islamic State of Afghanistan (TISA), which had 18 months to hold a constitutional loya jirga to adopt a constitution and 24 months to hold nationwide elections. The loya jirga was replaced by the National Assembly.

Under the Bonn Agreement, the Afghan Constitution Commission was established to consult with the public and formulate a draft constitution. The meeting of a constitutional loya jirga was held in December 2003, when a new constitution was adopted creating a presidential form of government with a bicameral legislature: the House of Elders (Meshrano Jirga) and the House of the People (Wolesi Jirga).

The 2004 presidential election was held on October 9, with over 10 million Afghans being registered to vote. Many of the candidates running against Hamid Karzai tried to boycott the election because they feared irregularities. However, Karzai made this statement to the media:

"It is too late to call for a boycott now that millions of Afghans have come from their homes despite rain and snow and they have voted... We should respect the people's will. I'm very delighted that all over Afghanistan, with the help of God, people with a lot of happiness and enthusiasm went to ballot boxes and voted. This shows the political understanding of Afghans and their will for a peaceful future."

— Hamid Karzai, October 9, 2004

An independent commission found evidence of fraud, but ruled that it did not affect the outcome of the poll and Karzai won with 55.4% of the vote. He was inaugurated as President on December 7 of that year. It was the country's first national election since 1969, when parliamentary elections were last held.

In September 2005, the parliamentary election was held; the National Assembly opened after the results were announced. In December 2005, Sibghatullah Mojadeddi was picked to head the 102-seat upper house and Yunus Qanuni was chosen to lead the 249-seat lower house of parliament.

== Executive branch ==
The constitution of Afghanistan created a strong presidency, serving as the head of state and Commander-in-Chief of the Afghan Armed Forces. The president was elected with two vice-presidents. As the Islamic Republic of Afghanistan was a unitary state, the president appointed cabinet ministers and provincial governors, which are to be approved by the National Assembly.

=== Presidency of Hamid Karzai ===
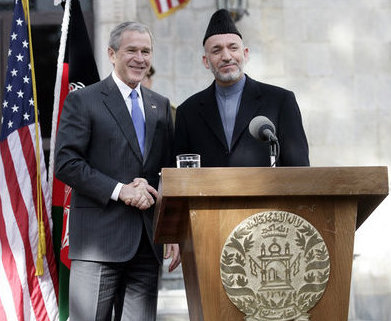
Then-U.S. President George W. Bush with Hamid Karzai in Kabul on March 1, 2006. United States-Afghanistan relations have improved since late 2001, especially after the Karzai administration was formed.

Hamid Karzai served as the Chairman of the Interim Administration from December 2001 to June 2002. He then served as the Interim President between June 2002 to October 2004. He officially became the President of the Islamic Republic of Afghanistan after winning the 2004 presidential election.

==== First term ====
The United States is the leading nation in the rebuilding and democratization of Afghanistan. United States-Afghanistan relations have improved since late 2001, especially after the Karzai administration was formed. Foreign relations of Afghanistan with other NATO members and regional countries have also improved under the Karzai administration.

After winning the 2004 election and removing many of the former Northern Alliance warlords from his cabinet, it was thought that Karzai would pursue a more aggressively reformist path in 2005 but he proved to be more cautious. Ever since Karzai's new administration took over in 2004, the economy of Afghanistan has been growing rapidly for the first time in many years. Government revenue is increasing every year, although it is still heavily dependent on foreign aid. During the Karzai administration, public discontent grew about corruption and the civilian casualties in the fight against the Taliban insurgency.

==== Second term ====
Three months after the 2009 election, President Karzai was officially declared the winner. The Obama administration urged Karzai to exclude ineffective or corrupt officials from the new government, while powerful Afghans who helped deliver his re-election were demanding positions. According to political analysts, the list of ministers Karzai presented to the Parliament was "not encouraging", but it reflected realpolitik. Slightly more than half were ministers who would stay in their current positions or who had served previously in Karzai's government. In January 2009, the Afghan Parliament rejected 17 of Karzai's 24 cabinet nominees, approving only seven. Relations between US President Barack Obama and Karzai were not so great in the beginning but by 2012 they slightly improved, especially after the death of Osama bin Laden and the assassination of Karzai's brother, Ahmed Wali Karzai. President Obama made two official visits to Afghanistan between 2010 and 2012. The relations again began to decline in late 2013 after Karzai decided not to sign the Bilateral Security Agreement (BSA) with the United States.

=== Presidency of Ashraf Ghani ===
After a disputed election, Ashraf Ghani became President of Afghanistan and Abdullah Abdullah became Chief Executive Officer of Afghanistan in September 2014. One day later, the new Afghan government signed the Bilateral Security Agreement.

On August 15, 2021, during the 2021 Taliban offensive, as the Fall of Kabul was occurring, Ashraf Ghani left Afghanistan with his wife to Abu Dhabi in the UAE. Some unconfirmed reports suggest that Ghani may return to Kabul in the future.

== Legislative branch ==
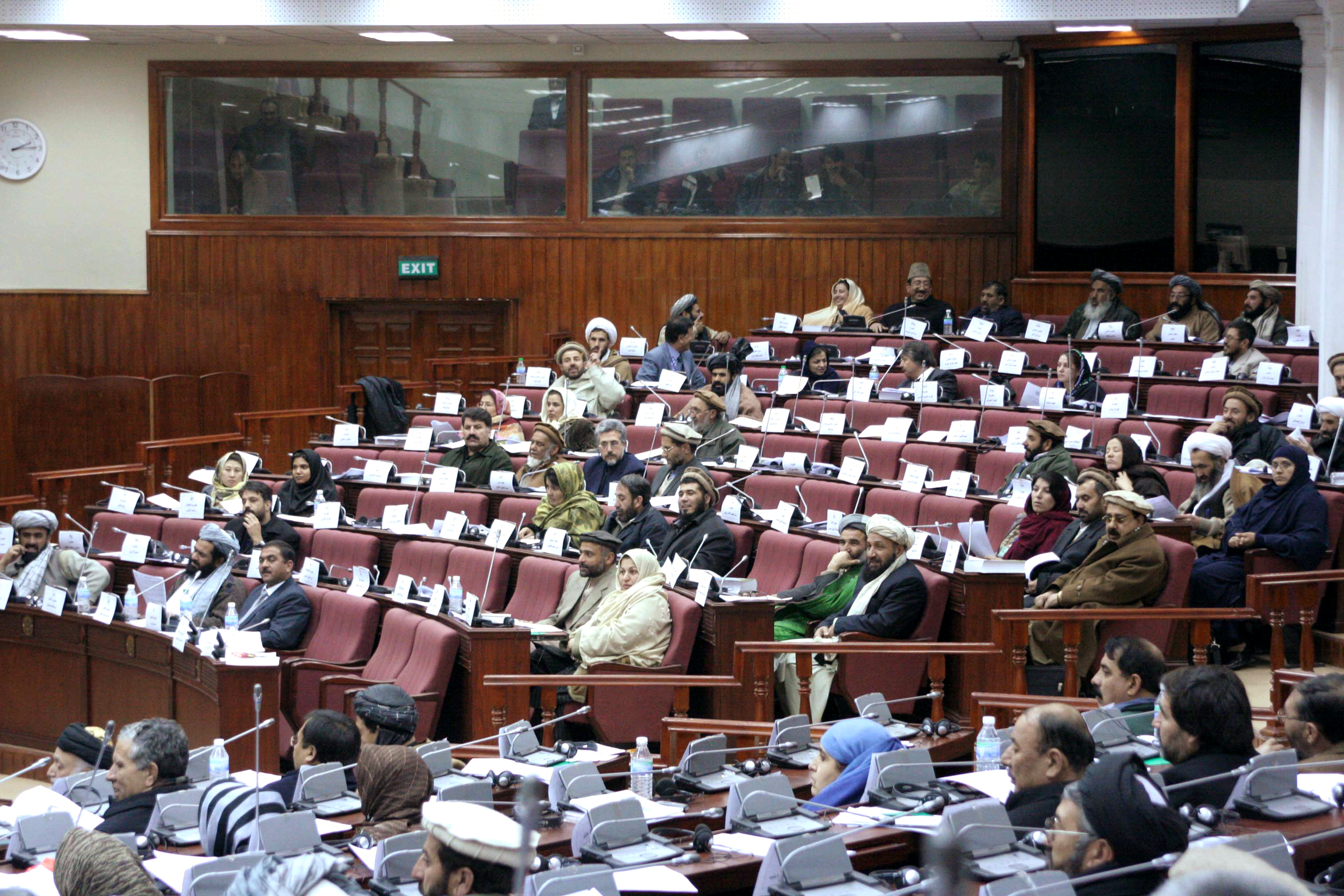
Inside the old building housing the Afghan Parliament (2006)

The 2005 parliamentary election for the Wolesi Jirga (House of the People) were conducted on September 18, 2005. This was the first parliamentary election in Afghanistan since 1969. Approximately 2,707 candidates, including 328 women, competed for 249 seats. The election was conducted with multiple seat electoral constituencies. Each province is a constituency and has a varying number of seats, depending on population. Voters have a single non-transferable vote.

The Meshrano Jirga (House of Elders) consists of 102 members. One-third of the members were appointed by the president, while another third was elected by the provincial councils. Elections for the provincial councils were held simultaneously with those for the Wolesi Jirga. The remaining third are to be elected by district councils.

== Elections ==
=== 2004 presidential ===
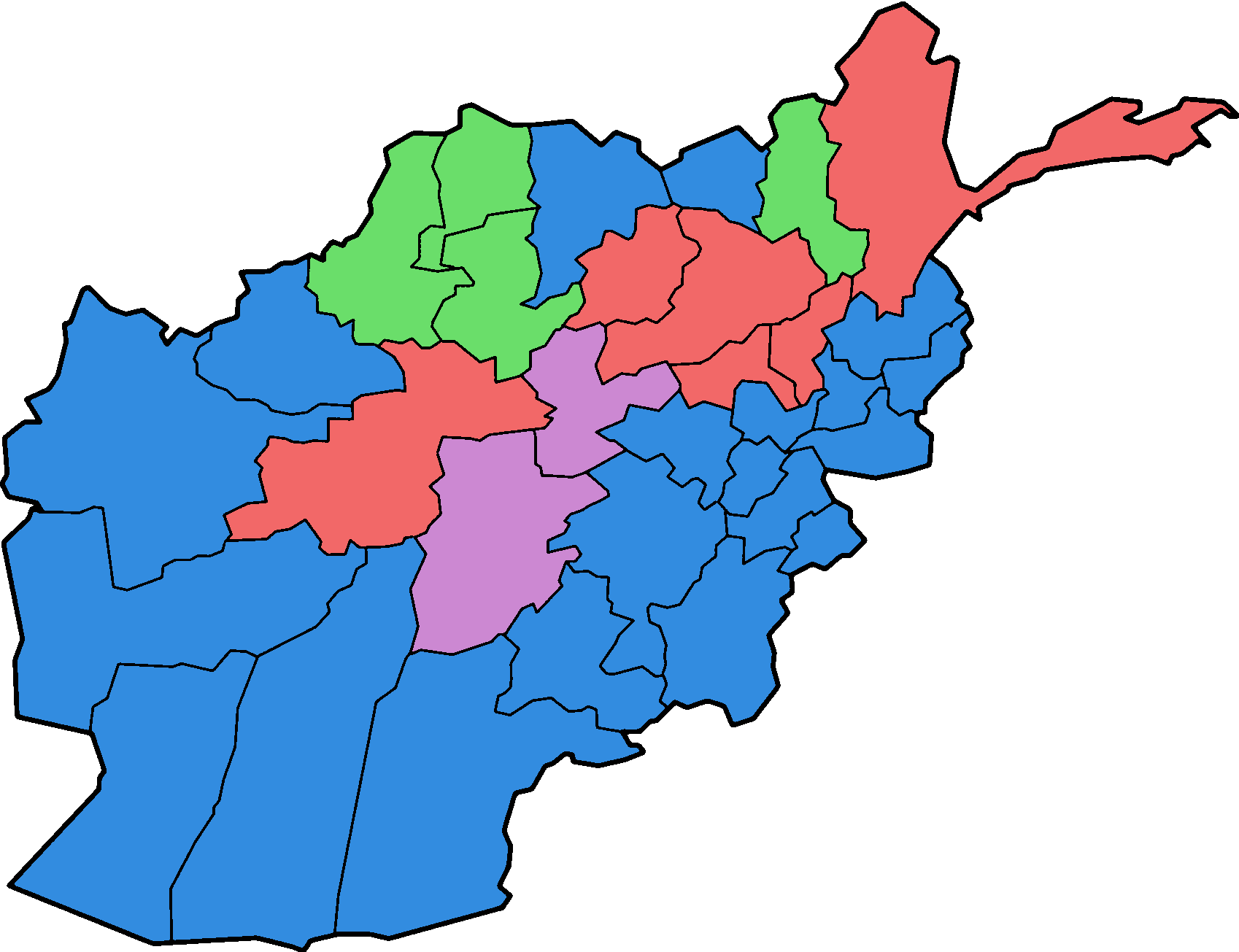
Hamid Karzai won the 2004 presidential election in the first run by receiving 55.4% of the total votes

The first presidential election under the new constitution was held on October 9, 2004. Interim-president Karzai had enough votes to avoid a run-off.

=== 2005 parliamentary ===
Afghanistan held parliamentary elections on 18 September 2005. First results were announced on 9 October and final results on 12 November 2005. Since all candidates were not listed by party and elected as non-partisans, a breakdown by party was not possible. Turnout was estimated at 50 percent.

=== 2009 presidential ===
The 2009 presidential election was characterized by lack of security, low voter turnout and widespread ballot stuffing, intimidation, and other electoral fraud.

The vote, along with elections for 420 provincial council seats, took place on August 20, 2009, but remained unresolved during a lengthy period of vote counting and fraud investigation.

Two months later, under heavy U.S. and ally pressure, a second round run-off vote between incumbent President Hamid Karzai and his main rival Abdullah Abdullah was announced for November 7, 2009. On November 1, however, Abdullah announced that he would no longer be participating in the run-off because his demands for changes in the electoral commission had not been met, and a "transparent election is not possible." A day later, on November 2, 2009, officials of the election commission canceled the run-off and declared Hamid Karzai as President of Afghanistan for another 5-year term.

=== 2014 presidential ===
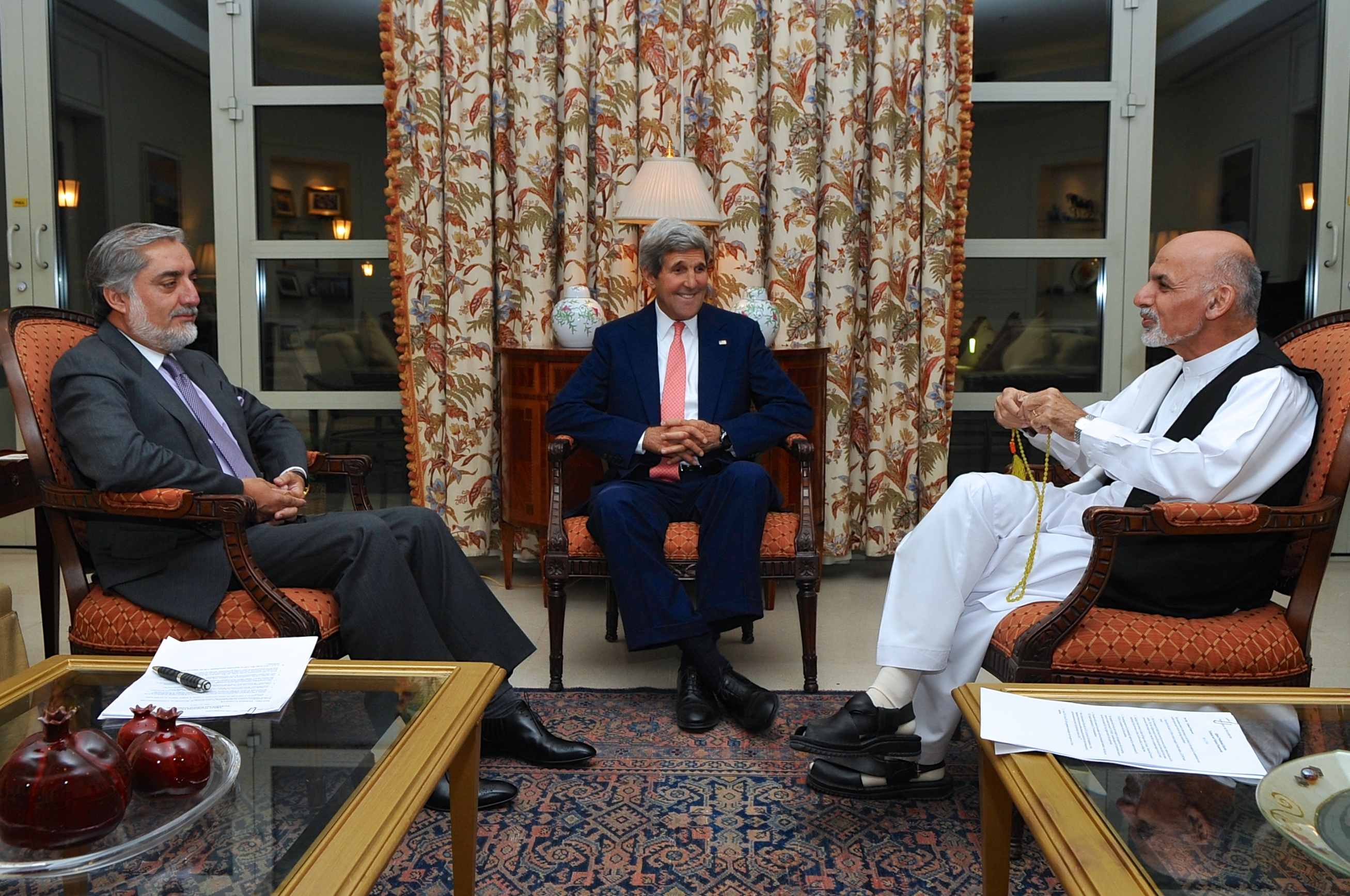
U.S. Secretary of State John Kerry sits with Afghan presidential candidates Abdullah Abdullah, left, and Ashraf Ghani, right, at the U.S. Embassy in Kabul, Afghanistan on July 12, 2014, after he helped broker an agreement on a technical and political plan to resolve the disputed outcome of the election between them.

The 2014 presidential election was held in April 2014, followed by a run-off in June 2014. The results of both ballots were challenged by the losing candidate Abdullah Abdullah, who claimed the results were manipulated to ensure his opponent Ashraf Ghani was declared the winner. The results of the election remained in dispute until September 2014, despite a proposal by the United States that the candidates agree to a power-sharing deal, which was initially agreed to. A UN-led audit failed to sway Abdullah as he insisted the audit team could not explain a million extra votes counted in the run-off. Ghani supporters insisted they wanted to do a deal and were leaving the door open to negotiations.

=== 2019 presidential ===
The 2019 presidential election was held on September 2, 2019, with Ashraf Ghani narrowly reelected over Abdullah Abdullah who contested the preliminary results. When the final results were released in February 2020, Abdullah rejected them, forming a parallel government and organising a separate inauguration. Nonetheless, Ghani was officially sworn in on March 9, 2020. The dispute was resolved on May 16, 2020, when the two signed a power-sharing deal whereby Ghani remained president, however both would choose an equal number of ministers and Abdullah would lead peace talks with the Taliban.

== Judicial branch ==
The constitution of Afghanistan mandates a Supreme Court. The Supreme Court is the highest judicial authority in Afghanistan and is the court of last resort. Judges are appointed by the President and confirmed by the National Assembly. Lower courts included magistrate courts, Courts of First Instance, and the Intermediate Court of Appeals. Intermediate Court of Appeals review decisions of lower courts, before appeals are sent to the Supreme Court. If an appeal loses, they can be sent to the Supreme Court. Courts of First Instance exist in every city. They have several branches that try all major cases. The branches include Criminal, Civil, Religious, Administrative, Labor, and Family divisions. Also in the first instance include military courts, which try military personnel. Magistrate Courts are at the lowest level, which tries minor civil and criminal cases.

== Political parties ==
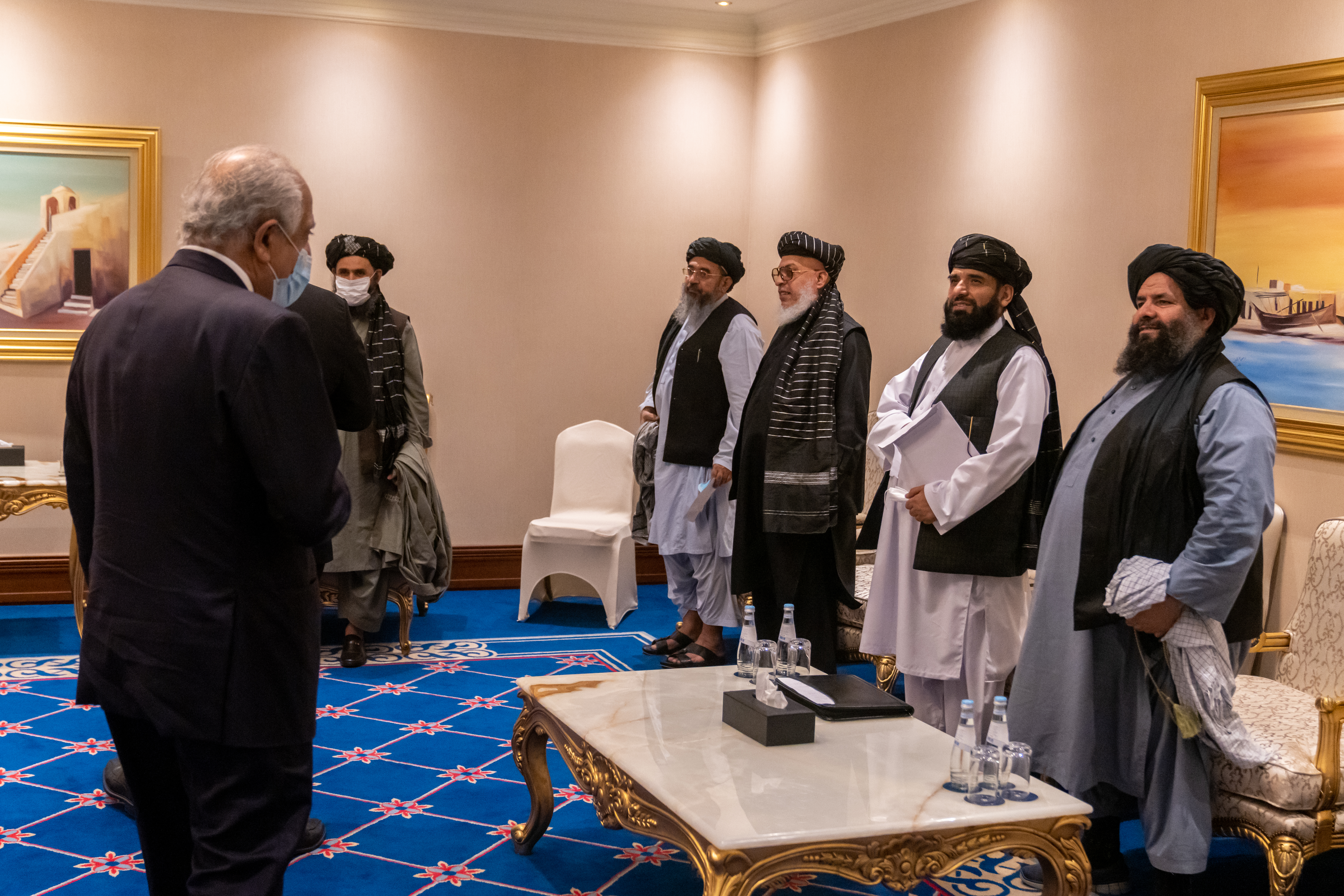
Zalmay Khalilzad meeting Abdul Ghani Baradar, Abdul Hakim Ishaqzai, Sher Mohammad Abbas Stanikzai, Suhail Shaheen and another Taliban member in Doha, Qatar.

Political parties in Afghanistan are in flux and many prominent players have plans to create new ones. Some of the political parties in Afghanistan are as follow:

- Afghan Social Democratic Party (Afghan Mellat)
- Hezbi Islami
- Jamiat-e Islami
- National Islamic Front (Hezb-e-Mahaz-e-Mili Islami)
- Islamic Dawah Organization (Tanzim Dawat-e-Islami)
- National Movement of Afghanistan (Hezb-e-Nuhzhat-e-Mili Afghanistan)
- National Solidarity Movement (Hezb-e-Nahzat-e-Hambastagee Mili)
- National Islamic Unity Party (Hezb-e-Wahdat-e-Mili Islami)
- National Solidarity Party (Hezb-e-Paiwand Mili)
- Islamic Movement of Afghanistan (Harakat-e Islami-yi Afghanistan)
- National Congress Party (Hezb-e-Congra-e-Mili Afghanistan)

== International organization participation ==
Afghanistan is a member of the following organizations:

- Shanghai Cooperation Organisation (observer)
- South Asian Association for Regional Cooperation (SAARC)
- Colombo Plan
- Organisation of Islamic Cooperation (OIC)
- Economic Cooperation Organization (ECO)
- Group of 77
- World Bank
- Asian Development Bank (ADB)
- International Monetary Fund (IMF)
- United Nations Economic and Social Commission for Asia and the Pacific
- Islamic Development Bank (IDB)
- Food and Agriculture Organization
- International Fund for Agricultural Development
- International Atomic Energy Agency (IAEA)
- International Civil Aviation Organization
- International Criminal Court (ICC)
- International Red Cross and Red Crescent Movement
- International Federation of Red Cross and Red Crescent Societies
- International Centre for Settlement of Investment Disputes
- International Finance Corporation
- International Labour Organization
- International Union of Railways
- Interpol
- International Olympic Committee
- International Organization for Migration
- International Telecommunication Union
- Non-Aligned Movement
- Organisation for the Prohibition of Chemical Weapons
- United Nations (UN)
- United Nations Conference on Trade and Development
- United Nations Development Programme (UNDP)
- United Nations Industrial Development Organization
- Universal Postal Union
- World Federation of Trade Unions
- World Health Organization
- World Meteorological Organization
- World Tourism Organization
- World Trade Organization (WTO) (initially observer, became member December 2015)

== See also ==
- List of heads of state of Afghanistan
- Politics of Afghanistan
- Corruption in Afghanistan
