= Sheikh Abdul Malik =

Deputy Chief Justice of the Supreme Court of Afghanistan

- شیخ مولوي عبدالمالک

Second Deputy Chief Justice of the Supreme Court
- Incumbent
- Assumed office 28 October 2021 Serving with Qasim Rasikh
- Prime Minister: Hasan Akhund (acting)
- Chief Justice: Abdul Hakim Haqqani
- Supreme Leader: Hibatullah Akhundzada

Personal details
- Born: Afghanistan
- Profession: Islamic scholar, judge

Sheikh Abdul Malik (شیخ عبدالمالک) is an Afghan Taliban leader and Islamic scholar. He is currently the Second Deputy Chief Justice of the Supreme Court of the Islamic Emirate of Afghanistan alongside Qasim Rasikh since 28 October 2021.
