= The Islamic Emirate and its System =

Book and manifesto published by Abdul Haqim Ishaqzai

- Author: Abdul Hakim Ishaqzai
- Language: Arabic
- Subject: Islamic state
- Publisher: Darul Uloom al-Sharia
- Publication date: April 2022
- Publication place: Afghanistan
- Pages: 312

The Islamic Emirate and its System (Arabic: الإمارة الإسلامية ومنظومتها, al-Imarat al-Islamiat wa-Manzumatuha) is a book and manifesto published by Abdul Haqim Ishaqzai, the Chief Justice of the Islamic Emirate of Afghanistan. The book is a manifesto of the Islamic Movement of Taliban describing how to establish and run an Islamic Emirate.

However there is dispute if this book represents the political views of the Taliban as a whole or the Kandahari Taliban.

== Authorship, review and publishing ==
Chief Justice Abdul Hakim Ishaqzai was the author, having his book reviewed by Haibatullah Akhundzada, the Leader of the Islamic Emirate of Afghanistan. The book was also reviewed by a numerous individuals from the ulema who subsequently endorsed the work. Askundzada endorsed the work as well.

The book was published by Darul Uloom al-Sharia in Arabic. The use of Arabic was meant to allow the book to be read by a wider range of audiences and be compared more easily to other Islamic works.

== Content ==
The book is 312 pages and contains content including areas concerning governance, the rights and roles of women, jihad, political leadership and administration, and types of education.

=== Goal of the Islamic Movement of Taliban ===
The book states that the goal of the Islamic Movement of Taliban is the formation of an Islamic state after the withdraw of occupying forces. He states that the goal of such a state is to be governed by Sharia as informed by the Hanafi jurisprudence.

=== Role of the armed forces and Islamic Emirate ===
The book explains that the first priority of the armed forces is to carry out Allah's divine will. It explains that its second priority is to protect the Islamic Emirate and ummah's assets and territory. This includes madrassas, private property, public property, mosques, and the borders of the ummah. However, jihad is the armed forces foremost duty.

=== Types of government ===
The book divides government in to two types, al-jabayat (levies) and al-hedayat (guidance). The author elaborates that the former system is concerned with enriching those who presided over state institutions, material, and political considerations. It explains that an Islamic state should be governed according to al-hedayat where the poor are not exploited to enrich the state. It says that this form of governance is according to divine, not man-made law. It says that the Islamic Emirate of Afghanistan is governed by the latter system.

The book also defines several elements that make up an Islamic state, which include guidance, and independent judiciary, an Islamic army, and Sharia. It explains that such a state will not succeed without implementing the Quran and Sunnah as understood by the early generations of jurists and Muslims (who are defined as the Mujahideen). It adds that this was the goal of the Islamic Movement of Taliban, and is the people of Afghanistan.

=== Sources of Sharia ===
The book explains that there several sources of Sharia. These sources include, but are not limited to, the Quran, Hadith, Qiyas, Ijma, and khayr.

=== Jurisprudence and justice ===
The book states that the state should follow the madhab as adhered to by the majority of a regions' people. It explains that in Afghanistan, the Hanafi madhab should inform all verdicts within a Sharia court. It explains that there should be no consideration for other madhabs. It adds that those of religious minorities should also be judged according to Sharia law as interpreted by the Hanafi school of jurisprudence. It states that allowing judicial accommodation for religious minorities would destroy the Islamic justice system, citing the court system of the Ottoman Empire.

=== Pashtunwali and local customs ===
The book states that Pashtunwali is important, adding Afghans should dress in traditional Afghan clothing which include the burqa and turban among others. It explains that an Islamic state should observe local customs and cultures when they do not contradict Sharia.

=== Authority of the Amir al-Mu'minin ===
The book states that the head of the Islamic state should be titled as the Amir al-Mu'minin. It explains that obedience to the Amir al-Mu'minin by the ummah is fard and that opposition is hudud. It considers the Amir al-Mu'minin as the embodiment of uli al-amr.

The book also details the flags that should be used by an Islamic state. It states that the Islamic state should have its liwa (national flag) in plain white, while the raya (administrative subdivisional flags) in plain black. These flags would be equivalent to the rayat al-uqab and rayat al-sawdah (Banner of the Young Eagle and Banner of the Eagle) respectively.

=== Appointment of the Amir al-Mu'minin ===
The book explains the Amir al-Mu'minin should be appointed in the same method of the Rashidun Caliphs. It says that the Amir should be appointed by the Ahl al-Ḥall wa'l-‘Aḳd. It adds the officeholder should be a man and that women should stay at home and avoid political participation, believing it will destroy the political administration.

=== Political institutions ===
The book discusses the role of the institutions of the Islamic Emirate including the ministries of the Council of Ministers, the Armed Forces of the Islamic Emirate of Afghanistan, and the Judiciary of the Islamic Emirate. It adds that a legislative body known as the Islamic Council should be formed consisting of male legislators, among other conditions for participation.

=== Education ===
The book says the education system must be done in a madrassa, stating that non-Islamic education weakens Muslims. It states that many of Afghanistan's current problems are due to non-Islamic education. It explains that madrassa education should be mandatory while non-Islamic education should be optional. The book adds that the co-educational system is haram and is against Ghairat-e-Afghani.

=== Women's education and career ===
The book states that education of women is not haram, but that the curriculum must be compliant with Sharia to prevent moral corruption. It explains that women must be home-schooled by family members in subjects and pursue careers that they are deemed appropriate for them. This includes anything in the domestic sphere such as child rearing, elderly care, embroidery, or home sciences among others.

The book continues adding that women should work in careers they are most suited for which include medicine (treating other women) and teaching (only girls). It states that women must be fully covered in the hijab, and should not pursue careers or education where they will be alone longer than three days. The book states women cannot hold senior leadership positions. It adds that women should not travel long distances without a mahram, and that the should not unnecessarily leave their residence.

== Role in the Islamic Movement of Taliban ==
The book is claimed to be a manifesto giving a political grounding for the Taliban's policies and governance, but there is dispute if the book is reflective of the entire Islamic Movement of Taliban. The book was written by Chief Justice Abdul Hakim Ishaqzai, and peer reviewed by Taliban leader Haibatullah Akhundzada.

== Criticism ==
The book has come under academic criticism for its lack of clarity, historical inaccuracy, and impracticality with the certain concepts it promotes. The book has been criticized for failing to list any sources for its content. Dr. Osman Muhammad Bakash has also criticized the manifesto for its ambiguity in different areas of its content. He cited that there are no provisions of jihad, lack of legal justification for Sharia being restricted to Afghanistan, that non-Muslim citizens are placed under the international relations chapter among others. He also points out how the author explains the theoretical need for a caliphate without discussing the obstacles and impracticality in reestablishing one.
