= International Criminal Court investigation in Afghanistan =

Situation in Afghanistan
- The seal of the International Criminal Court
- File no.: 02/17
- Date opened: 5 March 2020
- Incident(s): War in Afghanistan (2001–2021); Treatment of women by the Taliban
- Crimes: Crimes against humanity: · Gender persecution

Status of suspects
- Hibatullah Akhundzada: Fugitive
- Abdul Hakim Haqqani: Fugitive
- Habibullah Agha: Fugitive
- Neda Mohammad Nadeem: Fugitive

The International Criminal Court investigation in Afghanistan or the Situation in Afghanistan is an ongoing investigation by the International Criminal Court (ICC) into war crimes and crimes against humanity that are alleged to have occurred during the war in Afghanistan since 1 May 2003, or in the case of United States Armed Forces and the CIA, war crimes committed in Afghanistan, Poland, Romania or Lithuania. On 5 March 2020, the investigation was authorised to officially begin. Warrants of arrest were requested by the Prosecutor against Hibatullah Akhundzada, Supreme Leader of Afghanistan, and Abdul Hakim Haqqani, Chief Justice of Afghanistan in January 2025. The warrants were issued by Pre-Trial Chamber II on 8 July 2025 for the crime of humanity of persecution on gender grounds under article 7(1)(h) of the Rome Statute and unsealed, along with warrants against Habibullah Agha and Neda Mohammad Nadeem, on 5 October 2026.

The court faced opposition from the United States. In 2020, the Government of Afghanistan requested that the court defer to its own investigation. In 2021, ICC Prosecutor Karim Ahmad Khan said, if authorisation was granted to resume, the investigation would focus on "crimes allegedly committed by the Taliban and the Islamic State – Khorasan Province ("IS-K") and to deprioritise other aspects of this investigation." In October 2022, the prosecution was authorised to resume investigating. In 2026, investigation into the Taliban since 2021 was separated from "all other aspects of the originally authorized investigation." Later in 2026, the court effectively closed the "originally authorized investigation".

== Investigation ==
From 20 November 2017 to 31 January 2018, the ICC collected representations by victims in relation to their claims of crimes against humanity and war crimes committed by the Taliban and affiliated armed groups, war crimes by the Afghan National Security Forces, and war crimes committed in Afghanistan, Poland, Romania and Lithuania by United States Armed Forces and the United States Central Intelligence Agency (CIA). Information about allegations of crimes committed by other international military forces in Afghanistan was also sought.

In 2019, the request by Fatou Bensouda, the ICC chief prosecutor, to open an investigation was rejected at the pretrial level on the grounds that the chance of a successful prosecution was low, much time had passed, Afghan and US authorities were uncooperative, and the investigation wouldn't "serve the interests of justice". On 5 March 2020, after an appeal against the decision, the investigation was authorised to proceed. Judge Piotr Hofmański stated that the court has jurisdiction, since Afghanistan is party to the Rome Statute, and that the preliminary examination showed "reasonable grounds to believe that war crimes had been committed in Afghanistan".

== Reactions ==
In April 2019, the United States (US) cancelled Bensouda's visa in response to the ICC investigation in Afghanistan, on the grounds that the US does not wish claims of war crimes by US military personnel to be investigated by the ICC.

On 11 June 2020, US Secretary of State Mike Pompeo announced the signing of Executive Order 13928 by US President Donald Trump, establishing economic sanctions and visa travel restrictions against ICC lawyers and investigators as well as journalists providing evidence of war crimes by US citizens and military troops. Pompeo claimed that the ICC is a kangaroo court.

On 2 September 2020, Bensouda and Phakiso Mochochoko, Head of the Jurisdiction, Complementarity and Cooperation Division of the ICC, had sanctions imposed on them by the United States in response to the ICC investigation in Afghanistan. Richard Dicker of Human Rights Watch criticised the imposition of sanctions, stating that they "[mark] a stunning perversion of US sanctions, devised to penalize rights abusers and kleptocrats, to persecute those tasked with prosecuting international crimes".

== Arrest warrants ==
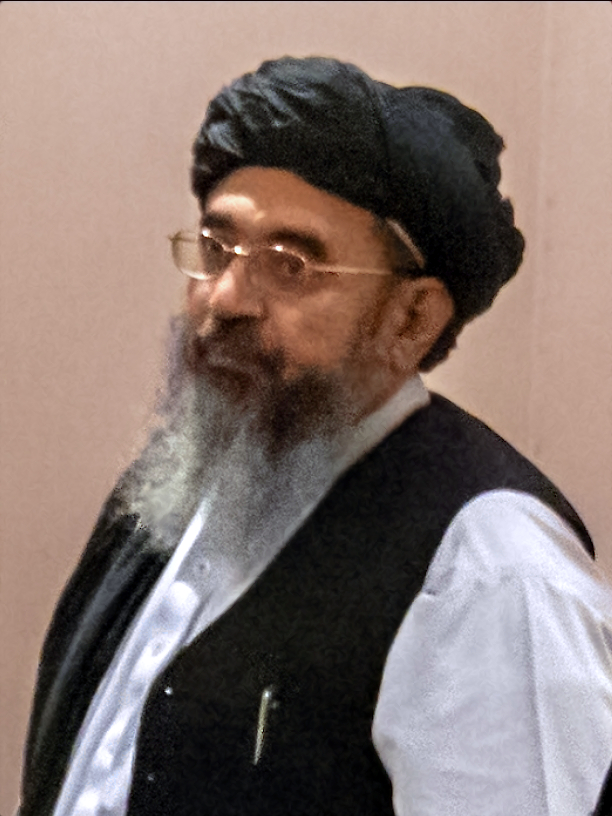
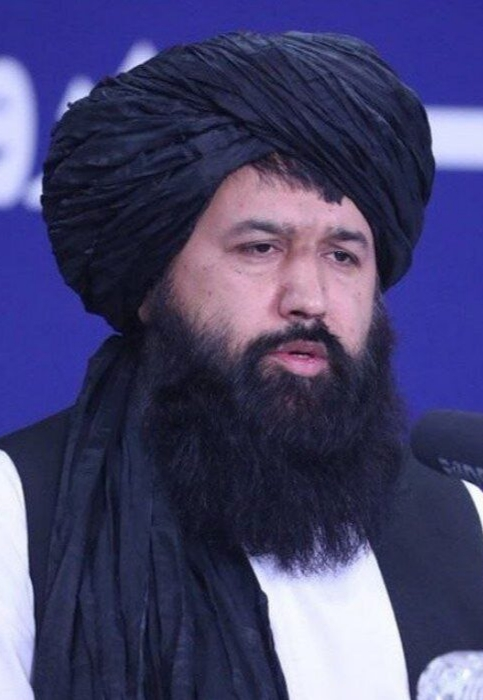
People for whom arrest warrants were unsealed on 5 October 2026 in the ICC investigation in Aghanistan. Abdul Hakim Haqqani (left), Neda Mohammad Nadeem (right). Hibatullah Akhundzada and Habibullah Agha are not pictured.

On 23 January 2025, ICC Prosecutor Karim Khan announced that his office had filed two requests for arrest warrants for two senior Taliban officials, namely the Supreme Leader of the organization Hibatullah Akhundzada, and the Chief Justice of Afghanistan Abdul Hakim Haqqani. The two are charged with one count of crime against humanity, specifically the crime of persecution on gender grounds as it relates to the Taliban's policies towards women and girls, as well as members of the Afghan LGBTQI+ community. Per the prosecutor's statement, his office believes that there are reasonable grounds to believe that both Hibatullah Akhundzada and Abdul Hakim Haqqani "bear individual criminal responsibility" for the alleged crime. On 8 July 2025, Pre-Trial Chamber II issued the arrest warrants.

The ICC unsealed the arrest warrants against Akhundzada and Haqqani, as well as arrest warrants against Habibullah Agha and Neda Mohammad Nadeem, on 5 October 2026.

== See also ==
- Afghan Independent Human Rights Commission
- Afghan Unlawful Killings inquiry
