= Judiciary of Afghanistan =

The judiciary of Afghanistan currently consists of the Supreme Court, appeals courts, civil courts and city courts. All justices of the appeals, civil and city courts are presided over by Chief Justice of the Supreme Court.

Although some individuals received secular judicial training in the early 2000s, the majority of local court officials came from Muslim religious schools and lacked judicial skills. However, the nominal requirements for participation in the judiciary are relatively high, and the pay is quite low. The respective roles of Islamic and secular law in the former judicial system during the Islamic Republic era have not been well established; a large portion of the current law code is based on laws passed under the last king, Mohammad Zahir Shah (ruled 1933–73). In rural areas, where local elders and tribal authorities resolve criminal cases, verdicts often are based on Islamic and tribal law. After returning to power in 2021, the Taliban removed women from judgeships in Afghanistan. The government of Canada agreed to resettle many Afghan women judges.

== Organisation ==
=== Supreme Court ===
The Supreme Court of the Islamic Emirate, or Supreme Court of Afghanistan, is the final court of appeal in Afghanistan. Per Articles 117 and 118 of the Constitution, the chief can be appointed by the president and the house of the people per Articles 117 and 118 of the Constitution. Abdul Hakim Ishaqzai, who is Minister of Justice, currently presides over the court as Chief Justice. Beneath him are two deputy justices; Mohammad Qasim Rasikh and Sheikh Abdul Malik.

=== Court of Appeals ===
The Court of Appeals are the court of second instance at the provincial level. Each court is currently presided over by a chief Justice appointed by the Supreme Court. The heads of Dewans and additional judicial members can also serve in this court, in accordance with Article 31.

=== Civil Courts ===
Civil Courts operate at the provincial level in seven provinces of Afghanistan as a civil court of first instance, operating on the same level of the provincial Court of Appeals. As its name implies civil cases currently are handled at this level in their respective province. Each civil court is currently presided over by a chief justice appointed by the Supreme Court.Provinces that currently have civil courts as of 2021 are Baghlan, Samangan, Faryab, Sar-I-Pul, Kunar, Maidan Wardak, and Nuristan.

=== City and Municipal Courts ===
City Courts function as the court of first instance at the municipal level across Afghanistan. Each court is currently presided over by a chief justice appointed by the Supreme Court.

=== Prosecution of crimes ===
Under the Taliban, the courts both prosecute and decide the result of criminal cases. Under the Islamic Republic of Afghanistan there was an independent attorney general and system of prosecutors, but the Taliban transferred responsibility for the prosecution of crimes to the courts.

== See also ==
- Law of Afghanistan
- Law enforcement in Afghanistan
- Ministry of Justice (Afghanistan)
- Justice minister
