= Ghulam Ghaus =

Ghulam Ghaus may refer to:

- Ghulam Ghaus (Afghan politician)
- Ghulam Ghaus (Indian politician)
