= Noor Mohammad Saqib =

Minister of Hajj and Awqaf of Afghanistan

Sheikh Noor Mohammad Saqib نور محمد ثاقب

Minister of Hajj and Religious Affairs
- Incumbent
- Assumed office 7 September 2021 (Note: Acting: 7 September 2021 – 15 August 2025)
- Prime Minister: Hasan Akhund
- Supreme Leader: Hibatullah Akhundzada
- Preceded by: Faiz Mohammad Usmani

Chief Justice of the Islamic Emirate of Afghanistan
- In office c. 1996 – c. 2001
- Prime Minister: Mohammad Rabbani
- Supreme Leader: Mullah Omar
- Preceded by: Abdul Satar Sanaie
- Succeeded by: Hibatullah Akhundzada

Personal life
- Education: Darul Uloom Haqqania
- Occupation: Politician, Taliban member

Religious life
- Religion: Islam

Muslim leader
- Teacher: Qazi Hamidullah Khan; Zahid Ur Rashdi

Noor Mohammad Saqib (Pashto: نور محمد ثاقب [nur mʊˈhamad sɑˈqɪb]) is the Minister of Hajj and Awqaf in the Taliban rule in Afghanistan. He has also previously been the chief justice of the Supreme Court during the 1996–2001 Taliban rule of the Islamic Emirate of Afghanistan.

== Education ==
Saqib studied at Darul Uloom Haqqania in Pakistan and had won first positions both in his seminary and in the Federation of Madrassas of Pakistan in the final Hadith examination. A year before the Hadith study, he studied at Madrasa Anwar-ul-Uloom, Central Jamia Masjid, Gujranwala, where he studied Mishkat Shareef and Hidayah from Qazi Hamidullah Khan and Jalalin Sharif from Zahid Ur Rashdi.
