= Qasim Rasikh =

Afghan Taliban leader (born 1971)

Sheikh Mawlawi Qasim Rasikh
- قاسم راسخ
- Rasikh in c. 2020

First Deputy Chief Justice of the Supreme Court of Afghanistan
- Incumbent
- Assumed office 28 October 2021
- Prime Minister: Hasan Akhund (acting)
- Chief Justice: Abdul Hakim Haqqani
- Supreme Leader: Hibatullah Akhundzada

Personal details
- Born: Muhammad Qasim Rasikh Juzjani; 1971 (age 54–55) Anpikal, Juzjan Province Afghanistan
- Profession: Islamic scholar, judge

Muhammad Qasim Rasikh Juzjani (Note: Dari: محمد قاسم راسخ جوزجانی) (born 1971) is an Afghan Taliban leader and Islamic scholar who has served as the First Deputy Chief Justice of the Supreme Court of the Islamic Emirate of Afghanistan since 2021.

He is one of the leading members within the Taliban and is part of the Leadership Council headed by Supreme Leader Hibatullah Akhundzada. Rasikh was also a member of the Taliban negotiation team in their Qatar office.

== Early life and education ==
Qasim Rasikh was born in 1971 to Jumah Nazar in the Anpikal village of the Fayzabad District of Juzjan Province, Afghanistan. He belongs to an ethnic Turkmen family.

He received his primary religious and contemporary education from his home country. He completed the hadith course from Darul Uloom Mazhar ul-Uloom, located in Dagai village in Swabi District of Khyber Pakhtunkhwa, Pakistan.

== Political career ==
Qasim has taught sharia in different religious schools for 15 years and also served as Sheikh-ul-Hadees for ten years. He has also been a member of the Da'wah Wal Irshad Commission of Ministry for the Propagation of Virtue and the Prevention of Vice and its provincial head of Jowzjan Province from 2007 to 2016. From 2016 to 2020 he was the appeal judge of the Taliban military "court" for 20 eastern and northern provinces. He was a member of the Leadership Council and the Taliban negotiating team in Qatar.
