= Phakiso Mochochoko =

International diplomat

Personal details
- Born: Phakiso Mochochoko; 4 September 1957 (age 69) Basutoland (present day Lesotho)
- Education: University of Lesotho
- Profession: Human rights lawyer, diplomat

Phakiso Mochochoko (born 4 September 1957) is a diplomat from Lesotho who helped create the International Criminal Court (ICC). He is Head of the Jurisdiction, Complementarity and Cooperation Division at the ICC since 2011.

== Childhood and education ==
Phakiso Mochochoko, born in 1957, was a cattle herder while he attended school during his childhood in the mountains of Lesotho. He received some Save the Children funding for his school education.

Mochochoko was a good student in high school and graduated in arts in 1982 and in law in 1984 at the University of Lesotho.

== Legal career ==
Mochochoko started a legal career and formally qualified as a lawyer. He was described by his legal partner as having "quiet, firm, but completely unthreatening authority". Mochochoko was interested in human rights law and participated in community projects with children and a research project on the effects of traditional law on women in southern Africa. He was active in teaching law to community groups

Mochochoko moved to South Africa in 1992, shortly before the 1994 South African general election, the first with universal adult suffrage. In 1994, he started representing Lesotho at its United Nations (UN) mission in New York.

Mochochoko has held numerous international diplomatic roles, including Chairman of the Sixth Committee (Legal) of the UN in 1999.

=== International Criminal Court ===
Mochochoko played an important role in helping with negotiations for the creation of the International Criminal Court (ICC). He was one of the vice-chairs in the Rome conference where the Rome Statute of the International Criminal Court was negotiated. Mochochoko was one of the first five people who arrived in The Hague to set up the practical operations of the ICC in 2002.

Mochochoko describes one of his major roles at the ICC as witness protection since evidence from witnesses plays a major role in successful prosecutions. In February 2011, he became the Head of the Jurisdiction, Complementarity and Cooperation Division.

In September 2020, Mochochoko and Fatou Bensouda, chief Prosecutor of the ICC, had sanctions imposed on them by the United States in response to the ICC investigation in Afghanistan. The sanctions were lifted by the Biden administration in April 2021.
