= Qazi Hamidullah Khan =

Pakistani politician

Member of the National Assembly of Pakistan
- In office 16 November 2002 – 2 October 2007
- Constituency: NA-96 Gujranwala-II

Personal life
- Born: 1936 Charsadda, Khyber Pakhtunkhwa, Pakistan
- Died: 18 April 2012 (aged 75–76) Lahore
- Political party: Jamiat Ulema-e-Islam (F)
- Education: Jamia Ashrafia
- Occupation: Islamic scholar Politician

Religious life
- Religion: Islam
- Denomination: Sunni
- Jurisprudence: Hanafi
- Movement: Deobandi

Muslim leader
- Teacher: Muhammad Idris Kandhlawi; Mufti Jameel Ahmad Thanvi
- Students: Mohammed Omar Noor Mohammad Saqib

Qazi Hamidullah Khan (1936 - 18 April 2012) was a Pakistani Islamic scholar and former member of the 12th National Assembly of Pakistan from 16 November 2002 until 10 October 2007.

== Early life and education ==
Khan was born in 1934 in the Charsadda District of North-West Frontier Province. He got his early education from his hometown and then enrolled in Jamia Ashrafia, in Lahore.

== Career ==
Khan was the president and Sheikh-ul-Hadees of Jamia Mazahir Uloom and Jamia Anwar ul Uloom at Gujranwala, as well as khatib at Jamia Masjid Anwaar e Madina. He also served as central Vice Emir of Jamiat Ulema-e-Islam (F).

== Death ==
Khan died on 18 April 2012. He was buried in his native hometown Charsadda after his funeral prayers were offered at Sheranwala Bagh, Gujranwala, on the morning of 19 April 2012.

== See also ==
- List of Deobandis
