= Sayed Noorullah Murad =

Sayed Noorullah Murad (born March 22, 1979) is an Afghan politician, military commander and member of the Afghan cabinet during the presidency of Hamid Karzai. He was born in Kunduz city in the north of Afghanistan. His father Mawlawi Abdul Jalil Faqiri, is a famous religious and social leader of Afghanistan.

Murad has migrated to Pakistan along with his family, after the Soviet invasion on Afghanistan. He has attended various educational institutions in Pakistan and has graduated from the University of Peshawar obtaining a bachelor's degree in Arabic literature and journalism and later a master's degree in international relations.

Despite this; Murad has also obtained a degree equal to a masters in Islamic studies from Wifaqul Madares in Multan Pakistan.

Following his father, Murad joined the Jamiat-e-Islami Party during the jihad. He has started working as special advisor in political and tribal affairs to Ahmad Shah Massoud, (the national hero of Afghanistan) then Afghan minister of defence. He has also worked as chief military commander of the Afghan armed forces in southern zone of Afghanistan fighting against Taliban and has promoted to the rank of Major General in (ANA).

It is worth mentioning that due to some principle discrepancies and differences; Murad was imprisoned for over one year in (Doab jail) Panjshir province) by Ahmad Shah Massoud, then was released in 2001 by intervention of Yunus Qanuni and General Besmillah Muhammadi.

After jail Murad was forced by his father's followers to restart his political activities in the current political arena, so he formed a new liberal Political party (DA NEJAT AFGHANI GHORZANG) Afghan Salvation Movement.

Murad is also chairing an organisation called Interfaith Studies Development Center (ISDC) to modernise, madredize and enlighten religious sector of Afghanistan and bring it to right direction. He has also worked for Afghan Ministry of Education from 2001 to 2004 as general director for international relations and NGO's, and head of the grant management unit (GMU). In 2004 he was promoted to chief secretary of the Independent civil services commission of the Islamic Republic of Afghanistan.

In July 2005 he was assigned as a member of Afghan Federal Cabinet and Deputy Minister for religious affairs and Hajj. In this position he introduced several reforms to the religious sector in Afghanistan which caused appreciations and sometimes opposition from public religious community and government. In September 2009 he resigned from his position as minister due to differences with running the administrative system of the ministry.

After a long break; in March 2020 General Murad was appointed by president of Afghanistan as chief advisor (volunteer) to the Minister of Interior Affairs of the Islamic Republic of Afghanistan.

In August 2020 General Murad was appointed as chairman and general director of the national traffic police authority in the Ministry of Interior Affairs, Islamic republic of Afghanistan. General Murad has introduced several changes and reforms to the traffic system of the country like digitization of the national and international driving licences and vehicle registration. After domination of the Taliban; General Murad was removed from his position as inspector general of Afghanistan's national traffic police authority.
