= Ghulam Ghaus (Afghan politician) =

Afghan politician

Haji Ghulam Ghaus

Deputy Minister of Disaster Management
- Incumbent
- Assumed office 21 September 2021 (Note: Acting: 21 September 2021 – 15 August 2025)
- Emir: Hibatullah Akhundzada
- Prime Minister: Hasan Akhund

Personal details
- Party: Taliban

Haji Ghulam Ghaus is an Afghan politician who has been appointed as the Acting Deputy Minister of Disaster Management on 21 September 2021, and reappointed to the position on a permanent basis on 15 August 2025, with the rest of the cabinet.
