= Afghanistan Ulema gathering =

2022 meeting of Afghan scholars and elders

- Native name: د افغانستان د علماوو لويه غونډه
- Date: June 29 – July 2, 2022
- Venue: Loya Jirga Hall, Kabul, Afghanistan
- Type: Gathering of Afghan scholars and elders
- Organized by: Commission led by Deputy Prime Minister of Afghanistan Mullah Abdul Ghani Baradar, organized by the Taliban
- Participants: About 3,000 people, including clerics and tribal elders
- Outcome: 11-point statement released urging recognition of Taliban-led Afghanistan, removal of all sanctions, and unfreezing of Afghan assets abroad

Afghanistan Ulema gathering (Pashto: د افغانستان د علماوو لويه غونډه) was a three days gathering of the Afghan scholars and elders from 29 June 2022 to 2 July 2022. About 3,000 people from across the country gathered at the Loya Jirga Hall in Kabul, the capital of Afghanistan. Three representatives from each village are invited, most of them were clerics. The meeting was broadcast on radio but not on TV. Supreme Leader of Afghanistan Hibatullah Akhundzada also addressed the council. The gathering of scholars was concluded by the speech of Prime Minister of Afghanistan, Hasan Akhund.

According to reports, Akhundzada addressed the council on Friday, July 1. This is the first time a Taliban leader has traveled from Kandahar to Kabul to address a gathering. Akhundzada rarely appears and has not been seen in public for many years. The meeting of this shura, organized by the Taliban, proved to be a rare occasion in which Supreme Leader Akhundzada delivered a detailed political address.

== Purpose ==
A Taliban source told the AFP that "criticism of the regime would be allowed and thorny issues such as the education of girls, which has divided opinion in the movement, would be discussed."

== Participants ==
A letter signed by the caretaker Prime Minister Mullah Hasan Akhund said that "a huge gathering of ulema from across the country" would be convened, and that a commission led by Deputy Prime Minister Mullah Abdul Ghani Baradar has been tasked with organizing the meeting."

The meeting was attended by more than 3,000 clerics and public figures. From each district, two religious scholars and one tribal elder were invited, while from each police district, two tribal elders and one religious scholar participated. Representatives of Afghan refugees in Pakistan and Iran also attended.

The jirga was not attended by any women. Deputy Prime Minister Abdul Salam Hanafi said that women would be represented by male delegates.

== Preparations ==
The gathering was held at the Kabul Polytechnic University, which closed its doors for students during the event.

According to Taliban spokesman and deputy information minister Zabihullah Mujahid, tight security measures were implemented around the university. However, gunshots were heard around the venue during the meeting, after which the roads leading to the area were blocked and checkpoints set up to avert any similar incident. Later, Mujahid said, "There is no problem around the meeting. Several shots were fired by security forces at a suspicious location. Things are under control, no need to worry."

== Event ==
The event lasted from June 29/30 to July 2/3.

=== Opening ===
Acting Prime Minister Mullah Akhund opened the jirga by asking all representatives present to help uphold the Islamic system of governance, saying that the Islamic Emirate is "trying in all aspects to address all issues. There might be problems in some places, but if they are shared with us, we will take steps to solve them."

=== Supreme leader's speech ===
On July 1, the Taliban's Supreme Leader, Mawlawi Hibatullah Akhundzada gave a speech, broadcast by state radio, that lasted for an hour.

In his speech, Akhundzada described the Taliban takeover of Afghanistan as "a source of pride for Afghans but also for Muslims all over the world." He reaffirmed his commitment to implement the Islamic Sharia law, and voiced his opposition to the "way of life of non-believers." He criticized the Americans, saying, "You have dropped the Mother of All Bombs [in Afghanistan] and [even] if you use the atomic bomb against us we will not deviate from Islam or Sharia.”

Akhundzada warned foreigners against interfering in Afghanistan. He said that Afghanistan "cannot develop without being independent," stating that foreigners should not give Afghans orders. On the other hand, he expressed that his government wants "good relations" with the United States, and reiterated that Afghanistan will not allow its territory to be used against its neighbors.

=== 11-point statement ===
Mujib Rahman Ansari, a cleric who attended the jirga, said that an 11-point statement released at the end urges other countries, the United Nations, Islamic organizations and others to recognize a Taliban-led Afghanistan, remove all sanctions and unfreeze Afghan assets abroad.
