= Ministry of Hajj and Religious Affairs =

Government ministry of Afghanistan

Afghan Ministry of Hajj and Religious Affairs
- Pashto: د ارشاد، حج او اوقافو وزارت (Dari: وزارت ارشاد، حج و اوقاف)
- Ministry flag

Agency overview
- Jurisdiction: Government of Afghanistan
- Headquarters: Faiza Mohmmad Square, Kabul, Afghanistan
- Minister responsible: Noor Mohammad Saqib
- Website: https://www.mohia.gov.af/en

Past and current governments of Afghanistan have included a minister of Haj and Religious Affairs (Pashto: د ارشاد، حج او اوقافو وزارت, Dari: وزارت ارشاد، حج و اوقاف) in their cabinets. The Current Acting Minister of Haj and Religious Affairs is Noor Mohammad Saqib.

== The Ministry ==
The Ministry of Haj and Religious Affairs is the key ministry responsible for addressing religious affairs in Afghanistan. Responsibilities for the Ministry include: sending Afghan Haji (pilgrims) for the performance of Haj to Saudi Arabia; sending mu’tamir (for the performance of Umrah Haj) through private tourism companies; collecting endowment-related revenues and submitting them to the government in a specific bank account; identification and acquisition of endowment-related property; providing girls and boys with Islamic teachings in the mosques and holy places; co-ordinating Qaris- and Hafiz-related affairs and ensuring cultural and publicity affairs; Khanqas; ensuring diplomatic relations with embassies and with Islamic welfare organisations around the globe through Ministry of Foreign Affairs; issuance of Fatwas and testing of Imams and preachers; better co-ordinating of preaching affairs through mosques and Takia khana; convening religious meetings and ceremonies; and raising public awareness on religious issues at the national and sub national level. The Ministry issues the Payam-e-Haq newsletter and oversees the work of the Islamic Studies Research Centre.

== The Ministers ==
Name	Term	Notes
Mohammad Hanif Balkhi	December 2001 - June 2002	
Mohammed Amin Naziryar	June 2002 - December 2004	
Nematullah Shahrani	December 2004 - January 2010	Deputy minister was, until September 2009, Sayed Noorullah Murad.
Enayatullah Baleegh	January 2010 - January 2010	Was nominated by President Karzai, but rejected by the Afghan House of the People.
Yusuf Niazi	January 2010 - November 2014	
Daiulhaq Abid (acting)	Unknown	
Faiz Mohammad Usmani	December 2014 – 7 September 2021	Is appointed as the acting minister by President Ashraf Ghani Ahmadzai
Noor Mohammad Saqib	7 September 2021 – present	Islamic Emirate of Afghanistan
