= Treatment of women by the Taliban =

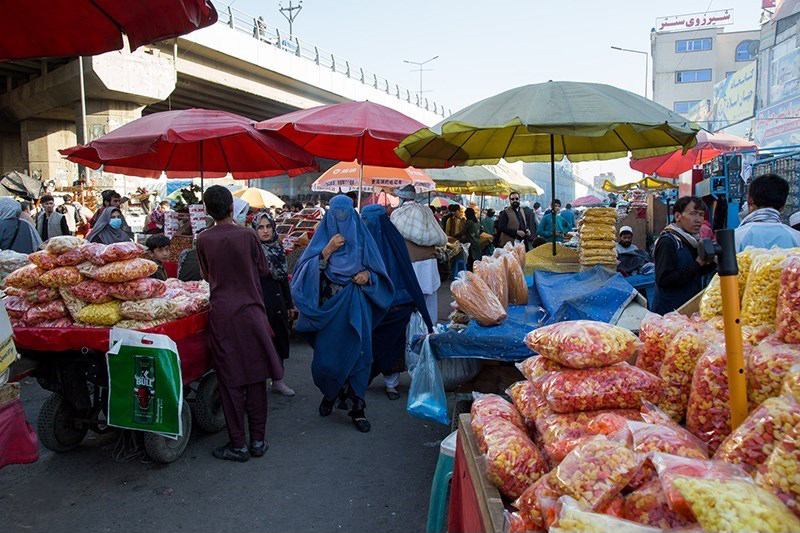
Women wearing the burqa at a market in Kabul in September 2021, one month after the Taliban seized control for the second time.

The Taliban hold strict standards for women's behaviour and dress, based on a fundamentalist interpretation of the Hanafi jurisprudence which is enforced through surveillance and force. Human rights groups and the United Nations (UN) have been critical of the group's treatment of women. The UN has said that the Taliban's policy of strict separation of men and women may amount to gender apartheid.

During their first rule of Afghanistan, the Taliban were notorious internationally for their misogyny and violence against women. In 1996, women were mandated to wear the burqa at all times in public. Women were not allowed to work, nor continue their education beyond the age of eight. Women seeking an education were forced to attend underground schools, where they and their teachers risked execution if caught. Women could not be treated by male doctors unless accompanied by a male chaperone, a barrier which deterred women from seeking healthcare, for many leading to untreated illness and/or further health complications. The Taliban enforced these laws through public corporal punishments and public executions.

After retaking control of Afghanistan in 2021, the Taliban initially granted women permission to attend universities, albeit in gender segregated classrooms, on the condition that they followed "Islamic standards". However, shortly after, the group expanded the restriction to prohibit girls from going to school beyond the age of 12 — the only restriction of its kind in the world. Additionally, they have prohibited women in Afghanistan from working in most sectors; there are limited exceptions for healthcare and education, though the Taliban's restrictions have proven prohibitively cumbersome for many women in these fields. Some provinces still allow secondary education for girls, despite the nationwide ban. Women are mandated to wear face coverings in public and barred from travelling more than 70 kilometres (45 mi) without a close male relative. In 2022, Hibatullah Akhundzada, the Taliban's reclusive leader, rejected international criticism and demands to ease human rights restrictions, refusing any negotiations or compromises on the Taliban's governance. Within two years after seizing Afghanistan, the Taliban shut down beauty salons and banned women from accessing gyms and parks. These restrictions have faced near-universal condemnation, including from Islamic governments and clerics in and outside Afghanistan who say the restrictions have no basis in Islam.

== Laws ==
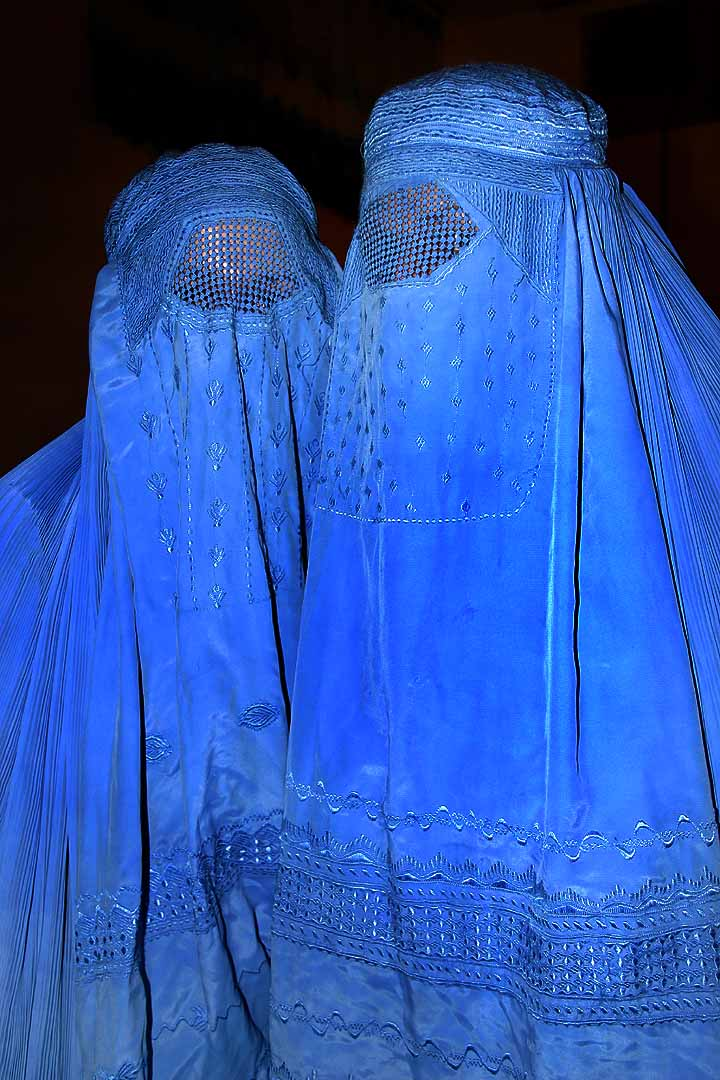
Afghan women wearing the burqa

From the age of eight onward, girls in Afghanistan were not allowed to be in direct contact with males other than a close "blood relative", husband, or in-law (see mahram). From 27 September 1996 to 17 December 2001, when the Taliban were in control of 90 percent of Afghanistan, it imposed the following restrictions on women:

- Women should not appear in public without a mahram.
- Women must wear a burqa in public.
- Women should not wear high-heeled shoes as no man should hear a woman's footsteps lest it might excite him.
- Women must not speak loudly in public as no stranger should hear a woman's voice.
- All street-level windows should be painted over or screened to prevent women from being visible from the street.
- Photographing, filming and displaying pictures of girls and women in newspapers, books, shops or the home was banned.
- The modification of any place names that included the word "women". For example, "women's garden" was renamed "spring garden".
- Women were forbidden to appear on the balconies of their apartments or houses.
- Ban on women's presence on radio, television or at public gatherings of any kind.
- Women were not allowed to wash the laundry at the river banks. If found, the woman was to be brought into the custody of a male guardian who was supposed to severely punish her.

=== Mobility ===
The Taliban rulings regarding public conduct placed severe restrictions on a woman's freedom of movement and created difficulties for those who could not afford a burqa (which was not commonly worn in Afghanistan prior to the rise of the Taliban and considered a fairly expensive garment at upwards of US$9.00 in 1998 (equivalent to about $18 in 2025)) or did not have any mahram. These women faced virtual house arrest. In December 1998, a decree issued by the Ministry for the promotion of Virtue and prevention of Vice banned taxi drivers from transporting women who did not completely cover their faces. A woman who was badly beaten by the Taliban for walking the streets alone stated "my father was killed in battle ... I have no husband, no brother, no son. How am I to live if I can't go out alone?"

A field worker for the NGO Terre des hommes witnessed the impact on female mobility at Kabul's largest state-run orphanage, Taskia Maskan. After the female staff were relieved of their duties, the approximately 400 girls living at the institution were locked inside for a year without being allowed outside for recreation.

Decrees that affected women's mobility were:

- Ban on women riding bicycles or motorcycles, even with their mahrams.
- Women were forbidden to ride in a taxi without a mahram.
- Segregated bus services introduced to prevent males and females travelling on the same bus.

The lives of rural women were less dramatically affected as they generally lived and worked within secure kin environments. A relative level of freedom was necessary for them to continue with their chores or labour. If these women travelled to a nearby town, the same urban restrictions would have applied to them.

=== Employment ===
The Taliban disagreed with past Afghan statutes that allowed the employment of Afghan women in a mixed sex workplace. The claim was that this was a breach of purdah and Sharia law. On 30 September 1996, the Taliban decreed that all women should be banned from employment. It is estimated that 25 percent of government employees were female, and when compounded by losses in other sectors, many thousands of women were affected.

Another loss was for those whom the employed women served. Elementary education of all children, not just girls, was shut down in Kabul, where virtually all of the elementary school teachers were women. Thousands of educated families fled Kabul for Pakistan after the Taliban took the city in 1996.

Between April and June 1998, the United Nations left their offices in Qandahar following disagreements over a regulation which demanded the female staff to only operate accompanied by a mahram. The two parties later came to an agreement over the working conditions, but the Taliban demanded the agreement to be kept secret. However, most expatriate staff including the staff of the UN left Afghanistan following the death of a UN official in August 1998.

Taliban Supreme Leader Mohammed Omar assured female civil servants and teachers they would still receive wages of around US$5 per month, although this was a short-term offering. A Taliban representative stated: "The Taliban's act of giving monthly salaries to 30,000 job-free women, now sitting comfortably at home, is a whiplash in the face of those who are defaming Taliban with reference to the rights of women. These people through baseless propaganda are trying to incite the women of Kabul against the Taliban". A Taliban official mentioned in 1998 that in the Quran it says "stay at home" (in the feminine form), therefore there is not much to do other than to obey.

The Taliban promoted the use of the extended family, or zakat system of charity to ensure women should not need to work. However, years of conflict meant that nuclear families often struggled to support themselves let alone aid additional relatives. Qualification for legislation often rested on men, such as food aid, which had to be collected by a male relative. The possibility that a woman may not possess any living male relatives was dismissed by Mullah Ghaus, the acting foreign minister, who said he was surprised at the degree of international attention and concern for such a small percentage of the Afghan population. A Physicians for Human Rights researcher that travelled to Kabul in 1998 described "a city of beggars" filled with "women who had once been teachers and nurses now moving in the streets like ghosts under their enveloping burqas, selling every possession and begging so as to feed their children."

Female health professionals could be exempt from the employment ban, yet they operated in much-reduced freedom of movement. The ordeal of physically getting to work due to the segregated bus system and widespread harassment meant some women left their jobs by choice. Of those who remained, many lived in fear of the regime and chose to reside at hospitals during the working week to minimise exposure to Taliban forces. These women were vital to ensuring the continuance of gynaecological, ante-natal, and midwifery services, but it was on a much compromised level. Under the Rabbani regime, there had been around 200 female staff working in Kabul's Mullalai Hospital, yet barely 50 remained under the Taliban. NGOs operating in Afghanistan after the fall of the Taliban in 2001 found the shortage of female health professionals to be a significant obstacle to their work.

The other exception to the employment ban allowed a reduced number of humanitarian workers to remain in service. The Taliban segregation codes meant that women were invaluable for gaining access to vulnerable women or conducting outreach research. This exception was not sanctioned by the entire Taliban movement, so instances of female participation, or lack thereof, varied with each circumstance. The city of Herat was particularly affected by Taliban adjustments to the treatment of women, as it had been one of the more cosmopolitan and outward-looking areas of Afghanistan prior to 1995. Women had previously been allowed to work in a limited range of jobs, but this was stopped by Taliban authorities. The new governor of Herat, Mullah Razzaq, issued orders for women to be forbidden to pass his office for fear of their distracting nature.

On 19 May 2022, the Taliban rulers ordered all female TV presenters to cover their faces on air. The directive came from the Ministry for the Propagation of Virtue and the Prevention of Vice, which replaced the country's Ministry of Women's Affairs after the Taliban regained control of Afghanistan.

In December 2022, the Taliban banned women from working in non-government organisations (NGOs), and ordered all such organisations to cease employment of female employees. This resulted in some NGOs being unable to continue their work in Afghanistan.

=== Education ===
==== First rule ====
The Taliban claimed to recognise their Islamic duty to offer education to both boys and girls, yet a decree was passed that banned girls above the age of 8 from receiving education. Maulvi Kalamadin insisted it was only a temporary suspension and that women would return to school and work once facilities and street security were adapted to prevent cross-gender contact. The Taliban wished to have total control of Afghanistan before calling upon an Ulema body to determine the content of a new curriculum to replace the Islamic yet unacceptable Mujahadin version.

The female employment ban was felt greatly in the education system. Within Kabul alone, the ruling affected 106,256 girls, 148,223 male students, and 8,000 female university undergraduates. 7,793 female teachers were dismissed, a move that crippled the provision of education and caused 63 schools to close due to a sudden lack of educators. Some women ran clandestine schools within their homes for local children, or for other women under the guise of sewing classes, such as the Golden Needle Sewing School. The learners, parents, and educators were aware of the consequences should the Taliban discover their activities, but for those who felt trapped under the strict Taliban rule, such actions allowed them an opportunity and a sense of self-determination and hope. The Undersecretary of Education Mawlawi Sa'id Shahidkhayl explained in 1998, that education for women was in need of a fatwa regarding its limits.

==== Since 2021 ====
After their takeover of Afghanistan in August 2021, the Taliban initially gender segregated classrooms in universities as long as they "followed Islamic standards". However, in September 2021, they only allowed boys to return to school, preventing most teenage girls from returning to secondary education. The ban did not affect primary schools, but girls' attendance in those schools appeared to also have fallen significantly. In March 2022, the Taliban abruptly reversed their plans to allow girls to resume their secondary school education (defined as grade seven and upwards in Afghanistan). With the exception of the current cohort of university students, this decision leaves graduating from sixth grade as the highest level of educational attainment possible for Afghan women and girls. Secondary schools for boys reopened on schedule. Pakistani Islamic scholars, including Taqi Usmani, urged the Taliban to re-open secondary schools for women.

On 20 December 2022, the Ministry of Higher Education informed the country's public and private universities that women were suspended from university education. The ministry stated that female attendance would remain suspended "until a suitable environment" had been established at universities and promised that it would provide such a setting soon. However, BBC News pointed out that they had previously reneged on similar promises to reopen secondary education. Some Taliban leaders told BBC News that they disagreed with restrictions on female education. The Taliban decision was also widely condemned internationally. Some provinces still allow secondary education for girls despite the ban.

=== Government ===
On 17 August 2021, shortly after the Fall of Kabul, a senior member of the Taliban cultural commission, Enamullah Samangani, called on women to join the government. In contrast, in early September, the Taliban said that women would not be allowed to "work in high-ranking posts" in the government and "ruled out" women in the Cabinet. The acting Cabinet announced by the Taliban on 7 September consisted only of men.

=== Health care ===
Prior to the Taliban taking power in Afghanistan, male doctors had been allowed to treat women in hospitals, but the decree that no male doctor should be allowed to touch the body of a woman under the pretext of consultation was soon introduced. With fewer female health professionals in employment, the distances many women had to travel for attention increased while the provision of ante-natal clinics declined.

In Kabul, some women established informal clinics in their homes to service family and neighbours, yet as medical supplies were hard to obtain, their effectiveness was limited. Many women endured prolonged suffering or a premature death due to the lack of treatment. For those families that had the means, inclination, and mahram support, medical attention could be sought in Pakistan.

In October 1996, women were barred from accessing the traditional hammam, public baths, as the opportunities for socialising were ruled un-Islamic. These baths were an important facility in a nation where few possessed running water and the ban gave cause for the UN to predict a rise in scabies and vaginal infections among women denied methods of hygiene as well as access to health care. Nasrine Gross, an Afghan-American author, stated in 2001 that it has been four years since many Afghan women had been able to pray to their God as "Islam prohibits women from praying without a bath after their periods".

In June 1998, the Taliban banned women from attending general hospitals in the capital, whereas before they had been able to attend a women-only ward of general hospitals. This left only one hospital in Kabul at which they could seek treatment.

After the Taliban takeover, female healthcare workers reported safety issues and being harassed by the Taliban. Maternal health care conditions declined and many doctors reported that infant and child mortality had increased.

In February 2023, the Taliban ordered pharmacies in Kabul and Mazar-i-Sharif to stop selling contraceptive medicines and devices.

==== Ban on women's participation in healthcare sector ====
In December 2024, the Taliban's health ministry banned women from being trained in nursing and midwifery, according to media reports confirmed by The Guardian. This was a reversal of an earlier February 2024 decision to permit basic medical training for women. According to NPR, the health ministry had lobbied for an exemption from the general ban on women's education in the healthcare sector because "in some provinces, the Taliban does not allow women to seek treatment from male medical professionals." The Taliban's ban on basic medical training for women was widely condemned by human rights organizations as a danger to the health and well-being of Afghan women and children, with Afghanistan already having among the highest maternal mortality ratios in the world according to 2020 data, before the Taliban's 2021 seizure of power. For example, Heather Barr of Human Right Watch stated: "If you ban women from being treated by male healthcare professionals, and then you ban women from training to become healthcare professionals, the consequences are clear: women will not have access to healthcare and will die as a result." The Office of the United Nations High Commissioner for Human Rights (OHCHR) stated that the ban "is profoundly discriminatory, short-sighted and puts the lives of women and girls at risk in multiple ways."

=== Forced confinement ===
Family harmony was badly affected by mental stress, isolation and depression that often accompanied the forced confinement of women. A 1998 survey of 160 women residents or former residents of Kabul found that 97 per cent showed signs of serious depression and 71 per cent reported a decline in their physical well-being. Latifa, a Kabul resident and author, wrote:

The apartment resembles a prison or a hospital. Silence weighs heavily on all of us. As none of us do much, we haven't got much to tell each other. Incapable of sharing our emotions, we each enclose ourselves in our own fear and distress. Since everyone is in the same black pit, there isn't much point in repeating time and again that we can't see clearly.

The Taliban closed the country's beauty salons. Nail varnish and cosmetics were prohibited.

Taliban restrictions on the cultural presence of women covered several areas. Place names including the word "women" were modified so that the word was not used. Women were forbidden to laugh loudly as it was considered improper for a stranger to hear a woman's voice. Women were prohibited from participating in sports or entering a sports club.

=== Slavery of women ===
In 2017, Taliban members were accused of sanctioning forced marriages, marital rape, and slavery of women.

== Punishments ==
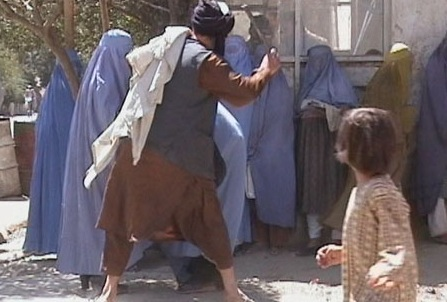
A member of the Taliban's religious police beating an Afghan woman in Kabul on 26 August 2001. The footage was filmed by the Revolutionary Association of the Women of Afghanistan.

Punishments were often carried out publicly, either as formal spectacles held in sports stadiums or town squares or spontaneous street beatings. Civilians lived in fear of harsh penalties as there was little mercy; anyone caught breaking decrees were often treated with extreme violence. Examples include:

- In October 1996, a woman had the tip of her thumb cut off for wearing nail varnish.
- In December 1996, Radio Shari'a announced that 225 Kabul women had been seized and punished for violating the sharia code of dress. The sentence was handed down by a tribunal and the women were lashed on their legs and backs for their misdemeanor. A Taliban official reminded the women to cover their body completely, and to observe Hejab (seclusion of society) as mandated by the Sharia. In case of a violation, there would be no right for complaint.
- In May 1997, five female CARE International employees with authorisation from the Ministry of the Interior to conduct research for an emergency feeding programme were forced from their vehicle by members of the religious police. The guards used a public address system to insult and harass the women before striking them with a metal and leather whip over 1.5 meters (almost 5 feet) in length.

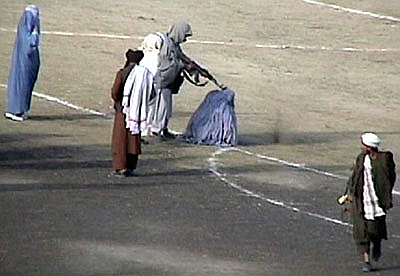
Public execution of a woman, known as Zarmina, by the Taliban at the Ghazi Sports Stadium, Kabul, 16 November 1999. The mother of five children had been found guilty of killing her husband while he slept.

- In 1999, a mother of five children was executed in front of 30,000 spectators in Kabul's Ghazi Sport stadium for murdering her husband (see right). She was imprisoned for three years and extensively tortured prior to the execution. She claimed she acted alone in a bid to protect her daughter (reportedly the actual culprit).
- When a Taliban raid discovered a woman running an informal school in her apartment, they beat the children and threw the woman down a flight of stairs (breaking her leg) and then imprisoned her. They threatened to stone her family publicly if she refused to sign a declaration of loyalty to the Taliban and their laws.
- An Afghan girl named Bibi Aisha was promised to a new family through a tribal method of solving disputes known as baad. When she fled the violence girls often suffer under baad, her new family found her, and a Taliban commander ordered her to be punished as an example, "lest other girls in the village try to do the same thing". Her ears and nose were cut off and she was left for dead in the mountains, but survived.
- Working women are threatened into quitting their jobs. Failure to comply with the Taliban's threats has led to women being shot and killed, as in the case of 22-year-old Hossai in July 2010.
- In 2013, Indian author Sushmita Banerjee was shot dead by Taliban militants for allegedly defying Taliban dictates. She was married to an Afghan businessman and had recently relocated to Afghanistan. Earlier, she had escaped two instances of execution by Taliban in 1995 and later fled to India. Her book based on her escape from Taliban was also filmed in an Indian movie.
- On 12 July 2021, a woman in Faryab Province was beaten to death by Taliban militants and her house was set alight because she would not cook for a group of their fighters.
- In August 2021, Afghan police reported that Taliban extremists had killed an Afghan woman in Balkh Province for wearing tight clothing and not being accompanied by a male relative. The Taliban denied the accusation and said they were investigating the incident.

Many punishments were carried out by individual militias without the sanction of Taliban authorities, as it was against official Taliban policy to punish women in the street. A more official line was the punishment of men for instances of female misconduct: a reflection of a patriarchal society and the belief that men are duty bound to control women. Maulvi Kalamadin stated in 1997, "Since we cannot directly punish women, we try to use taxi drivers and shopkeepers as a means to pressure them" to conform. Examples of punishment of men include:

- If a taxi driver picked up a woman with her face uncovered or unaccompanied by a mahram, then he faced a jail sentence, and the husband would be punished.
- If a woman was caught washing clothes in a river then she would be escorted home by Islamic authorities where her husband/mahram would be severely punished.
- If a tailor was found taking female measurements, the tailor would face imprisonment.

Since the Taliban's seizure of power in 2021, there have been many reports of sexual violence, rape, and torture of Afghan women in Taliban-run prisons, especially after the passage of "anti-begging" laws in 2024 resulted in larger numbers of women being detained. In one incident, "The Guardian has seen video evidence of a female Afghan human rights activist being gang-raped and tortured in a Taliban jail by armed men." The woman who later fled Afghanistan said that after she spoke out against the Taliban from exile, she was sent a video recording of her rape as a threat that it would be sent to her family and released on social media if she continued to speak out against the Taliban regime.

== International response (pre-2021) ==
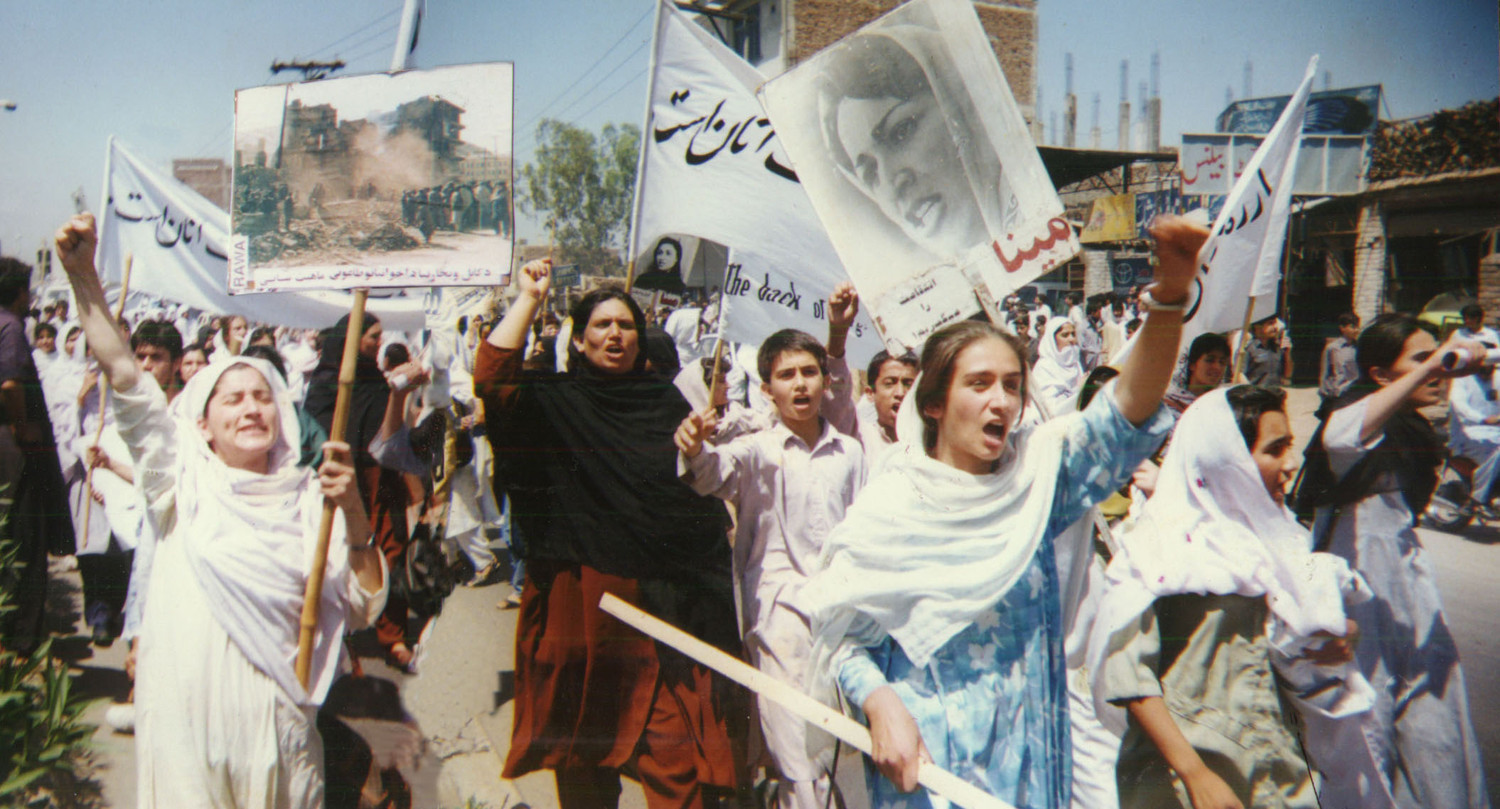
Activists protest against the Taliban on 28 April 1998 in Peshawar, Pakistan.

The protests of international agencies carried little weight with Taliban authorities, who gave precedence to their interpretation of Islamic law and did not feel bound by UN codes or human rights laws. After the Taliban takeover of Herat in 1995, the UN had hoped the gender policies would become more 'moderate' "as it matured from a popular uprising into a responsible government with linkages to the donor community". The Taliban refused to bow to international pressure and reacted calmly to aid suspensions.

- In November 1995, UNICEF suspended all aid to education in regions under Taliban control, as they argued the ban on mixing males and females in education was a breach of the Convention on the Rights of the Child. In the aftermath of the 1995 Beijing Women's Conference, this action moved to solidify UNICEF's role as a leading agency in matters concerning women and children.
- In 1996, Save the Children (UK) also withdrew support as communication with women, the primary child carers, was most difficult.
- UN Secretary-General Boutros Boutros Ghali expressed his concern regarding the status of Afghan women.
- In 1998, a detailed report by Physicians for Human Rights concluded in its executive summary: "To PHR's knowledge, no other regime in the world has methodically and violently forced half of its population into virtual house arrest, prohibiting them on pain of physical punishment from showing their faces, seeking medical care without a male escort, or attending school. ... It is difficult to find another government or would-be government in the world that has deliberately created such poverty by arbitrarily depriving half the population under its control of jobs, schooling, mobility, and health care."
- In 1999, US Secretary of State Madeleine Albright publicly stated "We are speaking up on behalf of the women and girls of Afghanistan, who have been victimised...it is criminal and we each have a responsibility to stop it".

In January 2006, a London conference on Afghanistan led to the creation of an International Compact, which included benchmarks for the treatment of women. The Compact includes the following point: "Gender:By end-1389 (20 March 2011): the National Action Plan for Women in Afghanistan will be fully implemented; and, in line with Afghanistan's MDGs, female participation in all Afghan governance institutions, including elected and appointed bodies and the civil service, will be strengthened." However, an Amnesty International report on 11 June 2008, declared that there needed to be "no more empty promises" with regard to Afghanistan, citing the treatment of women as one such unfulfilled goal.

In September 2021, Pakistan's Prime Minister Imran Khan said that a ban on women's education in Afghanistan would be un-Islamic, and he called for the leadership to be inclusive and respect human rights.

On 29 December 2021, U.S. Secretary of State Antony Blinken announced the appointment of Rina Amiri as special envoy for Afghan women, girls, and human rights. The appointment came as women in the country were facing increased oppression by the ruling Taliban.

== Post-2021 ==
=== Women's dress ===
In May 2022, the Ministry for the Propagation of Virtue and the Prevention of Vice published a decree requiring all women in Afghanistan to wear full-body coverings when in public (either a burqa or an abaya paired with a niqāb, which leaves only the eyes uncovered). The decree said enforcement action including fines, prison time, or termination from government employment would be taken against male "guardians" who fail to ensure their female relatives abide by the law. Rights groups, including the United Nations Mission in Afghanistan, sharply criticised the decision. The decision is expected to adversely affect the Islamic Emirate's chances of international recognition. In an interview with Christiane Amanpour, First Deputy Leader Sirajuddin Haqqani claimed the decree is only advisory and no form of hijab is compulsory in Afghanistan, though this contradicts the reality. It has been speculated that there is a genuine internal policy division over women's rights between hardliners, including Leader Hibatullah Akhundzada, and pragmatists, though they publicly present a united front.

=== Education and employment ===
In July 2022, the Taliban advised female employees in the country's finance ministry to suggest a male relative to replace them so that the women could be dismissed from their positions. Up to 60 female employees reported receiving calls from the HR department requesting them to introduce a male family member to replace them.

While Abdul Baqi Haqqani, the Minister for Higher Education until October 2022, was in favor of women being able to attend universities, his successor Neda Mohammad Nadeem opposes university education for women.

According to BBC report, by 2025 Taliban government cancelled 18 education courses from Universities out of which six were women studies related, that included 'sexual harassment and human rights', midwifery courses, Gender and Development, The Role of Women in Communication, and Women's Sociology.

Taliban also banned around 140 books authored by women out of total 680 books of "concern" being not in line with "Sharia and Taliban policies".

=== Recreation and sports ===
In November 2022, women were banned from gyms, public baths, public parks, and amusement parks.

=== Relationships and reproductive rights ===
In February 2023, The Guardian reported that the Taliban began to restrict access to contraceptives. They ordered pharmacies to clear their stocks of birth control medicine and threatened midwives. In Kabul, Taliban fighters stated that "contraceptive use and family planning is a western agenda".

In March 2024, the Taliban's supreme leader, Hibatullah Akhundzada, announced that the group was reinstating flogging and death by stoning for women as punishment for adultery, saying, "the Taliban's work did not end with the takeover of Kabul, it has only just begun."

In August 2024, the Taliban issued laws banning the transportation of women traveling alone, and women and men who are not related to each other mixing. Also at the same time they issued laws stating women must always veil their bodies in public and that a face covering is necessary and clothing should never be short, thin, or tight. The laws issued then also stated women should veil themselves in front of all male strangers and all non-Muslims, and that women should not be heard reciting, singing, or reading out loud in public, as well as that women are forbidden to look at men they are not related to by blood or marriage and vice versa.

A new penal code was passed in 2026 that permits husbands to inflict physical punishment on their wives and children, provided it does not result in broken bones or open wounds. This code also made it a crime for a woman to visit a relative without her husband's consent, or to fail to return when he demands it.

Child marriage for girls (and boys) is legal in Afghanistan. In May 2026, Decree No. 18 was issued by Afghanistan's justice ministry, saying in part that if a girl is silent on the matter upon reaching puberty, this can be considered as consenting to get married.

=== International response ===
In January 2025, the International Criminal Court (ICC) issued two warrants against the Taliban supreme leader Hibatullah Akhundzada and the Chief judge, Abdul Hakim Haqqani, for committing crimes against humanity with their campaign of oppression and persecution of Afghan women and girls by depriving their freedom of movement, the rights to control their bodies, to education, and to a private and family life, whereas the alleged resistance and opposition are brutally suppressed with murder, imprisonment, torture, rape, and other forms of sexual violence, since 2021. ICC member states are obliged to arrest the wanted if they are on their territory. On 8 July 2025, the ICC upheld the arrest warrants against Akhundzada and Haqqani, with Taliban spokesman Zabihullah Mujahid rejecting them, saying that the Taliban does not recognize the ICC as an entity.

== See also ==
- Criticism of Islam
- Domestic violence in Pakistan
- Family law in Sharia
- Femicide
- Gender apartheid
- Gendercide
- Islam and violence
- Women and religion
- Women in Islam
- Women in Afghanistan
- Women's rights in Afghanistan
- Women in Pakistan
- Tehrik-i-Taliban Pakistan § Claimed and alleged attacks
- Women's rights in Saudi Arabia
