= Sayed Yousuf Halim =

Afghan judge (1959–2022)

Chief Justice of Afghanistan
- In office 27 July 2015 – 15 August 2021
- President: Ashraf Ghani
- Preceded by: Abdul Salam Azimi
- Succeeded by: Abdul Hakim Haqqani

Acting Minister of Justice
- In office 20 March 2014 – 18 April 2015
- President: Hamid Karzai; Ashraf Ghani
- Preceded by: Habibullah Ghaleb
- Succeeded by: Abdul Baseer Anwar

Deputy Minister of Justice for Legal Affairs
- In office 2010–2014
- President: Hamid Karzai

Deputy Minister of Justice for Administrative Affairs
- In office 2009–2010
- President: Hamid Karzai

Personal details
- Born: 1959 Nangahar Province, Kingdom of Afghanistan
- Died: 17 October 2022 (aged 62–63) Emirates' Humanitarian City, Abu Dhabi
- Education: Kabul University (BA)

Sayed Yousuf Halim (1959 – 17 October 2022) was an Afghan judge. He was chief justice of Afghanistan from 2015 to 2021.

== Biography ==
Halim was born in 1959 in Nangahar Province. He worked for the justice ministry from 1985. He became Deputy Minister of Justice for Administrative Affairs in 2009 and Deputy Minister of Justice for Legal Affairs from 2010 to 2014.

He was appointed acting Justice Minister by President Hamid Karzai in 2014 then Chief Justice by President Ashraf Ghani on 27 July 2015.

Halim went into exile in August 2021 after the 2021 Taliban takeover of Afghanistan. He died after suffering a heart attack in the Emirates' Humanitarian City in Abu Dhabi, whilst in a mosque performing evening prayer.
