= Hibatullah Akhundzada =

Supreme Leader of Afghanistan since 2021

Amir al-Mu'minin; Mullah; Mawlawi; Sheikh al-Hadith; Hibatullah Akhundzada
- هبت الله آخندزاده
- Akhundzada's 1990 passport photograph, according to Taliban sources

Supreme Leader of Afghanistan
- Incumbent
- Assumed office 15 August 2021
- Prime Minister: Hasan Akhund
- Deputy: First Deputy; Sirajuddin Haqqani; Second Deputy; Mullah Yaqoob; Third Deputy; Abdul Ghani Baradar
- Preceded by: Ashraf Ghani (as President)
- In exile 25 May 2016 – 15 August 2021 (Note: Acting: 21–25 May 2016)
- Deputy: First Deputy; Sirajuddin Haqqani; Second Deputy; Mullah Yaqoob; Third Deputy; Abdul Ghani Baradar (from 2019)
- Preceded by: Akhtar Mansur
Other positions held
First Deputy Leader of the Islamic Emirate of Afghanistan
In exile 29 July 2015 – 25 May 2016 Serving with Sirajuddin Haqqani
Supreme Leader	Akhtar Mansour; Himself (acting)
Preceded by	Akhtar Mansour
Succeeded by	Sirajuddin Haqqani
Chief Justice of the Islamic Emirate of Afghanistan
In exile 13 November 2001 – 25 May 2016
Supreme Leader	Mullah Omar; Akhtar Mansour; Himself (acting)
Preceded by	Noor Mohammad Saqib
Succeeded by	Abdul Hakim Haqqani
Head of the Eastern Zone Military Court
In office 27 September 1996 – 13 November 2001
Supreme Leader	Mullah Omar
Head of the Military Court of Kabul
In office c. 1995 – 13 November 2001
- Supreme Leader: Mullah Omar

Personal details
- Born: 20 October 1967 (age 59) (Note: Birth year is disputed and ranges from 1959 to 1961, the ICC places his birth date on either 19 or 20 October 1967) Panjwayi District, Kandahar Province, Afghanistan
- Ethnicity: Pashtun
- Tribe: Nurzai
- Political affiliation: Taliban

Military service
- Allegiance: Hezb-i Islami Khalis (1979–1992); Taliban (1996–2021); Islamic Emirate of Afghanistan (1996–2001)
- Years of service: 1979–1992 (Hezb-i Islami Khalis); 1996–2021 (Taliban)
- Battles/wars: See list: Afghan conflict; Soviet–Afghan War; Afghan Civil War (1996–2001); War in Afghanistan (2001–2021); Islamic State–Taliban conflict; Republican insurgency in Afghanistan; Insurgency in Khyber Pakhtunkhwa; Afghanistan–Pakistan clashes (2024–present); Afghanistan–Tajikistan border skirmishes

Religious life
- Religion: Islam
- Denomination: Sunni
- Jurisprudence: Hanafi
- Creed: Maturidi
- Movement: Deobandi

Hibatullah Akhundzada (Note: Pashto: هبت الله آخندزاده, romanized: Hibatullāh Āxundzāda pronounced [ʔi.ba.t̪u.lɑ ʔɑx.wən̪d̪.zɑ.da, hi.ba.t̪ul.lɑ ʔɑ.xund.zɑ.da] Dari: هبت الله آخندزاده, romanized: Hibatullāh Ākhundzāda, pronounced [ʔɪ.bä.t̪ʰʊl.lɑ́ː ʔɑː.xuːn̪d̪.zɑ́ː.dá, hi.bä.t̪ʰʊl.lɑ́ːʱ ʔɑː.xuːn̪d̪.zɑ.d̪á]; Also alternatively spelled as Haibatullah Akhunzada,) (born 20 October 1967) is an Afghan politician and cleric who is serving as the supreme leader of Afghanistan under the Taliban government. He has led the Taliban since 2016, and came to power with its victory over U.S.-backed forces in the 2001–2021 war. A highly reclusive figure, he has almost no digital footprint except for two photographs and several audio recordings of speeches.

Akhundzada is well known for his fatwas on Taliban matters. Unlike many Taliban leaders, Akhundzada does not have any experience in combat, although one of his sons was a suicide bomber. He was an Islamic judge of the Sharia courts of the 1996–2001 Taliban government. He was chosen to lead the Taliban’s shadow court system at the start of the Taliban insurgency, and remained in that post until being elected supreme leader of the Taliban in May 2016. Ayman al-Zawahiri, the leader of al-Qaeda, backed Akhundzada as the Amir al-Mu'minin, which strengthened Akhundzada's jihadist reputation among the Taliban's allies. In 2019, Akhundzada appointed Abdul Ghani Baradar to lead peace talks with the U.S., which led to the 2020 signing of the Doha Agreement that cleared the way for the full withdrawal of United States troops from Afghanistan.

Akhundzada led the Taliban to victory against the Afghan government in a 2021 military offensive—while the U.S. withdrawal was still underway—then became Afghanistan's absolute ruler and imposed a totalitarian (Note: Sources describing his government as totalitarian:) Islamist government. His rule has been criticized for sweeping infringements on human rights, including the rights of women and girls to work and pursue education. On his orders, the Taliban administration has prevented most teenage girls from returning to secondary school education. In July 2025, the International Criminal Court issued arrest warrants for Akhundzada over the alleged persecution of women in Afghanistan. In October 2026, the ICC unsealed the arrest warrant.

== Early and personal life ==
According to Taliban sources, Akhundzada was born on 19 October 1967, in village of Nakhoney in the Panjwayi District of Kandahar Province, then part of the Kingdom of Afghanistan. This information is supported by the International Criminal Court, which states his birth occurred on either 19 or 20 October 1967, in Nakhoney. However, other sources claim that he was born in the nearby village of Sperwan.

According to the then-director of the Afghan National Directorate of Security, Akhundzada was born c. 1959. However, he is believed to be in his 70s (as of March 2023). A Pashtun, he belongs to the Nurzai tribe. His first name, Hibatullah, means "gift from God" in Arabic. His father, Muhammad Akhund, was a religious scholar and led prayers at the Malook mosque in Safid Rawan village. Not owning any land or orchards of their own, his family of very modest means depended on what the congregation paid his father in cash or in a portion of their crops. One of Akhundzada's sons was a suicide bomber.

The family migrated to Quetta in the Balochistan province of Pakistan after the Soviet invasion of Afghanistan (1979). Akhundzada studied at one of the madrassas in Pakistan and earned the title "Sheikh al-Hadith". In the 1980s, he was "involved in the Islamist resistance" to the Soviet military campaign in Afghanistan. According to the Taliban, he fought for Hezb-i Islami Khalis during this time. In the early 1990s, as the Islamist insurgency was gaining ground in Afghanistan following the Soviet occupation, Akhundzada went back to his village in Kandahar Province. Abdul Qayum, a 65-year-old villager, recalled that Akhundzada would have talks with visitors from "the city and from Pakistan." After the United States invasion of Afghanistan in late 2001, Akhundzada escaped to Pakistan and sought shelter in Quetta. Because of his knowledge in Islamic law, he became the head of the Taliban's shadow justice system and the acclaimed trainer of a whole generation of Taliban militants who graduated through Quetta.

On 16 August 2019, Akhundzada's younger brother, Hafiz Ahmadullah, was killed along with at least three other persons in a bomb blast during Friday prayer at the Khair Ul Madaris mosque in Kuchlak, Quetta, Pakistan. More than 20 people were wounded in the attack, including Akhundzada's son and two nephews. Akhundzada used to teach and lead prayers at the mosque and seminary that was attacked.

Officials of the ousted Afghan government, as well as some Western analysts, believed that Akhundzada was killed along with his brother in the bomb blast in Quetta. "If they [the Taliban] announce Akhundzada is no more and we are looking for a new emir, it will factionalize the Taliban, and the Islamic State – Khorasan Province [the rival extremist group] could take advantage," a regional security source told Agence France-Presse. However, the Taliban denied that Akhundzada had died.

According to a Pakistan-based Taliban member, who said he had met Akhundzada three times until 2020, Akhundzada does not use modern technology, preferring to make phone calls on landlines. He added that Akhundzada communicates with Taliban officials via letters. He reportedly has two wives and has had eleven children, though there has been no official acknowledgement or denial of this. Since coming to power, Akhundzada has ruled from Kandahar. According to the Taliban, he lives in a private rental house in the city, not the Presidential Palace in Kabul.

== Role in the Taliban (1994–2021) ==
=== Early career ===
He joined the Taliban in 1994, and became one of its early members. After they gained control of Farah Province in 1995, he was part of the vice and virtue police there. Later, he was the head of the Taliban's military court in eastern Nangarhar Province and then the deputy head of the Supreme Court. He later moved to Kandahar where he was an instructor at the Jihadi Madrasa, a seminary that Taliban founding leader Mohammed Omar looked after.

After the Taliban government fell to the U.S.-led invasion in 2001, Akhundzada became the head of the group's council of religious scholars. He was later appointed as Chief Justice of the Sharia Courts of the Islamic Emirate of Afghanistan and became an advisor to Omar. Rather than a military commander, he has a reputation as a religious leader who was responsible for issuing most of the Taliban's fatwas and settling religious issues among members of the Taliban. Both Omar and Akhtar Mansour, his successor as supreme leader, consulted Akhundzada on matters of fatwa. Akhundzada was a senior member of the Taliban's Quetta Shura.

He was appointed as one of two deputy leaders of the Taliban under Mansour in 2015. He was the most visible face of the Taliban's top leadership, as Mansour mostly stayed out of public view and did not openly attend meetings for security reasons, and the other deputy, Sirajuddin Haqqani, was mostly involved in military affairs. Akhundzada put in place a system under which a commission would be formed under the shadow governor in every province that could investigate abusive commanders or fighters, according to Abdul Bari, a commander in Helmand Province.

Akhundzada was reportedly living in the Ghaus Abad area of Quetta in 2016 and leading up to ten madrassas in Balochistan.

=== As supreme leader ===
Akhundzada was appointed as Taliban supreme leader on 25 May 2016, succeeding Mansour, who had been killed in a U.S. drone strike. Two leading contenders for the role were Sirajuddin Haqqani, Mansour's other deputy, and Mullah Yaqoob, the son of founding leader Mohammad Omar. Akhundzada's appointment surprised some, who saw him as the third ranked candidate, but a compromise choice to avoid resentment if either of the others was appointed. Taliban sources said that Mansour had designated Akhundzada as his successor in his will. Yaqoob and Haqqani were appointed as Akhundzada's two deputies. Abdul Razaq Akhund and Abdul Sata Akhund pledged their support to Akhundzada in December 2016.

Yousef Ahmadi, the Taliban's main spokesmen for southern Afghanistan, said that Akhundzada's younger son Abdur Rahman Khalid had died carrying out a suicide attack on an Afghan military base in Girishk in Helmand Province in July 2017. Taliban officials said that Akhundzada was aware of his son's intention and approved of it. In 2019, under the leadership of Akhundzada, Taliban won the Battle of Darzab by defeating the Islamic State of Iraq and the Levant's Khorasan branch.

=== Assassination attempts ===
At least three attempts have been made to assassinate Akhundzada. During a 2012 lecture by Akhundzada, in Quetta, a man stood up among the students and pointed a pistol at Akhundzada from a close range, but the pistol jammed. Mullah Ibrahim, a student of Akhundzada, told The New York Times that "Taliban rushed to tackle" and restrain the attacker, before he could clear the jam; Akhundzada reportedly did not move during the incident, or the chaos that followed. The Taliban accused the National Directorate of Security, the Afghan intelligence agency, of the attempted shooting.

During the Friday prayer on 16 August 2019, a powerful blast tore through the Khair Ul Madaris mosque in Kuchlak, Quetta, Pakistan, killing Akhundzada's brother Hafiz Ahmadullah and their father. Ahmadullah had succeeded Akhundzada as leader of the mosque, which had served as the main meeting place of the Quetta Shura after Akhundzada was appointed as the Taliban emir. "It was a timed device planted under the wooden chair of the prayer leader," said Abdul Razzaq Cheema, the Quetta police chief. However, the police did not reveal the identity of the victims. More of Akhundzada's relatives were later confirmed to have died in the blast. The High Council of Afghanistan Islamic Emirate, a breakaway faction of the Taliban, claimed responsibility for the attack, adding that the prime target was Akhundzada.

On 18 May 2024, the Afghanistan Freedom Front (AFF) insurgency group released a statement claiming that they carried out an assassination attempt against Azhundzada near the Shah-Do Shamshira Mosque in Kabul while he was visiting the city. According to the AFF statement, Azhundzada escaped, while three of his special security guards were killed and one was injured. The AFF also posted a video of what they claimed was the attack on their X social media account. The Taliban did not comment on the report, though it was acknowledged by Afghanistan International that local sources did report an explosion in the first district of Kabul.

== Supreme leader of Afghanistan (2021–present) ==
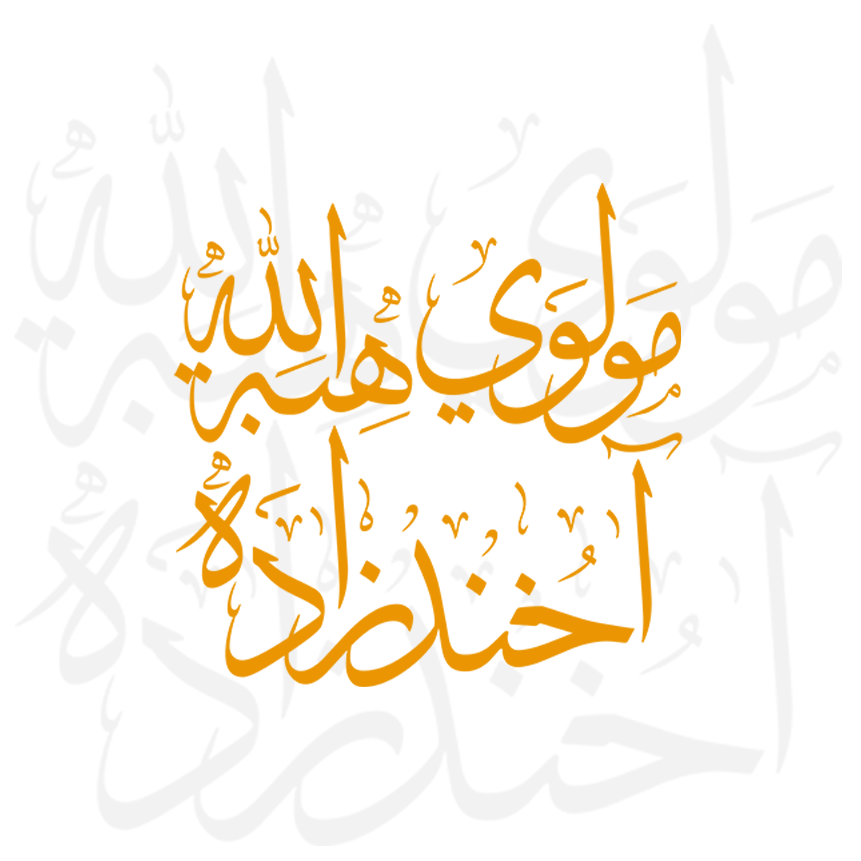
Calligraphic depiction of Akhundzada's name used on Afghan government websites

In May 2021, Akhundzada called for the Afghan people to unite for the development of an Islamic state once the United States forces withdrew. In August 2021, forces under his nominal command began a general offensive seeking to achieve a final victory in the war. During the leadership of Akhundzada, the United States troops withdrew, and the Taliban gained control of Kabul. On 18 August, it was announced that based on the general amnesty issued by Akhundzada, "it was decided to release political detainees from all prisons of Afghanistan". By this time, the Taliban had already taken control of key prisons across the country and freed thousands of inmates, including al-Qaeda members and senior Taliban figures. Allegedly, ISIS-K fighters were also released.

With little known about Akhundzada and a lack of any photographs of him in the aftermath of the fall of Kabul, questions were raised about whether he was alive and remained a leader. Media reports after the fall of Kabul suggested that he was in the custody of the Pakistani Army. However, on 21 August, the Taliban told The Sunday Guardian that Akhundzada was alive and based in Kandahar. On 8 September, Akhundzada issued a statement addressed to the interim government, telling it to uphold Sharia in Afghanistan.

On 3 December 2021, Akhundzada issued a decree that stipulated women’s rights under Sharia. It stated that women have a right to marital consent and cannot be treated as property. It added that widows were allowed to maritally consent to new husbands, receive payment from their new husbands during Nekah, and inherit property equally among their family. The Ministry of Hajj and Religious Affairs, the Ministry of Information and Culture, and the Supreme Court were instructed to implement the decree and communicate it to the public.

On 8 December 2021, Akhundzada instructed provincial governors to convince individuals not to leave the country and try to address their grievances while increasing security measures.

On 14 March 2022, Akhundzada issued directives consisting of 14 points to the Armed Forces of the Islamic Emirate of Afghanistan concerning the conduct of its personnel.

From 27 to 28 March 2022, Akhundzada instructed the Council of Ministers to implement a new round of restrictions. He also ordered a ban on foreign broadcasts from being issued in Afghanistan and instructed the Ministry for the Propagation of Virtue and the Prevention of Vice to enforce gender segregation of public parks, prevent women from boarding aircraft if unaccompanied by a male chaperone, to bar male civil servants from going to work if they are not wearing a turban or sporting a full beard and ban the use of mobile phones in universities. He also issued a decree with instructions on the same day to the security forces, ordering them to avoid hiring and deploying minors.

On 3 April 2022, Akhundzada signed a decree banning the cultivation of opium in Afghanistan, with any violators being treated "according to Sharia law." The order and transportation of other narcotics were also forbidden.

On 29 April 2022, Akhundzada urged the world to recognise the Taliban government in a message ahead of the Eid holidays.

On 7 May 2022, the Ministry for the Propagation of Virtue and the Prevention of Vice published a decree personally approved by Akhundzada, requiring all women in Afghanistan to cover their entire bodies except for their eyes when in public, with the chadaree being the recommended covering.

On 21 July 2022, Akhundzada issued a decree banning criticism or dissension against the Islamic Emirate among the public. It stated that "It is not permissible to make false accusations against officials or to criticize them..."

On 14 November 2022, he issued orders to the judiciary to enforce Hudud fully and Qisas (corporal) punishments if crimes meet such standards. This led to concern that the widespread usage of flogging, amputation, and stoning as punishments could resume. A week later, twelve people were publicly flogged in Logar Province, in what was seen as an implementation of Akhundzada's order. This was the first confirmed use of the punishment since the Taliban's return to power.

In January 2025, he warned against "insiders in the government" plotting against each other, warning that "as a result of these divisions, the emirate will collapse and end". The contents of the speech was later leaked to BBC News.

On 23 January 2025, the International Criminal Court's chief prosecutor, Karim Ahmad Khan, announced the submission of arrest warrant applications for Taliban leaders, including Akhundzada and Chief Justice Abdul Hakim Haqqani. They are accused of crimes against humanity, specifically the persecution of women and girls, since the Taliban's return to power in August 2021. The charges highlight severe restrictions imposed on Afghan females, encompassing bans on education, employment, and public participation. The warrants were granted by the ICC on 8 July.

On 29 September 2025, Akhundzada ordered a nationwide internet shutdown, saying it was his goal to emulate the ban during Mullah Omar's rule. However, the internet returned three days later without any explanation. According to BBC, cabinet ministers including Abdul Ghani Baradar, Sirajuddin Haqqani and Mullah Yaqoob gathered at the prime minister's office and managed to convince Prime Minister Hasan Akhund to turn the internet back on, leading Akhundzada to back down.

The ICC unsealed the arrest warrant on 5 October 2026.

=== Public appearance ===
In September 2021, it was revealed that Akhundzada had not been seen in public since the Taliban seized control of Kabul the previous month, giving rise to speculation that he might be dead and that a committee was drafting his decrees. The death of the Taliban's founding leader, Mullah Omar, had been previously concealed for two years, and during that time, the Taliban had continued to issue statements in Mullah Omar's name. On 30 October 2021, Taliban officials said Akhundzada made a public appearance at the Darul Uloom Hakimah madrasa in Kandahar. No photos or videos were released, but a ten-minute audio recording was shared by Taliban social media accounts, which might have eased rumours of his death. If the reports are accurate, this would be his first public appearance in Afghanistan. The madrassa's head of security, Massum Shakrullah, told Agence France-Presse that when Akhundzada visited, he was "armed" and accompanied by three security guards. "Even cellphones and sound recorders were not allowed" into the venue, he added. Mohammad Musa, 13, who watched from afar, said Akhundzada looked "exactly the same" as in his only released photograph. Another student, Mohammed, 19, said, "We all were watching him" and that they were "just crying." When Mohammed was asked if he could confirm that it was really Akhundzada, he replied he and his peers were so overjoyed that they "forgot to watch... his face."

On 30 April 2022, Akhundzada made a rare appearance at Eidgah Mosque in Kandahar on the last day of Ramadan and delivered a brief sermon while keeping his back turned to the crowd. During the two-hour event, two helicopters hovered over the mosque. Dozens of Taliban fighters were deployed where Akhundzada and other Taliban leaders were sitting, who did not allow journalists to approach him and barred worshippers from taking photos on cellphones. The voice said to be Akhundzada's came from the front rows of worshippers. Expressing his shock, a worshipper named Aziz Ahmad Ahmadi said, "I cried when I heard the voice of Sheikh Saheb [Akhundzada]. To hear him is like achieving my biggest dream." However, Ahmadi said he had failed to spot Akhundzada among the crowd.

On 1 July 2022, he was said to have appeared at a major religious assembly in Kabul, delivering an hour-long speech broadcast by state radio. Over 3,000 clerics attended the three-day, men-only meeting, but no independent journalist was allowed to attend the gathering. On 12 May 2023, Akhundzada held a secret meeting with Qatari prime minister Mohammed bin Abdulrahman bin Jassim Al-Thani in Kandahar. It is the only time Akhundzada has ever met a foreign official. BBC News reported in January 2026 that according to people who have been in meetings with him, Akhundzada barely spoke at meetings, instead choosing to communicate mainly through gestures, which are then interpreted by a team of elderly clerics in the room. BBC also added that he obscures his face during public settings, with Akhundzada often standing at an angle when addressing an audience.

In March 2026, Akhundzada made an appearance at the Eidgah Mosque in Kandahar to lead Eid al-Fitr prayers.

== Political views ==
Hibatullah Akhundzada is reported to be a religiously fundamentalist adherent of the Hanafi school with theologically constructivist interpretations. In his address on 1 July 2022 to the Great Gathering of Ulema in Kabul, he explained that his vision is based on the Amir al-Mu'minin as an embodiment of virtue, the mosque, and the administration working in tandem to enforce Sharia. It's surmised that he views religious nationalism as a means to legitimize the Islamic Emirate of Afghanistan's clerical governance. He is said to oppose girls' education in Afghanistan, vetoing a plan to return girls to secondary education by 23 March. He also issued and approved a decree on 7 May, requiring women to cover their hair and bodies from the eyes down while in public, and not to leave their residence unless necessary. He also oversaw the implementation of tighter media restrictions, banning the use of mobile phones in post-secondary education and foreign language broadcasts. This is said to be part of an effort to return to the Taliban's style of governance from 1996 to 2001, with Akhundzada modelling his leadership on that of Mullah Omar, the Taliban's founder.

He is part of an ultraconservative clerical faction, which maintains outsized influence on the movement's decision making. This faction includes Chief Justice Abdul Hakim Haqqani, Vice and Virtue Minister Sheikh Mohammad Khalid, and Hajj and Religious Affairs Minister Noor Mohammad Saqib.

External audio
- Kabul ulema gathering speech
- IEA Supreme Leader Hibatullah Akhundzada's full speech, captioned in English by Ariana News, 1 July 2022

On 1 July 2022, at the Great Gathering of Ulema in Kabul, he criticized the international community for "interfering" in his "Islamic" governance, warning that non-Muslim countries would always be opposed to a pure Islamic state. He effectively ruled out an inclusive government. In an apparent rebuke to international calls to ease restrictions on women in Afghanistan, he said "I am not here to fulfill your [foreigners'] wishes, nor are they acceptable to me. I cannot compromise on Sharia to work with you or even move a step forward." He added, "You have used the Mother of All Bombs, and you are welcome to use even the atomic bomb against us, because nothing can scare us into taking any step that is against Islam or Sharia." However, he did not discuss issues such as girls' education in his hour-long speech.

Akhundzada's isolation, autocratic leadership style, and ultraconservative policies have created a growing rift between him and his Kandahar-based clerical advisors, and those running the government in Kabul who have to implement his policies and respond to criticism of them. Though the Taliban has typically presented a united front, internal tensions have become more apparent over time. In February 2023, Akhundzada's top deputy Sirajuddin Haqqani publicly rebuked the government's hardline policies, saying power must not be monopolized and the government must respect the people's concerns.

== Writings ==
Akhundzada is referred to as Shaikh al-Hadith, a clerical title denoting recognized scholarly authority on the traditions and teachings of the Prophet Muhammad, and is an Islamic scholar who has authored several books on religious subjects. Among his books we find:

- Mujahedino ta de Amir ul-Mumenin Larshowene (2017; lit. Instructions to the Mujahedeen from the Commander of the Faithful)

== Bibliography ==
- Burnett, M. Troy (2020). Nationalism Today: Extreme Political Movements Around the World. ABC-CLIO. ISBN 978-1440850004. Two volumes.
- Kuehn, Felix; van Linschoten, Alex Strick (2018). The Taliban Reader: War, Islam and Politics in their Own Words. Oxford University Press. ISBN 978-0190935054.
- Provost, René (2021). Rebel Courts: The Administration of Justice by Armed Insurgents. Oxford University Press. ISBN 978-0190912222.

Legal offices
Preceded by Noor Mohammad Saqib	– In exile – Chief Justice of the Islamic Emirate of Afghanistan; 2001–2016	Succeeded by Abdul Hakim Haqqani
Political offices
Preceded by Akhtar Mansur	– In exile – First Deputy Leader of the Islamic Emirate of Afghanistan; 2015–2016 with Sirajuddin Haqqani; Served under: Akhtar Mansur	Succeeded by Sirajuddin Haqqani
Preceded by Ashraf Ghani (2021) as President; Akhtar Mansur (2016)	Supreme Leader of Afghanistan; 2021–present In exile 2016–2021	Incumbent
