= Fazal Hadi Shinwari =

Afghan Chief Justice from 2001 to 2006

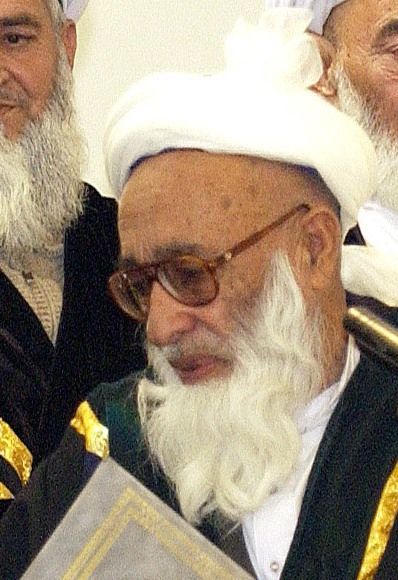
- Shinwari in December 2004

Chief Justice of Afghanistan
- In office 8 January 2002 – 5 August 2006
- President: Hamid Karzai
- Succeeded by: Abdul Salam Azimi

Personal details
- Born: 1927 Shinwar, Afghanistan
- Died: 21 February 2011 (aged 83–84) India
- Party: Islamic Dawah Organisation of Afghanistan
- Occupation: Islamic cleric
- Known for: Chief Justice Supreme Court of Afghanistan, 2002–2006

Fazal Hadi Shinwari (1927 – February 21, 2011) was an Afghan cleric who served as the Chief Justice of the Supreme Court of Afghanistan from 2002 until 2006. He was appointed to the post by Afghan President Hamid Karzai on 8 January 2002 in accordance with the Afghan Constitution approved after the 2001 overthrow of the Taliban government. An ethnic Pashtun from Jalalabad, Afghanistan, he was a member of the Ittehad-al-Islami party. Shinwari died in February 2011 from a stroke.

== Early years ==
Shinwari was born in the Haska Mina village of Shinwar in Nangarhar Province, Afghanistan. He completed Islamic studies in Kabul and became a teacher at Ibn-i-Sina High School in 1954. A few years later he moved to Nangarhar and in 1974 he migrated to neighboring Pakistan. In 2002, Shinwari was appointed Chief Justice by Afghan President Hamid Karzai.

In 2003 Shinwari spoke out against co-education—the education of boys and girls in shared facilities—while clarifying that he did not object to the education of girls and women in principle, just not in facilities shared with men and boys. Shinwari also led the Supreme Court's efforts to ban cable TV.

According to Eurasianet, Shinwari was responsible for reinstating the ministry formerly known as the "Ministry for the Promotion of Virtue and Prevention of Vice".

In theory, that could play into conservatives’ hands. Even though he has repeatedly distanced himself from the Taliban’s interpretation of Islam, Chief Justice Shinwari is an outspoken advocate of orthodoxy. With a background in religious matters only, Shinwari is seen as sympathetic to the pro-Wahhabist views of Abdul Rasul Sayyaf, a former mujaheddin commander and onetime associate of Osama bin Laden. Shinwari’s tenure as Chief Justice drew particular notice in 2003, when he reinstated the hated Ministry for the Promotion of Virtue and Prevention of Vice, renamed as the Ministry for Haj and Religious Affairs.

On December 8, 2004, Shinwari administered the oath of office to Hamid Karzai when he was elected President of Afghanistan.

Shinwari addressed the 17 Afghans who had been held in Guantanamo whose Combatant Status Review Tribunals determined they had never been "enemy combatants" after all. Their Tribunals had been held between August 2, 2004, and late January 2005. Carlotta Gall of The New York Times reported that the Chief Justice encouraged the men to regard their detention as something sent from God. The reports stated that the Chief Justice warned the cleared men that a candid description of their detention could damage the chances of other Afghan captives to be released.

"Don't tell these people the stories of your time in prison because the government is trying to secure the release of others, and it may harm the release of your friends."

Shinwari is also reported to have distinguished between three categories of Guantanamo captives:

"There are three kinds of prisoners in Guantanamo. There are those that have committed crimes and should be there, then there are people who were falsely denounced, and third there are those who are there because of the mistakes of the Americans."

In 2006, President Karzai re-nominated Shinwari to the position of Chief Justice, despite constitutional concerns regarding his degree only in Islamic law. However, the parliament rejected the nomination. Shinwari served as Chief Justice until a new candidate, Abdul Salam Azimi, was approved by parliament.

By Western standards, he was widely considered to be a very conservative Islamist, and in his short term as chief justice some of the court's rulings included:

- the court, during the 2004 presidential election campaign, sought to ban a candidate who questioned whether polygamy was in keeping with the spirit of Islam;
- they have called for an end to cable television service in the country, at least pending government regulation, due in part to the apparent influence of films from Bollywood, which were allegedly prurient ;
- the court upheld the death penalty for two journalists convicted of blasphemy for saying the Islam being practised in the country was reactionary;
- they banned women from singing on television; and
- they ruled that a girl, given as a bride when 9 years old and now 13, could not get a divorce from her abusive husband.

According to the International Crisis Group Shinwari appointed 128 judges, in addition to the original nine, and that of the credentials of 36 judges they were able to examine, none of the new judges had a degree in secular law:

"Shinwari’s actions, together with the re-emergence of a ministry to promote Islamic virtue, have added to fears that the judicial system has been taken over by hard-liners before the Afghan people have had a chance to express their will in a democratic process."

== Saudi peace talks ==
During Ramadan, 2008, there were rumors that Saudi King Abdullah was attempting to broker peace talks between the warring parties from Afghanistan. Former Taliban Foreign Minister Wakil Ahmad Mutawakil former Taliban Ambassador to Pakistan Abdul Salem Zaeef and Shinwari were among leading Afghan figures who met with King Abdullah.

Zaeef acknowledged being invited by King Abdullah to dine with other leading Afghan figures, from the Karzai government, the Taliban, Gulbuddin Hekmatyar's Hezb-e-Islami and other former members of the Taliban. Zaeef denied this meeting should be characterized as "peace talks". He stated that none of the individuals at this meeting had been authorized to conduct negotiations. Zaeef denied anyone discussed Afghanistan at this meeting.
