= Abdul Hakim Haqqani =

Afghan Taliban jurist (born 1967)

Mawlawi Abdul Hakim Haqqani
- عبدالحكيم حقاني
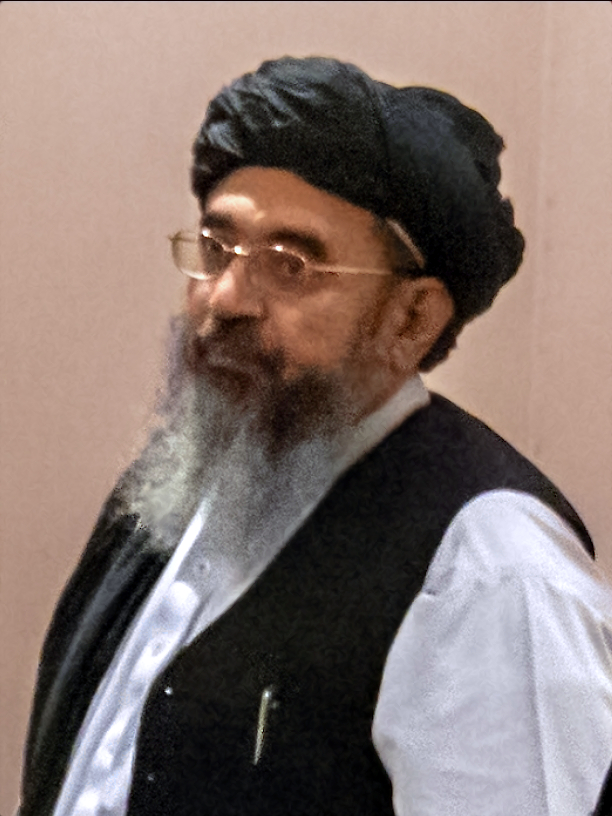
- Haqqani in 2020

Chief Justice of Afghanistan
- Incumbent
- Assumed office 15 August 2021
- Deputy: Qasim Rasikh (First); Sheikh Abdul Malik (Second)
- Supreme Leader: Hibatullah Akhundzada
- Preceded by: Sayed Yousuf Halim
- In exile 25 May 2016 – 15 August 2021
- Supreme Leader: Hibatullah Akhundzada
- Preceded by: Hibatullah Akhundzada

Judge of the Kandahar Primary Court
- In office c. 1995–c. 2001
- Supreme Leader: Mullah Omar

Personal details
- Born: 1967 (age 58–59) Panjwayi, Kandahar Province, Kingdom of Afghanistan
- Education: Darul Uloom Haqqania
- Profession: Politician, writer
- Political affiliation: Taliban

Abdul Hakim Haqqani (Note: Pashto: عبد الحكيم حقاني, pronounced [ˈabdʊl haˈkim haqɑˈni].) (born 1967) is an Afghan Islamic scholar and writer who has been the chief justice of Afghanistan in the Islamic Emirate of Afghanistan since 2021. He has also served as chief justice of the Supreme Court in the 1996–2001 Islamic Emirate of Afghanistan.

He was the chairman of the Taliban negotiation team in the Qatar office. He is one of the founding members of the Taliban and was a close associate of the late leader Mullah Mohammed Omar. In July 2025, the International Criminal Court issued arrest warrants for Haqqani over charges claiming the mistreatment of women by the Taliban in Afghanistan. In August 2026, the ICC unsealed the arrest warrant.

== Early life ==
Haqqani was born to Mawlawi Khudaidad in 1967 in the Panjwayi District of Kandahar Province, Afghanistan. He belongs to the Ishaqzai tribe of Pashtuns.

Abdul Hakim graduated from Darul Uloom Haqqania, a Deobandi Islamic seminary, in Pakistan, and taught there for a time. He gained the surname Haqqani from his affiliation with Darul Uloom Haqqania and is not related to Sirajuddin Haqqani.

== Career ==
=== Teaching ===
Apart from teaching at the Darul Uloom Haqqania, he also ran at some point his own Islamic seminary or madrasa in the Ishaqabad area of Quetta, in Pakistan's Balochistan province.

=== Judiciary ===
During the rule of the first Islamic Emirate, in addition to teaching, he also served in the Appellate Court and at the Central Dar ul-Ifta. Following the appointment of Hibatullah Akhundzada as Supreme Leader, Ishaqzai was appointed Chief Justice.

=== Diplomacy ===
In September 2020, he was appointed the Taliban's chief negotiator for peace talks in Qatar with the government of Afghanistan, replacing Sher Mohammad Abbas Stanikzai, who became his deputy in the 21-member negotiating team.

== Legal issues ==
On 20 July 2023, Abdulhakim Haqqani was sanctioned by the European Union (EU) due to his instrumental role as Chief Justice of the Supreme Court in implementing policies and spreading ideological teachings aimed at creating and justifying gender-based repressions against women in Afghanistan. He was also sanctioned on similar grounds by Australia in 2025.

On 23 January 2025, the International Criminal Court's chief prosecutor, Karim Khan, announced the submission of arrest warrant applications for Abdulhakim Haqqani and supreme leader Hibatullah Akhundzada. Haqqani is accused of a crime against humanity, specifically the persecution of women and girls, since the Taliban's return to power in August 2021. The charges claim severe restrictions imposed on Afghan females, encompassing bans on education, employment, and public participation. The warrants were granted by the ICC Pre-Trial Chamber II on 8 July. The ICC unsealed the arrest warrant on 5 October 2026.

== Books ==
Abdulhakim Haqqani is described as knowledgeable about Islamic jurisprudence according to The Express Tribune. He has published several books, with some translated into Bengali.

== Notes ==
Legal offices
| Preceded by Hibatullah Akhundzada | Chief Justice of Afghanistan (in exile); 2016–2021 | Incumbent |
| Preceded by Sayed Yousuf Halim | Chief Justice of Afghanistan; 2021–present | Incumbent |
Political offices
| Preceded by Abdul Baseer Anwar | Acting Justice Minister of Afghanistan; 2021–present | Incumbent |
