= Supreme Court of Afghanistan =

Highest appeals court of Afghanistan

- Pashto: ستره محكمه; Dari: دادگاه عالی
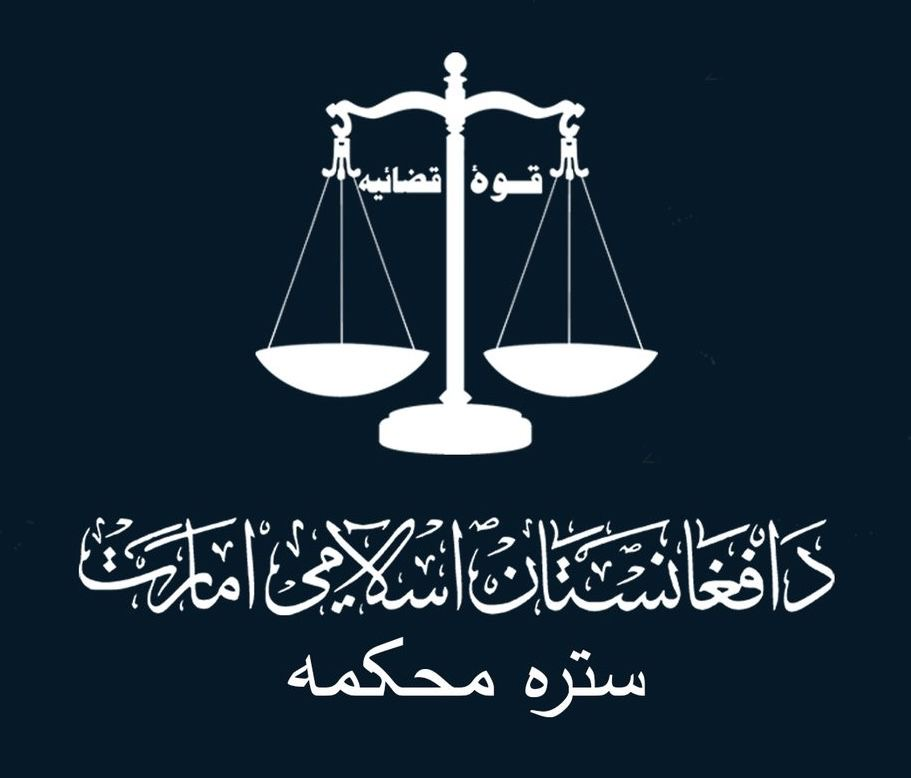
- Logo of the Supreme Court of Afghanistan
- Interactive map of Supreme Court of Afghanistan
- Established: 15 August 2021 (current form)
- Jurisdiction: Afghanistan
- Location: Kabul
- Composition method: Appointment by supreme leader
- Authorised by: 1998 dastur
- Website: supremecourt.gov.af/en

Chief Justice
- Currently: Abdul Hakim Haqqani
- Since: 15 August 2021

The Supreme Court of the Islamic Emirate of Afghanistan, known locally as the Stera Mahkama (Pashto: ستره محكمه; Dari: دادگاه عالی), is the court of last resort of Afghanistan. Under the current Taliban government, the court has no independence or power of judicial review; the supreme leader of Afghanistan holds the ultimate authority to decide and interpret the law and may overturn any decision of any court. The current chief justice is Abdul Hakim Haqqani.

== Democratic Republic (until 1992) ==
During Democratic Republic of Afghanistan Supreme Court have been chaired by Nizamuddin Tahzib then by Abdul Karim Shadan.

== Islamic Republic (2004–2021) ==
The Supreme Court of the Islamic Republic of Afghanistan was the court of last resort in the Islamic Republic of Afghanistan. It was created by the Constitution of Afghanistan, which was approved on January 4, 2004. Its creation was called for by the Bonn Agreement, which read in part:

The judicial power of Afghanistan shall be independent and shall be vested in a Supreme Court of Afghanistan, and such other courts as may be established by the Interim Administration.

At the time of its dissolution, the court was made up of the following justices:

- Chief Justice Sayed Yousuf Halim
- Abdul Malik Kamawi
- Barat Ali Mateen
- Pohadowy Abdulqader Adalatkhwah
- Abdul Haseb Ahadi
- Mohammad Zaman Sangari

The nine justices on the tribunal are appointed for 10-year terms by the President of Afghanistan, with the approval of the Wolesi Jirga, the lower house of the nation's legislature. The President selects one of the nine members to serve as Chief Justice. The constitution allows for judges to be trained in either civil or Islamic law. Matters of law with no provision in the constitution or other standing laws shall be judged by the Hanafi jurisprudence. The judiciary shall apply the Shia school of law in cases dealing with personal matters of those who are of the Shia sect, where applicable.

The Court was previously dominated by conservative religious figures and the former Chief Justice, Fazal Hadi Shinwari, in particular was described as "ultra conservative." Several of its rulings disappointed reform-minded Afghans and people in the Western world. For instance:

- the court, during the 2004 presidential election campaign, sought to ban a candidate who questioned whether polygamy was in keeping with the spirit of Islam;
- they have called for an end to cable television service in the country, at least pending government regulation, due in part to the apparent influence of films from Bollywood, which were allegedly prurient;
- the court upheld the death penalty for two journalists convicted of blasphemy for saying the Islam being practised in the country was reactionary but the journalists were later released.;
- they banned women from singing on television;
- they ruled that a girl, given as a bride when 9 years old and now 13, could not get a divorce from her abusive husband, notwithstanding a law that makes it illegal for girls under 16 to marry.
- they ruled that the punishment for homosexuality is death, even through the penal code of 1976 stipulates long prison sentence for adultery and sodomy.

In 2006, President Hamid Karzai appointed several new, more moderate members to the court. However, he also chose to renominate Faisal Ahmad Shinwari as Chief Justice. Despite controversy surrounding the validity of Shinwari's legal credentials, his nomination was allowed to continue, but ultimately failed when voted on in the National Assembly. Karzai then chose his legal counsel, Abdul Salam Azimi, to succeed Shinwari. Azimi's nomination passed, and the new court was sworn in on August 5, 2006.

On January 17, 2021, 2 female judges working at the Afghan supreme court were killed as they were driving to work.

== Building ==
The Supreme Court is housed in a four-storey office building on Great Massoud Road next to Massoud Circle. On February 7, 2017, a suicide bomber killed 20 people outside the building.

== See also ==
- Law of Afghanistan
