= Chief Justice of Afghanistan =

Head judge on the Supreme Court of Afghanistan

- د افغانستان لوی څارنوال (Pashto) قاضی ارشد افغانستان (Dari)
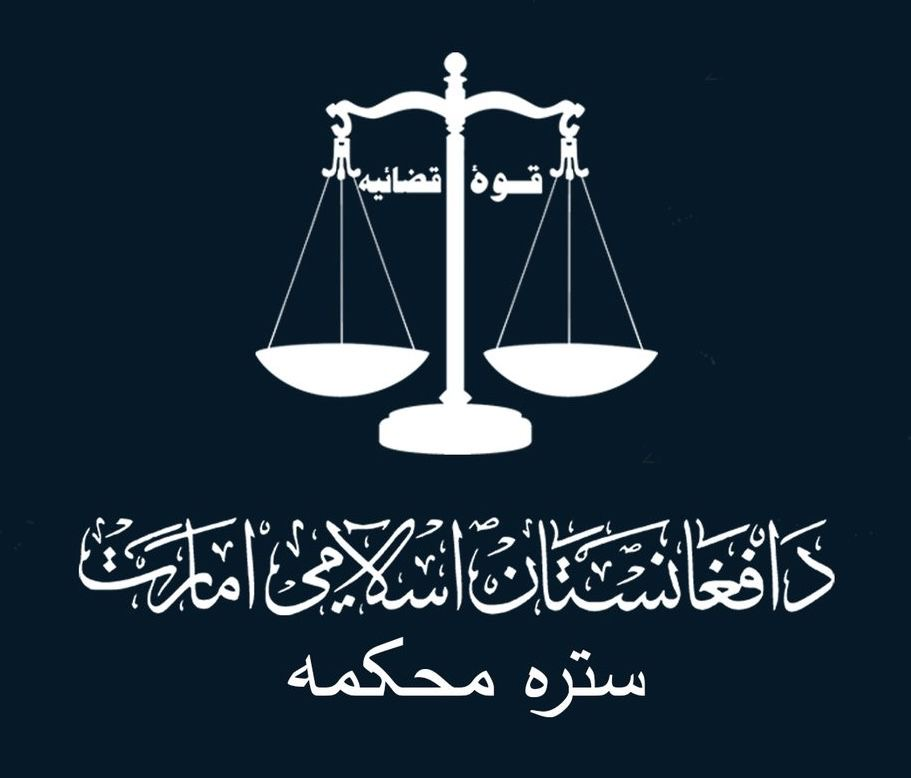
- Logo of the Supreme Court of Afghanistan

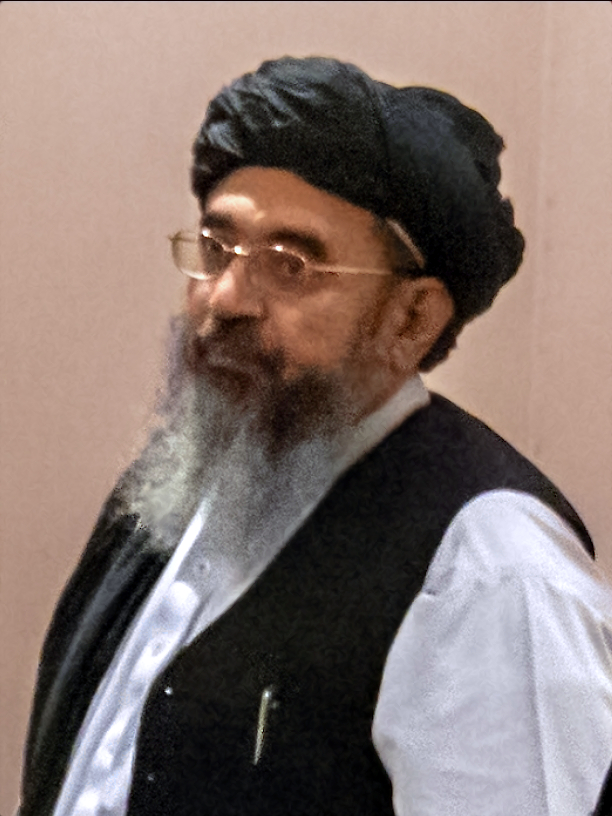
- Incumbent; Abdul Hakim Haqqani since 15 August 2021
- Supreme Court of Afghanistan
- Member of: Leadership Council
- Reports to: Leadership
- Seat: Kabul
- Appointer: Supreme Leader
- Deputy: Deputy Chief Justice

The chief justice of Afghanistan (Pashto: د افغانستان لوی څارنوال; Dari: قاضی ارشد افغانستان) is the head of the Supreme Court of Afghanistan. The current chief justice is Abdul Hakim Haqqani, who is a founding member of the Taliban.

== List of chief justices ==
=== Supreme Court of the Kingdom of Afghanistan (until 1973) ===
- Abdul Hakim Ziayee

=== Supreme Court of the Democratic Republic of Afghanistan (1978–1992) ===
- Nizamuddin Tahzib
- Abdul Karim Shadan

=== Supreme Court of the Islamic Emirate of Afghanistan (1996–2001) ===
- Abdul Satar Sanaie
- Noor Mohammad Saqib

=== Supreme Court of the Islamic Republic of Afghanistan (2001–2021) ===
- Fazal Hadi Shinwari (December 2001 – May 2006), was a member of the Islamic Dawah Organisation of Afghanistan
- Abdul Salam Azimi (5 August 2006 – 23 October 2014), a former professor at the University of Nebraska Omaha in the United States
- Sayed Yousuf Halim (27 July 2015 – 15 August 2021), former Deputy Minister of Justice for Technical Affairs (and Acting Minister of Justice), Deputy Minister for Administrative Affairs, and Head of the Ministry of Justice's General Legislative Department

=== Supreme Court of the Islamic Emirate of Afghanistan (2021–present) ===
- Abdul Hakim Haqqani (15 August 2021 – present)
