= List of decrees by Hibatullah Akhundzada =

Afghanistan is an Islamic theocratic emirate ruled by the Taliban movement, in which the supreme leader's word is law and religious doctrine. Supreme leaders issue decrees from isolation in Kandahar, which are the ultimate source of all law. There is a process for the drafting of legislation, initiated by the relevant cabinet ministry and then screened by the Ministry of Justice for approval by the supreme leader. This process exists only to assist the supreme leader and he regularly enacts law without it. The formality of the process varies, but any order from the supreme leader becomes law once he speaks it, so all that are conveyed to the public by Taliban representatives are listed here regardless of whether there is a written decree.

Hibatullah Akhundzada has been supreme leader since the Taliban took control of the government in August 2021, and he has issued a large number of decrees, many of which have imposed his cultural views, ultraconservative even by Taliban standards, on the country with no opportunity for public consultation.

== List ==
Date promulgated	Description	Text/quote	Ref.
7 September 2021	Appointment of caretaker cabinet led by Hasan Akhund.		
7 September 2021	Outlines policies of the Islamic Emirate following announcement of new Islamic government and cabinet.		
3 December 2021	Outlines the civil rights of women, including marriage and property rights, and instructs the Ministry of Hajj and Religious Affairs, the Ministry of Information and Culture, the Supreme Court, and provincial and district governors to implement them.		
11 January 2022	Creates a Kandahar ulama council to address provincial issues. In reality Akhundzada has since been consulting it on matters of national importance.		
3 April 2022	Bans the production of opium and all other narcotics.		
7 May 2022	Orders women to only leave their homes when necessary, and to fully cover their bodies when they do, preferably with a burqa, and approves punishments for male guardians of women violating the order.		
20 May 2022	Bans Taliban members from taking multiple wives.		
22 June 2022	Announces death toll of the June 2022 Afghanistan earthquake and orders response efforts.		
21 July 2022	Bans criticism of the regime (referred to euphemistically as "false accusations").		
4 August 2022	Nullifies the 1964 Constitution of Afghanistan and the 2004 Constitution of Afghanistan.		
13 November 2022	Orders judges to implement corporal punishments for all Hudud and Qisas offenses.		
11 January 2023	Creates Ulema councils in 13 provinces to manage local issues.		
22 January 2023	Appointment of Mohammad Esa Thani as Acting Minister of Public Works.		
29 January 2023	Appointment of Hanif Abada as Chief of Police of Ghor Province and Qari Gul Haider as Deputy Governor of Ghazni Province.		
18 March 2023	Prohibits the cultivation of hemp and cannabis and orders the Ministry of Interior Affairs to bring violators to court. Mandates the destruction of crops and orders courts to punish violators.		
19 March 2023	Prohibits government officials from hiring relatives. Applies retroactively so that any relatives already hired must be fired.		
19 March 2023	Orders destruction of all seized drugs and alcohol and the tools used to make them, and orders punishment of producers and sellers. Directs the Ministry of Interior Affairs, the General Directorate of Intelligence, and the Ministry of Public Health to implement the order before the courts.		
19 April 2023	Eid al-Fitr message. Outlines codes of conduct for judges and security forces.		
17 May 2023	Temporary appointment of Abdul Kabir as Acting Prime Minister of Afghanistan while Hasan Akhund was recovering from an illness in Kandahar. Hasan Akhund returned to Kabul on 17 July.		
4 July 2023	Bans hair and beauty salons, effective in one month.		
28 December 2024	Ban on windows in buildings occupied by women. Owners of affected buildings with existing windows are ordered to cover them, and authorities are instructed to monitor construction sites to prevent violations.		
9 January 2025	Appointment of Abdul Kabir as Acting Minister for Refugees and Repatriation, and dismissal from his post as Acting Deputy Prime Minister.		
20 January 2025	Exit ban and arrest warrant for Sher Mohammad Abbas Stanikzai.		
27 January 2025	Dismissal of Acting Deputy Foreign Minister Sher Mohammad Abbas Stanikzai and appointment of Naeem Wardak to the position. Appointment of Suhail Shaheen to Wardak's post as head of the Qatar embassy.		
15 August 2025	Appointment of Hassan Akhund as Prime Minister on a permanent rather than acting basis. The same applies to other members of the Akhund cabinet as well.		
29 September 2025	Verbal decree ordering the Afghanistan Telecom Regulatory Authority to indefinitely shut down fiber-optic communication nationwide with the goal of causing an internet blackout.		
13 October 2025	15 appointments to ministerial, provincial, and military positions		
7 January 2026	Proclamation of the new Penal Code of Afghanistan		
