= Abdul Salam Hanafi =

Taliban acting deputy prime minister since 2021

Mawlawi Abdul Salam Hanafi عبدالسلام حنفی
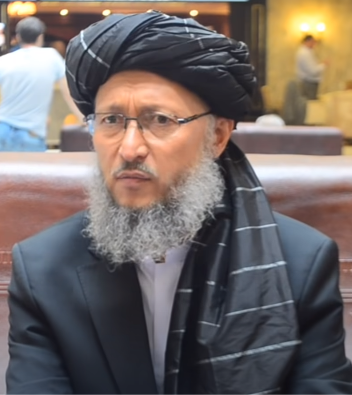
- Hanafi in 2019

Second Deputy Prime Minister for Administrative Affairs of Afghanistan
- Incumbent
- Assumed office 7 September 2021 Serving with Abdul Ghani Baradar
- Leader: Hibatullah Akhundzada
- Prime Minister: Hassan Akhund
- Preceded by: Hasan Akhund (2001)

Deputy Minister of Education
- In office c. 1996 – c. 2001
- Minister: Amir Khan Muttaqi
- Leader: Mohammed Omar
- Succeeded by: Sakhaullah (2021)

Personal details
- Born: Abdul Salam Hanafi; 1969 (age 56–57) Sheberghan, Afghanistan
- Occupation: Politician, Taliban member
- Political affiliation: Taliban
- Ethnicity: Uzbek

Abdul Salam Hanafi (Note: Pashto: عبدالسلام حنفي, Pashto pronunciation: [ˈabdʊl saˈlɑm hanaˈfi], Uzbek/Dari: عبدالسلام حنفی) (born 1969) is an Afghan politician and cleric who is serving as second deputy prime minister, alongside Abdul Ghani Baradar and Abdul Kabir, of Afghanistan since 2021.

An ethnic Uzbek, Hanafi is one of the senior leaders of the Taliban. He was a central member of the negotiation team in the Qatar office. He has also served as deputy minister of education in the Taliban government from 1996–2001. After the Taliban government collapse in 2001, following the United States invasion of Afghanistan, Hanafi was appointed by the Taliban leadership as a top general to oversee the Taliban’s military activities in Jowzjan Province, Northern Afghanistan from May 2007 until sometime in 2008.

Abdul Salam Hanafi is from Jowzjan Province, which is located in northern Afghanistan. He has studied at various religious seminaries including Jamia Darul Uloom, Karachi, Pakistan. Hanafi is given the esteemed title of Mawlawi, a title given to those who studied at religious schools or Madrasas. He has also been teaching at Kabul University for some time. Abdul Salam Hanafi has been part of the Taliban movement from the beginning. However, he is generally known among the Taliban as an Alim-e Din (scholar of the faith).

== Early life and education ==
An ethnic Uzbek, Hanafi was born in 1969 in the Gardan village in the Darzab District of Jowzjan Province.

He got his initial education under local Islamic scholars, studying subjects such as Arabic grammar, logic, rhetoric, jurisprudence and Qur'anic recitation.

He later moved to Pakistan for further religious studies, studying the traditional Islamic sciences, mathematics, logic and other subjects at Jamia Darul Uloom, Karachi, as well madrasas in cities such as Peshawar, Bahawalpur and Rahim Yar Khan.

Outside religion he also studied computer science, accounting and languages, mastering, outside his native Uzbek, Pashto, Persian, English, Arabic, Urdu, Kyrgyz, Turkmen and Turkish.

After completing his studies he became a teacher in different institutions, for instance teaching Islamic culture for three years at Kabul University's Faculty of Law and Political Science.
