= Abdul Ghani Baradar =

Afghan politician (born 1963)

Mullah Abdul Ghani Baradar
- عبدالغنی برادر
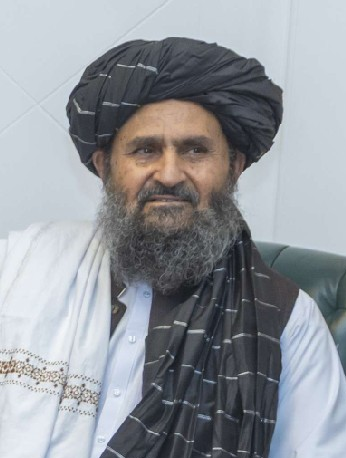
- Baradar in 2026

First Deputy Prime Minister for Economic Affairs of Afghanistan
- Incumbent
- Assumed office 7 September 2021 Serving with Abdul Salam Hanafi
- Supreme Leader: Hibatullah Akhundzada
- Prime Minister: Hasan Akhund
- Preceded by: Hasan Akhund (2001)

Third Deputy Leader of Afghanistan
- Incumbent
- Assumed office 15 August 2021 Serving with Sirajuddin Haqqani and Mullah Yaqoob
- Emir: Hibatullah Akhundzada
- In exile 24 January 2019 – 15 August 2021
- Supreme Leader: Hibatullah Akhundzada
- Preceded by: New seat

Head of the Economic Commission
- Incumbent
- Assumed office 2022
- Supreme Leader: Hibatullah Akhundzada

Head of the Political Office of the Islamic Emirate of Afghanistan
- In exile 24 January 2019 – 17 August 2021
- Supreme Leader: Hibatullah Akhundzada
- Preceded by: Sher Mohammad Abbas Stanikzai
- Succeeded by: Suhail Shaheen

First Deputy Leader of the Islamic Emirate of Afghanistan
- In exile May 2002 – 8 February 2010
- Supreme Leader: Mullah Omar
- Preceded by: Mohammad Rabbani
- Succeeded by: Akhtar Mansour

Deputy Minister of Defense of the Islamic Emirate of Afghanistan
- In office 27 September 1996 – 15 April 1997
- Prime Minister: Mohammad Rabbani
- Supreme Leader: Mullah Omar

Personal details
- Born: 29 September 1963 (age 63) Yatimak, Uruzgan, Afghanistan
- Occupation: Politician, Taliban member
- Awards: 100 Most Influential People in 2021 by Time magazine
- Political affiliation: Taliban
- Website: Government website

Military service
- Allegiance: Taliban (1996-2021); Islamic Emirate of Afghanistan (1996-2001)
- Branch/service: Afghan Army (1996–2001)
- Battles/wars: Soviet–Afghan War; Afghan Civil War (1992-1996); War in Afghanistan (2001–2021)

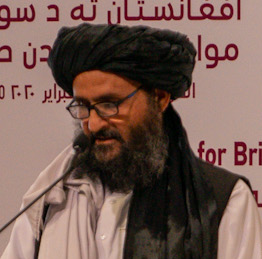
Mullah Baradar in 2020 in Doha, Qatar, to sign the Doha Agreement

Abdul Ghani Baradar (Note: Pashto/Dari: عبدالغني برادر, Pashto pronunciation: [ˈabdʊl ɣaˈni barɑˈdar], Dari pronunciation: [ˈabdʊl ɣaˈniː beɾɑːˈdæɾ]) (born 29 September 1963) is an Afghan politician and religious leader who is the first deputy prime minister, alongside Abdul Salam Hanafi, of the Taliban led government of Afghanistan. A co-founder of the Taliban along with Mullah Omar, he was Omar's top deputy from 2002 to 2010, and since 2019 he has been the Taliban's fourth-in-command, as the third of Leader Hibatullah Akhundzada's three deputies.

He held senior positions in the Taliban during their first rule from 1996 to 2001. After the Taliban government fell to the US-led invasion in 2001, he rose to lead the organization's Quetta Shura in Pakistan, becoming the de facto leader of the Taliban. He was imprisoned by Pakistan in 2010, possibly because he had been discussing a peace deal with the Afghan government secretly, without the involvement of Pakistan. He was released in 2018 at the request of the United States and was subsequently appointed a deputy leader of the Taliban and head of their political office in Qatar. Following the Taliban victory in August 2021, he returned to Afghanistan and received his current government post.

Baradar is considered to be a moderate Taliban member. U.S. President Donald Trump co-signed the February 2020 Doha agreement with him that led to the full withdrawal of United States troops from Afghanistan. After the agreement was signed, the Taliban launched a military offensive against the Afghan government on 15 August 2021, while the U.S. withdrawal was still underway. On 15 September 2021, Baradar was listed on Time magazine as one of the "100 Most Influential People In 2021" for his role in the Taliban's victory.

== Early life ==
Reports of his date and place of birth vary. According to the United Nations Security Council Consolidated List, he was born in about 1968 in the Yatimak village of Deh Rawood District in Uruzgan Province of the Kingdom of Afghanistan. However, identity documents have stated his year of birth as 1963, or his date and place of birth as 29 September 1963 in Uruzgan.

He is a Zirak Durrani Pashtun of the Sadozai tribe, a sub-tribe of the Popalzai. According to Dutch journalist Bette Dam, he and Muhammed Omar became friends when they were teenagers. According to Newsweek, Omar and Baradar may be brothers-in-law via marriage to two sisters. Muhammed Omar the first leader of the Taliban, nicknamed him 'Baradar', which means 'brother', or Mullah Brother.

== Career ==
=== Soviet war ===
He fought during the 1980s in the Soviet–Afghan War in Kandahar (mainly in the Panjwayi area), serving as Omar's deputy in a group of Afghan mujahideen against the Soviet-backed Afghan government. Omar gave him the nom de guerre 'Baradar', which means 'brother', because of their close friendship. He later operated a madrassa in Maiwand, Kandahar Province, alongside Omar.

=== Early Taliban career ===
In 1994, he was one of four men, including Omar, who founded the Taliban in southern Afghanistan. During Taliban rule (1996–2001), Baradar held a variety of posts. He was reportedly governor of Herat and Nimruz provinces, and/or the Corps Commander for western Afghanistan. An unclassified U.S. State Department document lists him as the former Deputy Chief of Army Staff and Commander of Central Army Corps, Kabul, while the United Nations Security Council Consolidated List states that he was the Deputy Minister of Defense.

=== War in Afghanistan ===
Following the 11 September 2001 attacks, the United States invaded Afghanistan and deposed the Taliban with the help of Afghan forces. Baradar fought against the U.S.-supported Northern Alliance and, according to Newsweek, "hopped on a motorcycle and drove his old friend [Omar] to safety in the mountains" in November 2001 as Taliban defenses were crumbling. One story holds that a U.S.-linked Afghan force seized Baradar and other Taliban figures sometime that month, but Pakistani intelligence secured their release. Another story reported by Bette Dam contends that Baradar rescued Hamid Karzai, his fellow Popalzai tribesman, from grave danger when the latter had entered Afghanistan to build anti-Taliban support.

The new Afghan government was organized in accordance with the December 2001 Bonn Agreement; Hamid Karzai served as interim leader and later President of Afghanistan. Baradar now found himself fighting international forces and the newly formed Afghan government. According to historian and counterinsurgency analyst Carter Malkasian, Baradar's decision to pick up arms again after 2001 might have been largely rooted in the failures of Karzai to include the Taliban in the 2002 loya jirga and to enforce an amnesty that would have allowed him and other Taliban members to live peacefully in a post-Taliban Afghanistan. Many fellow Taliban commanders were killed over the years following the initial invasion, including Baradar's rival Dadullah, who was killed in Helmand Province in 2007. Baradar eventually rose to lead the Quetta Shura and became the de facto leader of the Taliban, directing the insurgency from Pakistan. Western diplomats considered him to be among those in the Shura who were more open to contact with the Afghan government, and more resistant to influence from Pakistan's Inter-Services Intelligence. Temperament-wise he has been described as acting as "an old-fashioned Pashtun tribal head" and a consensus builder.

Despite his military activities, Baradar was reportedly behind several attempts to begin peace talks, specifically in 2004 and 2009, and widely seen as a potentially key part of a negotiated peace deal.

=== Imprisonment in Pakistan, 2010–2018 ===
Baradar was arrested by Pakistan's Inter-Services Intelligence (ISI) in late January or early February 2010 in Karachi. Pakistan only confirmed the arrest a week later and Pakistani Interior Minister Rehman Malik denied reports that US agents had been involved in the arrest. According to New York Times reporting soon after the arrest, American intelligence agencies had tipped off Pakistani counter-terror officers about a meeting of militants with a possible link to Baradar, but that it was only after several men had been arrested that they realized one was Baradar himself. According to New York Times reporting months later, Pakistani officials were then claiming that they had been targeting Baradar himself, because he had been secretly discussing a peace deal with the Afghan government without the involvement of Pakistan, who had long supported the Taliban. They claimed that the ISI tracked Baradar's cell phone to an area of Karachi, called on the CIA to use a more sophisticated tracking device to find his precise location, and then the Pakistanis moved in to arrest him. The New York Times concluded that events and motives were still unclear. The story was only lightly covered in the Pakistani press when it initially broke, except for the newspaper Dawn, which published detailed information. Abdul Qayyum Zakir became the Taliban military leader after Baradar's arrest.

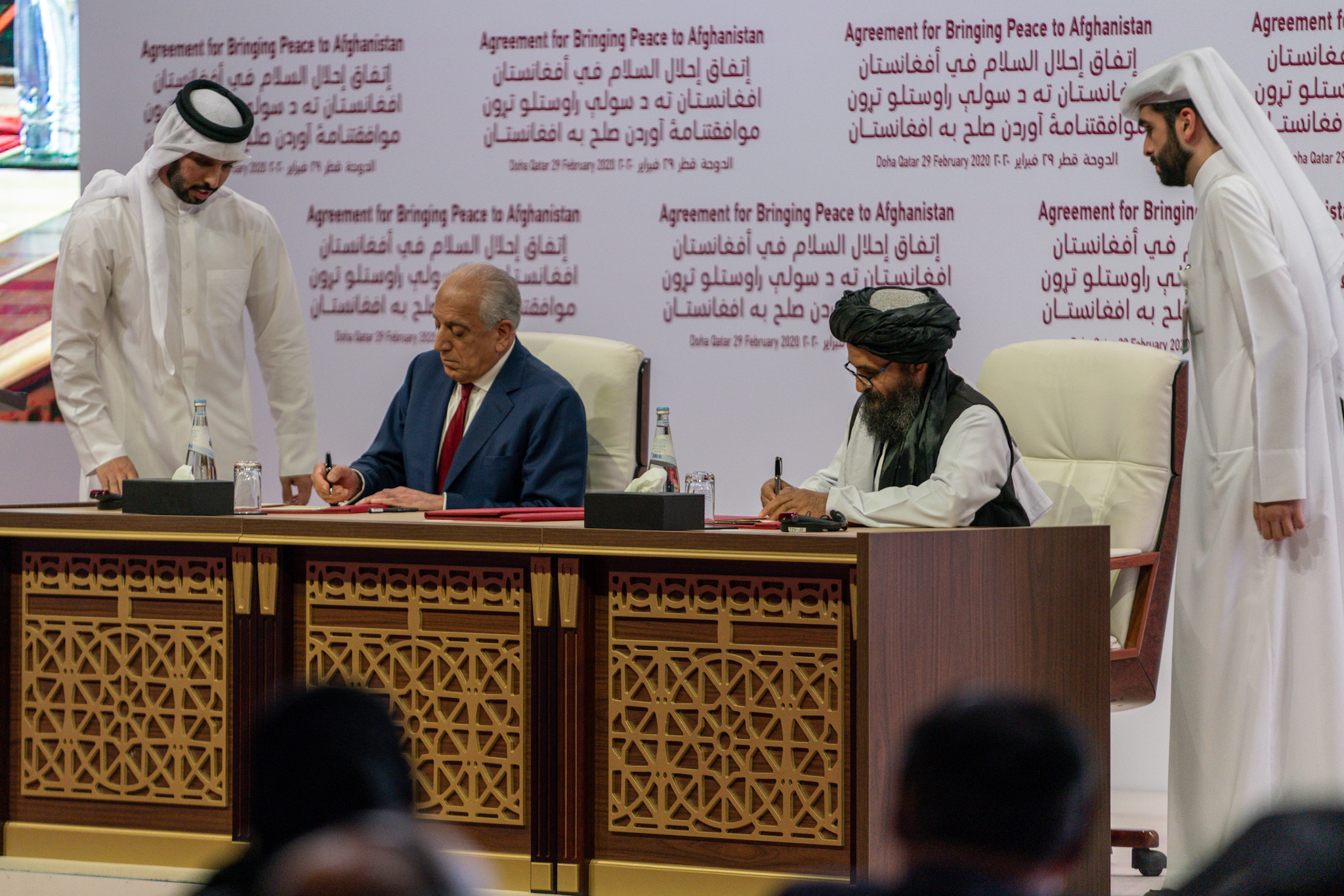
US representative Zalmay Khalilzad (left) and Baradar (right) sign the Agreement for Bringing Peace to Afghanistan in Doha, Qatar, on 29 February 2020

Although some analysts saw Baradar's arrest as a significant shift in Pakistan's position, others claimed that Pakistan arrested Baradar to stop his negotiations with the Karzai government, so that Pakistan would get a seat at the table – because an agreement between the Taliban and the Karzai government could deprive Pakistan of influence in Afghanistan. Another view contended that Pakistani General Ashfaq Parvez Kayani was using the series of Taliban arrests to help extend his own career beyond his slated November 2010 retirement date, the theory being that this would raise his standing among American policymakers and thus pressure the Pakistani government to retain him. The Afghan government was reportedly holding secret talks with Baradar and his arrest was said to have infuriated President Hamid Karzai.

Despite repeated claims that Pakistan would deliver Baradar to Afghanistan if formally asked to do so, and that his extradition was underway, he was expressly excluded from a group of nine Taliban prisoners that Pakistan released in November 2012. They eventually released him in mid-October 2018. Washington special envoy Zalmay Khalilzad said that he had asked Pakistan to release him, as Khalilzad believed Baradar could help in the Afghan peace process.

=== Post-release leadership ===
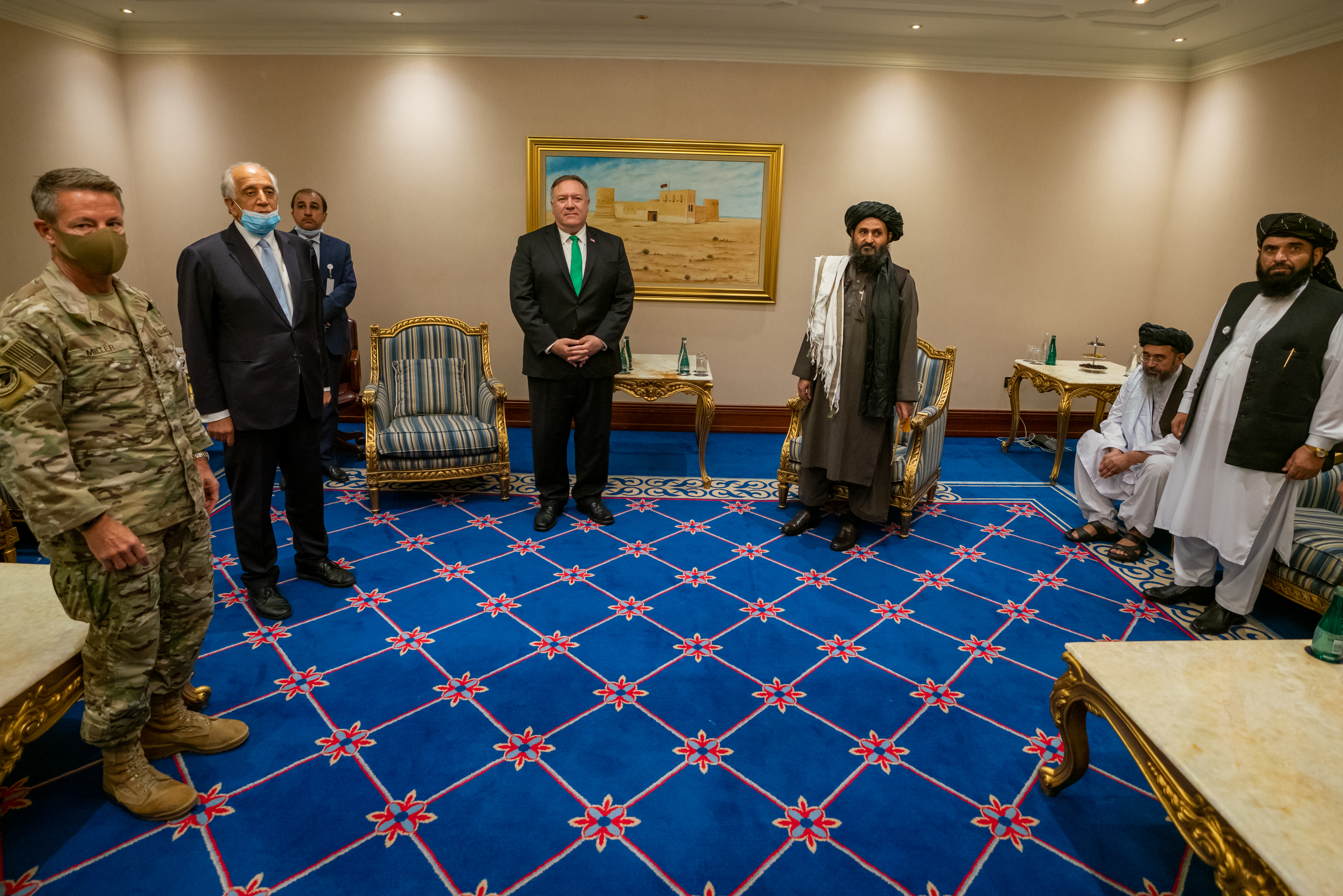
With a delegation meeting US representative Zalmay Khalilzad (2nd left) and Secretary of State Mike Pompeo; Abdul Ghani Baradar (4th left), Abdul Hakim Haqqani (5th left); Suhail Shaheen (far right). September 2020.

Baradar was appointed a deputy to the supreme leader of the Taliban and the chief of the Taliban's political office in Doha, Qatar, in January 2019, about three months after Pakistan released him. He was the most senior of three deputies to the leader, the other two being Sirajuddin Haqqani and Mullah Yaqoob. Although he served under supreme leader Hibatullah Akhundzada, according to The Economist, and The Diplomat, Baradar was regarded as the Taliban's de facto leader. US Secretary of State Mike Pompeo called him "a very sophisticated player" in a meeting with the then President of Afghanistan, Ashraf Ghani.

In February 2020, Baradar signed the Doha Agreement on the withdrawal of US forces from Afghanistan on behalf of the Taliban.

On 17 August 2021, Baradar returned to Afghanistan for the first time since the fall of the first Taliban government in 2001. It was rumored that he would become the president of Afghanistan following the overthrow of the government of Ashraf Ghani by the Taliban in August 2021. On 23 August 2021, CIA Director William J. Burns held a secret meeting with Baradar in Kabul to discuss the 31 August deadline for a U.S. military withdrawal from Afghanistan, Abdul Ghani Baradar was already seen years before the second takeover of the Taliban as its de facto leader, when the Taliban took over again, he was seen as de facto leader of the Islamic Emirate of Afghanistan, between 17 August 2021 and 7 September 2021. On 7 September 2021, it was confirmed that Akhundzada was the leader of the Islamic Emirate of Afghanistan.

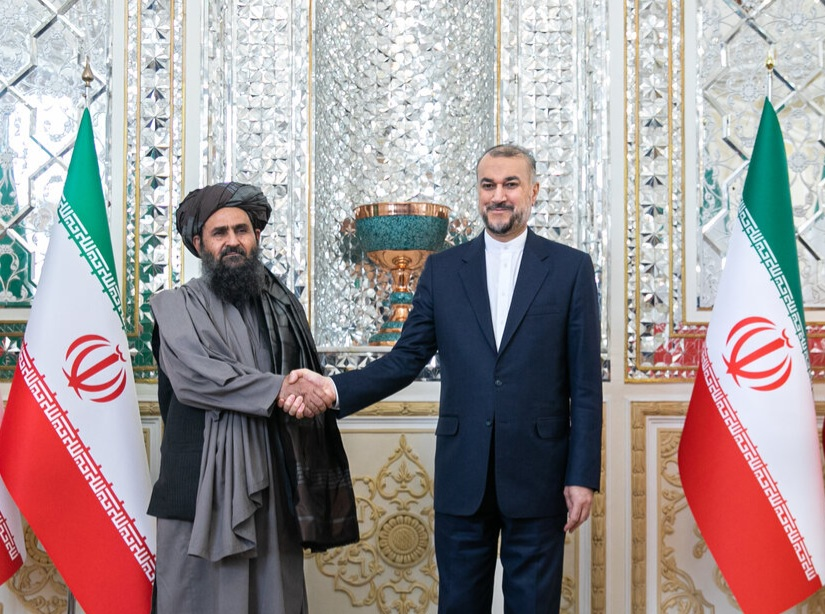
Abdul Ghani Baradar with Iranian Foreign Minister Hossein Amir-Abdollahian in 2023

On 14 September 2021, it was reported that Baradar had not been seen in public for several days, and that there were rumors he had been injured or killed in infighting over power in the new Afghan government. The following day a video interview with Baradar was released, in which he denied the rumors. During the 2nd 2024 United States presidential debates, former U.S. president Donald Trump mentioned Baradar's role in negotiations which led to the end of the war.

== Notes ==
Political offices
Preceded by Mohammad Rabbani	First Deputy Leader of the Islamic Emirate of Afghanistan; 2002–2010 with Obaidullah Akhund (second deputy, 2002–2007); Akhtar Mansour (second deputy, 2007–2010); Served under: Mullah Omar	Succeeded by Akhtar Mansour
Preceded by Sher Mohammad Abbas Stanikzai	Head of the Political Office of the Islamic Emirate of Afghanistan; 2019–2021	Succeeded by Suhail Shaheen
New seat	Third Deputy Leader of the Islamic Emirate of Afghanistan; 2019–present with Sirajuddin Haqqani (first deputy, 2016–present); Mullah Yaqoob (second deputy, 2016–present); Served under: Hibatullah Akhundzada	Incumbent
New seat	Third deputy head of state of Afghanistan; 2021–present	Incumbent
Vacant Title last held by Hasan Akhund (2001)	Acting First Deputy Prime Minister of Afghanistan for Economic Affairs; 2021–present with Abdul Salam Hanafi (acting, second); Abdul Kabir (acting, third); Served under: Hasan Akhund (acting PM)	Incumbent
