= List of ambassadors of Afghanistan =

This is a list of the current ambassadors of Afghanistan. Ambassadors represent the Islamic Republic of Afghanistan, which collapsed in 2021, unless otherwise noted.

| Host country | Ambassador | Notes |
|---|---|---|
| Australia | Wahidullah Waissi | Further information: List of ambassadors of Afghanistan to Australia also Ambassador to Fiji and New Zealand |
| Austria | Manizha Bakhtari | Ambassador to the Republic of Austria and Permanent/Resident Representative to the United Nations and other International and Regional Organizations in Vienna and non-resident to Croatia, Hungary, Liechtenstein, and Slovenia since 2021. |
| Azerbaijan | Muhammad Faisal | Chargé d'affairs a.i. appointed by the Taliban |
| Bangladesh | Shah Wali Nasiry | Chargé d'Affaires a.i. appointed by the Taliban |
| Belgium | Nazifullah Salarzai | Ambassador and Permanent Representative to the EU and NATO |
| Bulgaria | Mohammad Fazil Saifi | Chargé d'Affaires a.i. |
| Canada | Hassan Soroosh | |
| China | Bilal Karimi | Further information: List of ambassadors of Afghanistan to China Appointed Ambassador by the Taliban and accredited by China on 1 December 2023. China was the first country to accredit a Taliban ambassador. |
| Czech Republic | Shahzad Gul Aryobee | Ambassador since 2019. |
| Egypt | Abdul Muqim Qarar | Appointed Acting Director of the Embassy by the Taliban. |
| France | Humayun Azizi | Ambassador since 2020. Also the Afghan Representative to UNESCO. |
| Germany | Abdul Baqi Popal | Chargé d'affaires since November 2024. |
| India | Noor Ahmad Noor | Accredited as the Taliban's chargé d'affaires in January 2026 |
| Indonesia | Sadullah Baloch | Chargé d'Affaires a.i. appointed by the Taliban |
| Iran | Fazl Mohammad Haqqani | Accredited as the Taliban's chargé d'affairs in February 2023 |
| Iraq | Qorban Ali Taloqani | Appointed Acting Consul of the Embassy by the Taliban |
| Italy | Wajiha Qazizadah | Chargé d'affairs a.i. |
| Kazakhstan | Mohammad Rahman Rahmani | Accredited as the Taliban's chargé d'affairs in August 2024 |
| South Korea | Abdul Hakim Atarud | |
| Kuwait | Muhammad Daoud Kharoti | Chargé d'affairs a.i. appointed by the Taliban |
| Malaysia | Naqibullah Ahmadi | Appointed Acting Head of the Embassy by the Taliban in 2023. |
| Netherlands | Mohammad Asif Rahimi | Ambassador since 2020. |
| Norway | Najibullah Sherkhan | Accredited by Norway on 31 January 2025 as the Taliban's First Secretary of the Embassy in Oslo after the Norwegian government forced out Islamic Republic-appointed diplomats. Also accredited to Denmark and Iceland. |
| Oman | Hafiz Omar | Appointed Acting Director of the Embassy by the Taliban in September 2024 |
| Pakistan | Sardar Ahmed Khan Shakeeb | Further information: List of ambassadors of Afghanistan to Pakistan Appointed Charge d'Affaires by the Taliban in October 2021. |
| Poland | Gul Hussain Ahmadi | non-residence Ambassador to the Republic of Estonia, the Republic of Latvia, the Republic of Lithuania and Romania |
| Qatar | Suhail Shaheen | Appointed Acting Ambassador by the Taliban following the dismissal of Naeem Wardak from the position on 27 January 2025 |
| Russia | Gul Hassan | Accredited as the Taliban's ambassador in June 2025 |
| Spain | Mohammad Rahim Peerzada | Chargé d'Affaires, dismissed due to sexual assault allegations |
| Sweden | Najibullah Mohajer | Chargé d’Affaires a.i. since Sweden's government requested Ambassador Abbas Noyan to step down on January 1, 2025. Also accredited to Finland. |
| Switzerland | Nasir Andisha | |
| Tajikistan | Mohammad Zahir Aghbar | |
| Turkey | Saniullah Farahmand | Accredited as the Taliban's ambassador in June 2025 |
| Turkmenistan | Fazal Muhammad Sabir | Appointed Chargé d'Affaires by the Taliban in March 2022. |
| Ukraine | Wali Monawar | Appointed by President Ghani. Also accredited to Moldova. |
| United Arab Emirates | Badruddin Haqqani | Accredited as the Taliban's ambassador in August 2024 |
| Uzbekistan | Abdul Ghaffar Bahr | Accredited as the Taliban's ambassador in September 2024 |
| United Nations | Naseer Faiq (unaffiliated) | Further information: Permanent Representative of Afghanistan to the United Nations Chargé d'Affaires a.i. since December 2021 temporary appointment by the delegation due to the illness of deputy head of mission Mohammad Wali Naeemi, who would have taken over in an acting capacity after Permanent Representative Ghulam Mohammad Ishaczai resigned. When Naeemi recovered in 2022, the UN determined that the Islamic Republic of Afghanistan was no longer official since 2021 and no new appointments could be made, overruling other Afghan diplomats to keep Faiq in his post by default. Faiq now forcefully rejects that he repsents the Islamic Republic of Afghanistan, and acts with complete independence at the UN. He has also rejected Taliban requests to work with them. |

== See also ==
- List of ambassadors
- List of diplomatic missions of Afghanistan
