= United States–Taliban deal =

Afghanistan peace agreement signed in Doha, Qatar early 2020

"Agreement for Bringing Peace to Afghanistan"
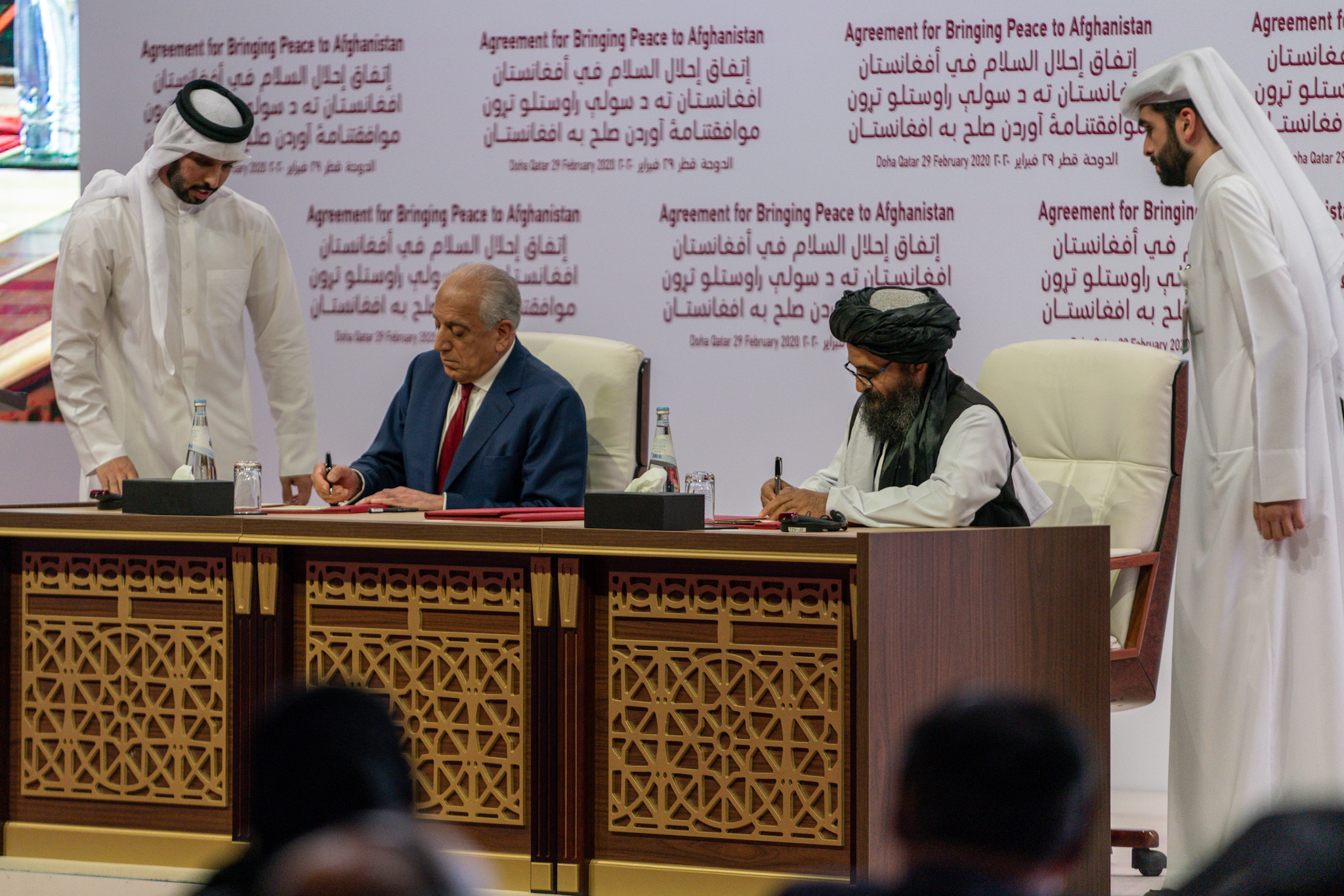
- American diplomat Zalmay Khalilzad (left) and Taliban diplomat Abdul Ghani Baradar (right) signing the agreement in the presence of Qatari mediators at the Sheraton Grand Doha Resort
- Type: Peace treaty
- Context: Ending the War in Afghanistan
- Signed: February 29, 2020; 6 years ago
- Location: Doha, Qatar; Islamabad (Remote)
- Mediators: Qatar; Pakistan
- Parties: United States; Taliban
- Languages: English; Arabic; Pashto; Dari

Full text
- Agreement for Bringing Peace to Afghanistan at Wikisource

The United States–Taliban deal, officially known as the Agreement for Bringing Peace to Afghanistan between the United States and the Islamic Emirate of Afghanistan (which is not recognized by the United States as a state and is known as the Taliban) and commonly known as the Doha Accords, was a peace agreement signed by the United States and the Taliban on 29 February 2020 in Doha, Qatar, with intent to bring an end to the 2001–2021 war in Afghanistan. Negotiated for the U.S. by Zalmay Khalilzad for the first Trump administration, the negotiations for the agreement did not involve the Islamic Republic of Afghanistan, the Afghan government at the time. The deal, which also had secret annexes, was one of the critical events that caused the collapse of the Afghan National Defense and Security Forces (ANDSF). Adhering to the conditions of the deal, the U.S. dramatically reduced the number of U.S. air raids, leaving the ANDSF without a key advantage in keeping the Taliban at bay. This resulted in "a sense of abandonment within the ANDSF and the Afghan population" according to a report by the Special Inspector General for Afghanistan Reconstruction (SIGAR). ANDSF was ill-prepared to sustain security following a U.S. withdrawal, which allowed for the Taliban insurgency, ultimately leading to the Taliban takeover of Kabul on 15 August 2021.

The agreement stipulated fighting restrictions for both the U.S. and the Taliban, and provided for the withdrawal of all NATO forces from Afghanistan in return for the Taliban's counter-terrorism commitments. The U.S. agreed to an initial reduction of its force level from 13,000 to 8,600 within 135 days (i.e. by July 2020), followed by a full withdrawal within 14 months (i.e. by 1 May 2021) if the Taliban kept its commitments. The United States also committed to closing five military bases within 135 days, and expressed its intent to end economic sanctions on the Taliban by August 27, 2020. The agreement was welcomed by Pakistan, China, Russia and India, and unanimously endorsed by the UN Security Council.

Insurgent attacks against the Afghan security forces surged in the aftermath of the deal, however, with thousands killed. Regardless, withdrawals per the agreement continued. By January 2021, just 2,500 U.S. troops remained in the country, and NATO forces fully evacuated by the end of that summer. The U.S. completed its full evacuation on August 30, 2021, as the Taliban took control of the country by force.

Critics of the deal said that the then-incumbent Trump administration appeased the Taliban and ignored the then Afghan government for a quick withdrawal from Afghanistan.

== The agreement ==
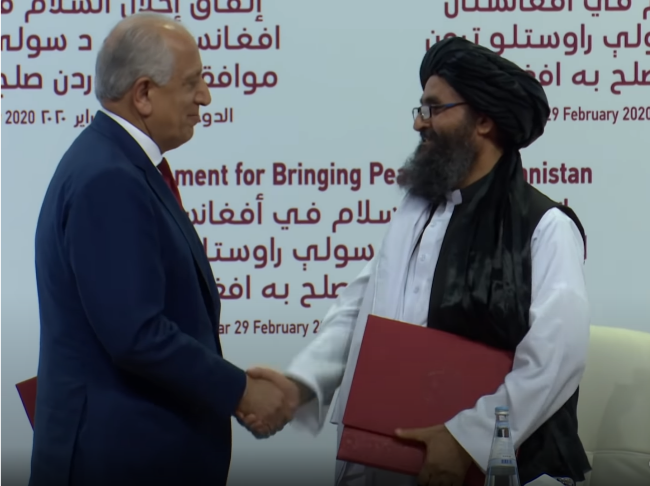
Zalmay Khalilzad and Abdul Ghani Baradar after signing the U.S.–Taliban deal in Doha, Qatar

The intra-Afghan negotiations were scheduled to begin on March 10, 2020 in Oslo, Norway. The composition of the Afghan government negotiating team was not determined, because the results of the 2019 Afghan presidential election were disputed. The deal required the Afghan government to release 5,000 Taliban prisoners by the start of the talks, in a prisoner exchange for 1,000 government soldiers held by the Taliban.

The provisions of the deal included the withdrawal of all NATO troops from Afghanistan, a Taliban pledge to prevent al-Qaeda from operating in areas under Taliban control, a Taliban pledge to not attack United States troops, and talks between the Taliban and the Afghan government. The United States agreed to an initial reduction of its force level from 13,000 to 8,600 by July 2020, followed by a full withdrawal within 14 months if the Taliban kept its commitments. NATO Secretary-General Jens Stoltenberg pledged to bring down NATO's numbers to about 12,000 from roughly 16,000 troops. The United States also committed to closing five military bases within 135 days, and expressed its intent to end economic sanctions on the Taliban by August 27, 2020.

== Intra-Afghan dialogue and negotiations ==
The U.S.–Taliban deal called for intra-Afghan dialogue and negotiations for “a permanent and comprehensive ceasefire” to start on March 10. The Afghan government was not a party to the U.S.–Taliban deal, and on March 1 Afghan president Ashraf Ghani rejected a prisoner exchange, saying: "The government of Afghanistan has made no commitment to free 5,000 Taliban prisoners. [...] The release of prisoners is not the United States authority, but it is the authority of the government of Afghanistan." Ghani also stated that any prisoner exchange "cannot be a prerequisite for talks," but must be a part of the negotiations. On March 2, a Taliban spokesperson stated that they were "fully ready" for the intra-Afghan talks, but that there would be no talks if about 5,000 of their prisoners were not released. He also said that the agreed-upon period of reduction in violence was over and that operations against Afghan government forces could resume.

Nevertheless, the negotiations between the Afghan government and the Taliban for release of prisoners began as planned on March 10, 2020. However, on the same day, Ghani also signed a decree for the release of 1,500 Taliban prisoners on March 14, but only if they agreed to sign pledges guaranteeing they will not return to battle. The same day, the U.S. started withdrawing some troops. Despite the fact that the terms of the peace agreement also received unanimous backing from the UN Security Council, sources close to the Taliban, including Taliban spokesman Suhail Shaheen, afterward announced that the group had rejected Ghani's prisoner swap decree and still insisted on the release of 5,000 Taliban prisoners. On March 14, 2020, Javid Faisal, a spokesman for the National Security Council, announced that Ghani had delayed the release of Taliban prisoners, citing a need to review the list of prisoners, thus endangering the peace agreement between the U.S. government and the Taliban.

On March 27, 2020, the Afghan government announced the formation of a 21-member negotiation team for the peace talks. However, on March 29 the Taliban rejected the team, stating that "we shall only sit for talks with a negotiation team that conforms with our agreements and is constituted in accordance with the laid out principles." On March 31, 2020, a three-person Taliban delegation arrived in Kabul to discuss the release of prisoners. They were the first Taliban representatives to visit Kabul since 2001. The Afghan government had also previously agreed to hold the talks in Bagram Prison. The same day, however, the Afghan government announced that the Taliban's refusal to agree to another ceasefire and the Taliban delegation's refusal to show up at the prison at the scheduled time both resulted in the postponement of the prisoner swap. Following the arrival of the Taliban delegation, a senior Afghan government official told Reuters "the prisoner release might go ahead in a few days if everything goes as planned."

On March 31, 2020, the UN Security Council urged all warring parties to declare a ceasefire in order for the peace process to progress further. On April 1, 2020, it was revealed that both the Taliban and Afghan government did in fact hold face-to-face talks in Kabul the previous day, unlike the previous video conference talks, and that they were overseen by the International Committee of the Red Cross (ICRC). However, Afghanistan's Office of the National Security Council stated that the only progress made so far was "on technical matters" and Taliban spokesman Zabihullah Mujahid afterward stated, "There will be no political talks there." Outside the talks, tensions between the Afghan government and Taliban also showed when Afghan authorities blamed the Taliban for an April 1, 2020 explosion which killed several children in Helmand. On the second day of negotiations, it was agreed that on April 2, 2020, up to 100 Taliban prisoners would be released in exchange for 20 Afghan military personnel

On April 7, 2020, the Taliban walked out of the prisoner swap talks, which Taliban spokesman Suhail Shaheen described as "fruitless." Shaheen also stated in a tweet that hours after walking out of the talks, the Taliban's negotiating team was recalled from Kabul. The Taliban also failed to secure the release of any of the 15 commanders they sought to be released. Arguments over which prisoners to swap also resulted in a delay of the planned prisoner swap. The next day, Faisal maintained that only 100 Taliban prisoners would be released. Faisal later stated that the 100 prisoners, who were incarcerated at Bagram, were released. The Taliban refused to verify these releases, in part due to the fact that the Taliban's withdrawal from Kabul prevented its "technical team" from making verifications of the prisoner identities. As the Afghan government solely determined which prisoners were released, it also could not be confirmed if any of the prisoners released were on the Taliban's list of preferred names.

On May 17, 2020, Ghani signed a power-sharing deal with his rival Abdullah Abdullah which ended the long-running dispute over the results of the 2019 Afghan presidential elections, and assigned responsibility for peace negotiations to Abdullah.

By August 2020, the Afghan government released 5,100 prisoners, and the Taliban released 1,000. However, the Afghan government refused to release 400 prisoners from the list of those the Taliban wanted released, because those 400 were accused of serious crimes. Ghani stated that he did not have the constitutional authority to release these prisoners, so he convened a loya jirga from August 7 to 9 to discuss the issue. The jirga agreed to free the 400 remaining prisoners.

On August 14, 2020, one of the 21 members of the Afghan negotiating team, Fawzia Koofi, and her sister Maryam Koofi were attacked by gunmen near Kabul. Fawzia Koofi is a prominent human rights activist in Afghanistan, who has been vocal in denouncing the Taliban.

Taliban officials accused the Afghan government of intentionally postponing the release of 100 Taliban detainees in order to hamper the negotiations. The Afghan government denied the claims, insisting that all Taliban prisoners had been freed.

By September 2020, the Afghan government had freed about 5,000 Taliban prisoners after a request from the Trump administration. A government mediation team remained on standby to travel to Doha for talks with the Taliban, but delays persisted.

== Resumption of insurgency ==
After the signing of the U.S.–Taliban deal on February 29, 2020, insurgent attacks against Afghan security forces surged. The Taliban resumed offensive operations against the Afghan army and police on March 3, 2020, conducting attacks in Kunduz and Helmand provinces. On March 4, the U.S. conducted airstrikes on Taliban fighters in Afghanistan's southern Helmand province.

However, in the aftermath of the agreement, the U.S. stopped supporting the Afghan military in its offensive operations, forcing it to take mostly defensive positions around the country. According to the agreement, U.S. military aircraft could not attack Taliban groups waiting more than 500 meters away, giving the Taliban an edge in targeting Afghan military units. The agreement also exacerbated the decline in morale of the Afghan army and police, making them more open to accepting bargains with the Taliban. Due to a lack of information and secret annexes in the agreement, that had not been shared even with the then Afghan government, the Taliban were able to spread propaganda and disinformation about the agreement, including convincing local police and military units that the U.S. had handed over territories to the Taliban and that they should abandon their positions.

In the 45 days after the agreement (between March 1 and April 15, 2020), the Taliban conducted more than 4,500 attacks in Afghanistan, an increase of more than 70% compared to the same period in the previous year. More than 900 Afghan security forces were killed in the period, up from about 520 in the same period a year earlier. Meanwhile, because of a significant reduction in the number of offensives and airstrikes by Afghan and U.S. forces against the Taliban, Taliban casualties dropped to 610 in the period down from about 1,660 in the same period a year earlier. The Pentagon spokesman, Jonathan Hoffman, said that although the Taliban stopped conducting attacks against the U.S.-led coalition forces in Afghanistan, the violence was still "unacceptably high" and "not conducive to a diplomatic solution." He added: "We have continued to do defensive attacks to help defend our partners in the area and we will continue to do that."

On June 22, 2020, Afghanistan reported its "bloodiest week in 19 years", during which 291 members of the ANDSF were killed and 550 others wounded in 422 attacks carried out by the Taliban. At least 42 civilians, including women and children, were also killed and 105 others wounded by the Taliban across 18 provinces. During the week, the Taliban kidnapped 60 civilians in the central province of Daykundi.

The U.S. Department of Defense emphasized that overseeing Afghanistan's airspace is the Taliban's responsibility, not the U.S.'s. In response to accusations of unauthorized drone flights, the Pentagon defended its "over-the-horizon" strategy as effective for monitoring threats in Afghanistan.

== Withdrawal of NATO forces ==
The U.S.–Taliban deal also dealt with the withdrawal from Afghanistan of "all military forces of the United States, its allies, and Coalition partners, including all non-diplomatic civilian personnel, private security contractors, trainers, advisors, and supporting services personnel". The Trump administration agreed to an initial reduction of U.S. troops in Afghanistan from 13,000 to 8,600 within 135 days (i.e., by July 2020), followed by a full withdrawal within 14 months (i.e., by 1 May 2021), if the Taliban kept its commitments. NATO Secretary-General Jens Stoltenberg pledged to bring down NATO's numbers to about 12,000 from roughly 16,000 troops. The United States also committed to closing five military bases within 135 days. On March 10, 2020, the U.S. started withdrawing some soldiers.

On July 1, 2020, the U.S. House Armed Services Committee overwhelmingly voted in favor of an amendment to the National Defense Authorization Act to restrict President Trump's ability to withdraw U.S. troops from Afghanistan below the 8,600 that had been acted on.

On 20 January 2021, at the inauguration of Joe Biden, there were 2,500 U.S. soldiers still in Afghanistan. Biden's national security adviser, Jake Sullivan, said that the administration would review the withdrawal agreement. On 14 April 2021, the Biden administration said the U.S. would not withdraw the remaining soldiers by 1 May, but would withdraw them by 11 September. On 8 July, Biden specified a U.S. withdrawal date of 31 August.

Other Western forces set their own withdrawal timetables. Germany and Italy withdrew their troops from Afghanistan on 2 July 2021. Australia completed its withdrawal on 15 July. The final British flight was on 28 August.

Throughout August 2021, the Taliban rapidly took control of the country by force. The remaining U.S. soldiers were withdrawn by August 30, 2021.

== See also ==
- Afghan peace process
- Geneva Accords (1988)
- Munich Agreement
- Paris Peace Accords
- 1991 Paris Peace Agreements
- 2025 hunger crisis in Afghanistan
