= Ministry of Foreign Affairs (Afghanistan) =

Afghan government ministry responsible for foreign affairs matters

- Dari: وزارت خارجه افغانستان; Pashto: د افغانستان د بهرنیو چارو وزارت
- Logo of the Ministry of Foreign Affairs of the Islamic Emirate of Afghanistan

Department overview
- Formed: 1907
- Jurisdiction: Government of Afghanistan
- Headquarters: Kabul; 34.525188°N 69.176687°E
- Minister responsible: Amir Khan Muttaqi
- Deputy Minister responsible: Naeem Wardak (Acting)
- Department executive: Abdul Qahar Balkhi, Spokesperson
- Website: Official website Official YouTube channel

The Ministry of Foreign Affairs of the Islamic Emirate of Afghanistan (MoFA) (Dari: وزارت خارجه افغانستان, Pashto: د افغانستان د بهرنیو چارو وزارت) is the cabinet ministry responsible for managing the foreign relations of Afghanistan.

On 11 January 2023, the ministry was bombed. It was again bombed on 27 March 2023.

== List of ministers ==
Portrait	Name	Took office	Left office	Political affiliation
	Mirza Ghulam Mohammad Mir Munsi	1907	1917	Independent
	Sardar Mohammad Aziz Khan (Note: Father of Mohammad Daoud Khan and Mohammad Naim Khan.)	1917	1919	Independent
	Mahmud Tarzi	1919	1922	Independent
	Mohammad Wali Khan Darwazi	1922	1924	Independent
	Sardar Shir Ahmad (acting)	1924	1924	Independent
	Mahmud Tarzi	1924	1927	Independent
	Ghulam Siddiq Khan Charkhi (acting)	1927	1927	Independent
	Mohammad Wali Khan Darwazi (acting)	1927	1928	Independent
	Ghulam Siddiq Khan Charkhi	1928	January 1929	Independent
	Ata al-Haqq	January 1929	1929	Saqqawist
	Mohammad Wali Khan Darwazi (acting)	1929	1929	Independent
	Ali Mohammad Khan (acting)	1929	1929	Independent
	Faiz Muhammad Khan Zikeria	1929	1938	Independent
	Ali Mohammad Khan	1938	1953	Independent
	Sultan Ahmed Sherzai	1953	1953	Independent
	Mohammed Naim Khan	1953	1963	Independent
	Mohammad Yusuf (Note: Simultaneously served as Prime Minister of Afghanistan.)	1963	1965	Independent
	Mohammad Nur Ahmad Etemadi (Note: Simultaneously served as Prime Minister of Afghanistan (from 1967).)	1965	1971	Independent
	Mohammad Musa Shafiq (Note: Simultaneously served as Prime Minister of Afghanistan (from 1972).)	1971	1973	Independent
	Mohammad Daoud Khan (Note: Simultaneously served as President of Afghanistan.) (Note: The Deputy Foreign Minister of Afghanistan from 1977-1978 was Abdul Samad Ghaus.)	1973	1977	Republican (from 1974)
	Waheed Abdullah	1977	1978	Republican
	Hafizullah Amin	1978	1979	PDPA–Khalq
	Shah Wali	1979	1979	PDPA–Khalq
	Shah Mohammad Dost	1979	1986	PDPA–Parcham
	Mohammad Abdul Wakil	1986	1992	PDPA–Parcham
	Sayed Solaiman Gilani	1992	1993	
	Hedayat Amin Arsala	1993	1994	Mahaz-e-Milli-ye Islami
	Najibullah Lafraie	1994	1996	Jamiat-e Islami
	Abdul Rahim Ghafoorzai (Note: Served under Northern Alliance.)	1996	21 August 1997 †	Independent
	Sher Mohammad Abbas Stanikzai (acting) (Note: Deputy minister.)	1996	December 1996	Taliban
	Mohammad Ghaus Akhund	1996	June 1997	Taliban
	Mullah Abdul Jalil	June 1997	1998	Taliban
	Hasan Akhund	1998	27 October 1999	Taliban
	Wakil Ahmed Muttawakil (Note: Reportedly tried to warn the U.S. government of the upcoming al-Qaeda September 11 attacks in 2001.)	27 October 1999	October 2001	Taliban
	Abdullah Abdullah	22 December 2001	22 March 2005	Etelaf-e Milli
	Rangin Dadfar Spanta	20 April 2005	18 January 2010	Independent
	Zalmai Rassoul	18 January 2010	28 October 2013	Independent
	Zarar Ahmad Osmani	28 October 2013	12 December 2014	
	Atiqullah Atifmal (acting)	12 December 2014	1 February 2015	
	Salahuddin Rabbani	1 February 2015	23 October 2019	Jamiat-e Islami
	Idrees Zaman (acting)	30 October 2019	22 January 2020	
	Mohammad Haroon Chakhansuri (acting)	22 January 2020	4 April 2020	
	Mohammad Haneef Atmar (Note: Appointed acting minister by President Ashraf Ghani in April 2020, approved by Wolesi Jirga in November 2020 and sworn-in on 4 February 2021.)	4 April 2020	15 August 2021	Hezb-e-Haq-wa-Adalat
	Amir Khan Muttaqi	7 September 2021	15 August 2025	Taliban
	Amir Khan Muttaqi	15 August 2025	Incumbent	Taliban
