= Afghanistan–Syria relations =

Relations between Syria and Afghanistan

- Afghanistan: Syria

Afghanistan–Syria relations describes the diplomatic relations between Afghanistan and Syria. Both of them are Muslim countries and members of the Organization of Islamic Cooperation (OIC).

== History ==
Although both countries were once ruled by the Abbasid Caliphate and are majority Sunni Muslims, relations between the two countries have not been close in modern times due to their distance and ideological differences.

Both countries established diplomatic relations on 18 November 1951 when has been accredited Chargé d'Affaires ad interim of Afghanistan to Syria (Resident in Bagdad) Mr. Mir Amanullah Rahimi.

Afghanistan was invaded by the Soviet Union in 1979, with Ba'athist Syria being a close ally of the USSR at the time, and Afghanistan has since endured a protracted conflict. From 2001 to 2021, the Islamic Republic of Afghanistan, supported by the United States and other Western countries, maintained limited relations with Syria. After the outbreak of the Syrian civil war in 2011, the Assad regime focused on maintaining its own survival, limiting its diplomatic engagement to allies such as Russia and Iran. After the Taliban returned to power in 2021, the Assad regime and the Taliban have no diplomatic relations. The left-wing secular ideology of the Syrian Ba'ath Party and the Islamic fundamentalism of the Afghan Taliban are also very different.

Following a swift military offensive in late 2024, the Islamist group Hay’at Tahrir al-Sham (HTS) seized control of Syria, ending Bashar al-Assad's long-standing rule and ushering in a new government led by Ahmed al-Sharaa (formerly Abu Mohammad al-Jolani), who also heads HTS. Though HTS has officially distanced itself from al-Qaeda since 2016, lingering ties remain, and the group is still designated as a terrorist organization by several Western nations. HTS shares ideological roots with the Taliban, both being Sunni Islamist groups—HTS then-leaning Salafism and the Taliban following Deobandi movement—yet no formal alliance exists. The groups express symbolic mutual support and share common enemies like ISIS, but their strategies remain distinct, with the Taliban largely focused on Afghan national governance under Hibatullah Akhundzada’s leadership. Al-Qaeda’s leadership structure has remained murky since Ayman al-Zawahiri's death, with decentralized factions still operating in various regions. While HTS seeks to portray itself as a Syrian nationalist movement. After the fall of the Assad regime, Afghanistan's ruling Taliban first congratulates Syrian opposition on its victory. Afghan foreign minister Amir Khan Muttaqi expressed hope during a conversation with Asaad al-Shaibani that the two countries could establish regular diplomatic relations.
