= Amir Khan Muttaqi =

Foreign Minister of Afghanistan since 2021 (born 1971)

- امیر خان متقی
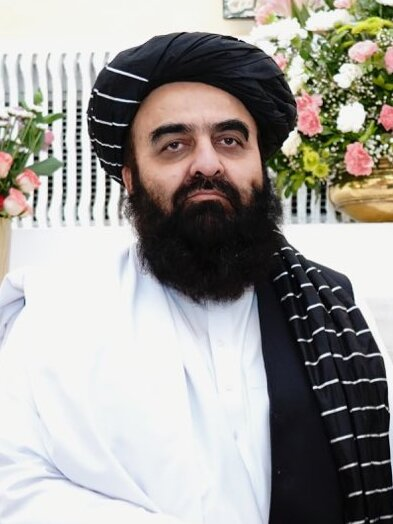
- Muttaqi in 2025

Minister of Foreign Affairs
- Incumbent
- Assumed office 7 September 2021 (Note: Acting: 7 September 2021 – 15 August 2025)
- Supreme Leader: Hibatullah Akhundzada
- Prime Minister: Hasan Akhund
- Deputy: Naeem Wardak
- Preceded by: Haneef Atmar

Member of the Leadership Council
- Incumbent
- Assumed office 15 August 2021
- In exile May 2002 – 15 August 2021

Minister of Education and Minister of Information and Culture
- In office c. 1996 – c. 2001
- Leader: Mullah Omar
- Succeeded by: Noorullah Munir (2021)

Personal details
- Born: 26 February 1971 (age 55) Nad Ali, Helmand, Afghanistan
- Occupation: Politician; Taliban member
- Political affiliation: Taliban

Amir Khan Muttaqi (Pashto: امیر خان متقی [ˈamɪr xɑn mʊtaˈqi]; born 26 February 1971) is an Afghan Taliban politician serving as the minister of foreign affairs of the Islamic Emirate of Afghanistan since 2021. He was also a member of the Taliban negotiation team in the Qatar office.

== Early life and education ==
Khan was born on 26 February 1971 in Zarghoon village of Nad Ali District, in Helmand Province. His family originates from Paktia Province, and Khan initially received his primary education in a local school and mosque. Due to the communist Saur Revolution, he had to move with his family to neighboring Pakistan, where he was enrolled in a refugees' madrasa and studied subjects such as Arabic grammar, logic, rhetoric, jurisprudence, hadith and Tafsir.

He continued his higher Islamic studies at the Darul Uloom Haqqania, a seminary in Pakistan's Khyber Pakhtunkhwa province from which many other influential Taliban members graduated.

He reportedly lived in Banaras Colony in Karachi, Pakistan during his stay and still has properties, real estate and many other business interests in Pakistan.

== Political career ==
=== Afghan Jihad ===
He was initially part of Maulvi Mohammad Nabi Mohammadi's group during the Afghan jihad but later joined the Taliban movement when it emerged.

=== Different Taliban high positions (1999–2021) ===
He has held a series of senior positions within the Taliban movement. In 1999, he served as a member of the Taliban High Council and was also placed in charge of Kandahar Radio. That same year he became Chief of Staff of the Ministry of Foreign Affairs. Khan served as Minister of Information and Culture and as a representative of the 1996–2001 Taliban government in United Nations-led talks. During that time, a pro-Taliban source says that his "innovative activities" led to "a systematic jihadist publication apparatus against the enemy's widespread media aggression."

On 17 August 2021, just after the fall of Kabul to the Taliban, he was reported to be in Kabul talking to non-Taliban politicians such as Abdullah Abdullah and Hamid Karzai about forming a government. Taliban forces took control of Afghanistan's capital city of Kabul on 15 August 2021 during a military offensive against the Afghan government that had begun in May 2021.

=== Minister of Foreign Affairs (2021–present) ===
On 7 September 2021, the Taliban announced the first members of a new "acting" government, three weeks after coming to full power with the takeover of Kabul on 15 August. Amir Khan Muttaqi was appointed as Afghanistan's acting foreign minister. Muttaqi was reappointed on a permanent basis with the rest of the cabinet on 15 August 2025.

In December 2021, Amir Khan Muttaqi attended a session of the Organisation of Islamic Cooperation Council of foreign ministers as Afghanistan delegate. The session was attended by delegations from 57 nations with China, Russia, and the United States as guest delegations. Amir Khan discussed with Pakistan prime minister, Imran Khan, regarding the threat of ISIS in the Afghanistan–Pakistan border region.

==== Visit to Darul Uloom Deoband ====
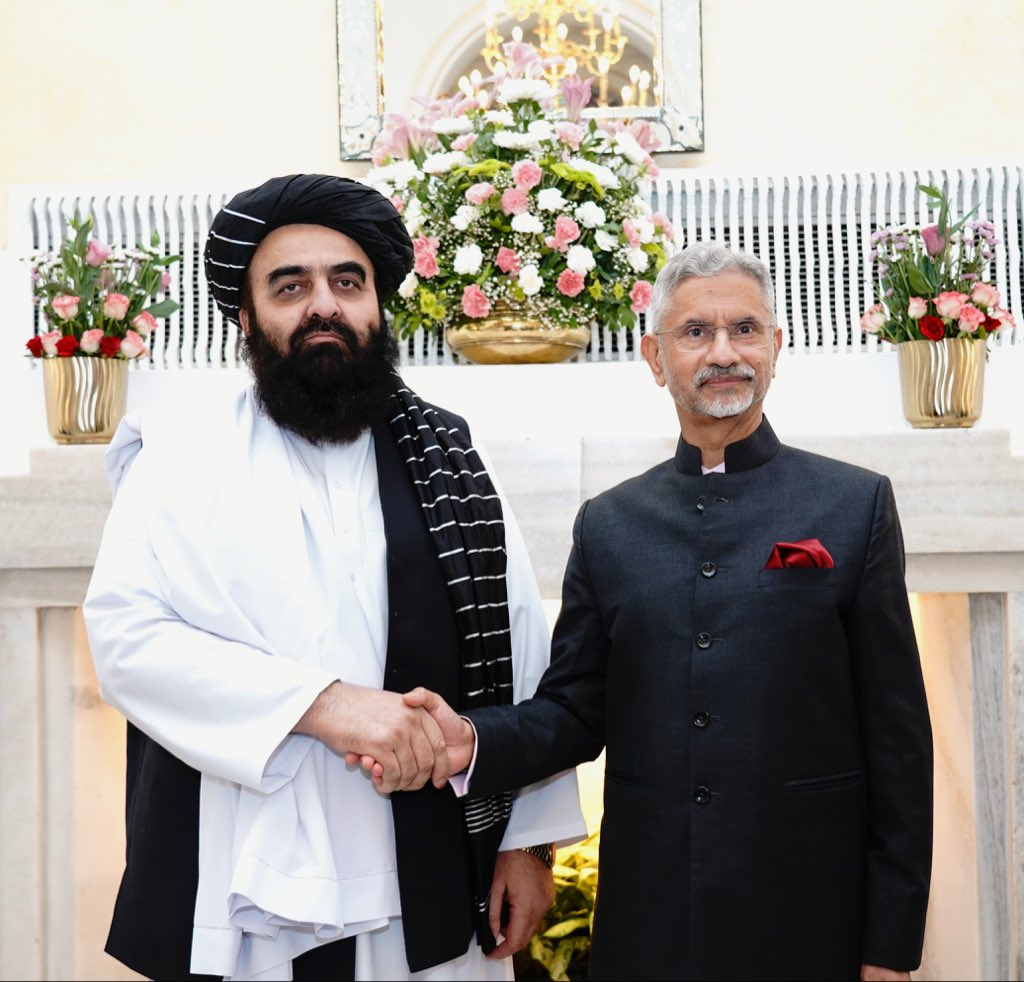
Muttaqi with Indian minister of External Affairs S. Jaishankar in New Delhi, India, 9 October 2025

On 11 October 2025, Muttaqi visited the Islamic seminary Darul Uloom Deoband, located in Saharanpur district of Uttar Pradesh, India. The visit was part of his first diplomatic trip to India.

Muttaqi held discussions with senior scholars and students of the Deobandi seminary, and expressed hopes for strengthening ties between India and Afghanistan. Muttaqi was conferred the honorary title of Qasmi and was presented with a certificate granting him the Sanad-e-Hadith (authorization to teach Hadith). A public event was initially planned, but it was cancelled due to security and crowd management concerns.

== Writings ==
In 2004 he wrote a book which was banned by the Taliban leadership, which thought some of its information could not be aired publicly.
