= Dalibor Povolný =

Czech zoologist and entomologist (1924–2004)

- Born: 13 November 1924; Třebíč, Czechoslovakia
- Died: 6 November 2004 (aged 79); Brno, Czech Republic
- Resting place: Židenice Cemetery, Brno
- Education: Mendel University in Brno
- Known for: Research on moths and flesh flies; description of more than 250 insect species
- Awards: Minister of the Environment Award (2002); honorary doctorate from Mendel University in Brno (2004)
- Scientific career
- Fields: Zoology, entomology, ecology
- Workplaces: Mendel University in Brno; Czechoslovak Academy of Sciences; Nangarhar University

Dalibor Povolný (13 November 1924 – 6 November 2004) was a Czech zoologist and entomologist who specialised in applied and systematic entomology. He described and discovered more than 250 insect species, concentrating particularly on twirler moths and flesh flies. He published more than 350 scientific papers.

== Biography ==
Povolný was born in Třebíč on 13 November 1924. He studied operatic singing at the Brno Conservatory before graduating in 1949 from the Faculty of Agronomy at the University of Agriculture in Brno, now Mendel University in Brno.

Between 1947 and 1953, he worked as an assistant at the university's Institute of Applied Entomology. From 1953 to 1962, he worked at the Entomological Institute of the Czechoslovak Academy of Sciences. He subsequently headed the university's Department of Zoology from 1962 to 1970.

Between 1965 and 1969, Povolný served as a professor and head of the Department of Parasitology at Nangarhar University in Jalalabad, Afghanistan. His appointment was associated with two entomological expeditions to the country.

In 1976, he was prohibited from teaching and transferred to an outpost of the university in Lednice. In 1985, he was transferred to Brno as an independent research scientist without permission to teach. He was forced into retirement in 1988. Following the political changes of 1989, he served as vice-rector of the University of Agriculture in Brno from 1990 to 1991.

During the final years of the German occupation of Czechoslovakia, Povolný was subjected to forced labour in 1944 and 1945. He was expelled from the Communist Party of Czechoslovakia and subsequently faced political persecution. In 1975, he was sentenced to ten months in prison; he was granted an amnesty in 1976.

== Scientific work and recognition ==
Povolný's research focused on applied and systematic entomology, particularly the taxonomy and biology of twirler moths (Gelechiidae) and flesh flies (Sarcophagidae). He described and discovered more than 250 insect species and authored over 350 scientific publications.

In 1991, the Professor Povolný Foundation for Research in Ecology (Nadace profesora Povolného pro výzkumnou činnost v oblasti ekologie) was established to support promising postgraduate students in entomology and ecology. Povolný contributed funds to provide awards to selected students.

In the 1990s, he received the City of Brno Award for his lifetime achievements. In 2002, he was awarded the Minister of the Environment Award for his lifetime of professional work and popularisation of the natural sciences.

In October 2004, Povolný received an honorary doctorate from Mendel University in Brno. He also received the Knight's Medal of the city of Palermo.

Povolný spoke German and English fluently.

== Personal life ==
Povolný was married to Drahomíra Povolná, who studied agronomy by correspondence at the University of Agriculture in Brno. They had two children, Vladimír and Drahomíra.
