= Naeem Wardak =

Afghan diplomat

- ډاکټر محمد نعیم وردک

Deputy Minister of Foreign Affairs
- Incumbent
- Assumed office 27 January 2025 (Note: Acting: 27 January 2025 – 15 August 2025)
- Supreme Leader: Hibatullah Akhundzada
- Minister: Amir Khan Muttaqi (acting)
- Preceded by: Sher Mohammad Abbas Stanikzai

First Secretary of the Afghan Embassy in Qatar
- In office October 2021 – 27 January 2025
- Preceded by: Abdul Hakim Dalili (as ambassador)
- Succeeded by: Suhail Shaheen

Personal details
- Born: Mohammad Naeem Wardak; 1985 (age 40–41) Chak District, Wardak Province, Afghanistan
- Party: (Afghanistan) Taliban
- Education: Nangarhar University; International Islamic University, Islamabad; Darul Uloom Haqqania

Mohammad Naeem Wardak (Pashto: ډاکټر محمد نعیم وردک; born 1985) is a senior member of the Afghan Taliban and the country's Deputy Minister of Foreign Affairs. He also previously served as head of the Afghan Embassy in Qatar from 2021 to 2025 and the spokesman of the Taliban's Political Office from 2020 to 2025, in the same position from 2013 to 2015.

== Early life and education ==
Wardak belongs to Chak District of Wardak Province. He received his early education at a local madrassa in the village of Chak, then enrolled at Nangarhar University in Jalalabad and obtained a BA degree. He then enrolled at the International Islamic University, Islamabad, Pakistan for his master's degree and later did his Ph.D. in Arabic. He also studied for a short time at Darul Uloom Haqqania, Akora Khattak, also in Pakistan, from where he studied Hadith and Fiqh. Wardak is the first Taliban leader to hold a PhD.

== Career ==
When the Taliban's first political office opened in Qatar in 2013, he was appointed spokesperson. Wardak and Suhail Shaheen both acted as spokespersons at the same time and served until 2015. In 2018 he was made part of the Qatar office again and has been based there ever since. In September 2020, he was re-appointed spokesman for the Taliban's political office in Doha.

After the Taliban took control of Afghanistan, Wardak was nominated to serve as Ambassador to Qatar in October 2021. He was allowed to take over the embassy as First Secretary, but has not received diplomatic accreditation from Qatar.

In January 2025, he was appointed as the acting Deputy Minister of Foreign Affairs after the Taliban leadership removed Sher Mohammad Abbas Stanikzai from his post.

== See also ==
- Taliban activities in Qatar
