= Tayyab Agha =

Afghan politician and Taliban leader

Sayyid Muhammad Tayyab Agha (Pashto: سید محمد طیب آغا, Sayyid Muḥammad Ṭayyab Āghā; born 1976) is a prominent figure in the Afghan Taliban. He was the head of the political wing of the Taliban from 2009 to 2015 and was the aide and representative of Taliban founder Mohammed Omar. During the Taliban government of the Islamic Emirate of Afghanistan (1996–2001), he served as chief of staff to Omar, as well as his personal secretary, translator, and press spokesman.

== Biography ==
Agha was born in 1976 in Jelahor village, Arghandab District, Kandahar Province, and belongs to a prominent Persian-speaking religious family from a Sayyid tribe. He speaks English, Arabic, Urdu, and Persian, in addition to Pashto.

In early 2010 Agha met Bernd Mützelburg, Germany's special envoy to Afghanistan, at a location in the Persian Gulf region. In November that year he and two close associates met United States Department of State diplomats and US intelligence officials in Munich. He was concerned he could be arrested en route and interned at Guantanamo Bay detention camp, so he was fetched from the Persian Gulf in an airplane of Germany's Federal Intelligence Service, and U.S. National Security Council staff avoided telling the Central Intelligence Agency about the flight.

He moved to Doha, Qatar, in January 2012 to form the Taliban's political office there. On 3 August 2015, following the delayed acknowledgement of the death of Omar, and the appointment of Akhtar Mansour as leader of the Taliban, Agha resigned as head of the political office. He questioned the way in which Mansour was appointed, suggesting that it was driven by people who were living outside Afghanistan. He was also critical of Omar's death being kept secret for nearly two years. He said he was stepping down to avoid "expected future disputes". He was succeeded by Sher Mohammad Abbas Stanekzai, a former anti-Soviet fighter and deputy health minister.

Agha's opinion on how the Taliban should change its approach was published in October 2016 by Radio Free Europe/Radio Liberty, who described him as "a key Taliban ideologue". He thought the Taliban should drop the name "Islamic Emirate of Afghanistan" and call themselves a "movement", as they could not be considered a shadow government when they controlled only rural territory and most of the leadership were living in a foreign country, i.e., Pakistan. Agha called for independence from foreign influence, saying the leadership should leave Pakistan, and calling for the removal of those who were in contact with Pakistani, Iranian, Indian or other foreign intelligence services. He also called for restrictions on Al-Qaeda and other foreign jihadists within Afghanistan, referring to Central Asian jihadists whom the Taliban fought in Zabul in 2015 after they joined ISIS, and how the activities of Al-Qaeda led to the fall of the Taliban regime.
