= Mullah Yaqoob =

Afghan Taliban warlord (born 1990)

Mawlawi; Mullah; Mohammad Yaqoob Mujahid
- ملا یعقوب
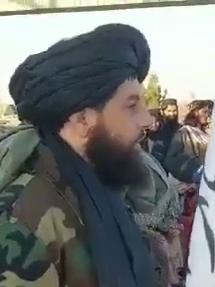
- Yaqoob in 2022

Minister of Defense
- Incumbent
- Assumed office 7 September 2021 (Note: Acting: 7 September 2021 – 15 August 2025)
- Supreme Leader: Hibatullah Akhundzada
- Prime Minister: Hasan Akhund
- Deputy: Mohammad Fazl; Abdul Qayyum Zakir
- Preceded by: Bismillah Khan Mohammadi

Second Deputy Leader of Afghanistan
- Incumbent
- Assumed office 15 August 2021 Serving with Sirajuddin Haqqani and Abdul Ghani Baradar
- Supreme Leader: Hibatullah Akhundzada
- Preceded by: Sarwar Danish (as Second Vice President)
- In exile 25 May 2016 – 15 August 2021
- Preceded by: Sirajuddin Haqqani
- Deputy: Ibrahim Sadr
- Preceded by: Ibrahim Sadr

Personal details
- Born: 1990 (age 35–36)
- Parent: Mullah Omar (father)
- Ethnicity: Ghilji Pashtun
- Religion: Sunni Islam
- Political affiliation: Taliban

Military service
- Allegiance: Taliban; Islamic Emirate of Afghanistan (2021–present)
- Branch/service: Military Affairs Commission (2016–2021); Afghan Armed Forces (2021–present)
- Rank: General
- Commands: Southwestern Zone (2016–2020); Military Affairs Commission (2020–2021); Afghan Armed Forces (2021–present)
- Battles/wars: War in Afghanistan (2001–2021): 2021 Taliban offensive; 2026 Afghanistan–Pakistan war Afghanistan–Tajikistan border skirmishes

Muhammad Yaqoob Mujahid Tumzi (Note: Pashto: محمد یعقوب مجاهد تومزی, romanized: Muḥammad Yaʿqūb Mujāhid Tūmzī) (born 1990), commonly known as Mullah Yaqoob, (Note: Pashto: ملا یعقوب, romanized: Mulla Yaʿqūb) is an Afghan military leader and cleric who is serving as the second deputy leader of Afghanistan and the defense minister since 2021. He has been a deputy leader of the Taliban since 2016, and was additionally appointed to his ministerial role after the Taliban's victory over Western-backed forces in the 2001–2021 war. He has been the Taliban's military chief since 2020.

== Biography ==
Mullah Yaqoob is an ethnic Pashtun of the Tumzi clan of the Hotak tribe, which is part of the larger Ghilji branch. He is the eldest son of the late Taliban founder Mullah Omar. He received his religious education in various seminaries in Karachi, Pakistan.

When his father died in April 2013 and rumors escalated that he had been assassinated by rival Akhtar Mansour, Yaqoob denied the rumor, insisting that his father had died of natural causes.

=== Leadership positions ===
In 2016, Yaqoob was assigned by the Taliban to be in charge of the military commission in 15 of Afghanistan's 34 provinces. The military commission, then headed by Ibrahim Sadr, is responsible for overseeing all military affairs of the Taliban. In addition, Yaqoob was included in the Taliban's top decision-making council, the Rehbari Shura.

Mansour's death was announced on 21 May 2016 and he was replaced by Hibatullah Akhundzada as the Taliban leader. Sirajuddin Haqqani, a deputy to Mansour and leader of the Haqqani network, retained his position as Taliban deputy leader to Akhundzada, and Yaqoob was appointed the second deputy to the Taliban chief.

==== COVID-19 pandemic ====
On 7 May 2020, he was appointed head of the Taliban military commission, replacing Sadr and making Yaqoob the insurgents' military chief. On 29 May 2020, influential senior Taliban commander Mualana Muhammad Ali Jan Ahmed told Foreign Policy that Yaqoob became the acting leader to the entire Taliban after Akhundzada and First Deputy Leader Sirajuddin Haqqani became ill with COVID-19 during the COVID-19 pandemic in Afghanistan, stating "Our hero, the son of our great leader, Mullah Yaqoob, is running the entire Taliban operation in Haibatullah's absence."

=== Provisional Taliban government ===
Yaqoob is the defense minister of Afghanistan, appointed on 7 September 2021 in an acting capacity, and reappointed to the position on a permanent basis on 15 August 2025, with the rest of the cabinet.

In December 2022, Yaqoob met with UAE President Mohamed bin Zayed Al Nahyan in Abu Dhabi. They discussed strengthening of relations between the UAE and Afghanistan. On 4 March 2024, Yaqoob attended the DIMIDEX (Doha International Maritime Defence Exhibition and Conference) 2024 exhibition in Qatar, where various international companies displayed land, air and naval military equipment and vehicles such as the LY-70 air defense missile system, ZTD-05 assault vehicle, HJ-12 anti-tank missile and more to the Taliban.

== Views ==
Mohammed Yaqoob supported a negotiated settlement to the War in Afghanistan. A supporter of former leader of the Taliban Akhtar Mansour, Yaqoob is pro-Saudi, has a reputation as a peace-advocating moderate, and is believed to have ties with the former government of Afghanistan. He also believes that the enforcement of Sharia should co-exist with basic international norms.

== Notes ==
Political offices
Preceded by Sarwar Danish (2021) as Second Vice President; Sirajuddin Haqqani (2016)	Second Deputy Leader of Afghanistan; 2021–present In exile 2016–2021	Incumbent
Preceded by Ibrahim Sadr	Head of the Military Commission; 2021–present In exile 2020–2021	Incumbent
Preceded by Bismillah Khan Mohammadi	Defense Minister of Afghanistan; 2021–present Acting: 2021–2025	Incumbent
