= Atiqullah Atifmal =

Afghan politician

Afghan Ambassador to Malaysia
- In office November 29, 2015 – October 3, 2019
- President: Ashraf Ghani
- Preceded by: Dr Jamrad Jamshid
- Succeeded by: Dr Moheb Rahman Spinghar

Minister of Foreign Affairs(Acting)
- In office December, 2014 – February, 2015
- President: Ashraf Ghani
- Preceded by: Zarar Ahmad Moqbel Osmani
- Succeeded by: Salahuddin Rabbani

Deputy Foreign Minister for Administrative Affairs
- In office March, 2014 – November, 2015
- President: Hamid Karzai
- Preceded by: Abdul H. Haider
- Succeeded by: Nasir Ahmad Andisha

Personal details
- Born: January 27, 1957 Logar, Afghanistan

Atiqullah Atifmal (Pashto: عتیق الله عاطفمل; born 27 January 1957) is an Afghan politician. He is the Chief of Protocol to the Afghan President Dr. Ashraf Ghani. He served as Foreign Minister of Afghanistan(Acting) (2014–2015). He accompanied Afghan President Hamid Karzai on all official visits since the establishment of the Interim Administration as the Chief of Protocol until 2004.

== Early life and education ==
Atifmal was born to the ethnic tribe of Stanikzai of Logar Province in Afghanistan. His father's name was Rahmatullah Stanikzai. He received his bachelor's degree in literature and humanitarian science from Kabul University in 1978. He taught English as a second language at Kabul University in 1979–1981. He also obtained a diploma in Philosophy from Moscow State University and a diploma from the Institute of Diplomacy of Afghanistan Foreign Ministry in 1983. He attended the master's degree program in Public Administration at California State University in 2007.

== Career ==
Throughout his career, Atifmal has held many major positions in the Afghan Government, including:

- Second Secretary of Afghan Embassy in Paris, France (1986–1989)
- Deputy Chief of Protocol of Afghan Foreign Ministry (1991–1994)
- Chief of Protocol of President Hamid Karzai (2001–2004)
- Consul General of Afghanistan in California (2004–2008)
- Deputy Director General of fifth Political Department of the Afghan Foreign Ministry (2008–2009)
- Director General of parliamentary affairs division of Afghan Foreign Ministry (2009–2011)
- Consul General of Afghanistan in Dubai, United Arab Emirates (2011–2013)
- Deputy Foreign Minister for Finance and Administration of Afghanistan(2014-2016).

=== Special Programme for the Economies of Central Asia ===
Improving connectivity between Afghanistan and Central Asia was the focus of discussions at the 2014 Economic Forum of the United Nations Special Programme for the Economies of Central Asia (SPECA) held in Ashgabat on 4 December 2014 in the light of the Afghan chairmanship of SPECA during 2014 and the beginning of Afghanistan’s Transformation Decade. Atifmal, in his role as Deputy Foreign Minister of Afghanistan, emphasized that Afghanistan and Central Asia were linked by shared challenges and opportunities and needed to join forces in order to combat religious extremism, terrorism and organized crime. Regional cooperation, by providing a strong impetus to economic development addresses the root causes of these evils. All SPECA countries, being either land-locked or double land-locked, share an interest in improving regional connectivity.

== Medals Of Service ==
Atifmal was awarded a Medal of Excellence Services in 2002 and a Certificate of appreciation in 2004, 2012 and 2013 from the government of Afghanistan.

== Personal life ==
Atifmal is married and has five children: four sons and one daughter. He has said multiple times he wishes to keep his life private in case of a conflict of interest.
