= Nangarhar University =

University in Jalalabad, Afghanistan

- پوهنتون ننگرهار / د ننګرهار پوهنتون
- Type: Public
- Chancellor: Sheikh Inamullah Madani
- Vice-Chancellor: Ehsanullah Naseh
- Academic staff: 600
- Students: 16,000
- Location: Jalalabad, Nangarhar Province, Afghanistan; 34°28′21″N 70°22′9″E
- Website: nu.edu.af

Nangarhar University (Pashto: د ننګرهار پوهنتون; Dari: پوهنتون ننگرهار) is the largest public university in Jalalabad, which is the capital of Nangarhar Province in eastern Afghanistan. The university is under the control of the Ministry of Higher Education, which is headquartered in Kabul. Its current chancellor is Sheikh Inamullah Madani. His predecessor was Dr. Khalil Ahmad Mahmoud Behsudwal.

Nangarhar University is one of the oldest and the second largest university in Afghanistan. It has 13 colleges and 15,385 students. The university was established in 1963 as a medical college. It was later merged with other local colleges to become a full-fledged university. It now houses faculties in agriculture, engineering, literature, economic, medicine, theology, pedagogy, public administration and policy, political science and veterinary medicine.

== Faculties ==
Nangarhar University consists of faculties that include Medical, Education, Economics, Engineering, Political Science, Public Administration and Policy, Veterinary, Computer science, Islamic Studies (Sharya), Agriculture, Journalism, Science, and Languages and Literature.

Students can take part in an e-learning program organized by Afghans Next Generation e-Learning.

1. Nangarhar Medical Faculty
2. Education Faculty
3. Economics Faculty
4. Engineering Faculty
5. Political Science Faculty
6. Public Administration and Policy Faculty
7. Veterinary Science Faculty
8. Computer Science Faculty
9. Science Faculty
10. Languages and Literature Faculty
11. Sharia (Islamic Studies) Faculty
12. Journalism and Mass Communication Faculty
13. Agriculture Faculty

=== Faculty of Economics ===
The Faculty was established in 1984 under the administration of Nangarhar University. There are four Departments in this Faculty consist of:

1. Economics
2. Commerce
3. Business Administration
4. Finance and Banking

Moreover, this Faculty has the program of Master of Business Administration (MBA) and as well as night shift of BBA and Economics.

The Dean of the Faculty is Senior TA Mohammad Sadiq Rehnama.

The Faculty Members of Economics Faculty are:

1. Associate professor Hamdullah Nezami
2. Assistant Professor Naeem Jan Sarwari
3. Senior TA. Shah Mahmood Afghan
4. Senior TA. Mohammad Sadiq Rehnama
5. Senior TA. Safiullah Khalilzai
6. Senior TA. Naqeebullah Atal
7. Senior TA. Abdul Rahman Dard
8. TA. Hanifullah Khatir
9. TA. Kifayatullah Fazli
10. TA. Iftikharullah Fakhar
11. TA. Misbahuddin Noori
12. TA. Mohammad Ibrahim Azimi
13. TA. Shafiullah Sultanzai
14. TA. Hoshmand Habibi
15. TA. Wahid Safi
16. TA. Abdul Khabir
17. TA. Matiullah Subhani

=== Faculty of Languages and Literature ===
The Faculty of Languages and Literature was established in 1984 but only the Pashto Department was available at that time, with six lecturers. Later on, the Russian Department was established but it was soon closed due to lack fo students. The Arabic Department was established in 1993. From 1992 there were changes in the curriculum of the Pashto Department such as the addition of English and Islamic subjects instead of Russian Language, Academic sociology and Political economics in addition to Pashto and English departments.

- The Dari Department was established in 2003.
- The Hindi Department was established in 2006.
- The German Department was established in 2014.
- The Master program in Pashto language was launched in 2014.

After adding Arabic, English, Dari and Hindi departments the name of the faculty was changed to the Faculty of Languages and Literature. In 2015 the faculty had 1,494 students studying in all six departments, 1,403 were male students and 91 females. There are 54 permanent professional lecturers.

The aim of this faculty is:

- To provide professionals in national and foreign languages to bring better communication to Afghanistan.
- To introduce Afghan cultural values into language learning.
- To provide academic seminars and conferences.
- To provide the facility of a master's degree in every department.
- To publish a historical and literary magazine.

== Notable alumni ==
- Mohammad Amin Fatemi - physician, politician and former ambassador, graduated in 1977.
- Mohammad Naeem Wardak - acting Deputy Minister of Foreign Affairs, obtained B.A. degree.
- Dr. Mohammad Hussain Yar - graduated 1973 - (1942-2012) - medical doctor and professor of anatomy - Nangarhar Medical Faculty
- Dr. Ahmad Siar Ahmadi - medical doctor, professor of pediatrics - Nangarhar Medical Faculty
- Dr. Mohammad Tahir Khan - Health and Well-being Coordinator - Toronto - Canada
- Dagarwal Dr. Muhammed Kabir Sadiqi - medical doctor, Chief of Medicine at Kandahar Air Field hospital from 1982 to 1985, Bagram Airfield Hospital from 1985 to 1990, and Kabul International Airport Hospital from 1990 to August 12, 1992. Died during the civil war on August 12, 1992.
- Fahim Rahimi - graduated 2011 - Professor of English, Faculty of Languages and Literature, Fulbright FLTA 2013-14 Fayetteville State University, North Carolina, USA.
- Humayoon Gardiwal - graduated 2003 - Master of Sciences in Public Health, University of Indonesia, Leadership Development for Health Consultant, Ministry of Public Health.
- Khalid Sulayman - graduated 2009 - Masters in Arabic

== See also ==
- List of universities in Afghanistan
