= Sher Mohammad Abbas Stanikzai =

Afghan politician and Taliban government minister

Personal details
- Education: University of Kabul; Indian Military Academy
- Occupation: Politician, Taliban member

Sher Mohammad Abbas Stanikzai (Pashto: (Note: Pashto pronunciation: [ʃeɾ mu.wa.mad̪ ʔa.bɑs st̪ɑ.nik.zaɪ, ʃeɾ mu.ham.mad̪ ʔab.bɑs st̪ɑ.nik.zaɪ]) شېر محمد عباس ستانکزی; Dari: (Note: Dari pronunciation: [ʃeːɾ mʊ.wäm.mád̪ ʔäb.bɑ́ːs ʔɪs.t̪ʰɑː.nɪkʰ.záj, ʃeːɾ mo̞.ɦäm.mád̪ ʔäb.bɑ́ːs ʔɪs.t̪ʰɑː.nɪkʰ.záj]) شير محمد عباس ستانکزی, born 1963) is an Afghan politician, a senior member of the Afghan Taliban and the country's Deputy Minister of Foreign Affairs from 7 September 2021 to 27 January 2025.

He is ethnically Pashtun and comes from the Stanikzai tribe. (Note: A subtribe of the Pashtun Ghilji tribe.) He was an officer in the Afghan Army after training at Indian Military Academy. He defected from the army and joined Islamic movements to fight the Soviets in Afghanistan. He was a deputy cabinet minister in the first Taliban government. He has been a senior member of the Taliban's political office in Doha since it was set up in 2012, and was its head from 2015 to 2020. On 7 September 2021, Sher Abbas was appointed as the Deputy Minister of Foreign Affairs. On 18 January 2025, he gave a speech in favor of girls' education and women's rights. On 27 January 2025, Afghanistan International reported that he had left Afghanistan after Taliban leader Hibatullah Akhundzada issued an exit ban and arrest warrant against him.

He speaks English, Urdu, Pashto, and Dari and has travelled widely to other countries as a Taliban political representative.

== Biography and early life ==
Stanikzai was born in 1963 in the Abbas Qala area in the Shah Mazar area of the Baraki Barak District, in the Logar Province of Afghanistan. He is the son of Pacha Khan and is an ethnic Pashtun of the Stanikzai subtribe. He studied political science in Afghanistan, gaining a master's degree. He can speak English, Urdu, Pashto, and Dari.

He trained as a soldier at the Army Cadet College of the Indian Army at Nowgaon in India for three years from 1979 to 1982 under an Indo-Afghan cooperation programme. He was also an officer cadet for a year and a half with the Keren Company of the Bhagat Battalion at the Indian Military Academy in Dehradun, one of 45 foreign cadets in the Keren Company. The Indian Military Academy trained cadets from a number of other countries in Asia and Africa. His fellow cadets nicknamed him "Sheru". After graduating he was a lieutenant in the Afghan Army.

== Taliban political representative (2001–2021) ==
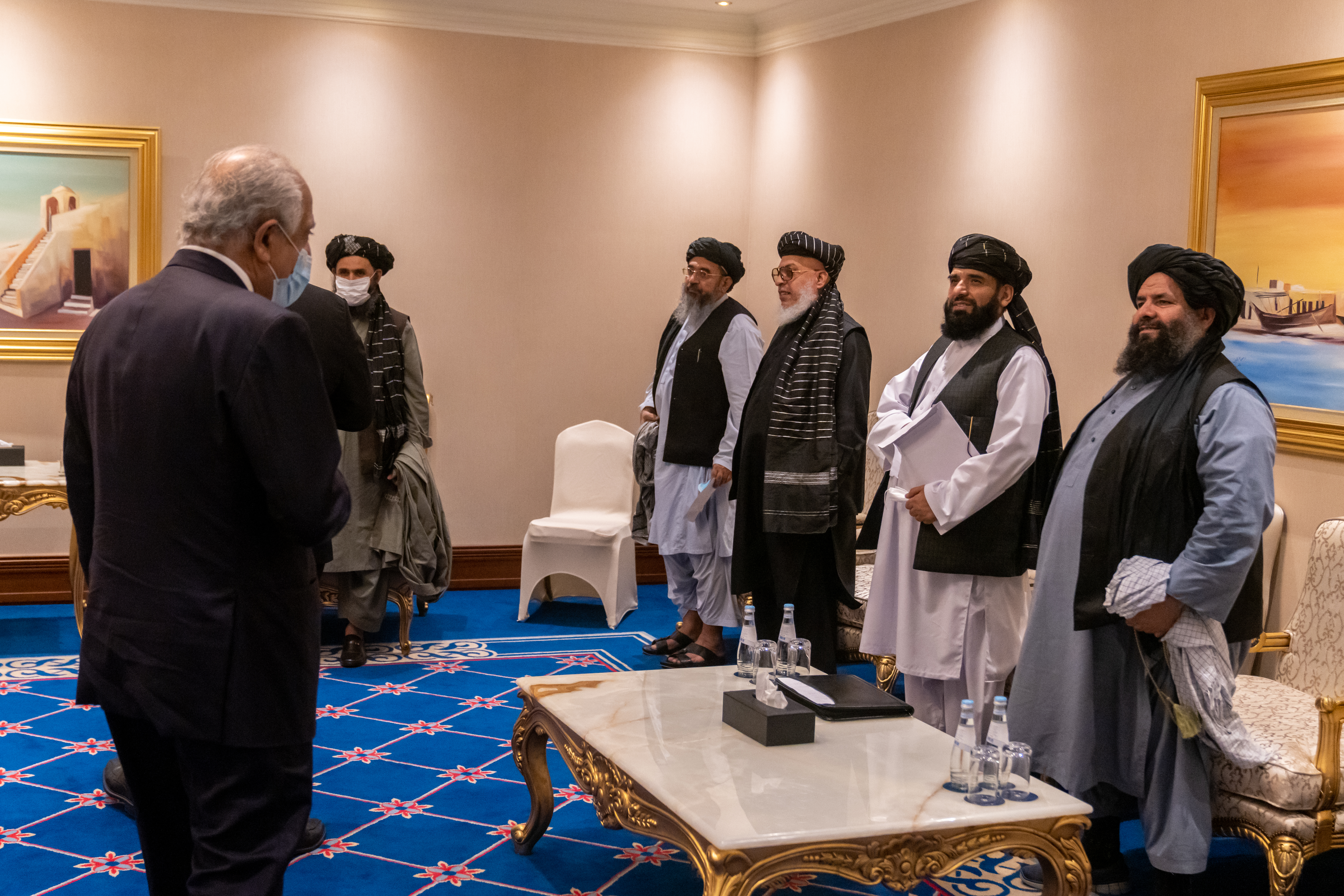
Sher Mohammad Abbas Stanikzai (third from right) meeting US representative Zalmay Khalilzad (left) and Secretary of State Mike Pompeo (obscured), Doha, Qatar on 21 November 2020

Stanikzai arrived in Qatar with Tayyab Agha and others in January 2012 to facilitate the opening of the Taliban's political office in that country. On 6 August 2015 he was appointed acting head of the political office, replacing Agha, who had resigned. After his appointment, Stanikzai pledged his allegiance to Akhtar Mansour, saying "I and other members of the Political Office of the Islamic Emirate declare allegiance to the honorable Mullah Akhtar Mansoor." He was confirmed in his position as head of the political office in November 2015.

From 18–22 July 2016, he traveled to China for talks with Chinese officials. In February 2017, Stanikzai was denied entry to the United Arab Emirates. In August 2023, Stanikzai further emphasized the importance of education for women. He remarked: "Justice should be ensured. The government should reopen the doors of the schools for everyone. The government should have a constitution and run its affairs based on it. The people should give consultations to the government officials". Following this, he also stated: "Women should take part in various parts of the society based on Sharia. We want freedom for women based on Sharia, not based on Western culture. The rights of girls should be provided completely and the ground for work and education for women be provided".

In January 2025, after Abbas Stanekzai harshly criticised Taliban leader Hibatullah Akhundzada for banning girls' education, Akhundzada ordered Abdul Haq Wasiq, the head of intelligence, to arrest Stanekzai and ban him from leaving the country. According to sources from Afghanistan International, Mullah Yaqoob, Taliban defence minister, provided the conditions for his immediate visit to Dubai. The Taliban also ordered Mohammad Naeem Wardak, the former representative to Qatar, to take over his post.
