= Hasan Akhund =

Prime Minister of Afghanistan since 2021

Mullah Hasan Akhund
- حسن آخوند
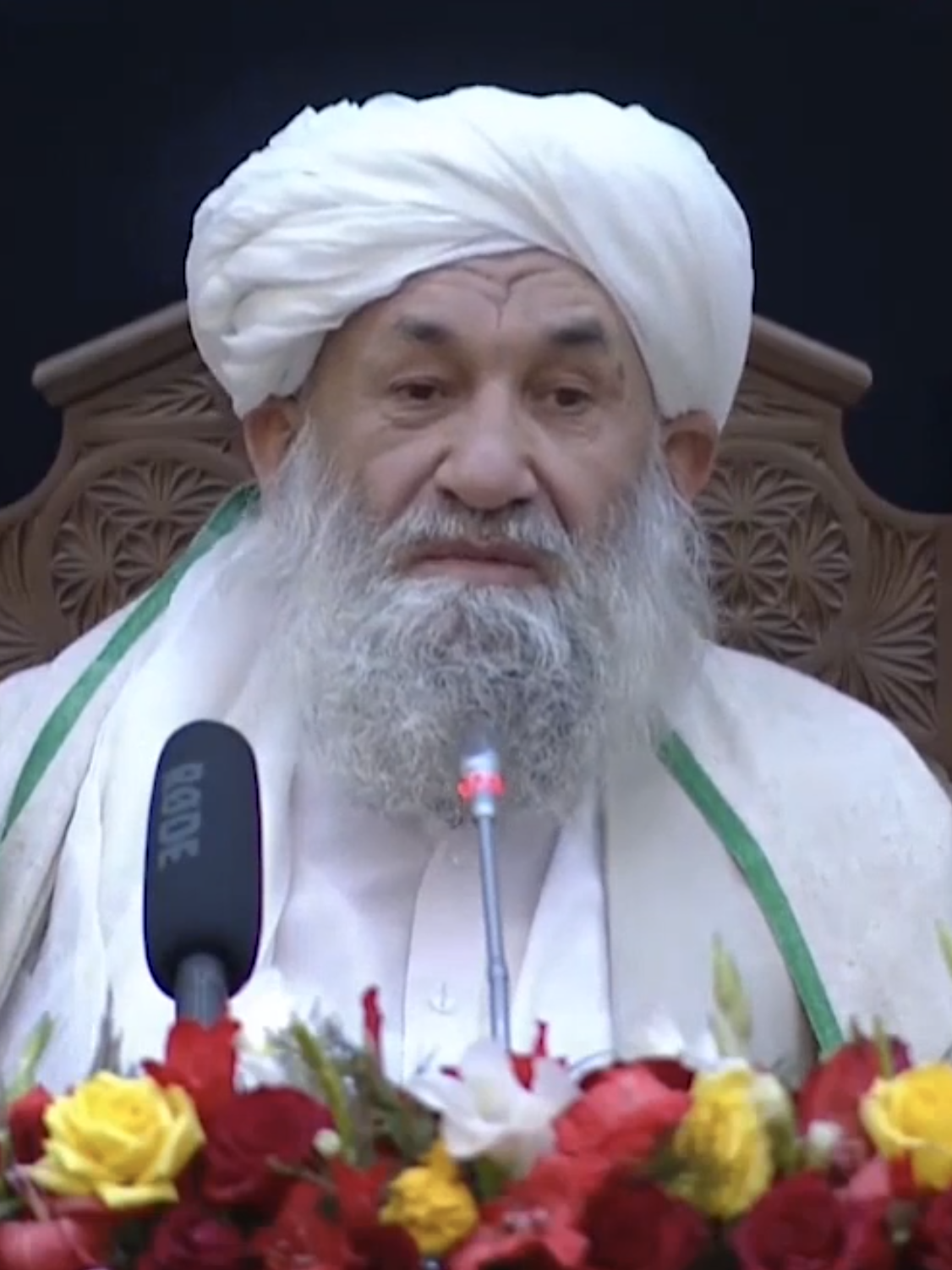
- Akhund in 2022

27th Prime Minister of Afghanistan
- Incumbent
- Assumed office 7 September 2021 (Note: Acting: 7 September 2021 – 15 August 2025) (Note: Deputy Abdul Kabir served as acting prime minister pro tempore from 17 May to 17 July 2023 while Hasan Akhund was recovering from an illness.)
- Supreme Leader: Hibatullah Akhundzada
- Deputy: Abdul Ghani Baradar; Abdul Salam Hanafi; Abdul Kabir (acting)
- Preceded by: Office re-established; Abdul Kabir (acting, 2001)

Member of the Leadership Council
- Incumbent
- Assumed office 15 August 2021
- In exile May 2002 – 15 August 2021

Deputy Prime Minister of Afghanistan
- In office 27 September 1996 – 13 November 2001
- Prime Minister: Mohammad Rabbani; Abdul Kabir (acting)
- Preceded by: Office established
- Succeeded by: Abdul Ghani Baradar (2021); Abdul Salam Hanafi (2021)

Minister of Foreign Affairs
- In office 1998 – 27 October 1999
- Prime Minister: Mohammad Rabbani
- Preceded by: Abdul Jalil
- Succeeded by: Wakil Ahmed Muttawakil

Personal details
- Born: Muhammad Hasan Akhund Kakar c. 1945 – c. 1958 (age 67–81) Pashmul, Panjwayi District (now in Zhari District), Kandahar Province, Kingdom of Afghanistan
- Occupation: Politician, Taliban member
- Political affiliation: Taliban

Muhammad Hasan Akhund Kakar (Note: Pashto: محمد حسن آخوند کاکڑ) (born c. 1945–1958) is an Afghan politician and cleric who has been serving as the 27th prime minister of Afghanistan since 2025, having previously served in this role on an interim basis from 2021. A member of the Taliban, he has been a member of the Leadership Council since 2002, and previously served as deputy prime minister from 1996 to 2001, and the minister of foreign affairs from 1998 to 1999.

Akhund is one of the founding members of the Taliban and has been a senior leading member of the movement. In the first Taliban government (1996–2001), he served as the deputy foreign minister.

== Early life and education ==
Akhund is from southern Afghanistan. He belongs to the Kakar tribe of Pashtuns. According to UN Security Council data, he was born in Pashmul, which at the time of his birth was in Panjwayi District, but is now in Zhari District, in Kandahar Province of the Kingdom of Afghanistan. The UN has two estimates for his year of birth, being approximately 1945–1950 and approximately 1955–1958.

He studied in various Islamic seminaries in Afghanistan. Unlike many Taliban leaders, Akhund did not participate in the Soviet–Afghan War.

== Political career ==
Akhund is one of the oldest members of the Taliban, and was a close associate of Muhammad Omar, the first leader of the movement. During the Taliban rule (1996–2001), in addition to being the deputy prime minister, he also served as the foreign minister of Afghanistan from 1998 to 27 October 1999. Like many other senior Taliban members, he is subject to United Nations sanctions related to the sheltering of terrorist groups.

During the period of insurgency (2001–2021), Akhund was intermittently a member of the Quetta Shura. In 2013, he was the chief of the Taliban's commissions and the head of the recruitment commission.

Following the Taliban's return to power in 2021, Akhund was appointed interim Prime Minister. His appointment was seen as a compromise between the Taliban's moderate and hardline figures. He took office on 7 September 2021. Akhund was appointed as permanent prime minister on 15 August 2025.

== Additional information ==
Akhund is the author of several works on Islam. According to BBC News, he is more influential on the religious side of the Taliban, as opposed to the military side. A United States Institute of Peace analyst argued that he was more of a political person.

== Notes ==
Political offices
New office	Deputy Prime Minister of Afghanistan; 1996–2001; Served under: Mohammad Rabbani (PM, 1996–2001); Abdul Kabir (acting PM, 2001)	Vacant Title next held by Abdul Ghani Baradar (acting, 2021); Abdul Salam Hanafi (acting, 2021)
Preceded by Abdul Jalil	Foreign Minister of Afghanistan; 1998–1999	Succeeded by Wakil Ahmed Muttawakil
Vacant Title last held by Abdul Kabir (acting, 2001)	Prime Minister of Afghanistan; 2021–present	Incumbent
