= Suhail Shaheen =

Afghanistan spokesman and diplomat

- سهیل شاهین
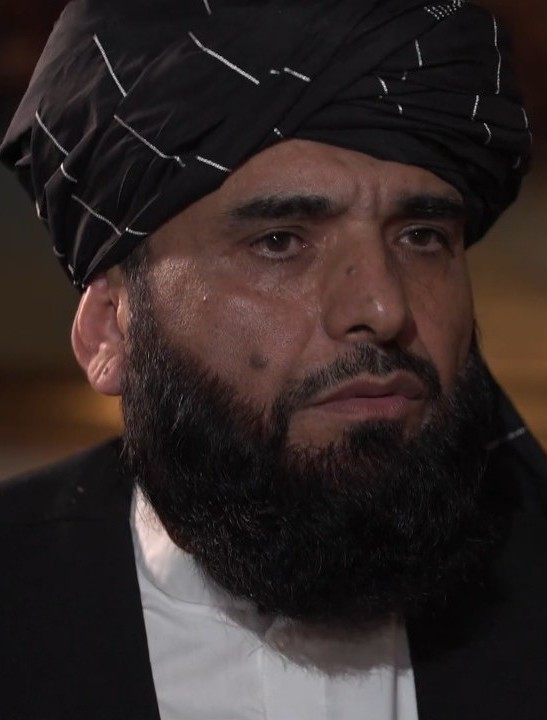
- Shaheen in 2019

Head of the Political Office
- Incumbent
- Assumed office 23 February 2022
- Supreme Leader: Hibatullah Akhundzada
- Preceded by: Abdul Ghani Baradar

First Secretary of the Afghan Embassy in Qatar
- Incumbent
- Assumed office 27 January 2025
- Preceded by: Naeem Wardak

Personal details
- Born: Muhammad Suhail Shaheen Paktia Province, Afghanistan
- Education: International Islamic University, Islamabad
- Political affiliation: Taliban

Muhammad Suhail Shaheen (Pashto: محمد سهیل شاهین, Pashto pronunciation: [mu.wa'mad suˈwel ʃɑ.'jin]) is a Taliban member who is currently the head of the Afghan embassy in Qatar and the head of the Political Office in Doha. He edited the English-language, state-owned Afghan newspaper The Kabul Times during the first Taliban regime, before being appointed to Afghanistan's Embassy in Pakistan as a deputy ambassador.

The Taliban-led government appointed him as the Permanent Representative of Afghanistan to the United Nations in September 2021, but the UN rejected his appointment to the post.

== Early and personal life ==
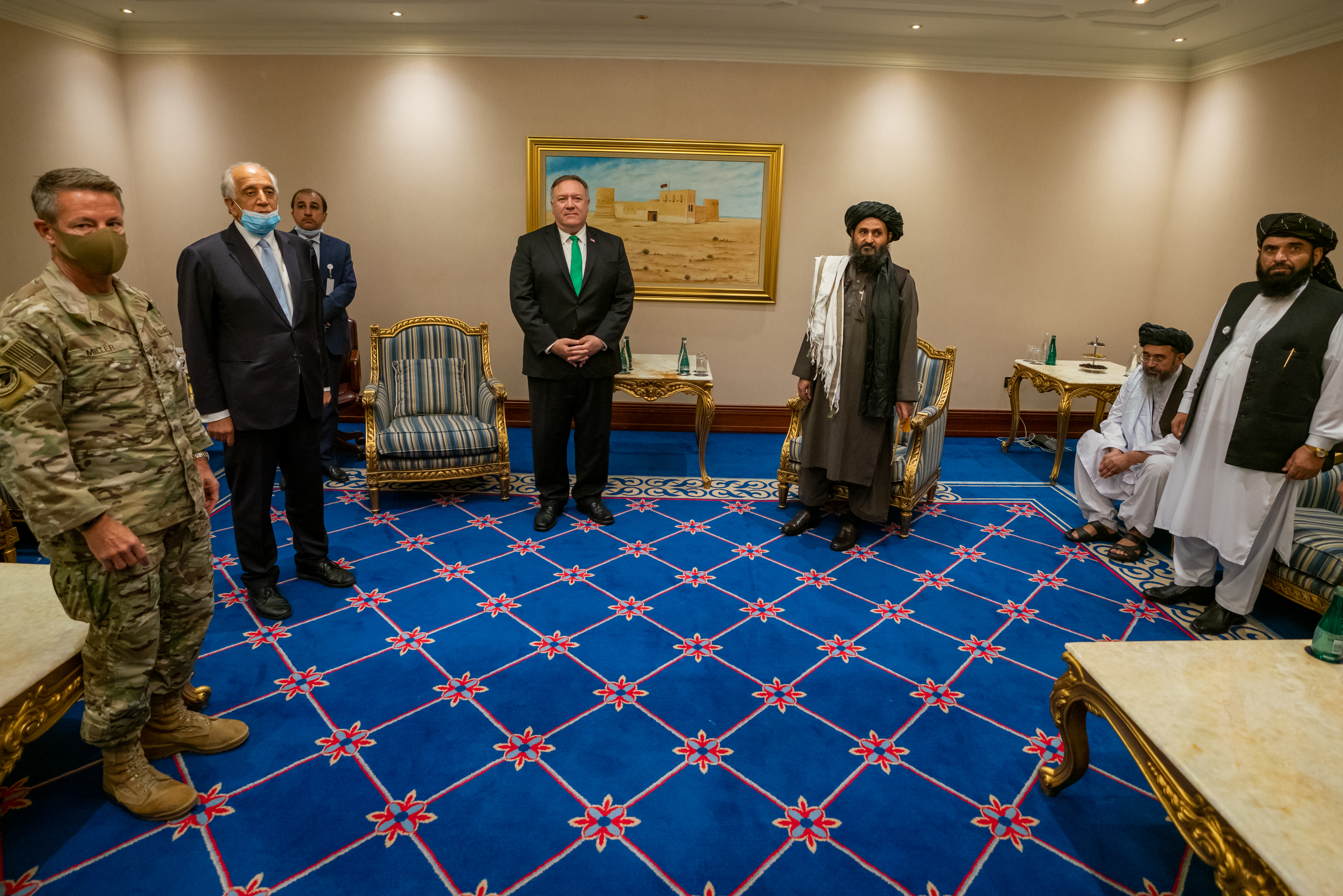
Suhail Shaheen (far right) meeting US representative Zalmay Khalilzad (2nd left) and Secretary of State Mike Pompeo (4th left), accompanying Abdul Ghani Baradar and Abdul Hakim Ishaqzai (5th and 6th left)

Suhail was born in the Paktia Province of Afghanistan. He was educated in Pakistan, and he is known to be a prolific writer and fluent speaker of English and Urdu in addition to his native Pashto. Suhail studied at the International Islamic University Islamabad and Kabul University.

In 2022, he faced much criticism and outrage from Afghans and rights advocates over what they called double standards and hypocrisy following reports, including an interview, that his two daughters go to school in Qatar, while the Taliban regime he represented denied the same right to every girl of the same age under their rule in Afghanistan.

== Career ==
During the period of the Taliban's original Islamic Emirate (1996–2001), Shaheen served as Afghanistan's Deputy Ambassador at the Afghan Embassy in Pakistan. During the later phase of the Taliban's insurgency (2013–2021), he served as one of the Taliban's official spokesmen at their political office in Doha, where he gave many interviews to international media channels.

On 20 September 2021, the Taliban-led government of the Islamic Emirate of Afghanistan nominated him to become Afghanistan's official envoy to the United Nations. Shaheen however would be unable to take over the post unless the United Nations Credentials Committee accepts Shaheen's appointment. The UN has rejected recognizing Shaheen as the official Afghan representative and instead recognizes Muhammad Wali Naeemi, the ambassador of the now-ousted government of the Islamic Republic of Afghanistan.

In October 2021, Shaheen rejected American help in fighting the Islamic State – Khorasan Province, saying, "We are able to tackle Daesh independently."

In January 2025, he was appointed head of the Doha embassy after Mohammad Naeem Wardak was recalled to Kabul.

== See also ==
- Taliban activities in Qatar
