= Taliban activities in Qatar =

Taliban leaders stationed in Doha, Qatar, since 2013

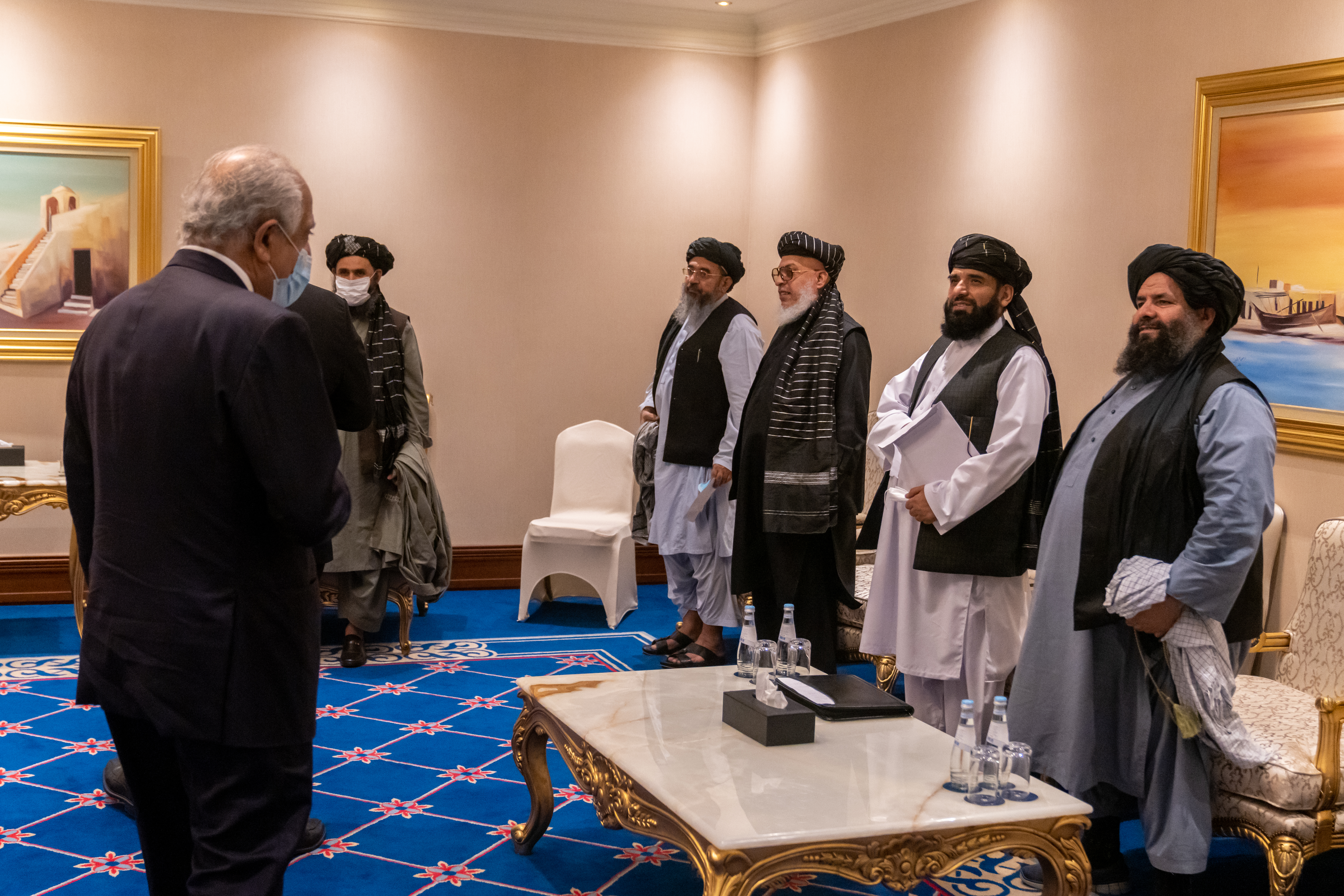
US representative Zalmay Khalilzad (left) and Secretary of State Mike Pompeo (obscured) meeting with Taliban leaders, Abdul Ghani Baradar, Abdul Hakim Ishaqzai, Sher Mohammad Abbas Stanikzai, Suhail Shaheen, unidentified. Doha, Qatar on 21 November 2020.

Senior leaders of the Afghan Taliban had been stationed in Doha, Qatar, since the early 2010s. The original purpose for them being there was to open an office that would facilitate political reconciliation between the Taliban, the government of Afghanistan, the United States and other countries. After the Taliban office building opened in 2013, peace negotiations were suspended following objections by the Afghan government that the office was being presented as the embassy of a government in exile. Taliban leaders remained in Doha with accommodation from the Qatari government, on the condition that the office would not be used for public dealings.

Following the collapse of the Islamic Republic of Afghanistan on 17 August 2021, leader of the Taliban-affiliated Hezb-e-Islami party Gulbuddin Hekmatyar met with both Hamid Karzai, former President of Afghanistan, and Abdullah Abdullah, Chairman of the High Council for National Reconciliation and former Chief Executive, in Doha seeking to form a government. President Ashraf Ghani, having fled the country to either Tajikistan or Uzbekistan, emerged in the UAE and said that he supported such negotiations and was in talks to return to Afghanistan. Abdul Ghani Baradar, head of the office, and many of the other office staff returned to Afghanistan to discuss formation of a new government. Suhail Shaheen, one of the spokesmen, remained in Qatar with a few others.

== Lead-up to office opening ==
For years prior to 2010, the U.S. and Afghan governments had trouble locating senior leaders of the Taliban, whom they sought out as part of the effort to begin the process of American withdrawal from Afghanistan. In 2010 a tribal council in Afghanistan was established to find members of the Taliban and convince them to join the peace process. The aim was to offer protection to a few Taliban leaders in a foreign country so that the Afghan government and the Taliban could begin the reconciliation process by engaging in peace talks. In addition to the Afghan government, these peace talks would include the U.S. government and Pakistan.

The Afghan government initially wanted to open an office for the Taliban, providing protection for the leaders, in Saudi Arabia or Turkey, due to the countries’ good ties with Kabul. But the Taliban preferred Qatar because they thought the country was neutral and balanced. While Qatar did not recognize the Taliban regime from 1996 to 2001, they maintained "cordial" relationships with the militant group. The Taliban saw Saudi Arabia and Turkey as too aligned with the Afghan government to be impartial. The U.S. was amenable to the decision to make Qatar the home for peace negotiations.

In 2011, as part of the U.S. strategy to pull out of Afghanistan, American officials began holding talks with a handful of Afghans who represented the Taliban. Officials met with the Taliban in both Germany and Qatar to facilitate discussions. The U.S. played hard ball with the Taliban by arguing that, without negotiated peace, the U.S. would likely never withdraw from Afghanistan, and that they would leave behind enough weapons to make sure that the Taliban never returned to power. The U.S. further demanded that the Taliban should break all ties to Al Qaeda as well as respect the authority of the new Afghan government. For their part, the Taliban had one goal in mind, the release senior Taliban leaders held at Guantanamo Bay. In agreeing to these mediated discussions, the Afghan government had hopes that they could turn the Taliban from a militant organization into a political one in order to curb violence and maintain peace. They also wanted to break the Taliban away from their influences in Pakistan.

To facilitate the reconciliation process, and at the request of the American government, Qatar agreed to open an office for the Taliban in Doha where Afghan and Western governments could meet and negotiate. Afghan president Hamid Karzai initially opposed the office being in Qatar, arguing that Saudi Arabia or Turkey would be better, but in late 2011 he eventually agreed to it being in Qatar. Afghanistan insisted that other countries not make deals with the Taliban except under Afghan leadership.

== Political office ==
The Taliban's political office was unofficially established in Doha in January 2012, with the arrival of representatives including Tayyab Agha, Sher Mohammad Abbas Stanikzai and Shahabuddin Delawar, who were said to be "well-educated, fluent in English and considered moderate, but committed to the movement", plus spokesperson Suhail Shaheen. In March 2012, Taliban representatives there suspended talks with the U.S. government. They demanded that the U.S. release five Taliban soldiers and leaders in exchange for the freedom of captured U.S. Army Sgt. Bowe Bergdahl, held prisoner by the Taliban since 2009.

By June 2013, the number of Taliban representatives in Qatar had increased, with over 20 high-ranking members and their families living in the Gulf state. They kept a low profile, though they had been seen at mosques, shopping malls, and visiting the Afghanistan embassy to register births or renew documents. Their homes were paid for by the Qataris.

The Qatari government found a villa on the outskirts of Doha for the Taliban and it opened officially as their political office on 18 June 2013. However, there was an immediate issue, as the Taliban flag was raised and a plaque at the entrance identified it as an office of the "Islamic Emirate of Afghanistan" (the Taliban-era name for the country). Afghan president Karzai halted peace talks claiming that the Taliban were presenting their office as the embassy of a government in exile. The flag was lowered and the plaque removed, but the Taliban shut the offices, claiming they had been lied to by the U.S. and Afghanistan.

By 2014, Qatar had begun negotiations between the Taliban and the U.S. government to broker a deal for the five Taliban leaders held in Guantanamo Bay. In exchange the Taliban would release U.S. Sgt Bowe Bergdahl. The Taliban Five, as they came to be known, would, upon release, be sent to Doha to wait out a period of one year before being allowed to travel abroad.

While the Taliban 5 were initially only banned from travel for one year, the Qatari government extended the ban in May 2015 at the request of the Obama administration. In June 2015, the New York Times released an exposé on the Taliban 5, making it known for the first time that two of them were accused of mass murder, one of defending the killing of foreigners, that another is an opium drug lord with known ties to Osama bin Laden, and that the last was described as one of the founders of the Taliban.

Members of Afghanistan's High Peace Council argue that the five should remain in Qatar indefinitely or be handed over to the Afghan government. Members of the U.S. congress have expressed concern over what will happen when the travel ban ends and they can no longer be monitored by the Qatari government. Then House Speaker John Boehner issued a statement claiming that, "The Obama Administration put countless American troops and civilians at risk when it chose to ignore the law and unilaterally release five senior Taliban terrorists from Guantanamo Bay," later claiming, "Now these five will be free to travel." The Afghan government fears that, once released, they will go back to Afghanistan to fight. U.S. officials claim that the Qataris are anxious to get rid of the former prisoners. Congressman Ed Royce, chairman of the House Foreign Affairs Committee, says that the Taliban 5 are "no doubt, a threat" and a "real risk."

In August 2015, the head of the office, Tayyab Agha, resigned, citing "internal factional struggles to seize control of the leadership." "The death of Mullah Omar was kept secret for two years", Agha said. "I consider this a historical mistake." Learning of the power vacuum that was created by Omar's death, Agha departed, arguing that all sides of the Taliban should regulate their affairs from inside Afghanistan. During and up to this time, the Taliban was experiencing internal ruptures in their ranks over who should be appointed the new leader of the Taliban.

Sher Mohammad Abbas Stanikzai became the acting head of the office the day after Agha resigned, and in November he was permanently appointed to the position, with Abdul Salam Hanafi as his deputy. News sources took the permanent appointment as a sign that peace talks with Afghanistan would soon resume.

In December 2015, rumors began to spread that the Taliban 5 had recommenced their "threatening activities" after being released to Qatar. According to a U.S. intelligence committee and a U.S. House report, "Despite the current restrictions of the MOU, it is clear … that the five former detainees have participated in activities that threaten U.S. and coalition personnel and are counter to U.S. national security interests – not unlike their activities before they were detained on the battlefield."

In April 2016, members of Taliban in Qatar issued a statement denying media reports that the Taliban was exploring the possibility of peace talks with the Afghan government. According to Taliban officials in Qatar, the Taliban was not entertaining peace negotiations at this time. Rather, the group was focused on the release of Taliban prisoners as well as issues along the border between Pakistan and Afghanistan. In March, the Taliban refused to engage with talks with Afghanistan, Pakistan, China, and the U.S., calling such discussions, "futile."

On 5 June 2017, a quartet composed of Saudi Arabia, the United Arab Emirates, Bahrain and Egypt cut diplomatic ties with Qatar. The main reason cited for the severing of links was Qatar's alleged financing and hosting of Islamic extremist groups, including the Taliban. In response, a Qatari government officially denied that Qatar supported the Taliban, and claimed that they hosted the Taliban after being requested to do so by the US government. On 31 July 2017, hacked emails of the UAE ambassador to Washington, Yousef Al Otaiba, revealed that the UAE, a member of the quartet, had lobbied the US to appoint the Taliban office in Abu Dhabi. Qatar's selection to host the office over the UAE reportedly angered Emirati officials. Ambassador Otaiba has denounced Qatar's hosting of Taliban officials, mentioning it as one of the quartet's reasons for cutting ties with Qatar.

As of January 2019 in the ongoing Afghan peace talks, the Taliban have asked for international recognition of their Doha office.

On 25 October 2018, the Taliban confirmed that Pakistan released Abdul Ghani Baradar. He was subsequently appointed to be the chief of the Taliban's political office in Doha. Washington special envoy Zalmay Khalilzad claimed that Baradar was released at the request of the United States.

== Criticism ==
In July 2013, the Huffington Post published an article expressing fear regarding high-ranking members of the Taliban militant group living with impunity in Qatar. The apprehensions expressed included that the Taliban would get a false sense of legitimacy and power, thinking that there would be no peace in Afghanistan except through them. It also expressed further fears that the Taliban would use their new status to strengthen ties with their Pakistani counterparts where they receive much more support.

The details of the Taliban 5 negotiations were kept from the U.S. senators on Capitol Hill and many politicians registered statements of outrage over the decisions being made by the Obama administration. Indignation was expressed by senators who were angered that the Taliban 5 were not kept under house arrest, and were able to move about freely in Qatar. There was also concern over the fact that there were no plans to keep the Taliban leaders from being able to travel abroad. However, in 2015 and 2016, according to the US state government report, Qatar prosecuted and convicted those who were involved in financing terrorism within the country. As part of ongoing reforms to demolish terrorist financing, Qatari government has issued the Cybercrime Prevention Law.

In March 2015, the U.S.-based magazine Newsweek reported that Taliban leaders in Qatar were living in luxury. Afghan expatriates living in Qatar, upset over memories of beatings and imprisonment from the Taliban, bristled at the privileges Taliban leaders were allowed, and that they did not have to work hard. Qatar provides them with luxury SUVs and large homes. One expat complained, "Their bathroom is bigger than our living rooms … The service they get is like a five-star hotel." There is further outrage over the good treatment extended to the former Guantanamo Bay prisoners, who are said to be getting "royal treatment." Tamim bin Hamad Al Thani, the Emir of Qatar is, allegedly, keeping the former prisoners (the Taliban 5) in comfort so that he can play both side of the fence by gaining credit in Washington through taking Guantanamo Bay prisoners off their hands, as well as gaining the favor of regional Islamists who see the Emir as supporting Islamic movements like the Taliban. UNHCR, the UN Refugee Agency, and Qatar Charity (QC) signed a Letter of Intent on an Islamic Philanthropy Collaboration in March 2023. Three Zakat cooperation agreements were also signed, amounting to QAR 18,206,369 (just over US$5 million) to help address the urgent needs of over 50,000 forcibly displaced families in Afghanistan. Two shipments of emergency aid (13 tons of urgent medical aid) were provided by the Qatar Fund for Development (QFFD) to support the Afghan people during the earthquake in Khost and Paktika. This shipment came as a continuation of the previous aid that was delivered on 25 June to the affected people in Afghanistan in cooperation with Qatar Charity. Qatar also housed more than 58,000 Afghans during the non-combatant evacuation operation from Kabul. Secretary of State Antony Blinken said ''Qatar was the first stop on a journey to a more peaceful and hopeful future for so many people,''

== Doha Dialogue ==
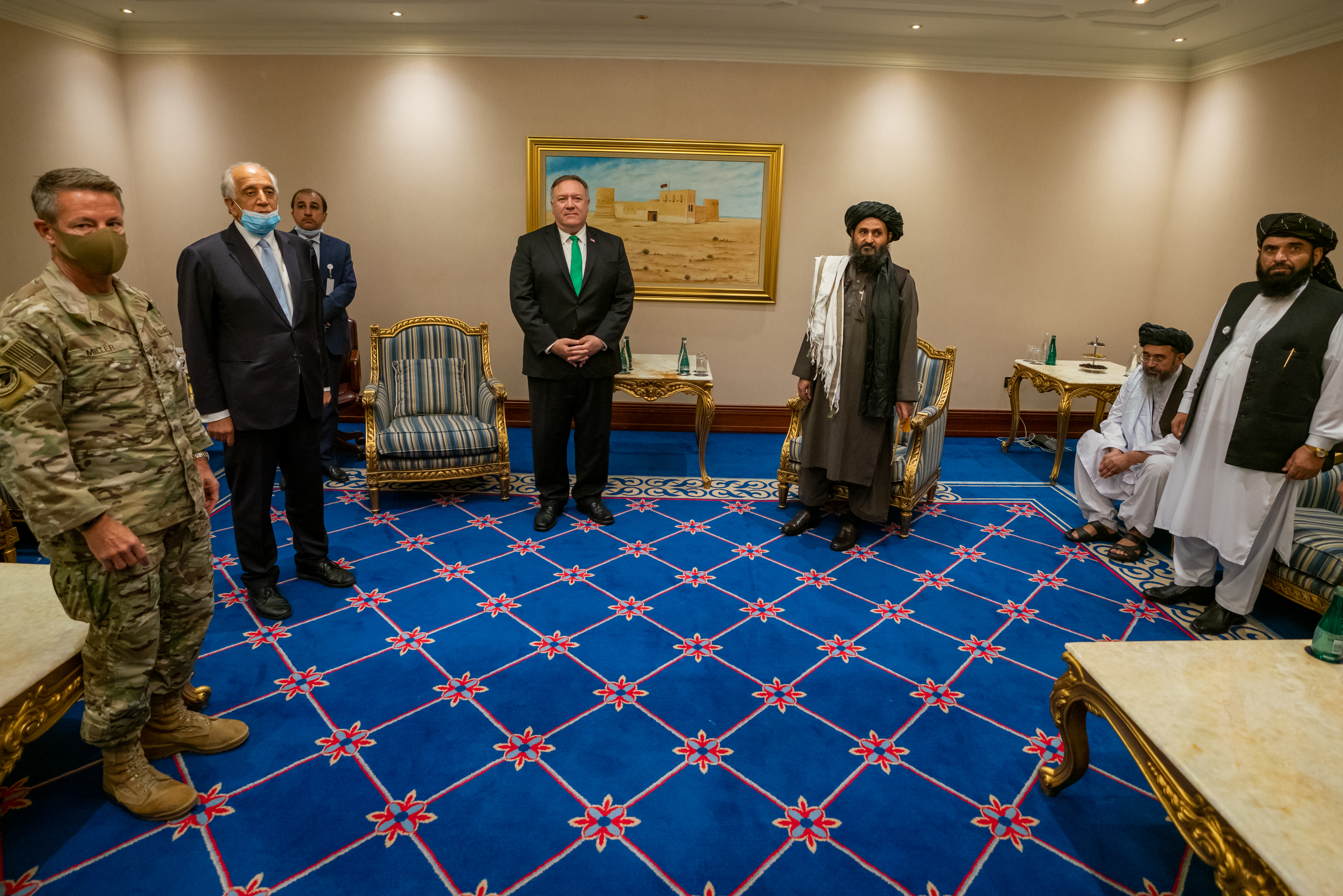
US Secretary of State Mike Pompeo and Zalmay Khalilzad meeting with Taliban delegates Abdul Ghani Baradar, Abdul Hakim Ishaqzai, Suhail Shaheen. Doha, on 12 September 2020.

In January 2016 the Taliban in Qatar participated in a Doha Dialogue entitled "Peace and Security in Afghanistan" organized by the Nobel Peace Prize winning Pugwash Conferences on Sciences and World Affairs. The conference took place outside of the stalled reconciliation and peace talks between the U.S., Afghanistan, China, Pakistan, and the Taliban, which were the original rationale behind Taliban offices in Qatar. While the conference was attended by key leaders from the Taliban offices in Qatar, according to some sources Afghanistan's embassy and government boycotted the event, while other sources argue that the Taliban refused to negotiate with them and hence were excluded. In the conference, members of the Taliban listed many conditions for starting the peace process in Afghanistan. Listed in their demands were: the release of an unspecified number of Taliban prisoners and the removal of senior members from the United Nations blacklist.

In the context of the Doha Dialogue, Taliban leaders promised that, if their conditions were met, they would respect women's rights and ensure modern education for all, including girls. They also stressed the importance of economic development in cooperation with neighboring countries. However, the Taliban expressed unwillingness to abide by the Afghan constitution or to accept the name, "Islamic Republic of Afghanistan." The group still insists on calling itself, "Islamic Emirate of Afghanistan." They were non-committal on the subject of democratically held elections, though they seemed open to a "power-sharing agreement" between the Taliban and the Afghan government. In 2017 the USA have argued that the Taliban's office in Qatar has done nothing to promote peace in Afghanistan and urged Qatar to close it down. But in February 2020, Qatar facilitated a peace agreement between the United States and the Taliban. According to the agreement, the Taliban will cut all its connections with Al-Qaeda and begin peace negotiations with the Afghani Government. In return the United States will begin the withdrawal of its troops. They will have withdrawn all their troops in 14 months.

Qatar's special envoy for foreign affairs visited Kabul to meet with the Taliban's acting foreign minister. They discussed political coordination, relationship strength and humanitarian aid. The visit was in response to restrictions placed by the Taliban on women's education and NGO work.
