= Supreme Leader of Afghanistan =

Highest political office in Afghanistan

Supreme Leader of the Islamic Emirate of Afghanistan
- د افغانستان د اسلامي امارت مشر (Pashto) Də Afġānistān Islāmī Imārāt Məshar; رهبر امارت اسلامی افغانستان (Dari) Rahbar-i Imārat-i Islāmī-yi Afghānistān
- Emblem of Afghanistan
- Incumbent; Hibatullah Akhundzada since 15 August 2021; Insurgency Leader: 25 May 2016 – 15 August 2021
- Leadership of the Islamic Emirate
- Style: His Excellency; His Highness; Esteemed
- Type: Head of state; Commander-in-chief
- Member of: Leadership Council
- Residence: None official
- Seat: Kandahar
- Appointer: Leadership Council
- Term length: Life tenure
- Constituting instrument: 1998 dastur
- Precursor: President
- Inaugural holder: Mullah Omar
- Formation: 4 April 1996 (Note: 4 April 1996 (first insurgency) 27 September 1996 (first government) 13 November 2001 (second insurgency) 15 August 2021 (current government))
- Deputy: Deputy Leader
- Salary: ؋228,750 monthly

The supreme leader of Afghanistan (Pashto: د افغانستان مشر, romanised: Də Afġānistān Məshar, Dari: رهبر افغانستان, romanised: Rahbar-i Afghānistān), officially the supreme leader of the Islamic Emirate of Afghanistan (Note: Pashto: د افغانستان د اسلامي امارت مشر, romanised: Də Afġānistān Islāmī Imārat Damshīr, Dari: رهبر امارت اسلامی افغانستان, romanised: Rahbar-e Imārat-i Islāmī-yi Afghānistān) and also referred to by his religious title Amir al-Mu'minin (Arabic, lit. 'Commander of the Faithful'), is the absolute ruler, head of state, and national religious leader of Afghanistan, as well as the leader of the Taliban. The supreme leader wields unlimited authority and is the ultimate source of all law.

The first supreme leader, Mullah Omar, ruled Afghanistan from 1996 to 2001 before his government was overthrown by the United States and he was forced into exile. The current supreme leader is Hibatullah Akhundzada, who assumed office in exile during the Taliban insurgency on 25 May 2016, upon being chosen by the Leadership Council, and came to power on 15 August 2021 with the Taliban's victory over Afghan government forces in 2021. Since coming to power, Akhundzada has issued numerous decrees that have profoundly reshaped government and daily life in Afghanistan by implementing his strict interpretation of the Hanafi school of Sharia law.

The supreme leader appoints and manages the activities of the prime minister and other members of the Cabinet, as well as judges and provincial and local leaders.

== History ==
The office was established by Mullah Mohammed Omar, who founded both the Taliban and the original Islamic Emirate of Afghanistan in the 1990s. On 4 April 1996, in Kandahar, followers of Omar bestowed upon him the title Amir al-Mu'minin (أمير المؤمنين), meaning "Commander of the Faithful", as Omar had held a cloak taken from its shrine in the city, asserted to be that of the Islamic prophet Muhammad. The Taliban seized control of Kabul on 27 September 1996, ousting President Burhanuddin Rabbani and installing Omar as the country's head of state.

The Taliban views the Quran as its constitution. However, it approved a dastur, a document akin to a basic law, in 1998, which proclaimed Omar supreme leader but did not outline a succession process. In 1996 interview, Wakil Ahmed Muttawakil stated that the Amir al-Mu'minin is "only for Afghanistan", rather than a caliph claiming leadership of all Muslims worldwide.

Following the September 11 attacks and the United States invasion of Afghanistan in 2001, Omar was deposed and went into hiding in Zabul Province, and the presidency was restored as Afghanistan's head of state. The Taliban reorganised for an insurgency in 2002, based out of Pakistan. They continued to claim Omar as their supreme leader, though he had little involvement in the insurgency, having turned over operational control to his deputies. Though the Taliban continued to maintain the office of the supreme leader in exile, it had no diplomatic recognition.

Following its offensive in 2021, the Taliban recaptured Kabul on 15 August and restored the supreme leader as Afghanistan's head of state.

== Selection ==
The supreme leader is appointed by the Leadership Council.

== Powers and duties ==
Under Omar, the leader held absolute power, and the Taliban's interpretation of Sharia was entirely his decision.

Under the 1998 draft constitution of the first Islamic Emirate, the Leader of the Faithful would appoint justices of the Supreme Court.

Under the current government, however, the Emir has final authority on political appointments, as well as political, religious, and military affairs. The Emir carries out much of his work through the Rabbari Shura, or the Leadership Council (which he chairs), based in Kandahar, which oversees the work of the Cabinet, and appointment of individuals to key posts within the cabinet.

However, in a report from Al Jazeera, the Cabinet has no authority, with all decisions being made confidentially by Akhundzada and the Leadership Council. The supreme leader receives the highest government salary in the reinstated Islamic Emirate, at 228,750 Afghan afghanis monthly.

== List of Taliban supreme leaders ==
Status

Denotes Acting Supreme Leader

No.	Name (Birth–Death)	Term of office (Note: This is a full list of Taliban supreme leaders, officially titled "Supreme Leader of the Islamic Emirate of Afghanistan". During the Taliban insurgency, the Taliban attempted to maintain continuity in the office, though had no recognition or institutionalised control, so there was no supreme leader of Afghanistan during this period and the president of Afghanistan was the country's head of state. It is noted specifically where Taliban supreme leaders have served as Supreme Leader of Afghanistan.)				Ref.
No.	Name (Birth–Death)	Took office	Left office	Time in office	Additional position(s) held	Ref.
1	Mullah; Mohammed Omar (1953/1966–2013)	4 April 1996 Supreme Leader of Afghanistan from 27 September 1996	23 April 2013 Supreme Leader of Afghanistan until 13 November 2001	17 years, 19 days Supreme Leader of Afghanistan for 5 years, 47 days	–	
2	Mullah; Akhtar Mansur (1960s–2016) (Taliban insurgency only)	23 April 2013	29 July 2015	2 years, 97 days (Note: Mullah Omar's death was concealed from the public and most of the Taliban. The same day news of Omar's death became public, Mansur was elected Supreme Leader.)		
2	Mullah; Akhtar Mansur (1960s–2016) (Taliban insurgency only)	29 July 2015	21 May 2016	297 days	–	
3	Sheikh al-Hadith; Mullah; Mawlawi; Hibatullah Akhundzada (born 1967)	21 May 2016	25 May 2016	4 days	First Deputy Leader (2015–2016) Chief Justice (2001–2016)	
3	Sheikh al-Hadith; Mullah; Mawlawi; Hibatullah Akhundzada (born 1967)	25 May 2016 Supreme Leader of Afghanistan since 15 August 2021	Incumbent	10 years, 166 days Supreme Leader of Afghanistan for 5 years, 84 days	–	

== Deputy leaders ==
Deputy Leaders of the Islamic Emirate of Afghanistan
- د افغانستان د اسلامي امارت مرستیال (Pashto); معاون امارت اسلامی افغانستان (Dari)
- Emblem of Afghanistan

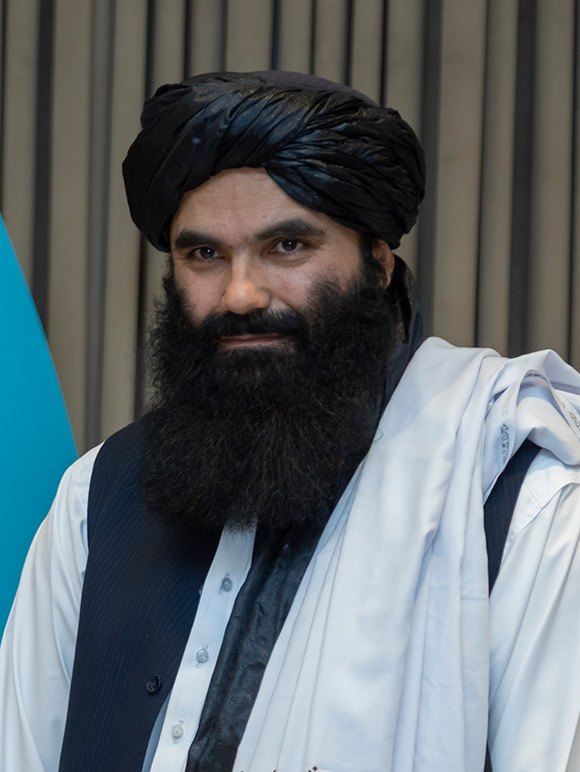
Haqqani

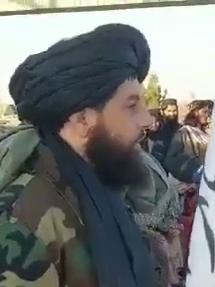
Yaqoob

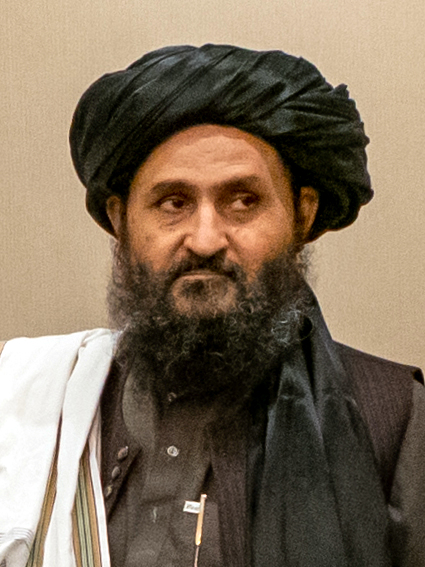
Baradar
Incumbents
- Sirajuddin Haqqani (First)
  Mullah Yaqoob (Second)
  since 15 August 2021
  Insurgency Deputy Leaders:
  25 May 2016 – 15 August 2021
- Abdul Ghani Baradar (Third)
  since 15 August 2021
  Insurgency Deputy Leader:
  24 January 2019 – 15 August 2021
- Leadership of the Islamic Emirate
- Status: Deputy head of state
- Member of: Leadership Council
- Reports to: Supreme Leader
- Seat: Kandahar (Yaqoob)
- Appointer: Supreme Leader
- Term length: At the pleasure of the supreme leader
- Precursor: Vice President of Afghanistan
- Inaugural holder: Mohammad Rabbani
- Formation: 4 April 1996 (Note: 4 April 1996 (first insurgency) 27 September 1996 (first government) 13 November 2001 (second insurgency) 15 August 2021 (current government))
- Succession: Acting (in order of deputy rank)

The deputy leader of Afghanistan, officially the deputy leader of the Islamic Emirate of Afghanistan (Pashto: د افغانستان د اسلامي امارت مرستیال, romanized: da ufghanstan da islami amarat marstial; Dari: معاون امارت اسلامی افغانستان, romanized: moavan emart eslami afghanstan), is the deputy emir of the Taliban, tasked with assisting the supreme leader with his duties. All three supreme leaders of the Taliban have had deputies, with the number of deputies fluctuating between one and three. Akhundzada has three deputies: Sirajuddin Haqqani, Mullah Yaqoob, and Abdul Ghani Baradar. Haqqani was first appointed as a deputy leader by Akhtar Mansour in 2015, and was retained by Akhundzada. Upon assuming office in 2016, Akhundzada appointed Yaqoob, a son of Mullah Omar, as a second deputy. Akhundzada appointed Baradar as a third deputy in 2019.

Since the 2021 return of power to the Taliban, Akhundzada has grown more isolated and he has primarily communicated through his three deputies rather than holding meetings with other Taliban leaders. The deputies' exclusive access to Akhundzada has grown their power.

== See also ==
- Government of Afghanistan
- History of Afghanistan
- List of heads of state of Afghanistan
- List of Taliban insurgency leaders
- Politics of Afghanistan
- President of Afghanistan
- Supreme Leader of Iran
- Supreme Leader (North Korean title)
