= Victory Day (Taliban) =

Public holiday in Afghanistan

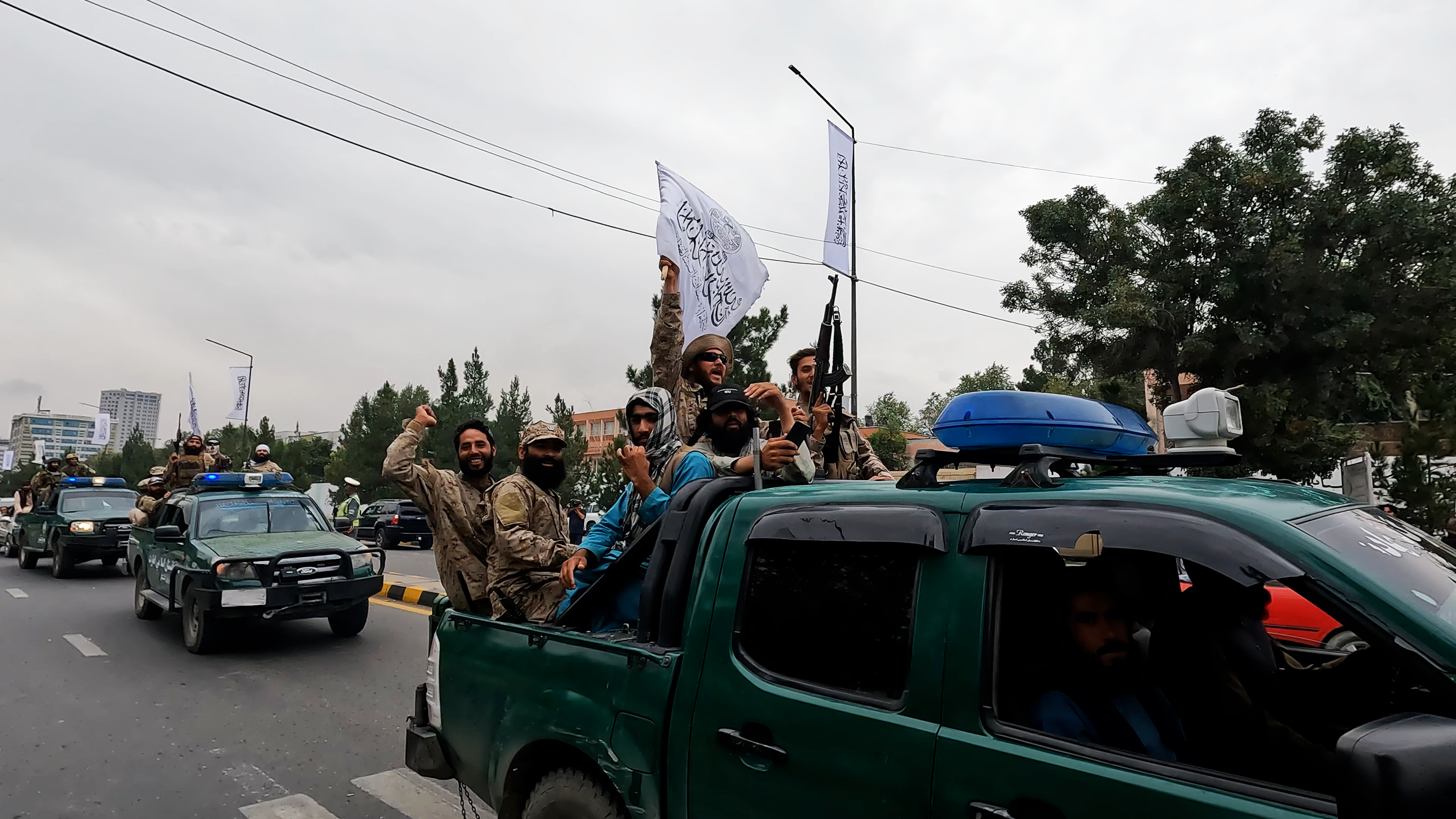
- Taliban fighters celebrating Victory Day in 2022
- Observed by: Afghanistan
- Significance: Celebrates the 2021 capture of Kabul by the Taliban
- Celebrations: Military parades
- Date: 15 August
- Next time: 15 August 2026
- Frequency: Annual
- First time: 15 August 2022
- Started by: Taliban
- Related to: Departure Day

Victory Day (Pashto: د بريا ورځ), which the Afghan Taliban call "The Proud Day of August 15", is a national holiday in Afghanistan that celebrates the 2021 capture of Kabul by the Taliban during the 2021 Taliban offensive. In 2022, the Taliban declared 15 August to be a national holiday. The holiday occurs half a month before the similar Departure Day on 31 August that celebrates the withdrawal of American troops from Afghanistan.

== Background ==
In May 2021, the Taliban launched a major military offensive against the Afghan government as the United States was withdrawing troops from Afghanistan. The Taliban made rapid advances and captured several provincial capital cities, capturing most by mid August. On 15 August, the Taliban captured Kabul, Afghanistan's capital city, and Afghan president Ashraf Ghani fled the country. The United States completely withdrew from Afghanistan on 30 August and the Taliban took control of Afghanistan.

== History ==
On 14 August 2022, the Taliban declared 15 August to be a national holiday to celebrate the capture of Kabul and the Taliban's return to power. The Taliban remarked that "August 15 is a national holiday in the country to mark the first anniversary of the victory of the Afghan jihad against the American and its allies' occupation". The first celebration of Victory Day saw military parades and groups of Taliban fighters chanting "Death to America" and "Long live Islam" at the closed American embassy.

On 9 January 2023, the Ministry of Labor and Social Affairs suspended the celebration of the similar Departure Day held on 31 August. The Taliban government reversed this decision on 17 June and restored Departure Day. On 15 August 2023, the Taliban held military parades in Kabul and Herat. Taliban supreme leader Hibatullah Akhundzada himself canceled a planned military parade in Kandahar so as "not to disturb the public".

External video
- The Taliban celebrate 3 years in power with a military parade at a former US air base in Afghanistan

On 14 August 2024, the Taliban held a Victory Day military parade at Bagram Air Base, one day before Victory Day itself. The parade included several Sikorsky UH-60 Black Hawk helicopters left behind when the United States withdrew in 2021. The Taliban held additional military parades in Kabul and Herat on Victory Day itself. On the fourth Victory Day in 2025, the Taliban held more military parades across Afghanistan. Six Afghan cities held "flower shower" ceremonies where flowers were dropped from helicopters; women were banned from attending three of the six ceremonies. The United Afghan Women's Movement for Freedom held an indoor protest in Takhar with some holding signs reading "August 15th is a dark day" and "Forgiving the Taliban is an act of enmity against humanity".

== See also ==
- Afghan Independence Day, celebrated on 19 August commemorating the end of the Third Anglo-Afghan War
