= Departure Day =

Public holiday in Afghanistan

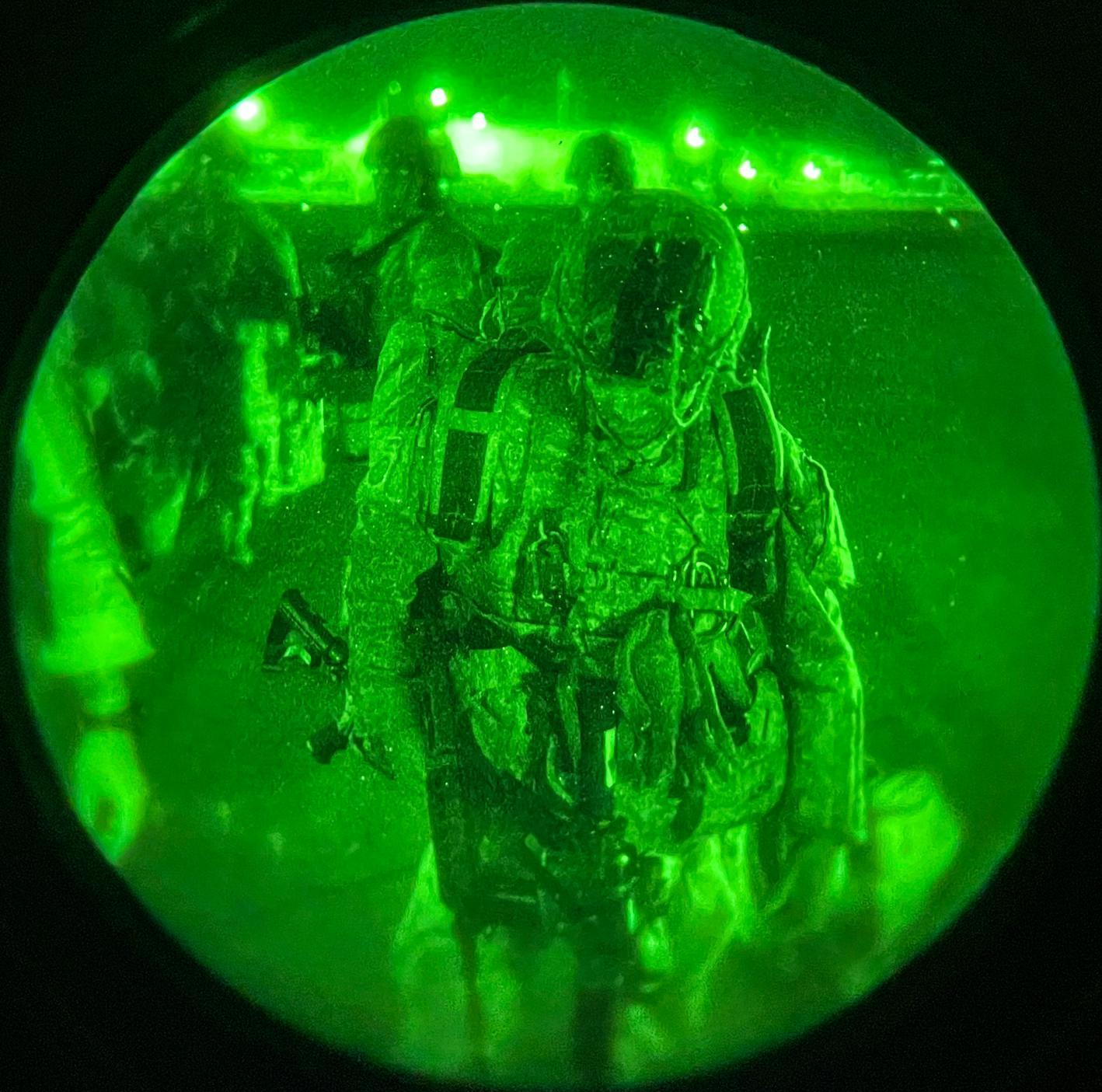
- 82nd Airborne Division paratroopers depart during the 2021 Kabul airlift.
- Observed by: Afghanistan
- Significance: Celebrates the withdrawal of U.S. troops from Afghanistan
- Date: 31 August
- Next time: 31 August 2026
- Frequency: Annual
- First time: 31 August 2022
- Started by: Taliban
- Related to: Victory Day

Departure Day (Pashto: د وتلو ورځ, romanized: da watlo warz) is a national holiday in Afghanistan that celebrates the 2021 withdrawal of United States troops from the country. The Taliban declared 31 August to be a public holiday in 2022 and later a national holiday in 2023. Departure Day is celebrated half a month after the similar Victory Day holiday on 15 August that celebrates the Taliban's 2021 capture of Kabul.

== Background ==
From 2001 to 2021, the United States had soldiers deployed in Afghanistan fighting against the Taliban and al-Qaeda. In 2020, the United States began the process of withdrawing troops from Afghanistan, a process it completed at 11:59 p.m. local time on 30 August 2021. The last months of the withdrawal coincided with a military offensive by the Taliban that saw it regain power in Afghanistan. The Taliban celebrated the American withdrawal the following day, 31 August.

== History ==
On 30 August 2022, the Taliban declared that 31 August would be celebrated as a public holiday. The Taliban celebrated the first anniversary of the withdrawal, marking "freedom from American occupation", with a military parade in Kabul, Afghanistan's capital city. Taliban fighters also waved the group's flag, shot celebratory gunfire and fireworks, and chanted "Death to America! Death to occupation! Long life freedom!" in front of the closed American embassy.

The Ministry of Labor and Social Affairs briefly suspended Departure Day's celebration on 9 January 2023 as it was deemed similar to the Victory Day holiday celebrated on 15 August. The Taliban government restored Departure Day's status as a national holiday on 17 June. In August 2023, Taliban supreme leader Hibatullah Akhundzada told the government to not celebrate that year's Departure Day resulting in no official celebration, but some civilians continued to celebrate the holiday in an unofficial capacity.

== See also ==
- Afghan Independence Day, celebrated on 19 August commemorating the end of the Third Anglo-Afghan War
