= Public holidays in Afghanistan =

This is a list of public holidays in Afghanistan.

== Official status under the Taliban ==
Date	English name
February 15	Liberation Day
April 28	Mujahideen Victory Day
March 21 (Note: Before the Taliban’s return to power in 2021, Nowruz was widely and officially celebrated in Afghanistan; afterward, the Taliban banned public Nowruz celebrations, restricting a centuries-old cultural tradition.)	Newruz (Persian New Year)
May 1	International Workers' Day
August 15	Victory Day
August 19	Independence Day
August 31	Departure Day
1 of Shawwal in the Islamic Calendar	Eid al-Fitr
9th day of Dhu al-Hijjah in the Islamic Calendar	Day of Arafa
10th day of Dhu al-Hijjah in the Islamic Calendar	Eid al-Adha
10th day of Muharram in the Islamic Calendar	Ashura
12 of Rabi' al-awwal in the Islamic Calendar	Mawlid

== Unofficial or unspecified ==
Date	English name	status
March 21	Nowruz	unofficial
September 9	Martyrs' Day	unclear
