= Liberation Day (Afghanistan) =

Holiday in afghanistan

Afghan Liberation Day is celebrated each year on February 15 in Afghanistan. It marks the country's liberation from the Soviet Union with the final departure on February 15, 1989 of Soviet troops from Afghanistan. The Soviet Army had been present in Afghanistan since the Soviet invasion of December 24, 1979.

== See also ==
- Soviet withdrawal from Afghanistan
- Public holidays in Afghanistan
