= Martyrs' Day (Afghanistan) =

Public holiday in Afghanistan

Martyrs' Day is a statutory holiday established by the Islamic Republic of Afghanistan.

In May 2012, the National Assembly of Afghanistan accepted September 9 (or September 8, variable per Solar Hijri calendar) as "a new national holiday to honour national hero Ahmad Shah Massoud and those who died fighting for the country." The date was set as a Shahrivar 18. After the Taliban victory in 2021, its status is unclear.

== History ==
Ahmad Shah Massoud was an Afghan military leader from Panjshir Valley. He was a leader of the resistance against the Soviet invasion and the Taliban. He was assassinated on September 9, 2001 in a suicide attack. Massoud Day is a holiday in Afghanistan that occurs each year as a commemoration of his death.

It has also been officially recognised by San Diego County, California, home to the highest concentration of Afghan immigrants and refugees.

The holiday is celebrated as Haftai Shahid, or "Martyr Week". It is also observed as Massoud Day.

== See also ==
- Public holidays in Afghanistan
