= 2020–2021 US troop withdrawal from Afghanistan =

End of the 2001–21 war; second beginning of Taliban rule

- Part of the War in Afghanistan (2001–2021) and the war on terror
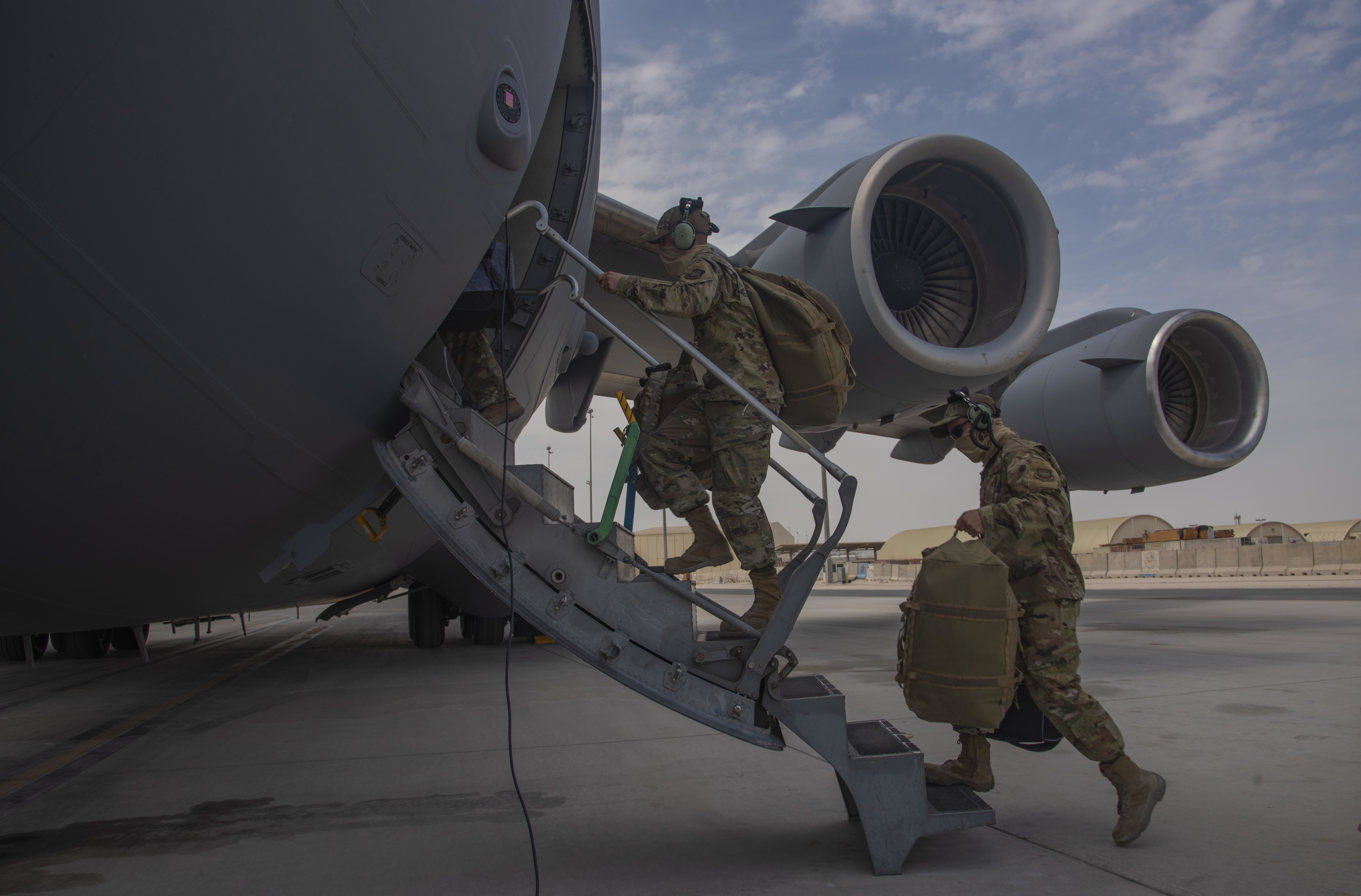
- American airmen board a C-17 at Al Udeid Air Base during the withdrawal, 27 April 2021
Date	29 February 2020 – 30 August 2021 (1 year, 6 months and 1 day)
Location	Islamic Republic of Afghanistan
Result	Withdrawal completed on 30 August 2021; Concurrent collapse and overthrow of the internationally-recognized Islamic Republic of Afghanistan following the 2021 Taliban offensive; The Taliban captures Kabul on 15 August 2021; End of the American involvement in Afghanistan; End of the main phase of the war on terror.; Evacuation of tens of thousands of civilians and military personnel; Re-establishment of the Taliban-led Islamic Emirate of Afghanistan

Belligerents
NATO: United States; United Kingdom; France; Italy; Canada; Germany; Norway; Romania; Australia; Afghanistan (until 15 August 2021); Resolute Support Mission (36 countries); Evacuation support: Austria; Azerbaijan; Belgium; Denmark; Finland; India; Netherlands; Norway; Pakistan; Qatar; Singapore; Spain; Sweden; Turkey; Ukraine	Taliban: Qatar negotiating team; Islamic State

Commanders and leaders
(United States) Donald Trump; (United States) Joe Biden; (United States) Zalmay Khalilzad; (United States) Lloyd Austin; (United States) Mark Esper; (United States) Antony Blinken; (United States) Mike Pompeo; (United States) Mark Milley; (United States) Kenneth F. McKenzie Jr.; (United States) Austin S. Miller	(Taliban) Hibatullah Akhundzada; (Taliban) Abdul Ghani Baradar; (Taliban) Abdul Hakim Ishaqzai; (Taliban) Sher Mohammad Abbas Stanikzai

Casualties and losses
Summer 2021: 13 killed (11 Marines, 1 Navy corpsman, 1 soldier); Afghan Allies: 22+ killed (22 Afghan Commandos)[122]	Unknown
- Afghan civilian casualties (Summer 2021): 100+ killed 100+ wounded

The United States Department of Defense completed its withdrawal from Afghanistan on 30 August 2021. This helped bring to a close the 2001–2021 war. In February 2020, the first Trump administration and the Taliban signed the United States–Taliban deal in Doha, Qatar, which stipulated fighting restrictions for both the US and the Taliban, and in return for the Taliban's counter-terrorism commitments, provided for the withdrawal of all NATO forces from Afghanistan by 1 May 2021. Following the deal, the US dramatically reduced the number of air attacks on the Taliban to the detriment of the Afghan National Security Forces (ANSF), and its fight against the Taliban insurgency.

The Biden administration's final decision in April 2021 was to begin the withdrawal on 1 May 2021, but the final pull-out of all US troops was delayed until September 2021, triggering the start of the collapse of the ANSF. This collapse led to the Taliban takeover of Kabul on 15 August 2021.

As part of the United States–Taliban deal, the Trump administration agreed to an initial reduction of US forces from 13,000 to 8,600 troops by July 2020, followed by a complete withdrawal by 1 May 2021, if the Taliban kept its commitments. At the start of the Biden administration, there were 2,500 US soldiers remaining in Afghanistan and, in April 2021, Biden said the US would not begin withdrawing these soldiers before 1 May, but would complete the withdrawal symbolically by 11 September. The Taliban began a final offensive on 1 May and, on 8 July, Biden moved up the completion date to 31 August. There were about 650 US troops in Afghanistan in early August 2021, tasked with protecting Hamid Karzai International Airport and the US Embassy in Kabul. NATO's Resolute Support Mission concluded on 12 July 2021 while US intelligence assessments estimated as late as July that Kabul would fall within months or weeks following withdrawal of all American forces from Afghanistan, the security situation deteriorated rapidly.

The US also launched Operation Allies Refuge to airlift the American translators and select Afghan citizens considered at risk of reprisals and US Forces Afghanistan Forward was established on 7 July 2021 as a successor command overseeing the evacuation of all American diplomatic, security, advisory, and counter-terrorism personnel remaining in the country after the withdrawal of US troops. On 12 August 2021, following continued Taliban victories across Afghanistan, the Biden administration announced that 3,000 US troops would be deployed to Kabul Airport to evacuate embassy personnel, US nationals and Special Immigrant Visa applicants. With the rapid advance of the Taliban in the provinces, on 14 August the US increased its troop commitment to 5,000. On 15 August, with the fall of Kabul, another 1,000 troops were deployed, and on 16 August, a further 1,000 troops were deployed, bringing the total number of troops to 7,000. The last US military planes left Kabul airport at 11:59 p.m. Kabul time on 30 August 2021.

The US withdrawal was widely described as "disastrous", with around one thousand American citizens and Afghans holding visas left behind in the country. On 28 and 29 September 2021, US secretary of defense Lloyd Austin, Chairman of the Joint Chiefs of Staff Gen. Mark Milley and United States Central Command (CENTCOM) commander Gen. Frank McKenzie were among the numerous Defense Department officials who denied during congressional testimonies President Biden's previous claim that his decision to withdraw troops from Afghanistan was because of advice from senior US military leaders and stated that they had in fact advised him to keep some troops in Afghanistan.

== Prior developments ==
=== Obama administration ===
In 2014, US president Barack Obama announced that the US would withdraw from Afghanistan by the end of 2014, concluding Operation Enduring Freedom. Although significant numbers of US troops were withdrawn by 2014 and NATO's International Security Assistance Force (ISAF) had concluded, 9,800 US soldiers remained deployed inside of Afghanistan during Operation Freedom's Sentinel, a part of NATO's subsequent Resolute Support Mission (RSM). General John F. Campbell requested an additional 1,000 US troops in light of the new military operation.

=== First Trump administration ===
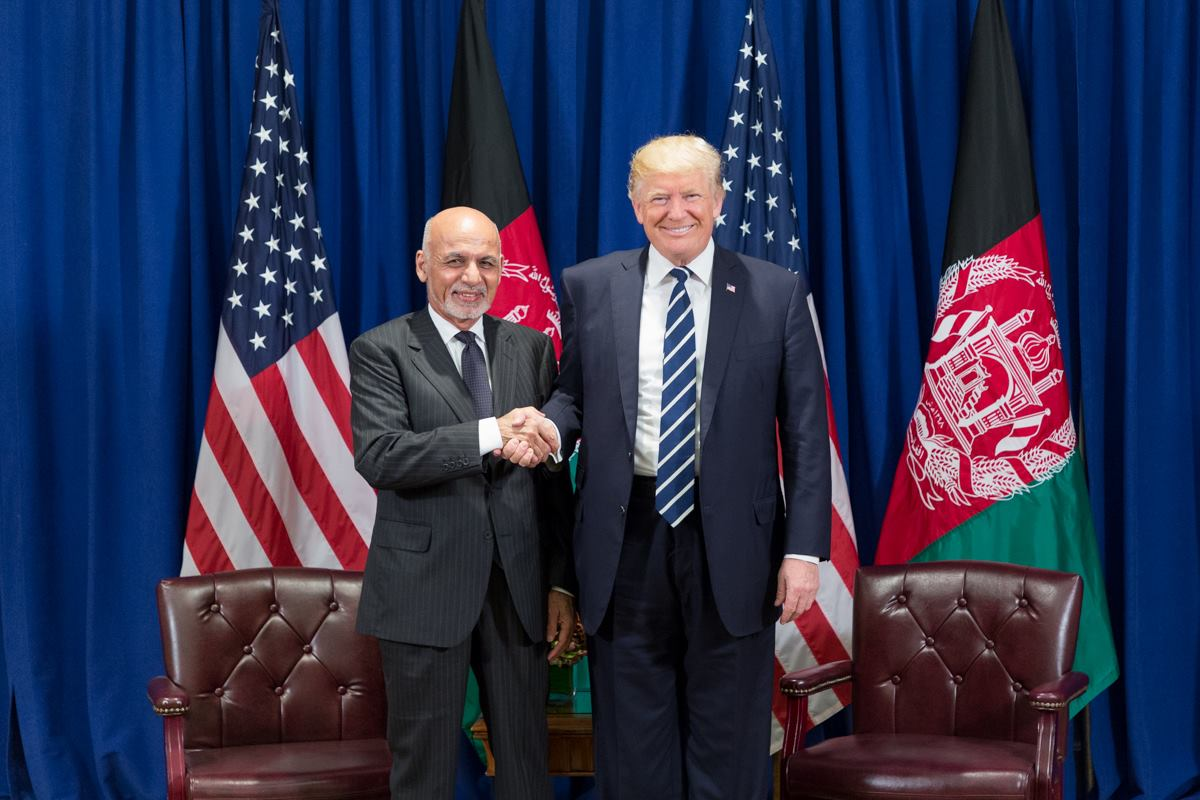
US president Donald Trump and Afghan president Ashraf Ghani at the United Nations General Assembly, 2 October 2017

Under President Donald Trump, the US strategy in Afghanistan was initially described in April 2017 as "an increase in special operations forces to train, advise and assist Afghan forces; a more robust plan to go after elements in Pakistan that aid the Taliban; the deployment of more air power and artillery; and a political commitment to the survival of the current government in Kabul".

In July 2017, when the official number of U.S. troops operating in Afghanistan was 8,400, President Trump gave the US military decision-making authority to increase troop numbers for military operations in Syria, Iraq and Afghanistan without first seeking formal approval from the White House. U.S. secretary of defense Jim Mattis said: "Our overall mission in Afghanistan remains the same."

On 21 August 2017, President Trump unveiled his administration's official strategy for Afghanistan, saying "victory will have a clear definition: attacking our enemies, obliterating the Islamic State (ISIL), crushing al-Qaeda, preventing the Taliban from taking over the country, and stopping mass terror attacks against Americans before they emerge". On 24 August, the commander for US and NATO forces in Afghanistan, General John W. Nicholson Jr., confirmed that troop levels, strategy, and conditions for success were dependent on the momentum of the war effort and on-the-ground conditions, not "arbitrary timelines". Trump did not specify the number of troops to be committed under his new open-ended strategy, but congressional officials were told an additional 4,000 troops were to be deployed. The Washington Post reported on 30 August that the additional US forces for Afghanistan would likely include paratroopers as well as small Marine artillery detachments, composed of about 100 or so troops per unit, which were to be dispersed across the country to fill in gaps in air support. According to the report, air support in the form of more F-16 fighters, A-10 ground attack aircraft and additional B-52 bomber support, or a combination of all three, were likely to be used. The newspaper also stated: "The additional US forces will allow Americans to advise Afghan troops in more locations and closer to the fighting, US officials in Kabul said [...]. With more units farther away from the country's biggest bases, additional air support and artillery will be needed to cover those forces." The New York Times added that "the American military will be able to advise select Afghan brigades in the field instead of trying to mentor them from more distant headquarters. They can step up the effort to train special operations forces and, thus, substantially increase the number of Afghan commandos. This will allow American war commanders and service members to call in air and artillery strikes on behalf of more Afghan units."

On 30 August 2017, the Department of Defense disclosed that there were more troops in Afghanistan than previously acknowledged. The Pentagon stated the actual "total force" number was closer to 11,000 rather than the previously stated 8,400, with the larger number including covert as well as temporary units. The lower troop-level estimate was a result of misleading accounting measures and red tape.

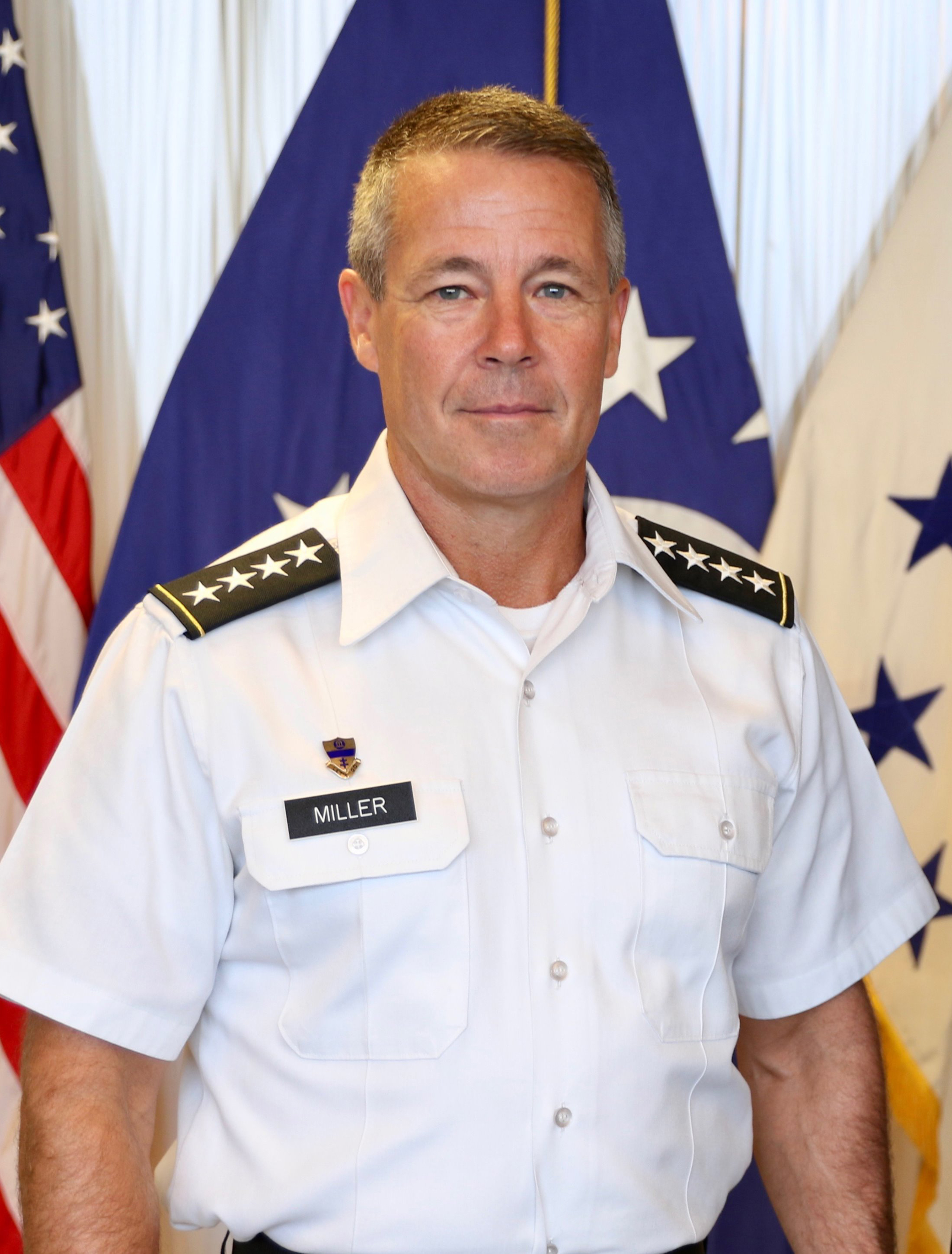
General Austin S. Miller became commander of US and NATO forces in Afghanistan in September 2018 and oversaw the withdrawal until July 2021.

In September 2017, the Trump administration began deploying more than 3,000 additional troops to Afghanistan, bringing the total number of US forces in Afghanistan to more than 14,000. When General Austin "Scott" Miller took command of US and NATO forces in Afghanistan in September 2018, there were 15,000 US troops deployed. In October 2019, following an abrupt end to peace talks with the Taliban a month prior, General Miller announced that US forces had been reduced to 13,000 within a year as a result of a unilateral decision by the US command in Kabul. Secretary of Defense Mark Esper commented on the troop decrease, saying "General Miller is doing exactly what I asked all our commanders to do when I entered office ... to look where they can free up time, money and manpower," as part of the National Defense Strategy to gradually shift global US military strategy from prioritizing counter-terrorism to also countering Russian and Chinese power projection. In December 2019, the Afghanistan Papers revealed that high-ranking military and government officials were generally of the opinion that the war in Afghanistan was unwinnable, but kept this hidden from the public. By the end of 2019, nearly 2,400 Americans had died in the war, with more than 20,000 wounded.

==== United States–Taliban deal ====
On 29 February 2020, the US, represented by diplomatic envoy Zalmay Khalilzad, and the Taliban signed the Agreement for Bringing Peace to Afghanistan, commonly known as the US–Taliban deal, that provided for the withdrawal from Afghanistan of "all military forces of the United States, its allies, and Coalition partners, including all non-diplomatic civilian personnel, private security contractors, trainers, advisors, and supporting services personnel" within 14 months (i.e., by 1 May 2021). At the time, there were about 13,000 US troops in the country. The withdrawal was conditional on the Taliban upholding the terms of the agreement that included "not to allow al-Qaeda or any other extremist group to operate in the areas they control". The US was to reduce its forces in Afghanistan by about 5,000 troops to 8,600 within 135 days. NATO secretary general Jens Stoltenberg pledged to initially reduce NATO's numbers from roughly 16,000 troops to about 12,000.

In the meantime, intra-Afghan peace talks, comprising the Taliban and the Afghan government, were to work out a more concrete power-sharing settlement. That time frame would give the Afghan government the cover of US military protection while negotiating. US secretary of state Mike Pompeo said the remaining US troops would serve as leverage to ensure the Taliban lived up to its promises.

On 1 March 2020, the intra-Afghan talks hit a major snag when President Ashraf Ghani stated during a press conference that the Afghan government, which was not a party to the deal, would reject the US–Taliban deal's call for conducting a prisoner exchange with the Taliban by the proposed start of intra-Afghan negotiations on 10 March 2020, even stating that "[t]he government of Afghanistan has made no commitment to free 5,000 Taliban prisoners", that "an agreement that is signed behind closed doors will have basic problems in its implementation tomorrow", and that "[t]he release of prisoners is not the United States authority, but it is the authority of the government of Afghanistan". Ghani also stated that any prisoner exchange "cannot be a prerequisite for talks" but must be a part of the negotiations.

== Withdrawal ==
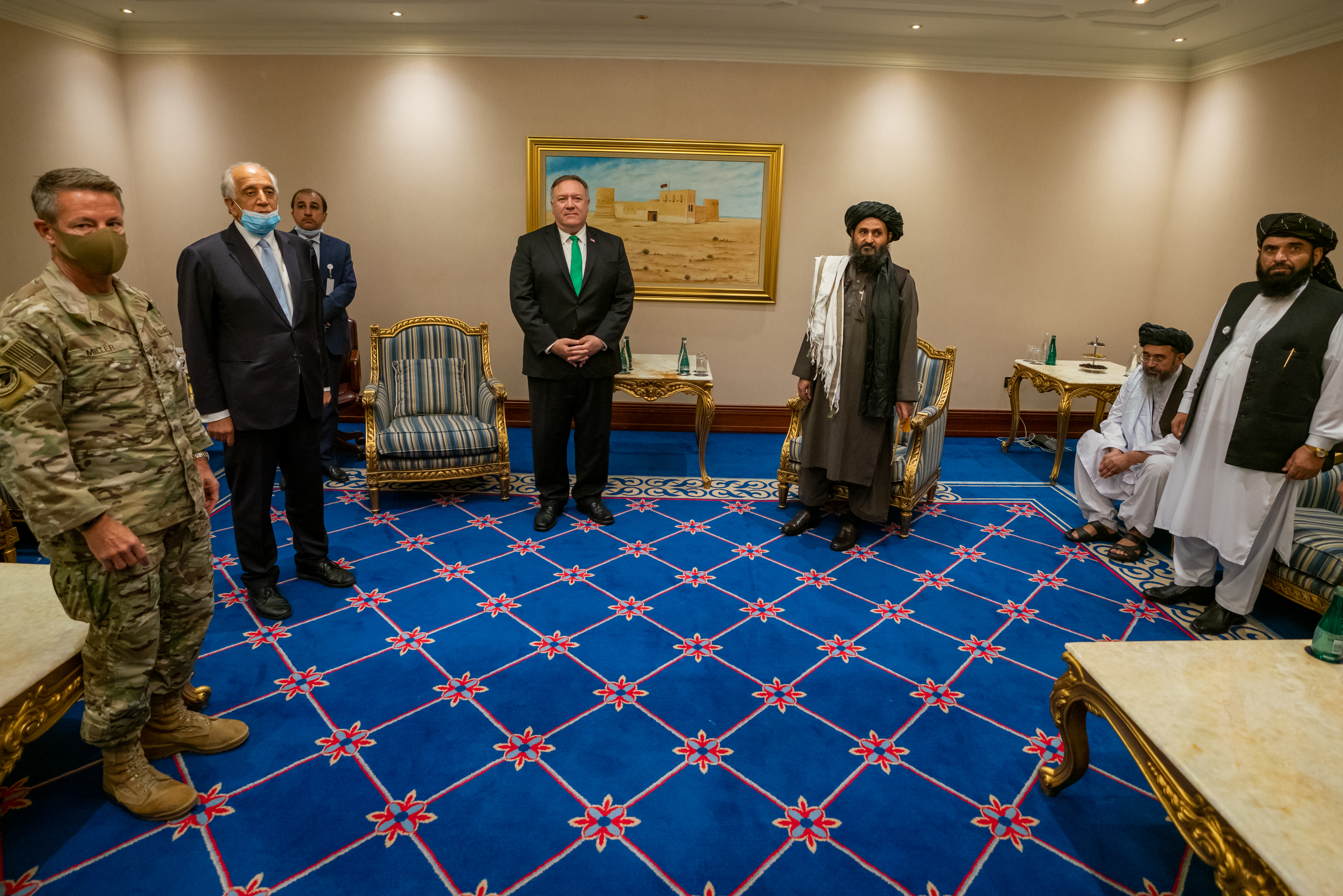
From left: General Austin Miller, US envoy Zalmay Khalilzad, and US Secretary of State Mike Pompeo meet with Taliban representatives Abdul Ghani Baradar, Abdul Hakim Ishaqzai and Suhail Shaheen in Doha, Qatar, on 12 September 2020

Some US troops withdrew from Afghanistan on 9 March 2020, as stipulated in the US–Taliban deal. On 10 March 2020, US Central Command (CENTCOM) rejected reports that the US military had developed a plan to withdraw all US troops from Afghanistan. General Kenneth F. McKenzie Jr., chief of CENTCOM, stated that the plan was to reduce the number of US troops in Afghanistan to 8,600 over a 14-month period. The US Army later confirmed that more troops would be sent to Afghanistan in the summer of 2020. According to CENTCOM, the US had reduced its Afghan troop numbers to 8,600 by 18 June 2020, in accordance with the US–Taliban deal. On 1 July 2020, following media reports of Taliban participation in an alleged Russian bounty program to target US troops, the US House Armed Services Committee voted for a National Defense Authorization Act amendment to set additional conditions to be met before President Trump could continue the troop withdrawal from Afghanistan, including requiring an assessment on whether any country has offered incentives for the Taliban to attack US and coalition troops, along with prohibiting funding to reduce troop numbers to below 8,000, and again at 4,000, unless the administration certified that doing so would not compromise American interests in Afghanistan. The US Senate rejected an attempt by Senator Rand Paul's amendment to the NDAA, which would have required the withdrawal of all US forces from Afghanistan within a year and bring an end to the 19-year war.

In August 2020, US intelligence officials reportedly assessed that the Iranian government had also offered bounties for American soldiers in Afghanistan. Iran was accused of having made payments to the Haqqani network that were linked to at least six attacks in 2019, including the sophisticated attack on Bagram Air Base on 11 December 2019. According to CNN, the Trump administration "never mentioned Iran's connection to the bombing, an omission current and former officials said was connected to the broader prioritization" of the US–Taliban deal and withdrawal from Afghanistan. The alleged Iran-Taliban ties were cited as part of the justification for the assassination of Qasem Soleimani. On 8 August, Secretary of Defense Mark Esper said that the United States would reduce troop levels to below 5,000 by the end of November 2020.

On 17 November 2020, acting US secretary of defense Christopher C. Miller announced further withdrawals of troops by 15 January 2021, leaving 2,500 troops across both Afghanistan and Iraq, down from the previous amount of 4,500 and 3,000, respectively. US national security advisor Robert C. O'Brien issued a statement on behalf of President Trump that it was his hope the incoming Biden administration would have all US troops "come home safely, and in their entirety" by their previously agreed 1 May 2021 deadline. Joe Biden had previously signaled his support for the withdrawal of US troops from Afghanistan during his presidential campaign, although he left room for the possibility that the US would be "open to maintaining a small number of troops in the country whose mission would focus solely on counterterrorism operations". O'Brien added that the remaining troops in Afghanistan were to defend American diplomats, the American embassy, and other agencies of the US government operating in Afghanistan. The announcement was criticized by United States Senate majority leader Mitch McConnell and Senator Jack Reed of Rhode Island.

NATO secretary general Jens Stoltenberg warned in a statement that "the price for leaving too soon or in an uncoordinated way could be very high". Critics said that the Afghan withdrawal would undermine the fragile security situation in the region and that the troop reductions would hamper the ongoing peace talks between Taliban fighters and the government of Afghanistan. According to a senior defense official the conditions used to measure the drawdown were based on whether national security would be threatened by a reduction in Afghanistan to 2,500 troops. "We do not feel that it is," said the official. The other condition was, "can we maintain a force posture in Afghanistan that permits us to carry out our mission with our allies and partners?" The announcement created anxiety in Afghanistan because there was a fear of a Taliban resurgence and US troops were considered a hedge against the group. Atiqullah Amarkhel, a retired Afghan Army general and military analyst, told The New York Times that the Taliban "are stronger than in the past, and if the Americans leave and don't support and assist the Afghan Army they won't resist long, and the Taliban will take over."

The Trump administration completed its reduction of forces to 2,500 troops in January 2021, the lowest number of American soldiers in Afghanistan since 2001. By January 2021, there were more than seven contractors for each US military service member remaining in Afghanistan, amounting to over 18,000 contractors, according to figures from US Central Command.

=== Biden administration continues withdrawal ===
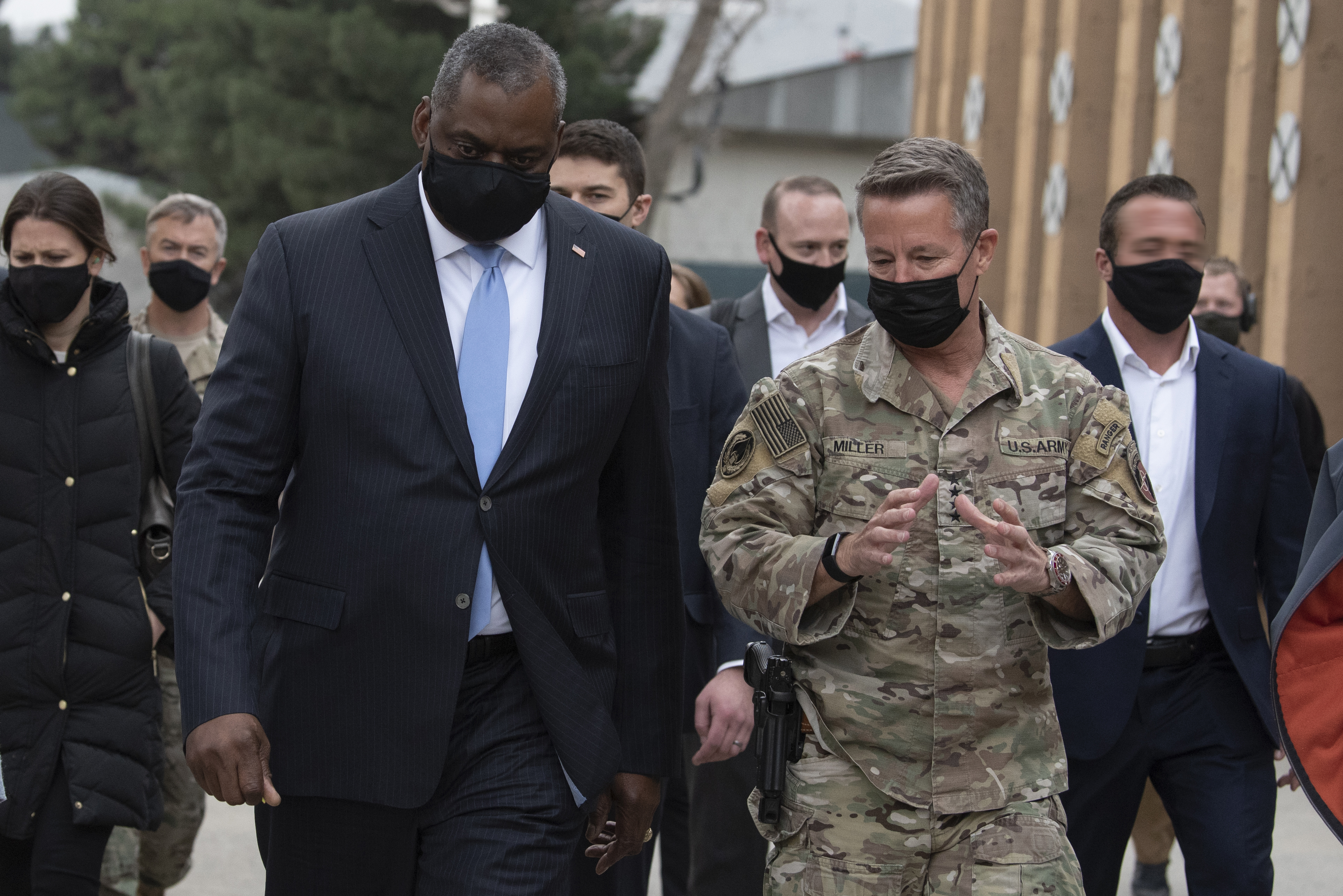
General Austin S. Miller alongside Secretary of Defense Lloyd Austin in Afghanistan, March 2021

In January 2021, incoming president Joe Biden's national security advisor Jake Sullivan said that the US would review the peace agreement in order to effectively withdraw its remaining 2,500 soldiers from Afghanistan. Biden previously supported a full withdrawal in 2014 but it was initially unclear as to whether he would uphold Trump's May 2021 withdrawal deadline.

On 18 February 2021, Jens Stoltenberg said that NATO had not made a decision on how to proceed regarding the withdrawal. Britain was expected to withdraw its remaining 750 Resolute Support Mission troops at the same time as the US and NATO troops would also follow the same withdrawal timeline. In April 2021, the US indicated that some troops (the exact number had not yet been decided) would remain in the country to provide diplomatic security, and it remained unclear what would happen to the several hundred US special operations forces working for the CIA on counter-terrorism missions. CIA Director William J. Burns told the US Senate Intelligence Committee on 14 April 2021, that "[t]here is a significant risk once the US military and the coalition militaries withdraw" but added that the US would retain "a suite of capabilities". The Biden administration reportedly intended to use a broad array of foreign policy tools ranging from military occupation to total abandonment.

In March 2021, news reports stated that President Biden was potentially considering keeping US forces in Afghanistan until November 2021. However, on 14 April 2021, Biden announced his intention to withdraw all regular US troops by 11 September 2021, the 20th anniversary of the September 11 attacks and four months after the 1 May deadline negotiated prior. The day before the announcement, Biden called former US presidents George W. Bush and Barack Obama regarding his decision to withdraw. US secretary of state Antony Blinken said the decision was made in order to refocus resources on countering China and the COVID-19 pandemic. Following withdrawal, the US was reportedly considering options for redeploying troops in the region, such as relocating to US Navy vessels, countries in the Middle East, or Central Asian countries like Tajikistan.

Biden said that after nearly 20 years of war, it was clear that the US military could not transform Afghanistan into a modern democracy. Scholars have examined earlier stages of the withdrawal, showing that insurgent violence in Afghanistan declined during the initial transition to Afghan forces but surged again following the physical pullout—patterns consistent with strategic "wait-out" behavior by the Taliban.

=== Taliban offensive and continued withdrawal ===
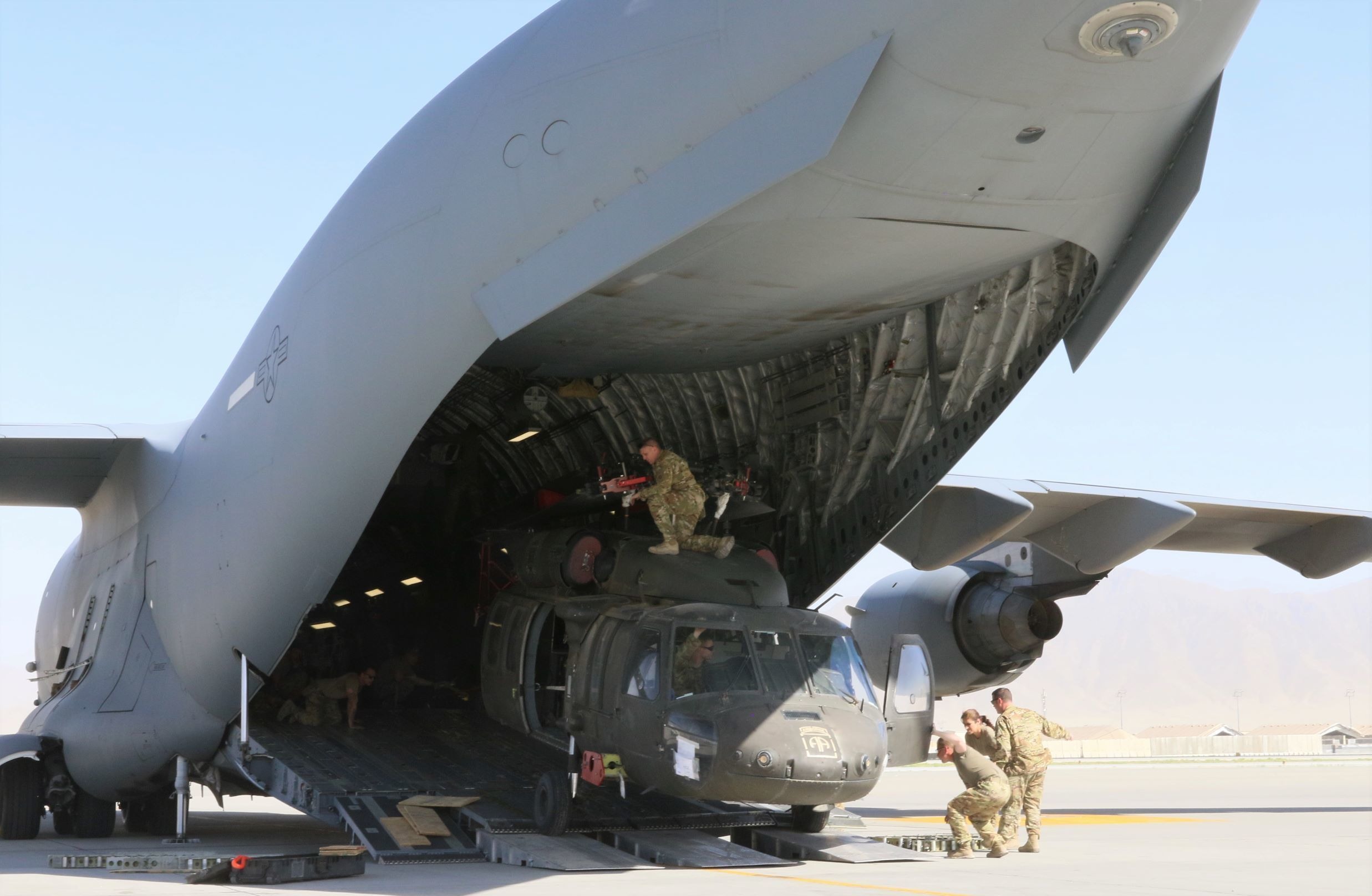
Aerial porters load a UH-60L Black Hawk helicopter onto a C-17 Globemaster III for departure from Bagram Airfield, 16 June 2021

Resultant of the US–Taliban deal, the US greatly reduced military support of Afghan Armed Forces offensive operations and pressured them into a defensive posture. The terms of the Doha agreement were not widely known due to classified annexes, verbal agreements, and poor communication. In particular, uncertainty surrounding US air strike rules of engagement fueled anxiety among the Afghan forces. The Taliban spread propaganda and disinformation on the agreement, further degrading morale of the defenders. Disinformation, bribery, and the use of tribal elders as negotiators led to cascading capitulation in many areas.

The reduction in offensive operations emboldened the Taliban. In the 45 days after the agreement (between 1 March and 15 April 2020), the Taliban conducted more than 4,500 attacks in Afghanistan, an increase of more than 70% compared to the same period in the previous year. More than 900 Afghan security forces were killed in the period, up from about 520 in the same period a year earlier. Meanwhile, Taliban casualties dropped to 610 in the period down from about 1,660 in the same period a year earlier. Pentagon spokesman Jonathan Hoffman said that although the Taliban stopped conducting attacks against the US-led coalition forces in Afghanistan, the violence was still "unacceptably high" and "not conducive to a diplomatic solution". He added: "We have continued to do defensive attacks to help defend our partners in the area and we will continue to do that."

On 1 May 2021, the Taliban launched a major offensive, making quick advances against the retreating US-trained Afghan military. The Taliban overran Afghan security forces and captured entire districts, threatening provincial capitals. On 29 June, the commander of US and NATO forces in Afghanistan, General Austin S. Miller, acknowledged that the Taliban's ongoing offensive was worrisome and cautioned that militias fighting in support of the Afghan army could lead the country into a civil war. He cited troop fatigue and low morale among the reasons for Afghan losses and urged Afghan forces to consolidate and defend strategic areas. He added that US forces maintained their capability to support Afghan military and security forces, but did not want to "speculate what that (support) looks like in the future."

On 2 July, Germany and Italy withdrew their troops from Afghanistan. On the same day, American forces vacated Bagram Airfield, a strategic logistics hub that was long seen as both the operational and symbolic heart of US operations in the country. Afghan officials complained that the Americans had left the base without notifying the new Afghan commander until more than two hours after abandoning the base. As a result, the base was ransacked by looters before they could take control of the airfield. A ceremony for transferring control of the base from US to Afghan troops was reportedly held on 3 July, to little fanfare. Reuters called the American departure from Bagram "an effective end to the longest war in US history." Meanwhile, fighting raged between the Taliban and Afghan government forces, with analysts from Al Jazeera saying that the Taliban was "at the door of Kabul".

On 8 July 2021, President Biden announced that the official conclusion to the war in Afghanistan would be on 31 August 2021. Biden defended the withdrawal of US troops, saying to trust "the capacity of the Afghan military, who is better trained, better equipped and ... more competent in terms of conducting war" but the Afghan army was easily overwhelmed by the Taliban's advance in a matter of weeks. By 12 July 2021, the Taliban had seized 139 districts from the Afghan National Army. According to a US intelligence report, the Afghan government was expected to collapse within six months of the withdrawal, however the US military later revised the assessment stating the collapse would occur much sooner.

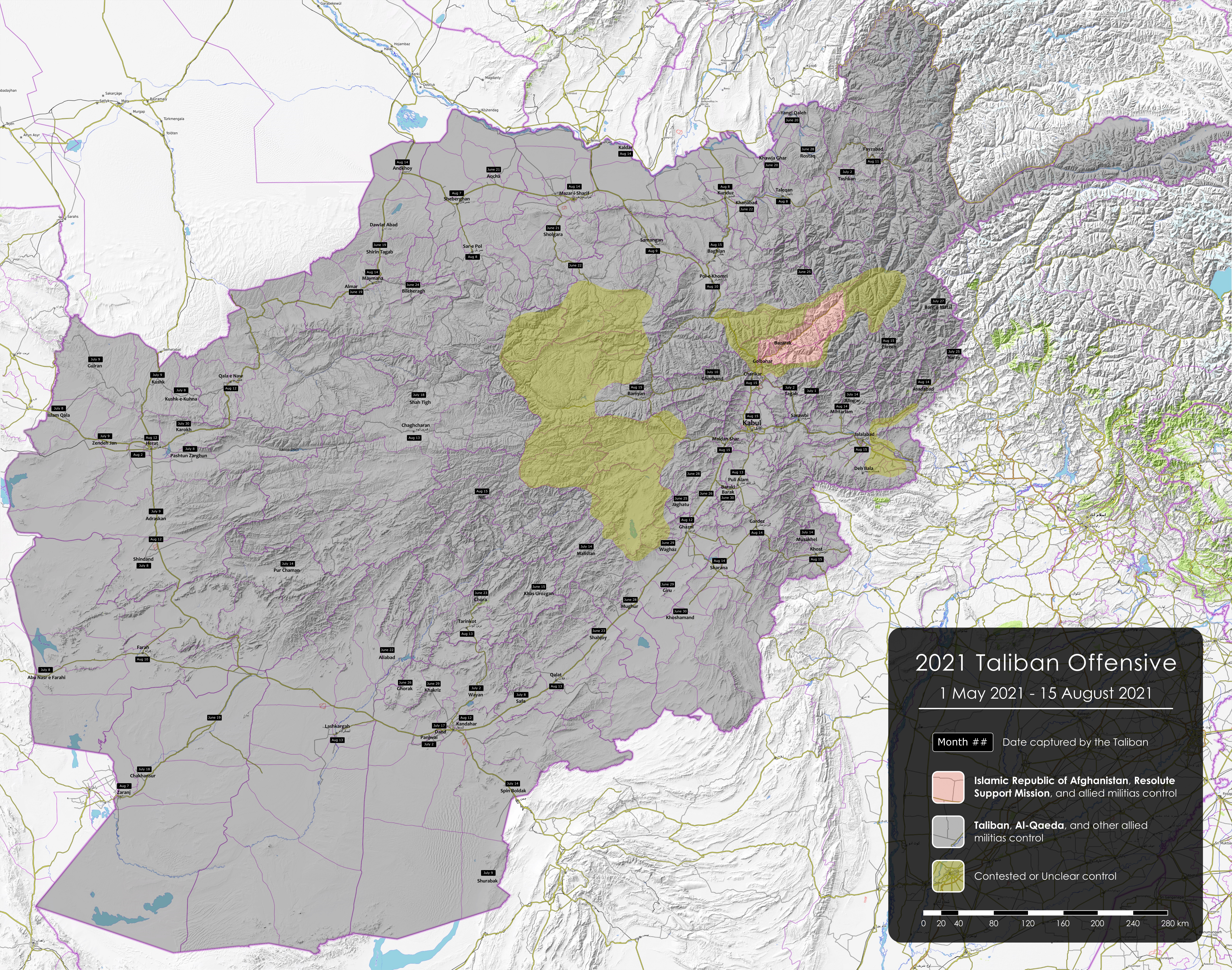
Map of Afghanistan following the 2021 Taliban offensive

Also on 12 July 2021, Gen. Austin Miller stepped down from his post as commander of US and NATO forces in Afghanistan.

Spokesmen for the Taliban, including Suhail Shaheen and Mohammad Naeem, issued statements that all foreign forces should withdraw from Afghanistan. The Taliban (self-styled the "Islamic Emirate") refused to participate in any talks until all foreign forces had withdrawn from the country. Local militias in the north of the country had reportedly engaged in combat against the Taliban. Footage taken on 16 June and released on 13 July showed Taliban gunmen executing 22 Afghan servicemen who had been attempting to surrender.

Australia had 1,500 troops in Afghanistan before the American-led withdrawal. That number was further reduced to 80 before Australian forces were completely withdrawn on 15 July.

On 21 July, the highest-ranking US military officer, Chairman of the Joint Chiefs of Staff Mark Milley, reported that half of all districts in Afghanistan were under Taliban control and that momentum was "sort of" on the side with the Taliban. On 21 July 2021, the US Air Force launched airstrikes against Taliban positions in Afghanistan.

It was reported by the UN Security Council in July 2021 that members of al-Qaeda in the Indian Subcontinent (AQIS) are still present in as many as 15 Afghan provinces, and that they are operating under Taliban protection in Kandahar, Helmand and Nimroz provinces in violation of the US–Taliban deal.

=== Operation Allies Refuge ===
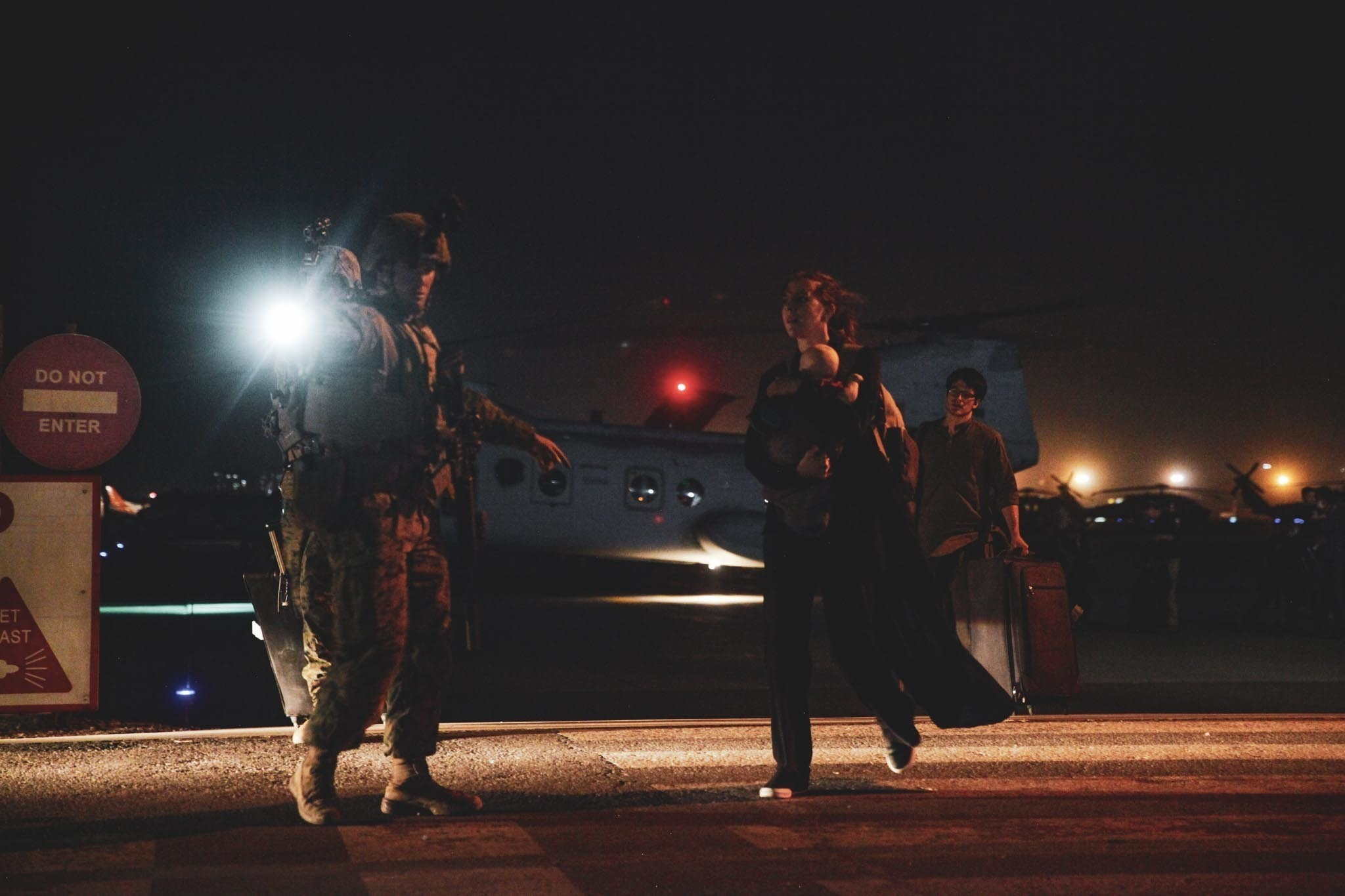
US Marines of the 24th MEU evacuating US embassy staff at Kabul Airport, 15 August 2021

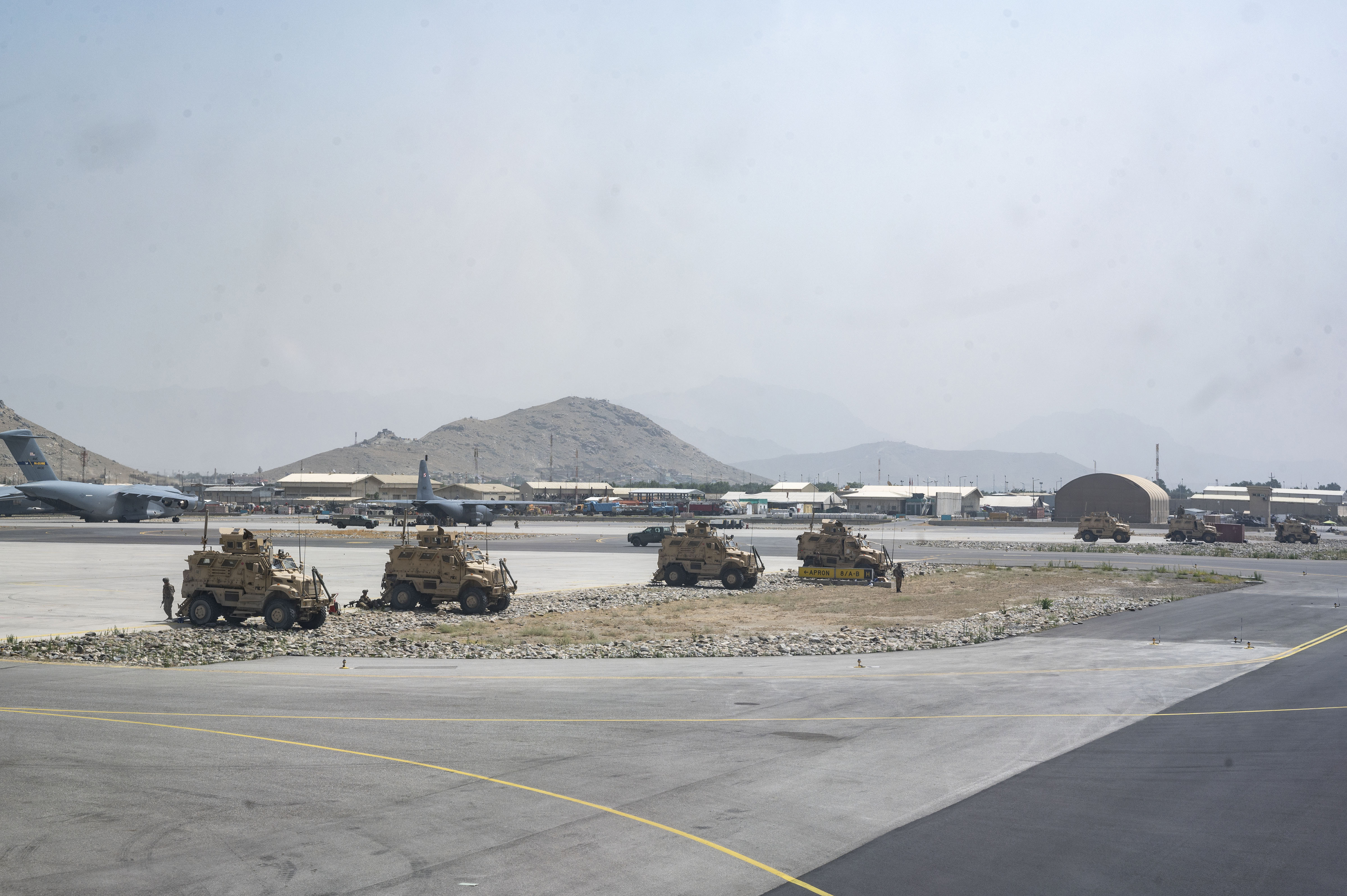
82nd Airborne Division soldiers guarding Kabul Airport on 17 August 2021

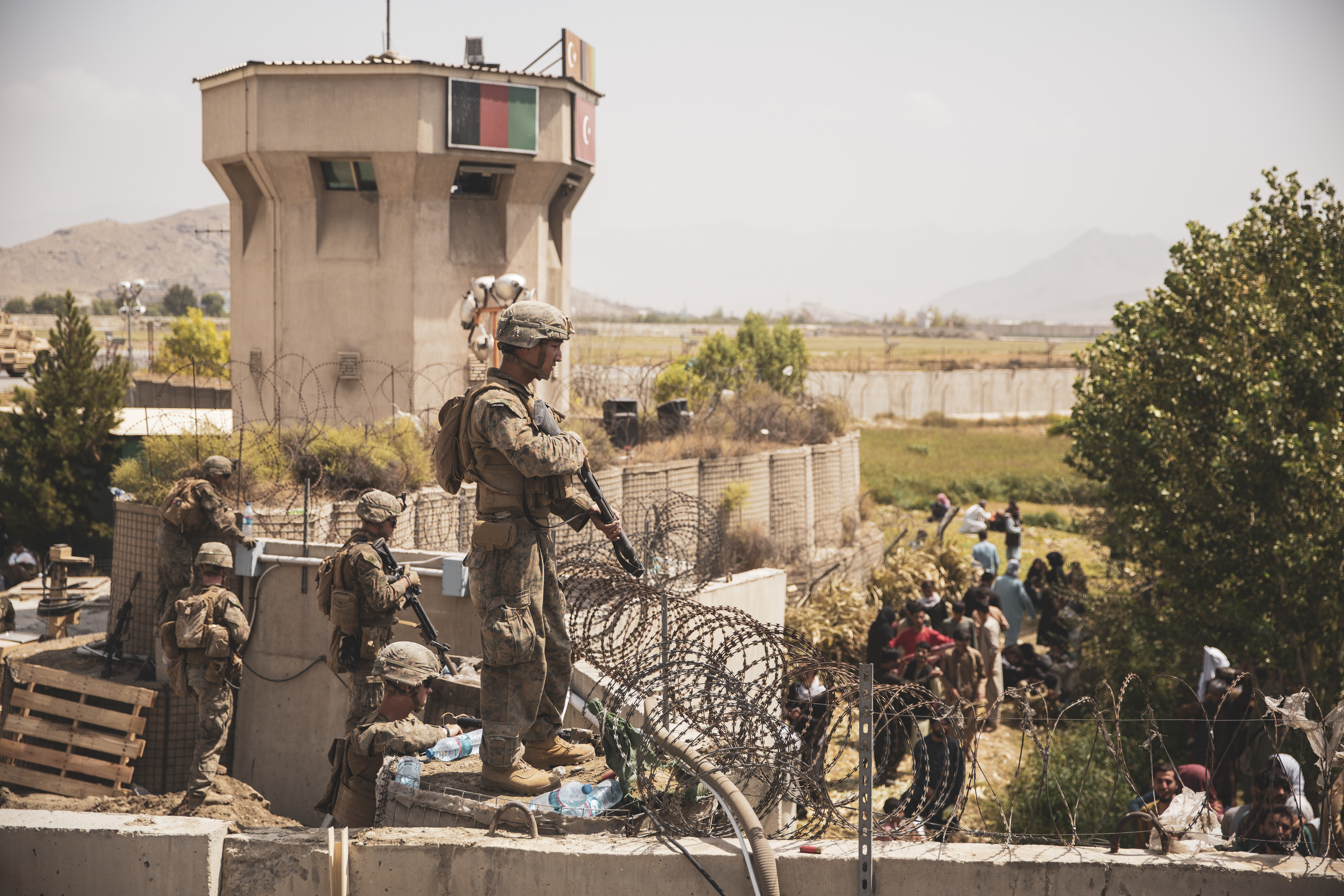
Marines guarding an evacuation checkpoint at Kabul Airport, 20 August 2021

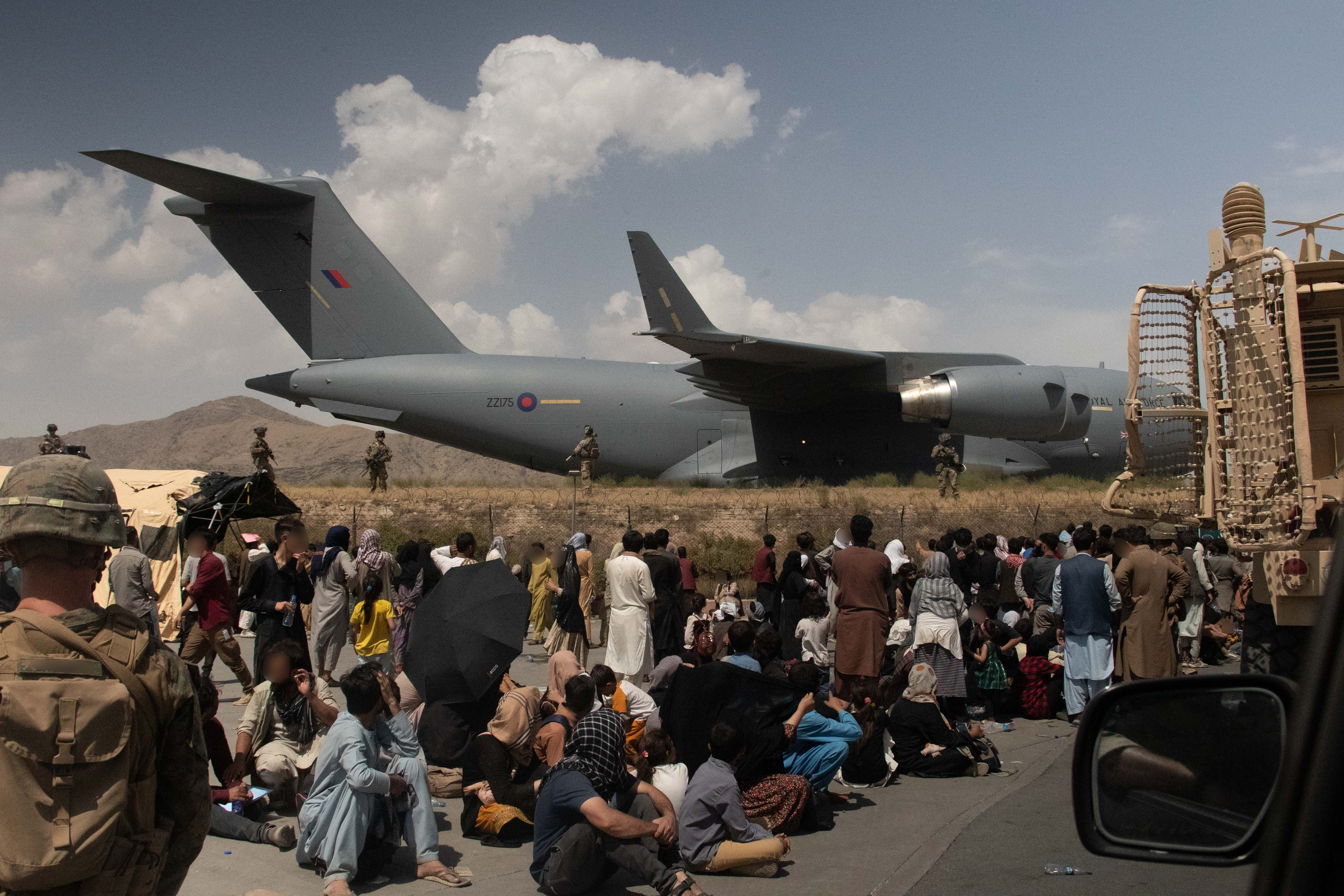
An RAF C-17 assisting with evacuations, 20 August 2021

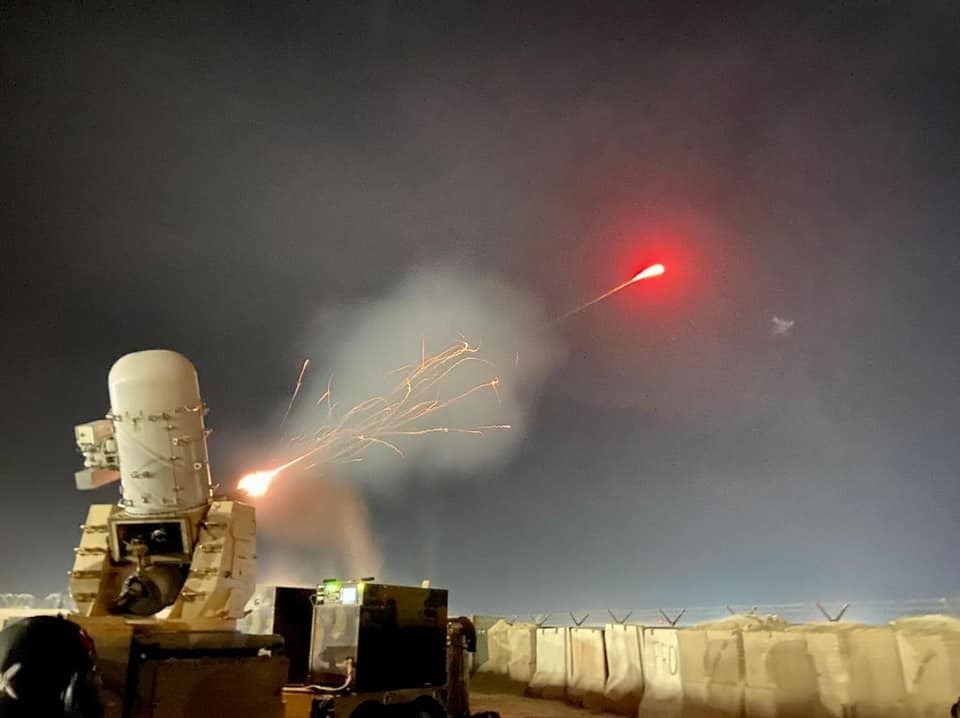
A C-RAM intercepting a rocket attack on Kabul Airport, 30 August 2021

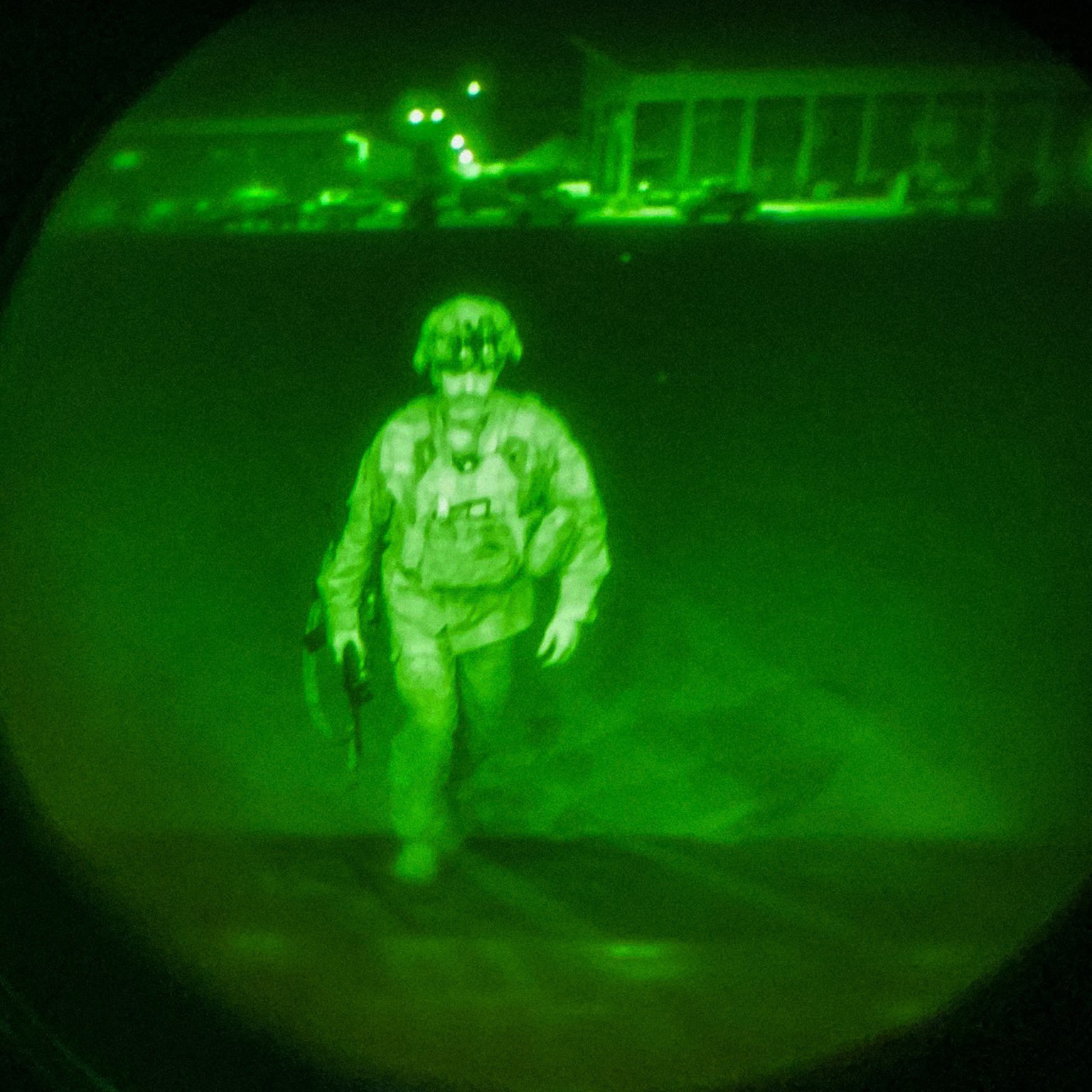
Army Major General Christopher T. Donahue boarding a C-17 at Kabul Airport as the final American soldier to depart Afghanistan, 30 August 2021

On 22 July 2021, the US House of Representatives voted 407–16 to pass the ALLIES Act, a bill that would improve and provide visas for Afghan interpreters who worked for American personnel during the war. The initiative aimed to bring in Afghans under a Special Immigrant Visa (SIV), which would allow them to bring their families and establish work in the United States. The SIV program was first created in 2006 by Congress, for Iraq and Afghan interpreters, with an estimated 50,000 or more individuals qualifying for the program. The first flight of the program arrived on 30 July 2021, with individuals who had qualified for the SIV and family members. While the majority of arrivals were to be relocated either to the United States, US facilities abroad or other countries to finish out the visa applications, the first group were to complete their visa applications at Fort Lee, Virginia, due to prior background checks and security screening.

In August 2021, as the Taliban captured city after city including Lashkar Gah and Kandahar, where the elite forces of the Afghan government were deployed, the Biden Administration continued to defend the withdrawal and their support for the "political process" in Afghanistan, saying it was up to Afghan leaders to "show political will at this point to push back". In the words of the president, "Afghan leaders have to come together".

News from within the Canadian government released on 12 August 2021 confirmed the country sent a small but undisclosed number of special forces to assist the evacuation effort in Kabul and secure the country's embassy. The next day, on 13 August 2021, the Canadian government announced a plan to resettle 20,000 displaced Afghans in Canada.

==== Kabul airlift ====
On 15 August 2021, the Taliban seized the capital city of Kabul as the Afghan government under President Ashraf Ghani dissolved, the speed of which surprised the US government. With Taliban fighters surrounding the city, the US embassy evacuated and retreated to Hamid Karzai International Airport, where fleeing Afghan forces had handed over control to NATO. As the security situation in the city deteriorated, other countries began to shutter and evacuate their respective embassies to the airport, where it became the center of the withdrawal for all US and NATO personnel as it became the only secure route out of Afghanistan. 5,000 US troops and some NATO troops, including British, Italian, Turkish, and Spanish personnel, remained in the city as thousands of fleeing Afghan civilians rushed the airport, overrunning the runway and forcing US troops to conduct crowd control. The US government later authorized the deployment of 1,000 additional troops from the 82nd Airborne to the airport, increasing troop presence in Kabul to 6,000 to facilitate the evacuations. With the fall of Kabul, the military withdrawal evolved into an airlift of all of NATO's diplomatic staff, at-risk Afghan and Western nationals, and eligible refugees able to enter the surrounded Kabul Airport, prompting Western countries to send in additional troops to facilitate the evacuations.

On 16 August, the United Kingdom agreed to send 200 additional troops to Afghanistan, bringing the total number of British troops in the country to 900.

Also on 16 August, following the chaotic start of the Kabul Airport airlifts, President Biden held a press conference in which he justified the reasons for the withdrawal of troops from Afghanistan, affirming his view that following through on the withdrawal was the correct decision. On 18 August, US House Foreign Affairs Committee chair Gregory Meeks (D-NY) called for Biden to delay the withdrawal, stating that the evacuations were a more important priority.

About 650 US troops were in Afghanistan in early August 2021. With the rapid advance of the Taliban in the provinces, on 14 August the US increased its troop commitment to 5,000. On 15 August, with the fall of Kabul, another 1,000 troops were deployed, and on 16 August, another 1,000 troops were deployed, bringing the total number of troops to 7,000.

During some evacuation incidents at the Kabul Airport, the Taliban fired crowd control gunshots and blocked efforts which were made by Britain to carry out evacuations.

On 19 August, the US Navy confirmed that F/A-18E/F Super Hornets from the USS Ronald Reagan—which was sailing in the North Arabian Sea—had been conducting armed overwatch sorties over Kabul, but denied that any low passes, shows of force, or airstrikes had been conducted. This contradicted previous social media reports by journalists and local sources that there had been fighter jets flying low over the city. A day prior, Chairman of the Joint Chiefs of Staff, Mark Milley, confirmed that a variety of air assets were flying similar overwatch missions across Afghanistan, including AC-130 gunships, MQ-9 Reaper drones, F-16C/D Viper fighter jets, B-52H bombers, and AV-8B Harrier jump jets, and that they were poised to provide close air support in case of contingencies, alongside other assets positioned in the region.

On 20 August, President Biden promised Americans stuck in Afghanistan that the US government would bring them home. He stated that the government did not know the exact number of Americans still in Afghanistan and how many of them wanted to return to the United States.

On 23 August, at Biden's direction, Central Intelligence Agency (CIA) director William J. Burns reportedly held a secret meeting in Kabul with Taliban leader Abdul Ghani Baradar, who had returned to Afghanistan from exile in Qatar to discuss the withdrawal's 31 August deadline. The Qataris helped facilitate the meeting, described by a US official as "an exchange of views on what needs to happen to be done". The Qatari government, the CIA, and the White House did not initially comment on the reports.

On 26 August, a suicide bombing occurred at Hamid Karzai International Airport, killing 11 Marines, one Army paratrooper, one Navy Corpsman and 170 Afghan citizens.

The final British flight from Kabul took place on 28 August.

In the early morning hours of 30 August, a US counter rocket, artillery, and mortar (C-RAM) defense system operated by 1st Battalion, 101st Field Artillery Regiment intercepted five rockets launched at the airport, with no reports of casualties. ISIL-K claimed responsibility.

The last US military planes left Afghanistan on 30 August. Major General Christopher T. Donahue was the final American soldier to leave Afghanistan. Following the last US flight, Taliban soldiers entered the airport and declared victory.

In the wake of the flawed Afghanistan withdrawal, Republican lawmakers criticized the Biden administration for not providing closure or accountability to Gold Star families of 13 U.S. service members killed on 26 August 2021. Families shared their stories in a public forum organized by Rep. Darrell Issa, demanding recognition, answers, and responsibility for the tragedy.

== US Forces Afghanistan Forward ==
24th MEU Marines monitoring air traffic control alongside the runway at Kabul Airport, 22 August 2021

About 650 US troops remained on the ground in Afghanistan in early August 2021, keeping to a schedule made months earlier. They were tasked with protecting the airport and embassy. By 12 August, however, as the Taliban had—within just a few days—captured 18 of 34 provincial capitals including Herat and Kandahar, the US and UK said they would send more troops to evacuate embassy staff, other US and UK nationals, and their local translators. For this purpose, the US planned to send 3,000 troops and the UK planned to send 600 troops as part of US Forces Afghanistan Forward. Mazar-i-Sharif was taken by the Taliban on 14 August; on this day, the US increased its troop commitment to 5,000. On 15 August, the Taliban seized Kabul and overthrew the Islamic Republic of Afghanistan, as President Ashraf Ghani fled the country; after which the Taliban took the presidential palace. However, 5,000 US troops still remained in Kabul, and NATO troops were still present at the Hamid Karzai International Airport. The same day, the US government ordered the deployment of 1,000 additional troops from the US Army's 82nd Airborne Division to Afghanistan, bringing the total number of US troops in Kabul to 6,000. On 16 August, President Biden announced the deployment of another thousand members of the 82nd Airborne soldiers and Marines, bringing the total number of troops to over 7,000 in the coming hours. The Navy deployed the USS Essex amphibious readiness group consisting of the landing ships USS Pearl Harbor and USS Portland, who were tasked to bring a special unit of Recon Marines and to load 24th Marine Expeditionary Unit military equipment out of the Middle-East.

Officially, the purpose of the mission was to:

- Protect the US diplomatic presence (Embassy in Kabul) in the country
- Support security requirements at Hamid Karzai International Airport in Kabul
- Provide continued advice and assistance to the Afghan National Defense and Security Forces (ANDSF)
- Support US counter-terrorism efforts

== Equipment losses ==
The United States provided billions of dollars of American military hardware to Afghanistan over 20 years of Military Aid. Over the course of the war in Afghanistan, the federal government spent $89.2 billion to strengthen Afghan security forces. The figure reportedly includes money spent on military equipment and training. Taliban fighters captured much of this equipment from the collapsing Afghan National Army. Around 650,000 weapons were captured from the ANA in Afghanistan. This includes 350,000 M4 and M16 rifles, 65,000 machine guns, 25,000 grenade launchers and 2,500 mortars and howitzers. According to the last CENTCOM update on the withdrawal from Afghanistan, the United States had retrograded "984 C-17 loads of material out of Afghanistan and have turned nearly 17,074 pieces of equipment to the Defense Logistics Agency for disposition." However, a large number of American made weaponry and a considerable number of aircraft were in the hands of the Afghan security forces. When the Taliban began to sweep through the country's districts, before eventually taking over Kabul, they seized much of this material.

== Controversy over withdrawal claim ==
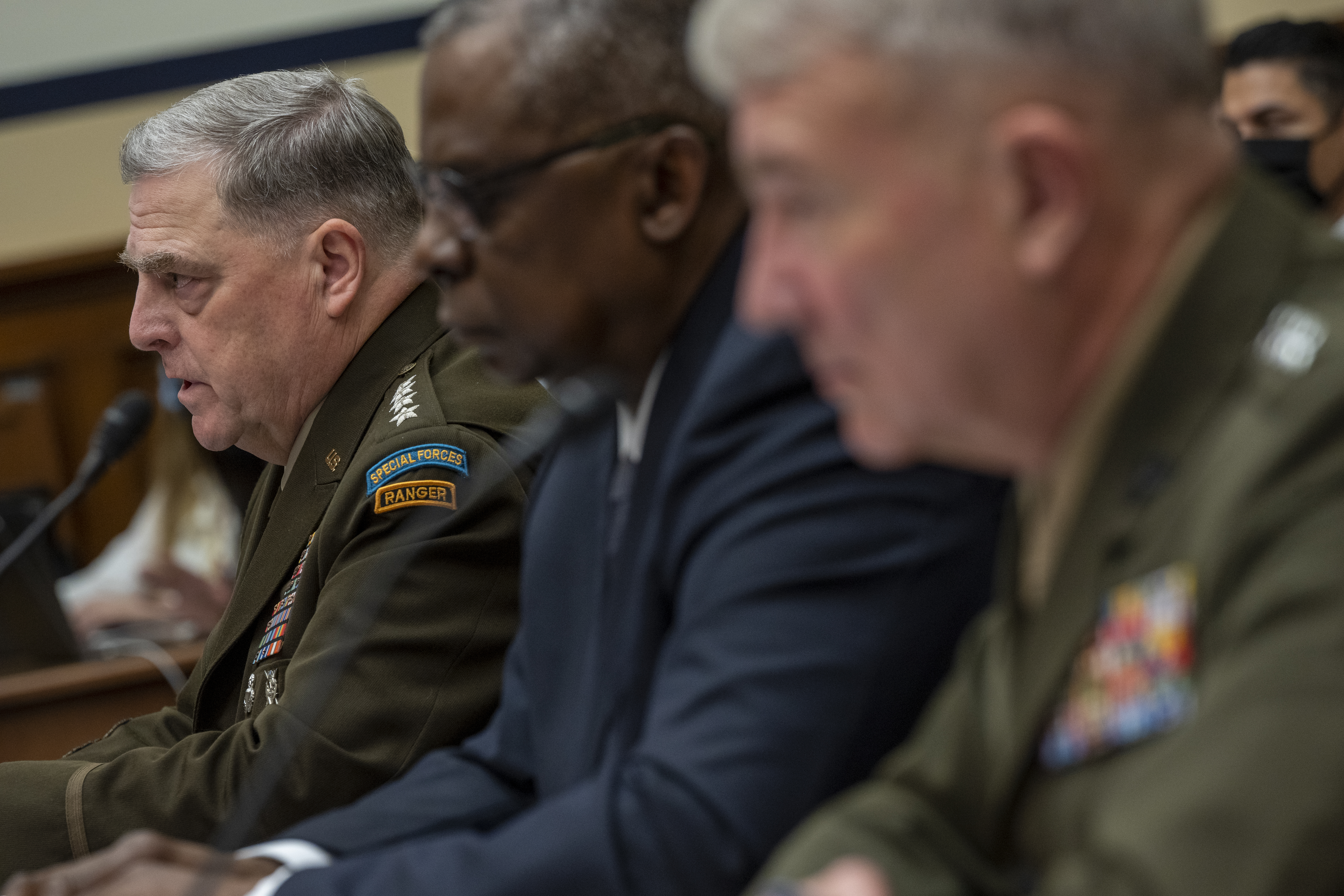
Chairman of the Joint Chiefs of Staff, General Mark A. Milley, Secretary of Defense Lloyd Austin, and CENTCOM commander General Frank McKenzie testifying before Congress on the withdrawal from Afghanistan on 29 September 2021

On 28 September 2021, U.S. secretary of defense Austin, Chairman of the Joint Chiefs of Staff Gen. Milley, CENTCOM Commander Gen. McKenzie and other U.S. Department of Defense officials contradicted during testimony before the U.S. Senate Armed Services Committee President Biden's previous claim which he made in an interview with ABC News journalist George Stephanopolous in August 2021 that he withdrew U.S. troops from Afghanistan based on advice from senior military advisors. Milley testified that he advised the president to accept Gen. Austin Miller's recommendation to keep 2,500 troops in Afghanistan and described Biden's withdrawal plan as a "strategic failure." McKenzie stated that he recommended to President Biden that 2,500 U.S. troops should maintain a presence in Afghanistan and that he also previously recommended to the Trump Administration in the fall of 2020 to keep 4,500 troops at that time. The next day, Austin, Milley and McKenzie would further criticize Biden's Afghanistan withdrawal when they testified before U.S. House Armed Services Committee.

== Analysis ==
According to some media analysts, such as Alexander Nazaryan of Yahoo! News, the withdrawal was included among other actions that Biden broke with both Obama and Trump on, and was seen as maintaining the promise Biden made prior to becoming president that his term would not be "a third Obama term" because "President Trump has changed the landscape". Princeton professor Julian E. Zelizer claimed Biden "clearly learned a great deal from his time in the Obama presidency". The Washington Post journalist Steven Levingston wrote, "Obama listened to military leaders who advised him that withdrawal would be a mistake. Biden, meanwhile, was the top administration official arguing for a much more limited role for American forces in Afghanistan. Later, Biden would go on to say that he could tell by Obama's 'body language' that he agreed with that assessment—even though he ultimately rejected it." Harvard historian James Kloppenberg stated, "Only a fool would have been confident he knew all the answers [when it came to Afghanistan]. Obama was no fool."

The Diplomat reported on 17 April 2021, about the internal and external challenges for Afghanistan following the US troop withdrawal from the perspective of Afghanistan's civil society.

The Washington Post editorial board was critical of the withdrawal in an article dated 2 July 2021, saying the US was allowing its ally to fend for itself against the Taliban with insufficient resources, writing, "the descent from stalemate to defeat could be steep and grim. We wonder whether [Biden] has fully considered the consequences."

David E. Sanger, a correspondent for The New York Times, analyzed the decision to leave Afghanistan by Joe Biden, and consequently the manner of the fall of Kabul, as the result of four basic assumptions, or miscalculations: that there was enough time before the Afghan government collapsed for the US to withdraw, that the Afghan forces had "the same drive" to win as the Taliban did, that there was "a well-planned system for evacuating the embassy" and Afghans who had helped the US and their families, and that if the Taliban made it to Kabul, that there would be a "bloody block-by-block civil war" taking place in its streets. A report from the US Special Inspector General for Afghanistan Reconstruction released on 17 August 2021 found that the US had "struggled to develop and implement a coherent strategy" for the war and that "if the goal was to rebuild and leave a country that could sustain itself and pose little threat to US national security interests, the overall picture is bleak". The report also found that the US prioritised internal political interests instead of Afghan interests, that it had demonstrated ignorance of local context, and had wasted billions of dollars on unsustainable and bureaucratic projects.

On 22 August 2021, The Daily Telegraph reported that "President Joe Biden's aides were 'too scared' to question him on key decisions made in the run-up to the US withdrawal from Afghanistan, sources close to the administration have told The Telegraph."

== Reactions ==
=== Domestic ===
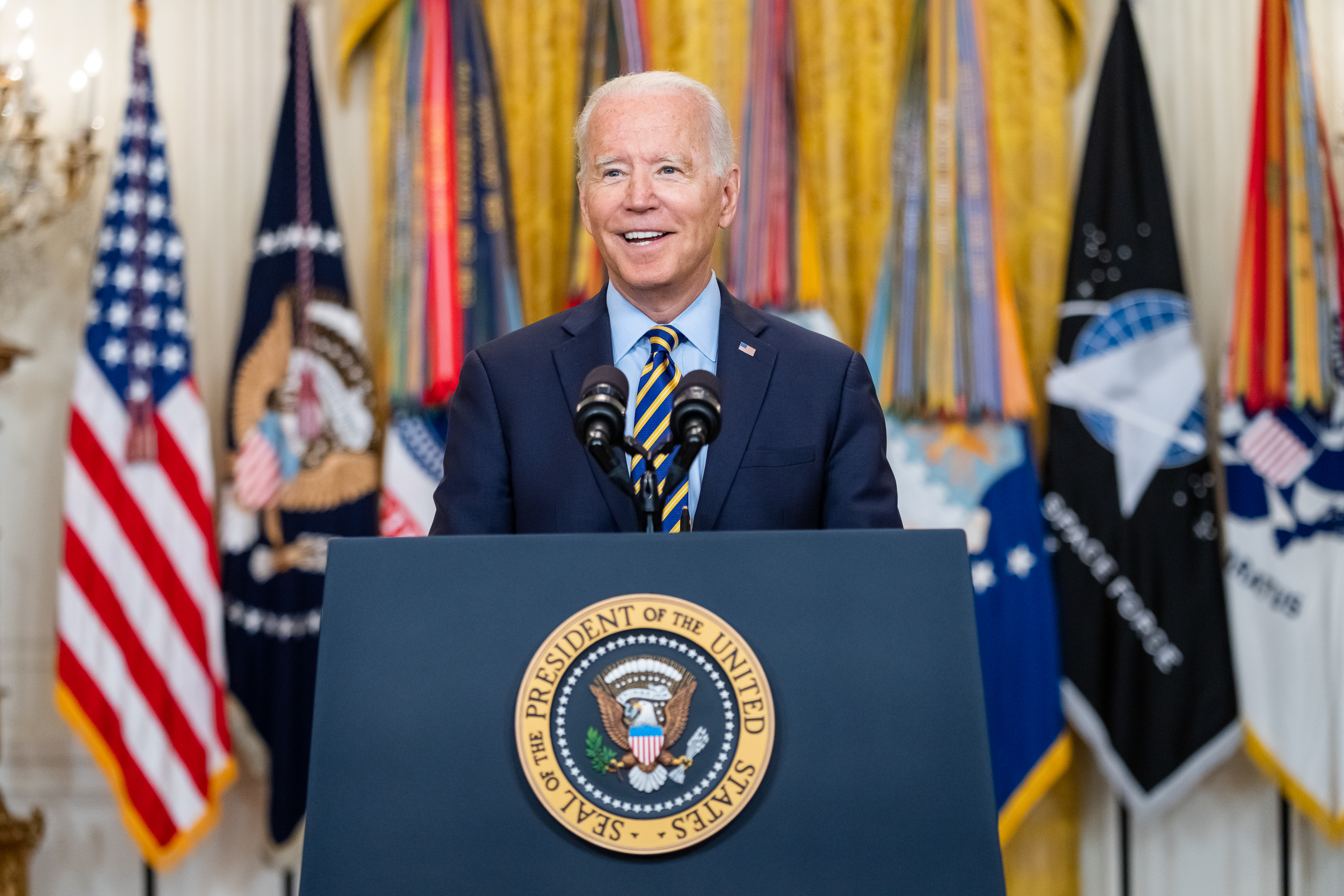
On 8 July 2021, US president Joe Biden stated that, "The likelihood there's going to be the Taliban overrunning everything and owning the whole country is highly unlikely."

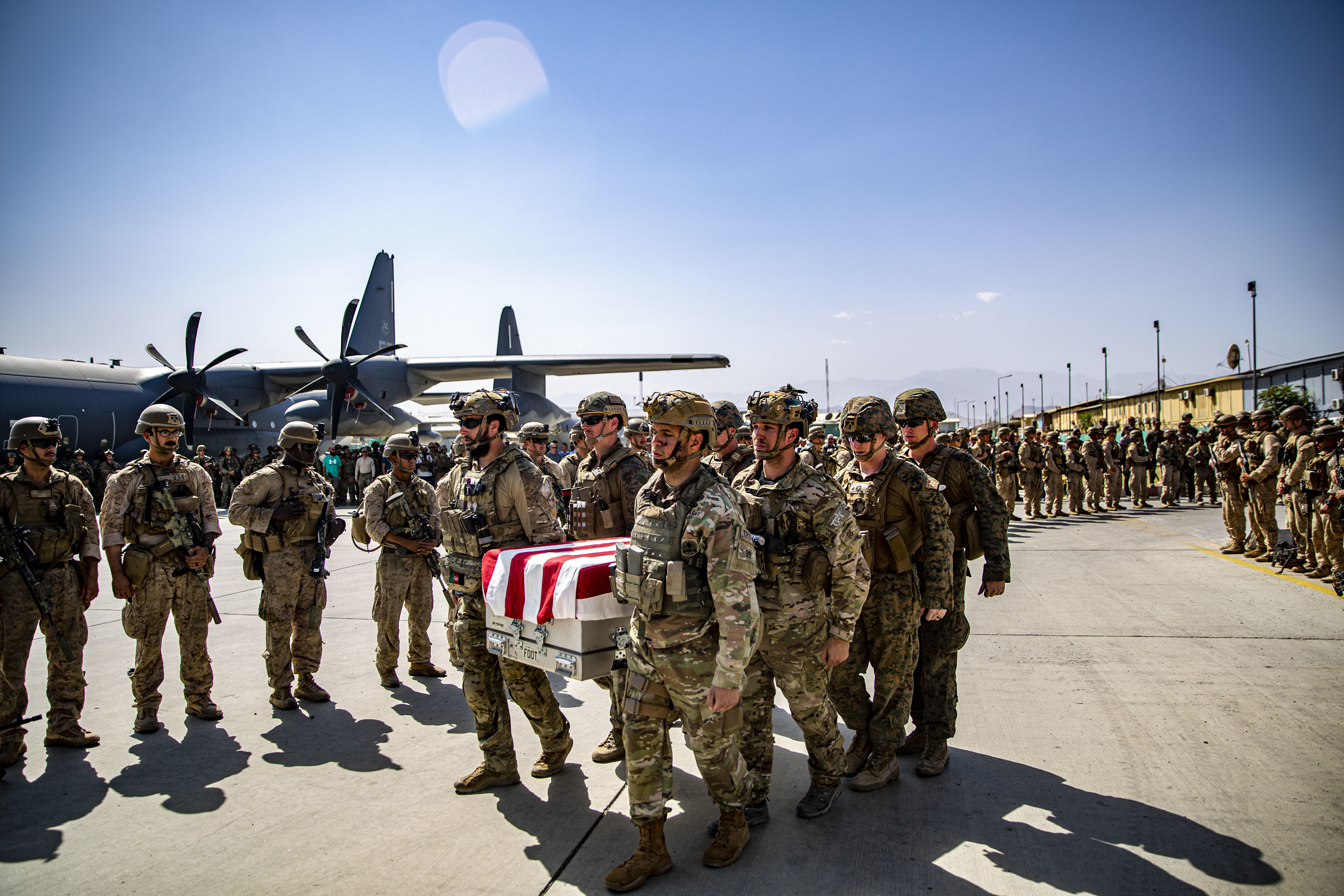
Joint Task Force-Crisis Response personnel carrying the remains of fellow service members killed in the Kabul Airport attack, 27 August 2021

The Biden administration's initial announcement of a full withdrawal of troops by 11 September 2021, generated both criticism and praise within the US. Senators Mitch McConnell, Lindsey Graham, Jim Inhofe, Mitt Romney, Joni Ernst, and Jeanne Shaheen criticized the withdrawal, while Patrick Leahy, Barbara Lee, Elizabeth Warren, Bernie Sanders, Ro Khanna, Rand Paul and Jack Reed supported the decision. Former president Donald Trump, while maintaining that withdrawal was "a wonderful and positive thing to do," criticized Biden for choosing 11 September as the day of the withdrawal, criticizing the deadline extension as "we can and should get out earlier," calling for the US to withdraw "as close" to 1 May as possible, and that 11 September "should remain a day of reflection and remembrance honoring those great souls we lost." Former US secretary of state Hillary Clinton said that there were "consequences both foreseen and unintended of staying and of leaving"; one of these consequences, she expressed, was a potential collapse of the Afghan government, resulting in a takeover by the Taliban and a fresh civil war. Former president George W. Bush, who oversaw the US invasion of Afghanistan in 2001, said the withdrawal made him "concerned" and that he believed it had the potential to "create a vacuum, and into that vacuum is likely to come people who treat women as second class citizens." During an interview with Deutsche Welle on 14 July 2021, Bush reaffirmed his opposition to the troop withdrawal. Trump also reaffirmed his criticism of Biden's handling of the withdrawal in an interview with Fox News anchor Sean Hannity, calling it "the dumbest move ever made in U.S. history" and claiming that his negotiation with Taliban leader Abdul Ghani Baradar accomplished more. British conservative author and commentator Douglas Murray strongly criticized the withdrawal and the Biden White House attempting to portray it as a success.

The Boston Globe columnist Jeff Jacoby criticised the idea that the 2,500 troops in Afghanistan constituted a "forever war" that needed to end, pointing out that U.S. troops have been in Germany since 1945, with 35,000 there in 2021, and more troops currently in Korea, Djibouti, Bahrain, and Spain than Afghanistan. Jacoby argued the U.S. presence should have continued, citing accomplishments like successful suppression of the Taliban, halving of infant mortality, tripling access to electricity, a ten-fold increase in school attendance, and the inclusion of girls in education.

Following the fall of Kabul and collapse of the Afghanistan government on 15 August 2021, the Biden administration's withdrawal plan received bipartisan domestic backlash. President Biden's approval rating dropped to 41% and only 26% of Americans said they supported Biden's handling of the situation in Afghanistan. Some Republicans, including Senator Josh Hawley, Congresswoman Marsha Blackburn, and former Ambassador Nikki Haley, called on Biden to resign. Numerous fellow Democrats in Congress, including chairs of some important congressional committees, also criticized Biden's handling of the withdrawal. Former secretary of defense and CIA director Leon Panetta, who oversaw the raid which successfully killed Osama bin Laden, compared Biden's poor withdrawal planning to that of how former US president John F. Kennedy handled the 1961 Bay of Pigs Invasion. Jordain Carney of The Hill wrote on 18 August 2021 that Biden now had "few Capitol Hill allies" amid the Afghanistan backlash. During an interview with ABC News, Biden defended his decision to withdraw from Afghanistan, and insisted that chaos during the withdrawal was an inevitability.

Former presidents George W. Bush, Barack Obama, and Donald Trump, each of whom had overseen significant developments in the war, also faced criticism after the fall of Kabul. Former Trump secretary of defense Christopher C. Miller criticized Biden's choice of sticking to a withdrawal date, stating in an interview with CNN anchor Chris Cuomo that while the Trump administration was leaning towards a withdrawal, no date was fixed, stating "We felt we had the ability to move the goal posts if we needed to on that one, in a way." In the UK, Foreign Secretary Dominic Raab faced calls to resign after it was revealed he had gone on holiday to Greece just prior to the fall and had refused attempts to contact him as developments occurred.

Some white nationalists and related extremists celebrated the Taliban takeover and American withdrawal on social media. White nationalist Nick Fuentes posted on the Telegram messaging service, "The Taliban is a conservative, religious force, the US is godless and liberal. The defeat of the US government in Afghanistan is unequivocally a positive development." Some experts warned American extremists would use events in Afghanistan to push disinformation, organize and recruit.

Stuart Scheller Jr., a United States Marine Corps lieutenant colonel, was relieved of command after asking for his superiors to take responsibility for murdering innocents for profit and leaving his fellow troops and innocents behind in Afghanistan. He posted a video to Facebook demanding U.S. military leadership take responsibility after the 2021 Fall of Kabul, and was placed in the brig after refusing to take down his social media posts. His calls for accountability were replayed by major TV hosts and outlets such as Tucker Carlson and CBS News. His imprisonment was reported by media including Fox News, The Independent, Daily Mail, and New York Post. Republican members of Congress called for his release from pretrial confinement. Scheller was released from confinement on 5 October 2021.

On October 14, 2021, Scheller pleaded guilty to all six misdemeanor-level charges. On 15 October, he was issued a letter of reprimand and a forfeiture of $5,000 of pay. The judge stated he did not condone Scheller's offenses, but noted Scheller's 17-year United States Marine Corps career as an officer with an outstanding record. ABC News reported Scheller's concerns that around 50 U.S.-trained former Afghan Air Force helicopter pilots were still trapped and left behind in Afghanistan and pleading for the United States government to evacuate them from the country, where they fear they face execution if found by the Taliban.

==== White House report and subsequent congressional actions ====
On April 6, 2023, the Biden White House put out its report on the August 2021 withdrawal of U.S. forces from Afghanistan. The 12 page report was compiled by the National Security Council based on the after-action reviews conducted by the State Department and the Defense Department.

On September 24, 2024, the House Foreign Affairs Committee voted to recommend U.S. secretary of state Blinken be held in contempt of Congress for failing to comply with a subpoena seeking information about the 2021 U.S. withdrawal from Afghanistan.

On September 25, 2024, the United States House of Representatives passed a resolution condemning the Biden-Harris Administration for the U.S. withdrawal from Afghanistan. The resolution passed 219 - 194, with 10 Democrats and all Republicans voting in favor.

=== International ===
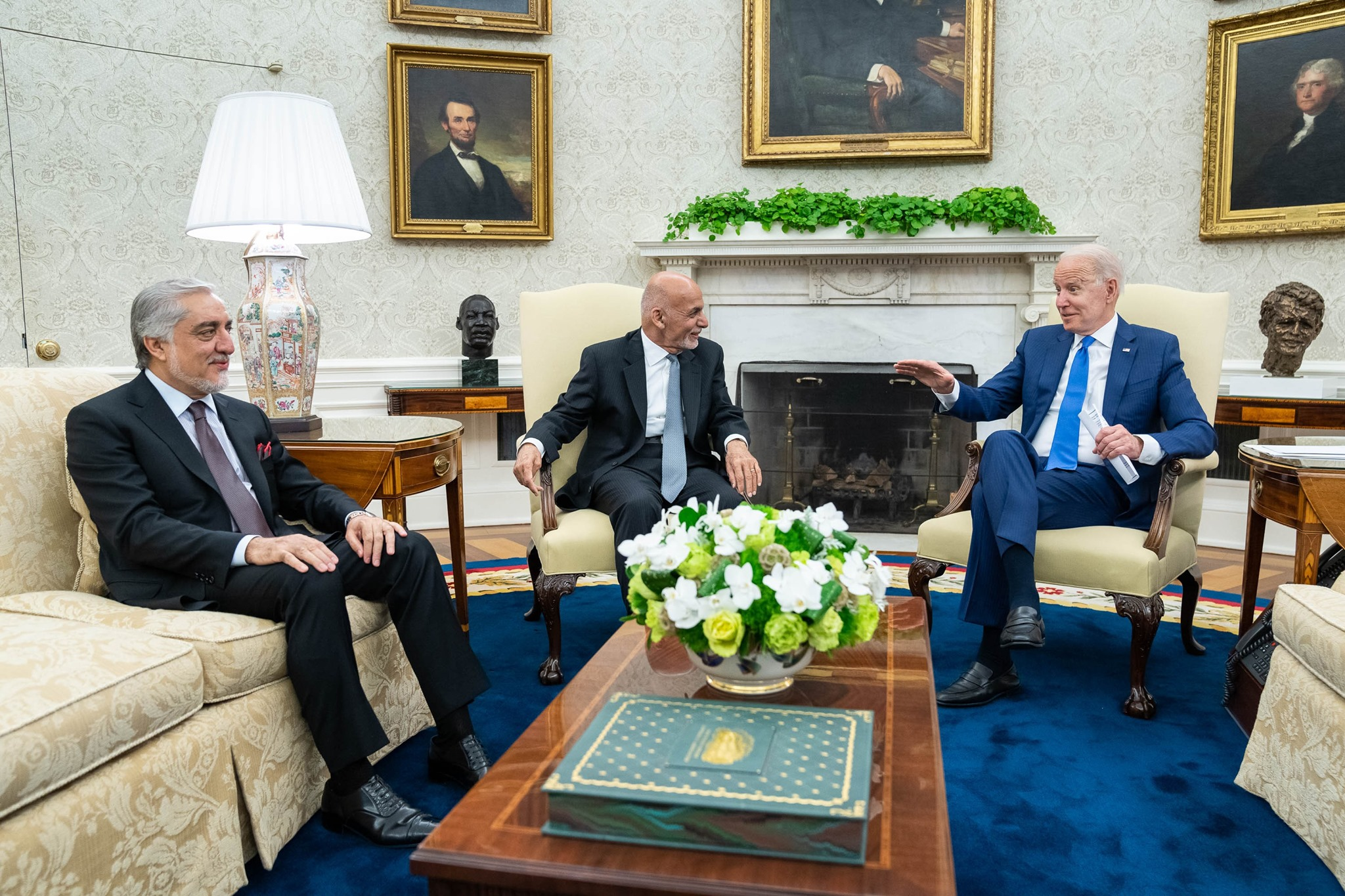
President Joe Biden meeting with Afghan president Ashraf Ghani and Chairman Abdullah Abdullah, 25 June 2021

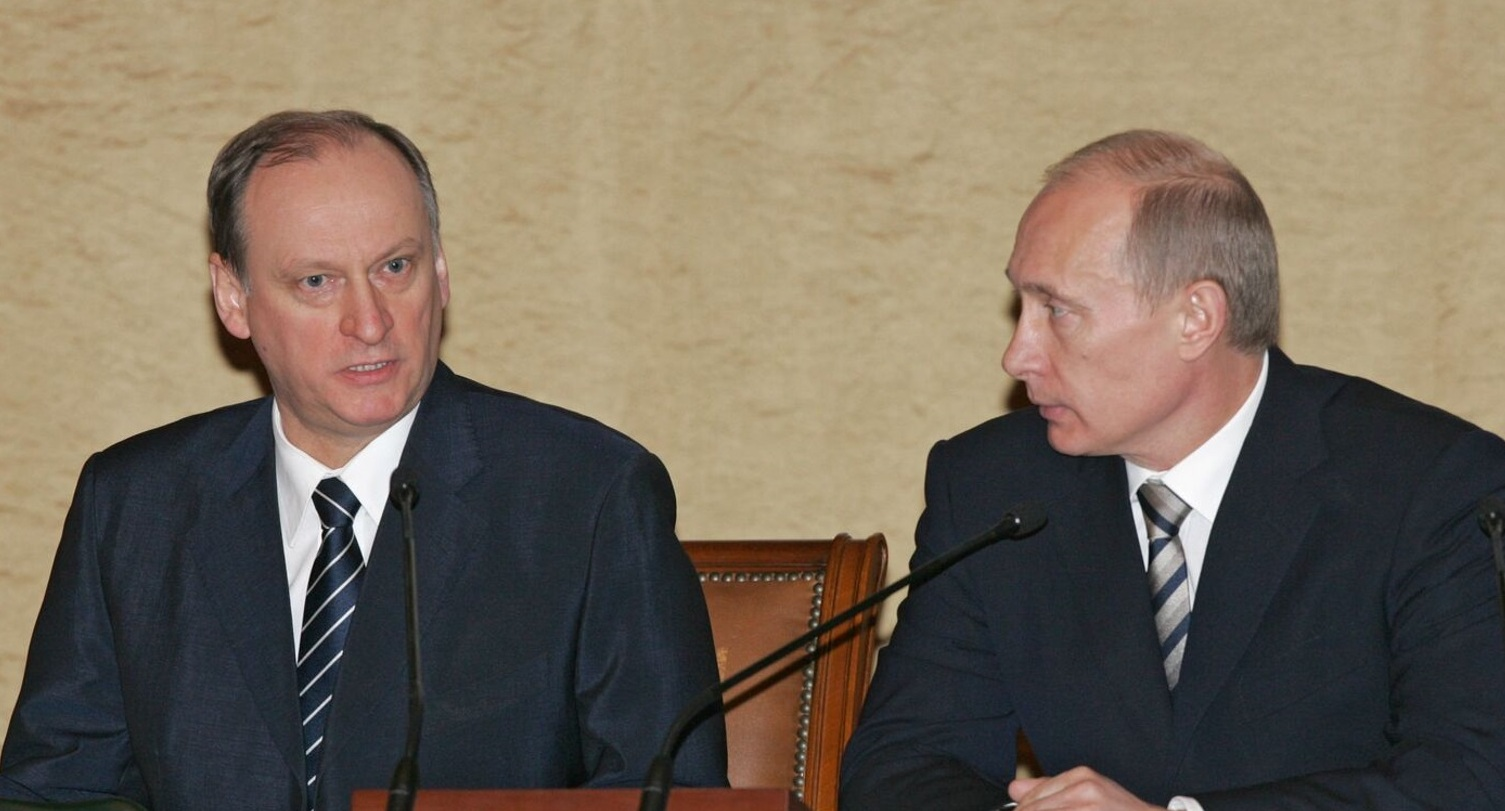
In August 2021, Putin's national security adviser Nikolai Patrushev came to the conclusion that "the United States would abandon its allies in Ukraine, just as it abandoned its allies in Afghanistan."

On 25 May 2021, Australia closed its embassy in Kabul due to security concerns. Belgium and France withdrew their diplomats. On 10 May, France began evacuating Afghans working for the country. The Chinese Embassy in Afghanistan issued a travel warning on 19 June, urging Chinese citizens to "leave Afghanistan as soon as possible" and demanding Chinese organizations to "take extra precautions and strengthen their emergency preparedness as the situation deteriorated" in the country. The Chinese government dispatched a charter-flight operated by XiamenAir to evacuate 210 Chinese nationals from Kabul on 2 July.

The two presidents of Afghanistan after the 2001 invasion, Hamid Karzai and Ashraf Ghani, both criticized the "abrupt" withdrawal of US troops from the country as giving momentum to the Taliban advance, with Karzai calling on the United States to "end this failed mission". At the 2021 Raisina Dialogue, Mohammad Javad Zarif, the Foreign Minister of Iran, said that the withdrawal was a welcome move, adding that foreign troops could not bring peace in Afghanistan.

British secretary of state for defence Ben Wallace said the US put Britain in a "very difficult position" following the withdrawal, though they subsequently followed suit. The chaotic withdrawal from Afghanistan had a negative impact on United Kingdom–United States relations, with the British government briefing media against the American government. The fall of Afghanistan also had a negative impact on United States–European Union relations. Former prime minister of the United Kingdom, Tony Blair, condemned the US withdrawal, stating that the US' decision to leave was "political" rather than "strategic". In an article on the website of Tony Blair Institute for Global Change, he wrote, "The abandonment of Afghanistan and its people is tragic, dangerous, unnecessary, not in their interests and not in ours." Blair further accused Biden of being "in obedience to an imbecilic political slogan about ending 'the forever wars'," and warned that "The world is now uncertain of where the West stands because it is so obvious that the decision to withdraw from Afghanistan in this way was driven not by grand strategy but by politics."

Nikolai Patrushev, the secretary of the Security Council of Russia, told the Izvestia newspaper that the United States abandoned its Afghan allies, saying that the reason for the military victory of the Taliban was the incompetent work of the intelligence services of the United States, Britain and other NATO countries and the typical misplaced belief of the West in the rightness of its decisions. He predicted that the United States would also abandon its allies in Ukraine, saying that "...Kyiv is obsequiously serving the interests of its overseas patrons, striving to get into NATO. But was the ousted pro-American regime in Kabul saved by the fact that Afghanistan had the status of a principal U.S. ally outside NATO? (No). A similar situation awaits supporters of the American choice in Ukraine."

== See also ==
- Coalition casualties in Afghanistan
- Departure Day
- Fall of Saigon
- Soviet withdrawal from Afghanistan
- Withdrawal of United States troops from Iraq (2020–2021)
