= Afghan Independence Day =

National holiday in Afghanistan

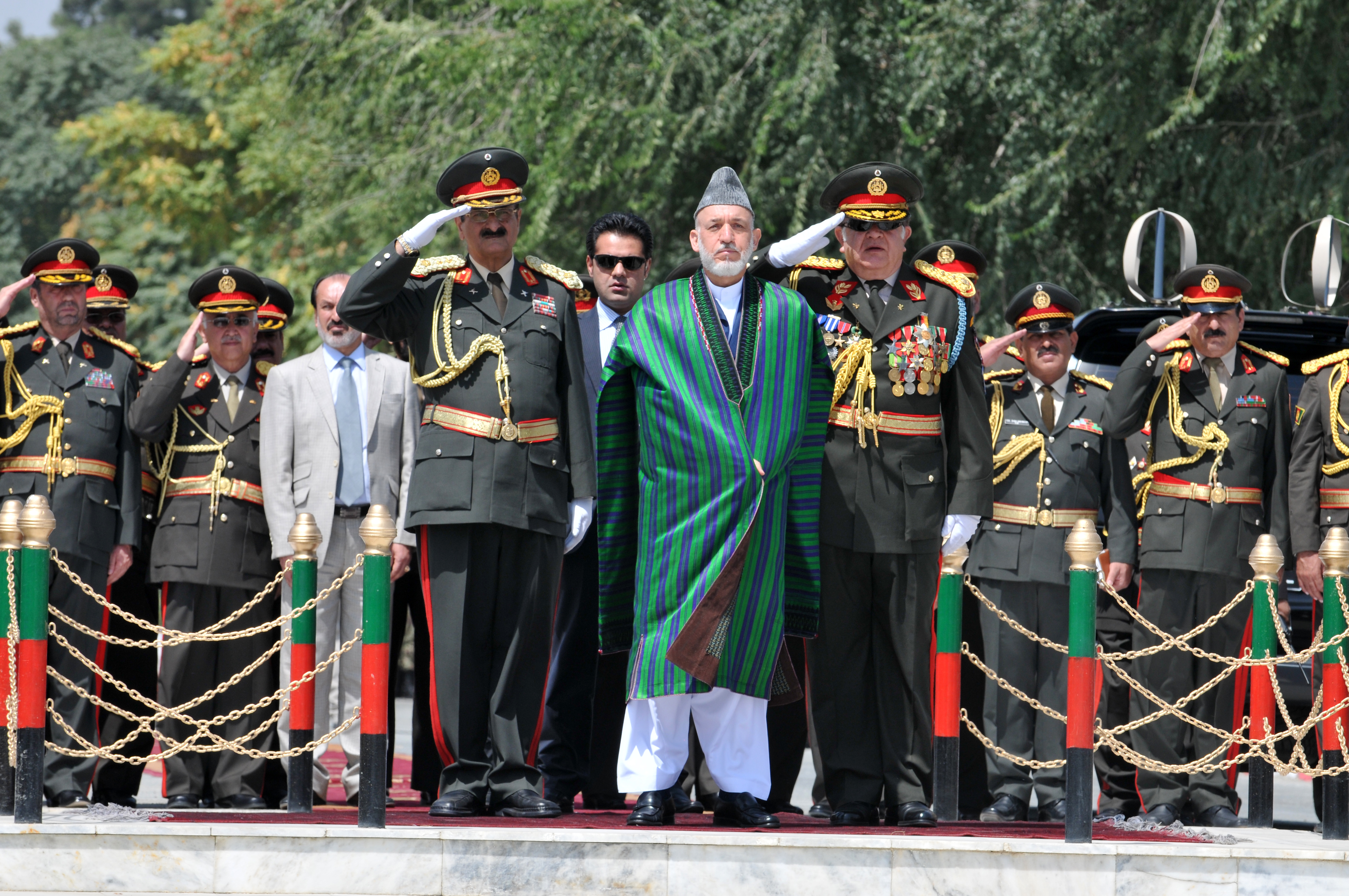
- President Hamid Karzai observing the honor guard of the Afghan Armed Forces during the 2011 Afghan Independence Day in Kabul
- Observed by: Afghanistan
- Liturgical color: Black, red, green
- Significance: Marks Afghanistan's regaining of full independence from British influence in 1919
- Date: 19 August, 20 August (28 Asad)
- Frequency: annual
- First time: 1919
- Started by: Amanullah Khan
- Related to: Anglo-Afghan Treaty of 1919

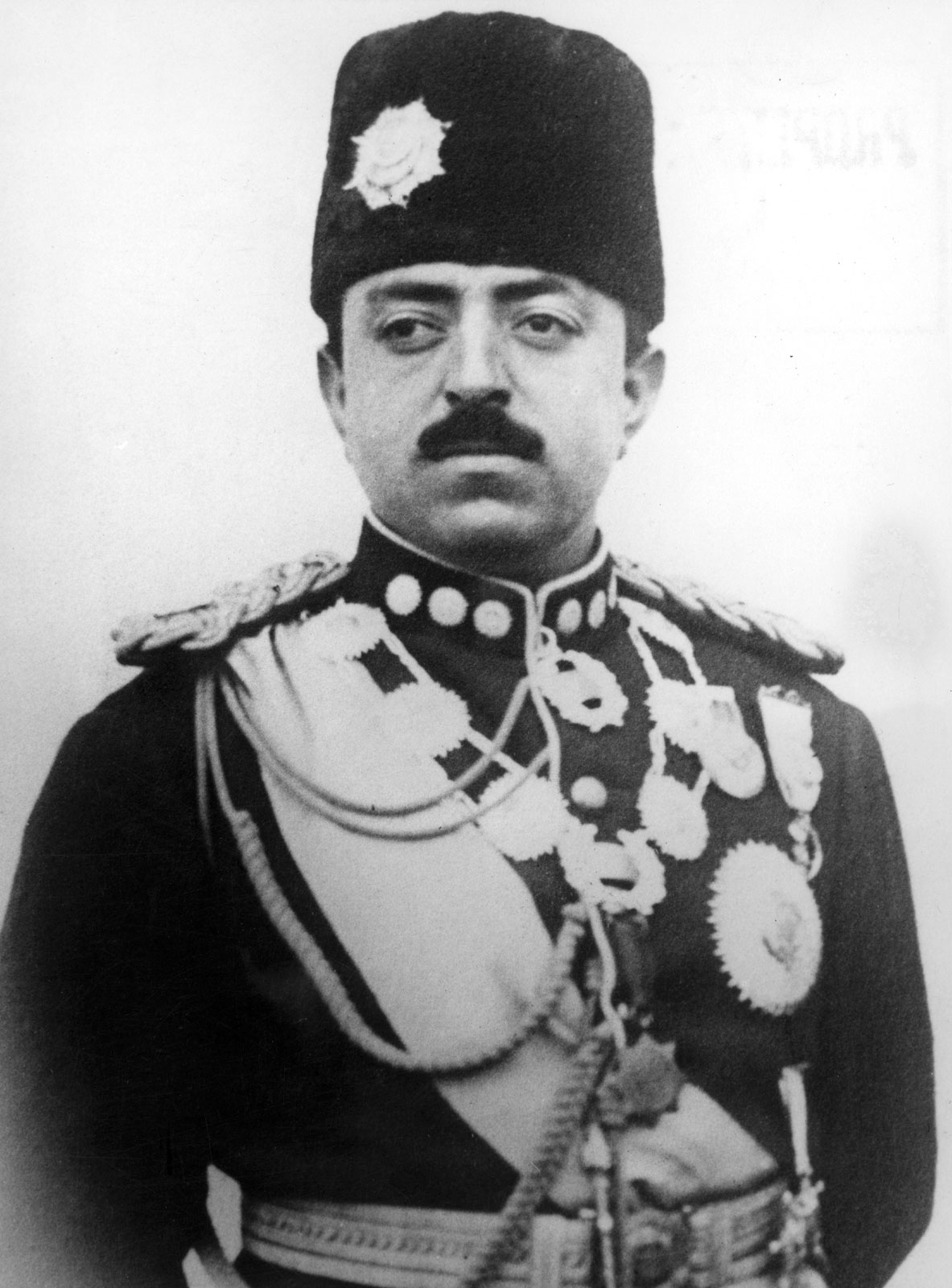
Amanullah Khan, then Afghan emir who proclaimed Afghan liberation

Afghan Independence Day (Pashto: د افغانستان د خپلواکۍ ورځ, romanized: Də Afğānistān də Xpəlwākəy Wraź; Dari: روز استقلال افغانستان, romanized: Rōz-i Istiqlāl-i Afğānistān), locally known as Afghan Liberation Day, is celebrated as a national holiday in Afghanistan on 19 August to commemorate the Anglo-Afghan Treaty of 1919 and the relinquishment from its de-jure British protected-state status. The treaty established a completely neutral relation between the Emirate of Afghanistan and the United Kingdom and was the start of Afghanistan's relations with other countries, as well as Amanullah Khan's modernization campaigns.

== Background ==
The First Anglo-Afghan War (1839–42) led to the British force taking and occupying Kabul. After this, due to strategic errors by Elphinstone, the British force was annihilated by Afghan forces under the command of Akbar Khan somewhere at the Kabul–Jalalabad Road, near the city of Jalalabad. After this defeat, the British-Indian forces returned to Afghanistan on a special mission to rescue their prisoners of war (POWs) and then withdrew. The British returned later in the Second Anglo-Afghan War.

At the conclusion of the Second Anglo-Afghan War (1878–80), Abdur Rahman Khan who was an opponent to the British, became the new emir and established friendly British-Afghan relations. The British were given control of Afghanistan's foreign affairs in exchange for the prevention of a British resident in Kabul, as was one of the British objectives, and protection against the Russians and Persians.

In 1919, the Third Anglo-Afghan War led the British to give up control of Afghanistan's foreign affairs.

== Observances ==
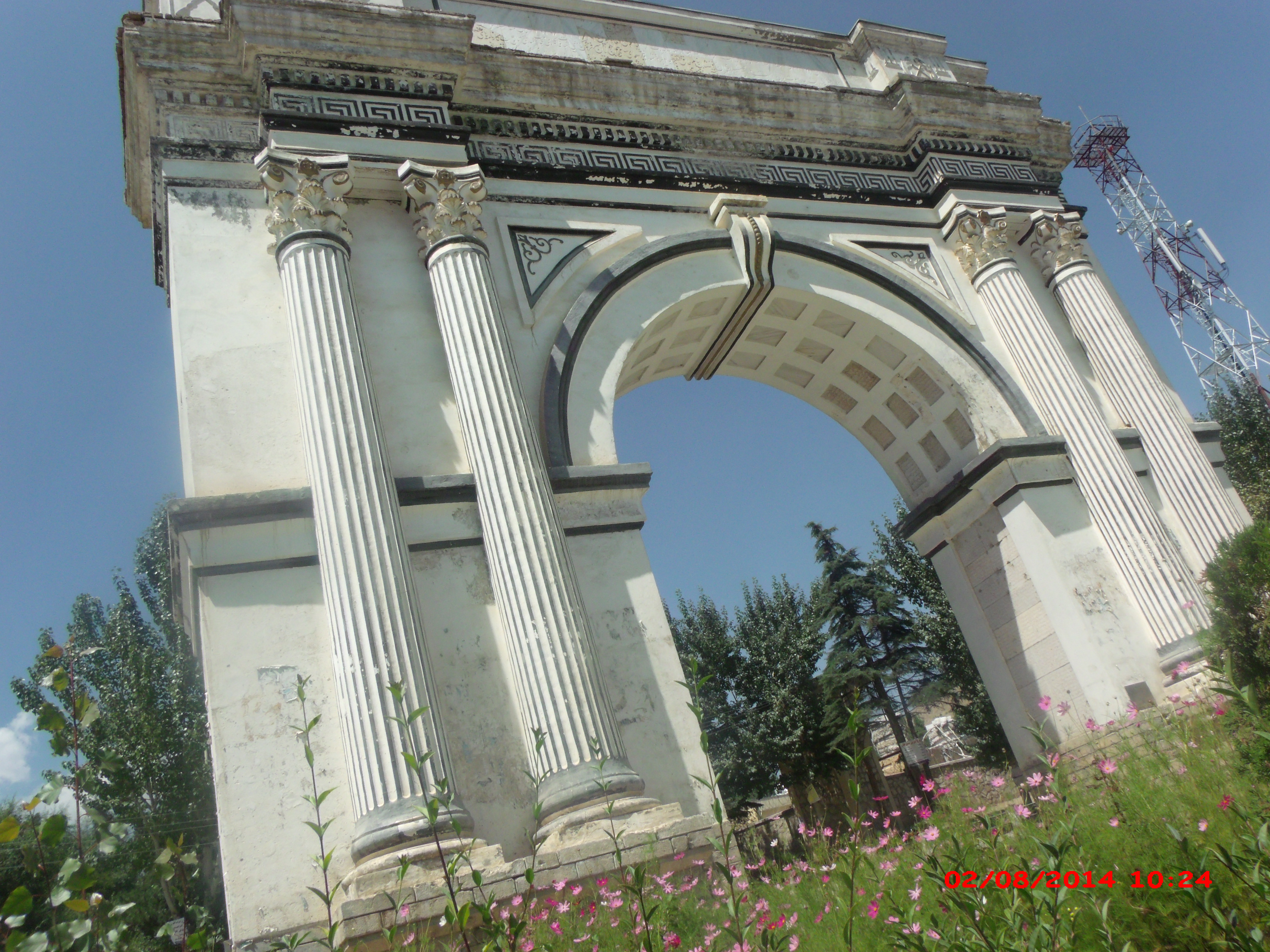
The Paghman victory arch, which commemorates the war against the United Kingdom

- The Taq-e Zafar was built in Paghman to commemorate independence in 1928.
- At the centenary anniversary in 2019, some international landmarks hoisted the Afghan flag tricolor, including the world's tallest building Burj Khalifa in Dubai. The day also coincidenced with the completion of the renovation of the Darul Aman Palace in Kabul, where official celebrations took place.
- On 15 August 2021, the Taliban captured Kabul and reinstated the Islamic Emirate of Afghanistan. During the Afghan Independence Day rallies in Jalalabad and other cities on 18 and 19 August, the Taliban killed three people and injured over a dozen others for removing Taliban flags and displaying the tricolor Afghan flags.

== Gallery ==
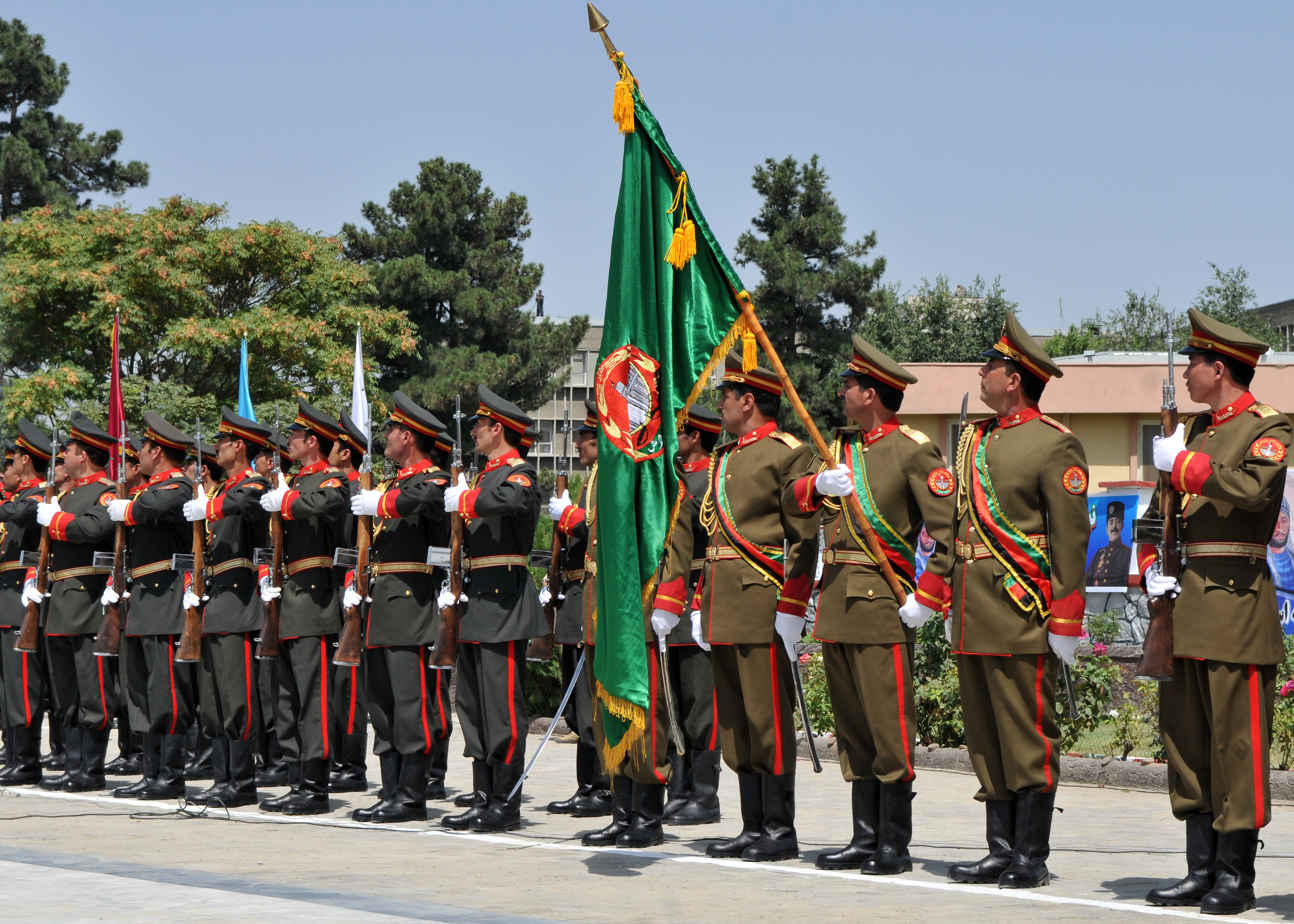
2011

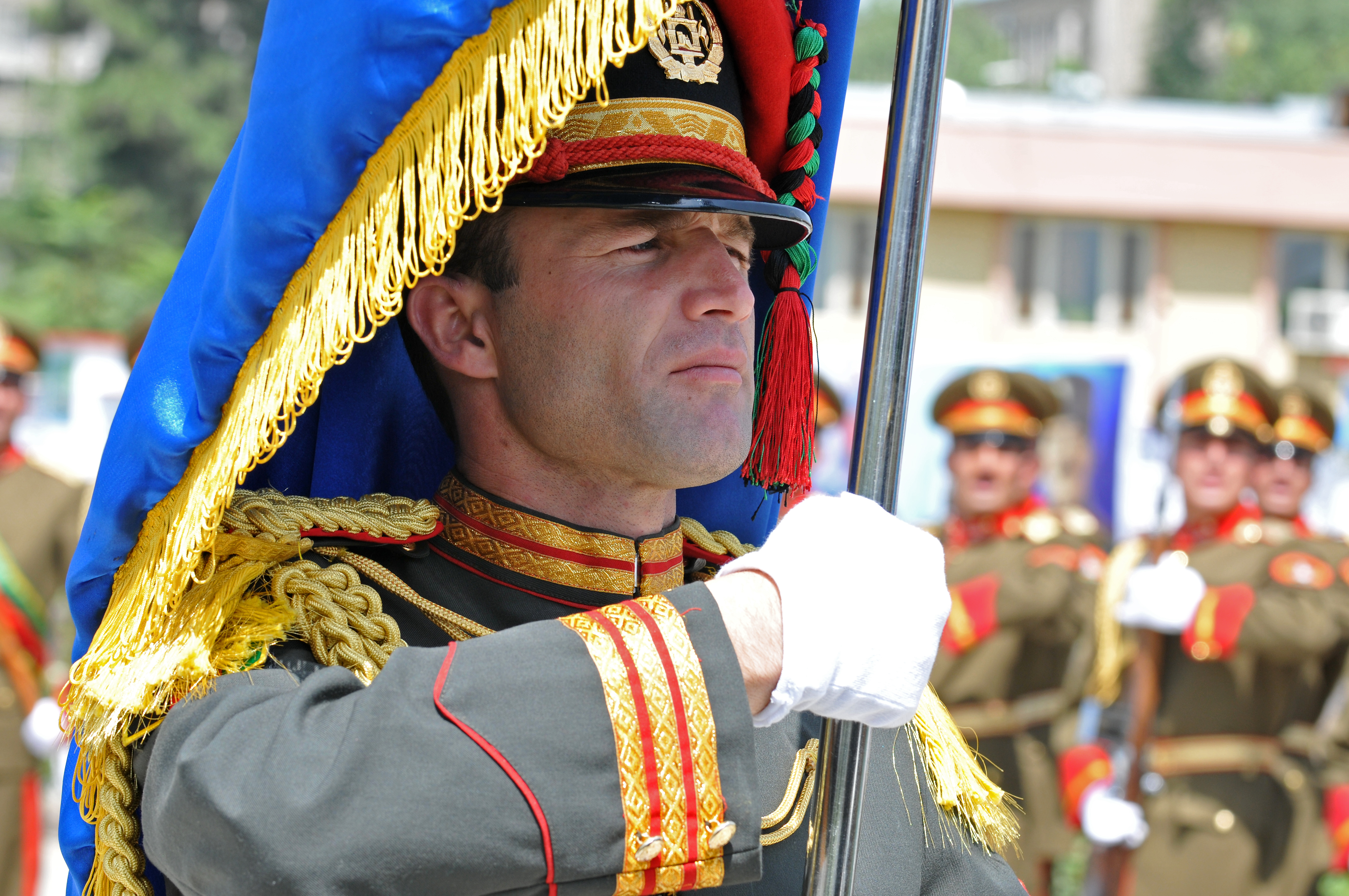
2011

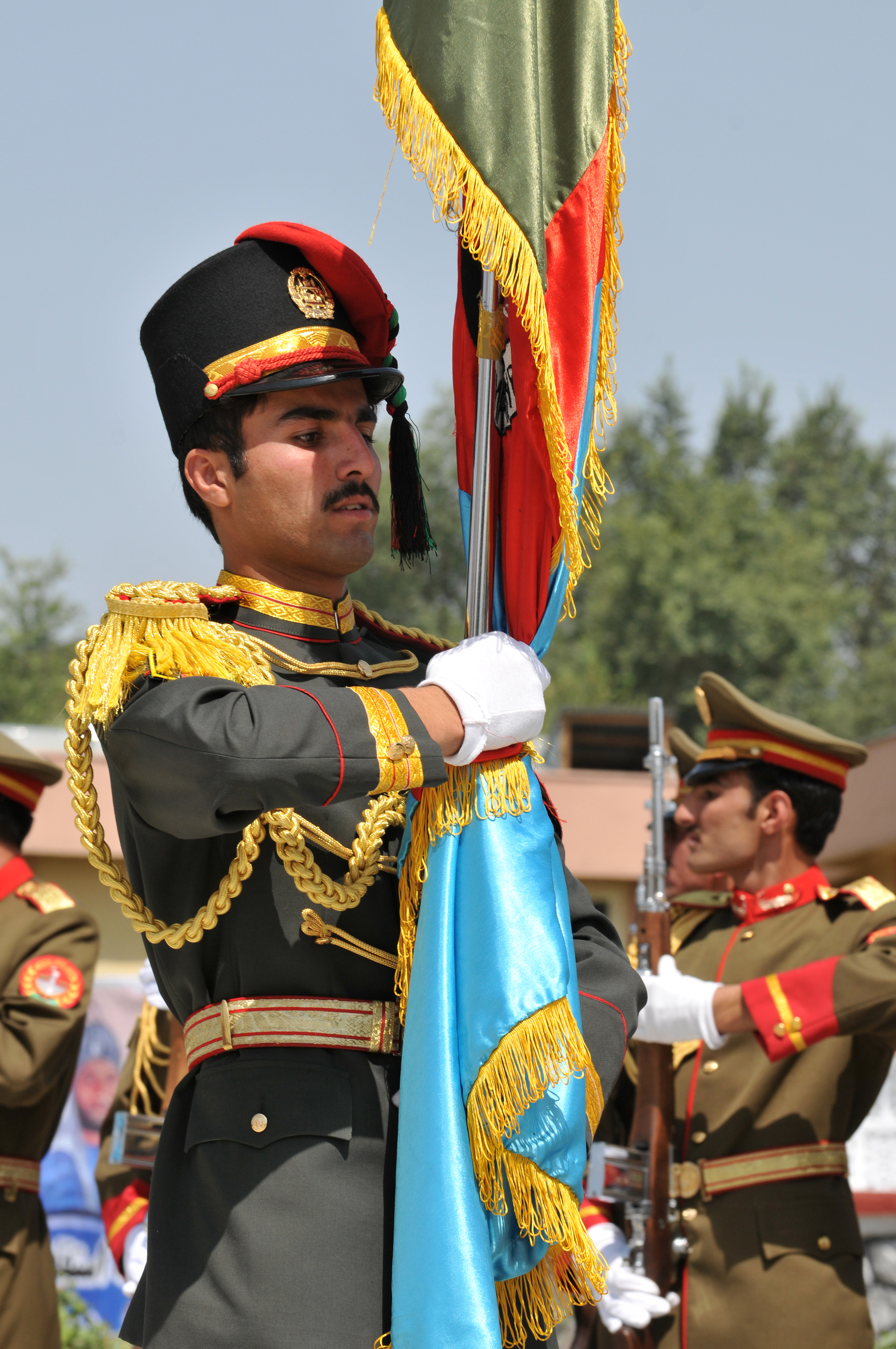
2011

== See also ==
- Culture of Afghanistan
- Hotak dynasty
- Durrani Empire
