= 2024 in Afghanistan =

- Decades: 2000s; 2010s; 2020s
- See also: Other events of 2024; List of years in Afghanistan

Events in the year 2024 in Afghanistan.

== Incumbents ==
Photo	Post	Name	Dates
	Supreme Leader	Hibatullah Akhundzada	15 August 2021 – present
	Acting Prime Minister	Hasan Akhund	7 September 2021 – present
	Chief Justice	Abdul Hakim Haqqani	15 August 2021 – present
Haqqani / Yaqoob; Baradar	Deputy Leader	Sirajuddin Haqqani (first); Mullah Yaqoob (second); Abdul Ghani Baradar (third)	15 August 2021 – present
Baradar / Hanafi; Kabir	Acting Deputy Prime Minister	Abdul Ghani Baradar (first); Abdul Salam Hanafi (second); Abdul Kabir (third)	7 September 2021 – present

== Events ==
=== Ongoing ===
Afghan conflict; Islamic State–Taliban conflict; Republican insurgency in Afghanistan

=== January ===
- January 4 – A spokesman for the Vice and Virtue Ministry of the Taliban announces the arrest of an undetermined number of women for wearing "bad hijab", in the first known crackdown on dress code since their return to power in August 2021.
- January 20 – A chartered Dassault Falcon 10 aircraft flying from Thailand to Russia crashes in Kuf Ab District, Badakhshan Province, killing two of the six people on board.
- January 29 – Ten collisions occur on the main highway linking Kabul and Nangarhar Province, killing 17 people and wounding ten more. Separately, fifteen people are killed during four collisions in Laghman Province, near the end of the same highway.

=== February ===
- February 19 – A landslide in Nuristan Province buries the village of Nakre in the Tatin Valley and leaves at least 25 people dead.
- February 20 – March 13 – At least 60 people are killed and 23 others are injured due to flooding and adverse weather conditions involving snow and rain nationwide.

=== March ===
- March 17 – A bus traveling from Herat to Kabul collides with a motorcycle before slamming into an oil tanker along the Kandahar–Herat Highway in Grishk District, Helmand Province, killing 21 people and injuring 28.
- March 18 – Five women and three children are killed during two Pakistani airstrikes in Khost and Paktika provinces following accusations that attacks in Pakistan were masterminded in Afghanistan, which the Taliban deny. In response, the Taliban opens fire on Pakistani troops at the border.
- March 21 – A suicide bombing inside a bank in Kandahar kills 21 people and injures 50 others. The Islamic State claims responsibility for the attack.
- March 31 – Nine children are killed after a landmine they discovered explodes while playing with it in Giro District, Ghazni Province.

=== April ===
- April 12-14 – At least 33 people are killed and 27 others are injured in flash floods caused by heavy rain in 20 provinces nationwide including in Kabul.
- April 17 – The Taliban orders the suspension of the television channels Noor TV and Barya TV for allegedly failing to “consider national and Islamic values”.
- April 20 – One person is killed and three others are injured in a car bombing at a predominantly Hazara neighborhood in Kabul.
- April 29 – Six people are killed after a gunman opens fire inside a Shiite mosque in Guzara District, Herat Province.

=== May ===
- May 8 – A motorcycle bombing kills three Taliban security personnel in Faizabad, Badakhshan Province. The Islamic State claims responsibility for the attack.
- May 10 – Between 150 to 300 people are killed during flash floods in Baghlan Province.
- May 15 – A military Mi-17 helicopter crashes in Ghor Province, killing one person.
- May 17:
  - Six people, including three Spanish nationals, are killed and seven others are injured in a gun attack in Bamiyan. The Islamic State claims responsibility for the attack.
  - At least 84 people are killed during flash floods in Ghor and Faryab Provinces.
- May 21 – Turkish Airlines resumes flights to Afghanistan for the first time since the Taliban takeover in 2021.
- May 25 – At least 15 people are killed in flash floods in Badakhshan and Baghlan Provinces.

=== June ===
- June 1 – At least 20 people are killed after a boat sinks at a river crossing in Momand Dara District, Nangarhar Province.

=== July ===
- July 15 –
  - At least 40 people are killed following a storm in Nangarhar Province.
  - A bus traveling on the Kabul-Balkh highway overturns in Baghlan Province, killing 17 people and injuring 34 others.
- July 30 – The Taliban suspends relations with 14 Afghan overseas diplomatic missions and announces that they will no longer accept consular documents issued by these missions.

=== August ===
- August 5 – The Taliban allows foreigners inside the country on visas issued by the former government to stay, while those with visas but are outside Afghanistan would not be allowed to enter without documents from a Taliban-approved diplomatic mission.
- August 11 – At least one person is killed and eleven others are injured in a IED explosion in Dasht-e-Barchi, Kabul, that is claimed by the Islamic State.
- August 13 – Three Afghan civilians are killed during clashes between the Taliban and Pakistani forces at the Torkham border crossing.
- August 17 – Uzbekistani Prime Minister Abdulla Aripov becomes the highest ranking foreign official to visit Afghanistan since the return of the Taliban in 2021.
- August 20 –
  - The Taliban bans United Nations special rapporteur on human rights to Afghanistan Richard Bennett from entering the country for spreading "propaganda".
  - The Taliban's virtue ministry dismisses 281 members of the security force for failing to grow a beard and announces that they also destroyed 21,328 musical instruments in the past year and prevented thousands of computer operators from selling "immoral and unethical" films in markets.
- August 21 – The Taliban issues new laws on vice and virtue severely curtailing women's rights.
- August 29 – The Taliban bans mixed martial arts, saying it is too violent and has a risk of death and that it is incompatible with Islamic law.

=== September ===
- September 2 – Six people are killed and 13 others are injured in a suicide bombing in the Qala Bakhtiar neighbourhood of Kabul. The Islamic State takes responsibility the following day.
- September 12 – Fifteen Hazaras are killed and six others are injured in a gun attack in Daykundi Province. The Islamic State takes responsibility.
- September 16 – The United Nations announces the suspension of the country's polio vaccination program by the Taliban.
- September 17 – The Taliban announces the reopening of the Afghan embassy in Muscat, Oman.
- September 22 – Iran summons the acting head of Afghanistan's embassy after saying that a visiting Afghan official disrespected the country's national anthem by not standing during a performance of the anthem, days after a similar incident occurred in Pakistan. The Afghan delegate apologizes, claiming that this was because the public performance of music is banned by the Taliban.
- September 27 – The Afghan embassy in London closes down following an "official request" by the United Kingdom's Foreign Commonwealth and Development Office, according to Ambassador Zalmai Rassoul. However, the FCO says that the decision to close the embassy was made by the "State of Afghanistan".

=== October ===
- October 23 – Eleven people are injured in an explosion at a market in the Pamir Cinema neighbourhood of Kabul.
- October 24 – Helmand Province imposes a ban on the broadcast, filming and taking of images of living things.

=== December ===
- December 5 – The Taliban closes down Arezo TV for broadcasting "vulgar" content and working with overseas media outlets.
- December 11 – Khalil Haqqani, the Minister of Refugee and Repatriation under the Taliban regime, is killed along with two others in a suicide bombing at the ministry headquarters in Kabul.
- December 18 – A total of 50 people are killed and 76 others are injured in two separate crashes along the Kabul–Kandahar Highway in Ghazni Province.
- December 23 – Saudi Arabia reopens its embassy in Kabul for the first time since the Taliban takeover in 2021.
- December 24 – At least 46 people are killed following Pakistani airstrikes on Paktika Province.
- December 28 – The Taliban says it had launched attacks on multiple targets in Pakistan in retaliation for the airstrikes in Paktika Province.

== Sports ==
- January – Afghan cricket team in India in 2023–24
- 25 December 2023 – 2 January 2024: Afghan cricket team in the United Arab Emirates in 2023–24

== Deaths ==
- January 4 – Nur Ahmed Nur, 87, politician, minister of the interior (1978).
- May 29 – Qayum Karzai, 77, politician, MP (2004–2008).
- June 4 – Ahmad Shah Khan, Crown Prince of Afghanistan, 89, royal, head of the House of Barakzai (since 2007).
