= Haqqani =

Haqqani or Haqani (lit. 'righteous' in Persian; from haqq, Arabic for truth) may refer to:

== Things ==
- Naqshbandi Haqqani Sufi Order, a Sunni Sufi order
  - Naqshbandi-Haqqani Golden Chain, the lineage of the order
- Haqqani Anjuman, an organisation in Bangladesh
- Haqqani network, an Afghan insurgent group operating in Afghanistan and Pakistan, allied with the Taliban
- Haghani Circle (also Haqqani), a Shi'i school of thought (philosophy)

== Fictional people ==
- Haissam Haqqani, fictional Taliban leader in Homeland
  - Jalal Haqqani, fictional character, son of the above
- Farid Haqqani, fictional terrorist in the 2019 Indian film War

== People ==
- Abdul Basit Haqqani, Pakistani diplomat
- Abdul Fatah Haqqani (?–2011), Afghan who was held in the Bagram Internment Facility
- Anas Haqqani, Afghan Taliban leader, commander and poet
- Ezatullah Haqqani (born c. 1963), Taliban civil leader
- Husain Haqqani (born 1956), Pakistani diplomat
- Ibrahim Haqqani, prominent member of the Zadran tribe in Afghanistan
- Irshad Ahmed Haqqani (1928–2010), journalist from Pakistan
- Jalaluddin Haqqani (1939–2018), founder of the Haqqani network
- Khalil Haqqani (1966–2024), senior member of the Haqqani network
- Nazim Al-Haqqani (1922–2014), Turkish Cypriot Sufi and leader of the Naqshbandi-Haqqani Order
- Sayeedur Rahman Haqani, senior member of the Taliban leadership
- Sirajuddin Haqqani (born c. 1970), senior member of the Haqqani network, son of Jalaluddin
- Abdul Aziz Haqqani, Afghan Taliban and Haqqani network member
- Amanullah Haqqani, (died. 2018), Pakistani religious and political figure

== See also ==
- Haq (disambiguation)
