= 2025 in Afghanistan =

- Decades: 2000s; 2010s; 2020s
- See also: Other events of 2025; List of years in Afghanistan

Events in the year 2025 in Afghanistan.

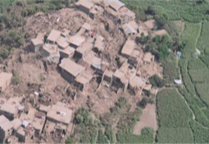
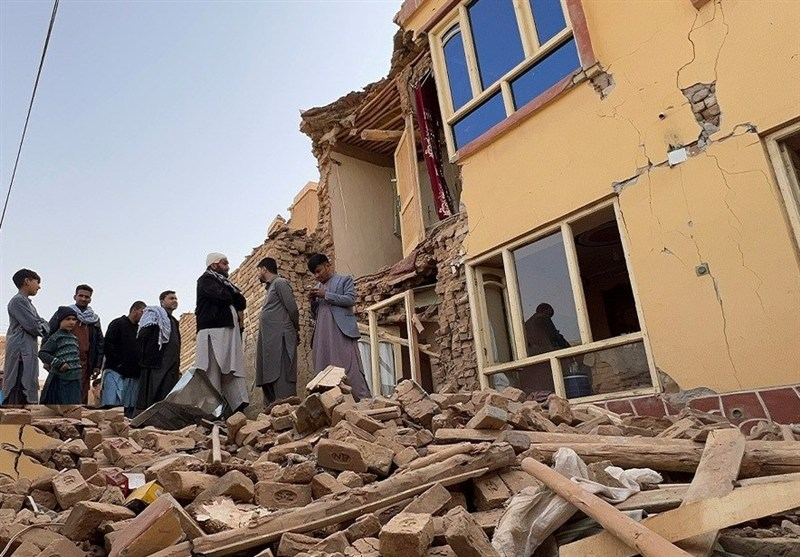
- From top, left to right: • 2025 Kunar earthquake • 2025 Afghanistan–Pakistan conflict • 2025 Balkh earthquake

== Incumbents ==
Photo	Post	Name	Dates
	Supreme Leader	Hibatullah Akhundzada	15 August 2021 – present
	Acting Prime Minister	Hasan Akhund	7 September 2021 – present
	Chief Justice	Abdul Hakim Haqqani	15 August 2021 – present
Haqqani / Yaqoob; Baradar	Deputy Leader	Sirajuddin Haqqani (first); Mullah Yaqoob (second); Abdul Ghani Baradar (third)	15 August 2021 – present
Baradar / Hanafi; Kabir	Acting Deputy Prime Minister	Abdul Ghani Baradar (first); Abdul Salam Hanafi (second); Abdul Kabir (third)	7 September 2021 – present

== Events ==
=== Ongoing ===
Afghan conflict; Islamic State–Taliban conflict; Republican insurgency in Afghanistan; 2025 hunger crisis in Afghanistan

=== January ===
- January 21 –
  - The Taliban announces the release of two American citizens in exchange for Taliban figure Muhammad Khan who was arrested in Nangarhar Province and imprisoned in the US.
  - A Chinese national is killed in an attack on his vehicle by a group calling itself the National Mobilization Front in Takhar Province.

=== February ===
- February 1 – A British couple based in Bamiyan is arrested by the Taliban in unspecified circumstances. They are subsequently released on 19 September after Qatari mediation.
- February 2 – A Taliban fighter opens fire on the United Nations compound in Kabul, injuring a guard before being found dead in undisclosed circumstances. The Taliban government attributes the incident to a "misunderstanding".
- February 4 – The Taliban order the suspension of operations of the women-run radio station Radio Begum for “unauthorized provision” of content and programming to an overseas TV channel.
- February 6 – Turkey withdraws its accreditation of Afghan diplomats representing the pre-2021 government.
- February 11 – Five people are killed in a suicide bombing near a bank in Kunduz Province.
- February 13 – One person is killed in a suicide bombing at the compound of the Ministry of Urban Development and Housing in Kabul.
- February 17 – The Taliban conducts a diplomatic visit to Japan for the first time since taking power in 2021.
- February 24 – The Taliban announce the arrest of a Chinese-American national and her translator for using a drone without authorization. She is subsequently released on 29 March.
- February 26 – At least 36 people are reported killed in heavy rain and snowstorms nationwide.

=== March ===
- 3 March – An Afghan soldier is killed during clashes with Pakistani forces at the Torkham border crossing.
- 20 March – The Taliban announce the release of American tourist George Glezmann, whom it had held since 2022, following negotiations mediated by Qatar.
- 23 March – The Taliban announce the lifting of bounties placed by the United States on three senior officials, namely Interior Minister Sirajuddin Haqqani, Abdul Aziz Haqqani, and Yahya Haqqani.

=== May ===
- 11 May – The Taliban announce a suspension on playing chess nationwide, citing concerns over its association with gambling.

=== June ===
- 4 June – US President Donald Trump issues a proclamation barring Afghan nationals from entering the United States.

=== July ===
- 3 July – Russia becomes the first country to recognize the Taliban as the legitimate government of Afghanistan since they retook power in 2021.
- 4 July – According to Pakistan's military, 30 fighters cross from Afghan territory into Pakistan before being killed in North Waziristan.
- 8 July – The International Criminal Court issues arrest warrants against the Taliban's supreme leader Hibatullah Akhundzada and Chief Justice Abdul Hakim Haqqani over the persecution of women in Afghanistan.
- 17 July – Afghanistan, Pakistan, and Uzbekistan sign a tripartite framework agreement in Kabul to conduct a feasibility study for the Trans-Afghan railway project.
- 18 July – Germany launches its second repatriation flight to Afghanistan since the Taliban takeover in 2021, deporting 81 Afghan nationals.

=== August ===
- 19 August – 2025 Herat road crash: A bus carrying Afghans returning from Iran collides with a fuel truck and a motorcycle before catching fire in Guzara District, Herat Province, killing 79 people and injuring two.
- 26 August – The Taliban issue a ban on lavish and "un-Islamic" wedding practices.
- 27 August – A bus overturns in Arghandi, Kabul, killing 25 people and injuring 27 others.
- 30 August – The Taliban issue a ban on romantic poetry.
- 31 August –
  - A magnitude 6.0 earthquake hits Kunar Province, killing at least 2,210 people.
  - At least five people are killed in floods in Nangarhar Province.

=== September ===
- 1 September – An overcrowded car overturns in Aqcha District, Jowzjan Province, killing eight people and injuring four others.
- 4 September –
  - A magnitude 5.6 earthquake hits Kunar Province, killing one person.
  - Around 130 people are taken ill during a charity meal in Zazai Maidan District, Khost Province.
- 8 September –
  - Russian ethnographer Svyatoslav Kaverin, who was arrested by the Taliban in Kunduz Province on 19 July on charges of smuggling jewelry, is released and repatriated.
  - Iranian border guards open fire on a group of 120 Afghan migrants attempting to enter the country at the Golshan border crossing, killing six people.
- 9 September – Seven members of a single family are killed in the detonation of explosives stockpiled inside a house in Bala Buluk District, Farah Province.
- 10 September –
  - A bus falls off a ravine in the Palfi Pass in Baghlan Province, killing nine people and injuring seven others.
  - A helicopter of the Afghan Air Force crashes in Tulak District, Ghor Province. All occupants survive.
- 14 September – Six people are killed in a traffic accident in Faryab Province.
- 16 September – The Taliban order a ban on fibre optic internet in Balkh Province, citing immorality concerns.
- 18 September – The Taliban order a ban on fibre optic internet in Baghlan, Badakhshan, Kunduz, Nangarhar, and Takhar Provinces.
- 23 September – A magnitude 4.9 earthquake hits Nangarhar Province, injuring 15 people.
- 28 September – The Taliban release American citizen Amir Amiri, who had been detained in unexplained circumstances since December 2024.
- 29 September –
  - The Taliban order a nationwide shutdown of fibre optic internet. Internet access is restored on 1 October.
  - Staff at the Afghan consulate-general in Bonn, Germany resign en masse in protest over the German government's decision to accredit Taliban representatives as diplomats.

=== October ===
- 2 October – Clashes break out between the Taliban and Pakistani forces along a section of the Durand Line in Nari District, Kunar Province.
- 9 October – 2025 Afghanistan–Pakistan conflict: The Taliban accuses Pakistan of responsibility for an explosion in the vicinity of Abdul Haq Square in Kabul.
- 10 October –
  - The Taliban accuse Pakistani forces of bombing a market in Paktika Province.
  - India upgrades its Technical Mission in Kabul to embassy status for the first time since the Taliban takeover in 2021.
  - The UAE-based airliner Etihad begins direct flights to Kabul.
- 12 October – 2025 Afghanistan–Pakistan conflict: The Taliban carry out cross-border attacks against Pakistan, resulting in at least 23 deaths among Pakistani forces.
- 15 October – 2025 Afghanistan–Pakistan conflict: The Pakistani military carries out airstrikes on Kabul.
- 19 October – 2025 Afghanistan–Pakistan conflict: Afghanistan and Pakistan agree to an immediate truce after negotiations mediated by Qatar and Turkey.

=== November ===
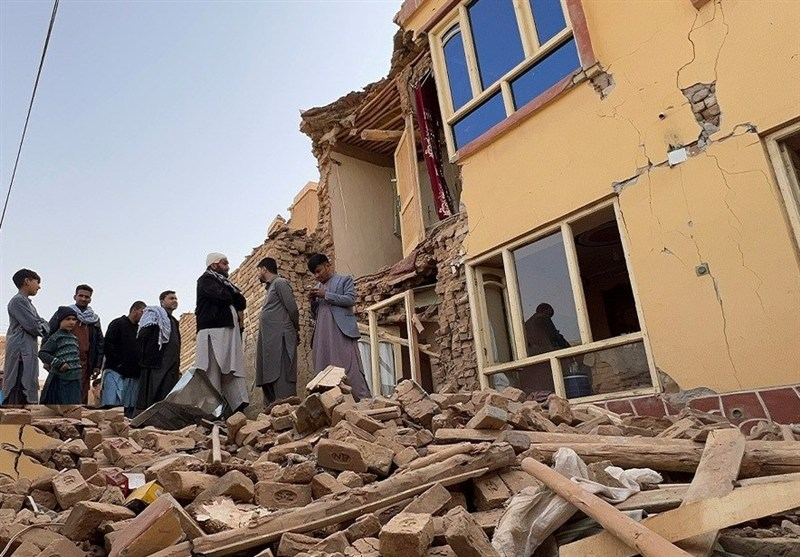
Damage to homes in Balkh Province, Afghanistan.

- 3 November – A magnitude 6.3 earthquake hits Samangan Province, killing at least 31 people.
- 5 November – One person is injured in an explosion at a mosque in Ghani Khel district, Nangarhar Province.
- 6 November – Five people are killed in clashes between the Taliban and Pakistani forces at the Spin Boldak border crossing in Kandahar Province.
- 7 November – A would-be suicide bomber dies in a premature detonation near a buzkashi field in Kunduz.
- 23 November – A bus collides with a minivan in Zawol District, Herat Province, killing 10 people and injuring 12 others.
- 25 November – At least 10 people are killed in a Pakistani airstrike in Gurbuz District, Khost Province.
- 28 November – The United States suspends the issuance of visas to Afghan passport-holders in response to the 2025 Washington, D.C., National Guard shooting believed to have been carried out by an Afghan national.

=== December ===
- 2 December – The Taliban publicly execute a man convicted of killing 13 members of a single family in Khost.
- 5 December – At least five people are killed in clashes between Afghan and Pakistani forces in Spin Boldak District, Kandahar Province.
- 6 December – Australia imposes a weapons embargo on Afghanistan and sanctions on four senior Taliban officials (Minister for the Propagation of Virtue and the Prevention of Vice Sheikh Mohammad Khalid, Minister of Higher Education Neda Mohammad, Minister of Justice Abdul-Hakim Sharei, and Chief Justice Abdul Hakim Haqqani), citing their role in human rights violations against women.
- 16 December – The Ariana Cinema in Kabul, which opened in 1963, is demolished.

== Holidays ==
- 14 February – Liberation Day
- 1 March – Ramadan
- 30 March – 1 April – Eid al-Fitr
- 28 April – Victory Day
- 1 May – Labour Day
- 5 June – Arafat Day
- 6–8 June – Eid al-Adha
- 5–6 July – Ashura
- 15 August – Anniversary of return to the power
- 19 August – Afghan Independence Day
- 31 August – American Withdrawal Day
- 4 September – Milad un-Nabi

== Deaths ==
- 23 January – Ali Reza Asahi, 50, bodybuilder.
- 2 November – Hedayat Amin Arsala, 84, vice president (2001–2002), minister of foreign affairs (1993–1994) and finance (2001–2002).
- 9 November – Mohammed Rafie, 79, vice president (1988-1992), Minister of Defence (1979–1982, 1986-1988) and public works (1978).
- 29 December – Abu Walid al-Masri, 80, Egyptian-born journalist (Al Jazeera) and Islamist militant (Afghan Arabs).
