= 2023 in Afghanistan =

- Decades: 2000s; 2010s; 2020s
- See also: Other events of 2023; List of years in Afghanistan

Events in the year 2023 in Afghanistan.

According to the United Nations Development Programme, by 2022, 97% of Afghans could fall under the poverty threshold, which would plunge the country into a major humanitarian crisis and famine approaching the capital Kabul and other major towns and cities in Afghanistan, where millions of Afghan people starved to death, hundreds of thousands of more including men, women, children and babies are facing extreme acute hunger where heading into 2023.

In January 2023, the Taliban officials reported deaths of at least 157 people due to Afghanistan’s harsh winter. The number had doubled in less than a week. The impact was worsened after the Taliban banned female NGO workers.

== Incumbents ==
Photo	Post	Name	Dates
	Supreme Leader	Hibatullah Akhundzada	15 August 2021 – present
	Acting Prime Minister	Hasan Akhund	7 September 2021 – present
	Chief Justice	Abdul Hakim Haqqani	15 August 2021 – present
Haqqani / Yaqoob; Baradar	Deputy Leader	Sirajuddin Haqqani (first); Mullah Yaqoob (second); Abdul Ghani Baradar (third)	15 August 2021 – present
Baradar / Hanafi; Kabir	Acting Deputy Prime Minister	Abdul Ghani Baradar (first); Abdul Salam Hanafi (second); Abdul Kabir (third)	7 September 2021 – present

== Events ==
=== Ongoing ===
- Afghan conflict
  - Islamic State–Taliban conflict
  - Republican insurgency in Afghanistan
- COVID-19 pandemic in Afghanistan

=== January ===
- 1 January:
  - 2023 Kabul airport bombing: According to the interior minister of the Taliban government, a bombing took place at the military airport of Kabul, causing several casualties.
  - A 4.7 magnitude earthquake is recorded in Jorm, Badakhshan Province.
  - United Nations official Markus Potzel meets Taliban deputy prime minister, Maulvi Abdul Salam Hanafi, to discuss a ban preventing women from working in non-governmental organizations.
- 10 January - 2023 Afghanistan blizzard: A cold wave begins, causing 166 deaths, mostly shepherds and other people living in rural areas.
- 11 January - An Islamic State – Khorasan Province suicide bomber kills at least 20 people in Kabul.

=== February ===
- 28 February - The Taliban announce that the leader of operations and intelligence of Islamic State – Khorasan Province was killed during a raid in Kabul.

=== March ===
- 9 March - Three people, including Mohammad Dawood Muzamil, the Taliban-appointed governor of Balkh Province, are killed by an explosion at his office.
- 21 March - 2023 Badakhshan earthquake: An earthquake strikes Badakhshan Province, killing at least 30 people and injuring over 300.
- 23 March - Three people are killed by heavy snow and rainfall in Afghanistan.
- 27 March - Six people are killed and several others are injured when a suicide bomber detonates himself near the Ministry of Foreign Affairs headquarters in Kabul.

=== April ===
- 4 April - Six Islamic State members are killed during a raid by the Taliban in Balkh Province.

=== May ===
- 21 May - Two people are killed when an MD-530 helicopter crashes into power lines in Samangan Province.

=== June ===
- 4 June - Seventy-seven primary school girls are hospitalised after a poison attack on two schools in Sancharak, Sar-e Pol.
- 6 June - The deputy governor of Afghanistan's Badakhshan Province and his driver are killed and six civilians injured when a suicide car bomber rams their vehicle in Fayzabad.
- 8 June - 2023 Fayzabad mosque bombing: At least 11 people are killed and 30 others are injured by a car bomb outside a mosque in Fayzabad, during a prayer service for the deputy governor of Badakhshan Province who was killed two days ago. The Islamic State claimed responsibility.
- 11 June - Three people are killed and three others are injured after border clashes near the North Waziristan District, Khyber Pakhtunkhwa, Pakistan, on the Afghanistan–Pakistan border.

=== July ===
- 17 July - Three children are killed and two others are injured when a mortar warhead explodes in Dara-i Sufi Payin District, Samangan Province.
- 23 July - Flash floods in Kabul, the Ghazni and Maidan Wardak provinces, have killed at least 31 people, injured 74 others, and left 41 missing in the past three days. Around 250 livestock are also killed.
- 26 July - The Taliban orders beauty salons in Afghanistan to close despite United Nations concern and rare public protests.

=== August ===
- 14 August - At least three people are killed and seven others are injured in an explosion at a hotel in Khost.

=== October ===
- 7 October - 2023 Herat earthquakes: At least 2,445 people are killed and 9,240 others are injured when two magnitude 6.3 earthquakes strike Herat Province.
- 11 October - A magnitude 6.3 aftershock strikes near Herat, killing at least one person and injuring 65 others. It comes days after two earthquakes of the same magnitude struck the same area and killed thousands.
- 15 October -
  - Herat Province is struck by another magnitude 6.3 earthquake, killing a person and injuring over 100 others, several days after a series of powerful earthquakes killed over 1,000 people in the province.
  - The Taliban government confirms that it will attend the Belt and Road Initiative forum in Beijing, China, next week, as the countries form closer economic ties, including the potential construction of a large copper mine in Logar Province, eastern Afghanistan.

=== November ===
- 8 November - November 2023 Kabul bombing.

=== December ===
- 29 December — Kazakh Foreign Ministry spokesman Aybek Smadiyarov stated in an interview with Kazinform that the Taliban is not designated as a terrorist organization by the UN Security Council.
- 31 December — Taliban defense minister Mullah Yaqoob says that security forces have killed or arrested several militants from Tajikistan and Pakistan who are accused of multiple attacks in Afghanistan.

== Sports ==
- June – Afghan cricket team in Bangladesh 2023
- September-October – Afghanistan at the 2022 Asian Games
