= 2026 in Afghanistan =

- Decades: 2000s; 2010s; 2020s
- See also: Other events of 2026; List of years in Afghanistan

Events in the year 2026 in Afghanistan.

== Incumbents ==
Photo	Post	Name	Dates
	Supreme Leader	Hibatullah Akhundzada	15 August 2021 – present
	Prime Minister	Hasan Akhund	7 September 2021 – present
	Chief Justice	Abdul Hakim Haqqani	15 August 2021 – present
Haqqani / Yaqoob; Baradar	Deputy Leader	Sirajuddin Haqqani (first); Mullah Yaqoob (second); Abdul Ghani Baradar (third)	15 August 2021 – present
Baradar / Hanafi	Deputy Prime Minister	Abdul Ghani Baradar (first); Abdul Salam Hanafi (second)	7 September 2021 – present

== Events ==
=== Ongoing ===
- Afghan conflict
  - Islamic State–Taliban conflict
  - Republican insurgency in Afghanistan
- 2025–2026 hunger crisis in Afghanistan

=== January ===
- 1 January –
  - At least 17 people are reported killed in nationwide flash-floods.
  - An unidentified drone crashes on a hillside in Maidan Shar.
- 6 January – Four people are killed in clashes between residents and employees of a gold mining company in Chah Ab District, Takhar Province.
- 19 January – Seven people are killed in a bomb attack at a restaurant in Shahr-e Naw, Kabul. Islamic State claims responsibility.
- 21 January –
  - Six people are killed in rainstorms in Kandahar.
  - Three people are killed in a landslide in Quraish, Nuristan.
- 24 January – At least 61 people are reported killed in three days of nationwide snowstorms.
- 29 January – Seven people are killed in a house collapse in Jalalabad.

=== February ===
- 7 February – A minibus falls into a valley in Badakhshan province, killing 15 people.
- 12 February – A magnitude 4.5 earthquake hits Balkh province, injuring three people.
- 17 February – Three Pakistani soldiers captured by Afghanistan during the 2025 Afghanistan–Pakistan conflict are released following mediation by Saudi Arabia.
- 22 February – Pakistan carries out airstrikes on suspected militant camps in Nangarhar and Paktika provinces, killing 18 people.
- 26 February – The Afghan Taliban carry out attacks on Pakistani army posts. The Taliban says about 40 Pakistani soldiers were killed, while Pakistani security sources claim 22 Taliban personnel dead and several quadcopters shot down.
- 27 February – Pakistan declares "open war" against the Afghan Taliban.

=== March ===
- 1 March – Anti-aircraft fire is reported over Kabul, as Pakistani warplanes launch strikes against Taliban targets.
- 2 March – The Taliban says the Afghan military has successfully repelled Pakistani warplanes with surface-to-air missiles that were attacking Bagram Airfield as explosions are reported in several cities, including Kabul.
- 3 March – Pakistan says 67 Afghans and one Pakistani soldier had been killed in clashes along their border.
- 4 March – The United Kingdom suspends the issuance of work and student visas to Afghan nationals as part of efforts to reduce asylum requests.
- 6 March – The United Nations High Commissioner for Refugees reports at least 100,000 civilians have been displaced from their homes due to the fighting between Afghanistan and Pakistan, while Afghan forces say they have destroyed 14 more Pakistani military outposts along the border and downed a drone.
- 9 March – The United States designates Afghanistan as a sponsor of wrongful detention.
- 12 March – Four people are killed by Pakistani shelling in Sadqo, Khost Province.
- 13 March – Six people are killed and several others injured in a Pakistani airstrike against a residential area in Kabul. A fuel depot in Kandahar is also bombed.
- 16 March –
  - Two people are killed by Pakistani shelling in Khost Province.
  - At least 100 people are killed in a suspected Pakistani airstrike on a drug rehabilitation clinic in Kabul.
- 18 March – 2026 Afghanistan–Pakistan conflict: Afghanistan and Pakistan declare a ceasefire lasting until 23 March.
- 26 March – Two people are killed, including a child, and at least 90 families are affected in flooding in Kandahar.

=== April ===
- 3 April – A magnitude 5.8 earthquake hits the Hindu Kush, killing eight people in a house collapse in Kabul.
- 6 April –
  - The Taliban says that it has captured a border post during clashes in Khost.
  - One child is killed and three others are injured after a piece of unexploded ordnance detonates in Khost Province.
- 10 April – Eleven people are killed in a gun attack on a recreational area in Injil District, Herat Province.
- 27 April – Seven people are killed in suspected Pakistani attacks on Asadabad, Kunar Province.

=== May ===
- 3 May – On World Press Freedom Day, journalists launch the Kabul Times News media outlet in exile in France amidst media restrictions in Afghanistan.
- 4 May – Three people are killed in suspected Pakistani attacks in Kunar Province.
- 13 May – The Taliban announce the detention of two journalists from TOLONews on unspecified charges.
- 24 May – Torrential rain and heavy floods kill 11 and injure 15 others in the provinces of Panjshir, Paktia, Baghlan, and Takhar
- 27 May — Russia signs a military partnership agreement with the Taliban.
- 30 May – A truck carrying returning refugees from Pakistan overturns in Laghman Province, killing 22 people and injuring 36 others.

=== June ===
- 9 June – A protest takes place in Herat against the detention of women who violate strict dress codes mandated by the Ministry for the Propagation of Virtue and the Prevention of Vice. Taliban police react by firing live rounds into the protest, reportedly killing at least two demonstrators.
- 28 June – Pakistan launches airstrikes in Kunar, Paktia, and Paktika in retaliation for an attack in Karachi on 27 June claimed by Jamaat-ul-Ahrar.

=== July ===
- 20 July – Floods kill at least 20 people in Nuristan Province.

=== August ===
- 19 August – Senior National Resistance Front commander Hasib Quwayi Markaz is killed in an ambush by the Taliban in Salang District, Parwan province.
- 25 August – A magnitude 4.9 earthquake hits Nangarhar Province, injuring 15 people.

=== September ===
- 21 September – Pakistan launches air strikes against Afghanistan in retaliation for the 2026 Kohat attack, killing a family of three and injuring four others.
- 24 September – Pakistan finds eight drones launched from Afghanistan and launches air strikes, killing four people.

=== October ===
- 1 October – Pakistan launches air strikes on what is described as "terrorist camps" in Afghanistan.
- 4 October – The Taliban opens a 121 km (75 mi) gravel transit road through the Wakhan Corridor in Badakhshan Province to the Chinese border at the Wakhjir Pass, though China keeps the border closed to commercial traffic due to security concerns in Xinjiang.
- 5 October – Citing the group's treatment of women, the ICC unseals arrest warrants for Taliban leaders Hibatullah Akhundzada, Abdul Hakim Haqqani, Habibullah Agha, and Neda Mohammad Nadeem.
- 17 October – Pakistan and Afghan Taliban exchange fire following an attempt by TTP militants to infiltrate into Pakistan.
- 28 October – The Government of National Stability in eastern Libya bans the entry of nationals from Iran and Afghanistan.

=== November ===
- 13 November – The International Criminal Court closes its investigations into suspected war crimes committed by US troops in Afghanistan, following institutional sanctions imposed by the US on the court.

== Holidays ==
- 15 February – Liberation Day
- 18 February – Ramadan
- 20 March – 22 March – Eid al-Fitr
- 28 April – Victory Day
- 1 May – Labour Day
- 26 May – Arafat Day
- 27–28 May – Eid al-Adha
- 15 August – Anniversary of return to the power
- 19 August – Afghan Independence Day
- 31 August – American Withdrawal Day
- 4 September – Milad un-Nabi

== Deaths ==
- 22 January – Abdul Salam Azimi, 90, chief justice (2006–2014).
- 13 March – Sultan Ali Keshtmand, 90, Chairman of the Council of Ministers (1981–1988, 1989–1990).
- 4 June – Muhammad al-Fayadh, 95, marja.
- 21 June – Abdul Ahad Momand, 66–67, astronaut (Mir EP-3).
- 7 July – Shapoor Zadran, 38, cricketer (Badureliya, Khulna Royal Bengals, national team).
- 19 August – Hasib Quwayi Markaz, 34, military commander.
