= Haq =

HAQ or Haq may refer to:

== Places ==
- Haq, Iran, a village in West Azerbaijan Province, Iran
- Haq Rural District, in West Azerbaijan Province, Iran

== Other uses ==
- Haque (film), a 1991 Indian film
- Haq (2010 film), a Malaysian film
- Haq (2025 film), an Indian Hindi-language courtroom drama film
- Haq Movement, a political organization in Bahrain
- Haq TV, a Pakistani television station
- 4-Hydroxy-2-alkylquinoline, a signaling molecule
- Al-Haq, a Palestinian human rights organization
- Ha language (ISO 639-2 code: haq), of Tanzania
- Hanimaadhoo International Airport, in the Maldives
- Imtiaz Haq, a fictional character in the 2023 Indian film Tiger 3

== See also ==
- Haqq (حقّ), the Arabic word for truth
  - Haqiqa, "truth" in Sufism
- Haqq (surname), for the surname Haq
- Haqqani (disambiguation)
- H.A.Q.Q., a 2019 music album by Liturgy
- Hack (disambiguation)
- Haque (disambiguation)
