= Consequences and legacy of the Soviet–Afghan War =

The Soviet–Afghan War had numerous national and international consequences, and a continuing legacy.

== Aftermath ==
=== Fall of the Soviet Union ===
According to scholars Rafael Reuveny and Aseem Prakash, the war contributed to the fall of the Soviet Union by undermining the image of the Red Army as invincible, undermining Soviet legitimacy, and by creating new forms of political participation. On the other hand, the costs for the Soviet Union were not overwhelmingly large compared to other commitments. The CIA estimated in 1987 that the costs amounted to about 2.5 percent of the Soviet military spending per year. According to historian Sergey Radchenko there is no evidence that the Afghanistan war bankrupted the USSR. The Soviet Union spent about $7.5 billion between 1984 and 1987 but this number was negligible compared to the annual military budget of roughly $128 billion. The decision to withdraw was made based on a number of political factors. The studies about the dissolution of the Soviet Union by historians Stephen Kotkin and Vladislav Zubok identify mainly internal reasons for the collapse and mention the Afghanistan war only in passing.

The war created a cleavage between the party and the military in the Soviet Union, where the efficacy of using the Soviet military to maintain the USSR's overseas interests was now put in doubt. In the non-Russian republics, those interested in independence were emboldened by the army's defeat. Some Russian leaders began to doubt the ability to put down anti-Soviet resistance militarily (as it had in Czechoslovakia in 1968, Hungary in 1956, and East Germany in 1953). As the war was viewed as "a Soviet war fought by non Soviets against Afghans", outside of the Soviet Union it undermined the legitimacy of the Soviet Union as a trans-national political union. The war created new forms of political participation, in the form of new civil organizations of war veterans (Afgantsy), which weakened the political hegemony of the communist party. It also started the transformation of the press and media, which continued under glasnost.

=== Civil war ===
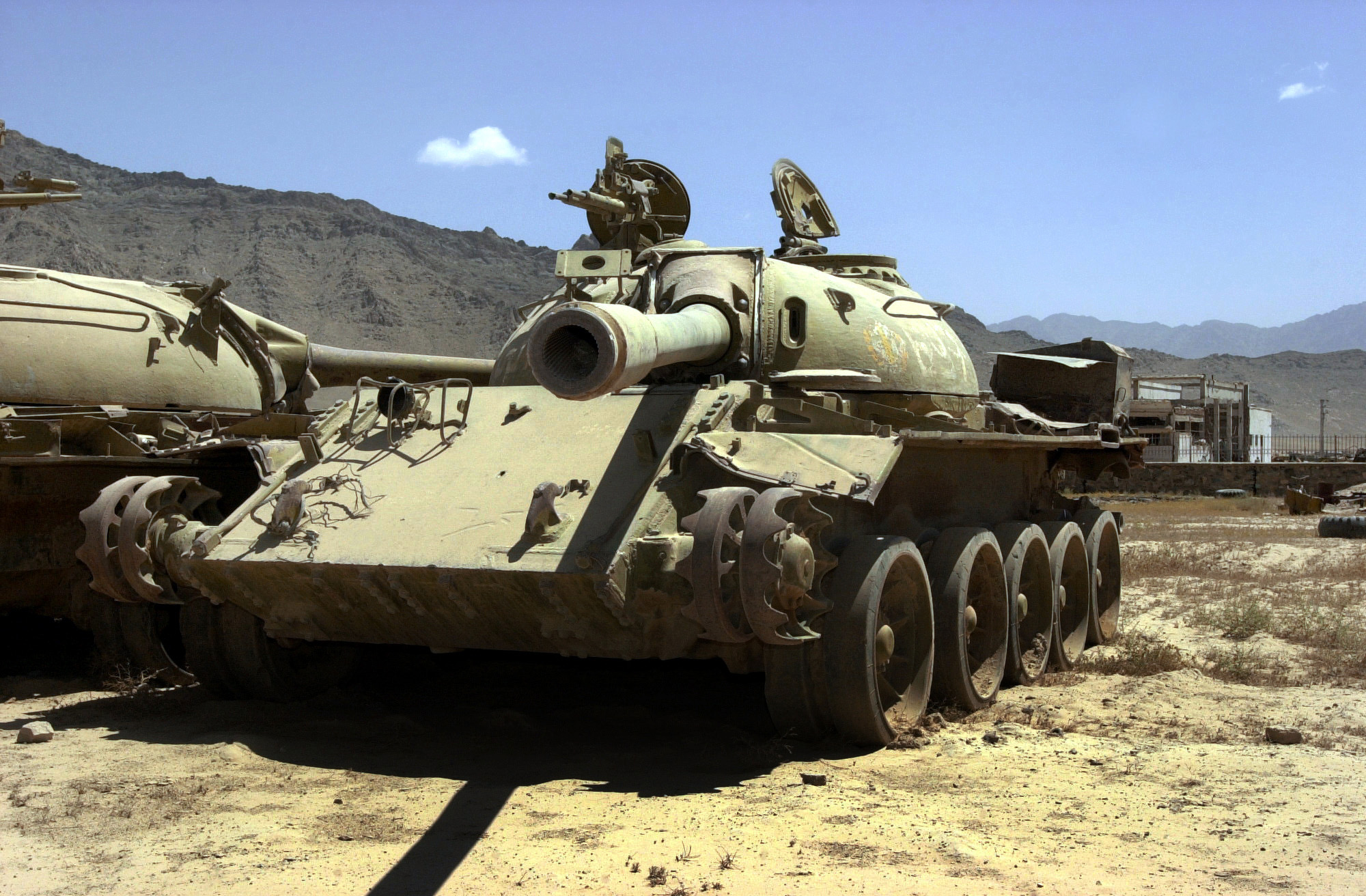
Two Soviet T-55 tanks formerly belonging to the Afghan Army lie rusting in a field near Bagram Airfield, in 2002

The war did not end with the withdrawal of the Soviet Army. The Soviet Union left Afghanistan deep in winter, with intimations of panic among Kabul officials. The Afghan mujahideen were poised to attack provincial towns and cities and eventually Kabul, if necessary. General Secretary Mohammed Najibullah's government, though failing to win popular support, territory, or international recognition, was able to remain in power until 1992. Ironically, until demoralized by the defections of its senior officers, the Afghan Army had achieved a level of performance it had never reached under direct Soviet tutelage. Kabul had achieved a stalemate that exposed the Mujahideen's weaknesses, political and military. But for nearly three years, while Najibullah's government successfully defended itself against Mujahideen attacks, factions within the government had also developed connections with its opponents.

Soviet leader Mikhail Gorbachev in 1989 proposed a peace plan in cooperation with the leader of Afghanistan, Mohammad Najibullah, for the joint cutoff of Soviet and American aid to the government and guerrillas respectively, to result in a ceasefire and peace negotiations. Najibullah sought American cooperation in achieving a political solution. However the newly elected administration of George H. W. Bush rejected the plan, expecting to win the war through battle. Almost immediately after the Soviet withdrawal, the Mujahideen attacked the eastern city of Jalalabad in a plan instigated by Hamid Gul of Pakistan's Inter-Service Intelligence (ISI). Both the Americans and Pakistanis expected Jalalabad to rapidly fall to the guerrillas and lead to a final victorious attack in Kabul. The Afghan Army proved their capability without Soviet troops as they managed to restrain the Mujahideen attack, resulting in a major defeat for the Mujahideen.

The victory at Jalalabad gave Najibullah's government confidence that it could achieve a political solution, specifically one involving former communists and moderates from the opposition. Along with the Afghan and Soviet governments, China also publicly said that it supported the creation of a "broad-based" government, and Iran also supporting a negotiated peaceful solution – both China and Iran being guerrilla-backing countries. But the United States and Pakistan remained committed to a military solution. In addition, the Afghan government could claim that Jalalabad's bombardment, in which thousands of civilians lost their lives and much of the city damaged, was masterminded by the United States and Pakistan, using American weaponry.

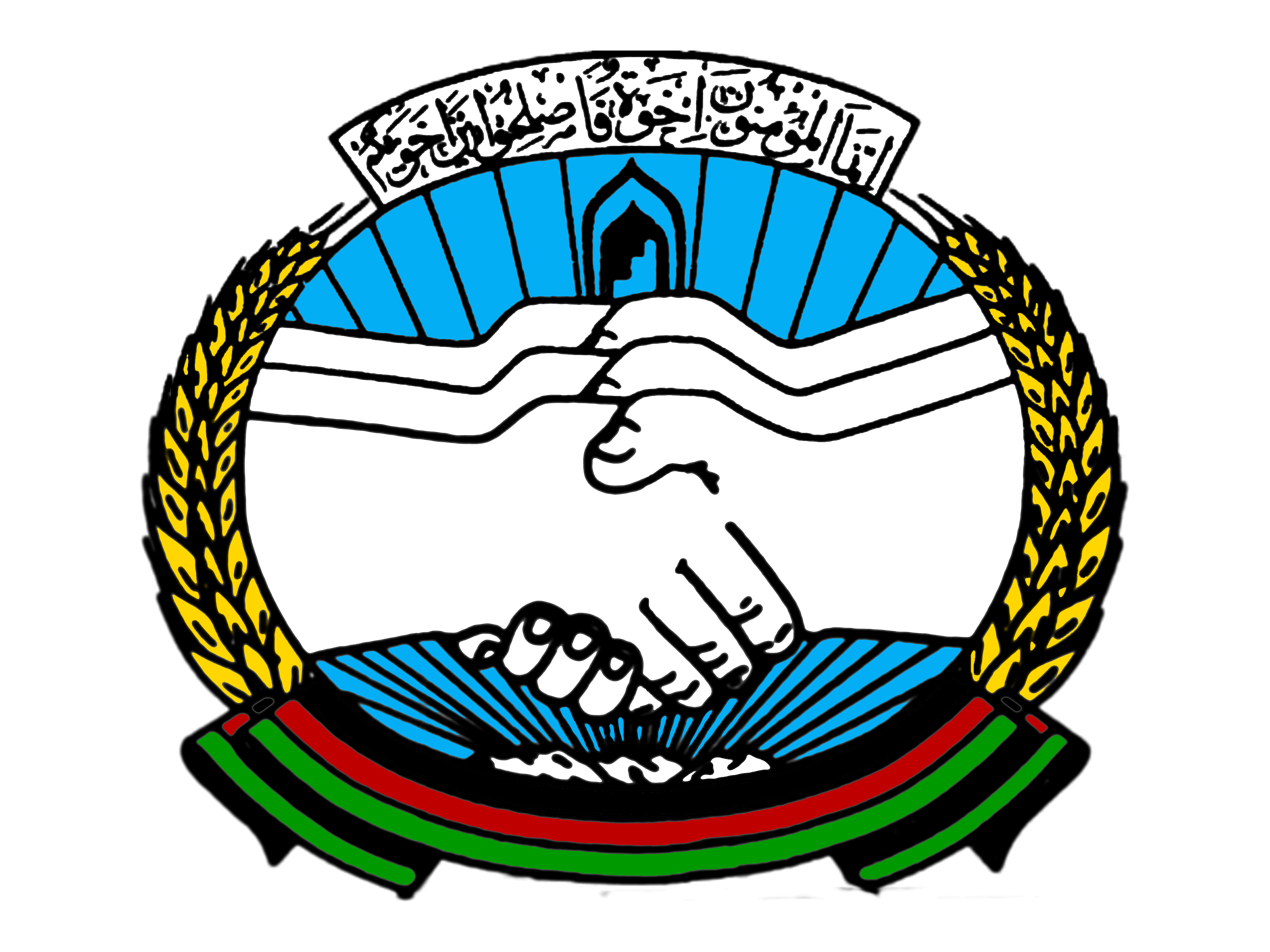
In 1990, Najibullah formed the "Watan Party" which consisted mostly of PDPA Members and members of Daoud Khan's National Revolutionary Party of Afghanistan

In December 1990, the United States and the Soviet Union came close to an agreement to end arms supplies to the sides in the civil war, but a date could not be agreed. Two years after the Soviet withdrawal, the guerrillas only gained one provincial capital, Tarinkot, and its surrender was arranged by local tribal leaders. However, in March 1991, the guerrillas managed to win over a city for the first time: Khost, which was nicknamed "Little Russia" due to the city's high support of local communist officials. However the guerrillas were unable to fully defeat the Afghan Army as expected by the United States and Pakistan, and neither could the Najibullah government win on the battlefield. This situation ended following the 1991 August Coup in the Soviet Union – according to Russian publicist Andrey Karaulov, the main trigger for Najibullah losing power was Russia's refusal to sell oil products to Afghanistan in 1992 for political reasons (the new Boris Yeltsin government did not want to support the former communists), which effectively triggered an embargo. In April, Najibullah and his communist government fell to the Mujahideen, who replaced Najibullah with a new governing council for the country.

Civil war continued when the former Mujahideen guerrillas, which were never under a united command during the period from 1979 to 1992, failed to create a functioning unity government in 1992. The civil war continued and about 400,000 Afghan civilians had lost their lives in the 1990s, eventually leading to Taliban rule.

Grain production declined an average of 3.5% per year between 1978 and 1990 due to sustained fighting, instability in rural areas, prolonged drought, and deteriorated infrastructure. Restoration of gas production has been hampered by internal strife and the disruption of traditional trading relationships following the dissolution of the Soviet Union.

=== Rise of Jihadist movements ===
"The Soviet strategy of "rubblization" returned the country to the Dark Ages, paving the way for a radicalization of the survivors (many of whom joined the now infamous Taliban movement) that would be realized in the decade after the Soviet departure in 1988."
Samuel Totten & Paul Bartrop

Following the Soviet withdrawal, some of the foreign volunteers (including Osama bin Laden's al-Qaeda) and young Afghan refugees, went on to continue violent jihad in Afghanistan, Pakistan and abroad. Some of the thousands of Afghan Arabs who left Afghanistan went on to become "capable leaders, religious ideologues and military commanders," who played "vital roles" as insurgents or terrorists in places such as Algeria, Egypt, Bosnia and Chechnya. Tens of thousands of Afghan refugee children in Pakistan were educated in madrassas "in a spirit of conservatism and religious rigor", and went on to fill the ranks and leadership of the Taliban in Afghanistan and Sipah-e-Sahaba in Pakistan. The groups embodied new varieties of Political Islam – "Salafi jihadism" among the foreign volunteers, and a "hybrid" Deobandi jihadism among the madrassa-educated.

Afghanistan's General Secretary Najibullah, before his ouster by the Mujahideen in 1992, told a visiting US academic that "Afghanistan in extremist hands would be a center of instability." It has been claimed that the chaos could have been avoided had the Bush administration been willing to support the Najibullah and Soviet proposals of a coalition government with the guerrillas, instead of a total military solution. Najibullah also told the International Herald Tribune that "if fundamentalism comes to Afghanistan, war will continue for many years. Afghanistan will be turned into a center of terrorism."

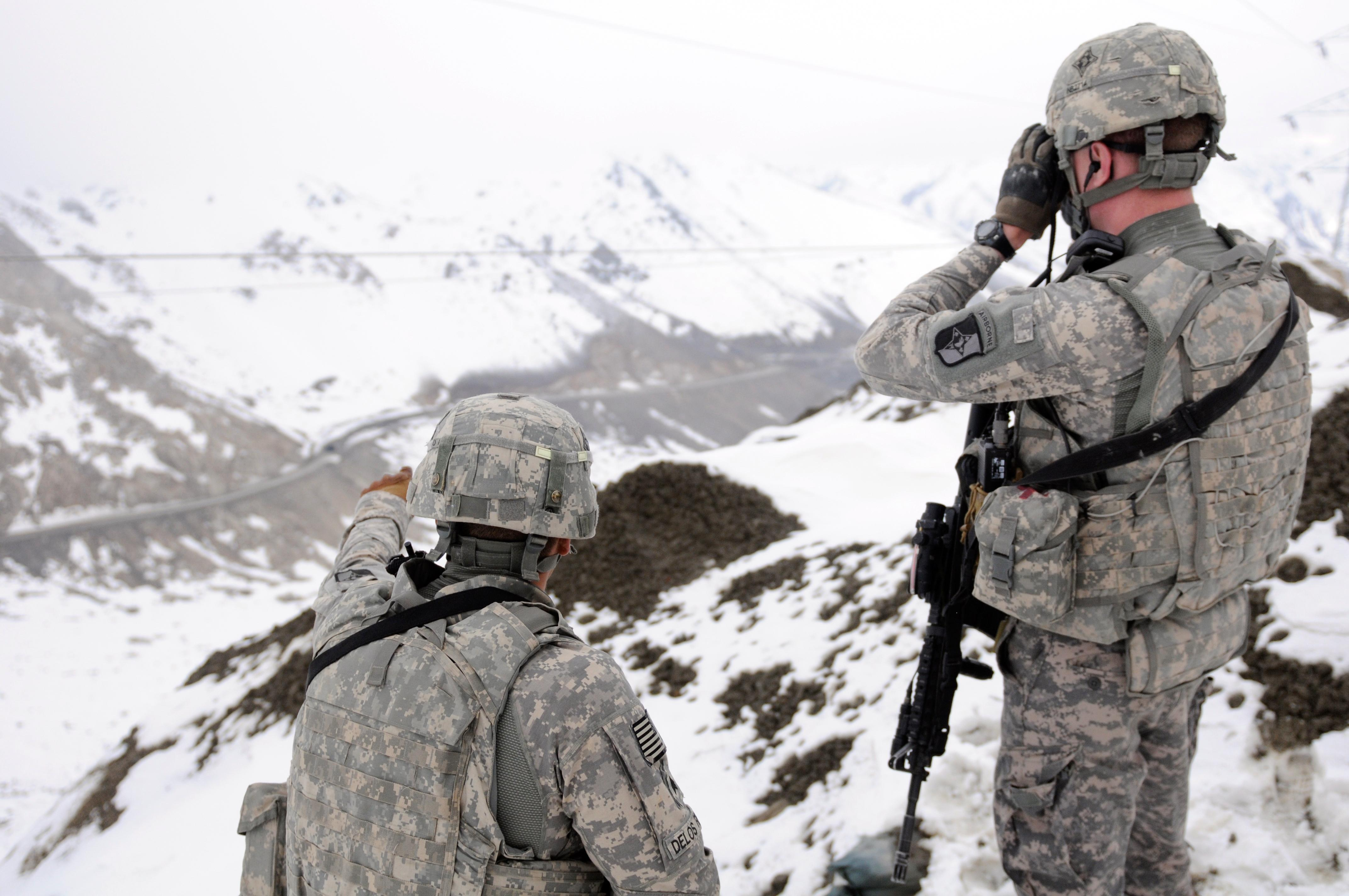
U.S. troops in 2011 surveying the Salang Pass during the War in Afghanistan, the route used by Soviet forces during the invasion 32 years before

As many as 35,000 non-Afghan Muslim fighters went to Afghanistan between 1982 and 1992. Thousands more came and did not fight but attended schools with "former and future fighters". These "Afghan-Arabs" had a marginal impact on the jihad against the Soviets, but a much greater effect after the Soviets left and in other countries. (After the Soviets left, training continued and "tens of thousands" from "some 40 nations" came to prepare for armed insurrections "to bring the struggle back home". )

The man instrumental not only in generating international support but also in inspiring these volunteers to travel to Afghanistan for the jihad was a Palestinian Muslim Brotherhood cleric, Abdullah Azzam. Touring the Muslim world and the United States, he inspired young Muslims with stories of miraculous deeds, such as Mujahideen who defeated vast columns of Soviet troops virtually single-handedly, angels riding into battle on horseback, and falling bombs intercepted by birds.

When back in the volunteer camps and training centers that he helped set up around Peshawar, Pakistan, Azzam exercised a "strong influence". He preached the importance of jihad: "those who believe that Islam can flourish [and] be victorious without Jihad, fighting, and blood are deluded and have no understanding of the nature of this religion"; of not compromising: "Jihad and the rifle alone: no negotiations, no conferences and no dialogues"; and that Afghanistan was only the beginning: jihad would "remain an individual obligation" for Muslims until all other formerly-Muslim lands—"Palestine, Bukhara, Lebanon, Chad, Eritrea, Somalia, the Philippines, Burma, South Yemen, Tashkent, Andalusia"—were reconquered.

The volunteers also influenced each other. Many "unexpected" religious-political ideas resulted from the "cross-pollination" during the "great gathering" of Islamists from dozens of countries in the camps and training centers. One in particular was a "variant of Islamist ideology based on armed struggle and extreme religious vigour", known as Salafi jihadism.

When the Soviet Union fell shortly after their withdrawal from Afghanistan, the volunteers were "exultant", believing that—in the words of Osama bin Laden—the credit for "the dissolution of the Soviet Union ... goes to God and the mujahideen in Afghanistan ... the US had no mentionable role," (Soviet economic troubles and United States aid to Mujahideen notwithstanding). They eagerly sought to duplicate their jihad in other countries.

Three such countries were Bosnia, Algeria and Egypt. In Bosnia, the Salafi jihadist Afghan Arabs fought against Bosnian Serb and Croat militias but failed to establish a Salafi state. In Algeria and Egypt, thousand of volunteers returned and fought but were even less successful. In Algeria, Salafi jihadist helped lead and fight for the GIA, deliberately killing thousands of civilians. In Egypt, the Al-Gama'a al-Islamiyya killed more than a thousand people between 1990 and 1997 but also failed to overthrow the government.

==== Spread of Islamic militancy in Pakistan ====
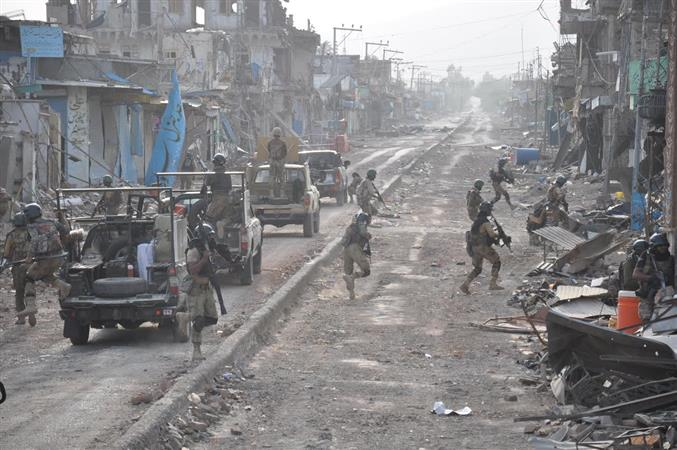
Pakistan army soldiers conducting clearance operations in Mirali, North Waziristan, c. 2015. Pakistan has sought to expel remnants of the Afghan Mujahideen from its borders since the end of the Soviet–Afghan War.

Among the approximately three million Afghan refugees in Pakistan, thousands of children were educated in madrasa boarding schools financed by aid from the US and Gulf monarchies. Since that aid was distributed according to the conservative Islamist ideological criteria of Pakistan's President Muhammad Zia-ul-Haq and Saudi Arabia (and ignoring native Afghan traditions), the schools were part of networks of the favored Hizb-e-Islami party and the Pakistan Deobandi. Iran provided similar help to Shia Islamist groups and punishments to moderate Shia nationalist Afghans.

Cut off from families and local traditions, the madrassa students were "educated to put Deobandi doctrines into action through obedience to the fatwas produced in the madrassas in a spirit of conservatism and religious rigor." As the Afghan students came of age, they formed "the mainstay" of the Taliban in Afghanistan and of the anti-Shia Sipah-e-Sahaba Sunni terror group in Pakistan. But unlike the traditionally non-violent Deobandi, this "hybrid movement" embraced the violence of jihad, and unlike the Islamists of Hizb-e-Islami they were uninterested in "islamizing modernity" of western knowledge or in western knowledge at all. The culture of religious purification, absolute obedience to leaders, and disinterest in anything else, is thought to explain the willingness of Hizb-e-Islami-trained soldiers to bombard Kabul with artillery and kill thousands of civilians, reassured by their commander that the civilians they killed would "be rewarded" in heaven if they were "good Muslims". From 2008 to 2014 "thousands of Shia" have been killed by Sunni extremists according to Human Rights Watch.

=== Notion of "blowback" against the U.S. ===
Blowback, or unintended consequences of funding the Mujahideen, was said to have come to the United States in the 1993 World Trade Center bombing and the September 11 attacks. In the 1993 bombing, all of the participants in the bombing "either had served in Afghanistan or were linked to a Brooklyn-based fund-raising organ for the Afghan jihad" that was later "revealed to be al-Qaeda's de facto U.S. headquarters". Principals in the 2001 attack – Osama Bin Laden and Khalid Sheikh Mohammed – had both fought in Afghanistan, and bin Laden was a lieutenant of Abdullah Azzam. His group, al-Qaeda, returned to Afghanistan to take refuge with the Taliban after being expelled from Sudan. Before the 9/11 attack, al-Qaeda had bombed two U.S. embassies in Africa in 1998, and nearly sank the USS Cole in Yemen in 2000. However, no direct U.S. aid to Bin Laden or any of his affiliates has ever been established.

== Legacy ==
=== Soviet Union ===
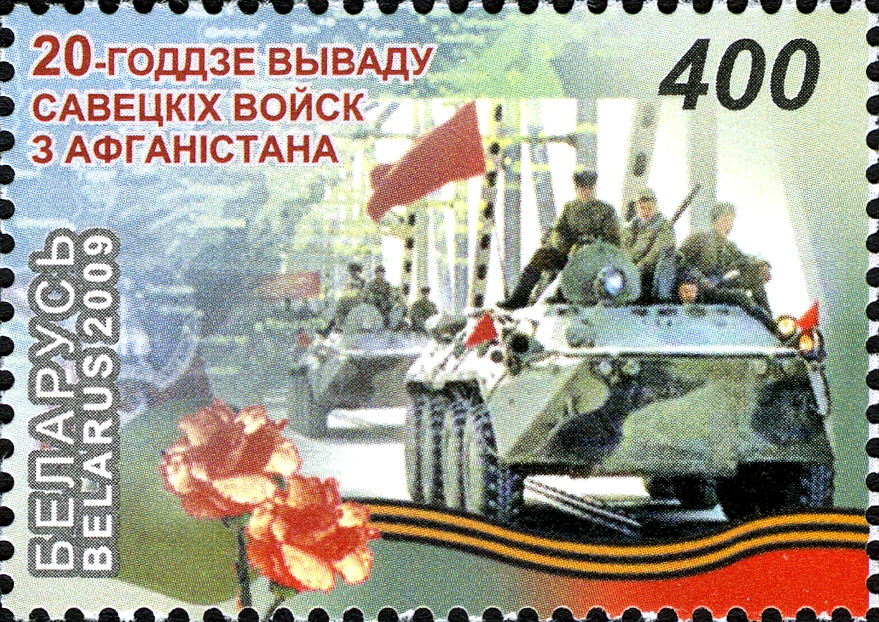
20th Anniversary of Withdrawal of Soviet Military Forces from Afghanistan, stamp of Belarus, 2009

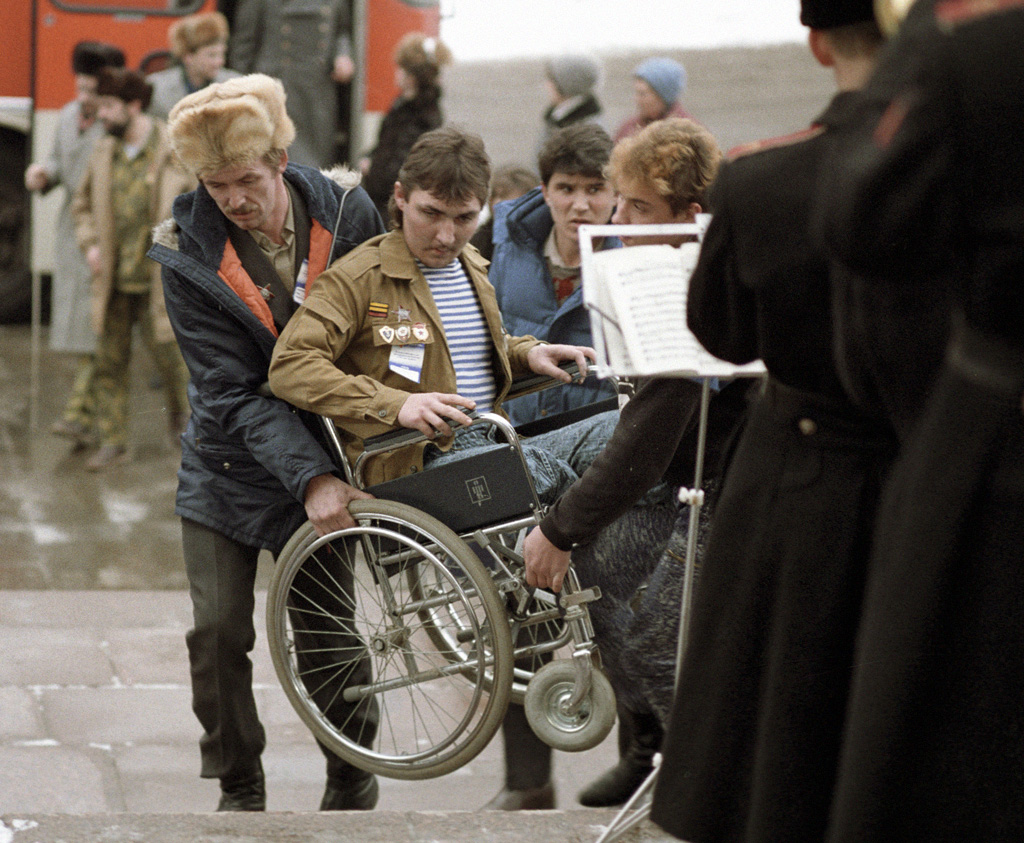
A meeting of Russian war veterans from Afghanistan, 1990

The war left a long legacy in the Soviet Union and its successor states. Along with losses, it brought physical disabilities and widespread drug addiction throughout the USSR.

The remembrance of Soviet soldiers killed in Afghanistan and elsewhere internationally are commemorated annually on 15 February in Russia, Ukraine and Belarus. Veterans of the war are often referred to as афганцы (Afgantsy) in Russian.

==== Russian Federation ====
Commemorating the intervention of 25 December 1979, in December 2009, veterans of the Soviet war in Afghanistan were honoured by the Duma or Parliament of the Russian Federation. On 25 December, the lower house of the parliament defended the Soviet war in Afghanistan on the 30th anniversary of its start and praised the veterans of the conflict. Differing assessments of the war "mustn't erode the Russian people's respect for the soldiers who honestly fulfilled their duty in implementing tasks to combat international terrorism and religious extremists".

Duma member Semyon Bagdasarov (socialist A Just Russia) advocated that Russia had to reject Western calls for stronger assistance to the US-led ISAF-coalition in Afghanistan and also had to establish contacts with the "anti-Western forces"; the Taliban, in case they regain power.

In November 2018, Russian lawmakers from the ruling United Russia and Communist parties jointly approved a draft resolution seeking to justify the Soviet–Afghan War as well as declare null and void the 1989 resolution passed by the Congress of People's Deputies of the Soviet Union which condemned the invasion. Communist lawmaker Nikolay Kharitonov hailed the decision as a victory for "historical truth". Russia's actions were criticized as historical revisionism.

==== Ukraine ====
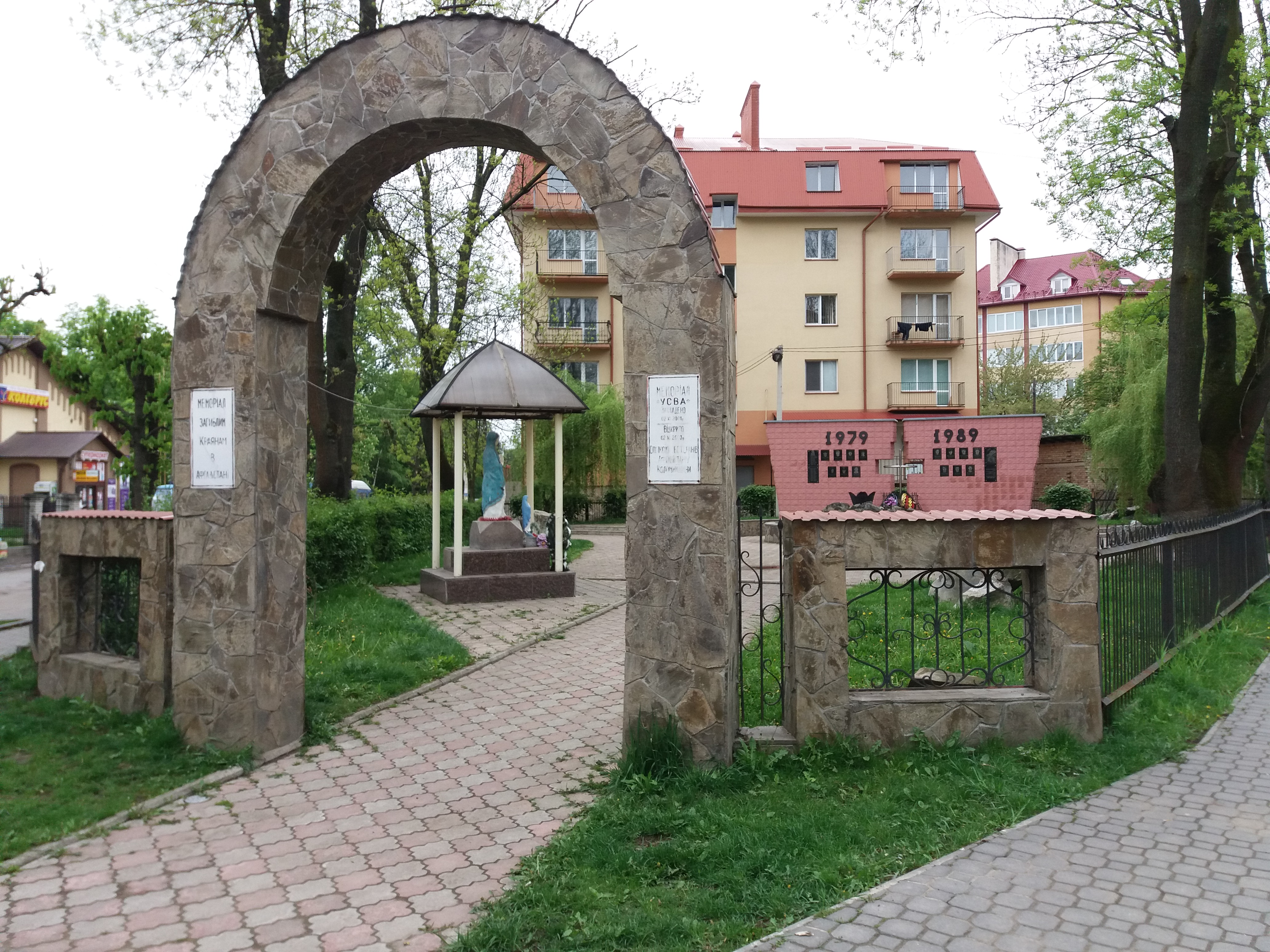
Memorial to soldiers located in Kolomyia, Ukraine

About 25 percent of Soviet servicemen in Afghanistan were Ukrainian, numbering 160,000 of which more than 3,000 died and dozens more went missing.

==== Uzbekistan ====
The war affected many families in post-Soviet Uzbekistan who had lost children. Some 64,500 young men from the Uzbek SSR were drafted in the war. At least 1,522 were killed and more than 2,500 left disabled. The former Uzbekistani president Islam Karimov described the Afghan war as a "major mistake" of the Soviet Union. In 2013, an ethnic-Uzbek ex-Soviet soldier Bakhretdin Khakimov originally from Samarkand who was presumed dead was found living in Afghanistan's Shindand district.

==== Belarus ====
The Soviet–Afghan War has caused grief in the memories of Belarusians, but remains a topic rarely discussed in public. It was the last war the country took part in prior to the Russian invasion of Ukraine in 2022. 28,832 Belarusian natives were involved in the campaign and 732 died. Most casualties were under 20 years old.

The Soviet invasion is considered by many Belarusians as a shameful act, and some veterans have refused to accept medals. Many veterans have had cold relations with the Belarusian regime of Alexander Lukashenko, accusing the government of depriving them of benefits. One Afghanistan veteran, Mikalaj Autukhovich, is considered a political prisoner of the present regime of Belarus.

==== Moldova ====
Around 12,500 residents of the Moldavian SSR served during the war. Of those, 301 Moldovans died in the war. The Union of Veterans of the War in Afghanistan of the Republic of Moldova is a veteran's group based in Moldova that advocates for the well-being of veterans. On 15 May 2000, after the Government's initiative to abolish benefits for veterans of the war in Afghanistan, sympathizers went to Great National Assembly Square. In 2001, the Party of Communists of the Republic of Moldova, which came to power, radically changed the position of all veterans in the country. 15 February is celebrated as the Day of Commemoration of those killed in the War in Afghanistan. The main ceremony is held at the memorial "Sons of the Motherland – Eternal Memory".

=== Afghanistan ===
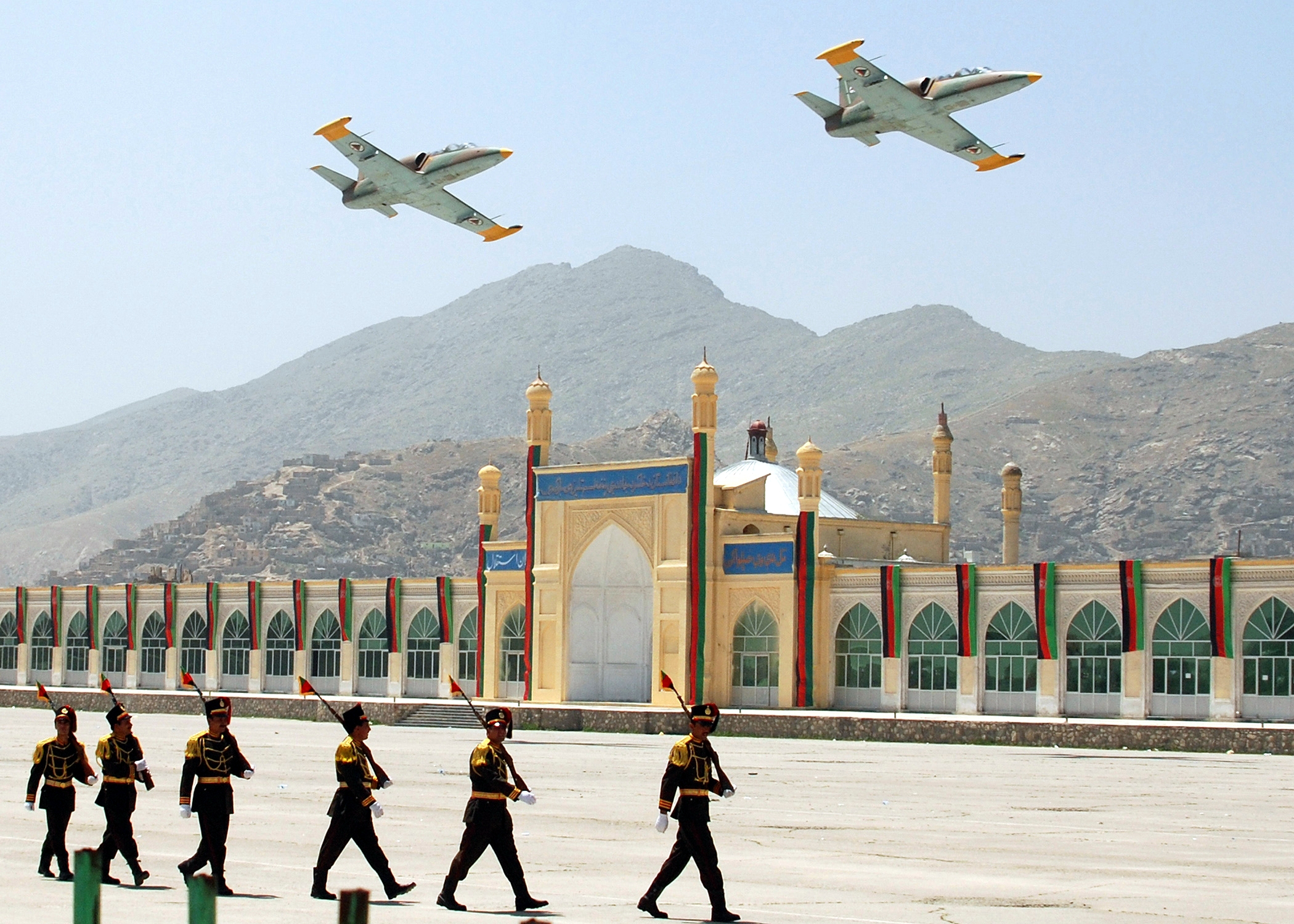
Afghans commemorating Mujahideen Victory Day in Kabul (2007)

The war has left a controversial legacy for Afghan people. Many Afghans see this as a victory over the Soviets and a source of pride. The Mujahideen Victory Day is an annual holiday in Afghanistan on 28 April, to commemorate the subsequent overthrow of the Soviet-backed regime in 1992. However, it is a controversial event to Afghans. Some Afghans honor the fighters and sacrifice made by the Mujahideen to defeat a major power, but others view the victory as a prelude to the brutal 1990s civil war that divided the country politically and ethnically.

==== Role of the United States ====
Pro-Mujahideen Afghans had seen the United States as the main power to help their cause in the Soviet–Afghan War. However, after the Soviet withdrawal in 1989, a growing number of Afghans started blaming the United States for miseries. This was cited as a result of continued American arming and funding of rebels against the pro-Soviet administration in Kabul. Throughout 1989 and 1990, many rebel rocket attacks were fired, nowhere near military targets, that killed dozens of Afghan civilians. Many Afghans also reportedly felt that the U.S. caused the rise of the Taliban by sending billions of dollars in funding for the rebels while leaving the country in Pakistan's hands after 1992. One Afghan ex-prisoner who was affiliated with the U.S. Embassy in Kabul told the Chicago Tribune in 2001:

Afghan people have good memories of the Americans. During the Russian invasion everybody knows that America helped us to get the Russians out. But when Russia collapsed, they had no more interest and they left us alone
