= Abib Sarajuddin =

Afghan Guantánamo Bay detainee

- Born: 1942 (age 83–84)
- Detained at: Guantanamo
- ISN: 458
- Charge: No charge (held in extrajudicial detention)
- Status: Repatriated

Abib Sarajuddin (born 1942) is an Afghan citizen who was held without charge by the United States at the Guantanamo Bay detention camp in Cuba as Extrajudicial Detention (ISN 458). Captured in eastern Afghanistan in January 2002 along with relatives and a neighbor, he was alleged to have been associated with anti-coalition figures and to have provided shelter to Jalaluddin Haqqani, allegations he denied. A Combatant Status Review Tribunal later affirmed his designation as an “enemy combatant,” and his case went before an Administrative Review Board to determine whether he should continue to be detained. Sarajuddin was eventually repatriated to Afghanistan, and in 2008 he gave a detailed interview to the McClatchy News Service describing his detention and its after-effects.

== Summary ==
Sarajuddin, his brother Khan Zaman, his son Gul Zaman, and his neighbor Mohammad Gul, were all captured on the night of January 21, 2002, early during the administration of Hamid Karzai. Gul Zaman, and Mohammad Gul were released. Combatant Status Review Tribunals for Abib Sarajuddin and Khan Zaman confirmed the original determination that they had been correctly classified as "enemy combatants".

== The New York Times article ==
The New York Times published an article about the search for Jalaluddin Haqqani, and how it led to the aerial bombardment of Sarajuddin's home. The New York Times article was presented as an exhibit to Sarajuddin's Combatant Status Review Tribunal.

The New York Times article said that Sarajuddin hosted Jalaluddin Haqqani overnight out of traditional hospitality; that other villagers had reported Haqqani's stay; and that American forces had bombarded Sarajuddin's household from the air, on November 16, 2002, killing everyone except Sarajuddin and Haqqani. According to The New York Times, Sarajuddin, and the other three were arrested on January 21, 2002. The New York Times quoted various American officers who predicted that Sarajuddin would soon be released.

== Combatant Status Review Tribunal ==
Combatant Status Review Tribunals were held in a 3 x 6 meter trailer. The captive sat with his hands cuffed and feet shackled to a bolt in the floor. Three chairs were reserved for members of the press, but only 37 of the 574 Tribunals were observed.

Initially the Bush administration asserted that they could withhold all the protections of the Geneva Conventions to captives from the war on terror. This policy was challenged before the Judicial branch. Critics argued that the USA could not evade its obligation to conduct a competent tribunals to determine whether captives are, or are not, entitled to the protections of prisoner of war status.

Subsequently, the US Department of Defense instituted the Combatant Status Review Tribunals. The Tribunals, however, were not authorized to determine whether the captives were lawful combatants—rather they were merely empowered to make a recommendation as to whether the captive had previously been correctly determined to match the Bush administration's definition of an enemy combatant.

=== Summary of Evidence memo ===
A Summary of Evidence memo was prepared for Abib Sarajuddin's Combatant Status Review Tribunal, on 22 November 2004. The memo listed the following allegations against him:

a. The detainee is associated with forces that have engaged in hostilities against the United States and its coalition partners:
1. In September or October 2001, the detainee worked as a recruiter for Pacha Khan.
2. Pacha Khan provided the detainee with 30,000 rupees in order to rebuild his compound when it had been destroyed by a United States air strike.
3. Pacha Khan, a renegade Pashtun Commander, has been conducting active field operations against the Afghan Transitional Administration (ATA) and coalition military forces.

b. The detainee participated in military operations against the coalition.
1. The detainee was captured near Khowst, Afghanistan by United States Forces on January 20, 2002.
2. The detainee and his three associates when captured had in their possession a modified ICOM VHF transceiver.
3. Coalition forces were fired upon during capture of the detainee.

=== Transcript ===
Sarajuddin chose to participate in his Combatant Status Review Tribunal. On March 3, 2006, in response to a court order from Jed Rakoff the Department of Defense published a summarized transcript from his Combatant Status Review Tribunal.

== Surajadin Abib v. George W. Bush ==
A writ of habeas corpus, Surajadin Abib v. George W. Bush, was submitted on his behalf. In response the Department of Defense published 47 pages of unclassified documents related to his Combatant Status Review Tribunal.

On December 3, 2004 Tribunal panel 27 confirmed his "enemy combatant status".

== Administrative Review Board hearing ==
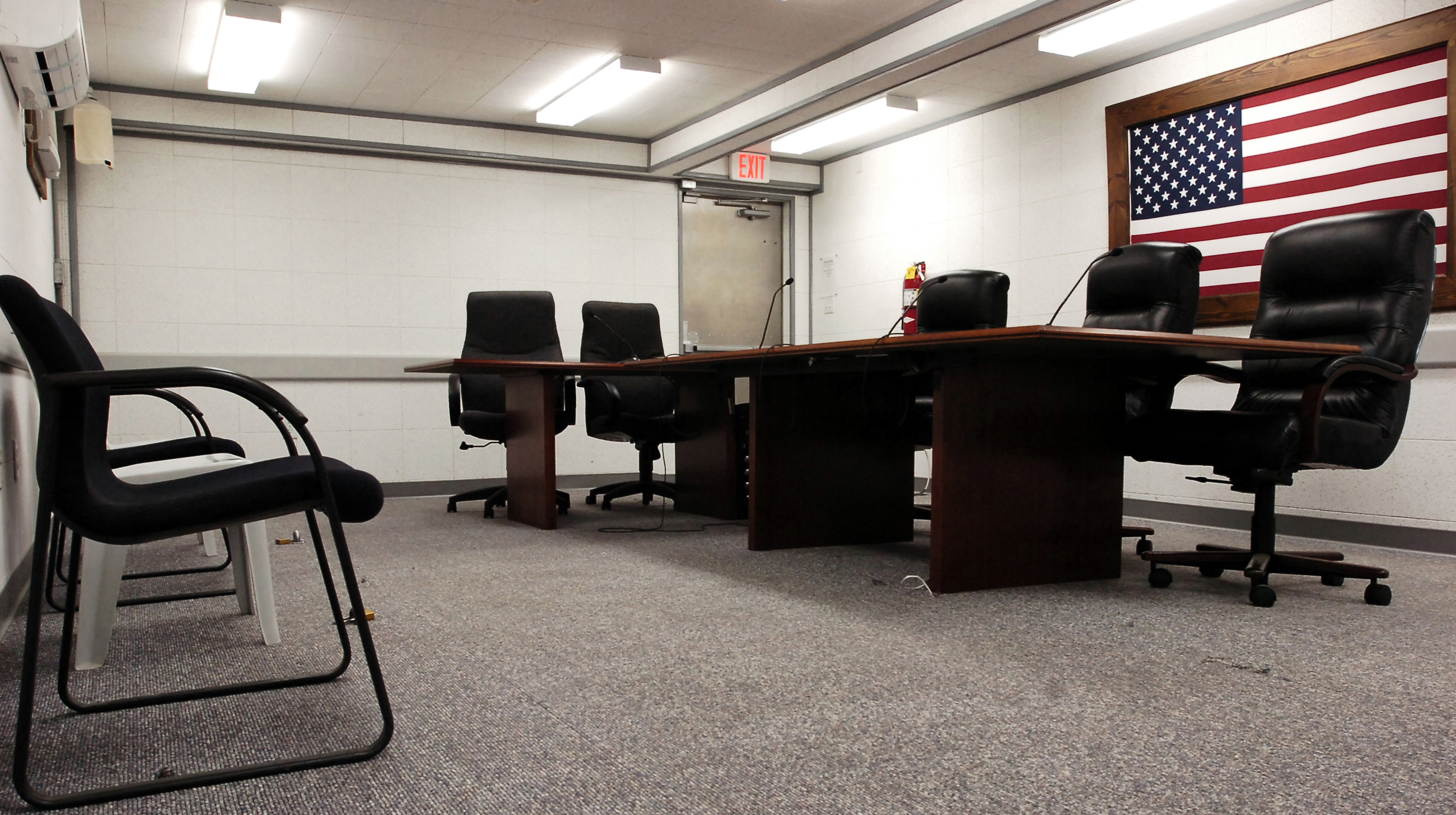
Hearing room where Guantanamo captive's annual Administrative Review Board hearings convened for captives whose Combatant Status Review Tribunal had already determined they were an "enemy combatant".

Detainees who were determined to have been properly classified as "enemy combatants" were scheduled to have their dossier reviewed at annual Administrative Review Board hearings. The Administrative Review Boards weren't authorized to review whether a detainee qualified for POW status, and they weren't authorized to review whether a detainee should have been classified as an "enemy combatant".

They were authorized to consider whether a detainee should continue to be detained by the United States, because they continued to pose a threat—or whether they could safely be repatriated to the custody of their home country, or whether they could be set free.

=== Summary of Evidence memo ===
A Summary of Evidence memo was prepared for Abib Sarajuddin's Administrative Review Board, on 26 September 2005. The memo listed factors for and against his continued detention.

The following factors favor continued detention

a. Commitment
1. The detainee has traveled out of Afghanistan to Saudi Arabia twice and out of Pakistan once. The detainee last traveled to Saudi Arabia was to complete the Haj around ten or twelve years ago (approximately 1990).
2. The detainee indicated his involvement with Tabligh Jamaat, a religious group of ten to fifteen people who prayed together. The detainee stated he was in a Jamaat once and he traveled to different villages in his area and preached about Islam and the Koran.
3. Some al Qaida members have joined the al Dawa al Tabligh religious organization, identifiable with the Jama'at al Tabligh, which was well known for its support to Jihadis causes.

b. Connections/Associations
1. The detainee's relatives say that he and his family gave shelter to Jalaluddin Haqqani, the commander of Taliban forces in the southern provinces of Afghanistan, who was fleeing from Kabul.
2. The detainee was told about a report indicating that his son stated that Jalaluddin Haqqani and his bodyguards did come to his house and requested to stay.
3. Jalaluddin Haqqani was creating a Hezb-e Islami Gulbuddin base in Waziristan, Pakistan, near the border of Afghanistan.

c. Other Relevant Data
1. The detainee explained that in previous interviews he withheld information or provided false information, specifically saying that his house was not bombed.
2. The detainee also stated that he went to the Governor of Khost, Pacha Khan Zadran, to get money to help rebuild his house, in previous interviews the detainee denied that he received money from anyone to rebuild his house.
3. The detainee was seized with three other individuals in an open area near a suspect Taliban facility on 20 January 2002. The Coalition Forces were fired upon during the seizure. The detainee's were in possession of an Icom Very High Frequency (VHF) transceiver.

The following primary factors favor release or transfer

a. The detainee stated that he has never provided shelter (support) to Jalaluddin Haqqani.

b. The detainee claims that he does not know of any al Qaida members or training camps within his village of Zani Khel.

c. The detainee stated he was still glad the Americans came to Afghanistan. The detainee felt that for the last 20 years the Afghans only knew war, but now that the Americans were there they had a chance for peace. The detainee did not harbor any resentment towards Americans for bombing his house and killing members of his family.

d. The detainee stated that he was involved with recruiting people in his village to fight against the Taliban. The detainee's recruiting efforts involved going door to door to request volunteers to fight against the Taliban.

=== Transcript ===
Sarajuddin chose to participate in his Administrative Review Board hearing. In the Spring of 2006, in response to a court order from Jed Rakoff the Department of Defense published a summarized transcript from his Administrative Review Board.

=== Board recommendations ===
In early September 2007 the Department of Defense released two heavily redacted memos, from his Board, to Gordon R. England, the Designated Civilian Official. The Board's recommendation was unanimous The Board's recommendation was redacted. England authorized transfer on 10 December 2005.

== McClatchy interview ==
On June 15, 2008, the McClatchy News Service published articles based on interviews with 66 former Guantanamo captives. McClatchy reporters interviewed Sarajuddin. The McClatchy report repeats Sarajuddin's denial that he had any ties with Jalladudin Haqqani. But, according to the McClatchy report, The New York Times reported the airstrike that destroyed his home, and killed his relatives, occurred when Jalladudin Haqqani was present. According to the McClatchy report neighbors and local officials stated that Sarajuddin did have ties to Haqqani.

Sarajuddin told reporters he suffered ongoing mental problems caused by his experiences in US custody.
