= 2024 Nuristan landslide =

2024 landslide in Afghanistan

2024 Nuristan Landslide
- Date: 2024
- Location: Nakre, Nuristan Province, Afghanistan
- Cause: Heavy rain and snow
- Deaths: At least 25
- Injuries: 8
- Property damage: Around 20 homes destroyed or heavily damaged

A landslide occurred on 19 February 2024 in Nuristan Province of eastern Afghanistan, killing at least 25 people while the village was washed away.

About 20 homes were destroyed or heavily damaged, and more were buried under snow and debris. Several people were also buried under the debris due to the landslide.

== Rescue efforts ==
Bad weather hampered rescue efforts. Snowfall and road closures made rescue operations difficult. Despite the challenges, rescuers relied on shovels, axes and other hand tools to dig through the earth and debris.

== Reactions ==
The Deputy Prime Minister for Political Affairs of Afghanistan Maulvi Abdul Kabir expressed deep regret over the incident and expressed his heartfelt condolences to the families affected by the landslide.
