= 2023 Fayzabad mosque bombing =

Mass murder in Afghanistan by Islamic State

- Part of the Islamic State–Taliban conflict
- Location: Fayzabad, Badakhshan Province, Afghanistan
- Date: 8 June 2023
- Target: Taliban members
- Attack type: Bombing
- Weapon: Explosives
- Deaths: 19+
- Injuries: 38
- Perpetrator: Islamic State – Khorasan Province

On 8 June 2023, a bombing took place during a mourning service at a mosque in Fayzabad, Badakhshan Province, northern Afghanistan. At least 19 people were killed in the blast, while 38 more were injured. The deputy governor of the province, Nisar Ahmad Ahmadi, who was killed that week in a car bombing, was being remembered during the memorial service. The attack happened close to the Nabawi Mosque in Fayzabad, the province's capital. The Islamic State – Khorasan Province claimed responsibility for the attack.
