= Arezo TV =

Afghan satellite television network

Arezo TV تلویزیون آرزو
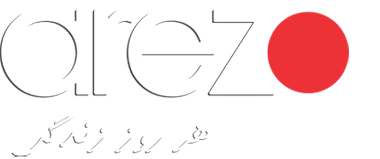
- Type: Satellite television network
- Country: Afghanistan
- Headquarters: Mazar-i-Sharif, Afghanistan
- Owner: Kamal Nabizada
- Launch date: March 21, 2007
- Official website: https://www.arezo.com https://arezo.news/

Arezo TV (Dari: تلویزیون آرزو) is an Afghan satellite television network, based in Afghanistan. The channel is available through the Yahsat 1A and ST-2 satellite. It also has a radio station available in Afghanistan.

The channel launched on Nowruz festival in 2007, in the city of Mazar-i-Sharif before expanding nationwide.

On 4 December 2024, the Taliban raided the channel's offices in Kabul, arresting six employees. The next day, the Ministry for the Propagation of Virtue and Prevention of Vice ordered the closure of the channel for broadcasting "vulgar" content and working with overseas and exiled media outlets.
