= 2024 Qala Bakhtiar bombing =

2024 suicide bombing in Kabul, Afghanistan

- Part of the Islamic State–Taliban conflict
- Location: Qala Bakhtiar neighbourhood, Kabul, Afghanistan
- Date: September 2, 2024
- Target: Civilians, Taliban members
- Attack type: Suicide bombing
- Weapon: Explosive vest
- Deaths: 7 (including the perpetrator)
- Injuries: 13
- Perpetrator: Islamic State – Khorasan Province
- No. of participants: 1
- Motive: Retaliation for Muslim prisoners in Taliban prisons

On September 2, 2024, a suicide bomber detonated explosives strapped to his body outside a government building in Afghanistan's capital Kabul, killing six people and injuring 13 others.

== Background ==
The IS–Taliban conflict is an ongoing insurgency that began in 2015 between the militant groups the Islamic State and the Taliban.

== Attack ==
A man with an explosive vest strapped to his body detonated the explosives outside the General Directorate for Monitoring and Follow-up of Decrees and Directives in the Qala Bakhtiar neighbourhood in Kabul, Afghanistan, killing 6 people and injuring 13 others.

== Victims ==
The six people killed, including a woman, and thirteen injured were all civilians, including some of the building's employees.

== Responses ==
The Kabul police stated they were investigating the attack.

Islamic State claimed responsibility on September 3, 2024, claiming they had killed and wounded at least 45 people, but the claim is unconfirmed.

== See also ==
- 2024 Kabul bus bombing
- 2024 Afghanistan bus shooting
