= 2024 Qorodal bus shooting =

ISIL shooting attack on a bus in Afghanistan

- Part of the Afghan conflict
- Location: Sangi Takht District, Daykundi Province, Afghanistan
- Date: 12 September 2024; ~1 P.M. (GMT+4:30)
- Target: Shia Hazaras
- Attack type: Mass shooting
- Weapon: Machine gun · Kalashnikov rifle · 9mm Glock 9 handgun
- Deaths: 15
- Injuries: 3
- Perpetrator: Islamic State – Khorasan Province (IS-KP)
- No. of participants: 4

On 12 September 2024, fifteen people were killed and three others were injured by four IS–KP militants near Qorodal village of Daykundi Province in Afghanistan. All of the victims were Hazara Shi'ites.

== Attack ==
On 12 September, seventeen men left Qorodal on a minibus and motorcycles for Khamsafid in Ghor Province to pick up a village elder and his wife, who had returned from their Arba'in pilgrimage in Karbala, Iraq. Along the way, outside of Palosang, the group was stopped by four armed masked Islamic State militants, who claimed to be with Taliban government security forces. After searching the group and taking their mobile phones, the militants told the group that they were looking for thieves and had to photograph them to confirm their identities. After taking a photo of one member of the group, one militant told the other men that they should line up for a group photo. As two of the militants held phones, set to record videos, the other two militants opened fire on the group. A survivor, who had run from the scene and played dead in a ditch after being shot in the leg, recounted the men kicking and shooting those who were wounded by gunfire, laughing as they did so, also calling the group infidels and polytheists. Four children who had accompanied the adult victims were spared and ordered to leave the scene. When the attack was over, the four men fled to Ghor Province on their motorcycles.

== Victims ==
The victims were all ethnic Hazara Shi'ites. Most were farmers from Qorodal, while one was a dentist from Ghor Province. Hours after the shooting, IS-K claimed in social media posts that fifteen people had been killed and six injured. Independent sources reported fourteen fatalities and four injured. Thirteen victims were buried in a public ceremony in Qorodal on 13 September. By 24 September, one injured man had died of his wounds, bringing the death toll to fifteen.

== Responses ==
The Taliban government condemned the attack. In the immediate aftermath, victims' families' stated that the Taliban did not investigate the incident and had ignored a series of targeted attacks against Shia Hazaras.

On 13 September, United Nations secretary general António Guterres and United Nations Assistance Mission in Afghanistan issued statements calling the attack "atrocious" and holding the Taliban accountable for the investigation and stronger protection of civilians in the future. The same day, Taliban spokesperson Zabihullah Mujahid stated that the government was actively searching for the perpetrators and committed to safeguarding the general population.

Afghanistan International reported that the gunmen used American-issued weaponry, noting that the arsenal was mostly controlled by the Taliban, who, at the time, denied Islamic State presence in Ghor Province.

== See also ==
- 2024 Kabul bus bombing
- 2024 Qala Bakhtiar bombing
