= Ministry of Refugee and Repatriation =

Government ministry of Afghanistan

Ministry of Refugee and Repatriation (MoRR)
- Ministry flag

Agency overview
- Formed: 1986 (as Office of Reintegration)
- Preceding agency: Office of Reintegration
- Minister responsible: Abdul Kabir, Minister of Refugees and Repatriations
- Website: morr.gov.af/en

The Ministry of Refugee and Repatriation (MoRR) is an Afghan government agency that provides services to refugees and displaced persons.

== History ==
MoRR was initially established as the Office of Reintegration in 1986 and was run by a ministerial committee until 1990. When the Mujahideen took over in 1992, the Office of Reintegration was renamed and upgraded to the Ministry of Return and Repatriation. MoRR has always been affected by political changes in the country. During the Islamic Emirate, it was reduced to a directorship and merged with the Ministry of Works, Social Affairs, Martyrs and the Disabled. After the fall of the first Islamic Emirate and the establishment of a transitional government in 2001 based on the international Bonn Agreement, the office was once again upgraded to the Ministry of Return and Repatriation.

In December 2024, the acting minister Khalil Haqqani was killed alongside five others by a suicide bombing in Kabul, the Islamic State later claimed responsibility.

== Ministers ==
- Khalil Haqqani (until 2024)
- Abdul Kabir (since 2025)

Former Minister of Refugees and Repatriation under the Islamic Republic:

- Dr. Moh. Azam Dadfar (Faryab)
- Ustad Akbar Akbar (2006)
- Abdul Karim Brahui (2009.02.09-2010.08.24)
- Jamahir Anwari (2010.10.11-2014.09.30)
- Jamahir Anwari (acting Minister, 2014.10.01)
- Fazl Ahmad Azimi (acting Minister, 2014.12.09)
- Sayed Hussain Alemi Balkhi (2015.01.27, 2017.11.12, 2020.08.31)
- Noor Rahman Akhlaqi (nominated and acting, 2020.08.31) (confirmed, 2020.11.30)

Deputy Minister of Refugees:

- Arsala Kharoti Mohammad Arsalan Kharouti (2021.09.21, 2022.10.19, 2023.07.30)
- Mawlavi Abdul Rahman Rashid, Deputy Minister of Refugees and Repatriation (2025.02.17)
- Malang Rasuli (2006.05)
- Dr. Samad Hami (2011, 2012.04.24)
- Dr Alema Alema (2016.10.07)
