= Anas Haqqani =

Afghan Taliban leader, commander and poet (born c. 1994)

- انس حقانی
- Anas Haqqani in 2021

Personal details
- Born: 1994 (age 31–32) Afghanistan
- Party: Taliban
- Relations: Khalil Haqqani (uncle); Sirajuddin Haqqani (brother); Abdulaziz Haqqani (brother)
- Parent: Jalaluddin Haqqani (father)
- Education: Darul Uloom Haqqania, Pakistan

Military service
- Allegiance: Islamic Emirate of Afghanistan
- Branch/service: Haqqani network

Anas Haqqani (Pashto: انس حقانی [aˈnas haqɑˈni]; born c. 1994) is an Afghan politician and military leader, who is a senior leader of the Islamic Emirate of Afghanistan and within the Taliban movement, and was also a member of the Taliban's negotiation team in its political office in Doha, Qatar.

He is the son of fighter and warlord Jalaluddin Haqqani, who fought both the Soviets and the Americans, and a brother of Sirajuddin Haqqani, now the Minister of Interior of the Islamic Emirate of Afghanistan .

He has an interest in Pashto poetry, himself being a poet.

American commentator Bill Roggio says he is a "key propagandist, fundraiser and ambassador for the Haqqanis", mainly in the Arab world.

== Early life and education ==
Anas is a son of Jalaluddin Haqqani, a Pashtun mujahid and military leader of pro-Taliban forces in both Afghanistan and Pakistan.

Through his Pashtun mother, his only surviving brothers are Sirajuddin Haqqani and Abdulaziz Haqqani, while his father’s second wife is an Arab from the UAE whose children live with her in her home country.

Anas studied in a local school in North Waziristan, Pakistan, until the 10th grade, while also being homeschooled by his father in Islamic studies.

He later did some short-term courses in English, Economics, Politics and Computer Science but had to stop his higher education when he was captured by the Americans.

== Detention ==
Anas was detained in Bahrain on 12 November 2014, at the age of 20, when he was legally returning from visiting releasees from Guantanamo Bay detention camp at the Taliban's political office in Doha, Qatar. American soldiers arrested him and took him back to Qatar.

After a day of interrogation, Anas was transferred to Kabul, the capital of Afghanistan and held for nine months at the headquarters of the government intelligence agency, the National Directorate of Security. He was then imprisoned at Bagram prison. Anas said that he was detained to try to get the Taliban to hold peace talks with the Afghan government, when the Taliban wanted to negotiate with the US instead. He was twice sentenced to death while in prison.

In defense of Anas, Afghan Taliban spokesperson Suhail Shaheen said he was a student and had nothing to do with the militancy. He was released on 18 November 2019 in a prisoner exchange.

== Post-release ==
Haqqani went to Kabul after it fell to the Taliban in August 2021, as did his uncle Khalil Haqqani. Anas said that representatives of the Haqqani family needed to be there to negate talk that the Taliban was disunited and factionalized and that the Haqqani network was not truly part of it.

In August 2021, Anas Haqqani and Ahmadullah Wasiq visited the Afghanistan Cricket Board. They met with cricket board officials and national players and assured them of all possible cooperation for the promotion of cricket.

In September 2021, Haqqani received criticism from Hindus on Twitter for calling Mahmud of Ghazni a "renowned Muslim warrior & Mujahid of the 10th century" who "established a strong Muslim rule in the region from Ghazni & smashed the idol of Somnath".

Upon Prince Harry’s announcement that he had tallied up Taliban members he killed in war and not thought of them as people, Haqqani tweeted: "Mr Harry! The ones you killed were not chess pieces, they were humans; they had families who were waiting for their return... I don't expect that the International Criminal Court will summon you or the human rights activists will condemn you, because they are deaf and blind for you."
