= 4-Hydroxy-2-alkylquinoline =

Class of chemical compounds

Chemical structure of 4-hydroxy-2-heptylquinoline, a common form of HAQ

4-Hydroxy-2-alkylquinolines (HAQs) are a class of intracellular signaling molecules associated with iron chelation. HAQs are produced by various types of bacteria, such as Pseudomonas aeruginosa, and are involved in quorum sensing.

The overproduction of these molecules, with their pro-oxidative effects, leads to antibiotic properties.
