= Jalaluddin Haqqani =

Afghan leader of the Haqqani network (1939–2018)

Jalaluddin Haqqani جلال الدين حقاني
- Jalaluddin Haqqani
- Born: c. 1939; Paktia Province, Kingdom of Afghanistan
- Died: September 3, 2018 (aged 78–79); Afghanistan
- Burial place: Afghanistan
- Relatives: Khalil Haqqani (brother); Sirajuddin Haqqani (son); Anas Haqqani (son); Abdulaziz Haqqani (son)
- Military career
- Allegiance: Haqqani Network (1970s–2018); Taliban (1995–2018)
- Service years: 1970s–2018
- Conflicts: Cold War; Soviet–Afghan War; Operation Magistral; Siege of Khost; Siege of Urgun; Battle of Jaji; Battle for Hill 3234; War on terror: War in Afghanistan (2001–2021); War in North-West Pakistan

Jalaluddin Haqqani (Pashto: جلال الدين حقاني, romanized: Jalāl al-Dīn Ḥaqqānī; 1939 – 3 September 2018) was an Afghan insurgent commander who founded the Haqqani network, an insurgent group who fought in guerilla warfare against US-led NATO forces and the former Islamic Republic of Afghanistan government that they supported.

He distinguished himself as an internationally sponsored insurgent fighter in the 1980s during the Soviet–Afghan War, including in Operation Magistral. He earned U.S. praise and was called "goodness personified" by the U.S. officials. US officials have admitted that during the Soviet–Afghan War, he was a prized asset of the Central Intelligence Agency (CIA). Former U.S. president Ronald Reagan called Jalaluddin Haqqani a "freedom fighter" during the Soviet–Afghan War. By 2004, he was directing a pro-Taliban insurgent group to launch a holy war in Afghanistan. In 2016, U.S. Lieutenant General John W. Nicholson Jr. claimed that the U.S. and NATO were not targeting Haqqani's network in Afghanistan.

Media reports emerged in late July 2015 that Haqqani had died the previous year. According to the reports, he died in Afghanistan and was buried in Khost Province of Afghanistan. These reports were denied by the Taliban and some members of the Haqqani family. On 3 September 2018, the Taliban released a statement announcing that Haqqani had died after a long illness in Afghanistan.

== Early life ==
Jalaluddin was born in 1939 in the village of Karezgay in the Zadran District of Paktia Province, Afghanistan. He was an ethnic Pashtun from the Zadran tribe of Khost. His father was a wealthy landowner and trader. The family later moved to Sultankhel. He started advanced religious studies at Darul Uloom Haqqania, a Deobandi Islamic seminary (darul uloom), in Pakistan in 1964. He graduated in 1970 with an advanced qualification that entitled him to the status of mawlawi, and added "Haqqani" to his name, as some alumni of Darul Uloom Haqqania had done.

After King Zahir Shah's exile and President Daoud Khan rise to power in 1973, the political situation in Afghanistan began to slowly change. A number of parties, such as the People's Democratic Party of Afghanistan (PDPA) and other people, were seeking power. Haqqani was one of them, and after being suspected of plotting against the government, he went into exile and based himself in and around Miranshah, Pakistan. From there he began to organise a rebellion against the government of Daoud Khan in 1975. After the 1978 Marxist revolution by the PDPA, Haqqani joined the Hezb-i Islami movement of Mawlawi Mohammad Yunus Khalis.

== Military career ==
=== Mujahideen commander ===
In the 1980's, Jalaluddin Haqqani was cultivated as a "unilateral" asset of the CIA and received tens of millions of dollars in cash for his work in fighting the Soviet-led Afghan forces in Afghanistan, according to an account in The Bin Ladens, a 2008 book by Steve Coll. He reputedly attracted generous support from prosperous Arab countries compared to other resistance leaders. At that time, Haqqani helped and protected Osama bin Laden, who was building his own militia to fight Soviet-backed Afghanistan. Mujahids under his command were also responsible for the assassination of Faiz Mohammed and two other diplomats in Lake Tiga, Paktia Province.

The influential U.S. Congressman Charlie Wilson, who helped to direct tens of millions of dollars to the Afghan Islamists, was so taken by Haqqani that he referred to him as "goodness personified". Charles Wilson also desired to fire a Stinger missile at one of the Soviet helicopters. Haqqani was happy to make Charles Wilson's wartime fantasy come true. They dragged chains and tires on road to create dust cloud which will attract the Soviet helicopters. However, none of the Soviet helicopters came and Charles Wilson was unable to fire any missile. This episode highlights the type of relationship which U.S. officials and Haqqani network used to share. He was a key US and Pakistani ally in resisting the Soviet-backed Afghanistan. Some news media outlets report that Haqqani even received an invitation to, and perhaps even visited, President Ronald Reagan's White House, although the photographs used to support the allegation of such a meeting have cast doubt that Haqqani ever visited the US. (The pictures originally purporting to show this meeting are, in fact, of Mohammad Yunus Khalis.)

During the rule of Najibullah in 1991, Haqqani captured the city of Khost, which became the first communist city to fall to the jihadis. After the fall of Kabul to the Mujahideen forces in 1992, he was appointed Justice Minister of the Islamic State of Afghanistan, and refrained from taking sides in the fratricidal conflict that broke out between Afghan factions during the 1990s, a neutrality that was to earn him respect.

=== Relations with the Taliban ===
Haqqani was not an original member of the Taliban; in 1995, just prior to the Taliban's occupation of Kabul, he switched his allegiance to them. In 1996–97, he served as a Taliban military commander north of Kabul, and was accused of ethnic cleansing against local Tajik populations. During the Taliban government, he served as the Minister of Borders and Tribal Affairs and governor of Paktia Province.

In October 2001, Haqqani was named the Taliban's military commander. He may have had a role in expediting the escape of Osama bin Laden. Initially the Americans tried to convince him to turn against the Taliban. He refused their offers on the grounds that, as a Muslim, he was duty bound to resist them as "infidel invaders", just as he had the Soviets in earlier decades. His base in Khost was attacked and four Guantanamo detainees—Abib Sarajuddin, Khan Zaman, Gul Zaman and Mohammad Gul—were captured and held because American intelligence officials received a report that one of them had briefly hosted Haqqani shortly after the fall of the Taliban.

A September 2008 US airstrike that allegedly targeted Haqqani resulted in the deaths of between ten and twenty-three people. The missile hit the house of Haqqani in the village Dandi Darpa Khail in North Waziristan and a close by seminary. The madrasah, though, was closed and Haqqani had previously left the area. Haqqani has been accused by the United States of involvement in the 2008 Indian embassy bombing in Kabul and the February 2009 Kabul raids.

=== Role in the Taliban insurgency ===
Haqqani was the commander, with his son Sirajuddin, of the Haqqani network. The network is made up of resistance forces waging a jihad against US-led NATO forces and the Islamic Republic of Afghanistan. On 16 October 2011, "Operation Knife Edge" was launched by NATO and Afghan forces against the Haqqani network in south-eastern Afghanistan. Afghan Defense Minister, Abdul Rahim Wardak, explained that the operation will "help eliminate the insurgents before they struck in areas along the troubled frontier". Both he and his son, Sirajuddin appear to have been the first Taliban to adopt the Iraqi tactic of using suicide bombers, and their network is accused of engaging in kidnappings, beheadings, the killing of women, and assassinations. George Gittoes, the Australian maker of Pashto-language films at his Yellow House in Jalalabad says Haqqani, who has befriended him, would be ready to support Ashraf Ghani in future Afghan elections.

== Personal life ==
Haqqani was fluent in Persian, Arabic, Urdu and his native Pashto language. He had two wives, a Pashtun wife and an Arab wife from the United Arab Emirates, and had at least seven sons from his Pashtun wife:

- Sirajuddin Haqqani – He currently leads the day-to-day activities of the Haqqani network.
- Anas Haqqani – Senior member of the network. He was arrested on 15 October 2014 by the Afghan forces, and sentenced to death in 2016. He was released in a prisoner swap in November 2019.
- Abdulaziz Haqqani – A key leader of the network and son of the Pashtun wife. He is currently serving as the deputy of his elder brother Interior Minister Afghanistan Sirajuddin Haqqani.
- Nasiruddin Haqqani – He was a key financier and emissary of the network. He spoke fluent Arabic and traveled to Saudi Arabia and the United Arab Emirates for fundraising. He was killed by unknown assailants in Bhara Kahu, in the eastern part of the Islamabad Capital Territory, Pakistan, on 11 November 2013.
- Badruddin Haqqani – He was an operational commander of the network. He was killed in a US drone strike on 24 August 2012 in North Waziristan. Badruddin was targeted and killed by US forces for planning and directing the deadly suicidal VBED operation carried out in south Kabul on May 18, 2010. The attack killed 5 American and 1 Canadian service members, as well as a dozen or more Afghan civilians who were innocently going about their own business along the road.
- Mohammed Haqqani – He was a military commander of the network and was killed in a US drone strike on 18 February 2010 in North Waziristan.
- Omar Haqqani – He was killed leading Haqqani network fighters during a US military operation in Khost province in July 2008.

== Death ==
On 3 September 2018, the Taliban released a statement via Twitter proclaiming Haqqani's death of an unspecified terminal illness in Afghanistan. He was buried in Afghanistan.

== See also ==
- List of Deobandis
- Deobandi jihadism

Military offices
New command	Leader of the Haqqani network 1970–2018	Succeeded by Sirajuddin Haqqani
