= November 2023 Kabul bombing =

Islamic State attack in Afghanistan

On 7 November 2023, seven people were killed and 20 others injured in a bombing in Kabul, Afghanistan. A bomb exploded on a minibus carrying Shiites from the Hazara community in Dashti Barchi, in the west of the city. Later the same day, Islamic State – Khorasan Province claimed responsibility.
