= Amanullah Haqqani =

Pakistani religious and political figure

Maulana Amanullah Haqqani

Member of the National Assembly
- In office 2002–2007
- Constituency: Lakki Marwat

Provincial Minister of Religious Affairs
- In office 1990–1993

Personal details
- Died: December 10, 2018
- Political party: Jamiat Ulema-i-Islam (JUI-F)
- Profession: Politician, Religious Leader

Sheikh Amanullah Haqqani (died 10 December 2018) was a Pakistani religious and political figure. He served as Provincial Minister of Religious Affairs and Provincial Amir of Jamiat Ulema-e-Islam (F) in Khyber Pakhtunkhwa. He was also elected Member of the National Assembly from Lakki Marwat district in the 2002 elections.

== Career ==
Haqqani was elected to the National Assembly in 2002 on a Muttahida Majlis-e-Amal (MMA) ticket.

== Controversies ==
Haqqani was vocal in his criticism of the arrangement of funds by the Khyber Pakhtunkhwa government. In 2022 he accused the government of misusing the anti-dengue funds for the by-election campaign. In 2017 he also filed a petition to block the Peshawar bus project citing technical and legal flaws.

== Death ==
Haqqani died on 10 December 2018.
