= Khalil Haqqani =

Afghan politician (1966–2024)

Haji Khalil Haqqani
- خلیل‌الرحمن حقاني

Acting Minister of Refugee and Repatriation
- In office 7 September 2021 – 11 December 2024
- Prime Minister: Hasan Akhund
- Supreme Leader: Hibatullah Akhundzada
- Succeeded by: Abdul Kabir

Personal details
- Born: c. February 1966 Paktia Province, Afghanistan
- Died: 11 December 2024 (aged 57–58) Kabul, Afghanistan
- Cause of death: Assassination by bombing
- Party: Taliban
- Relations: Jalaluddin Haqqani (brother); Sirajuddin Haqqani (nephew); Anas Haqqani (nephew); Abdulaziz Haqqani (nephew)
- Education: Darul Uloom Haqqania
- Occupation: Politician; mujahideen leader

Military service
- Allegiance: Taliban (Islamic Emirate of Afghanistan)
- Branch/service: Haqqani network
- Years of service: until 2021
- Rank: Chief of operations (until 2009); Commander (2009–2021)
- Commands: Chief of security for Kabul (10 August 2021 – 7 September 2021)
- Battles/wars: Soviet–Afghan War; Operation Magistral; Siege of Khost; Siege of Urgun; Battle of Jaji; Battle for Hill 3234; War in Afghanistan; War in North-West Pakistan; 2021 Taliban offensive

Khalil Rahman Haqqani (Note: Also reported as Khalil Ur-Rahman Haqqani, Khalil al-Rahman Haqqani, Khaleel Haqqani, Khalil Ahmad Haqqani, among other spellings. (Pashto: خلیل‌الرحمن حقاني, pronounced [xalilʊrahˈmɑn haqɑˈni]) (c. February 1966 (Note: c. 1958–1966 according to Rewards for Justice.) – 11 December 2024) was an Afghan politician and military leader. A Pashtun mujahideen commander, he was designated Specially Designated Global Terrorist by the United States.

Haqqani had been the acting Minister of Refugee and Repatriation in the internationally unrecognized Taliban regime since 7 September 2021. He was a prominent member of the insurgent Haqqani network.

Haqqani was killed by a suicide bomber on 11 December 2024. The Islamic State – Khorasan Province claimed responsibility.

== Early life and activities ==
Haqqanis date and place of birth is most likely to be in February 1966 in the Paktia Province of Afghanistan although the Rewards for Justice Program stated that Haqqani may have been born between 1958 and 1964. He belonged to the Zadran tribe of ethnic Pashtuns. During the Afghan War, Haqqani engaged in international fundraising for the Taliban and supported Taliban operations in Afghanistan. In 2002, he deployed men under his charge to reinforce al-Qaida in Paktia Province. In 2009, he aided in the detention of enemy prisoners captured by the Haqqani network and the Taliban. In 2010, he provided funding to the Taliban in Logar Province of Afghanistan. Haqqani also carried out orders from his nephew, Sirajuddin Haqqani, a leader of the Haqqani network who was designated a terrorist in March 2008 under Executive Order 13224.

On 9 February 2011, the United States Department of the Treasury designated Khalil Haqqani a Specially Designated Global Terrorist under Executive Order 13224 and offered a US$5 million bounty for him as one their most wanted terrorists. He was listed with the title of a Haji and supposed to be residing in Peshawar, Miram Shah, North Waziristan Agency in Pakistan and in Paktia Province of Afghanistan.

On 9 February 2011, the United Nations added Khalil Haqqani to the 1988 Sanctions List (TAi.150), pursuant to paragraph 2 of resolution 1904 (2009), for association with al-Qaeda, Osama bin Laden or the Taliban for "participating in the financing, planning, facilitating, preparing, or perpetrating of acts or activities by, in conjunction with, under the name of, on behalf of, or in support of" or "otherwise supporting acts or activities of" the Taliban.

The Haqqani network was founded by Khalil Haqqani's brother Jalaluddin Haqqani. In the mid-1990s they joined Mullah Omar's Taliban regime. The UN determined that Khalil Haqqani engaged in fundraising activities on behalf of the Taliban and the Haqqani network and conducted international travel to obtain financial supporters. As of September 2009, Haqqani obtained financial support from the Arab states of the Persian Gulf and from sources in South Asia and East Asia. In addition, he acted on behalf of Al-Qaida and was associated with their military operations, including the deployment of reinforcements to Al-Qaida elements in Paktia Province.

== Government positions ==
In August 2021, after the fall of Kabul, Haqqani was placed in charge of security for Kabul during the transition of power. On 7 September 2021, Khalil Haqqani was appointed Minister of Refugees for the Islamic Emirate of Afghanistan in the internationally unrecognized Taliban regime.

== Death and funeral ==
On 11 December 2024, a suicide bomber killed Haqqani and five others at his ministry office in Kabul. The Washington Post described it as the most significant death among the Taliban leadership since the military takeover of Afghanistan in 2021.

Haqqani was buried in Paktia on 12 December 2024. The funeral, which was attended by thousands of people, took place amid strict security measures.

The Islamic State – Khorasan Province (IS-KP) later claimed responsibility for the attack. According to a report issued by IS's news outlet Amaq, an IS-KP militant waited outside the minister's office and detonated explosives as he walked out.
