= Abdulaziz Haqqani =

Afghan Taliban leader and commander

Hafiz Abdulaziz Haqqani
- عبدالعزیز حقاني
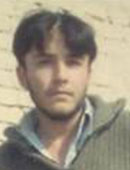
- Haqqani in 2020
- Born: c. 1987 – c. 1989
- Education: Darul Uloom Haqqania
- Relatives: Jalaluddin Haqqani (father); Khalil Haqqani (uncle); Sirajuddin Haqqani (brother); Anas Haqqani (brother)
- Military career
- Allegiance: Islamic Emirate of Afghanistan
- Branch: Haqqani network
- Nickname: Aziz Haqqani

Abdulaziz Haqqani (Pashto: عبدالعزيز حقاني, romanized: Abd-ul-’Azīz Haqqānī, pronounced [(ʔ)abdulaˈziz haqˈqɑni]; born c. 1987 – c. 1989), also known as Aziz Haqqani (Pashto: عزيز حقاني), is an Afghan senior member of the Haqqani network, one of the sons of its former leader Jalaluddin Haqqani, and deputy to his brother Sirajuddin Haqqani. While his brother operates as the overall leader of the network, Abdulaziz functions as his deputy and operational commander in charge of planning and undertaking all major attacks.

== Life ==
Abdulaziz Haqqani was born in Afghanistan between the years 1987 and 1989 to Jalaluddin Haqqani and his first wife. He is referred to by the Taliban with the honorific 'Hafiz', indicating that he has completely memorized the Qur'an.

After the deterioration of Jalaluddin Haqqani's health, his son Sirajuddin Haqqani took over operations as the overall leader of the Haqqani network. Another son of Jalaluddin, Badruddin Haqqani, took up a high-level role in the organization as an operational commander, before being killed in an American drone strike in 2012. Following his brother Badruddin Haqqani's killing, Abdulaziz Haqqani assumed responsibility for all major Haqqani Network attacks, heavily engaging in military decision-making and logistical processes. According to FDD's Long War Journal, as head of Haqqani network operations, Abdulaziz Haqqani maintains strong ties to al-Qaeda, Lashkar-e-Jhangvi, Jaish-e-Muhammad, Lashkar-e-Tayyiba, and Tehrik-e-Taliban Pakistan.

Subsequent to the 2021 Taliban Offensive and restoration of the Islamic emirate of Afghanistan's rule over the country, he was officially appointed to the position of deputy to Sirajuddin Haqqani.

== Sanctions ==
Although the Haqqani network has been sanctioned by the United States as a Foreign Terrorist Organization since September 2012, Abdulaziz Haqqani has only been sanctioned as a Specially Designated Global Terrorist since 25 August 2015, with a reward of up to $5 million USD for information leading to his location. This move was decried by the Taliban, who described Abdulaziz Haqqani as simply a "low-ranking Mujahid of Islamic Emirate," whilst stating that the sanctions would be ineffective.

In March 2025, the Afghan interior ministry announced the lifting of bounties placed by the United States on Haqqani and his relatives Sirajuddin Haqqani and Yahya Haqqani.
