= Mujahideen Victory Day =

Political Afghan holiday

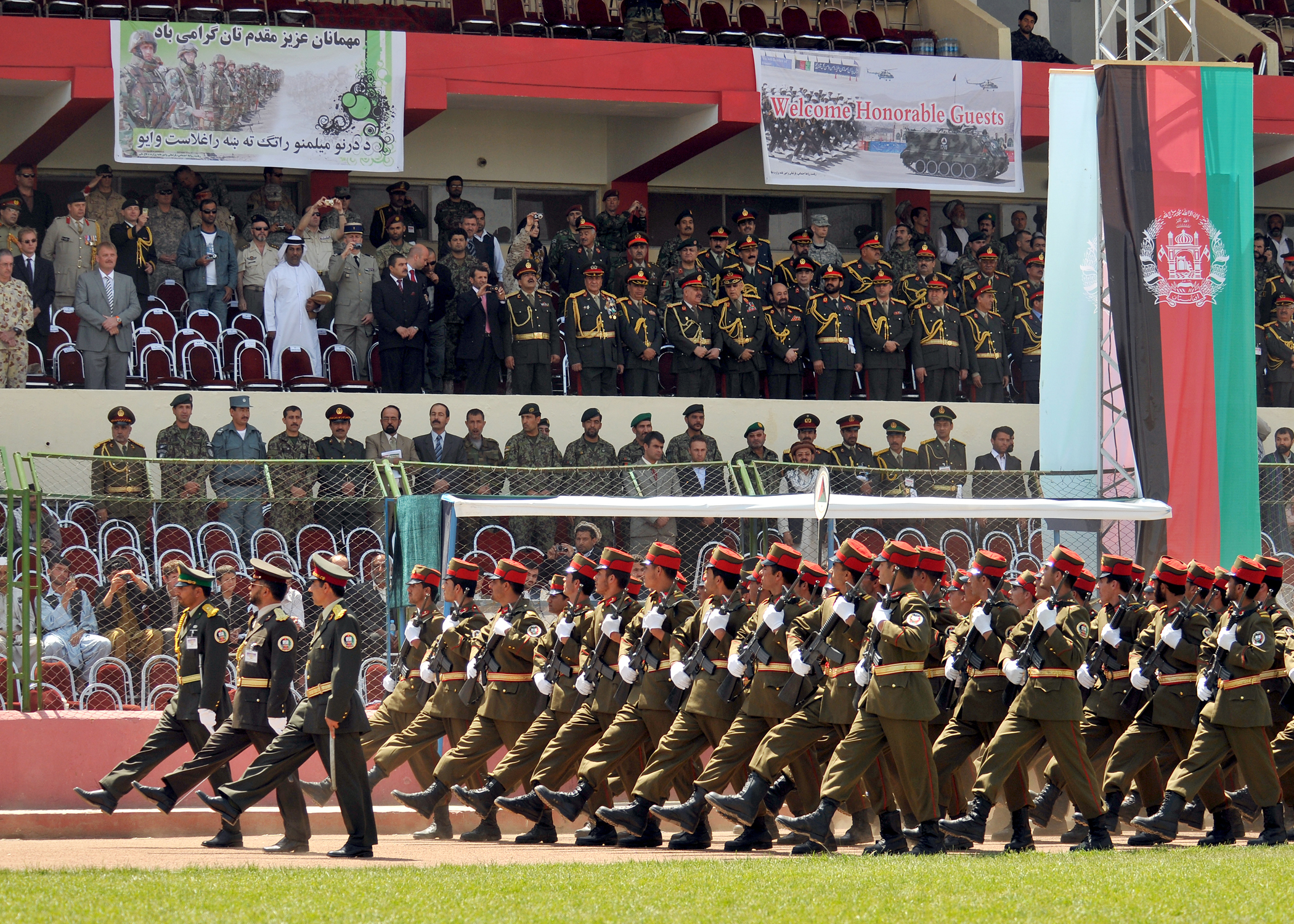
- Members of the Afghan Armed Forces marching during the 2010 Mujahideen Victory Day parade in Kabul, Afghanistan.
- Official name: Persian: سالروز پیروزی مجاهدین; Pashto: د مجاهدينو د بريا ورځ
- Observed by: Afghanistan
- Date: 28 April
- Next time: 28 April 2027
- Frequency: Annual

Mujahideen Victory Day is a political holiday observed in all parts of Afghanistan, falling on the 28 April each year. It commemorates the day when Afghan Mujahideen rebel forces overthrew the Communist government in 1992. It is celebrated mostly by former Mujahideen in Afghanistan. Some Afghans are against celebrating the day because it marks the start of the civil war.

== Current festivities ==
- 2006: Karzai gave a public speech at Kabul's Chaman-e-Hozori park.
  - Also on Victory Day 2006, Afghan parliament member and activist Malalai Joya stood to denounce alleged mujahideen atrocities, and was threatened with death by other parliament deputies. Reporters without Borders journalist Omid Yakmanish was beaten by two parliamentarians while attempting to film the debate.
- 2007: Afghan President Hamid Karzai awarded medals to Mujahideen veterans in commemoration of the holiday.
- 2012: Cancelled due to security reasons, threats by Taliban insurgents.

== History ==
After the monarchy in Afghanistan, the Marxist People's Democratic Party of Afghanistan was born took power making Afghanistan a communist country. This was not well received by the people. The Afghans, especially in the rural areas, viewed the new government as un-Islamic.

At the time the Cold War brewed, leading to the Soviets aiding the Democratic Republic of Afghanistan, while the Mujahideen formed against the Soviets and the government, triggering the Soviet-Afghan War. The civil war left the country in ruins and gave birth to Al-Qaeda.

In total, approximately one million casualties occurred due to the war and the holiday marks the end of one of the country's most deadly conflicts.

== See also ==
- Afghan Independence Day
- Durrani Empire
- Hotaki dynasty
