= Abdul Kabir =

Afghan Taliban leader

Mawlawi Abdul Kabir
- عبدالکبیر
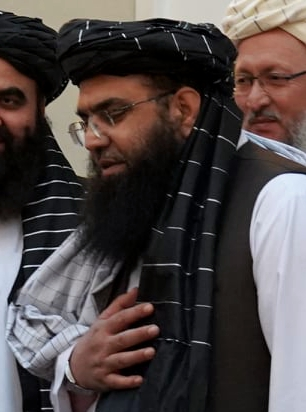
- Kabir in 2021

Minister of Refugee and Repatriation
- Incumbent
- Assumed office 18 January 2025
- Supreme Leader: Hibatullah Akhundzada
- Prime Minister: Hasan Akhund
- Preceded by: Khalil Haqqani

Acting Deputy Prime Minister of Afghanistan
- 3rd Deputy Prime Minister for Political Affairs; 4 October 2021 – 9 January 2025
- Supreme Leader: Hibatullah Akhundzada
- Prime Minister: Hasan Akhund
- 2nd Deputy Prime Minister before 25 January – 13 November 2001
- Supreme Leader: Mullah Omar
- Prime Minister: Mohammad Rabbani

Acting Prime Minister of Afghanistan
- Pro tempore (Note: Abdul Kabir carried out the duties of acting prime minister while Hasan Akhund spent two months in Kandahar recovering from an illness.); 17 May 2023 – 17 July 2023
- Supreme Leader: Hibatullah Akhundzada
- Prime Minister: Hasan Akhund
- caretaker 16 April – 13 November 2001
- Supreme Leader: Mullah Omar

Member of the Leadership Council
- Incumbent
- Assumed office 15 August 2021
- In exile May 2002 – 15 August 2021

Personal details
- Born: 1958/1963 (age 59–65) Paktia, Kingdom of Afghanistan
- Occupation: Politician, Taliban member
- Political affiliation: Taliban

Mawlawi Abdul Kabir (Pashto: عبدالکبير) is an Afghan politician and a senior member of the Taliban leadership. Since 18 January 2025, he has been the Minister of Refugee and Repatriation. From 4 October 2021 to 9 January 2025, he was also the acting third Deputy Prime Minister for Political Affairs of Afghanistan in the internationally unrecognized Taliban government. In the previous Taliban regime, he was the acting Prime Minister of Afghanistan from 16 April to 13 November 2001.

== Career ==
The United Nations reports that during the first Taliban regime, Kabir was Second Deputy of the Taliban's Council of Ministers; Governor of Nangarhar Province; and Head of the Eastern Zone. The U.N. reports that Kabir was born between 1958 and 1963, in Paktia, Afghanistan, and is from the Zadran tribe. The U.N. reports that Kabir is active in terrorist operations in Eastern Afghanistan.

In April 2002, Abdul Razzak told the Associated Press that Kabir was believed to have fled Nangarhar to Paktia, along with Ahmed Khadr.

The Chinese News Agency Xinhua reported that Abdul Kabir was captured in Nowshera, Pakistan, on 16 July 2005. Captured with Abdul Kabir were his brother Abdul Aziz, Mullah Abdul Qadeer, Mullah Abdul Haq, and a fifth unnamed member of the Taliban leadership.

On 19 July 2006, United States Congressman Roscoe G. Bartlett listed Abdul Kabir as a former suspected terrorist who the US government no longer considers a threat.

In spite of these reports, intelligence officials quoted in Asia Times indicated Kabir and other senior Taliban leaders may have been in North Waziristan, Pakistan, during Ramadan 2007, planning an offensive in southeastern Afghanistan.

Xinhua reported on 21 October 2007, quoting from an account from Daily Afghanistan, that Abdul Kabir had been appointed commander in Nangarhar, Laghman, Kunar and Nooristan provinces.

A report on 21 February 2010, stated that Kabir was captured in Pakistan as a result of intelligence gleaned from Mullah Baradar, himself taken into custody earlier in the month. Kabir was later released.

On January 9, 2025, Kabir was appointed Acting Minister for Refugees and Repatriation by Supreme Leader Hibatullah Akhundzada, following the assassination of Khalil Haqqani. He was also dismissed from his post as Acting Deputy Prime Minister. He was sworn in on 18 January.

== Notes ==
Political offices
Preceded by Mohammad Rabbani	Acting Prime Minister of Afghanistan; 2001	Vacant Title next held by Hasan Akhund (acting, 2021)
New seat	Acting Third Deputy Prime Minister of Afghanistan for Political Affairs; 2021–2025; Served under: Hasan Akhund (acting PM)	Vacant
