= Sirajuddin Haqqani =

Afghan Taliban leader (born 1979)

Khalifa; Sirajuddin Haqqani
- سِراج الدّين حقاني
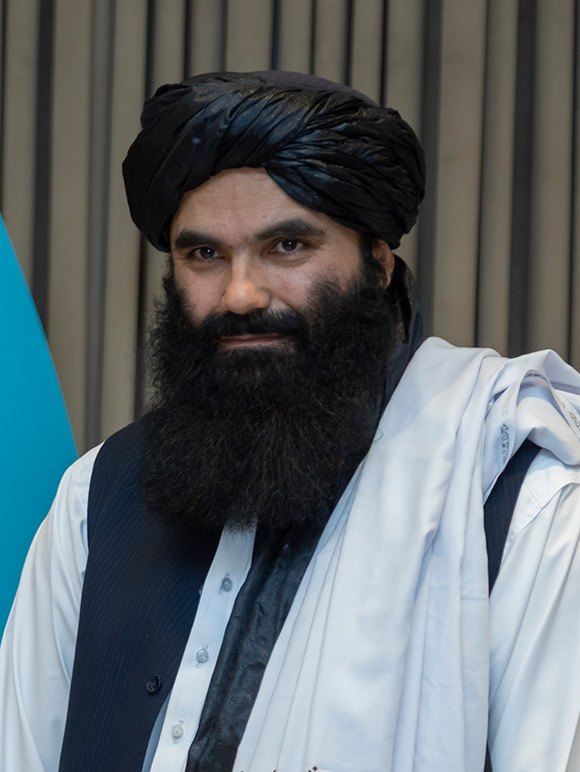
- Haqqani in 2026

Minister of Interior Affairs
- Incumbent
- Assumed office 7 September 2021 (Note: Acting: 7 September 2021 – 15 August 2025)
- Supreme Leader: Hibatullah Akhundzada
- Prime Minister: Hasan Akhund
- Deputy: Ibrahim Sadr
- Preceded by: Masoud Andrabi

First Deputy Leader of Afghanistan
- Incumbent
- Assumed office 15 August 2021 Serving with Mullah Yaqoob and Abdul Ghani Baradar
- Supreme Leader: Hibatullah Akhundzada
- Preceded by: Amrullah Saleh (as First Vice President)
- In exile 25 May 2016 – 15 August 2021
- Supreme Leader: Hibatullah Akhundzada
- Preceded by: Hibatullah Akhundzada

Leader of the Haqqani network
- Incumbent
- Assumed command 2018
- Preceded by: Jalaluddin Haqqani

Second Deputy Leader of the Islamic Emirate of Afghanistan
- In exile 29 July 2015 – 25 May 2016
- Leader: Akhtar Mansour
- Preceded by: Akhtar Mansour (2010)
- Succeeded by: Mullah Yaqoob

Personal details
- Born: December 1979 (age 46) Afghanistan or Khyber Pakhtunkhwa, Pakistan
- Relations: Khalil Haqqani (uncle); Abdulaziz Haqqani (brother); Anas Haqqani (brother)
- Parent: Jalaluddin Haqqani
- Education: Darul Uloom Haqqania
- Political affiliation: Taliban

Military service
- Allegiance: Taliban
- Years of service: c. 2008-present
- Commands: Haqqani network
- Battles/wars: War on terror Afghan Civil War (1996–2001); War in Afghanistan (2001–2021); Taliban insurgency 2021 Taliban offensive Islamic State–Taliban conflict Afghanistan–Tajikistan border skirmishes 2026 Afghanistan–Pakistan war

Sirajuddin Haqqani (Pashto: سراج الدين حقاني, romanized: Sirāj al-Dīn Ḥaqqānī, Pashto pronunciation: [si.rɑd͡ʒ.u.'din (h)a.'kɑ.ni], Dari pronunciation: [sɪ.rɑːd͡ʒ.ʊ(d̪).d̪íːn (h)ä(q).qɑ:.niː]; aliases Khalifa and Siraj Haqqani; born December 1979) is an Afghan leader who is the first deputy leader of Afghanistan and the interior minister in the post-2021 Taliban regime. He has been a deputy leader of the Taliban since 2015, and was additionally appointed to his ministerial role after the 2021 withdrawal of foreign troops. He has led the Haqqani network, a semi-autonomous paramilitary arm of the Taliban, since inheriting it from his father in 2018, and has primarily had military responsibilities within the Taliban.

As interior minister, he has control over much of the country's internal security forces. As deputy leader of the Taliban, he oversaw armed combat against American and coalition forces, reportedly from a base within North Waziristan District in Pakistan. Haqqani is wanted by the FBI for questioning due to his role in the 2008 Kabul Serena Hotel attack that killed six people, including American citizen Thor David Hesla, as well as an attempted assassination of Afghan President Hamid Karzai, with the U.S. State Department designating him a Specially Designated Global Terrorist and offering a reward of $10 million for information about his location that will lead to his arrest. In May 2025, the reward offer was removed “as a result of continued diplomatic efforts” between the Taliban and the United States.

== Early life and education ==
Sirajuddin Haqqani is the son of Jalaluddin Haqqani, a Pashtun mujahid and military leader of pro-Taliban forces in Afghanistan and Pakistan. Born in December 1979, Sirajuddin, who has brothers from both of his father's wives (Jalaluddin having also married an Arab woman whose children live with her in the United Arab Emirates) grew up in Pakistan. Like his other siblings, he was initially homeschooled by his father before enrolling at the Anjuman Uloom Al-Qur'an, a madrasa in Khyber Pakhtunkhwa, in 1984, at the age of 5.

He spent his childhood in Miramshah, North Waziristan, Pakistan, and later attended Darul Uloom Haqqania, an influential Deobandi Islamic seminary in Akora Khattak, Khyber Pakhtunkhwa, Pakistan, known to have produced many graduates who ultimately joined the Taliban. The name Haqqani itself was taken from the Darul Uloom Haqqania, attended by many leading figures of the Haqqani network.

His younger brother Mohammad Haqqani, also a member of the network, died in a drone attack on 18 February 2010, in Dande Darpakhel, a village in North Waziristan. Other brothers who died include Nasiruddin, Badruddin and Omar. Among the brothers alive, Abdulaziz Haqqani, is also highly influential in the Haqqani Network and currently functions as his deputy while Anas Haqqani has some political and militant influence as well.

== Activities ==
=== Militancy ===
Haqqani has admitted planning the 14 January 2008 attack against the Serena Hotel in Kabul which killed six people, including American citizen Thor David Hesla. Haqqani confessed his organization and direction of the planning of an attempt to assassinate Hamid Karzai, planned for April 2008. His forces have been accused by coalition forces of carrying out the late December 2008 bombing in Kabul at a barracks near an elementary school that killed several schoolchildren, an Afghan soldier, and an Afghan guard; no coalition personnel were affected.

In November 2008, The New York Times reporter David S. Rohde was kidnapped in Afghanistan. His initial captors are believed to have been solely interested in a ransom. Sirajuddin Haqqani is reported to have been Rohde's last captor prior to his escape.

Several reports indicated that Haqqani was targeted in a massive U.S. drone attack on 2 February 2010, but that he was not present in the area affected by the attack.

In March 2010, Haqqani was described as one of the leaders on the "Taliban's Quetta Shura". Sirajuddin Haqqani's deputy, Sangeen Zadran, was killed by a US drone strike on 5 September 2013.

In June 2011, after the execution of Zar Ajam by the government of Afghanistan, Haqqani promised to avenge Ajam's death by targeting judges and the courts involved in the case. Ajam, a 17-year-old Pakistani boy from North Waziristan, had taken part in a terrorist attack in February 2011 against the New Kabul Bank in Jalalabad, resulting in the deaths of 40 people.

Haqqani was appointed the second deputy leader of the Islamic Emirate of Afghanistan by Leader Akhtar Mansour upon the latter's election on 29 July 2015. He was elevated to the position of first deputy leader when Hibatullah Akhundzada, who was the first deputy under Mansour, assumed the leadership on 25 May 2016.

Jalaluddin Haqqani died in 2018 after a long illness and Sirajuddin became the leader of the Haqqani network, though Jalaluddin may have turned over operational control as early as 2008.

On 31 May 2020, British Taliban expert Antonio Guistozzi told Foreign Policy that Sirajuddin Haqqani was infected with COVID-19, which resulted in him being absent from the group's leadership mix.

=== Taliban government since 2021 ===
When the Taliban retook control of the country in August 2021, the leader of the Islamic Emirate became Afghanistan's de facto ruler and head of state, and the deputy leader became the country's second-most-powerful position. Haqqani was appointed the acting interior minister of Afghanistan in the Caretaker Cabinet of the Islamic Emirate on 7 September.

Haqqani gave his first ever on-camera interview in May 2022, with Christiane Amanpour in Kabul. Following the interview, he was described by Amanpour as the "heir" to Akhundzada in his capacity as deputy leader and "the most powerful member, frankly, of the current government, and indeed in the Taliban movement" due to Akhundzada's isolation in Kandahar. In the interview, Haqqani acknowledged concern by the international community over the treatment of women by the Taliban, and claimed women's rights would be respected, despite recent crackdowns, including an abrupt closure of secondary schools for girls and a decree requiring women to wear full-body coverings when in public. He claimed the schools would reopen once dress code issues were resolved, and said the veil decree was only advisory, despite evidence to the contrary. Haqqani also said the Taliban wants good relations with the United States and the international community, and no longer sees the U.S. as an enemy.

In February 2023, Haqqani issued a rare rebuke of the government's hardline policies, which was widely interpreted as a criticism aimed at Akhundzada, who has governed in an increasingly autocratic and ultraconservative fashion. Speaking at a religious school in Khost Province, he said: "Monopolizing power and hurting the reputation of the entire system are not to our benefit... more responsibility has been placed on our shoulders and it requires patience and good behavior and engagement with the people." Government spokesman Zabihullah Mujahid indirectly reacted by saying criticism of the emir should be made in private, without naming Haqqani.

In June 2024, Haqqani made his first visit overseas since the takeover, to meet UAE President Mohamed bin Zayed Al Nahyan in Abu Dhabi. The US criticized the UAE government for allowing him to visit despite the travel ban imposed by United Nations Security Council Resolution 1988.

In March 2025, the Afghan interior ministry announced the lifting of bounties placed by the United States on Haqqani and his relatives Abdul Aziz Haqqani and Yahya Haqqani.

On 15 August 2025, Supreme Leader Hibatullah Akhundzada reappointed Haqqani and the rest of the cabinet to their positions on a permanent basis.

== Writings ==
In 2010, Haqqani released a 144-page Pashto-language book, a training manual entitled Military Lessons for the Benefit of the Mujahedeen, where he appears more radical than the Talibans, as it shows influences from al-Qaida, supporting beheading and suicide bombings while legitimizing targeting the West, asking Muslims there to "blend in, shave, wear Western dress, be patient." Writing in November 2011, an analyst said some 10,000 copies of the book were printed and distributed in Afghanistan and Pakistan in a single month, describing Haqqani's work as being "printed on high-quality paper, with black-and-white photos and solidly bound, the manual for guerrillas and terrorists opens with directions for how to set up a jihadi cell, how to obtain financing, how to recruit members, and how to train them", also containing details about deadly weapons, how to make and use explosive devices and which infrastructure to target, such as railroad tracks, bridges and more.

When Akhtar Mansour was elected as the new leader of the Taliban in 2015, a communication was posted quoting Sirajuddin Haqqani: "My particular recommendation to all members of the Islamic Emirate is to maintain their internal unity and discipline."

Sirajuddin Haqqani wrote an opinion piece titled "What We, the Taliban, Want", which appeared in The New York Times on 20 February 2020.

== Notes ==
Political offices
Vacant Title last held by Akhtar Mansour (2010)	– In exile – Second Deputy Leader of the Islamic Emirate of Afghanistan; 2015–2016 with Hibatullah Akhundzada; Served under: Akhtar Mansour	Succeeded by Mullah Yaqoob
Preceded by Amrullah Saleh (2021) as First Vice President; Hibatullah Akhundzada (2016)	First Deputy Leader of Afghanistan; 2021–present In exile 2016–2021 with Mullah Yaqoob; Abdul Ghani Baradar; Served under: Hibatullah Akhundzada	Incumbent
Preceded by Ibrahim Sadr (Acting)	Acting Interior Minister of Afghanistan; 2021–present	Incumbent
Military offices
Preceded by Jalaluddin Haqqani	Leader of the Haqqani network 2018–present	Incumbent
