= Embassy of Afghanistan, Canberra =

Afghan embassy in Australia

Embassy of Afghanistan in Canberra
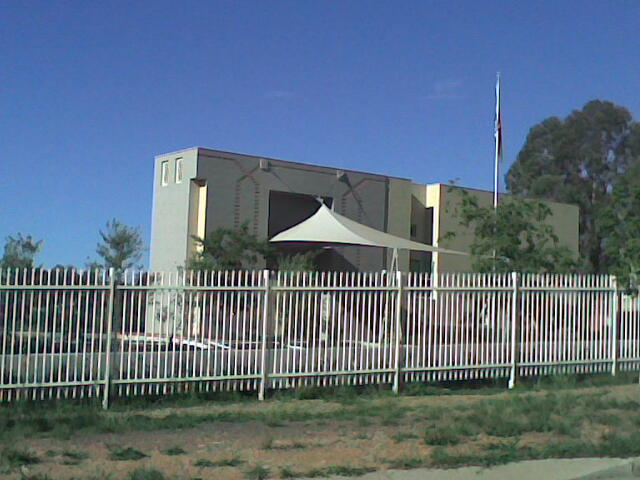
- Chancery of the Embassy of the Islamic Republic of Afghanistan
- Location: Canberra
- Ambassador: Vacant
- Website: n/a

The Embassy of Afghanistan in Canberra is the suspended diplomatic mission of the State of Afghanistan to the Commonwealth of Australia. It was also accredited to New Zealand and Fiji. It is located in the suburb of Deakin, at 4 Beale Crescent. It was established by the former Islamic Republic of Afghanistan. Following the Taliban’s capture of Kabul on 15 August 2021, the embassy continued to operate autonomously until its operations were suspended on 30 June 2026.

== History ==
Before the establishment of the post‑Taliban Islamic Republic of Afghanistan, Afghanistan did not maintain a resident diplomatic mission in Australia. Following an agreement in April 1993 to restore consular-level relations, Afghanistan maintained an honorary consulate in Canberra from October 1994. A resident embassy was subsequently established in 2002, initially operating from leased premises in Deakin. Construction of a permanent chancery followed, and the current embassy building in Canberra was officially opened on 18 August 2005 by Afghan Foreign Minister Dr Abdullah Abdullah and Australian Foreign Minister Alexander Downer.

Following the Taliban’s capture of Kabul on 15 August 2021, the embassy continued to operate autonomously under Ambassador Wahidullah Waissi and staff appointed by the former Islamic Republic of Afghanistan. It was one of several Afghan diplomatic missions worldwide that remained open in this form for a period.

== Current status ==
At a December 2025 Senate estimates hearing, DFAT officials said the embassy could not continue operating as it had because it was unable to communicate with a home government, could not provide full consular or other services, and could not support itself financially. Foreign Minister Penny Wong said there was no ongoing funding or support from a sending state of the kind contemplated by the Vienna Convention on Diplomatic Relations. Officials also said practical risks were accruing for people relying on embassy documents or services, including possible offences and the risk of being denied entry, stranded, detained or deported while travelling.

On 30 January 2026, the embassy and DFAT announced that the embassy’s operations would be suspended after 30 June 2026 because of prevailing circumstances, constraints beyond the embassy’s control, and concern that the situation could not continue indefinitely. The parties reaffirmed that they did not recognise the Taliban as the legitimate representatives of the Afghan people, that Australia had no intention of accepting a Taliban-appointed diplomat, honorary consul or other representative, and that Australia would continue to protect the embassy’s premises, property and archives as host nation.

== List of Ambassadors ==
- 2002-2005: Mahmoud Saikal
- 2005-2007: Mohammad Anwar Anwarzai
- 2007-2011: Amanullah Jayhoon
- 2011-2015: Nasir Andisha
- 2017–2026: Wahidullah Waissi

== See also ==
- List of Afghan Ambassadors to Australia
- Afghan Film Festival in Australia
