= Bagh-e-Naran =

Recreational park in Hayatabad Peshawar

Coordinates: 33°58′40″N 71°26′40″E

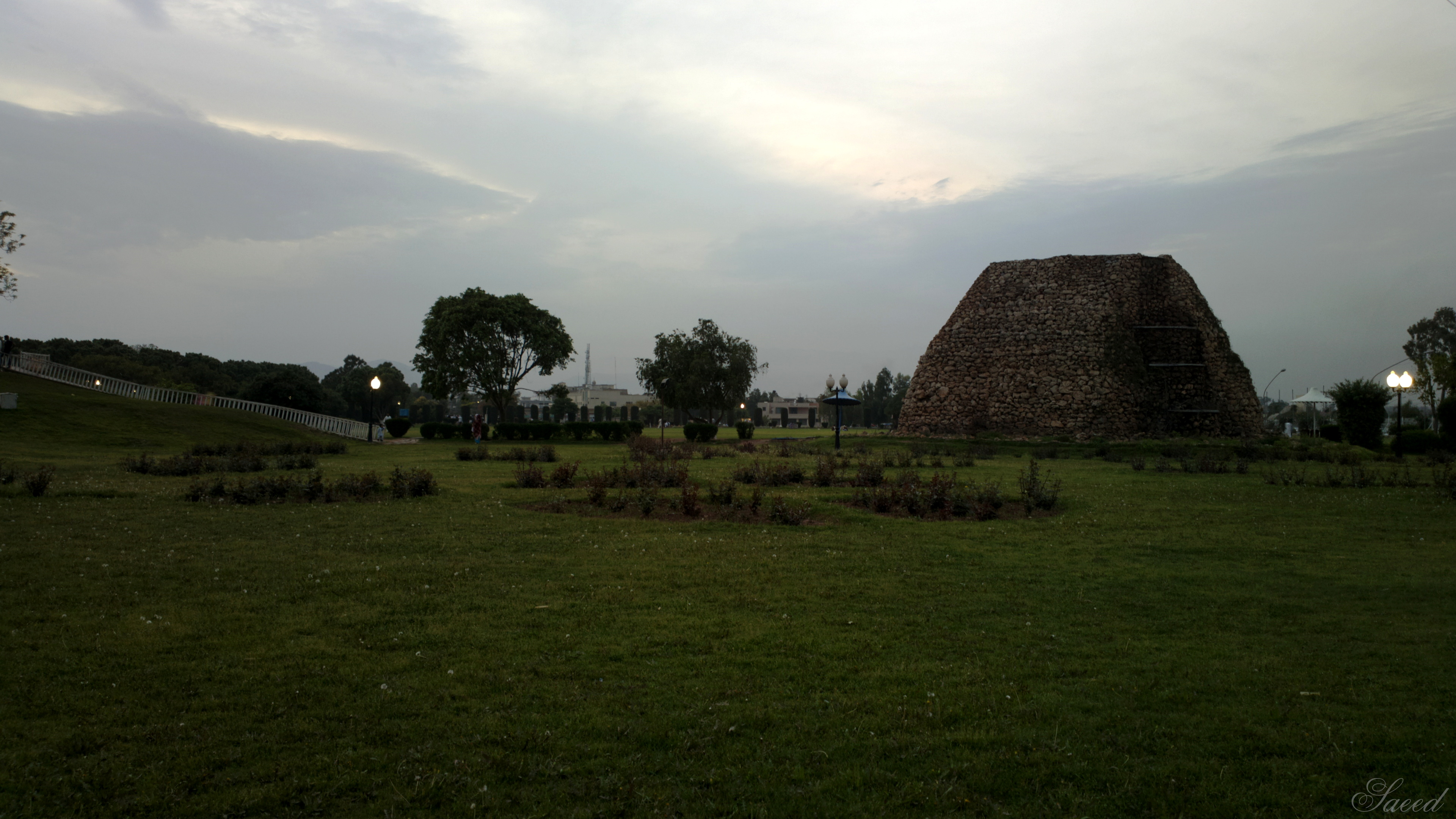
- Interactive map of Bagh-e-Naran
- Location: Hayatabad, Peshawar
- Operator: Government of Khyber Pakhtunkhwa
- Open: All year
- Status: Functional

Bagh-e-Naran (Urdu: باغِ ناران) is a recreational park located in Phase 1, Hayatabad, Peshawar, Pakistan. It is one of the largest gardens in Hayatabad, and part of it is a zoo. The literal meaning of "Bagh-e-Naran" in local languages is "Garden Valley". It is located in Phase 1&2 Hayatabad and close to Tatara Park. There is also a playground for children.

== Mini zoo ==
A mini zoo has been set up in Bagh Naran where monkeys, Nile cows, deer, zebras, and some birds are kept.

== Developments ==
In January 2023, during a surprise visit to Bagh Naran, Special Assistant to the Chief Minister of Khyber Pakhtunkhwa, Kamran Bangash, was briefed by the Director General of Peshawar Development Authority and Deputy Director of PDA Horticulture. Recognizing Bagh Naran as a park frequented by both Pakistanis and Afghan citizens, Bangash ordered the establishment of an international standard visitor facility point and the swift opening of the walking track to the public. He also instructed the installation of benches, chairs, washrooms, and additional plants wherever space permitted in the garden.

=== Extension ===
On 15 December 2022 Khyber Pakhtunkhwa government announced the extension of Bagh-e-Naran. The estimated cost is Rs 535 million. Additional multiple facilities are planned to be established, including jogging and cycling tracks, an open-air gym, and a playground.
