= List of film festivals in Oceania =

This is a list of film festivals in Oceania.

== Australia ==
=== Australian Capital Territory ===
Name	Est.	City	Type	Notes
Afghan Film Festival in Australia	2019	Canberra	National	
Canberra International Film Festival	1996	Canberra	International	First known as the Australian International Film Festival, it is held annually in October.

=== New South Wales ===
Name	Est.	City	Type	Notes
Bondi Short Film Festival	2000	Bondi Beach	Short film	An annual one-day competitive festival open to amateur filmmakers
Byron Bay Film Festival	2006	Byron Bay	Special interest	An annual nine-day independent festival
Dungog Film Festival	2007	Dungog	National	Showcases Australian films in a non-competitive environment that celebrates and promotes Australian screen culture
Flickerfest	1983	Bondi Beach	Special interest	Short-film festival
Popcorn Taxi	1999	Sydney	Special interest	A yearlong film screenings event with a focus on discussing the filmmaking process
SmartFone Flick Fest	2015	Sydney	International	Showcases films made using mobile phones, by filmmakers of all ages.
Sydney Film Festival	1954	Sydney	International	Held annually for two weeks in June
Tropfest	1993	Darlinghurst, Sydney	Special interest	Annual short film festival

=== Queensland ===
Name	Est.	City	Type	Notes	Website
Australia Independent Film Festival	2017	Brisbane	Short Films, Animations, Documentaries, Songs, Experimental Films	Annual live screening event for Australian and International Independent cinema.	/www.ausindefest.com/
Brisbane International Film Festival	1992	Brisbane	International	Focuses on films from the Pacific Rim.	https://web.archive.org/web/20121019170841/http://www.biff.com.au/
Gold Coast Film Festival	2001	Gold Coast	Feature Films, Documentaries, Short Films	Annual event for Australian and International films.	/www.gcfilmfestival.com/

=== South Australia ===
Name	Est.	City	Type	Notes	Website
Adelaide Film Festival	2002	Adelaide	International	A biennial film festival held in October.	adelaidefilmfestival.org

=== Victoria ===
Name	Est.	City	Type	Notes
Melbourne International Film Festival	1951	Melbourne	International	Held annually in July or August. It is the oldest and largest film festival in Australia.
Melbourne Queer Film Festival	1991	Melbourne	Special interest	Held annually, it is one of the oldest and largest LGBT film fests.
Melbourne Underground Film Festival	2000	Melbourne	Special interest	Annual alternative festival programmes adult-theme, genre, sexual and artistic-concept films.
Popcorn Taxi	1999	Melbourne	Special interest	A yearlong film screenings event with a focus on discussing the filmmaking process.
Alliance Française French Film Festival	1989	Melbourne	International, Independent	
St Kilda Film Festival	1983	Melbourne	International, Independent	
Indian Film Festival of Melbourne	2010	Melbourne	International	Showcases the best of Indian cinema, from blockbusters to arthouse. Held annually in August.
Heathcote Film Festival	2010	Heathcote, Victoria	Short films	Showcases Australian and international short films. Held annually in August or September.

=== Western Australia ===
Name	Est.	City	Type	Notes
Perth International Arts Festival	1953	Perth	International	Lotterywest Films
Revelation Perth International Film Festival	1998	Perth	International, Independent	Independent films, underground films, documentary, hybrid works

=== Nationwide ===
Name	Est.	City	Type	Notes
Japanese Film Festival	1997	State capitals, nationwide	Japanese content	In its 15th year as of 2011. Conducted annually during the final quarter of the year. Selected films are screened at state capitals before culminating in the major programme held in Sydney and Melbourne.

== French Polynesia ==
- FIFO (Festival International du Film Documentaire Océanien) in Tahiti

== New Zealand ==
Name	Est.	City	Type	Notes
48HOURS	2004	Auckland	Special interest	Annual competition in which a short film must be produced in 48 hours.
Big Mountain Short Film Festival	2006	Ohakune	Special interest	Annual short film festival. No longer running, discontinued from 2010.
New Zealand International Film Festivals	1970	Auckland, Wellington, Dunedin, Christchurch	International	Annual festival with a travelling programme in 10 additional cities.
