= List of ambassadors of Afghanistan to Australia =

Afghan Ambassadors to Australia

Official diplomatic relations between Afghanistan and Australia were established in 1969. Between 1975 and 1987, the Afghan ambassador to Japan was also accredited to Australia. After the creation of the Islamic Republic of Afghanistan after liberation from Taliban rule, Afghanistan has maintained a resident embassy in Canberra since 2002. The ambassador to Australia is also concurrently ambassador to both New Zealand and Fiji.

== Afghan Non-Resident Ambassadors to Australia ==
Name	Post	Date of Presentation of Credentials	
Name	Post	Year	Date
Mr. Ali Ahmad Popal	Non-Resident Ambassador	1975	1 May
Change of regime and Soviet invasion lowered the level of bilateral relationship with Japan between 1978 and 1987

== Afghan Resident Ambassadors and Heads of Mission to Australia ==
Name	Post	Date of Presentation of Credentials	
Name	Post	Year	Date
Mr. Mir Zamanuddin Musleh*	Honorary Consul/Consul	1993*	N/A
All honorary consular activities suspended when the Taliban captured Kabul in 1996
Mr. Mahmoud Saikal	Honorary Consul/Consul	1994	N/A
Mr. Mahmoud Saikal	Ambassador	2002	27 June
Mr. Mohammad Anwar Anwarzai	Ambassador	2005	24 November
Mr. Amanullah Jayhoon	Ambassador	2007	31 May
Dr. Nasir Ahmad Andisha	Ambassador	2011	25 August
Mr. Ghulam Abbas Farasoo	Charge d’affaires	2015	21 August
Mr. Wahidullah Waissi	Ambassador	2017	1 March
* This is the date of appointment for Mr. Musleh as Consul of Afghanistan in Australia by the Afghan Government. He never submitted his exequatur to the Government of Australia.

== See also ==
- List of Afghan Ambassadors to New Zealand
- List of Afghan Ambassadors to Fiji
- Embassy of Afghanistan, Canberra
