= Permanent Representative of Afghanistan to the United Nations =

Senior diplomat

- Incumbent; Naseer Faiq (chargé d'affaires) since 17 December 2021
- Style: His/Her Excellency
- Formation: 1949
- Website: www.afghanmission-un.org

The permanent representative of Afghanistan to the United Nations (Pashto: په ملګرو ملتونو کې د افغانستان د اسلامي جمهوريت دایمي استازی) is Afghanistan's foremost diplomatic representative to the United Nations. The permanent representative is the head of a diplomatic mission to the headquarters of the United Nations in New York City. The permanent representative of Afghanistan to the United Nations has headed the Permanent Mission of Afghanistan to the United Nations since Afghanistan became a UN Member State on 19 November 1946.

The current permanent representative of Afghanistan is Naseer Faiq. Faiq says he is not a representative of the Islamic Republic of Afghanistan or any other government, instead operating as an independent representative of Afghanistan.

== List of Afghan permanent representatives to the United Nations ==
This is a list of permanent representatives of Afghanistan to the United Nations.

Name	Portrait	Entered office	Left office	Notes
Mohammed Kabir Louddin		1949	1950	
Abdul Hamid Aziz		1950	16 April 1958	
Abdul Rahman Pazhwak		16 April 1958	25 July 1979	
Bismellah Sahak		25 July 1979	2 November 1981	
Farid Zarif		2 November 1981	23 January 1987	
Shah Mohammad Dost		23 January 1987	10 August 1989	
Noor Ahmed Noor		10 August 1989	25 June 1991	
Khodaidad Basharmal		25 June 1991	30 April 1993	
Ravan A.G. Farhadi		30 April 1993	18 December 2006	
Dr. Zahir Tanin		19 December 2006	5 October 2015	
Mahmoud Saikal		27 October 2015	31 December 2018	
Adela Raz		31 December 2018	1 June 2021	
Ghulam M. Isaczai		1 June 2021	15 December 2021	
Naseer Faiq		17 December 2021		chargé d'affaires

Note: Since December 2021, Afghanistan U.N. Mission diplomat Naseer Faiq has served as Afghanistan's chargé d’affaires to the UN. The Taliban's pick for UN Ambassador Suhail Shaheen remains unrecognized.

== See also ==
- Afghanistan and the United Nations
- List of current permanent representatives to the United Nations
- Foreign relations of Afghanistan
- Diplomatic missions of Afghanistan
