= Afghanistan and the United Nations =

Afghanistan

United Nations membership
- Represented by: Kingdom of Afghanistan (1946–1973); Republic of Afghanistan (1973–1978); Democratic Republic of Afghanistan (1978–1992); Islamic State of Afghanistan (1992–2002); Transitional Islamic State of Afghanistan (2002–2004); Islamic Republic of Afghanistan (2004–2021)
- Membership: Full member (voting rights suspended)
- Since: 19 November 1946
- UNSC seat: Non-permanent
- Permanent Representative: Naseer Faiq (chargé d'affaires)

Afghanistan officially joined the United Nations on 19 November 1946 as the Kingdom of Afghanistan. In June 1945, the month after war had ended in Europe, representatives from 50 countries came together and drew up the UN Charter, which was signed on 26 June 1945. The UN officially came into existence on 24 October 1945. As one of the UN's earliest members, Afghanistan has contributed to the work of the world body, including through its diverse and unique culture.

The fate of Afghan representation at the United Nations became contested when the Taliban took over the country in 2021. Permanent Representative Ghulam M. Isaczai remained in his post until resigning in December. After he resigned, deputy head of mission Mohammad Wali Naeemi would have succeeded him in an acting capacity. However, because Naeemi was ill, the delegation appointed Naseer Faiq, a very junior diplomat, to serve in the role until Naeemi could recover. When Naeemi did recover, the then-recognized foreign minister, Haneef Atmar, along with members of the Afghan UN delegation and Afghan diplomats at missions abroad, supported Naeemi stepping into the post. Atmar's letter supporting Naeemi's appointment prompted UN legal and political committees to assess his continued legitimacy. Those bodies concluded that the government the UN had recognized, the Islamic Republic of Afghanistan, had ceased to exist on 15 August 2021, and that this meant it was no longer official and none of its officials remained legitimate. After this determination, the UN removed Ashraf Ghani, who had been the president, from its heads of state list, as well as removing Atmar as the recognized foreign minister. They then overruled the wishes of Atmar and the other Afghan officials to allow Faiq to remain in his post indefinitely. Faiq now claims that he is not a representative of the Islamic Republic of Afghanistan and does not represent any other government. Faiq's voting rights in the General Assembly were suspended in 2024, with the UN citing nonpayment of dues, which would have come from the Afghan government, though Faiq claimed the decision was politically motivated and intended to silence him.

== See also ==
- Foreign relations of Afghanistan
- United Nations Assistance Mission in Afghanistan
- Permanent Mission of Afghanistan to the United Nations
