= Abdul Rahman Pazhwak =

Afghan poet and diplomat (1919–1995)

Abdur Rahman Pazhwak
- عبدالرحمن پژواک
- Born: 7 March 1919; Ghazni Province
- Died: 8 June 1995 (aged 76); Peshawar, Pakistan
- Resting place: Nangarhar, Afghanistan
- Citizenship: Afghanistan
- Occupations: Prominent Afghan diplomat and scholar
- Employer(s): United Nations, Government of Afghanistan
- Known for: Nationalism

Abdul Rahman Pazhwak (Persian: عبدالرحمن پژواک; 7 March 1919 – 8 June 1995) was an Afghan poet and diplomat. He was educated in Afghanistan and started his career as a journalist, later joining the foreign ministry. During the 1950s, he became ambassador to the United Nations and served as president of the UN General Assembly from 1966 to 1967. During the early 1970s, he served for short periods as Afghan ambassador to West Germany and India. In 1976, he became ambassador to the United Kingdom. He served in that position until the 1978 Saur Revolution. He then returned to Afghanistan and was put under house arrest. He was allowed to leave for medical treatment in 1982 and received asylum in the United States, where he lived until 1991, before moving to Peshawar, after Pakistan offered him sanctuary. Abdul Rahman Pazhwak died in Hayatabad in Peshawar on 8 June 1995. He was in Baghwani village off Surkh Road in Nangarhar Province, Afghanistan.

Ustad (an honorific title) Abdur Rahman Pazhwak (1919–1995) came from a Pashtun household that was attached to tradition but nonetheless gave Pazhwak enough freedom to allow him to develop into a 'free spirit' already as a young adult. He grew up to become not only a famous poet and writer but also a successful diplomat who was respected in the highest international circles.

== Early life ==
Abdur Rahman Pazhwak was born on 7 March 1919 in the historical city of Ghazni, south of Kabul, where his father, Qazi (Judge) Abdullah Khan served as the provincial judge. He spent his childhood years in a traditional family environment, living partly in his ancestral village of Baghbani, Nangarhar Province, and partly in the capital city of Kabul. The family moved from Ghazni to Kabul and from Kabul to Khogyani District of Nangarhar province in eastern Afghanistan near the family's ancestral village in Surkhrud district in accordance with his father's official appointments. Pazhwak's forefathers were descendants of a prominent Maroof Khel sub-tribe, tracing its roots to Ahmadzai tribes of the Ghilzai Confederation. Pazhwak grew up in a traditional region inhabited by Pashtuns, where generations of Pazhwak's family were renowned as landowners, educators and public servants. Pazhwak's father and his older brother, Judge Hafizullah Khan, were major contributors to the development of Pazhwak's character, upbringing and education. While Pazhwak's late father Judge Abdullah Khan served as the Chief Justice of Afghanistan's Supreme Court, Habibullah Kalakni and his followers took control of the capital city, Kabul in 1929. Kalakani rejected any kind of innovation, forced the reformist Amanullah Khan to abdicate, usurping the throne for himself. Pazhwak's father, Judge Abdullah, joined the resistance against the usurper and amidst anarchy and chaos, Pazhwak's progressive older brother, Judge Hafizullah, was murdered in Shamali, where he had been appointed as the judge, at the hands of unknown anarchists.

At the end of Habibullah Kalakani's interregnum, Pazhwak attended the Habibia High School, which was among the first famous modern schools in Afghanistan. The school trained a whole section of the country's open-minded educated elite in the twentieth century. Among Pazhwak's teachers in Kabul were two prominent poet-scholars: Sufi Abdulhaq Bitab (1887–1969) who taught at the Habibiya High School, and Ustad Khalilullah Khalili (1909–1985), who was Pazhwak's part-time private tutor. As a result, a lifelong friendship was forged between Pazhwak and his ten-years-senior teacher, Ustad Khalili. At this time, the poet laureate Bitab and the equally-learned poet and diplomat Khalili were widely and highly valued for their Dari literary prose. This was also the key reason explaining why Pazhwak, whose first language was Pashto, was able to stand out as a Dari writer whose work was testimony to the author's sensitivity to the subtleties of the Persian language. English was taught as a foreign language at the school and this in turn played a significant role in Pazhwak's subsequent career as a diplomat. His knowledge of English already came useful to him at a young age enabling him to read and translate into Dari the works of English language authors. Scattered pieces of Pazhwak's first poems and essays appeared in the Afghan press in the first half of the 1930s. At the time the young literati used various pen-names: first Wafa, then Marlaw, and finally Armanjan. It was only towards the end of the 1930s that the aspiring young literati permanently settled for the pen-name Pazhwak which means 'echo' in both Dari and Pashto.

After high school, Pazhwak was designated to study medicine but felt compelled to interrupt his studies due to lack of interest in the field and the loss of his father who was the bread-winner of the family. He decided to join the workforce, starting his career working as an English translator for the academic institution of the Kabul Literary Association, Anjuman-i Adabi-yi Kabul. Pazhwak subsequently made a career in Afghanistan's information and press sector taking on the challenges of producing serious press work of high standards. Meanwhile, Pazhwak and his colleagues coped with a series of intellectual restrictions that were triggered by state censorship.

Pazhwak was particularly impressed by his superior, Allama Salahuddin Saljuqi (1895/97-1970). A scholar, philosopher, diplomat and literati known for his active patronage of young talent Saljuqi was the President of the Press and Information Office. He had recognized and cherished Pazhwak's independence of thinking and his self-reliant and critical approach to all things which was very mature for his young age. In a private correspondence dating from the mid-1950s Saljuqi implodes Pazhwak "not to put aside the fearless writing that is pouring out of your pen!" Pazhwak was at the time the lead editor of the important newspaper Islah and then worked as the Director of the Afghan international news agency Bakhtar, before eventually occupying the post of the Director of the Pashto Academy, Pashtu Tulana. In 1943, Pazhwak became Director General of Publications, and took charge of the entire operational side of the Afghan press and information sector. Pazhwak resigned the post in the mid-1940s, most likely to express his firm opposition to the newly issued press law that restricted press and intellectual freedom.

== Political career ==
Pazhwak first entered the world of diplomacy at the age of twenty-seven. His initial job as a press attaché, but difference of opinion with the embassy's leadership, whose members all belonged to the ruling royal family, forced Pazhwak, who was a critical thinker, to find work outside of the Afghan government, landing a job with the International Labour Organization (ILO) in Montreal. The Afghan government soon reproached Pazhwak to join public service putting his political and literary skills at work at the Foreign Ministry in Kabul.

On 19 November 1946, the Kingdom of Afghanistan joined the United Nations as a full member. Pazhwak for the first time attended the meetings of the United Nations General Assembly in 1947 and henceforth he became a regular participant of such meetings. Starting off as an ordinary member of the Afghan delegation, in 1958 he rose up to become Afghanistan's Ambassador to the United Nations. He occupied this prestigious position until 1972 with tremendous success and acclaim. During this tenure at the United Nations, Pazhwak contributed significantly to achieving United Nations organizational goals. Simultaneously, Pazhwak hard work and passion left significant marks at various political and diplomatic levels of the UN. As a result, Pazhwak was elected as the President of the nineteenth United Nations Human Rights Commission in 1963 in Geneva. In 1966; he was elected as President of the United Nations' General Assembly in New York. In tandem, Pazhwak headed multiple committees and was significantly involved in the elevation of the principle of self-determination of nations and peoples to an internationally binding right enshrined in the Universal Declaration of Human Rights. As leader of various United Nations-led fact-finding and extraordinary missions he became familiar with important, politically delicate tasks and investigations. Pazhwak felt that the United Nations served as a conduit for realizing the world's best hope and sensed its significance in resolving conflict and injustice in the political processes on world stage. In 1968 Pazhwak was seen as having a solid chance to replace the hesitating U Thant – who spent a whole term dithering whether to run for another period – and occupy the high position of the UN Secretary General.

In the 1950s and '60s, when the international political scene was marked by the dualism of Western powers versus the Eastern Bloc, the movement of the Non-Aligned Movement states, emerged on the world stage as a third power. Afghanistan became one of the founding members of this movement. As his country's sole representative, Pazhwak regularly attended the movement's most important conferences from the early phase of its inception to its official founding to the period in which the movement became fully established. Known as a serious advocate of non-alignment, Pazhwak is counted among the non-alignment movement's veterans.

In the 1950s and 60s, when Pazhwak himself lived in faraway places abroad working in the United States and in Switzerland, some of his important works were published in Kabul. The key collection of stories, Afsanaha-yi Mardum (Stories of the People), appeared in 1957. Two poetry collections crafted in the neo-classical style, Chand Shi'r az Pazhwak ('Selection of Pazhwak's Poems') and Gulha-yi Andisha (Thought Flowers) were published some years later, in 1963 and in 1965 respectively. Many of Pazhwak's writings are in Dari and were first printed only two decades later as part of a new wave of publication.

In the decade of relative democratization between 1963 and 1973, internal political changes took place in Kabul including the nomination for the first time of a non-royal prime minister. The Constitution of 1964 revealed traits of a Western-style parliamentary system, promising democratic freedoms including free elections, a free parliament, freedom of opinion and freedom to set-up political parties. Those who took advantage of the very slowly-developing democratization were leftist factions and groups. On the streets of Kabul, it came to violent clashes particularly between leftist students and a small group of Islamists who had their own student followers. The government tried to take tough action against both sides.

Afghan government leaders at the time preferred to see Pazhwak assigned abroad because of his brilliance and were quite reluctant to see him in Kabul because of his political independence and alternative perspective on Afghan domestic politics. While Pazhwak thrived on the international scene, he could only watch the turbulent years of democratization from a distance in New York in 1960s. Some of the poems that he crafted at the time were in the new style (sabk-i jadid) and dealt with social and hence critical themes. Pazhwak was eager to contribute to Afghanistan's future, but his principled stands and strong-willed personality were not palatable for either for the Afghan officials or the powers behind the throne. Pazhwak was kept outside of Afghanistan most of the time and never given the opportunity to actively play a role in shaping internal political conditions.

Pazhwak's liberal and progressive mindset, his advocacy for freedom of opinion, his support for active political participation of citizens, and his championing of human rights had fallen on fertile grounds particularly among intelligentsia. It became apparent that Pazhwak's views represented danger to the ruling establishment. While the new Afghan constitution was being prepared in 1963, Pazhwak (at the time serving as the president of the United Nations' Human Rights Commission in Geneva) was asked by King Zahir Shah to return to Kabul to share his views regarding the constitution. Later on, however, Pazhwak learned with disappointment from an insider that his written thoughts submitted for consideration did not even reach the committee set up to discuss the articles of the new constitution. In 1973, when Daoud Khan came to power through a bloodless coup d'état, which had considerable support among the leftist and pro-Moscow elements of the Afghan army, he relied on Pazhwak as a special envoy to promote Afghanistan's national security interests in major international forums. Once again, Pazhwak was denied a leadership role in domestic Afghan affairs during the republican era of 1973 to 1978. The new republican constitution ratified established a one-party system despite Pazhwak's best hopes. Pazhwak was kept outside of the country, spending the 1970s far away from Afghanistan taking charge of the Afghan embassies in Bonn, Delhi and London.

== Life after resigning ==
On 27 April 1978, a bloody coup took place, carried out by pro-Moscow military officers and members of the People's Democratic Party of Afghanistan (PDPA). The coup undermined Afghanistan's sovereignty and independence, allowing Kremlin to exercise influence in Afghanistan directly. Upon learning the nature of the coup in Kabul, Pazhwak resigned his post as Afghanistan's ambassador to London and voluntarily returned home where he was put under house arrest. Ordered by the new communist power holders, Nur Muhammad Taraki and Hafizullah Amin's purging campaigns were launched, turning into waves of terror throughout the country. Numerous Afghans, who had no relationship with the DPPA, lost their lives. Towards the end of 1979, Amin, who had murdered Taraki, was deposed by the Soviets, installing Babrak Karmal as the new ruler. Pazhwak expressed his thoughts about the Soviet troop's invasion in a poem called The Red Army.

For Pazhwak it was evident that profound resentment was spreading among a broad spectrum of the population, triggered by the Democratic Republic of Afghanistan's violent dictatorship and the occupation of Afghanistan by the Red Army. He witnessed with his own eyes the protest demonstrations of male and female high school students. Deeply moved by the violent death on 9 April 1980 of Naheed Sahed, who was a student in her final year of high school, Pazhwak later crafted a volume of poetry dedicated to "The martyr Nahid Sa'id, her sisters, and all those Afghan women who have stood up against the Red Army, inside or outside of the homeland.".

Pazhwak, who from the beginning had distanced himself from the communists, first joined the resistance secretly, through writing shab-nama political pamphlets distributed at nights, and later in exile where he started an open resistance against the communist rulers and the Soviet army's occupation of both of which acted against the principles of nations' rights. The long years of exile, which Pazhwak spent were repeatedly affected by health-related setbacks. Faraway from his homeland, Pazhwak's thoughts and feelings were about the present conditions and the future state of affairs of in his eyes; his imprisoned country and its inhabitants. He processed his pain and grief through literary activity. Even in his resistance Pazhwak did not join any political leader, party, or ideology and knew well how to avoid being monopolized for propaganda purposes. He formulated his goal for his homeland in the following manner: "For me the goal of this sacred jihad is total independence; freedom; human rights; and the inviolability of Afghanistan from the ruling or the threat of being ruled by foreign aggressors; the removal of communism, the strengthening of Islam and social justice; and the establishment of Afghanistan's self-determination in line with the wishes of the country's Muslim population."

Pazhwak's farsighted concept for, which he presented to the United Nations, provided for bringing together all the relevant Afghan groups, factions, parties and figures, conspiring to make them walk along a common path and gather together at the table of negotiation. Against this idea stood the lack of unity among Afghans which was in part directed by outside forces and in part a result of already existing internal disunity. Foreign interference, in particular the dubious role of Pakistan in questions of Afghanistan, as well as the absence of representatives of the Afghan resistance movement during the Geneva Accords (1988) were criticized by Pazhwak as the decisive flaws in attempting to create lasting peace in Afghanistan.

== Last years and death ==
The final years of exile which Pazhwak spent in were particularly painful and disappointing. Following the withdrawal of the last contingent of the once 100,000 men strong red army soldiers on 15 February 1989, the Afghan's struggle for freedom turned into a civil war which in turn required a heavy blood price. Pazhwak's long-lasting illness turned out to be cancer. He died in the morning of 8 June 1995, in the city of Peshawar, only a few months after his wife's death. His body was taken back to his beloved homeland where he found eternal peace buried in his ancestral village of Baghbani, Surkhrod district of Nangrahar province.

== Personal life ==
He is the uncle of Niamatullah Pazhwak, an Afghan politician who served as Ministry of Education under the government of Daoud Khan. Abdul Rahman's granddaughter is Afghan poet, Parween Pazhwak.

== Works of literature: poetry and prose ==
=== Poetry ===
Pazhwak's literary activity stretched over a period of more than six decades. Most of his work was composed in Dari while another, by comparison, smaller number of texts were in Pashto. In this manner, Pazhwak made use of both cultural and national languages of, his vocabulary and command of the rules of both languages being in equal measure masterly. Some of his works, a few non-literary texts, were also crafted in English. Pazhwak's literary oeuvre is composed of poems on the one hand and prose on the other. The division in the categories of prose and poetry only in a limited manner sums up the stylistic diversity and plurality of genre that is evidenced in Pazhwak's work. This point will become clear in the following section.

Pazhwak's poetic works are simultaneously testimony to his considerable literary flexibility and his masterly command of the rules of both classical and modern poetry. A large part of poems penned by Pazhwak were crafted in the neo-classical style (sabk-i klasik-i mu'abbar ) including the poems that appear in the collections Cand Shi'r az Pazhwak (1963), Gulha-yi Andisha (1965) and Banu-yi ('The Lady of Balkh', 2001). Pazhwak was a qualified connoisseur of the classical literature of his cultural realm. In his neo-classical poetry, he draws on a source of regularly-appearing poetic imagery and motifs, at times adding new ones to them. The reader encounters general themes and motifs concerning humanity for example faith and grief or love, hope and joy. Many of the poems carry traits of classical Persian poetry. In such poems, Pazhwak on the one hand makes use of current formal schemata of classical Persian poetry such as ghazal, qasida, masnawi, ruba'i and du-bayti. ' Abdul Ghafur Rawan Farhadi, a connoisseur of Afghan poetry and of Pazhwak's poetry in particular, makes the following comparison: "Pazhwak's ghazals bring to mind memories of Rudaki, Sa'di, the divan of Shams, Hafez and Sa'ib and his qasida and masnavi resemble those of Farrokh, Mawlana Balkhi and Iqbal Lahori."[10] These are the names of distinguished poets of classical Persian poetry, with Iqbal being the only poet to have lived later, having died in 1938. Their works have functioned as an endless fountain of inspiration for generations of poets who emerged later. For example, Pazhwak wrote the following verse:

Stand up inn keeper and fill the cup with wine,

It is said that spring has arrived, how much longer will you remain asleep?[11]

In writing this, he was making use of important ingredients of classical, eastern, Islamic poetry – for example wine (badah/mai/sharab), love ('ishq), inn keeper (saqi) and beloved (dust/mahbub) – which were already known since the time of Hafiz (d. 1389). Do the above-mentioned motifs in Pazhwak's poetry stand for the sweet joys of earthy life? Or is there a deeper, mystical meaning behind the motifs? Should they be understood the way we interpret Omar Khayyam, who, for example, uses the image of wine to depict independent thinking and free reasoning? [12] In Pazhwak's case it does not make sense to interpret the motifs as reflections of a libertine. They are rather the expressions of a joyful affirmation of existence and delight in living. These poems belong to the first phase of Pazhwak's literature which Puiya Fariyabi describes as "the phase of passionate love and friendship", dawra-yi shur-i 'ishq wa nishat.[13]

On the other hand, Pazhwak also followed his own distinct poetic path as Farhadi stresses in the same paragraph: "But the Dari poetry of Pazhwak is more than anything the result of his own, natural talent for poetry."[14] We can be more precise about this aspect: Pazhwak was himself creative in the content he chose for his poetry and he acted freely and also filled the known formats of classical poetry with new, contemporary and sometimes critical themes and content which in large part drew on his homeland and culture.

Crafted in the neo-classical style, in Pazhwak's poetry we also encounter moments of classical adaptation (form) and at the same time moments of innovation (contemporary themes and content). For example, Pazhwak was an independent thinker and literati, capable of critical reflection about his homeland and the internal political circumstances there. This central aspect appears regularly in his literary work in a subtle and aesthetic manner. He obviously used the politically charged theme of freedom – in the sense of political freedom and the political rights of citizens – in relationship with the conditions in Afghanistan. Trenchantly and elegantly he expressed his worrying thoughts:

Today I am reminded of that land,

Where the people are prisoners, but the country is free.[15]

The format in which these verses appear is traditional. But the content, by contrast, is linked to the happenings of the time. The key characteristic is the antithesis of the second part of the half-verse where the adjectives free and imprisoned are juxtaposed. In the poem Pazhwak writes about the theme of political conditions inside. The declaration in the content can be paraphrased as follows: even though has been freed from foreign (i.e. British) rule by the Third Anglo-Afghan War of 1919, the lack of freedom of thinking keeps its people still imprisoned. At the time, the West also took a vivid interest in the Afghans' resistance against the Soviet occupation. William Pitt Root expressed his sympathy for Afghans' resistance in his poetry collection, The Unbroken Diamond: Night letter to the Mujahidin. Pazhwak translated the collection into Dari and crafted a poem in response to Pitt Root's collection en entitled Almas-i Nashikan, which was published from exile in 1996.

It was only during this latter period when Pazhwak was living in exile, mid-1980s to early 1990s, when new collections of his poetry were published. Hadis-i Khun (1985), Maihan-i Man (1989), Banu-yi Balkh (2001), Nahid Nama (posthumous, 1995) and Almas-i Nashikan (posthumous, 1996) were all examples of his poetry collections published abroad. Such newer works, Nahid-Nama and Almas-i Nashikan significantly differed from Pazhwak's older poetry such as Chand Shi'r az Pazhwak and Gulha-yi Andisha. The poet in exile had clearly distanced himself from literary traditionalism and taken a new direction, both in content and form. Although Pazhwak had already written some poems in which he disregarded the conventions that shaped classical Persian poetry, for example metric and rhyming rules, it was only in the early 1980s that he fully crossed the frontiers of classical format. Here he made use of the modern style and the progressive style Shi'r-i Naw ('New Poetry'), Shi'r-i Azad ('Free Verse'). Such very young poetry movements since the 1940s have been gradually developing in the whole of the Muslim world and had eventually reached because of modern developments in the West and under considerable Western influence.

The obvious change of literary paradigms in the later phase of Pazhwak's poetry was linked to historical events that were taking place in Afghanistan. Nahid-Nama and Almas-i Nashikan are responses to the events that took place in Afghanistan after 1978. The themes of both collections are the occupation by the Red Army and the Afghan jihad against the occupiers. These works are interesting for their outward format and their content. In other words, they are interesting for the way the themes have been processed in them. While Pazhwak drew on a variety of themes from the events of 1978, his poetry was not a broad facet of themes. Instead, only one theme emerged strongly: the sad fate of, the traumatic events and experiences that were in part lived by the poet himself and in part belonged to the collective experience of the country's people. The theme of the brutal war waged by the occupying forces against the Afghans is not suited to be tackled through the formats of classical poetry. In his free handling of the peculiarity of format and language, Pazhwak made use of modern poetry. His work Almas-i Nashikan, for example, is a poetic rendition of what is a collection of facts in which the total brutality of events is depicted in a manner making minimal use of the classical style of poetry. For example, Pazhwak talks in the poem about chemical weapons used by the Red Army or the troops of the Communist regime opening fire on young male and female Afghan students who marched on the streets of Kabul in protest. By comparison to Pazhwak's neo-classical poetry, his modern poems make up only a small part of his total work. But these poems crafted in exile nonetheless open a new chapter in the history of contemporary Afghan poetry. [16]

=== Prose ===
Pazhwak's prose writing is equally diverse and can be divided into the following categories: first, factual writing (non-fiction texts) and second, esthetic writing (or fictional texts). The factual non-fiction works produced by Pazhwak include a small series of general introductory works about Afghanistan and the issue of "Pashtunistan" such as "Afghanistan: Ancient Aryana and "The Question of Pashtunistan." These booklets were published by the Afghan Information Bureau, the media wing of the Afghan Embassy in London, 1950s. The texts are in English and their purpose is to serve Western readers as sources of information about the two mentioned themes. A research text written by Pazhwak about Pashtunwali (the ancient code of conduct prevalent among Pashtuns until today) and some journalistic writings date to the period of the late 1930s and 1940s. Finally, we need to mention Pazhwak's reflections on the political situation in Afghanistan under the Soviet occupation which is contained in the work Muzakirat-i Janiv ('Geneva Talks') which appeared in Afghanistan at the end of the 1980s.

Pazhwak was an outstanding writer of prose. Some of his prose narratives have been published, such as the stories included in the key volume of his work, Afsanaha-yi Mardum (, 1958), while other examples of his prose writing are still unpublished. A collection of Pazhwak's two short stories _ "Wanderer" and "A Woman" were published in Kabul in 2006. The booklet titled "A Woman" also offers the English translation of these short stories.[17] Included in Pazhwak's body of fiction writing are some dramas but most of the texts belong to the genre of storytelling including short stories and novelettes. The drams, short stories (dastan-i kuta) and novelettes (nawil) stem from Western literature but are nowadays an established part of modern Afghan prose writing (nasr-i adabi). The beginnings of this genre of literature in can be traced back to the early twentieth century when important literary impulses came from the journalistic and literary efforts of Mahmud Tarzi (1865–1933). Tarzi's regular elaborations in his influential newspaper Seraj al-Akhbar on Western literature and its various genres and movements were not only noticed by Afghan literati but also greatly influenced their work. In this manner, the new forms of prose writing gradually entered the literature of . Pazhwak's turning away from traditional style of prose writing, for example, his limited use of the picturesque metaphorical prose of the East and his turning to increasingly more realistic style of writing are in tune with what Tarzi defined as the important criteria for modern prose writing. In some of the stories, Pazhwak attends to the protagonist's deep thoughts, placing the human being and his inner life at the center of the narrative. Pazhwak was one of the first Afghan literati to write drama, short stories and novelettes. In recognition of his standing and contribution, Sayed Haschmatullah Hossaini described Pazhwak as a "pioneer of Afghan short story writing," in his research on modern Dari literature in Afghanistan.[18]

Many of Pazhwak's prose writings drew on the rich repertoire of Afghan folklore, revealing Pazhwak's preference for this genre. The austere landscape of often serves as the main backdrop in Pazhwak's stories while Iranian and Indian regions also occasionally appear as secondary backdrops. This latter aspect makes sense given that historically the borders between these countries have been shifting and fluid. Pazhwak's prose writing is almost entirely made up of short pieces in which the plot, often triggered by an unusual incident, follows an increasingly steep line of development. It is typical of the stories that romantic features are quite often added to them. The stories' repertoire of themes includes historical, folkloric, socially-critical and sometimes psychological and philosophical matters. A series of motifs, for example the bravery of Afghans, love for the homeland, the pathos of the Pashtuns, or the love between two young people from different social backgrounds run through the stories. Most of Pazhwak's prose in Pashto language remains unpublished, including half a dozen short stories and dramas.

Pazhwak also translated foreign literature into Dari. He translated, frequently from English poetry, factual texts and fiction some of which were published in Afghanistan while others remain unpublished. Pazhwak translated the Psalms of King David (from Urdu) and the works of Khalil Gibran, Rabindranath Tagore, Lord Byron, John Keats, Henry Wadsworth Longfellow, Reynold A. Nicholson, William Pitt Root and Jacques Prévert (from French). Additionally, Pazhwak translated selected poems and fragments from the works of Johann Wolfgang von Goethe, William Shakespeare, George Bernard Shaw and Victor Hugo. Among the translations that were published were Pishwa ('The Prophet') by Khalil Gibran and Baghban ('The Gardener') by the Indian author and winner of the Nobel Prize for literature, Rabindranath Tagore.

=== Themes, motifs and strategies ===
Pazhwak spent more than half of his life abroad, far away from his homeland in Europe, and . Nonetheless, or perhaps because of this, his love for his country and his patriotic intellectual and emotional connectedness to are always present in his work. His poetry and prose writing allow an authentic insight into certain problem sets that afflict society in Afghanistan. Often Pazhwak's experience of Western democracies was directly processed in his literary creativity. He interprets through literary works, whereby his interpretation is always based on a critical stance, carrying a clearly outlined implicit message. But it is up to the reader to extract the message from the respective texts. The implicit criticism which Pazhwak has expressed in his prose and poetry was in its time a path that promised success, allowing him, as a citizen without political power, to contribute to social, political and intellectual development of the Afghan society.

Afghan society is mostly conservative and steeped in traditional norms, structures, and ways of thinking. The futility of trying to introduce changes to traditions that would affect the fabric of society was revealed in the failure of King Amanullah's reforms in the 1920s. King Amanullah intended to reshape his country, introducing it to modernity through political and social changes that followed the example of Mustafa Kemal Atatürk's Republic of Turkey. His modernization measures for Afghan society, for example the removal of the hijab, the introduction of Western clothes, compulsory education for girls, and so forth were met with fierce resistance by a great section of the conservative rural and urban clerical establishment. As to citizens' participation in government matters, this has been nearly impossible for decades. The Constitution of 1923 (and the one of 1931) had contemporary and progressive traits that introduced Afghanistan to modern constitutionalism. But in actual terms governance remained authoritarian. A majority of what were stipulated as constitutional rights turned out to be pure theory. Hence, we can say that Afghanistan in the twentieth century was, in fact, an absolute rather than a constitutional monarchy. The country was not a police state, but the central operations of the government were running by a series of authoritarian figures including Prime Minister Hashim Khan (1929–1946), Shah Mahmud Khan (1946–1953) and Muhammad Da'ud Khan (1951–1963). Except for the years between 1963 and 1973 during which the prime minister was a common citizen all the figures came from the royal family. They had made achievements in certain fields, for example they firmly stuck to Afghanistan's political neutrality during the Second World War and worked on modernizing with the help of foreign development aide. But under the rule of such powerful prime ministers the political participation of citizens was hardly possible despite the existence of a bicameral parliament. The final decisions were always made by the power-holders.

Discontent with and criticism of the inadequacies that affected social and political life hardly featured in the official contemporary sources of the time. But they appear and are published decades later in other sources for example the personal memoirs of important political figures of . Equally, the Afghan press, which was relatively diverse for a third world country, had to struggle against mild to serious forms of censorship. In 1952, for example, the country banned all privately owned newspapers. As already mentioned, Pazhwak, who in the 1940s held a high position in the press, resigned in protest the above-mentioned press law.

Despite, or perhaps because of, such difficulties Pazhwak wanted to play a role in further developing the Afghan society. He had to express his criticism in such a manner that would allow for an efficient communication of criticism but without triggering existential problems for him. The themes related to Afghanistan which he openly or subtly dealt with in his texts included social conditions, the citizens' right of freedom, the peaceful handling of a probable threat to from outside, the damage to and weakening of traditional nomadic lifestyles through sedentary life and the anachronistic seeming aspects of the Pashtunwali code. The very literary and critical preoccupation with some of these themes themselves already amounted to crossing the threshold of power-holders' tolerance. That is why Pazhwak was particularly keen to include criticism in an implicit manner in his texts but in a style that would not make his texts lose their sharpness. This goal he achieved through a specific textual strategy which will be explained in the following example. In some of his texts, Pazhwak uses the contrast strategy by juxtaposing two opposite poles. Meanwhile, one pole would be occupied by a negative Afghan example and the other one by a positive example which inevitably would have the effect of making the opposite pole appear in a negative light. Using this strategy there is no need for the author to explicitly identify the Afghan pole as that one that represents negativity. For example, the theme of his unpublished texts is freedom and rain.[19] In this text, the more and resemble each other topographically the more different they are in terms of their internal political conditions. Indeed, freedom and rain are both of crucial importance to . Pazhwak connects freedom and rain to, both of which appear in the text as something he can only yearningly wish for in Afghanistan.

Pazhwak brought this message closer to his readers in the following manner: the conditions in Afghanistan are depicted as altogether positive with resembling paradise. The basis for this is the blossoming of freedom and regular rainfall. With this exaggerated, idealistic portrayal of Switzerland and its citizens Pazhwak implies that Afghanistan is far from reaching such heavenly conditions despite its purely superficial topographic commonalities with Switzerland. Remarkably Pazhwak manages to clearly demand freedom for his country's people but without resorting to using clichés or revolutionary vocabulary. Hence, he uses the term 'wish' instead of 'demand'. Even so, the message is made clear to readers. Pazhwak's gentle imagery and juxtapositions used in the text are almost pedagogic in the way they make readers become aware of the message implied. To this end, Pazhwak makes use of a poetic device whereby the linking of freedom with rain is central. The metaphor of rain refers not only to the purely physical aspect of the land but also, in a metaphorical sense, to the blossoming of freedom and spirit.

The unpublished text Padshir ('*') firstly evokes the well-known image of the Spin Ghar mountains in the east of Afghanistan, portraying the mountains as an idyllic landscape – in one part of the text Pazhwak even uses the term paradise for the scenery. In another part of the narrative the story is suddenly interrupted by a description of utter misery. Hence, we read, "In this place human life has just emerged from a distant past and there is no sign, not even a trace, of contemporary human beings. The people of Padshir sow corn between the rocks."[20] Again Pazhwak makes use of contrast as a literary device. After doing his utmost to evoke in readers' minds the image of a pleasant and magical landscape, his readers suddenly find themselves awoken to a different reality as if splashed with cold water. The realization of this literary maneuver takes place over several sections of the text. The text gains its sharpness only when the pleasant imagery is contrasted with a stark description of misery.

Another favorite strategy of Pazhwak's is the merciless dissection of crisis situations through which he evokes specific characteristics of conditions in Afghanistan. Here, the author adopts the perspective of a cold, emotionless eyewitness unaffectedly reporting and describing a horrific situation complete with gory details. Using this device alone, the author manages to invoke in readers a feeling of repugnance against the conditions that have triggered the situation described. Again, Pazhwak himself does not need to openly appear as a critic. Similarly, in his social critical novelette Dhamir ('*'), Pazhwak demonstrates through a ruthless portrayal of the story's protagonist that decadence and a lack of a sense of justice on the part of members of the Afghan feudal system are both immoral and un-Islamic. He does not specifically point the finger of accusation at the perpetrator or depict a caricature or inhuman picture of the protagonist. Instead, the protagonist comes across as a nice and ordinary person. But the protagonist's scandalous treatment of those socially vulnerable, which manifests itself with increasingly clarity, comes across as evidently immoral and religiously beyond justification. The initial possibility of readers' identification with the protagonist is reduced in the course of the narrative and ultimately disappears through gradual but relentless unmasking of the protagonist by the protagonist itself.

A particularly conspicuous character trait of Afghans is the immediate emergence of strife whenever there is a threat from the outside. Pazhwak tackles this theme in his famous poem Mardan-i Parupamizad ('*'), which he had crafted in the early 1940s. The poem in which Pazhwak makes use of the artful, poetic language of the classical masnawi form, still feels fresh and accessible even though the conditions of its reception have changed. Superficially speaking the poem is about Afghan patriotism. But in reality, through the poem Pazhwak wants to make readers realize the different consequences that unity, and its opposite, divisiveness, will have in the case of a foreign threat to . The history of since classical antiquity has been indeed marked by invasions by foreign armies and judging by historical evidence the Afghans' resistance has been fierce and frequently successful. However, unity has always been fragile even in times of war. A recent example of this is the resistance that took place in the decade of the Soviet occupation. Clear parallels to this recent example can be found in Afghans' struggle against the invading army of Alexander the Great in fourth century B.C. Both invaders had not anticipated the scale of their losses and the amount of time they would spend in Afghanistan. Both had failed to consider the inhabitants' strong desire for freedom and independence.

In the poem Mardan-i Parupamizad, there first appears a description of the time that Alexander the Great spent in Ariana (the historical name of and parts of ) and the experiences he had with the people of the country. Alexander, who was only used to victory, saw the occupation of Afghanistan as the necessary step for the conquest of India. His prolonged stay and campaign in Afghanistan began to cause anxiety among his Greek followers and subordinates. His mother, wrote him a letter, pleading with him to explain to her what had caused the delay – even the famous Aristotle had failed to offer an explanation. In response, Alexander sends Afghan tribal leaders to in order to illustrate what kind of problems he faced in Afghanistan. As ordered by her son, receives the Afghan princes with much respect. But Alexander had also requested that during the princes' audience with a small amount of soil from the Afghan homeland should be secretly placed under the carpets at the palace entrance. The Afghan princes arrived at the audience and inhaled the smell of the Afghan soil and immediately began displaying the behavior that was typical for Afghans: disunity and strife appeared among the princes and a passionate and bloody struggle was the result. In this manner, Alexander shows his mother that as soon as they somehow find themselves in proximity of the soil of their country patriotically minded Afghans immediately display bravery and passion. But these characteristics are also often used against their own people, causing harm to Afghans themselves. Towards the end the poem, Pazhwak points out that not only Alexander but many other rulers and people that came to Afghanistan experienced the Afghans' strengths and vulnerability. This conflicting nature of Afghan mindset is portrayed as a challenge that illustrates the fierce patriotism of Afghans as well as the cause of their downfall. The patriotism of Afghans is best illustrated in the imagery that Pazhwak uses in the following verse:

Even thousands of wine-filled barrels fail to intoxicate the patriot,

The way a tiny particle of homeland's dust does.[21]

In this verse, Pazhwak created an original way of comparing intoxication (or perhaps madness) with something else – in this case a tiny dust particle which can fully intoxicate the patriot. Thousands of barrels are a huge amount, a tiny particle, by contrast, is very small. The imagery of the dust particle that has the effect of clouding the mind, an effect that even a thousand barrels of wine cannot achieve in a wine lover, leaves no room for readers but to take in the extraordinary place that the homeland occupies among patriotic Afghans. The lines above are the poem's key verses and have been frequently quoted. Furthermore, the passage needs to be regarded in the context of the following verses where, in the second half verse, we read:

Blind are the eyes which look at the path of hope for the homeland.[22]

In this verse Pazhwak explicitly criticizes the people of his homeland, warning them that blindness creates disunity, leading to hatred and the killing of each other. The poem can be described as an epic about heroism but with a didactic backdrop. It is remarkable that Pazhwak does not communicate the message contained in the poem by using nationalist or chauvinist clichés. The poem's intention is ultimately to convey that if united and if they don't allow themselves to become prisoners of their own patriotism, Afghans can handle any foreign aggressor.

== Popular culture ==
Abdul Rahman Pazhwak makes a short guest appearance in the historical thriller, Eteka: Rise of the Imamba in the "Bandung" chapter.

Diplomatic posts
| Preceded by Amintore Fanfani | President of the United Nations General Assembly; 1966–1967 | Succeeded by Corneliu Mănescu |
