= St. Francis' High School (Hayatabad, Peshawar) =

St. Francis' High School is a Pre-Prep to Class 10 school located in Hayatabad, a suburb of Peshawar. The school was founded by Brother Francis Sales Fernando in the year 1993. The school has four house sections. Student leadership positions include Chief Prefect, Academic Officer, Class Leader, Treasurer, and Linguistics Officer. Annual events include Academics' Day (September), Sports Meet (December), Exhibition (February), and Class Party (April).
