= Iqra National University =

Private university in Peshawar, KPK, Pakistan

- Former name: Iqra University
- Motto: The University's core values stem from the holy word of IQRA: -Ibhath Undertake life-long Research -Qiyam Uphold ethical, social and educational values -Riyada Create responsible and creative leadership -At-tawasul Ensure effective communication and reach-out to others
- Type: Private
- Established: 2000
- Affiliations: PEC, HEC
- Chancellor: Obaid Ur Rehman
- Vice-Chancellor: Dr. Malik Taimur Ali
- Registrar: Dr. Engr. Mohsin Tahir
- Students: 5000+
- Location: Peshawar, Khyber Pakhtunkhwa, Pakistan
- Acronym: INU
- Mascot: Otaku
- Website: www.inu.edu.pk

Iqra National University (INU) (Urdu: اقراء نیشنل یونیورسٹی; Pashto: اقرا ملي پوهنتون), is a private university in Peshawar, KPK, Pakistan.

It is chartered by the Government of Khyber Pakhtunkhwa and is recognized by HEC (Higher Education Commission) and Pakistan Engineering Council. It offers a range of undergraduate and postgraduate programs as well as PhD programs in Management Sciences, Computer Sciences, Engineering, Education, Media Sciences, and Fashion Designing.

== History ==
It was the Peshawar Campus of Iqra University (until 2010).

The university started its independent academic setup under the provisional charter granted by Ordinance “Iqra National University Ordinance 2010” vide “Khyber Pakhtunkhwa Ordinance No. VII of 2010” on November 25, 2010, that is published in the Government Gazette as an “Act of the Provincial Legislature of the Khyber Pakhtunkhwa” on April 23, 2011.

Although, it is a newly chartered university, the name “Iqra” is not new in education since the management, the faculty and the infrastructure has served the nation at Peshawar for the last one decade, when it emerged as a campus of Iqra University Karachi chartered by the Government of Sindh in 2000 at University Town in a rented premises.

== Location ==
The Iqra National University has its campus at the heart of phase-II, Hayatabad Peshawar. The university is adjacent to Bagh-e-Naran, a recreational park popular since the establishment of the Hayatabad Township, and Hayatabad Sports Complex.

== Admission ==
Admissions to all programs and constituent / affiliated units are granted on the basis of merit as determined through the INU Admission Test or ETEA / SAT / GMAT / GRE / GAT scores and the students' records.

== Schools ==
=== School of Civil Engineering ===
#	Degree	Duration	Cr. Hrs
1	BE-Civil	4 Year	136
2	B-Tech	4 Year	133
3	MS-Civil	2 Year	30
4	Ph.D-Civil	Minimum 3 Year	136
5	MS (Master in Science of Art & Design)	2 Year	136

=== School of Electrical Engineering ===
#	Degree	Duration	Cr. Hrs
1	BE-Electrical	4 Year	133
2	B-Tech (Electrical)	4 Year	135
3	B-Tech (Electronics)	4 Year	135
4	MS Electrical Engineering	2 Year	
4	MS Engineering Management	2 Year	
5	Ph.D Electrical Engineering	Minimum 3 Year	
6	Ph.D Engineering Management	Minimum 3 Year	136

=== School of Computer Science ===
#	Degree	Duration	Cr. Hrs
1	BS (Computer Science)	4 Year	130
2	BS (Tele Communication)	4 Year	130
3	BS (Software Engineering)	4 Year	130
4	MS (Software Engineering)	2 Year	30
5	MS (Computer Science)	2 Year	30
6	Ph.D (Computer Science)	2 Year	30

=== School of Business Administration ===
#	Degree	Duration	Cr. Hrs
1	BBA (Bachelor in Business Administration)	4 Year	129
2	MBA (Master in Business Administration)	1.5 Year	36
3	MBA (Master in Business Administration)	3.5 Year	90
4	MS (Management Sciences)	2 Year	36
5	Ph.D (Management Sciences)	Min 3 Year	48

=== School of Art & Design ===
#	Degree	Duration	Cr. Hrs
1	BFD (Bachelor in Fashion Design)	4 Year	136
2	BTD (Bachelor in Textile Design)	4 Year	136
3	BID (Bachelor in Interior Design)	4 Year	136
4	MS (Master in Science of Art & Design)	2 Year	136

=== School of Allied Health Sciences ===
#	Degree	Duration	Cr. Hrs
1	DPT (Doctor of Physical Therapy)	5 Year	165
2	BSMLT (Bachelors of Science in Medical Lab Technology)	4 Year	134
3	BSDT (Bachelors of Science in Dental Technology)	4 Year	128
4	BSRT (Bachelors of Science in Radiology Technology)	4 Year	134
5	BSMB (Bachelors of Science in microbiology)	4 Year	135

== Labs and Facilities ==
=== Student Information Center (SIC) ===
The university has designed an official mascot named ‘Otaku’ which acts like a guide for students. Through pictorial descriptions, Otaku helps explain university guidelines, events, updates and information related to the SIC (student information center). I-WIZ, an intelligent system (automated teller machine), designed to cater to the needs of currently enrolled students. Installed at university's lobby, it has made academic information readily accessible and only a click away. It provides easy access to the time table, results, incomplete transcript, examination slip and fee bills.

=== Computer Resource Center ===
The computer network at Iqra University comprises more than 50 nodes providing multiple computing environments running latest software on contemporary servers. Available research facilities are Artificial Intelligence, Robotics, and digital signal processing.

=== Laboratories ===
The university has computer networks labs, power/industrial electronics lab, communications lab, electrical machines/EMI lab, DCL/embedded system labs, instrumentation & testing center, engineering mechanics lab, engineering drawing lab, engineering mechanics lab, survey lab, sewing lab, draping lab, drawing lab, computer lab, textile printing lab, weaving lab and control lab.

The facilities available are second to none and supplement lectures by extensive practical work.

=== Study visits ===
Visits to industrial sites and organizations are arranged so that students can gather practical knowledge about national and multinational organizations and industries. This helps them to get better jobs.

=== Recreational programs ===
Along with academic activities, cultural, recreational and instructive programs are arranged for students. These include cultural programs, picnics, study tours, debate and indoor & outdoor games.

=== Library ===
The campus maintains about 6,000 relevant books pertaining to Electrical/Electronics Engineering, Computer Sciences, Finance, Human Resource, Marketing, Accounting, Economics, Quantitative Techniques, Research Methodologies, Business Communication etc.

The Information Resource Center (IRC) offers more than a traditional library. Information resources accessible through the IRC include books, journals, magazines, newspapers, audio and video titles, and software digital libraries on local CD servers. Fully computerized, the IRC has more than 6,000 books on its shelves covering a wide variety of subjects and subscribes to 60 national and international journals/periodicals.

Other salient features of the IRC are article indexing, newspaper clippings, text database for selected newspaper articles and latest retrieval techniques to search for a particular book/subject or article from the IRC database. Internet and web facilities to search for any required material from other national and international data warehouses are available.

Department	No. of Books
Engineering Sciences Books	2900
Business Administration	2700
General Books	390
Total	5990

Fields in which books are available:

Majors Fields: Banking; Marketing; Management; Advertising; Public Administration; Business Administration; Organizational Behavior; Business Research; Health Planning & Management; Accounting; Finance; Economics; Computer; Statistics; English	Magazines: Finance of Times Fortune; Bizweek; Spider; Wall Street Journal; The Economies; Time; Pakistan and Gulf Economist; Newspapers: The Dawn; The Nation; The News; The Frontier Post

=== Transport ===
INU owns a fleet of transport including three buses, two coasters, one van and five cars to meet the conveyance facilities of the students, teaching faculty and administrative staff.

=== Auditorium ===
In the basement, the INU auditorium is a multi-use auditorium that seats 450 people. It features wonderful acoustics and a warm and welcoming ambiance. It is a perfect venue for seminars, homecoming/welcome parties, fashion shows as well as lectures, conferences, and graduations. The auditorium is equipped with sound and lighting facilities as well as collapsible walls to suit different functions.

== Sports facilities ==
=== Swimming pool ===
An indoor, all season, standard swimming pool will be operational, starting summers 2013 at INU. The swimming pool would cater to students currently studying at campus.

=== Tennis court ===
Following standard tennis court dimensions, INU has two tennis courts for the leisure of students. The courts are packed in the evenings with players. The courts can occupy players for single and doubles.

=== Table tennis ===
Table tennis stands as a favorite sport for many. INU has indoor table tennis courts where students drop by for a game.

=== Cricket ===
INU has a very active cricket team. From pavilion to ground, they mark as one of the outstanding teams of Peshawar. Run under the sport society, the cricket team has brought multiple laurels to INU by participating on the provincial and national level. Starting this year, a yearly T-20 cup is arranged by INU's sport society that harnesses their potential and further polishes their skills.

== Societies ==
INU has several active societies.

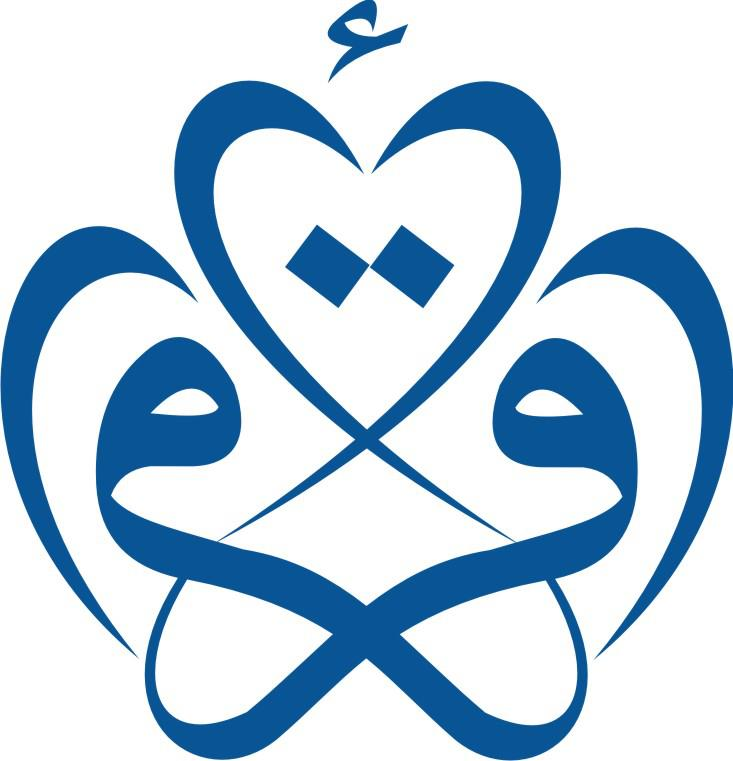
Old Logo
