= Lapis Lazuli corridor =

International transit route

Lapis Lazuli is an international transit route opened in 2018 linking Afghanistan to Turkey via Turkmenistan, Azerbaijan and Georgia.

The name “Lapis Lazuli” is derived from the historic route that Afghanistan's lapis lazuli and other semiprecious stones were exported along, over 2,000 years ago, to the Caucasus, Russia, the Balkans, Europe, and North Africa along the ancient Silk Road. The initiative will serve to reinforce the Afghan Government's Infrastructure and Connectivity Development, Energy, and Private Sector Development National Priority Programs. Currently, the transit project’s budget is estimated at $2 billion.

== History ==
The name of the transport corridor comes from the color of mineral lapis lazuli, which was one of the main items of exports from Central Asia to the Middle East, Europe, and North Africa in ancient times. Negotiations over the establishment of this new corridor date back to 2012 and continued for five years due to a number of factors in the region, including insecurity (growing domestic violence), economic instability across Central Asia, and a legacy of poorly developed infrastructure networks in the member countries involved. The Lapis Lazuli Route Transport and Transit Agreement was initiated by then Afghan foreign minister and economic cooperation minister, Wahidullah Waissi. The agreement aims to enhance regional economic cooperation and connectivity between the countries of Afghanistan, Turkmenistan, Azerbaijan, Georgia, and Turkey, thereby expanding economic and cultural links between Europe and Asia. In doing so, the initiative seeks to improve transport infrastructure and procedures (including for road, rail, and sea), increase exports, and expand the economic opportunities of citizens in countries benefiting from this new transport corridor. Barriers to regional trade and transit and transaction costs will be reduced, in part, through a new Custom Integration Procedure and, between Afghanistan and Turkmenistan, a new Cross-Border Transport Agreement. Its projected impact is considerable not only because most of the needed infrastructure is already in place, but also because most of the investment required will focus on improving policy and governance.

The Economic Rate of Return and Net Present Value still need to be established, but with a discount rate applied at 12%, the overall returns are expected to be positive. The Lapis Lazuli Route will connect with Turkey's Middle Corridor Project (“East-West Trans-Caspian Trade and Transport Corridor”).

Four technical discussions on the Lapis Lazuli Route (which encompasses a large part of CAREC Transport Corridor #2) agreement have been held, with the most recent occurring on 15-16 November 2016 in Baku that the text of the agreement finalized. The Lapis Lazuli Route agreement was signed on 15 November 2017 at the side of the Seventh RECCA in Ashgabat.

Afghan President Ashraf Ghani inaugurated the route in a Herat ceremony on December 13, 2018. The first trucks transported 175 tons of cotton, dried fruit, and sesame.

== Route ==
The corridor begins from Torghundi in western Herat Province of Afghanistan, and continues to the port (on the Caspian Sea) of Türkmenbaşy in Turkmenistan; after passing the Caspian Sea, the route continues on to Baku, capital of Azerbaijan, and then connects onward to Tbilisi, capital of Georgia, as well as the Georgian ports of Poti and Batumi; finally, the corridor will connect to the cities of Kars and Istanbul, Turkey, at the entrance of Europe.

== Objectives ==
According to the Afghanistan Chamber of Commerce and Industries (ACCI), 80 percent of goods shipped from South Asia to Europe will travel by this route (by rail in Afghanistan as well as the countries of the South Caucasus and by ship when crossing the Caspian and Black seas). Furthermore, the planned Lapis Lazuli Corridor aims to make Afghanistan less dependent on Pakistan's Port of Karachi for its exports. The lower trade barriers, reductions in transaction costs, improved cross-border governance through harmonization, increased trade and transit and enhanced regional cooperation are the major aims of the project. The corridor will function under the framework of Transport International Routier (TIR) carnet.

== See also ==
- Belt and Road Initiative
- Chabahar Port
- Ashgabat Agreement
