= Adela Raz =

Last Afghan ambassador to the United States

- عادله راز
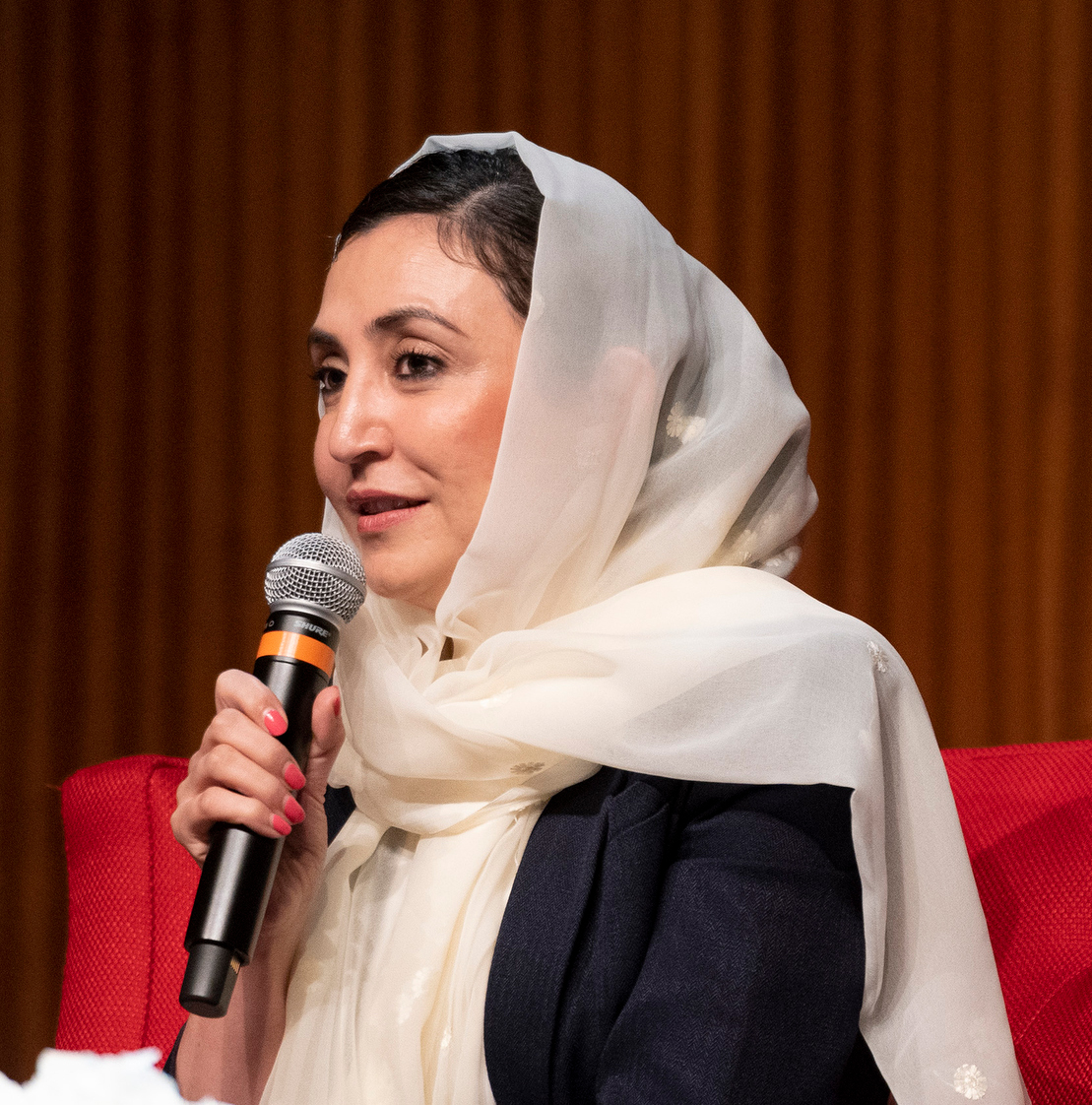
- Raz in 2022

Ambassador of Afghanistan to the United States
- In office 26 July 2021 – 18 February 2022
- President: Ashraf Ghani
- Preceded by: Roya Rahmani
- Succeeded by: Office abolished

Permanent Representative of Afghanistan to the United Nations
- In office 31 December 2018 – 1 June 2021
- Preceded by: Mahmoud Saikal
- Succeeded by: Ghulam M. Isaczai

Personal details
- Born: 1986 (age 39–40)
- Education: Simmons University (BA); Tufts University (MA)

Adela Raz (Dari: عادله راز; born 1986) is an Afghan politician who was the last ambassador of the Islamic Republic of Afghanistan to the United States from July 2021 to February 2022. She was also the first woman to serve as Permanent Representative of Afghanistan to the United Nations.

== Early life and education ==
Raz's father was killed by the Taliban because he was perceived as too progressive.

Raz has a BA with majors in International Relations, Political Science and Economics from Simmons University in Boston, and an MA in Law and Diplomacy from Tufts University. She was the first Afghan to gain an H-1B visa.

== Career ==
Raz worked from the United Nations Assistance Mission in Afghanistan. From 2010 until 2013, she worked with an international development organization in the US. She is an advocate for gender equality, women's education and human rights. She has worked to assist women develop sustainable work and participate in society.

In 2013, she was appointed Deputy Spokesperson and Director of Communications to President Hamid Karzai, the first woman to hold the positions. She became Chief of Staff in November 2014 and was appointed Deputy Foreign Minister for Economic Cooperation in March 2016 at age 30. In March 2018, she was part of a delegation of Afghan women to visit Washington DC, where she spoke about the need for more women in Afghan political life and the need for the rest of the world to consider them partners, not merely victims or recipients of aid.

On 31 December 2018, President Ashraf Ghani appointed Raz as Afghanistan's permanent representative to the United Nations, replacing Ambassador Mahmoud Saikal. She is the first woman to hold the position. In March 2019, she was unanimously selected as vice president of the UN Committee on the Exercise of the Inalienable Rights of the Palestinian People.

Raz was appointed the Afghan ambassador to the United States on 26 July 2021. Following the 2021 fall of Kabul that toppled the Islamic Republic and ushered in the return of the Taliban, Raz continued in her post despite the previous Afghan government no longer having control over the country. On 18 February 2022, Raz was reported to have resigned from her ambassadorial position.

On 14 April 2022, Raz was announced as director of the newly established Afghanistan Policy Lab, an Afghanistan-focused policy institute. The lab is a joint venture between Princeton University's School of Public and International Affairs and the Liechtenstein Institute on Self-Determination.

== Personal life ==
She is married to Matin Bek, former Chief of Staff to Afghan former President Ashraf Ghani.
