= Mohammad Anwar Anwarzai =

Afghan diplomat

Afghanistan Ambassador to Pakistan
- In office 2007–2008
- President: Hamid Karzai
- Preceded by: Nangyalai Tarzi
- Succeeded by: Abdul Khaliq Farahi

Afghanistan Ambassador to Australia
- In office 2005–2007
- Preceded by: Mahmoud Saikal
- Succeeded by: Amanullah Jayhoon

Personal details
- Born: 1937 (age 88–89) Kabul, Afghanistan
- Profession: Diplomat

Mohammad Anwar Anwarzai is the Head of United Nations Department at the Afghan Foreign Ministry and a former Afghan ambassador to Pakistan.

== Diplomat in the 70s ==
He started his career as a civil servant in 1960 and worked in various sections of the Afghan Ministry of Foreign Affairs. He then got a diplomatic assignment as junior member in the Permanent Mission of Afghanistan to the United Nations. From 1964 to 1969 Anwarzai worked as Second Secretary directly under the supervision of the late Ambassador Abdul Rahman Pazhwak. From 1973 to 1976 Anwarzai served as the first Secretary in the Afghanistan Embassy in Moscow, USSR. From 1976-1978 he served as the Head of the Mission as Charged d' Affair in Tripoli, Libya.

== During the Soviet invasion ==
After the Soviet invasion Anwarzai and his family became political refugees and spent the next twenty three in exile. During 1979 to 1989 Mr. Anwarzai was actively involved in promoting the cause of Afghan Freedom Fighters, attending seminars, US Senate hearing, delivering speeches at conferences, dissemination information about the Afghan struggle for liberation and exposing the Soviet atrocities in Afghanistan. Anwarzai was also involved in organizing street demonstrations in front of UN and the Soviet Mission in New York.

== Return to Afghanistan ==
In February 2002, immediately after the Bonn Agreement, Anwarzai returned to Afghanistan and was assigned to the Afghan Foreign Ministry as the Director of the Fourth Political Department responsible for European countries.

From 2004 to 2005 Anwarzai was appointed as Minister Counselor at the Afghanistan Mission to the United Nations Office at Geneva.

In 2004, Anwarzai founded with several others the Global Partnership for Afghanistan, an environmental and economic development organization. Until 2005 he was member of the Board of Directors of the Global Partnership for Afghanistan where he served as the Vice-President and the Chief Operation Officer.

== Ambassador ==
In 2005 he was appointed as Ambassador of Afghanistan to Australia and he presented his credentials on 24 November to major General Michael Jeffery and made a farewell call on 17 February 2007 when he left as ambassador to Australia.

As ambassador to Australia, Anwarzai chastised the Australian Prime Minister, John Howard, for saying it was unacceptable for Australian soldiers to put their lives on the line for a country that persecuted Christians. Mr Anwarzai said that the death sentence for apostasy was in accordance with Islamic law. "We appreciate the assistance and help of the friendly countries … but we should not forget that this is a common cause that we are fighting for … and we would appreciate very much if this assistance could not be linked to anything else."

In 2007 later Anwarzai became Ambassador to Pakistan. Anwarzai presented his credentials to Pakistani president Pervez Musharraf on July 31, 2007. Upon completion of his tenure, Anwarzai left Islamabad on September 4, 2008.

As Ambassador to Pakistan, Anwarzai said that the exit of Pervez Musharraf from the office of Presidency would strengthen the democratic institutions in Pakistan.

His successor as ambassador, Abdul Khaliq Farahi, was kidnapped by unknown armed men, before he could be installed as ambassador.

== Back to Foreign Ministry ==
He then became the Head of United Nations Department at the Afghan Foreign Ministry, and as such attended the climate change negotiation in Barcelona- Spain in November 2009.
