= Permanent Mission of Afghanistan to the United Nations =

Delegates formal title

The Permanent Mission of Afghanistan to the United Nations is the formal title of Afghanistan's delegation to the United Nations. Afghanistan officially joined the United Nations on 19 November 1946 as the Kingdom of Afghanistan. The delegation is now mostly non-functional due to the UN's de-recognition of the Islamic Republic of Afghanistan, refusal to answer to its former officials, and it allowing acting representative Naseer Faiq, a junior diplomat who has renounced the Islamic Republic, to remain in his post indefinitely despite his minimal participation in the operations of the UN. His voting rights at the General Assembly were removed in 2024.

== Leadership ==
The Permanent Representative of Afghanistan to the United Nations is the leader of the Afghanistan Mission to the United Nations.

The current Charge d'affairs (a concept meant to denote an interim representation between ambassadors) of Afghanistan is Naseer Faiq, who has stated that both he and the mission as a whole are no longer affiliated with the Islamic Republic of Afghanistan because UN bodies determined it stopped being the officially recognized government on 15 August 2021, when it ceased functioning.

The Taliban, who are in effective control of most of Afghanistan have nominated Suhail Shaheen as their envoy to the United Nations in September 2021, but their request has not been approved.

== Headquarters ==
The Afghanistan Permanent Mission to the United Nations is housed in a building located at 633 Third Avenue Floor 27 A, New York 10017.

== See also ==
- Afghanistan and the United Nations
- List of current permanent representatives to the United Nations
- Foreign relations of Afghanistan
- Diplomatic missions of Afghanistan
