= Abdul Matin Baig =

Afghan politician (born 1987)

Matin Bek
- Born: 1987 (age 38–39); Hazar Sumuch District, Takhar Province, Afghanistan
- Other names: Abdul Matin Beyk
- Occupation: Chief of Staff to President of Afghanistan Ashraf Ghani

Matin Bek (born in 1987 in Hazar Sumuch District, Takhar Province), also known as Abdul Matin Beyk, was the Chief of Staff to President of Afghanistan Ashraf Ghani.

== Early life and education ==
He was born in Takhar province in 1987. He has a bachelor's degree from Delhi University and a master's degree in political science from Jawaharlal Nehru University. He was one of 29 children his father had with his 4 wives.

== Political career ==
Bek has worked as an adviser to the Ministry of Interior Affairs and to the deputy head of National Directorate of Security for provinces.

In 2017 Bek was appointed chairman of the Independent Directorate of Local Governance (IDLG). In this role he focused on developing a merit based model of appointing governors rather than the patronage based network and also worked on women's rights. He was a member of the negotiating committee between the Islamic Republic of Afghanistan and the Taliban.

He was a strong supporter of ousted president Ashraf Ghani following the Fall of Kabul in 2021. Bek later said he wished he had not supported Ghani, saying, "I had lost my father, members of my family, and I dreamt a united and developed country and was struggling for my dream Afghanistan... Today I realized that I was deceived and betrayed."

== Media ==
He was interviewed for the BBC documentary Afghanistan: Getting Out.

== Personal life ==
His wife is Adela Raz. She was the Afghan Ambassador of Afghanistan to the United States from 26 July 2021 to 18 February 2022. They starred in a BBC World Service podcast together.

Bek's father, Abdul Motalib Bek, was a Tajik tribal leader, member of parliament, and anti-Soviet Mujahid of the United Front, who was killed by a Taliban suicide bomber on 25 December 2011.
