= Naseer Faiq =

Afghan diplomat (born 1985)

Naseer Ahmad Faiq
- نصیراحمد فایق
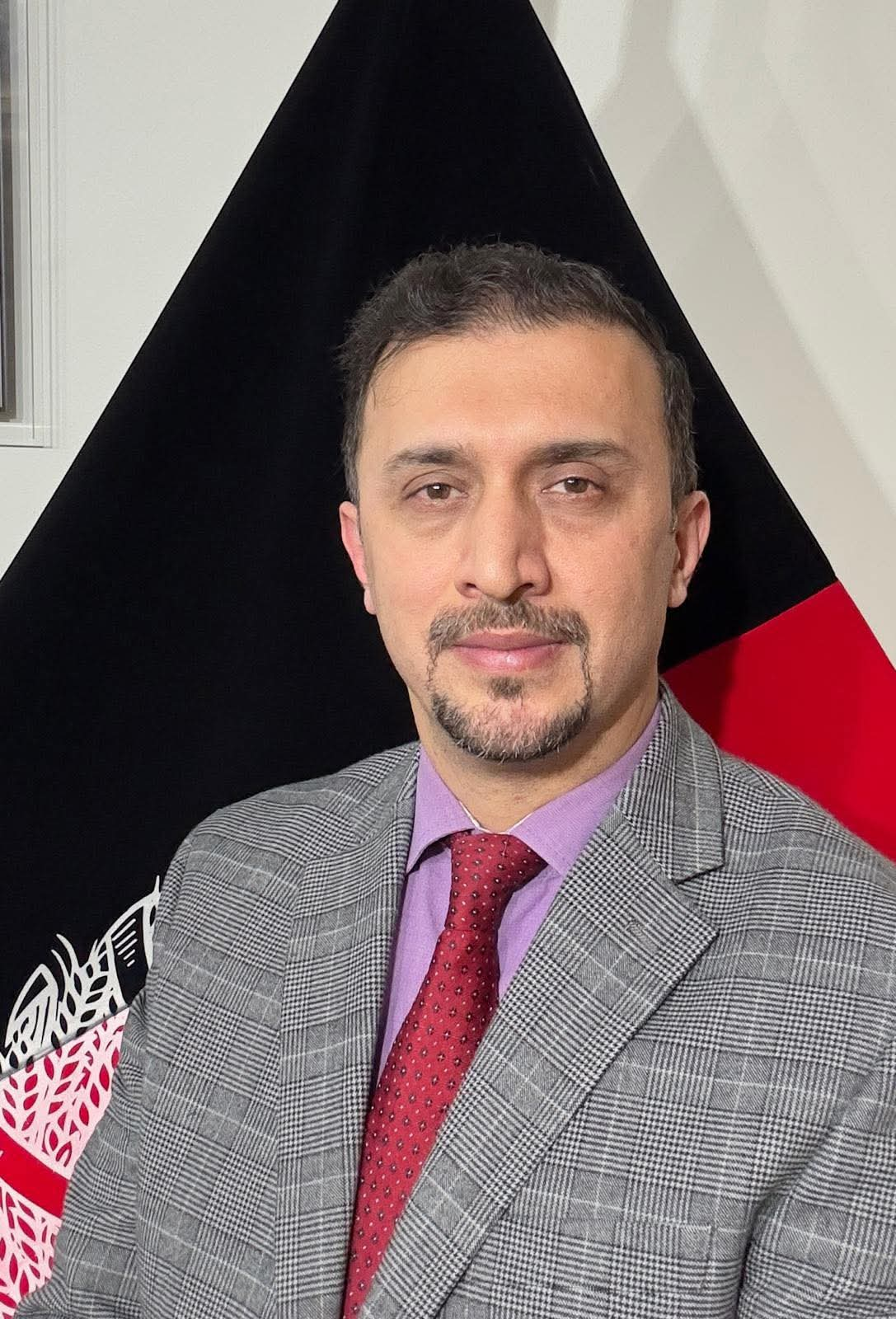

Permanent Representative of Afghanistan to the United Nations (chargé d'affaires)
- Incumbent
- Assumed office 17 December 2021
- Appointed by: Ghulam M. Isaczai

Deputy Director General for Regional Cooperation, Ministry of Foreign Affairs
- In office 2016–2019

Economic Counsellor, Permanent Mission of Afghanistan to the United Nations
- In office 2013–2016

Deputy Director General for Regional Cooperation, Ministry of Foreign Affairs
- In office 2012–2013

Advisor to the Deputy Foreign Minister]
- In office 2011–2012

Third Secretary, Permanent Mission of Afghanistan to the United Nations, New York
- In office 2008–2010

Personal details
- Born: 1985 (age 40–41) Kabul, Afghanistan
- Education: Kabul University (Bachelor's degree); Fairleigh Dickinson University (MScA)
- Website: afghanmission-un.org

Naseer Ahmad Faiq (Dari: نصیراحمد فایق) is an Afghan diplomat currently serving as the chargé d'affaires ad interim of the Permanent Mission of Afghanistan to the United Nations in New York since 16 December 2021. He continues to represent Afghanistan at the UN following the fall of the Islamic Republic of Afghanistan in August 2021.

== Early life and education ==
Faiq was born in Kabul and completed his early education at Amani High School, graduating in 2001. He earned a Bachelor's degree in Law and Political Science from Kabul University in 2005, and later obtained a Master of Administrative Science (MASc) from Fairleigh Dickinson University in the United States in 2010.

== Diplomatic career ==
Faiq joined the Ministry of Foreign Affairs of Afghanistan in 2005, beginning his diplomatic career in the Minister's Office. Over the years, he has held several senior positions both at the Ministry and abroad.

Throughout his diplomatic service, Faiq has represented Afghanistan at various international forums and negotiations, including United Nations Security Council sessions, Sustainable Development Goals (SDG) negotiations, the Heart of Asia–Istanbul Process Ministerial and Senior Officials Meetings, and g7+ summits.

He has also led Afghanistan's delegations to the 77th, 78th, 79th, and 80th sessions of the United Nations General Assembly, delivering statements and engaging in multilateral discussions on human rights, humanitarian response, peacebuilding, and gender equality.

=== Diplomatic context ===
Following the Taliban's takeover of Afghanistan in August 2021, the United Nations did not recognize the Taliban's nominee for the Afghan seat. Faiq has since continued to serve as the acting head of mission of Afghanistan's Permanent Mission to the UN. He has stated that he does not represent the Islamic Republic of Afghanistan, instead serving as an independent voice for Afghanistan at the UN.

== Awards and recognition ==
Faiq has received awards and official commendations from the Ministry of Foreign Affairs of Afghanistan in recognition of his diplomatic service and contributions to Afghanistan's international representation.
