= Afghan Film Festival in Australia =

The Afghan film festival in Australia was established in 2019 as an annual showcase of Afghan cinema in Australia. It takes place in Canberra and is jointly hosted by the Embassy of the Islamic Republic of Afghanistan and the ANU Film Group, at the Australian National University.

== 2019 First Afghan Film Festival ==
The inaugural Afghan film festival took place between the 15th and 21 November 2019 and was held at the ANU Kambri Precinct Cultural Centre. The festival was opened by Afghanistan’s Ambassador to Australia, Wahidullah Waissi. The Afghan Embassy’s co-hosting of the event was part of its commemoration of the 100th Anniversary of Afghan independence, and concurrently the 50th anniversary of official diplomatic relations with Australia. In attendance were diplomats, officials, Afghan filmmakers and ANU students. Numerous classic and contemporary Afghan films were screened, including many directed by Afghan women, as well as various documentaries about Afghanistan and Afghans in Australia.

=== Films Screened ===
- Hava, Maryam and Ayesha, 2019, directed by Sahraa Karimi.
- Begana, 1986, directed by Siddiq Barmak.
- Afghan Cameleers in Australia, 2014, directed by Fahim Hashimy.
- Osama, 2004, directed by Siddiq Barmak.
- What I Saw on the Roof of the World, 2019, directed by Parwiz Shamal.
- The Orphanage, 2019, directed by Shahrbanoo Sadat.
- A Letter to the President, 2017, directed by Roya Sadat.
- The Patience Stone, 2012, directed by Atiq Rahimi.
- Jirga, 2018, directed by Benjamin Gilmour.
- RocKabul, 2018, directed by Travis Beard.
