= Popcorn Taxi =

Australian independent film festival

Popcorn Taxi was an Australian independent non-competitive film festival that presented regular film screenings followed by a live Q&A with related 'talent' immediately afterward. The unique nature of each screening was that the events provide patrons with the opportunity to discuss the film with the filmmaker, actor, producer, et al. immediately after viewing it. Feature films, shorts, TV projects and documentaries were all represented within Popcorn Taxi.

Popcorn Taxi's aim was to explore the decisions behind why artists make the choices they do, and how they brought their visions to the screen.

Some of Popcorn Taxi's on-stage guests have included Quentin Tarantino, Baz Luhrmann, Guillermo del Toro, Kevin Spacey, Rob Zombie, Terry Gilliam, John Cleese, Vince Gilligan, Wes Anderson, Eddie Izzard, Andrew Stanton, Ben Burtt, Richard Kelly (director), Kevin Smith, George Miller, Dennis Hopper, Wim Wenders, Tim Robbins, Danny Boyle, Errol Morris, Roger Corman, Richard Linklater, Philip Glass, Ewan McGregor, Adam Yauch, Jerry Lewis, Ang Lee, Andrew Dominik, Karen Allen, Tom Hiddleston, Simon Pegg, Nick Frost, Edgar Wright, and Richard Armitage,

== History ==
The event was founded in 1999 by filmmakers Gary Doust and Matt Wheeldon.

In 2008, the entity was run by Chris Murray, (founding editor of Empire Magazine, Australia) & Peter Taylor, who jointly own The Neon Group.

== Awards ==
- 2000 Byron Kennedy Award by the Australian Film Institute
- 2003 Festival of the Year Award by IF Magazine
