= Surkhrud =

Village in Nangarhar Province, Afghanistan

Surkhrud (Pashto: سرخ رود) is a village in eastern Afghanistan in Nangarhar Province. Located at the west side of Jalalabad, near the Kabul River and the highway between Jalalabad and Kabul. It is one of dozens of villages in the Surkh-Rōd district and is estimated to have a population of 5,000 people.

Opium poppy was grown in Surkrud in the past, but stopped when it was outlawed by the Taliban. Currently main crops there are wheat, corn and rice.

== See also ==
- Nangarhar Province
