= Tatara Park =

Park in Peshawar

Tatara Park باغ تاتارا
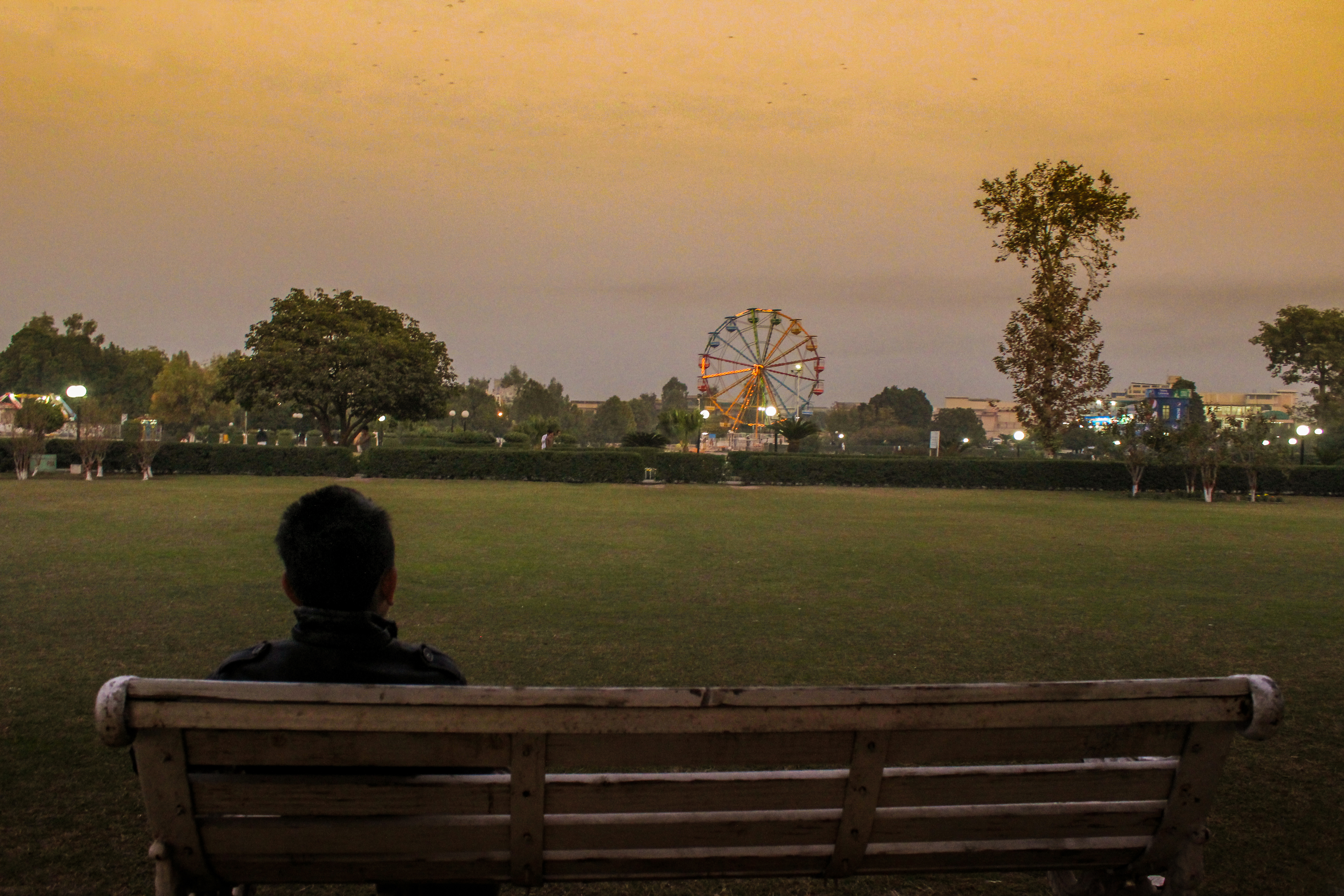
- View of the park
- Interactive map of Tatara Park باغ تاتارا
- Location: Hayatabad, Khyber Pakhtunkhwa, Pakistan
- Nearest city: Peshawar
- Coordinates: 33.9812°N 71.4439°E
- Status: Functional

Tatara Park (Urdu: باغ تاتارا, romanized: Bagh-e-Tatara, Pashto: د باغ تاتارا) is a recreational park located in Phase 1, Hayatabad, Peshawar. Tatara Park has been developed from a garden lawn with man-made lakes, into a theme park.

It is one of the most visited recreational parks located in Hayatabad. It is located near Bagh-e-Naran.

== See also ==
- Shahi Bagh
- List of parks and gardens in Pakistan
