= Peshawar Development Authority =

Public-benefit corporation in the Peshawar, Pakistan

- د پېښور پرمختیايي اداره

Agency overview
- Formed: 1978; 48 years ago
- Jurisdiction: Peshawar
- Headquarters: Phase 5, PDA building
- Agency executive: Mian Behzad Adil, Director General
- Website: pda.gkp.pk

The Peshawar Development Authority (Pashto: د پېښور پرمختیايي اداره, abbreviated as PDA) is a public benefit corporation responsible for providing municipal services in Peshawar. In 1975, the Greater Peshawar Metropolitan Authority (PMA) was created under Urban Planning Act 1975. In 1978 PMA was renamed as the Peshawar Development Authority (PDA).

== Responsibilities and Services ==
The Peshawar Development Authority is the department in charge of construction in Peshawar. This includes roads, parks, and plant life. The authority has developed mega housing schemes like Hayatabad and Regi Model Town besides constructing almost all major and small roads of Peshawar District, including the 30-km-long GT-Jamrud Road and the 50-km-long Rind Road and all flyovers in the city.

The Peshawar Development Authority is the only self-sustaining government entity of Khyber Pakhtunkhwa province that works under an independent and fully autonomous board under direct supervision of the chief minister as its chairperson and the director general of PDA as secretary to the board.

The Peshawar Development Authority has an active working strength of around 4,600 employees divided into 23 directorates with geographic spread to the entire Peshawar Division including the districts of Peshawar, Charsadda, and Nowshera and with operational spheres starting from roads and buildings constructions to horticulture, parks development, street lighting, sanitation services, fire-fighting to security and town planning and development. The authority is headed by the director general.
