= Hayatabad =

Suburb of Peshawar, Khyber Pakhtunkhwa, Pakistan

Coordinates: 33°58′29.1″N 71°26′07.4″E

Hayatabad is a suburb on the western outskirts of Peshawar, the capital of the Khyber Pakhtunkhwa province of Pakistan. It borders the now defunct Tribal Areas and is close to Torkham, which is the major crossing on the Pakistan-Afghanistan border. The suburb is one of the most developed residential societies of Peshawar, and is home to several of its educational, sports and health institutions. Hayatabad is named after Hayat Sherpao, a Pakistani Pashtoon politician.

== Geography ==
Hayatabad was developed as a residential area in Peshawar in the late 1970s. Primarily residential, it also contains an Industrial Estate.

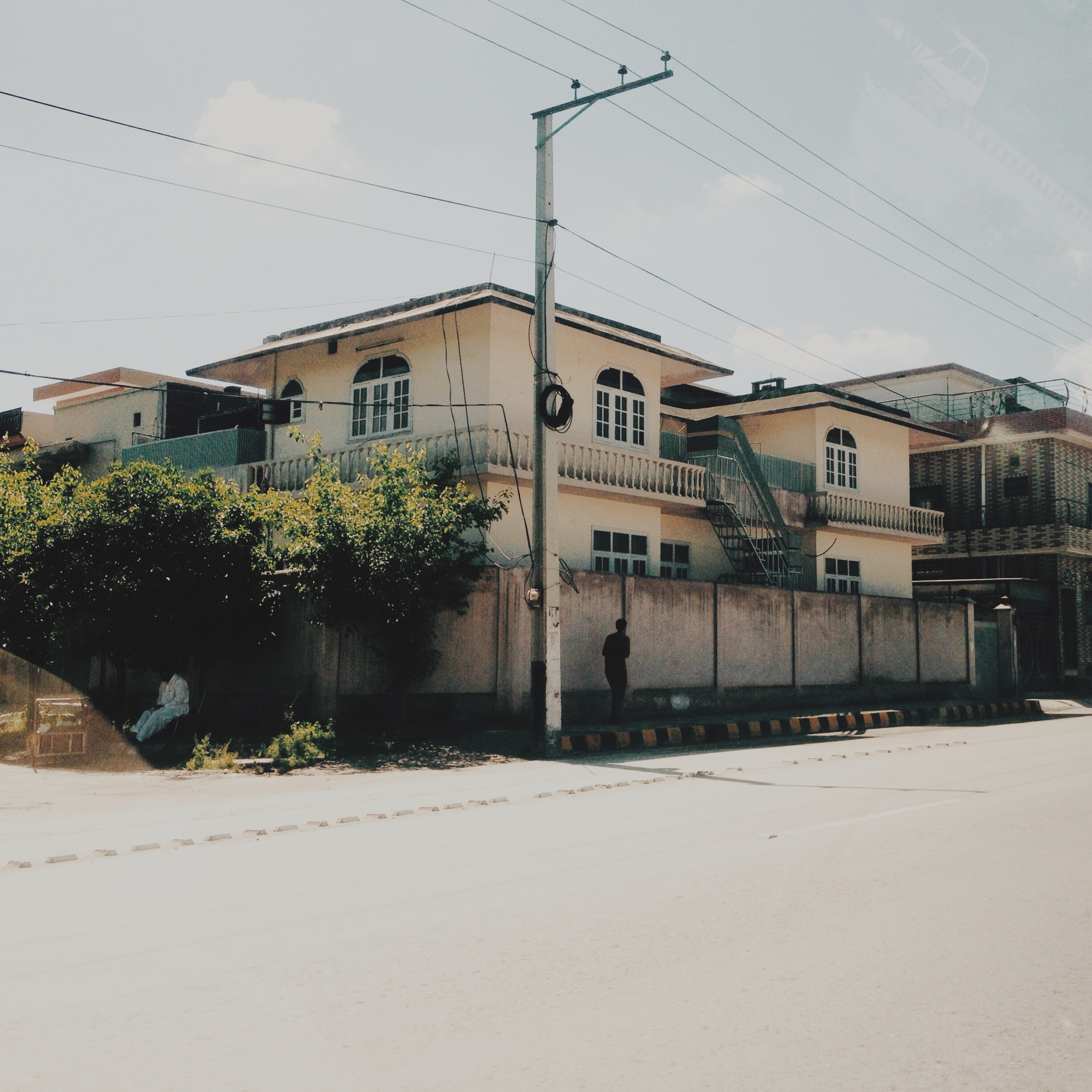
Hayatabad was developed as an upscale suburb

The government has divided Hayatabad into seven numbered phases. Each phase is subdivided into lettered sectors, A to H. The suburb can be accessed via three routes from Jamrud Road and one from the Ring Road. Hayatabad is the western most terminus of the TransPeshawar bus rapid transit line.

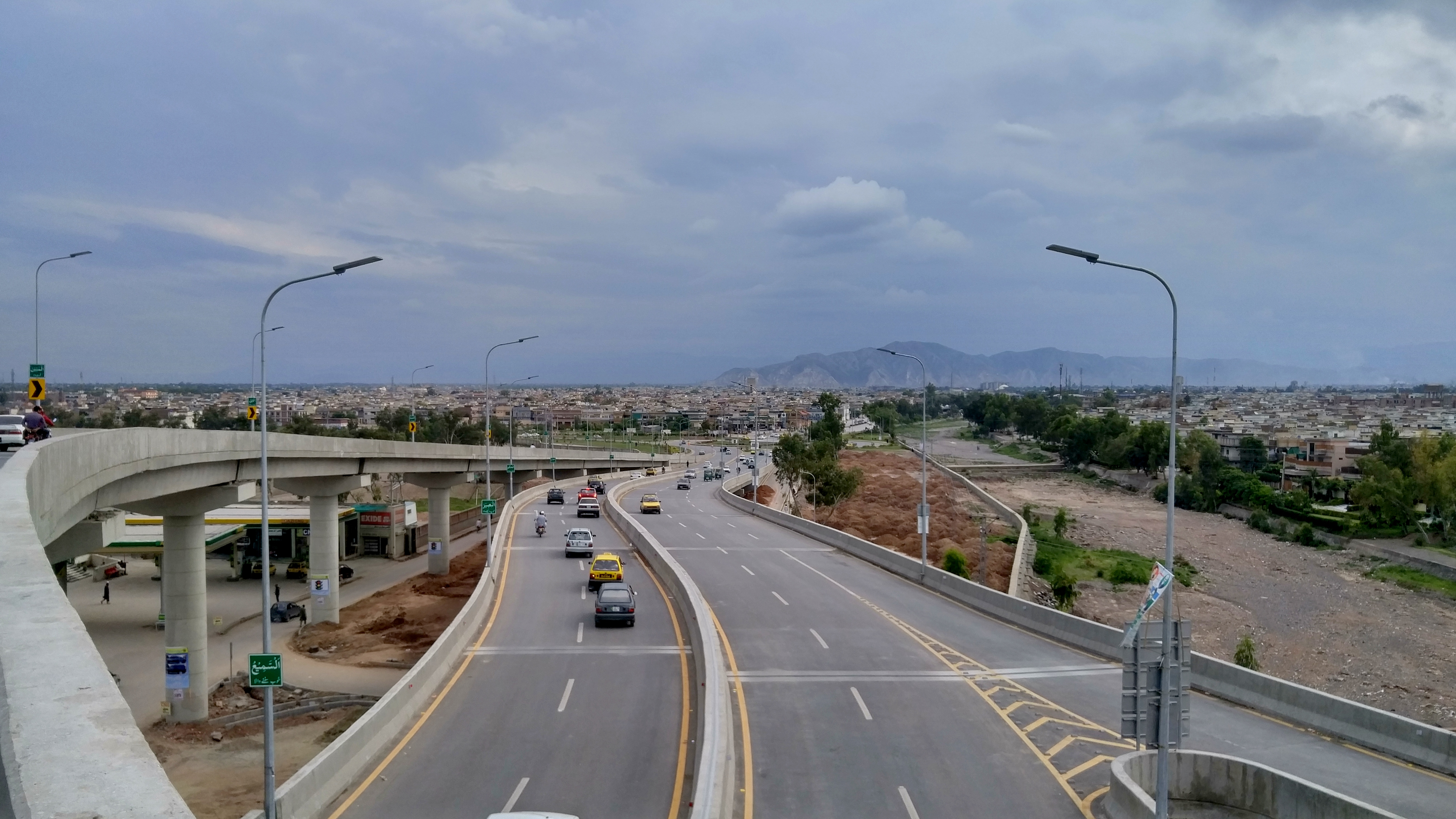

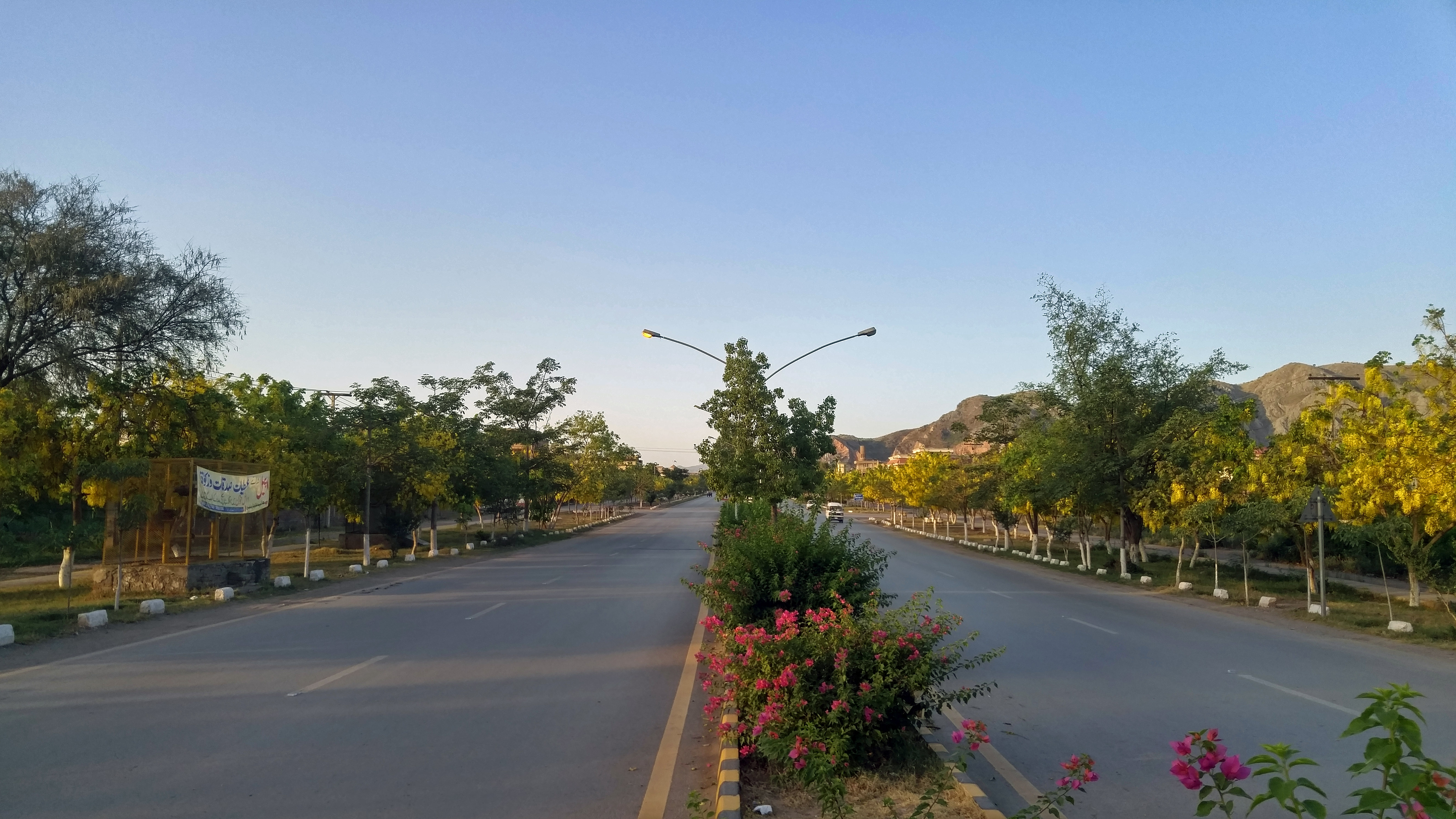

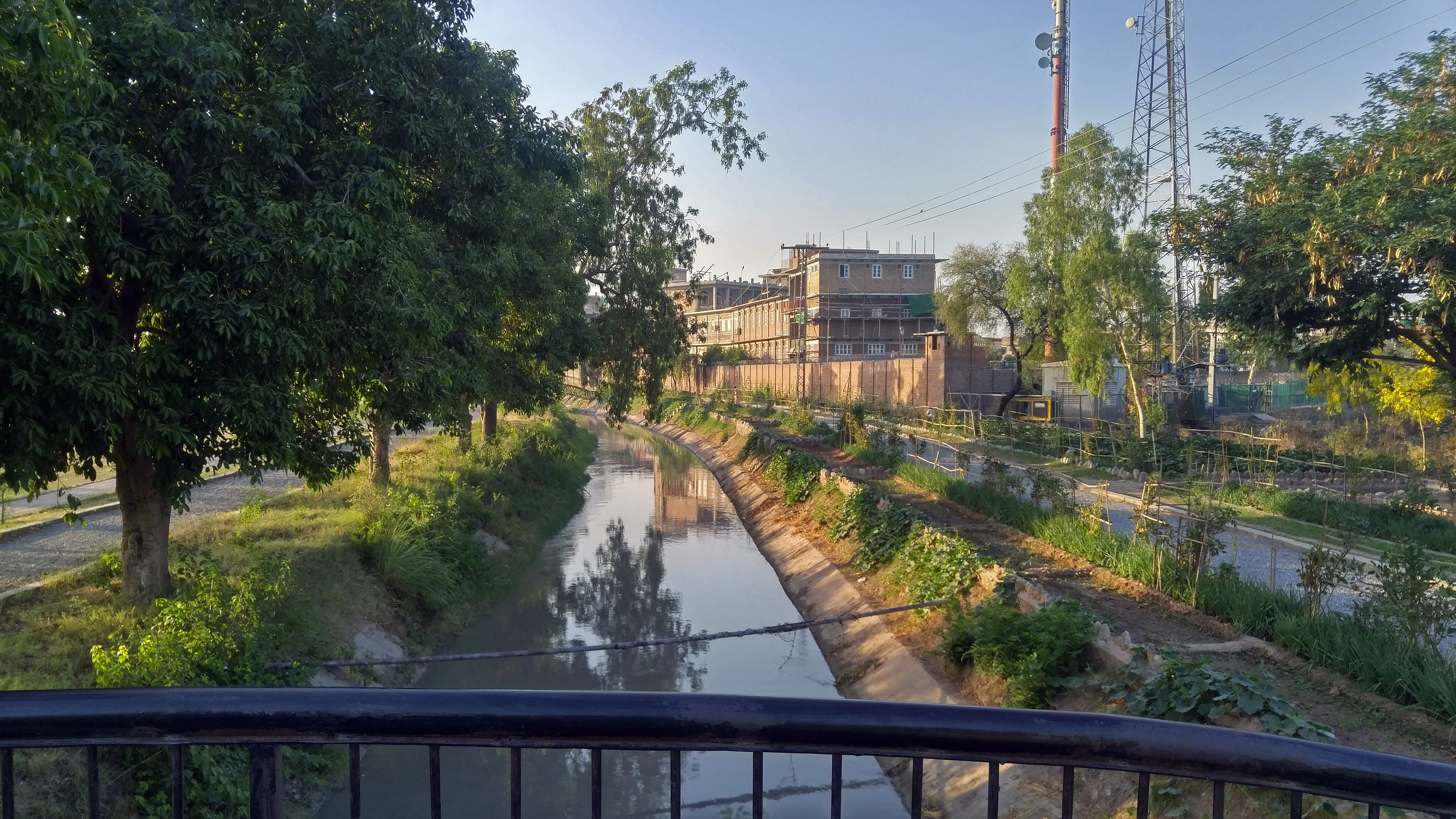
St. Francis' High School (Hayatabad, Peshawar)

== Demographics ==
The communities of Hayatabad form a diverse spectrum ranging from locals settled for generations to expatriates on temporary assignments belonging to different ethnicities and cultural backgrounds. Owing to its proximity to Peshawar and the adjoined Industrial Estate, Pashtuns and Persians, as well as Afghan refugees, reside in Hayatabad.

== Facilities ==
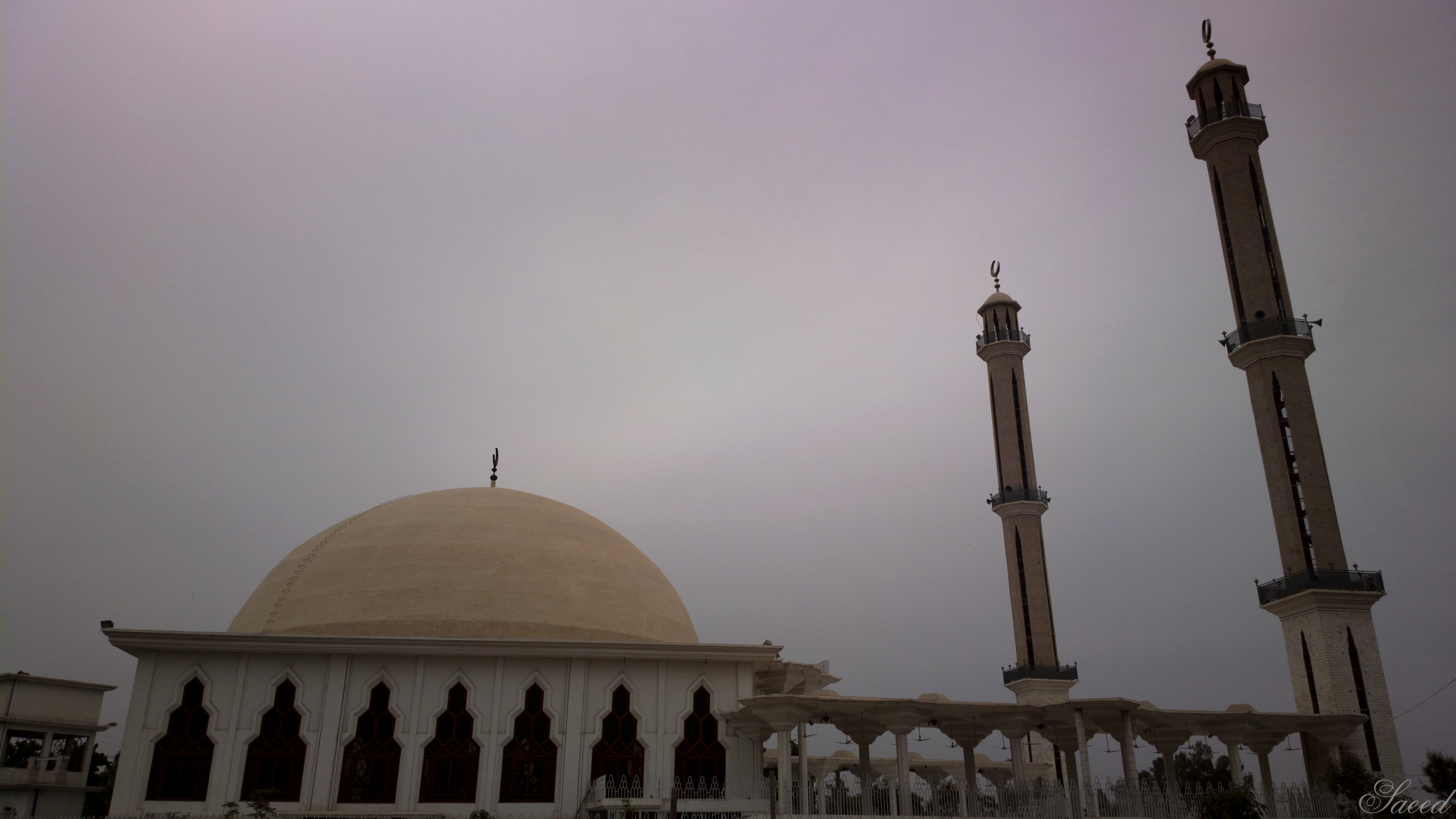
Zarghuni Mosque

Peshawar Development Authority (PDA) is responsible for maintenance and development of the city, including Hayatabad. There are plenty of schools, colleges, universities, hospitals & clinics, parks, shopping malls, international cricket stadiums, futsal grounds and commercial offices in the suburb.

== Hospitals ==
There are several general and specialized hospitals, along with private practice clinics available. The hospitals are primarily located in Phase 4 and 5, whereas private practice clinics are found in almost all phases. A list of hospitals is given below:

- Hayatabad Medical Complex
- Habib Physiotherapy Complex
- Shaukat Khanum Memorial Cancer Hospital & Research Center
- Rehman Medical Institute
- North West General Hospital
- Peshawar Institute of Cardiology
- Paraplegic Center Peshawar
- Life Care Hospital Hayatabad
- Peshawar General Hospital
- Peshawar Institute of Medical Sciences
- Health Net Hospital
- Fountain House Peshawar
- AIMS Pakistan's https://sugarhospital.com/

== Educational institutions ==
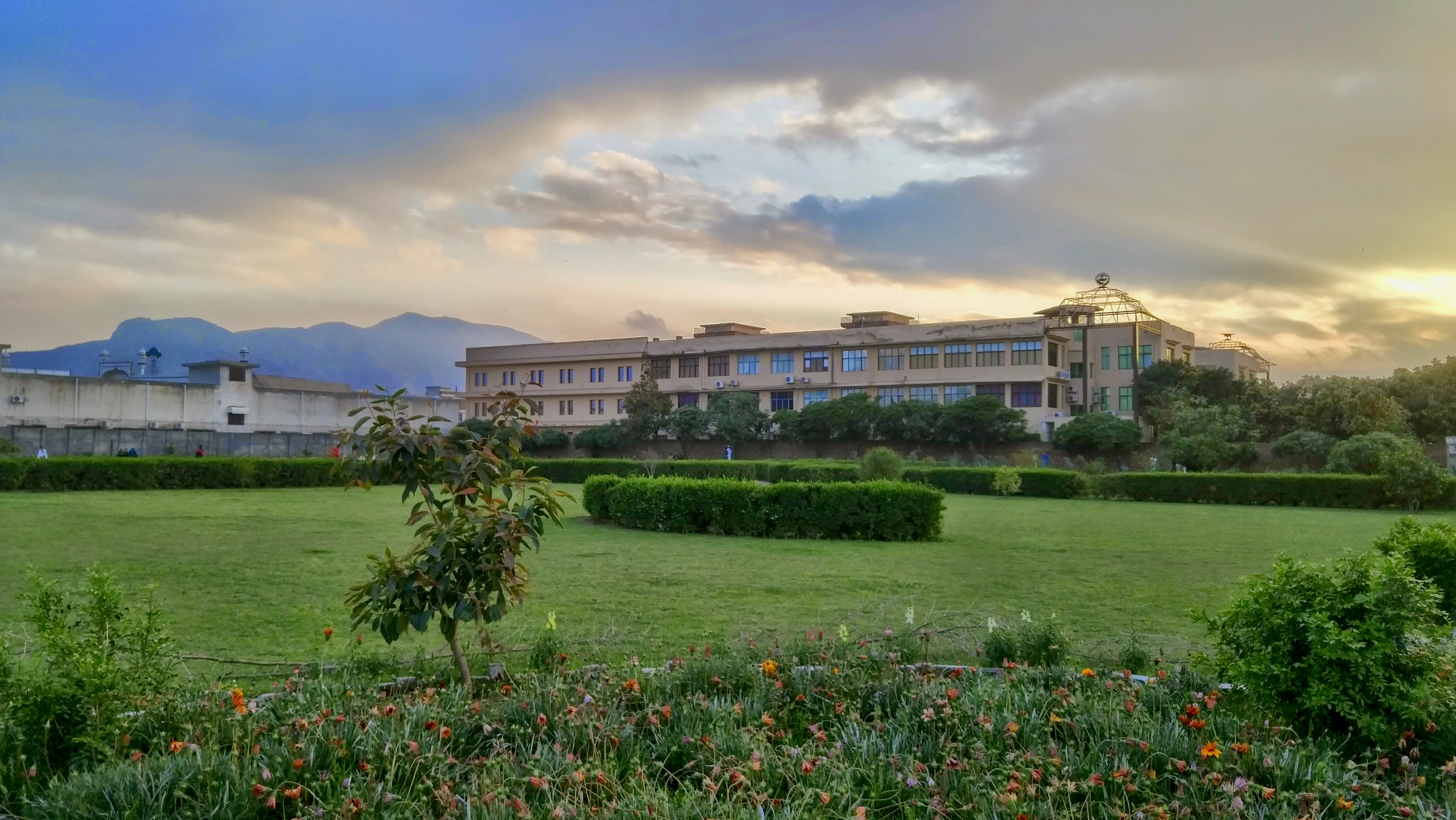
View of CECOS University from F5 Park

Phase 1:

- FAST NUCES, Peshawar Campus (Industrial Estate)
- The City Nursery, Hayatabad
- Forward Girls College

Phase 2:

- International Islamic University Islamabad Schools, Khyber Campus (IIUI)
- Beaconhouse School System Junior Campus
- Forward Public School
- Iqra National University
- Forward Boys College

Phase 3:

- Forward Model School
- Qurtuba University
- Qurtuba Public School and College
- The City School Hayatabad Junior

Phase 4:

- Frontier Children's Academy
- Frontier Youth Academy
- Frontier Science Academy
- Hayatabad Model School
- Learning Institute of Modern Sciences
- Post Graduate Medical Institute Peshawar
- LIMS School and College

Phase 5:

- PakTurk Maarif International Schools and Colleges
- Khyber Medical University
- Pak International Medical College
- Khyber Girls Medical College
- The City School Peshawar Campus Hayatabad
- Institute of Public Health and Social Sciences (IPH&SS)
- Institute of Physical Medicine and Rehabilitation (IPM&R)
- Rehman Medical College
- Northwest School of Medicine

Phase 6:

- Beaconhouse School System Senior Campus
- St. Francis' High School
- CECOS University of IT and Emerging Sciences
- Government Degree College for Boys

Phase 7:

- Institute of Management Sciences (IMSciences)

== Parks ==
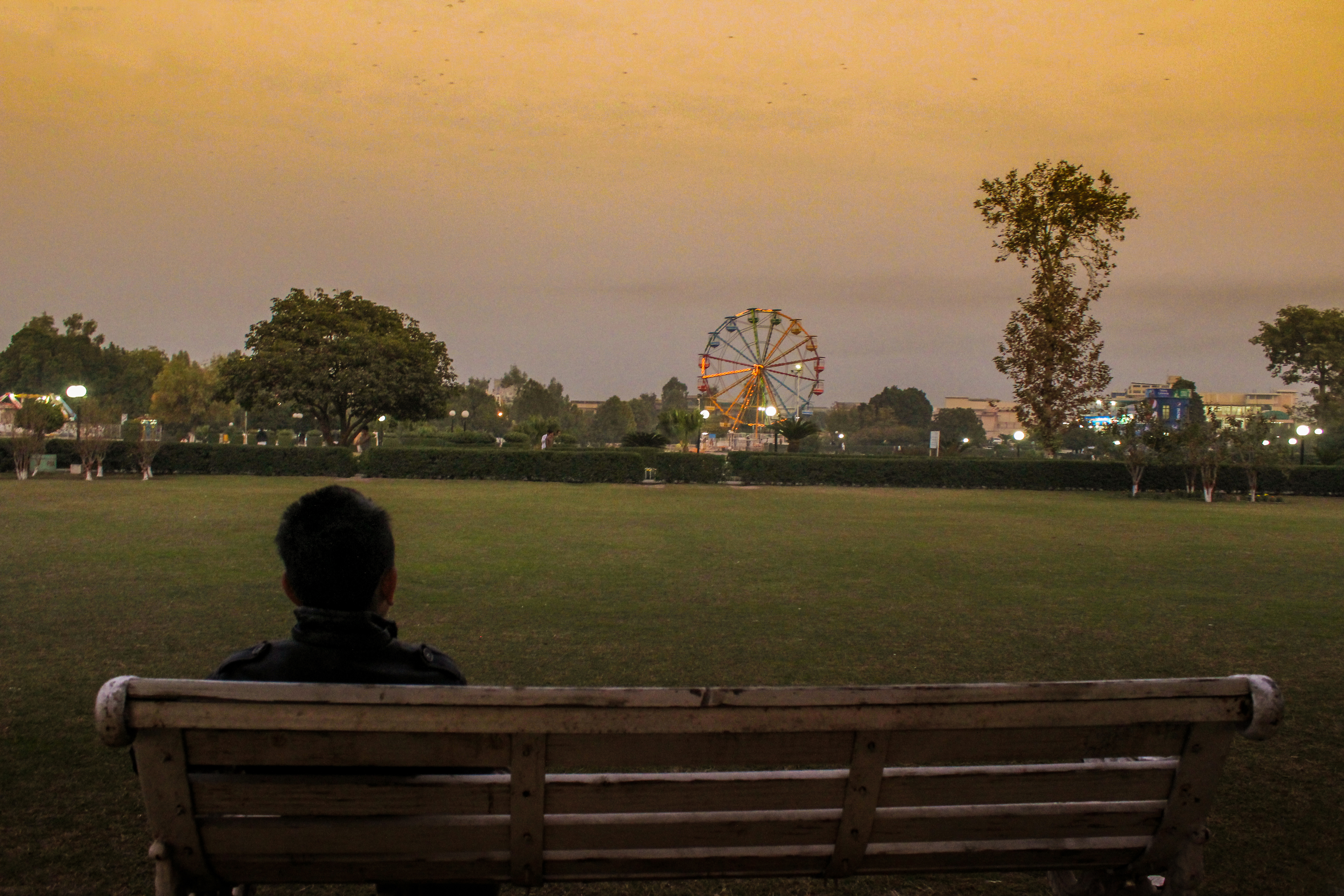
Tatara Park

- Bagh-e-Naraan (Phase 1)
- Tatara Park (Phase 1)
- Ghani Bagh (Phase 2)
- Zahed Market Park (Phase 2)
- Yousafzai Market Park (Phase 3)
- Khattak Market Park (Phase 3)
- Complex Park (Phase 4)
- Afridi Market Park (Phase 4)
- Ladies Park (Phase 4)
- Khyber Park (Phase 5)
- Shalman Park (Phase 6)
- Bangash Market Park (Phase 6)
- Behram Park (Phase 7)
