= Wahidullah Waissi =

Afghan diplomat

His Excellency Wahidullah Waissi وحیدالله ویسی

Ambassador of Afghanistan to Australia
- Incumbent
- Assumed office March 1, 2017
- President: Ashraf Ghani
- Preceded by: Nasir Ahmad Andisha

Director-General for Economic Cooperation
- In office August 5, 2012 – February 21, 2017
- Preceded by: Daud Yar
- Succeeded by: Hassan Soroosh

Personal details
- Born: Kabul, Afghanistan
- Education: Asia Pacific College of Diplomacy, Australian National University; Williams College, United States; Kabul University, Afghanistan
- Website: www.afghanembassy.au

Wahidullah Waissi is a career Afghan diplomat. He is now serving as the ambassador of the Islamic Republic of Afghanistan to the Commonwealth of Australia, New Zealand and Republic of Fiji. After Taliban's takeover in August 2021, the Ambassador and the Embassy of Islamic Republic of Afghanistan in Canberra continue in fulfilling diplomatic responsibilities under the Vienna Convention of Diplomatic Relations of 1961, operating outside the realm of Taliban influence.

Waissi worked as Director-General for Economic Cooperation at the Ministry of Foreign Affairs of Islamic Republic of Afghanistan from 2012 to 2016 overseeing regional economic cooperation and multilateral development partnerships, chaired multiple economic diplomacy committees, coordinated Regional Economic Cooperation Conference for Afghanistan process and projects and served as a Focal Point for economic Confidence Building Measures (CBMs) of the Heart of Asia Istanbul Process. He also served as a National Focal Point for International Contact Group (ICG) of Special Representatives for Afghanistan and Pakistan from its establishment, 2009 until his appointment to Australia in late 2016.

Waissi is co-founder and Chair of the Green Club, a voluntarily association on environment and green activities. He used to teach economic development at the University of Afghanistan and writes on development, region, geoeconomics and socio-development issues.

== Early life and education ==
Wahidullah Waissi was born in Kabul. He has studied in the United States and holds MA in Development Economics from Center for Development Economics of Williams College. Waissi was one of the first Afghan students studied at the CDE. Among them were fellows from countries near Afghanistan—the Kyrgyz Republic, Uzbekistan and Georgia.

He is a visiting scholar of the Central Asia-Caucasus Institute of the SAIS/Johns Hopkins University in Washington DC, a fellowship program for raising regional leaders in government, commerce, and academia from Central Asia, Mongolia, the Caucasus and Afghanistan (CAMCA).

Waissi had also studied Results-based management at the Shanghai-based Asia-Pacific Finance and Development Institute (AFDI) in 2007 under a fellowship granted from Shanghai International Program for Development Evaluation Training (SHIPDET) program.

== Diplomatic career ==
Waissi joined Ministry of Foreign Affairs in 2012 as Senior Advisor on regional cooperation. Later, he was appointed as Director-General for Economic Cooperation at the Ministry of Foreign Affairs of Islamic Republic of Afghanistan (2012 to 2016). In this position he oversaw regional economic cooperation and multilateral development partnerships, chairing Economic Diplomacy Committee, coordinates Regional Economic Cooperation Conference for Afghanistan and serving as a national Focal Point for economic Confidence Building Measures of Heart of Asia Istanbul Process.

Waissi was coordinating infrastructure project negotiation phases for TAPI, CASA-1000, TAT Railway, regional transit and transport agreements and projects and Special Economic Zones/Dry Ports.

=== Ambassador accredited to Australia, New Zealand and Fiji ===
Waissi was appointed as the Ambassador Extraordinary and Plenipotentiary of the Islamic Republic of Afghanistan to the Commonwealth of Australia in February 2017 and as a non-resident Ambassador to New Zealand and Fiji on 12 August 2017 and 24 April 2018, respectively. As an ambassador, this is his first mission abroad. Waissi has submitted his letter of credentials to Sir Peter Cosgrove, Governor-General of the Commonwealth of Australia on 1 March 2017 and to Dame Patsy Reddy, Governor-General of New Zealand on 6 September 2017 as the fifth Ambassador of Afghanistan to both Australia and New Zealand. As the first Afghan President visiting Australia, Dr. Mohammad Ashraf Ghani arrived to Canberra on 2 April 2017 for an almost 3 days visit. Marking the visit, Prime Minister Malcolm Turnbull said Afghanistan and Australia had forged a "solid connection" for more than a century. From Afghan cameleers in the 1860s, through to the Australian military effort to free Afghanistan of terrorism, the two nations have long maintained a healthy partnership. Discussions were mainly focused on security and development co-operation.

=== Regional Economic Cooperation Conference on Afghanistan (RECCA) ===
One of the efforts that have been striving to have regional economic cooperation in South and Central Asia so as to assist Afghanistan is Regional Economic Cooperation Conference on Afghanistan (RECCA). RECCA is a forum that has been managed to promote stabilization in Afghanistan and South and Central Asian regional economic integration.

Waissi have been engaged on developing the first Regional Cooperation Strategy for the ANDS since 2005. This strategy made the platform for broader regional cooperation discussion among immediate neighbors and far neighboring countries of Afghanistan. The first regional economic cooperation conference under the title of RECCA has been inaugurated in Kabul in 2005. More annual RECCA meetings were hosted in New Delhi in 2006, Islamabad in 2007, Istanbul in 2009, Dushanbe in 2012 and back in Kabul in 2015. Waissi played a major role in organization and coordination of the last two RECCA events in Dushanbe and Kabul.

The RECCA process in 2015 covers a broader range of economic activities in forms of energy cooperation, connectivity, and business to business opportunities in the region. Waissi and his team at the Ministry of Foreign Affairs have launched a new website to include necessary information about status of projects under the RECCA process for a wider outreach. He also initiated identifying RECCA Focal Points from 16 countries for better coordination of regional project's implementation. The first meeting of the RECCA Focal Points took place on 26 August 2017 in Kabul. The Seventh RECCA meeting will be hosted by the Turkmenistan Government in Ashgabat in November 2017.

=== Chabahar Agreement ===
Waissi was a lead-negotiator for the International Transport and Transit Corridor (also known as the "Chabahar Agreement") on behalf of the Afghan Government since 2012, when the primary discussion over this agreement started in 2012 in Tehran among Afghanistan, Iran and India and to its signing ceremony. On 23 May 2016, the Agreement was signed in Tehran, Iran, by the Afghan Minister of Transport and Civil Aviation, the Indian Minister of Shipping, Road Transport, and Highways and the Iranian Ministry of Road and Urban Development, while the three heads of states, President Mohammad Ashraf Ghani, President Hassan Rouhani and Prime Minister Narendra Modi were present. The agreement later approved by the Cabinet of the Afghan Government on 3 August 2016 and ratified by the Afghan National Assembly (Parliament).

The Agreement aims to: 1) Facilitate access to international markets by using land, sea, and/or air transportation through Chabahar Port; and 2) Simplify, harmonize, and standardize procedures governing the international transport and transit of goods and passengers, in accordance with the international agreements and conventions in which the three signatory governments are members.

The Chabahar Agreement is the first multilateral transit and transport agreement of its kind that Afghanistan signs with other countries. It basically connects South Asia with Central Asia, and Gulf region with Central Asia and Caucasus markets. The ports in Chabahar will considerably cut transportation costs and time.

=== The Lapis Lazuli Route ===
Afghanistan as a landlocked country needs more diversified transit policy. Alternative routes and corridors are always helpful for the domestic economy as well as regional connectivity. This was the biggest motivation for Waissi to initiate an alternative transit route, later called the Lapis Lazuli Transit and Transport Route. His ideas was accepted by Jawed Ludin, former Deputy Foreign Minister of Afghanistan and later by Zarar Ahmad Osmani, former Minister of Foreign Affairs of Afghanistan. Waissi was being appointed immediately by Minister Osmani to follow with the concerned counties and coordinate to become a party to this initiative. Turkmenistan, Azerbaijan and Georgia immediately joined and Turkey was the last country to become as a party to this initiative. In early 2014 Waissi and a team of experts from the Afghan Government started the negotiation from Ashgabat in Turkmenistan. Waissi was leading the negotiation for the agreement on behalf of the Afghan Government.

The Lapis Lazuli corridor was opened for business in December 2018.

=== Multilateralism & Multilateral Diplomacy ===
Working for the Afghanistan's Aid Coordination Authority (AACA) in 2003, Waissi's main work focuses were on multilateral cooperation. He was appointed as Aid Coordination Officer at the Ministry of Finance when the AACA moved to this ministry and his areas of focus were on International Financial Institutions (IFIs) i.e. the World Bank, Asian Development Bank (ADB) and European Commission (EC) between years 2003 and 2004. In early 2004, Waissi was manager for a newly established department focusing on IFI's portfolio monitoring.

Later in 2012, as Director-General for Economic Cooperation, Waissi was mainly working on multilateral diplomatic activities throughout Afghanistan's Foreign Policy principles. Waissi represented the Afghan Government at the United Nations' General Assembly debates on G7+, G77, Land-Locked Development Countries (LLDC), Least-Development Countries (LDC), special events on Sustainable Development Goals (SDG) and Millennium Development Goals (MDG) and many other events in years 2012, 2013, 2014, 2015 and 2016.

=== Sustainable Development Goals ===
Waissi has initiated the Sustainable Development Goals & Green Economy Desk at the department of economic cooperation of Ministry of Foreign Affairs of Islamic Republic of Afghanistan to promote and increase focus on Afghanistan's green diplomacy at the regional and international level. This has enabled more cooperation between Afghanistan and its partners when Afghanistan's Sustainable Development Goals (SDGs) are developed.

Waissi participate at the Rio+20 of United Nations Conference on Sustainable Development took place in Rio de Janeiro, Brazil on 20–22 June 2012 as part of the Afghan delegation. The Government of Afghanistan has presented its position paper in support of the SDGs.

In 2013 and 2014, Waissi and his team at the Ministry of Foreign Affairs have inaugurated a first series of consultations on SDGs and adopting the goals to national level policies and plans. The first review of SDGs for Afghanistan has been developed in 2014 and submitted to the United Nations. The Government of Afghanistan endorsed the SDGs and presented its adoption policy of the post-2015 development agenda at the United Nations Sustainable Development Summit 2015 held on 25–27 September 2015, in New York City.

== Development career ==
Waissi's professional work focuses on economic development since 1998. He has worked for many national and international non-governmental organizations, UN agencies, and government in Kabul and provinces. Waissi has started his first government engagement in the field of aid management and budget policy. He has been responsible for most of the development partnership activities for Afghanistan since 2003 and has been directly involved in coordination and organizing of 22 national and international conferences for Afghanistan from 2004 to 2015 in Kabul, Berlin, Paris, Tokyo, Rome, London, Bonn, Brussels and in number of neighboring countries.

=== Afghanistan National Development Strategy ===
In June 2006, Waissi has been appointed as the Coordinator and Formulation Manager for the Interim-Afghanistan National Development Strategy (I-ANDS) at the Office of the Senior Economic Advisor to the President of the Islamic Republic of Afghanistan, Professor M. Ishaq Nadiri (Former President Hamid Karzai). The I-ANDS was served as the interim Poverty Reduction Strategy Paper (I-PRSP) based on the World Bank development modules.

The ANDS was a five-year national development plan outlined the government strategy for achieving its long-term development vision. It was based on the Afghanistan Millennium Development Goals and the benchmarks of the Afghanistan Compact. Both the MDGs and ANDS/PRSP meant to help the government and policy makers at the national and ministry levels to plan activities for reaching the priority development results required to address people's priority needs. The I-ANDS/I-PRSP was presented at the International Donor Conference in London in 2006.

The Afghanistan National Development Strategy (ANDS), 2008-2013 served as Afghanistan's Poverty Reduction Strategy Paper (PRSP) and used the pillars, principles and benchmarks of the Afghanistan Compact (2006) as a foundation. The ANDS document was instrumental for absorbing more foreign aid for the development process of Afghanistan and presented at the Paris Conference on Afghanistan in July 2008.

In July 2007, the Boards of Executive Directors of the International Development Association (IDA) and the International Monetary Fund (IMF) agreed that the Islamic Republic of Afghanistan had met the requirements for reaching the decision point under the enhanced Heavily indebted poor countries (HIPC) initiative. The amount of debt relief determined at the decision point was US$571.4 million on March 20, 2006, net present value (NPV) terms, calculated to reduce the NPV of eligible external debt to 150 percent of exports at March 20, 2006. This relief implied a common reduction factor of 51.0 percent.

After the Paris Conference and approval of the ANDS by the boards of the World Bank and IMF in 2008, Waissi has been appointed as Director for Coordination of ANDS Implementation and Budget Policy overseeing implementation of the ANDS and its activities underlined in its National Action Plan.

=== Results Based Budgeting ===
In 2008 Waissi has been appointed as the Director for ANDS Coordination of Implementation and Budget Policy at the Ministry of Finance. In late 2008 Waissi and his team at the Ministry of Finance have introduced Results-based management (RBM) mechanism and performance budgeting into National Budget of Afghanistan for the first time between 2009 and 2011. The RBM later introduced as the Performance Budgeting at the Ministry of Finance and still continues as a budget policy tool for measuring results at the Ministry of Finance of Afghanistan.

== Environmentalism ==
=== The Green Club ===
Wahid Waissi has had a long-standing concern with environmentalism as a national and global issue. Waissi has co-founded the Green Club in 2009 together with Jawid Omar and a team of young Afghans on voluntary basis. Waissi is the chairman and co-founder of Green Club, Afghanistan on voluntary basis. The Green Club soon found its way to the heart and minds of youth activists focused its objectives to encourage environment protection and green knowledge by volunteerism, advocacy and awareness rising. In June 2012, Waissi participated at the Rio+20 United Nation Conference on Sustainable Development as member of the Government of Islamic Republic of Afghanistan delegation.

The Green Club became the first registered civil society organizations on environment protection and sustainable development. The Green Club engaged active citizens who are concerned about environmental degradation and volunteer to make the communities green.

The Green Club made its path towards Earth Day Network and owned the 2013 Earth Day International Recognition Award for its green activities. Waissi also registered a petition with the Afghan Independent Human Rights Commission and submitted the Right for Environment as future Human Rights Commission consideration for their annual analysis and reports.

The Green Club volunteers organized several campaigns namely: A Tree for Me is a Tree for Afghanistan, Earth Day Festivals, Green Club Environment Week, Green Caravans Awareness Campaigns for schools, Run for Green Cycling Contest, Green Policy, media awareness campaigns, drawing competition at selected schools, and photography competition and exhibitions in support of the Earth Day and environment protection. More than 100 youth were engaged directly in all these campaigns all at the same time.

==== A Tree for Me is a Tree for Afghanistan ====
Waissi and the Green Club volunteers have initiated the first national tree planting campaigns using the Facebook application under the title of A Tree for Me is a Tree for Afghanistan. The Green Club volunteers planted more than ten thousand trees in Kabul, Mazar-e-Sharif and Herat for five consecutive years.

==== National Environment Week ====
In 2015, Waissi and Omar have submitted a proposal to the President of the Islamic Republic of Afghanistan, Mohammad Ashraf Ghani, to localize the World Environment Day to National Environment Week based on its successful model practiced by the Green Club between years of 2010 to 2014. The Cabinet of the Islamic Republic of Afghanistan has approved this idea and included it into national calendar for annual celebration. Since 2015, the national environment week are being celebrated officially.

==== Green Policy ====
The Green Club has partnered with the CW4WAfghan to make its Green Policy a public document in the hopes that other organizations, agencies and companies operating in Afghanistan will also adopt similar policies. Afghanistan, and its capital city in particular, are facing an environmental crisis that puts millions of lives at risk, and significantly lowers the quality of life of Afghans. Despite the gravity of this crisis—which is estimated to claim far more lives than the current conflict—little is being done.

== Memberships ==
Waissi is member of Afghanistan Policy Group (APG) focusing on regional peace and stability envisioning post 2014 with other policy groups of 10 member countries. APG is part of the network of policy groups in Afghanistan, Central Asia, India and Pakistan for a regional project entitled "Envisioning a Secure and Independent Afghanistan Post 2014. Perspectives and Strategies for Constructive Conflict Resolution from the Neighborhood".

Waissi is member of Asia-Pacific Community of Practice (APCoP) on Managing for Development Results. Through APCoP, he has participated as Afghan Government representative at the Third High Level Forum on Managing for Development Results in Hanoi, Vietnam. He was also supporting for preparation of Fourth High Level Forum on New Deal Aid Effectiveness, which was held in Busan in 2011. Waissi was a fellow member and program coordinator (2012) of Afghanistan 21 Young Leaders Initiative a non-partisan and non-political group of young Afghans who shared common values and beliefs to address social, economic and political issues in Afghanistan. The AYLI fellows have managed to reflect their views and considerations about current and international affairs of Afghanistan. The AYLI fellows developed many position papers ahead of the key strategic events linked to Afghanistan i.e. Tokyo Conference on Afghanistan, 2012; Position Paper on NATO Summit in Chicago, 2012; and International Afghanistan Conference in Bonn, 2012. AYLI is being supported by Asia Society 21 Young Leaders program.

== Personal life ==
Waissi is married and has two daughters and a son.
