= Mahmoud Saikal =

Afghan diplomat and international development specialist

His Excellency Mahmoud Saikal محمود صیقل

Permanent Representative to the United Nations for Afghanistan
- In office 27 October 2015 – 19 February 2019
- Preceded by: Zahir Tanin
- Succeeded by: Adela Raz

Personal details
- Born: Kabul, Afghanistan
- Education: Deakin University, Melbourne
- Website: Permanent Representative of Afghanistan

Mahmoud Saikal (Dari: محمود صیقل) is an Afghan former senior diplomat and an international development specialist. He was the permanent representative of the Islamic Republic of Afghanistan to the United Nations from October 2015 until February 2019.

== Early life and education ==
Saikal was born and raised in the Old City of Kabul.

He graduated with a French Baccalaureate from Lycee Esteqlal, Kabul, in 1979. During the Soviet occupation of Afghanistan, Saikal left his second year at Kabul University to finish his studies in Australia. He is a graduate of University of Canberra, 1986, and University of Sydney in 1988. He also holds a master's degree in international development from Deakin University in Australia.

He is fluent in Persian, Pashto, and English, and is familiar with French and Arabic.

== Development career ==
While engaged in the development sector, Saikal served as CEO and JICA Senior Advisor for Kabul New City Development between 2008 and 2012. Prior to this, Saikal briefly worked as a World Bank Consultant, where he authored the policy paper of 'Afghanistan and Economic Regionalism' in 2010. Saikal has further worked in Kabul as UNDP International Advisor to the Afghanistan National Development Strategy in 2006–2008 (ANDS) as well as working as the President of the Commission for the Coordination of the Implementation of the Old Kabul City Plans.

Saikal began his career working in several private development firms in Australia.

== Diplomatic career ==
Saikal started his diplomatic career as the first secretary and later as counselor/chargé d'affaires at the Afghan Embassy in Tokyo, Japan, in 1993. In late 1994, he went on to serve as honorary consul of Afghanistan to Australia, until 2002 when he was appointed Ambassador of Afghanistan to Australia and New Zealand.

From 2005 to 2006, he served as Afghan Deputy Minister of Foreign Affairs. He stepped down from his position in the ministry in late 2006 to join the UNDP as an advisor on Afghanistan national development strategy. It was at this time that Saikal became a Fellow at the Asia-Pacific College of Diplomacy at the Australian National University.

Between 2012 and 2015, Saikal convened a major Track II regional process between Afghanistan and its neighbours, resulting in the Joint Declaration on Regional Peace and Stability. In 2014, Saikal was appointed Special Representative and Senior Advisor to the Chief Executive of Afghanistan.

Saikal was instrumental in the 2006 Afghanistan-NATO Declaration, which established the Framework for Enduring Cooperation in Partnership, as well as in the negotiations of the Afghanistan Compact that was presented at the London International Conference on Afghanistan in 2006. He also participated actively in the formative negotiations of the 2014 agreement of the Government of National Unity of Afghanistan.

From October 2015, Saikal served as the permanent representative of Afghanistan to the United Nations (New York). Under his leadership, Afghanistan was appointed to its first seat at the Human Rights Council (2018–2020) and became a member of the Economic and Social Council (2016–2018). Saikal was the chair of the UN General Assembly Third Committee 73rd Session. He was also the deputy vice chair of the Committee on the Exercise of the Inalienable Rights of the Palestinian People. He served as vice president of the 72nd session of the UN General Assembly and chaired the New York consultations with UN member states on the Global Compact on Refugees.

Saikal's efforts in the promotion of regional cooperation resulted in Afghanistan's membership in South Asian Association for Regional Cooperation (SAARC) and Central Asia Regional Economic Cooperation (CAREC). Saikal was also instrumental in the formulation of the process of Regional Economic Cooperation Conferences on Afghanistan (RECCA) has strengthened Afghanistan's membership in Economic Cooperation Organization.

Saikal's term ended on 19 February 2019 and he was succeeded by Afghanistan's first female UN Ambassador, Adela Raz.

== Awards ==
Saikal was the recipient of a "First Class Merit Award" from the President of Afghanistan in April 2004, as well as "Best Ambassador Award" from the Minister of Foreign Affairs in March 2003.

== Personal life ==
Saikal has interest in literature, art, poetry and music. A collection of his early Dari poems has been published in Kabul under the title of "The Polishing of the Hearts".
