= Embassy without a government =

Type of embassy

An embassy without a government is a diplomatic mission that represents a deposed government to its host country. Such a mission usually arises from a civil conflict that leads to a regime change from an internationally recognised government to one or more new governments that may or may not be recognised when established for a variety of reasons.

== Russia (1917–1925) ==
After the February Revolution, then People's Commissar Leon Trotsky dismissed the diplomatic corps of the Russian Republic. With the outbreak of the Russian Civil War, the Tsarist-aligned corps continued to operate in support of the Russian Provisional Government, working with the governments of Alexander Kolchak, Anton Denikin and Pyotr Wrangel.

In October 1917, Vasily Maklakov was appointed to replace Alexander Izvolsky as Ambassador to France. When he arrived in Paris to present his credentials, Maklakov learned of the Bolshevik takeover (October Revolution) and he represented a no longer existent government. In December was put out of charge by Trotsky but nevertheless continued to occupy the Russian embassy for seven years. Hôtel d'Estrées served as the informal headquarters of the White émigré, the anti-Bolsheviks.

Throughout that period, French authorities considered Maklakov "an ambassador who had not yet been accredited". There was considerable ambiguity in this position. For example, he once received a letter from Premier Clemenceau addressed to "Son Excellence Monsieur Maklakoff, Ambassade de Russie", with the lightly erased letters "ur" at the end of "Ambassade". Maklakov lightly compared himself to "a magazine that one puts on a seat to show that it is occupied".

With the Tsarist government deposed, Konstantin Nabokov (ambassador in London) and Maklakov telegrammed their counterparts in Rome and Washington, urging them of the necessity of coordinating their actions in response to the events in Petrograd. Maklakov, a judge, deemed that the Soviet government was illegitimate in the way it violently seized power, and was hopeful that "vigorous opposition" would be stirred up in the country. The day after the revolution, the mission in Copenhagen, headed by chargé d'affaires Mikhail Meyendorff, circulated a wire to Russian missions in the allied and neutral countries of Europe, asking advise regarding coordination efforts. On November 10 (O.S. October 28), the ambassador in Rome, Mikhail Giers, endorsed Maklakov's actions. On the other hand, Boris Bakhmeteff, ambassador to the United States, took a more sympathetic approach stance to the U.S.'s position towards the war.

Ultimately, most diplomats agreed with Nabokov, and diplomatic efforts became coordinated and based in Paris at the suggestion of chargé d'affaires in Madrid, Yury Solovyov. The embassies acted as parallel representatives of Russia to other countries, competing with the newly established Soviet Union for diplomatic recognition. Among these were consuls in seven U.S. cities and three Canadian cities, receiving financing and support from the U.S. government, as well as ambassadors and other representatives in Europe and Japan.

The ambassadors worked under the notion proposed by the ambassador to Siam, Iosif Loris-Melikov: the lack of a legitimate government meant that they could not resign, and that such an action would serve as an implicit recognition of the Soviet government. Thus, the tsarist politicians would serve as representatives of Russia until a new legitimate government was established, participating in events such as the 18th Inter-Allied Conference held in Paris in late 1917. Financing took place through loans to local missions by the host countries' governments, and the embassy's accounts were drained into temporary accounts or used to buy war bonds in order to prevent that the money is used by the Soviet government in the event that the missions closed.

After being reminded of the council's actions, Trotsky issued a telegram on November 30, 1917 (O.S. November 17) that deposed Maklakov of all diplomatic functions. Another telegram on the same day stating that the Council of People's Commissars suggested that all embassy staff respond immediately as to whether or not they were to follow a foreign policy that aligned with the Congress of Soviets. The telegram went unanswered, with the exception of Solovyov in Madrid and Ungern-Sternberg in Lisbon, who were boycotted by the council and allied diplomats, and as a result, another telegram was issued on December 9 (O.S. November 26) relieving 28 diplomats of their duties without a right to a pension.

In late November (O.S. October) 1917, the "Council of Ambassadors" (Russian: Совещания послов) was established to ensure unanimity among the tsarist diplomats. It included diplomats Giers (Italy), Nabokov (United Kingdom), Stakhovich (Spain) and Efremov (Switzerland). Maklakov acted as the council's leader, followed by Giers. A number of diplomats remained active up until 1940 without having any contact with the council, as was the case of Yevgeny Shtein (Buenos Aires; to 1931), Pavel Pustoshkin (The Hague; to 1940) and S. A. Uget (Washington D.C.; to 1933).

Incidents took place between tsarist and bolshevik diplomats. One such event took place in Bern, when Andrei Mikhailovich Onu, the tsarist ambassador to Switzerland, refused to hand over his mission to Soviet ambassador Jan Antonovich Berzin, demanding that the Swiss government recognise his embassy as the only legitimate mission to the country. A similar situation took place in London, with the Soviet ambassador being unable to occupy the embassy due to the British government siding with the tsarists.

Between 1920 and 1925, the council slowly started to fade as the USSR was recognised instead, representing instead the émigré movement instead of a Russian state. For example, after the signing of the Treaty of Rapallo, the German mission was renamed to the Russian Refugee Organization. Tsarist diplomats were allowed to attend the Paris Peace Conference, but not at an official capacity. The council ultimately did not survive past the early 1920s.

The consuls in North America stopped their services in the late 1920s; the U.S. government seized the records of the consulates. The seizure started a long dispute. The National Archives and Records Administration received the documents in 1949. In 1980 the U.S. government loaned the documents of the Canadian consulates to the Library and Archives Canada. On 31 January 1990 the U.S. returned the documents to the Soviet Union and kept the microfilms as evidence.

=== Diplomatic missions after 1917 ===
Host country	Host city	Mission	End	Ref.
Argentina	Buenos Aires	Mission	1931	
Bulgaria	Sofia	Mission	1923	
Canada	Ottawa	Embassy	1920s	
China	Beijing	Embassy	1920	
China	Shanghai	Consulate	1920	
France	Paris	Embassy	1924	
Japan	Tokyo	Embassy	1925	
Switzerland	Bern	Embassy	1922	
United Kingdom	London	Embassy	1924	
United States	Washington, D.C.	Embassy	1922	

=== Dissolution of the Soviet Union ===
A similar situation occurred very briefly as part of the dissolution of the Soviet Union; between 16–24 December 1991, the Soviet Union neither controlled nor claimed to control any territory (thus making it a government-in-exile), but embassies and the United Nations still recognized the Soviet Union instead of Russia. The United Nations would recognize Russia in place of the Soviet Union on 24 December 1991 (two days before the official dissolution of the Soviet Union), and the embassies would follow suit.

== Spain (1939–1977) ==
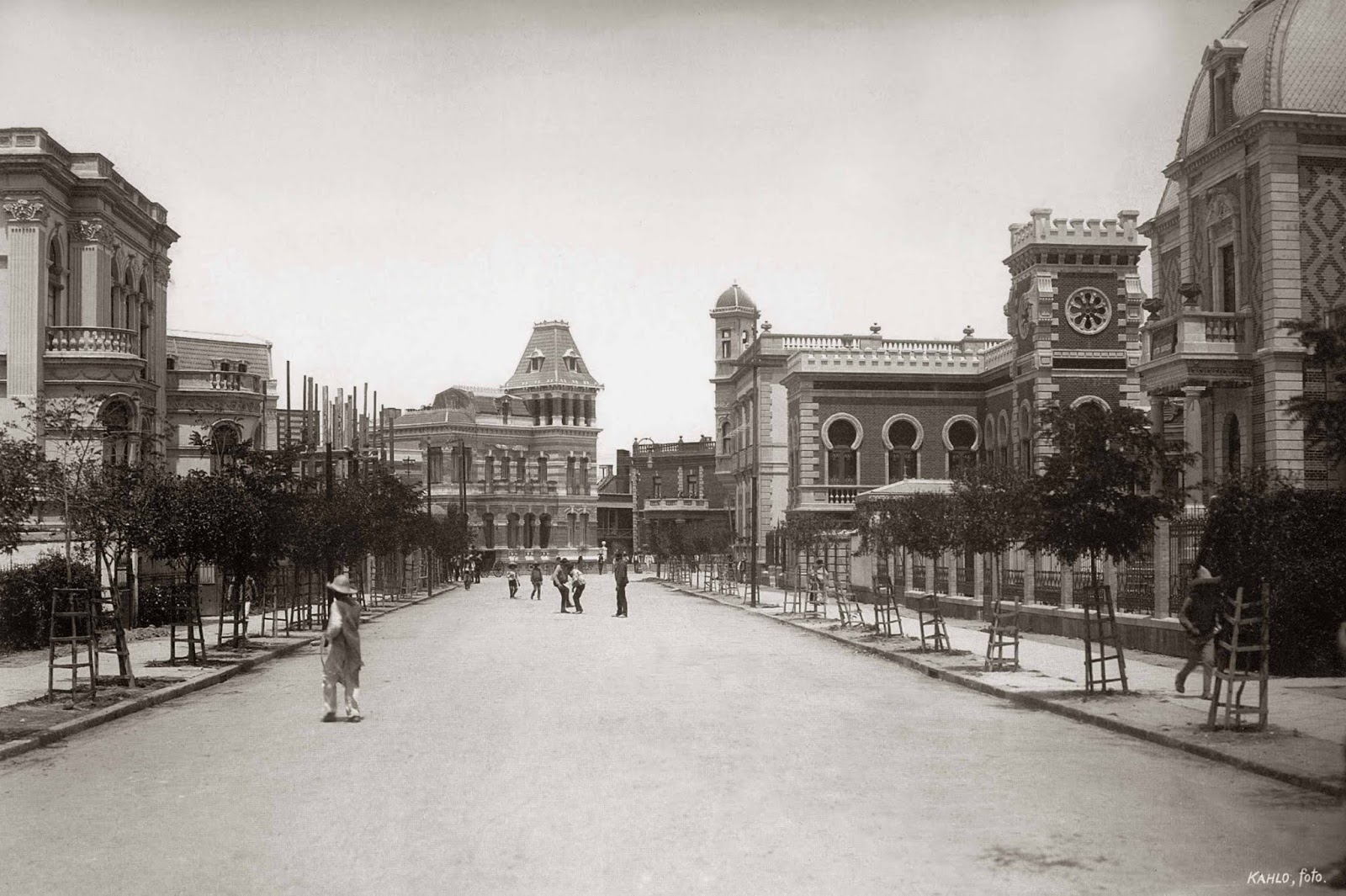
Calle Londres in Colonia Juárez, Mexico City. The building on the left served as the Republican embassy until the Spanish transition.

After the victory of the Nationalist faction of the Spanish Civil War on April 1, 1939, the Republican government established a government-in-exile on April 4. In the immediate postwar period, it had diplomatic relations with Mexico, Panama, Guatemala, Venezuela, Poland, Czechoslovakia, Hungary, Yugoslavia, Romania, and Albania, but the United States, the United Kingdom, France and the Soviet Union did not recognise it.

As more countries established relations with the new Spanish government, the number diminished. By the time it was dissolved in 1977 following the Spanish transition to democracy, it had relations and embassies only with Mexico and Yugoslavia.

=== Diplomatic missions after 1939 ===
Host country	Host city	Mission	End	Ref.
Mexico	Mexico City	Embassy	1977	
Yugoslavia	Belgrade	Embassy	1977	

== Poland (1939–1990) ==
The Polish government-in-exile operated from September 1939 to December 1990. During World War II, the embassy in London was administered by the government-in-exile until the United Kingdom recognized the Polish People's Republic after the Yalta Conference, forcing the government out of the embassy and into the president's private residence at 43 Eaton Place. In Spain, the government was recognised in 1939 and the embassy was allowed to remain open for the entirety of the war. An Honorary Consulate in Barcelona organized temporary accommodation, false documents and transport for Polish civilians and military who fled from France to Spain in 1939–1942 with the intention of reaching the United Kingdom.

=== Diplomatic missions after 1939 ===
Host country	Host city	Mission	End	Ref.
Spain	Madrid	Embassy	1968	
United Kingdom	London	Embassy	1945	

== Lithuania, Latvia, Estonia (1940–1991) ==
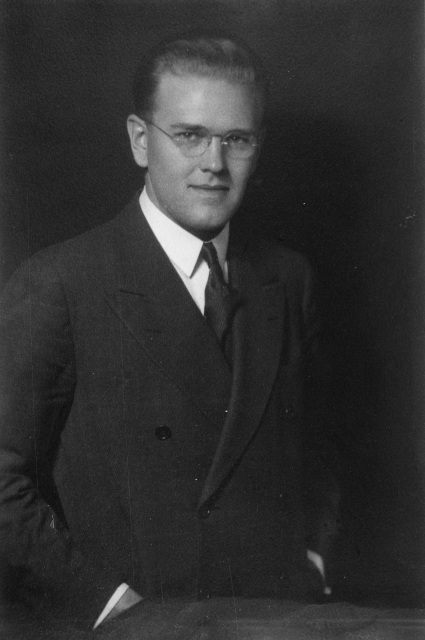
Ambassador Ernst Jaakson is the longest-serving diplomat in history, his main contribution was to maintain the legal state continuity of Estonia with his uninterrupted diplomatic service over 69 years (1929–1998), outliving the period of the Soviet occupation of Estonia (1944–1991).

During World War II the three Baltic countries – Estonia, Latvia and Lithuania – were invaded by the USSR in June 1940, subsequently illegally annexed into the Soviet Union, and after the war under Soviet occupation until the three countries were able to restore independence in August 1991. During this period (1940-1991) the Estonian Diplomatic Service, the Latvian diplomatic service in exile, and The Lithuanian Diplomatic Service all maintained a network of diplomatic missions in the United States and several other western countries.

They continued to be recognised as the diplomatic representatives of the independent states of Estonia, Latvia and Lithuania, whose annexation by the Soviet Union was not recognised by the United States, the United Kingdom, France, the Holy See, and several other countries and international organisations, including the European Parliament.

After the occupation of the Baltic countries in 1940, Joseph Stalin and the Soviet government attempted to have the Baltic diplomatic missions turned over and the diplomatic representatives return home. Draconian laws were promulgated in 1940 to induce compliance; the diplomats who refused to return were declared outlaws with the penalty of death by shooting within 24 hours of their capture. Almost all of the Baltic diplomats refused to return to their Soviet-occupied homeland. As representatives of the three national governments which were not able to operate in their respective homelands, or no longer existed, the ambassadors and consuls of the Baltic countries maintained diplomatic contacts with Washington and other capitals, as well as helping the Baltic citizens in the West by handing out passports, when needed, and providing other consular services to exiled citizens of Estonia, Latvia and Lithuania from 1940 to 1991.

== Afghanistan (2021–present) ==
Diplomatic missions of Afghanistan Afghanistan Afghan embassies aligned with the Islamic Republic of Afghanistan Afghan embassies aligned with the Islamic Emirate of Afghanistan (Taliban) Sovereignty not recognized by Afghanistan

After the collapse of the Islamic Republic of Afghanistan that ended with the capture of Kabul by the Taliban on August 15, 2021, the country's diplomatic network abroad continued its allegiance to the former Republic, as a number of the diplomats posted had personally contributed to the country's reconstruction after 2001. Efforts made by the corps, now reduced in staff size and financed by donors and consular activities alone, have been mostly focused on Western countries, as several Afghan missions in Asia have been handed over to the Taliban.

In the absence of a foreign ministry, a Coordination Group was established by the republican ambassadors in order to coordinate efforts via mostly online meetings, and a Council of Ambassadors currently acts as the embassies' government system.

Incidents have occurred between republican and emirian diplomats, as was the case in Rome, where the police were called after a physical altercation between the ambassadors. A number of diplomats of the new government have also been denied their positions, as was the case of Suhail Shaheen, who was nominated as envoy to the United Nations, but declined by the organisation.

=== Diplomatic missions after 2021 ===
Host country	Host city	Mission	Transf.	Ref.
Africa
Egypt	Cairo	Embassy	2025	
Americas
Canada	Ottawa	Embassy	No	
United States	Washington, D.C.	Embassy	Closed	
Asia
Azerbaijan	Baku	Embassy	2025	
Bangladesh	Dhaka	Embassy	No	
China	Beijing	Embassy	2022	
India	New Delhi	Embassy	2023	
India	Hyderabad	Consulate-General	2023	
India	Mumbai	Consulate-General	2023	
Iran	Tehran	Embassy	2023	
Iran	Mashad	Consulate-General	2023	
Iran	Zahedan	Consulate-General	2023	
Iraq	Baghdad	Embassy	2025	
Japan	Tokyo	Embassy	Closed	
Jordan	Amman	Embassy	Closed	
Kazakhstan	Astana	Embassy	2023	
Kuwait	Kuwait City	Embassy	2026	
Kyrgyzstan	Bishkek	Embassy	2024	
Malaysia	Kuala Lumpur	Embassy	2024	
Oman	Muscat	Embassy	2024	
Pakistan	Islamabad	Embassy	2021	
Pakistan	Karachi	Consulate-General	2021	
Pakistan	Peshawar	Consulate-General	2021	
Pakistan	Quetta	Consulate-General	2021	
Qatar	Doha	Embassy	2021	
Saudi Arabia	Riyadh	Embassy	unofficially	(Note: Suhail Shaheen has claimed Islamic Republic-appointed diplomats to Saudi Arabia are following instructions from the Islamic Emirate's Ministry of Foreign Affairs.)
Saudi Arabia	Jeddah	Consulate-General	No	
South Korea	Seoul	Embassy	No	
Tajikistan	Dushanbe	Embassy	No	
Tajikistan	Khorog	Consulate-General	No	
Turkey	Ankara	Embassy	2025	
Turkey	Istanbul	Consulate-General	2025	
Turkmenistan	Ashgabat	Embassy	2022	
Turkmenistan	Mary	Consulate-General	2022	
United Arab Emirates	Abu Dhabi	Embassy	2024	
United Arab Emirates	Dubai	Consulate-General	2023	
Uzbekistan	Tashkent	Embassy	2024	
Uzbekistan	Termez	Consulate-General	2023	
Europe
Austria	Vienna	Embassy	No	
Belgium	Brussels	Embassy	No	
Bulgaria	Sofia	Embassy	No	
Czech Republic	Prague	Embassy	No	
France	Paris	Embassy	No	
Germany	Berlin	Embassy	unofficially	
Germany	Bonn	Consulate-General	unofficially	
Germany	Munich	Consulate-General	unofficially	
Greece	Athens	Embassy	No	
Italy	Rome	Embassy	No	
Netherlands	The Hague	Embassy	No	
Norway	Oslo	Embassy	2025	
Poland	Warsaw	Embassy	No	
Russia	Moscow	Embassy	2022	
Spain	Madrid	Embassy	No	
Sweden	Stockholm	Embassy	No	
Switzerland	Geneva	Embassy	No	
Ukraine	Kyiv	Embassy	No	
United Kingdom	London	Embassy	Closed	
Oceania
Australia	Canberra	Embassy	No	
International Organizations
United Nations	New York City	Permanent Mission	No	
United Nations	Geneva	Permanent Mission	No	
UNESCO	Paris	Permanent Delegation	No	

== See also ==
- Government-in-exile
- Civil war
- De facto embassy
