= List of diplomatic missions of Afghanistan =

Diplomatic missions of Afghanistan Afghanistan Embassies or consulates aligned with the Emirate Embassies or consulates unofficially cooperating with the Emirate Embassies or consulates aligned with the Republic Sovereignty not recognized by Afghanistan (Israel and Taiwan) (Note: Taiwanese passports are accepted for travel to Afghanistan, while Israeli passports are not. See Visa policy of Afghanistan)

The operation of Afghanistan's foreign diplomatic missions has been in a transitional phase since the Taliban's August 2021 takeover of the government by force. The takeover was widely condemned by the international community, and no country except Russia has recognized the Taliban government, officially called the Islamic Emirate of Afghanistan. Despite not recognizing the new regime, some countries have handed over control of the Afghan diplomatic missions in their countries by allowing the Taliban to appoint representatives at the chargé d'affaires level. In December 2023, China became the first country to accredit a Taliban-appointed ambassador.

Most embassies set up by the former internationally-recognized regime, the Islamic Republic of Afghanistan, have continued to operate independently since the 2021 collapse of their government. In the absence of a government-in-exile, some have been coordinating policy with each other directly. The Taliban has been aggressively pursuing control of these missions through both diplomatic efforts and harassment campaigns targeted at currently serving diplomats with the aim of them stepping aside. They have had limited success. Initially, the Taliban continued accepting documents issued by any mission, though this policy was revoked in 2024.

== Islamic Emirate of Afghanistan ==
Only Russia has recognized the Islamic Emirate of Afghanistan as the legitimate successor to the Islamic Republic of Afghanistan. However, many other countries have handed control of Afghan embassies and consulates to the Taliban, either by accepting temporary representatives or receiving permanent ambassadors, and many of those countries have allowed the missions to operate under the name "Islamic Emirate of Afghanistan" and display the Taliban flag.

=== Asia ===
- Azerbaijan
  - Baku (Embassy)
    Accredited to Georgia
- Bangladesh
  - Dhaka (Embassy)
- China
  - Beijing (Embassy)
    Accredited to Mongolia and Nicaragua
- Indonesia
  - Jakarta (Embassy)
- India
  - New Delhi (Embassy)
    Accredited to Bhutan and Nepal
  - Hyderabad (Consulate-General)
  - Mumbai (Consulate-General)
- Iran
  - Teheran (Embassy)
  - Mashad (Consulate-General)
  - Zahedan (Consulate-General)
- Iraq
  - Baghdad (Embassy)
- Kazakhstan
  - Astana (Embassy)
- Kyrgyzstan
  - Bishkek (Embassy)
- Kuwait
  - Kuwait City (Embassy)
- Pakistan
  - Islamabad (Embassy)
  - Karachi (Consulate-General)
  - Peshawar (Consulate-General)
  - Quetta (Consulate-General)
- Malaysia
  - Kuala Lumpur (Embassy)
- Oman
  - Muscat (Embassy)
- Qatar
  - Doha (Embassy)
- Tajikistan
  - Khorog (Consulate-General)
- Turkmenistan
  - Ashgabat (Embassy)
  - Mary (Consulate-General)
- United Arab Emirates
  - Abu Dhabi (Embassy)
  - Dubai (Consulate-General)
- Uzbekistan
  - Tashkent (Embassy)
  - Termez (Consulate-General)

=== Africa ===
- Egypt
  - Cairo (Embassy)

=== Europe ===
- Norway
  - Oslo (Embassy)
    Accredited to Denmark, Iceland
- Russia
  - Moscow (Embassy)
    Accredited to Belarus and Armenia
- Turkey
  - Ankara (Embassy)
  - Istanbul (Consulate-General)

== Islamic Republic of Afghanistan ==
Since 2024, documents including passports and visas issued by these missions, except the embassies in the Netherlands, Spain, Bulgaria, and the Czech Republic and the consulate in Munich, which are run by Islamic Republic-appointed diplomats but cooperate with the Taliban in providing consular services, are not accepted in Afghanistan. Those who previously entered on a visa issued by an unapproved mission are allowed to stay but may not re-enter without a new visa.

=== Americas ===
- Canada
  - Ottawa (Embassy)
  - Toronto (Consulate-General)
  - Vancouver (Consulate-General)

=== Asia ===
- South Korea
  - Seoul (Embassy)
- Tajikistan
  - Dushanbe (Embassy)

=== Europe ===
- Austria
  - Vienna (Embassy)
- Belgium
  - Brussels (Embassy)
- France
  - Paris (Embassy)
- Greece
  - Athens (Embassy)
- Italy
  - Rome (Embassy)
- Poland
  - Warsaw (Embassy)
    Accredited to Romania, Lithuania, Latvia, and Estonia
- Sweden
  - Stockholm (Embassy)
    Accredited to Finland
- Switzerland
  - Geneva (Embassy)
- Ukraine
  - Kyiv (Embassy)
    Accredited to Moldova

=== Closed missions ===
The missions in the U.S. were the first to close in the aftermath of the Taliban takeover, in March 2022.

- United States
  - Washington, D.C. (Embassy)
    Accredited to Argentina, Brazil, Colombia, the Dominican Republic, and Mexico
  - Los Angeles (Consulate-General)
  - New York City (Consulate-General)
- Sri Lanka
  - Colombo (Embassy)
- United Kingdom
  - London (Embassy)
- Jordan
  - Amman (Embassy)
- Japan
  - Tokyo (Embassy)
    Accredited to the Philippines and Singapore
    Mongolia (Embassy) (1980-1992)
- Australia
  - Canberra (Embassy)
    Accredited to New Zealand and Fiji

=== Multilateral organisations ===
- Brussels (permanent representation to the European Union and NATO)
- The Hague (permanent representation to the OPCW)
- Geneva (Permanent Mission to the United Nations Office)
- New York City (Permanent Mission to the United Nations Office)
- Paris (Permanent Mission to UNESCO)

== Unofficial affiliation with the Islamic Emirate of Afghanistan ==
=== Asia ===
- Saudi Arabia (Note: Suhail Shaheen has claimed Islamic Republic-appointed diplomats to Saudi Arabia are following instructions from the Islamic Emirate's Ministry of Foreign Affairs.)
  - Riyadh (Embassy)
  - Jeddah (Consulate-General)

=== Europe ===
- Bulgaria
  - Sofia (Embassy) (Note: The embassy in Bulgaria cooperates with the Taliban government in providing consular services.)
- Czech Republic
  - Prague (Embassy) (Note: The embassy in the Czech Republic cooperates with the Taliban government in providing consular services.)
- Germany
  - Berlin (Embassy)
    The embassy is controlled by diplomats from the Taliban. The German Federal Foreign Office told them to keep the old symbols.
  - Bonn (Consulate-General)
    While the German Federal Foreign Office claims the embassy is led by diplomats send prior to 2021, there are press claims it is actually led by two diplomats from the Taliban: Said Mustafa Hashimi and a colleague, who were officially accredited in July 2025.
  - Munich (Consulate-General) (Note: The consulate in Munich cooperates with the Taliban government in providing consular services. Zabihullah Mujahid declared that the Consulate-General is adhering to the Islamic Emirate and its jurisdiction was expanded to all of Germany.)
- Netherlands
  - The Hague (Embassy) (Note: The embassy in the Netherlands cooperates with the Taliban government in providing consular services.)
- Spain
  - Madrid (Embassy) (Note: The embassy in Spain cooperates with the Taliban government in providing consular services.)

== Gallery ==
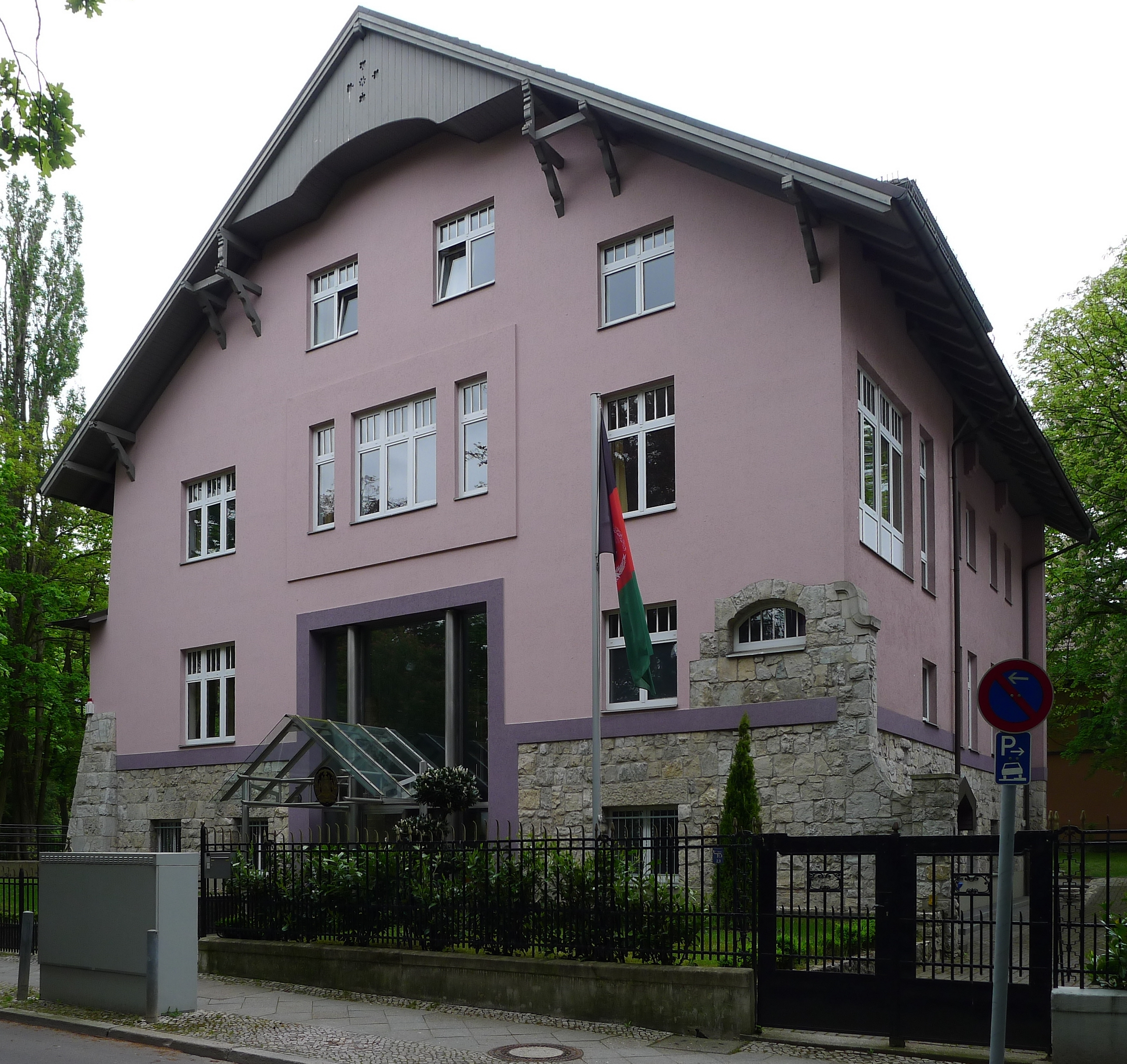
Embassy in Berlin

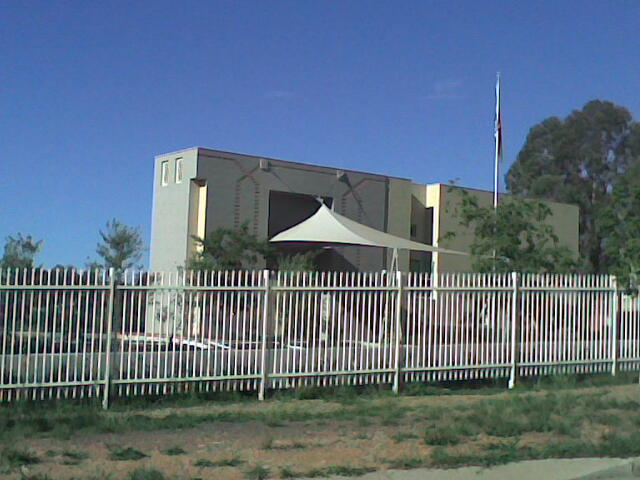
Embassy in Canberra

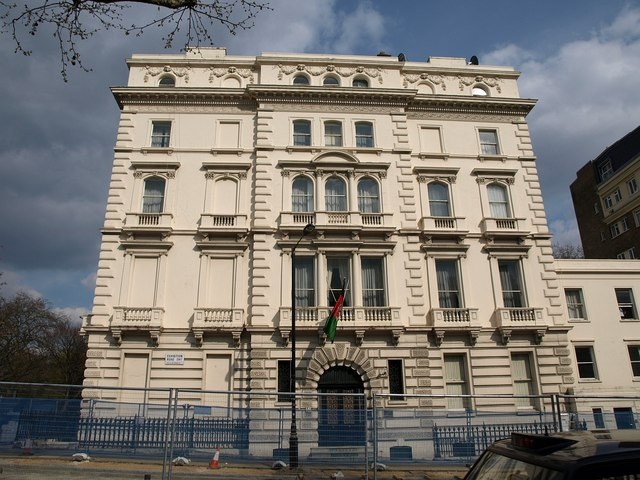
Embassy in London
(closed since September 2024)

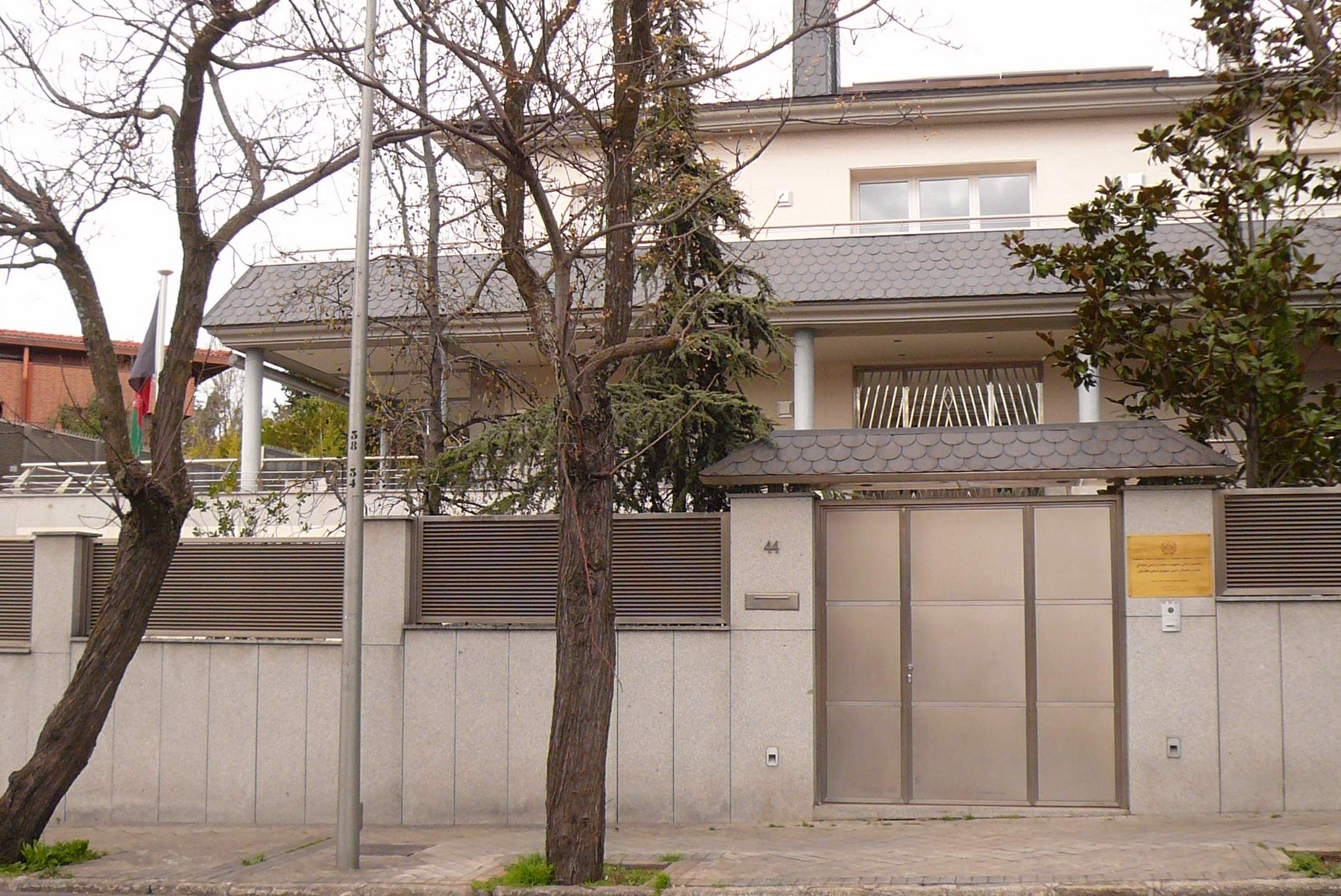
Embassy in Madrid

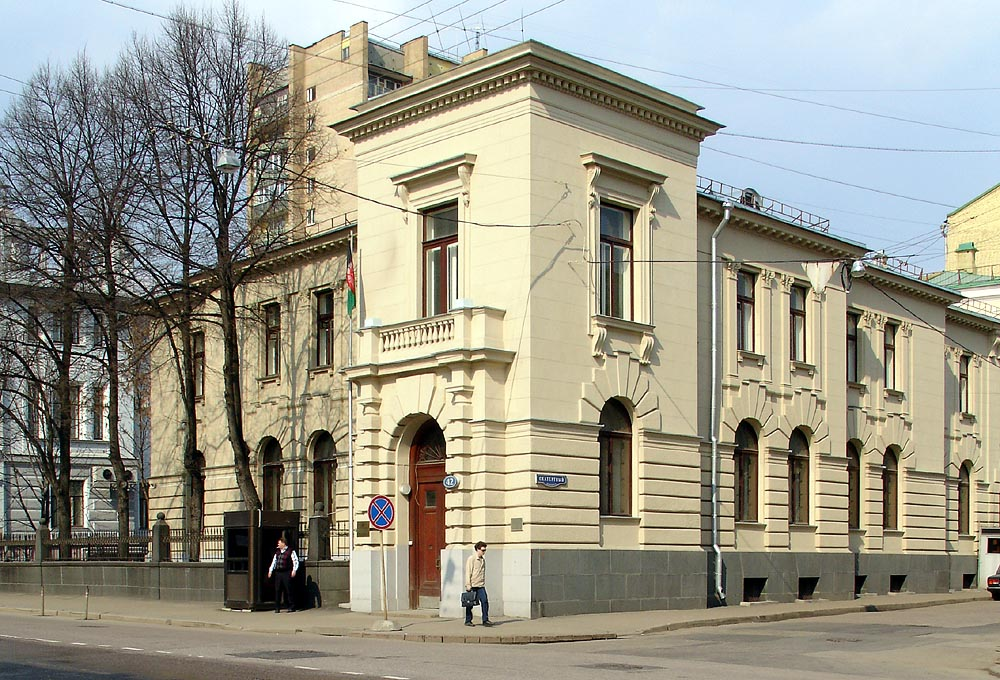
Embassy in Moscow

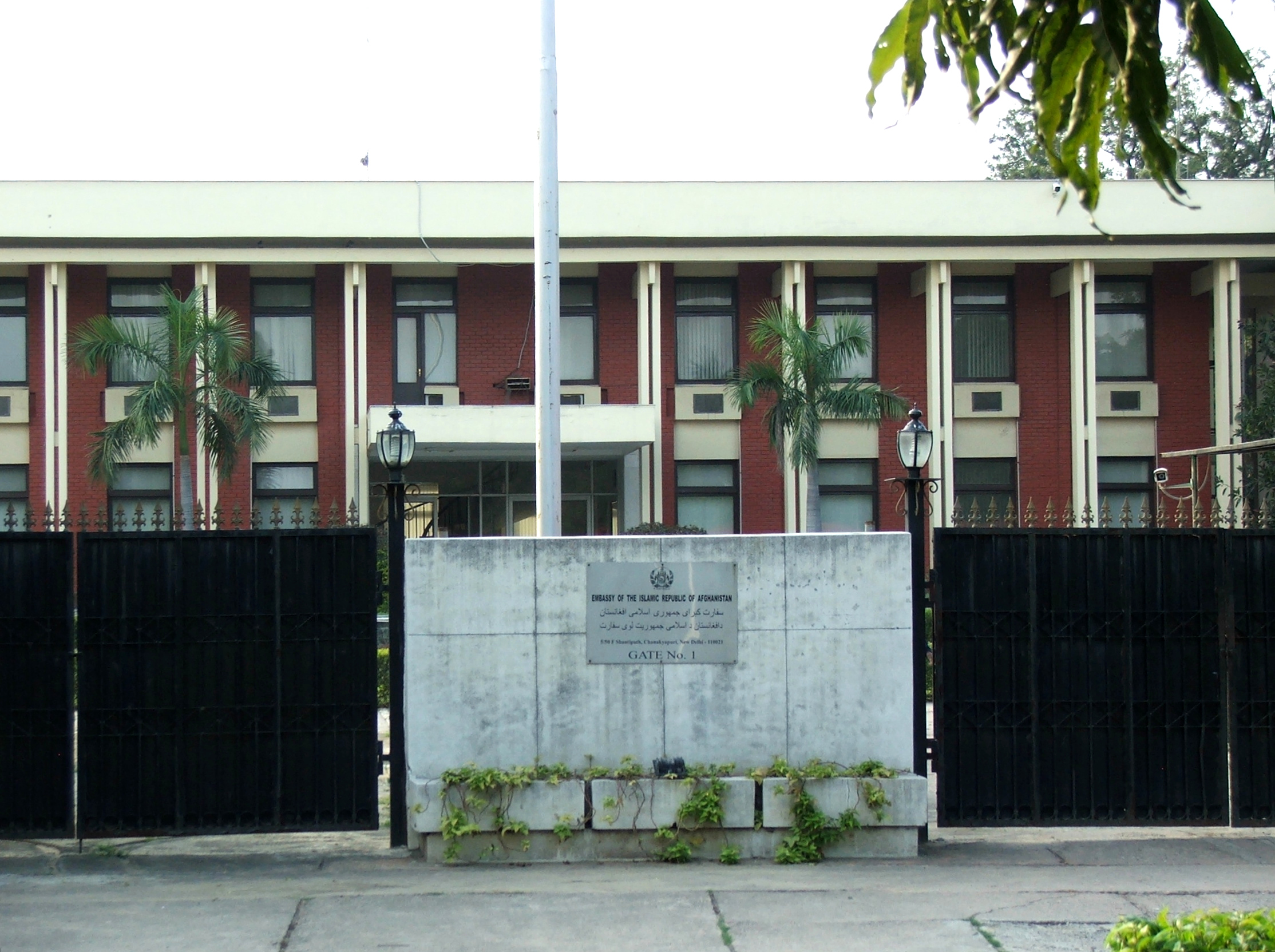
Embassy in New Delhi

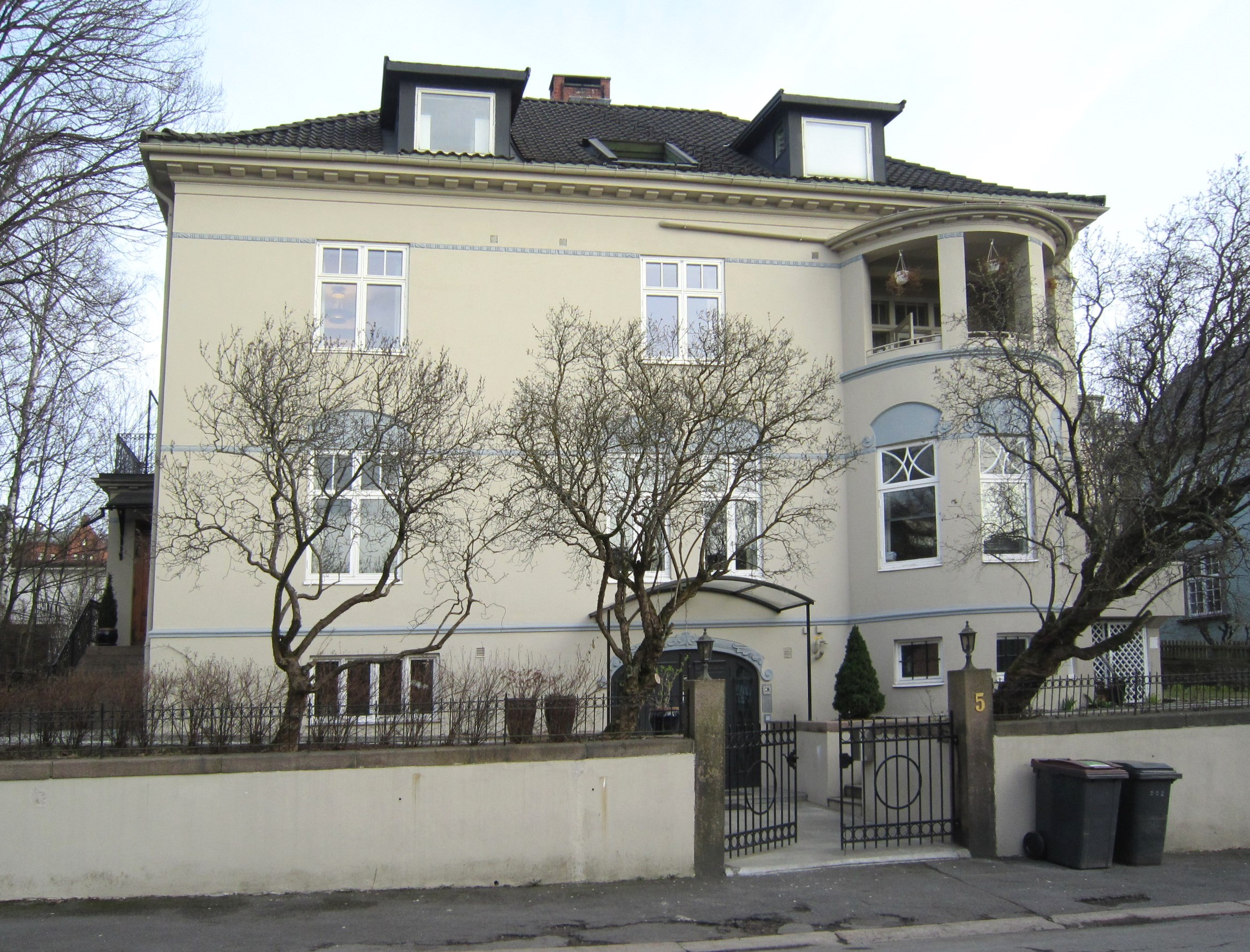
Embassy in Oslo

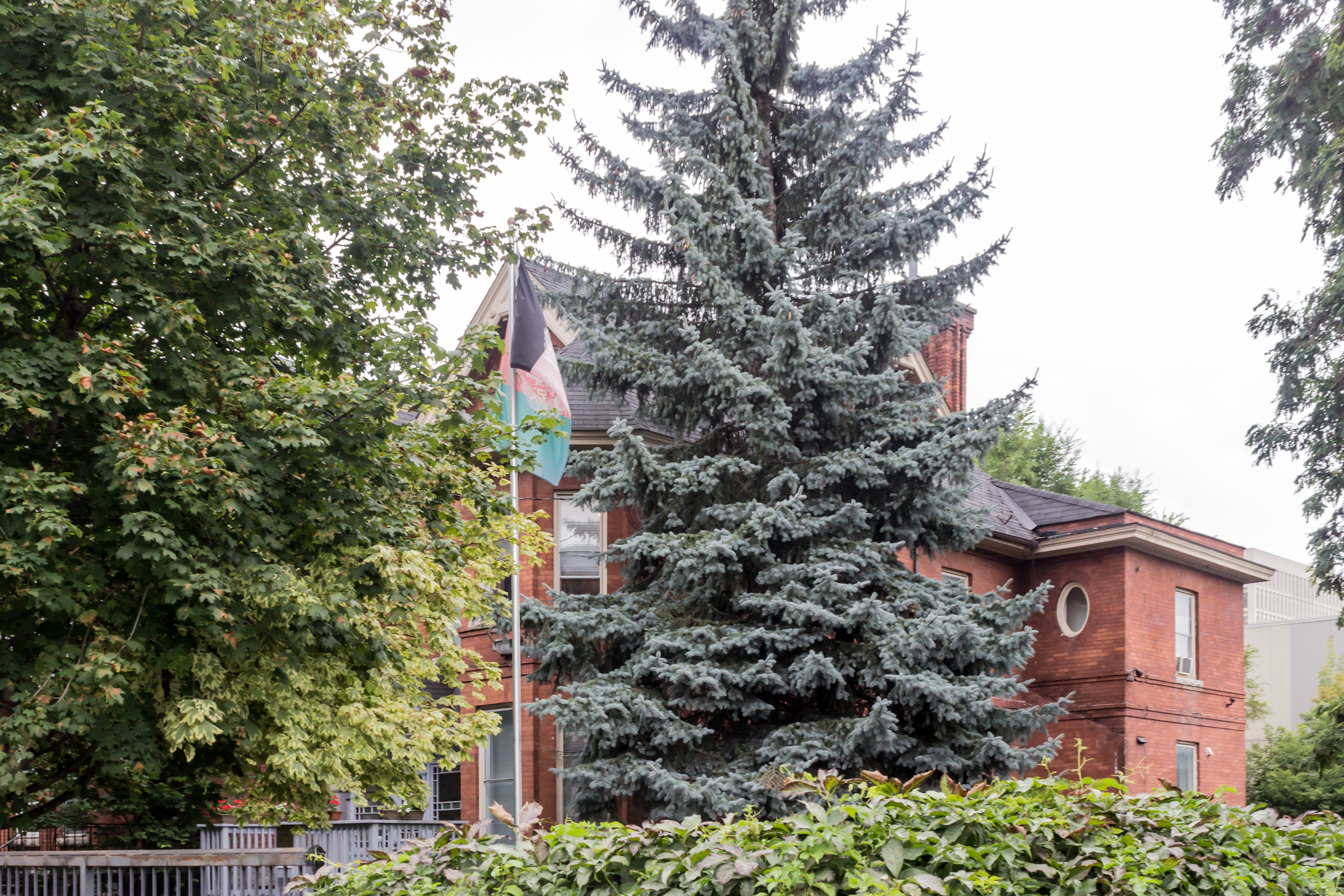
Embassy in Ottawa

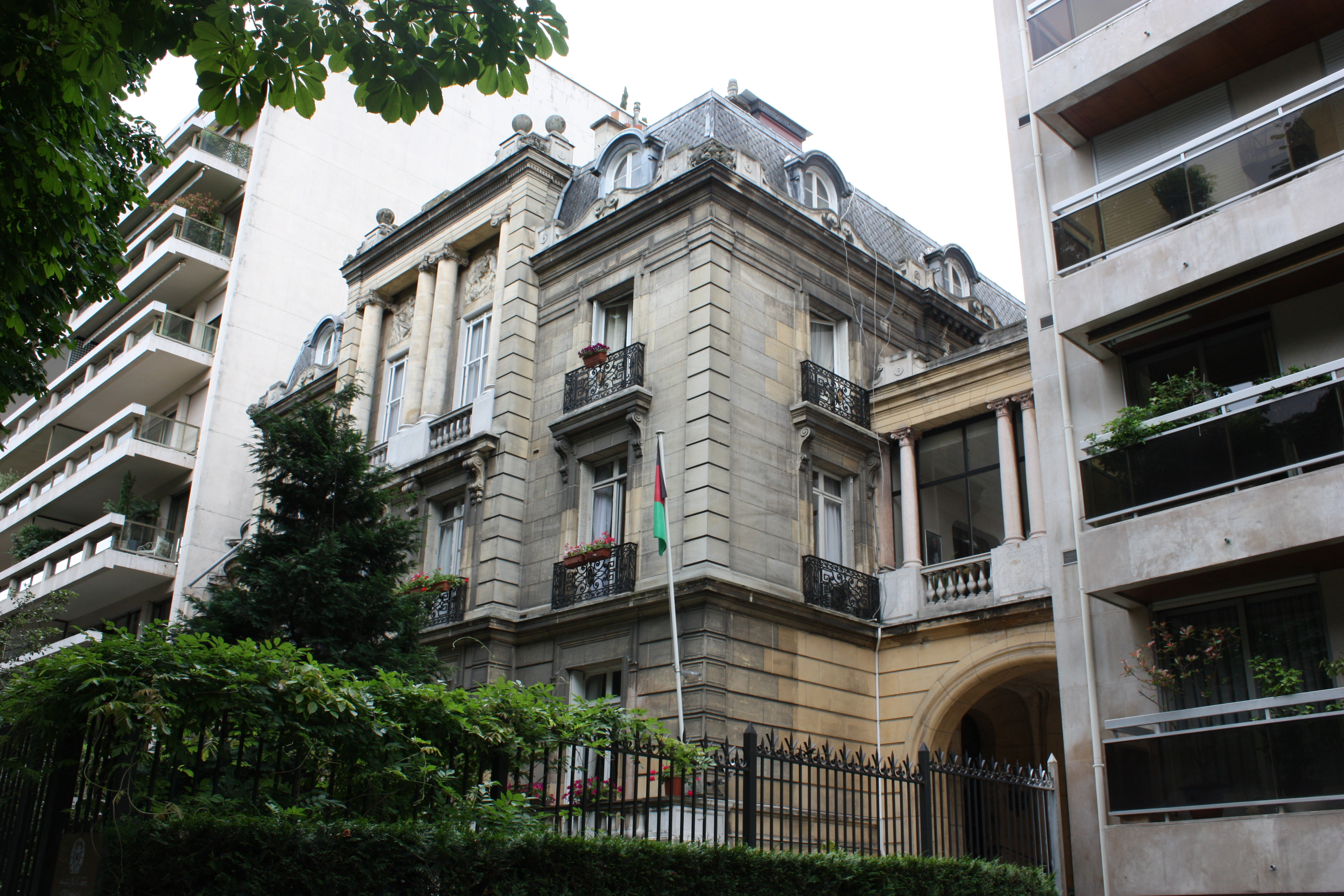
Embassy in Paris

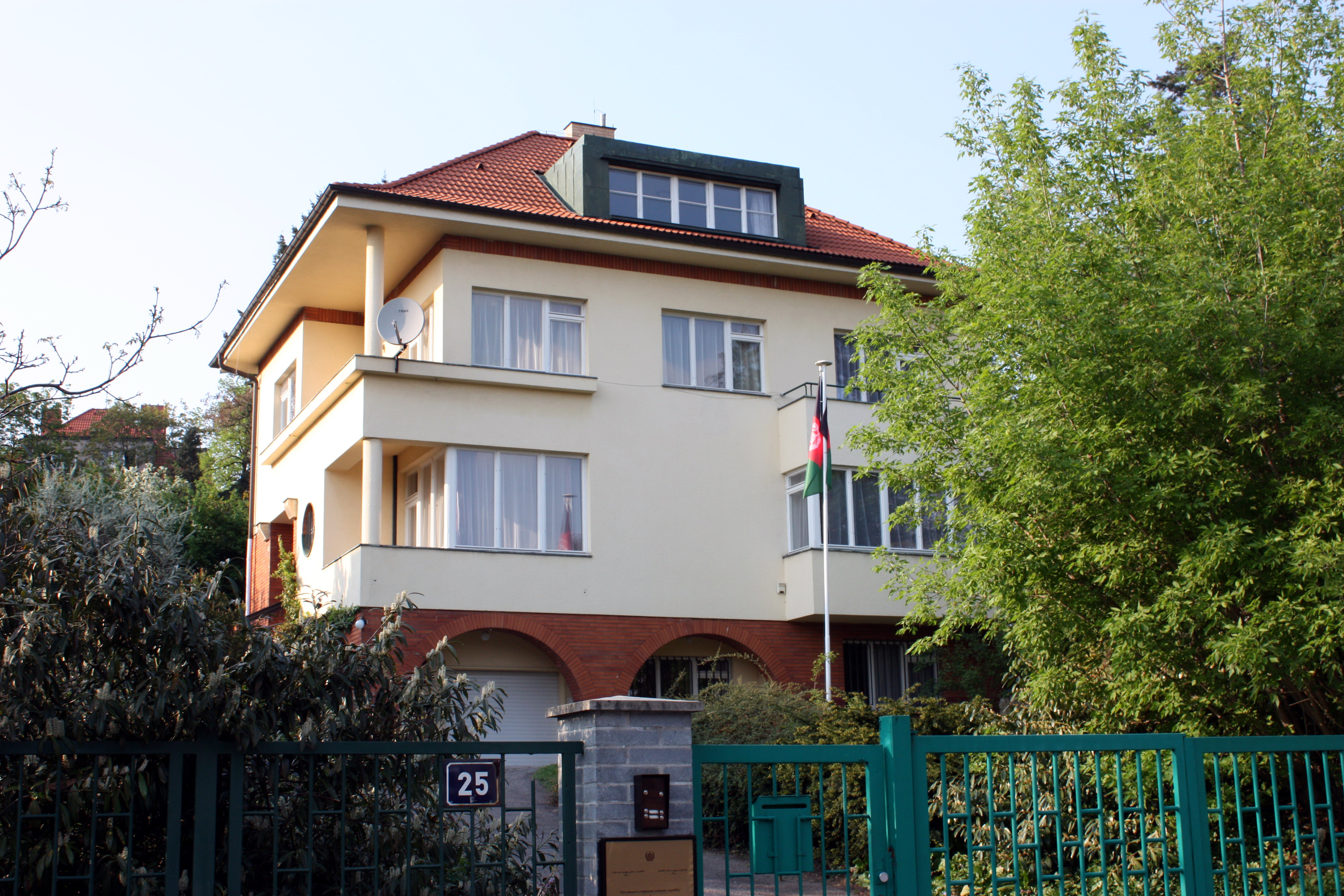
Embassy in Prague

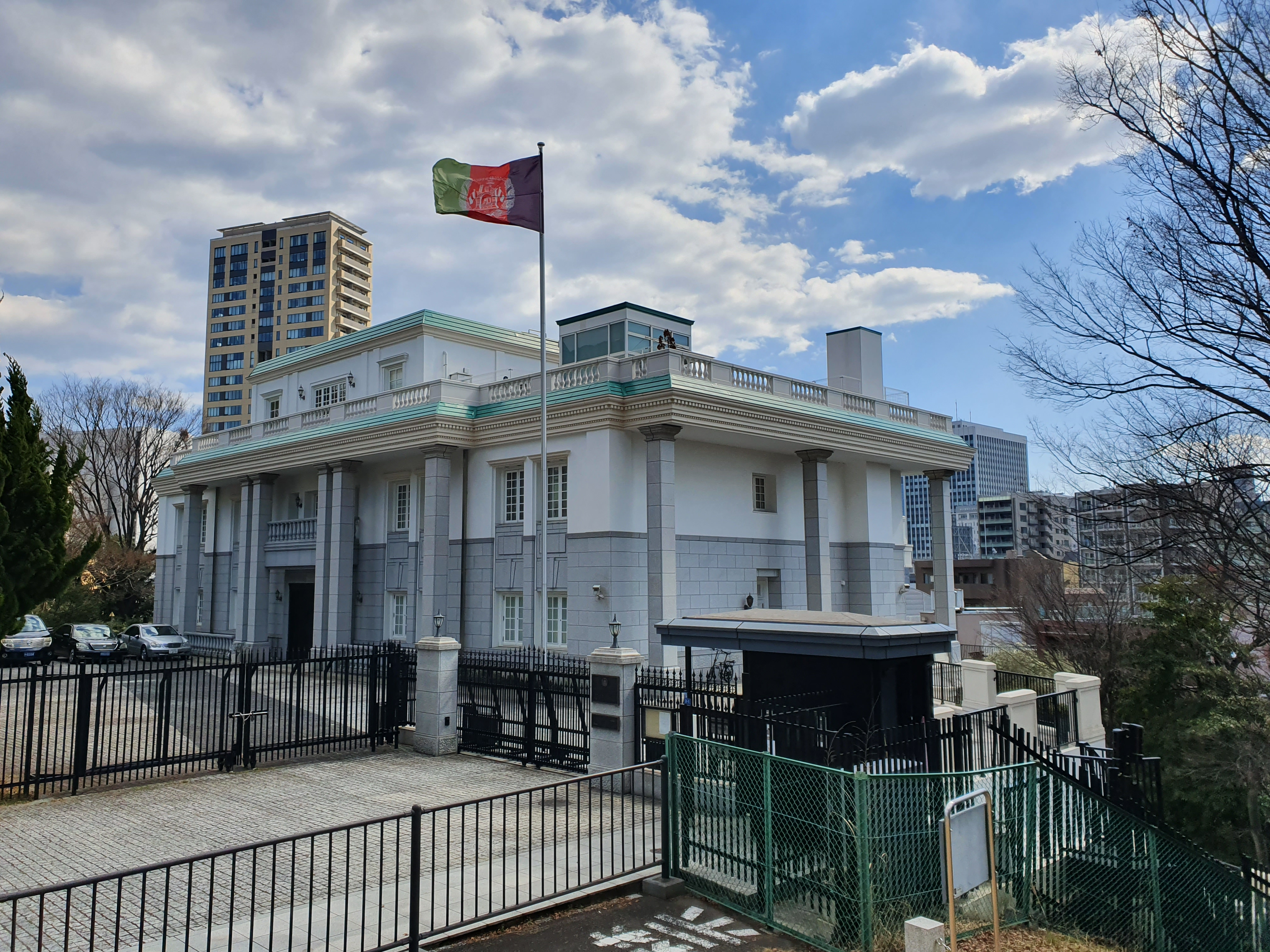
Embassy in Tokyo
(closed since 1 February 2026)

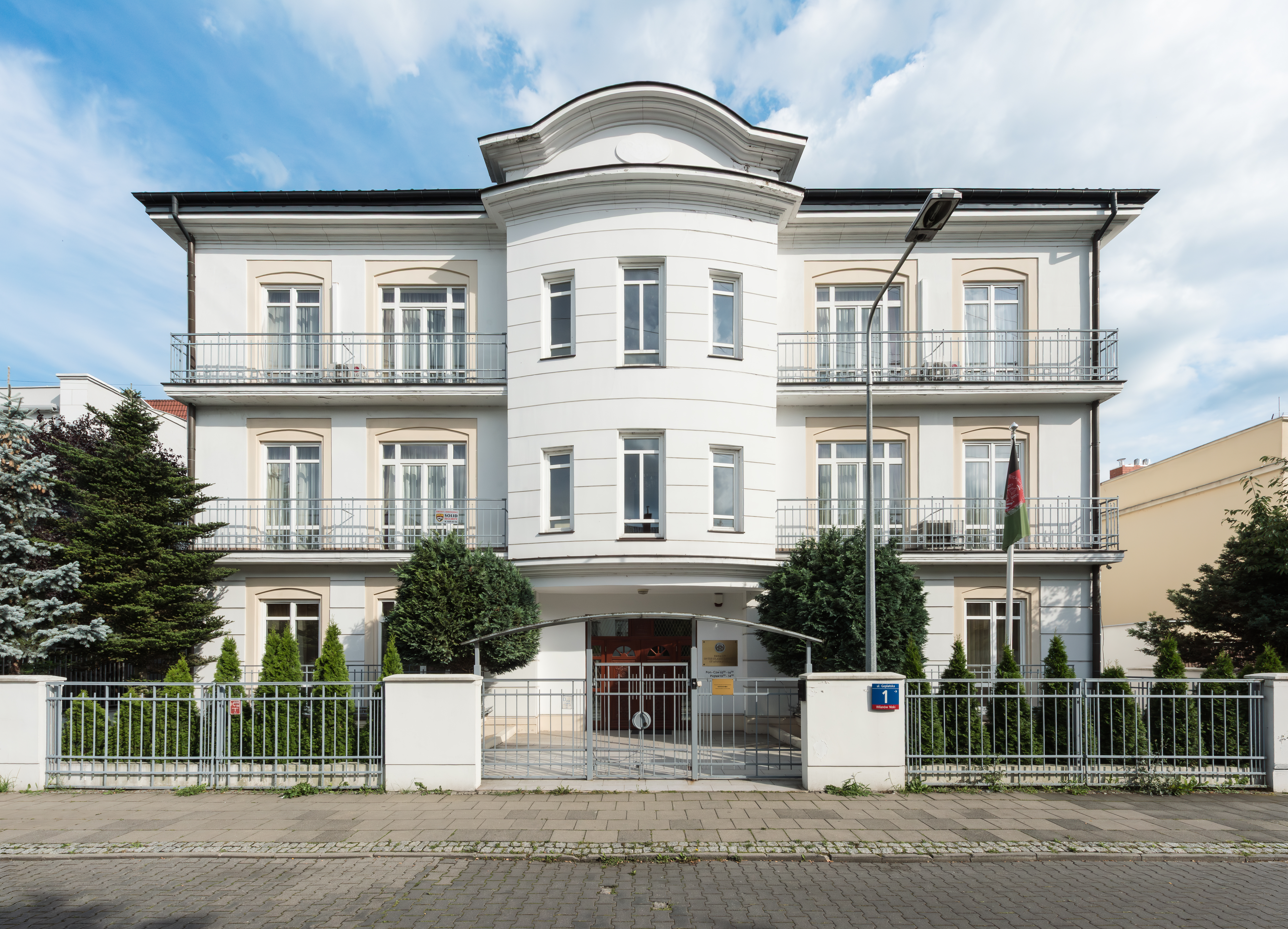
Embassy in Warsaw

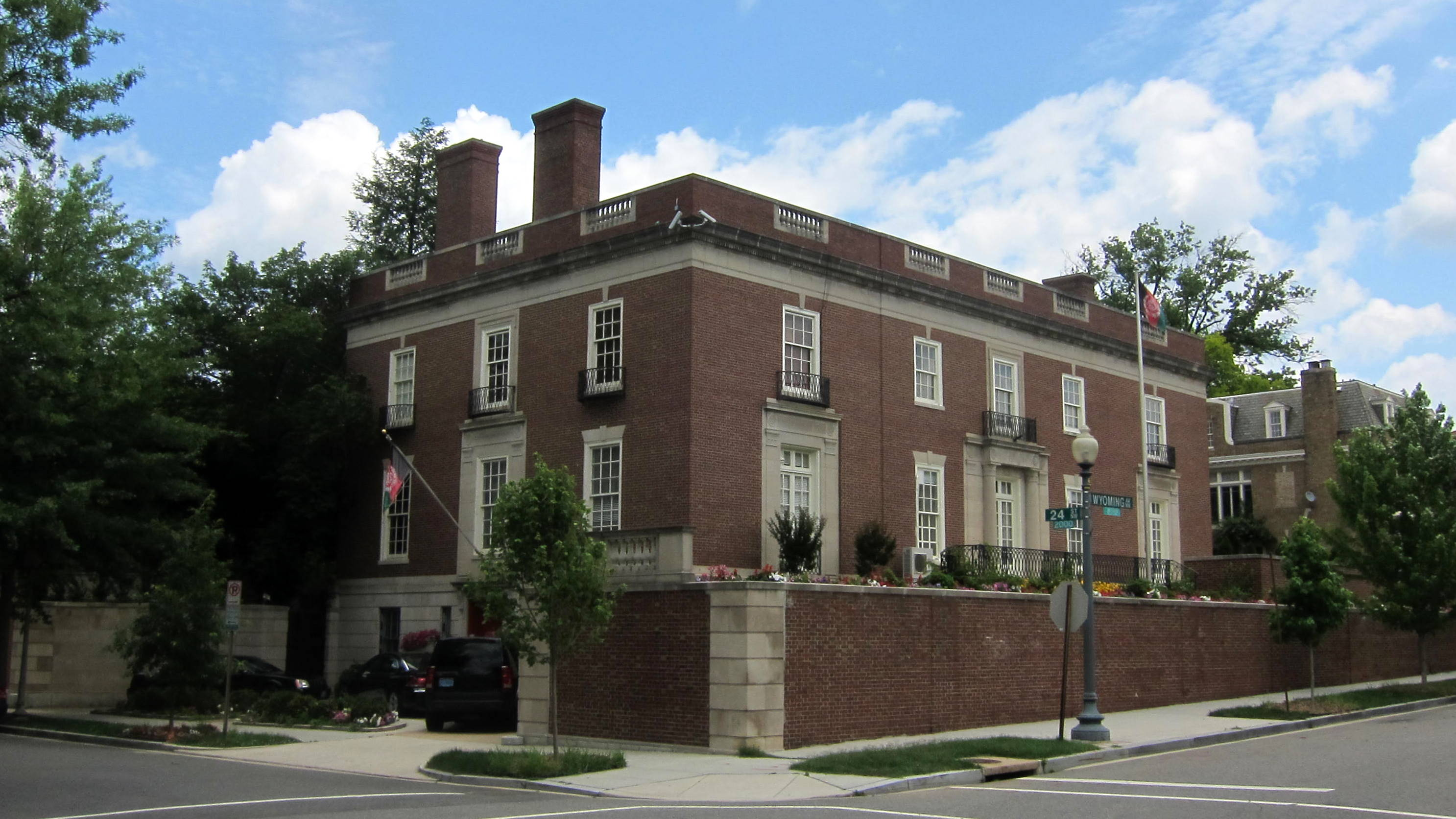
Embassy in Washington, D.C.
(closed since March 2022)

== See also ==
- Foreign relations of Afghanistan
- List of ambassadors of Afghanistan
- List of diplomatic missions in Afghanistan
- Visa policy of Afghanistan
- International relations with the Taliban
- Embassy without a government
