= Mohammed Khalid Roashan =

Afghan politician and journalist

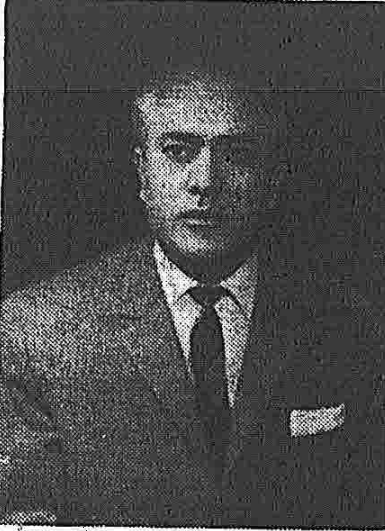
Mohammed Khalid Roashan, c. 1968

Mohammed Khalid Roashan (born 21 October 1923) was an Afghan politician and journalist.

== Life ==
Roashan was born on 21 October 1923. He graduated from the Habibia High School and the Kabul University College of Letters. He was a member of the Ariana Encyclopedia Department between 1943 and 1944. Roashan worked as an editorial board member of the daily newspaper Anis between 1947 and 1948.

He went on to pursue studies in the United States, obtaining a Bachelor of Arts degree in journalism from the University of Nebraska in 1950 and a Master of Arts degree in journalism from the University of California at Los Angeles in 1953. His thesis at UCLA was titled The Anglo-Indian oil dispute and the American press. In 1952 he was a member of the Foreign Publications Section at the Afghan Department of Press and Information.

Having returned to Afghanistan, Roashan served as editor of Anis between 1953 and 1956. Between 1956 and 1957 he served as Director-General of the Department of Press and Information. He was then sent to London, where he worked as an information officer at the Royal Afghan Embassy to the United Kingdom between 1957 and 1960. In 1960 he was named President of the Bakhtar News Agency. Between 1961 and 1963 he served as Vice President of the Department of Press and Information. He also gave classes in Journalism at Kabul University. He edited English-language publications such as Afghanistan-Ariana issued from Kabul and Afghanistan News issued from London.

Roashan completed military service in 1964. In 1964 he helped draft the Afghan constitution. The following year he was appointed Deputy Minister of Press and Information. He helped draft legislation allowing liberalization of the Afghan press in 1965.

Roashan was appointed as President of the Department of Tribal Affairs (a cabinet minister position) on 1 December 1965, placed in charge of the entity dealing with health, education and social development issues among the tribes in southern Afghanistan. He served in this role as a member of the Mohammad Hashim Maiwandwal cabinet until 12 October 1967.

Roashan was appointed Deputy Minister of Information and Culture on 18 May 1968. He remained in this post as of 1973, but his tenure in the national government ended with the fall of the monarchy.

Roashan left Afghanistan in 1979. He eventually returned to the United States, and settled down in Kirkland, Washington. As of 1988, Roashan was the president of the Afghan-American Cultural Association in Seattle.
