= Afghanistan–Japan relations =

- Afghanistan: Japan

Diplomatic mission
- none: Embassy of Japan, Kabul

Envoy
- none: Ambassador Takashi Okada

Diplomatic relations between Afghanistan and Japan (Persian: روابط دیپلماتیک میان افغانستان و جاپان, Japanese: 日本とアフガニスタンの関係) were officially established in 1931, although early contacts date back to 1907 when the Afghan general Ayub Khan, who defeated the British in the 1880 Battle of Maiwand, visited Japan.

These two countries had embassies in both capitals, until the Embassy of Afghanistan, Tokyo closed in 2026, following consultation with the government of Japan. It was run by diplomats from the Islamic Republic of Afghanistan until its closure. Japan maintains its embassy in Kabul.

== Diplomacy ==
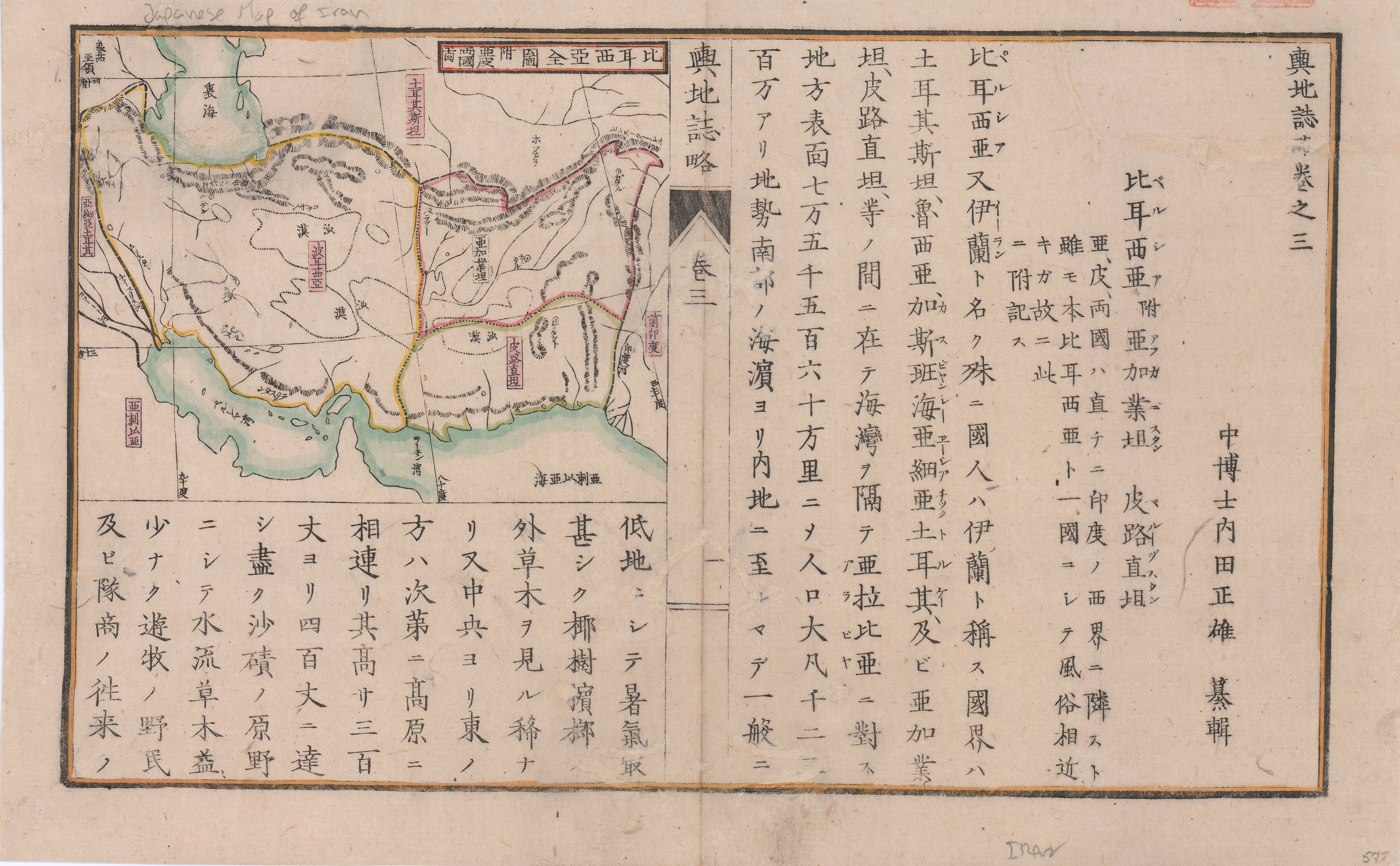
Old Japanese Map of Iran with Afghanistan and Balochistan, published in 1870

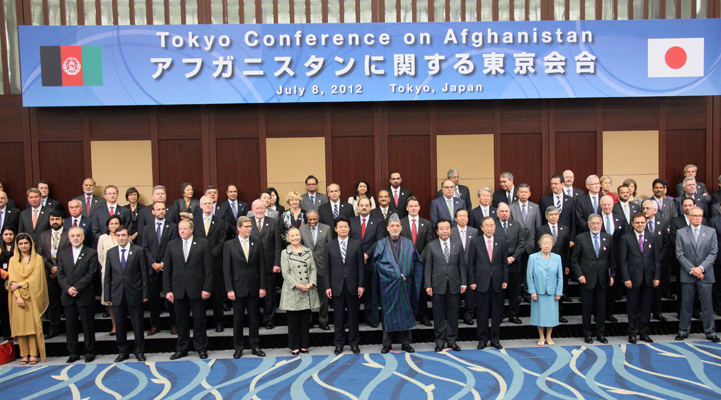
Tokyo Conference on Afghanistan, held in Tokyo on July 8, 2012

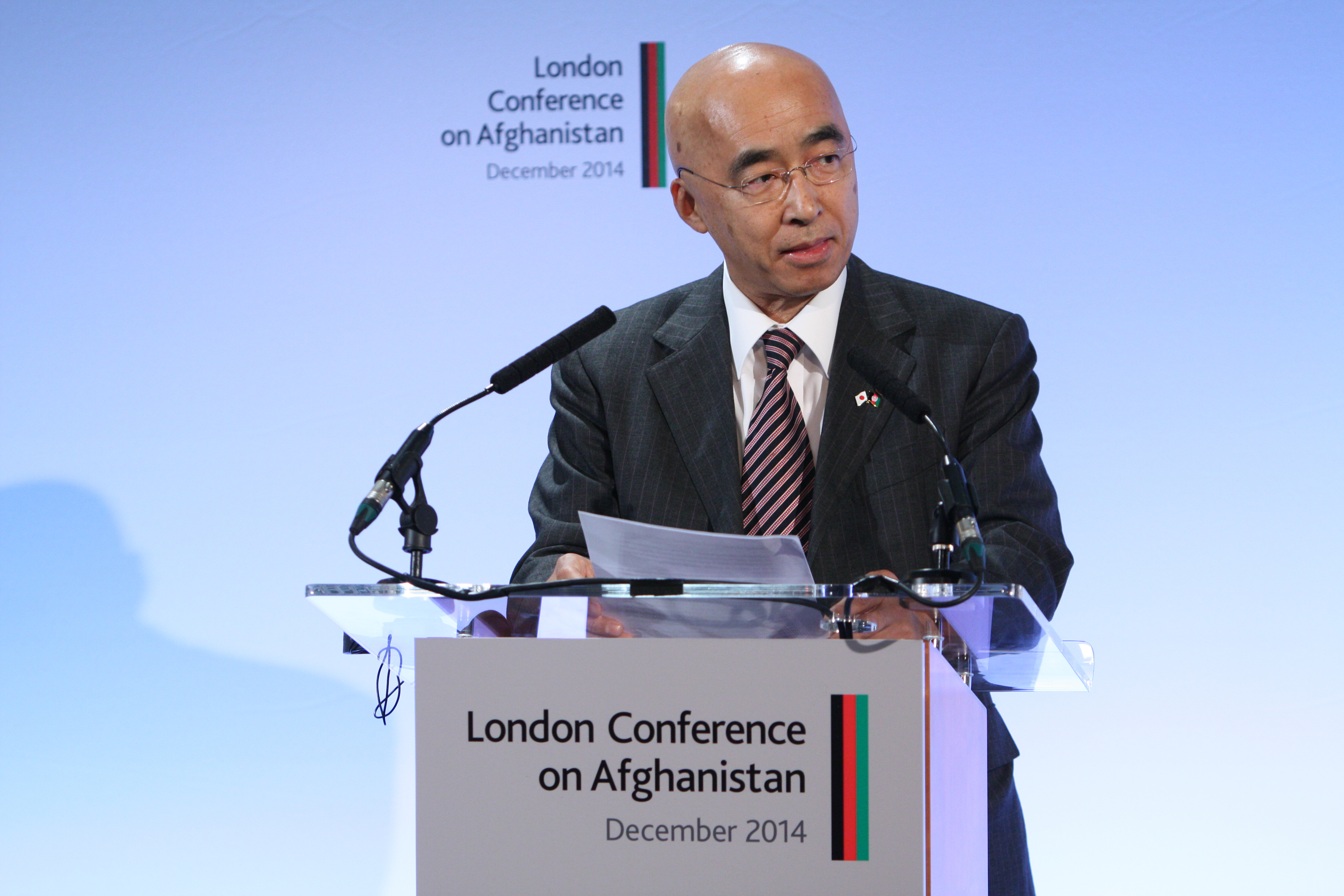
Hiroshi Takahashi, the Japanese ambassador to Afghanistan, pictured 2014

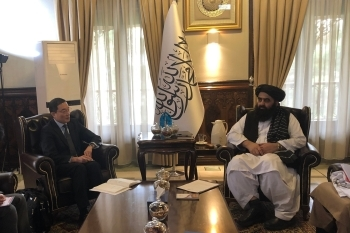
Japanese Ambassador Takashi Okada (left) met with Taliban Foreign Minister Amir Khan Muttaqi in May 2022

Ayub Khan visited Japan as a guest of Japanese Marshal Admiral Tōgō Heihachirō on February 16, 1907, where they celebrated an Asian victory against European imperialism following Japanese victory in the Russo-Japanese War. In early 1914, the Afghan King Habibullah Khan donated money, under a decree, to victims of earthquakes that occurred in Japan, including the Senboku earthquake. Likewise, Japan was well received in Afghanistan.

Hisao Tani, a Japanese military officer, visited Afghanistan in 1922. Afghan King Amanullah Khan legislated a Treaty of Friendship between the two nations at the Japanese embassy in London. This was eventually signed on 19 November 1930. Afghanistan and Japan were originally set to create official relations in 1919, but this was intentionally delayed by the United Kingdom in British India by intercepting messages.

Afghanistan was neutral during World War II, but was close to Germany. Afghanistan was pressured by the United Kingdom and Soviet Union to expel Axis diplomats from the country, which was refused. This was, eventually, accepted in November 1941 after the war situation had changed - however contrary to expectations, the Afghans allowed the Axis (including Japanese) diplomats to remain.

In 1959, Afghan prime minister Mohammed Daoud Khan visited Japan. In 1969, King Zahir Shah and Queen Humaira visited Japan - in 1971, Crown Prince Akihito and Princess Michiko visited Afghanistan.

After the Soviet invasion in 1979, Japan closed its embassy in Kabul and did not recognize any of the subsequent warring factions. In January 2002, Japan hosted the Tokyo Conference where international donors pledged aid to rebuild Afghanistan. The Japanese embassy reopened in Kabul and has since engaged in various types of assistance to Afghanistan. As of 2012, Japan is the second largest donor to Afghanistan after the United States.

In June 2010, Afghan President Hamid Karzai, who was on a state visit to Japan, said that Japan would get priority on the exploration of mineral resources in Afghanistan, in return for the aid Japan has given to Afghanistan since 2002.

Following the Fall of Kabul to the Taliban in August 2021, Japan immediately closed its embassy in Kabul due to security concerns in Afghanistan, whereas Tokyo still hosts Shaida Mohammad Abdali, who was nominated by President Ashraf Ghani, as the Ambassador Extraordinary and Plenipotentiary of Afghanistan. In May 2022, Japanese Ambassador Takashi Okada met with senior members of the Taliban, including Foreign Minister Amir Khan Muttaqi and State Minister Abdul Kabir, and expressed Japan’s readiness to provide humanitarian aid to Afghanistan through international organizations whilst he also urged them to protect the human rights of women and ethnic minorities. In September 2022, Japan reopened the embassy in Kabul. Several Taliban members, such as Abdul Latif Nazari visited Japan in February 16, 2025.

== Culture ==
Similarities in the two nations have been noted in that both had historically thwarted foreign occupation, and that both have shared a title among the lines of "land of the rising sun" - for Afghanistan, this was its former name, Khorasan. Certain similar traditions have also been noted, dating back to ancient times as Zoroastrianism and Buddhism spread to the far east via Afghanistan and the Silk Road. Mahmud Tarzi saw Japan as a model for modernization and development whilst preserving traditions.

In 2004, the Japanese ambassador Kinichi Komano said of cultural similarities: "Japanese people have their own very old culture and civilization, and they are grateful to the Afghan people because of Buddhism, which entered Japan from India through Afghanistan, China and Korea. This shared history is well understood by almost all Japanese people. Also, because of the same experience or situation that the two nations had in the past century or so, that is, the complete devastation of the country – due to World War II in the case of Japan, and the civil war in Afghanistan’s case. [...] The people of Japan and the people of Afghanistan also have in common their warm hospitality to people, to their friends."

There is evidence of a shared relationship between Shinto and pre-Islamic Nuristani religion alongside Vedic religion, suggesting a period of contact dating from 2000 BCE onwards.

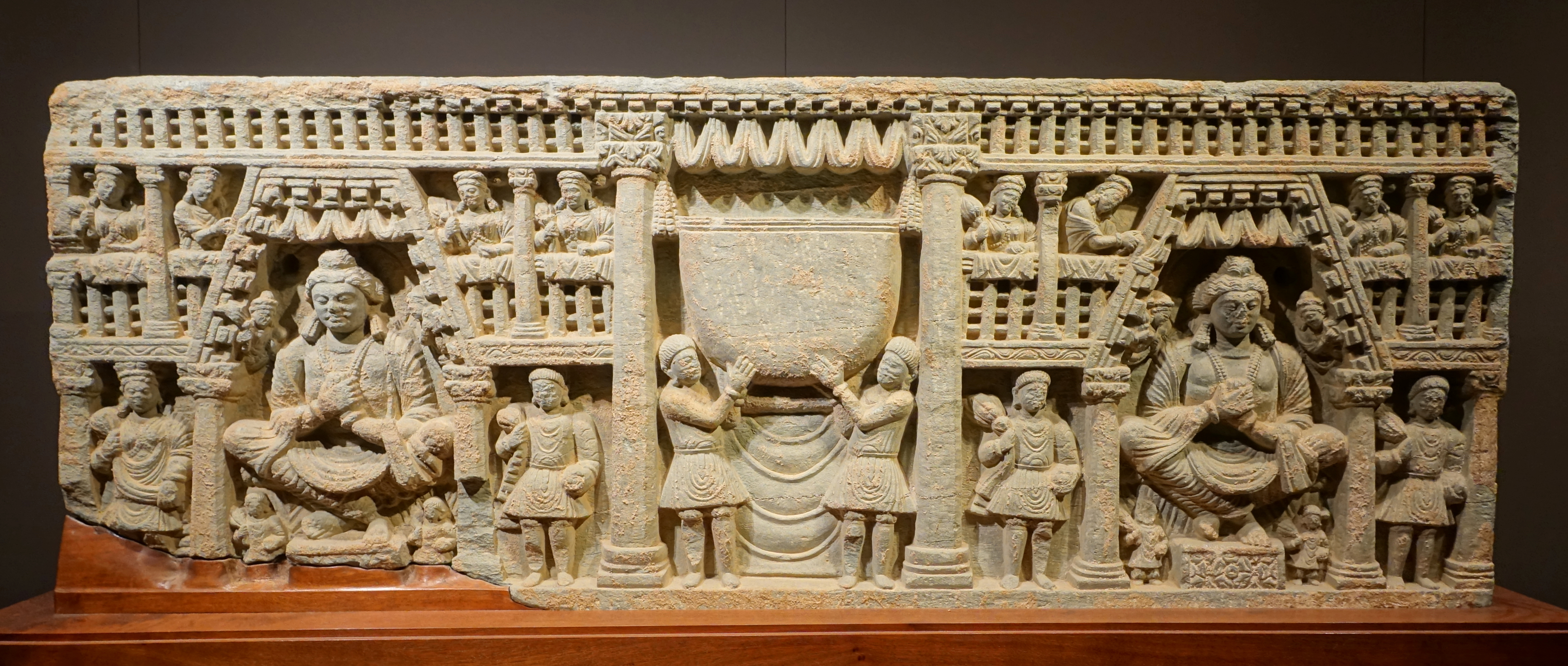
An ancient Buddhist-era Afghanistan schist at the Tokyo National Museum

In 2016, 102 artifacts from Afghanistan that were protected in Japan during the civil war were returned to the National Museum of Afghanistan.

== See also ==
- Embassy of Afghanistan, Tokyo
- Embassy of Japan, Kabul
