= Embassy of Afghanistan, New Delhi =

Diplomatic mission of Afghanistan in India

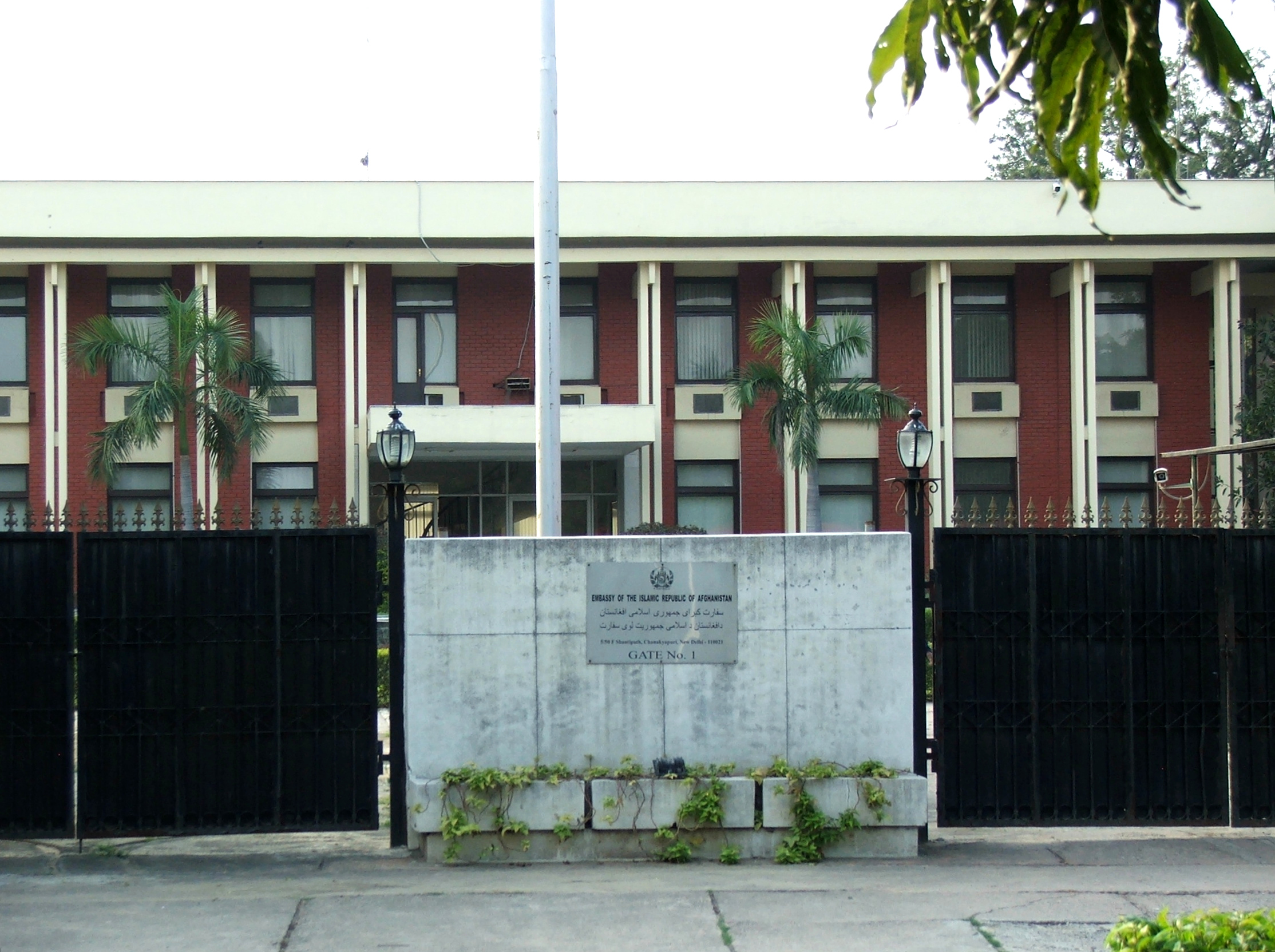
- Address: 5/50-F, Shantipath, Chanakyapuri, New Delhi, Delhi 110021
- Coordinates: 28°35′30″N 77°11′11″E
- Jurisdiction: Bhutan; India; Nepal
- Chargé d'affaires: Noor Ahmad Noor

The Embassy of Afghanistan in New Delhi is the diplomatic mission of Afghanistan to India. The chancery is located at 5/50-F Shantipath in Chanakyapuri, New Delhi. In addition to the embassy, Afghanistan also operates consulates general in Mumbai and Hyderabad.

The embassy was reopened in October 2025 after being closed in December 2023 by the former Islamic Republic-era diplomats. In January 2026, India accredited the Taliban diplomat Noor Ahmad Noor as the Chargé d'Affaires of the embassy.

== History ==
=== 2023 Shutdown of mission ===
On 1 October 2023, the Afghan Embassy in New Delhi ceased its operation in India citing "lack of diplomatic support" from the host government, failure to "meet expectations....to serve the best interest of Afghanistan" and paucity of resources and personnel.

Farid Mamundzay, who was appointed as the Ambassador of Afghanistan in India by the Ashraf Ghani government, however announced on September 30, 2023, closure of the Afghan Embassy in New Delhi. In November 2023, remaining two consul generals were given control of the embassy and consulates in India, and had resumed the operations.

=== Taliban diplomats stationed ===
The Taliban government has appointed its senior member Mufti Noor Ahmad Noor as its Chargé d'Affaires in India. Although India had not yet recognize the Islamic Emirate of Afghanistan at this time, it handed it over to Taliban officials on 10 January 2026.

== Ambassadors ==
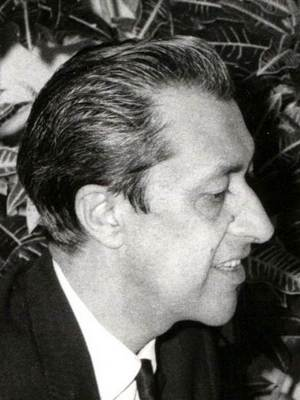
Attaullah Nasser Zia

=== Kingdom of Afghanistan (1926–1973) ===
- 1954 to 1958; Sardar Najibullah, Sardar Najibullah Khan, Special Representative of His Majesty the King of Afghanistan in Pakistan, presenting his credentials on 3 December 1947
- 6 April 1954 (or 1958 ?); Sardar-i-Ala Abdul Husain Aziz
- 14 March 1957 (Or 1958?) to ? (12 y ?); Sardar-i-Ala General Mohammad Omar 16 February 1965 to 14 January 1966
- 5 December 1964 (Or 16 March 1965) to 14 January 1966 (2 y); Mohammed Kabir Ludin (born 1907; died 14 January 1966 in New Delhi) was 1954 ambassador to the UN-Headquarter in New York City and Washington, D. C. presented credentials on 5 December 1957 in London and 16 February 1965 in New Delhi. Prior to his ambassadorial functions, Ludin was Minister of Public works.
- 1966 to ? (3 y); Attaullah Nasser Zia
- 1968 to ?; Dr. Anas
- ? to ? (3 y) H.E. Mr. Abdul Samad
- 19 September 1970 to ? (4 y); Abdul Hakim Tabibi designated on 29 July 1980 he was ambassador to the UN in New York City.

=== Republic of Afghanistan (1973–1978) ===
- 16 November 1973 to ? (3 y?); Abdul Rahman Pazhwak
- 1973 to ? (1 y); Dr. Abdul Zahir, Members of an Afghan Parliamentary delegation led by Dr. Abdul Zahir, President of the Afghan National Assembly, with the Prime Minister, Shri Jawaharlal Nehru, when they called on him in New Delhi on 16 December Shri
- 1976; Hamidullah Enayat Seraj; 1974: Ambassador to the Court of St. James's

=== Democratic Republic of Afghanistan (1978–1992) ===
- 1 September 1978 to ? (1.5 y ?); Pacha Gul Wafadar, he presented his Letter of Credence to the President, Mr N. Sanjiva Reddy, in New Delhi, on 1 September.
- Before 1981 to ???? (7 y); Dr. Mohammad Hasan Sharq
- 12 November 1986 to August 1989 (? years); Abdul Samad Azhar
- 11 October 1989 to ? (4 years); Wazir Ahmad Faizi
- Before April 1991 to 17 April 1992; Ahmad Sarwar

=== Islamic State of Afghanistan (1992–2002) ===
- ? to ? (3 years); Eshan Jaan Arif
- 29 February 1996 to 27 November 2005; Masood Khalili

=== Islamic Republic of Afghanistan (2004–2021) ===
- 13 November 2006 to 15 January 2010; Sayed Makhdoom Raheen
- 30 June 2010 to 28 May 2012; Dr. Nanguyalai Tarzi
- 13 July 2012 to 19 September 2018; Shaida Mohammad Abdali
- 18 March 2021 to November 2023; Farid Mamundzay

== See also ==
- Afghanistan–India relations
- List of diplomatic missions of Afghanistan
- List of diplomatic missions in Afghanistan
- List of diplomatic missions in India
- List of diplomatic missions of India
- Foreign relations: Afghanistan | India
