= Embassy of Afghanistan, Berlin =

Embassy of Afghanistan in Berlin
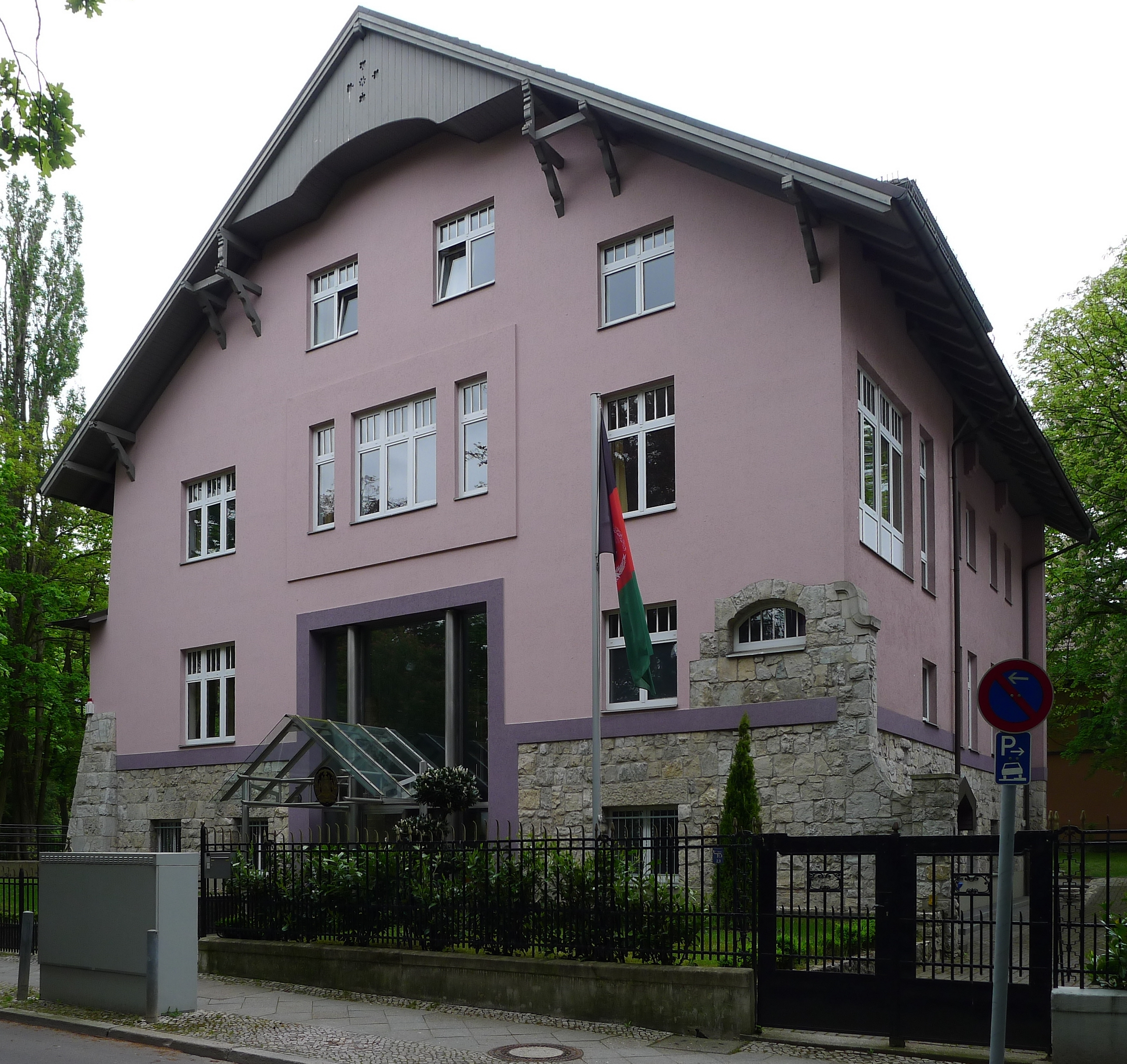
- Afghan Embassy at Taunusstraße 3 in Berlin-Grunewald
- Address: Taunusstraße 3, 14193 Berlin
- Coordinates: 52°28′47.4″N 13°16′42.22″E
- Ambassador: Yama Yari
- Website: Official website

The Embassy of Afghanistan in Berlin (Pashto: د افغانستان سفارت، برلینDari: سفارت افغانستان در برلین; German: Afghanische Botschaft in Berlin) is the diplomatic mission of the Islamic Republic of Afghanistan to Germany. Yama Yari has been the ambassador since February 3, 2021.

The embassy is located in a country house at Taunusstraße 3 in the Berlin district of Grunewald in the Charlottenburg-Wilmersdorf district. The embassy site is on the corner of Kronberger Strasse 5. The consulate belonging to the embassy is located at this address. Afghanistan also maintains two Consuls general in Bonn and in Grünwald near Munich, in Bonn they emerged from the former seat of the embassy.

== See also ==
- List of diplomatic missions of Germany
- Afghanistan-Germany relations
- Embassy of Germany, Kabul
