= Embassy of Afghanistan, Washington, D.C. =

Embassy of the Islamic Republic of Afghanistan د افغانستان اسلامي جمهوری سفارت سفارت جمهوری اسلامی افغانستان
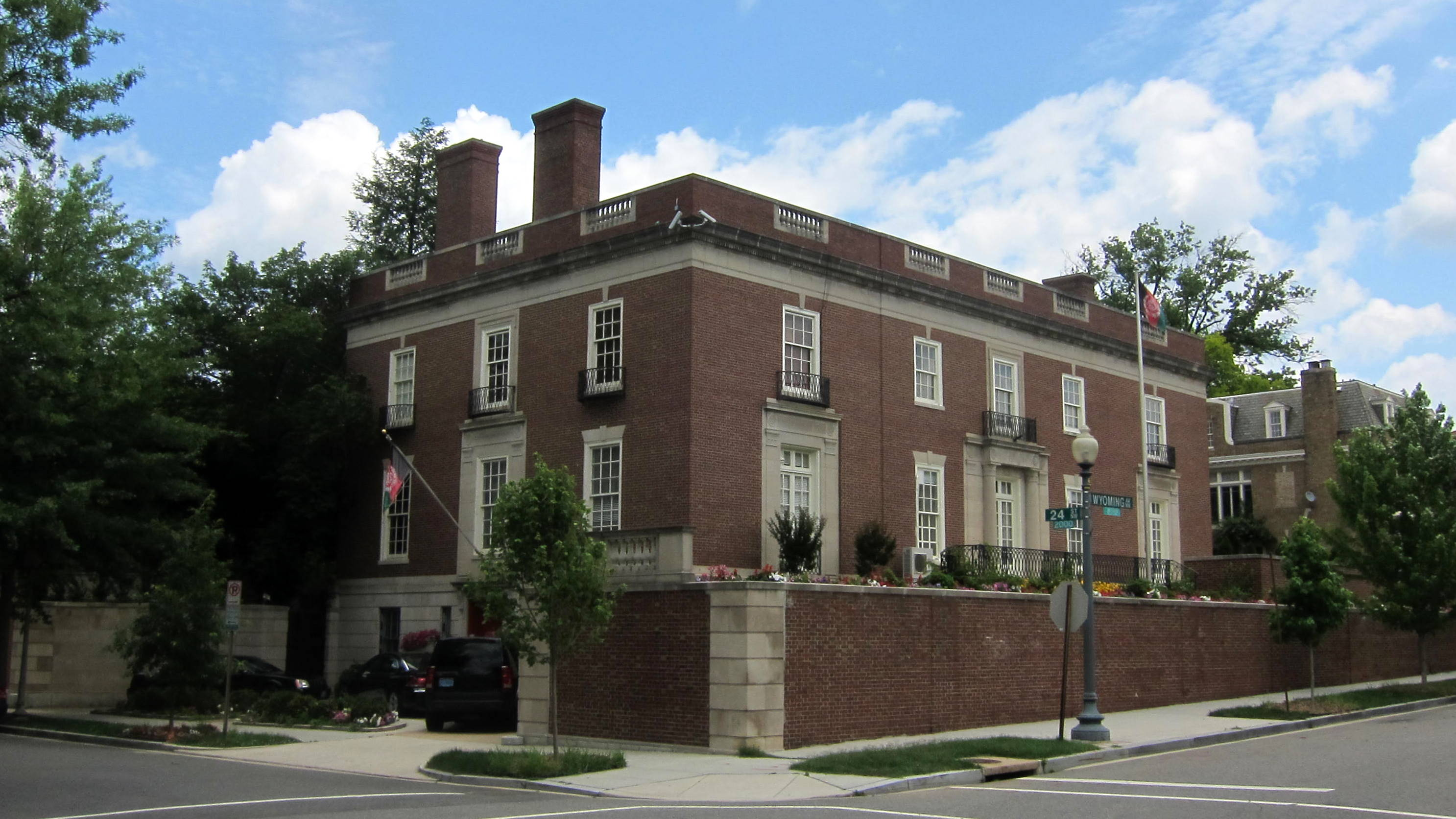
- Location: Washington, D.C.
- Address: 2341 Wyoming Avenue, N.W.
- Coordinates: 38°55′2″N 77°03′8.2″W
- Closed: 16 March 2022
- Website: afghanembassy.us (dead) (17 March 2022 archive)

The Embassy of the Islamic Republic of Afghanistan in Washington, D.C. (Pashto: د افغانستان اسلامي جمهوری سفارت; Dari: سفارت جمهوری اسلامی افغانستان) was the primary diplomatic mission of the Islamic Republic of Afghanistan to the United States. The building is located at 2341 Wyoming Avenue N.W. in Washington, D.C.'s Kalorama neighborhood. The chancery is built in the Colonial Revival style.

== Location ==
Consular offices were located at 2233 Wisconsin Avenue NW in Washington, D.C., as well as in New York City and Los Angeles.

From 1944 to 1963, the embassy was located at 2001 24th Street NW. The structure was built by Judge Edwin B. Parker in 1926, and designed by prominent D.C. architect Nathan C. Wyeth.

== Shutdowns ==
In 1997, the embassy was closed by the United States due to a clash between the chargé d'affaires and an embassy deputy. The chargé d'affaires, Yar M. Mohabbat, represented the Islamic State of Afghanistan led by Burhanuddin Rabbani and Ahmad Shah Massoud. The embassy deputy, Seraj Wardak Jamal, revolted against Mohabbat and pledged allegiance to the Taliban, who had recently captured Kabul and ousted Rabbani and Massoud. The United States decided to temporarily suspend operations at the embassy because there was "no effective government in Afghanistan."

Following the 2021 fall of Kabul to the Taliban and the dissolution of the Islamic Republic in August 2021, the embassy and consulates remained in operation independently. Due to funding freezes related to sanctions, the Afghan diplomatic missions encountered financial issues, with many diplomats going unpaid for months. The final Afghan ambassador to the U.S. was Adela Raz, who resigned in February 2022 after the U.S. State Department made moves to severely limit the activities of Afghan diplomats, according to Deputy Ambassador Abdul Hadi Nijrabi. In March 2022, the State Department announced that the embassy and consulates would close by the end of the month, and diplomats would have thirty days to apply for residency or humanitarian parole, with one-fourth of the 100 diplomatic staff in the United States not having applied yet. The State Department said it would maintain the properties until the missions could resume operations. The embassy and consulates closed on March 16, and all diplomatic and consular activities ceased. In a statement, the embassy claimed it had requested assistance from the State Department due to its financial challenges, and it had agreed to a suggestion by the department to transfer custody of the properties in accordance with the Vienna Convention. The flag of the Islamic Republic of Afghanistan will remain hoisted at the facilities. The embassy and consulates were the first diplomatic missions of Afghanistan to close in the aftermath of the Taliban takeover. The Afghan embassy in Canada took over responsibilities for providing services to Afghan nationals in the United States.

== See also ==
- Afghanistan–United States relations
- Ambassadors of Afghanistan to the United States
- Embassy of the United States, Kabul
- Ambassadors of the United States to Afghanistan
