= 1914 Senboku earthquake =

Earthquake in Japan

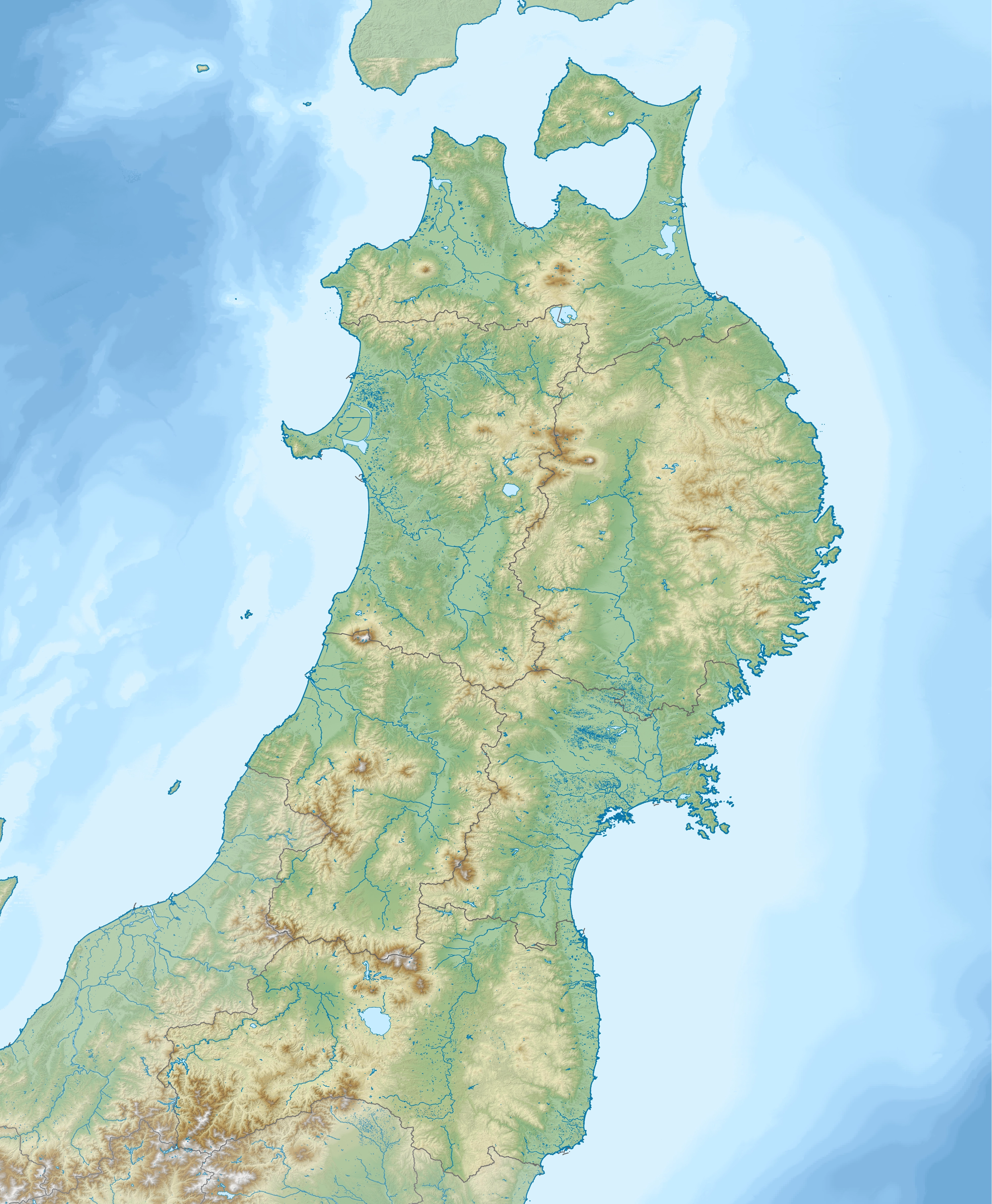
- Location within Tohoku, Japan Location within Akita Prefecture
- UTC time: 1914-03-14 20:00:06
- ISC event: 913972
- USGS-ANSS: ComCat
- Local date: March 15, 1914
- Local time: 05:00
- Magnitude: M_{s} 7.0
- Depth: 5 km
- Epicenter: 39.50°N 140.40°E
- Areas affected: Japan
- Casualties: 94 dead, 324 injured

The 1914 Senboku earthquake (Japanese: 1914年秋田仙北地震) occurred on March 15, 1914, at 04:59 or 05:00 local time (or March 14 at 20:00 UTC) according to various sources in northern Japan. The earthquake had a magnitude of M_{s} 7.0.

The epicenter was in Akita Prefecture, Japan. Ninety-four people died and 324 were injured. Senboku District (Japanese: 仙北郡) was seriously affected. The earthquake caused liquefaction. Explosions simultaneous with the earthquake were reported in Mount Asama.
