= Embassy of Afghanistan, Tokyo =

Coordinates: 35°39′28″N 139°44′31″E

Embassy of the Islamic Republic of Afghanistan in Tokyo په جاپان کې د افغانستان سفارت سفارت افغانستان در جاپان 駐日アフガニスタン大使館
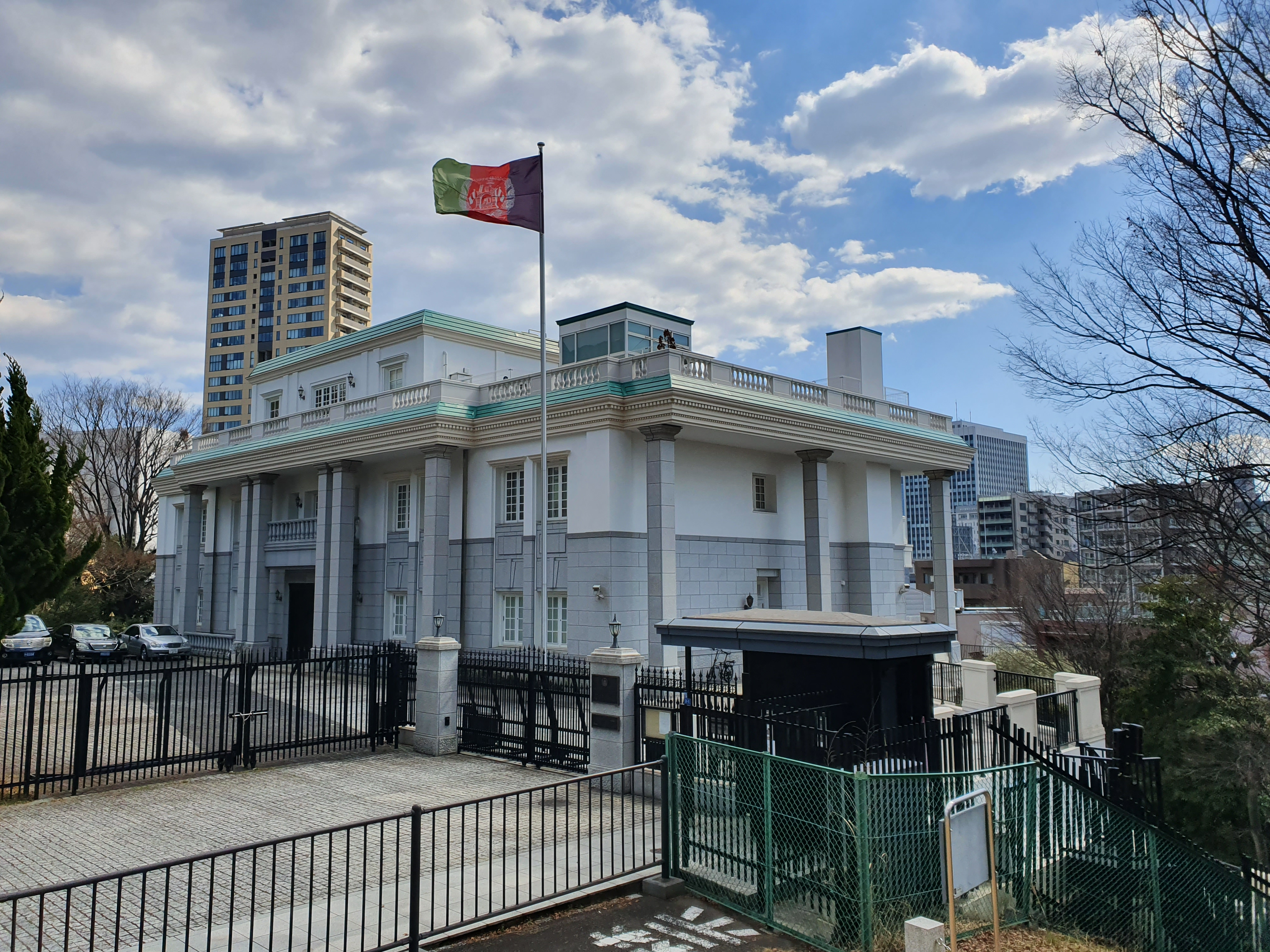
- Location: Tokyo
- Address: 2 Chome-2-1 Azabudai, Minato City, Tokyo 106-0041
- Opened: October 1933 (legation) May 1956 (embassy)
- Closed: 31 January 2026
- Jurisdiction: Japan / Singapore / Philippines
- Website: https://www.tokyo.mfa.af/

The Embassy of the Islamic Republic of Afghanistan in Tokyo (Pashto: په جاپان کې د افغانستان سفارت : Dari: سفارت افغانستان در جاپان; Japanese: 駐日アフガニスタン大使館) was the Islamic Republic of Afghanistan's diplomatic mission to Japan. It was also accredited to the Philippines and Singapore. The embassy is located in Minato-ku, Tokyo. The Embassy was closed on 31 January 2026 following the Japanese Government decision.

== History ==
The first permanent Afghan diplomatic presence in Japan was established in 1933 with the opening of a legation in Tokyo. The legation was located at 7 Aoba-cho, Shibuya-ku, Tokyo.

In 1944 the legation closed and evacuated its staff to Karuizawa to avoid Allied bombing raids of Tokyo. In 1956 Afghanistan upgraded its legation in Tokyo to an embassy.

During the rule of the Islamic Emirate of Afghanistan from 1996 to 2001, the embassy remained closed. After the 2001 US invasion of Afghanistan, a new government was formed in Kabul that reestablished diplomatic relations with Japan. The embassy was reopened on December 26, 2002.

In July 2008 the embassy relocated from its property at 3-37-8-B Nishihara Shibuya-ku, Tokyo 151-0066, to its current location in Azabudai, Minato, Tokyo. The building the embassy currently occupies was a conference center for Japanese central government agencies.

Following the Fall of Kabul to the Taliban in August 2021, the Islamic Republic of Afghanistan was dissolved and replaced by the Islamic Emirate of Afghanistan. The embassy continues to represent the internationally recognized government of Afghanistan and not the Islamic Emirate rule of Taliban. The embassy does not receive financial assistance from the Taliban government and has cut 70% of its staff following the collapse of the Islamic Republic government. The remaining diplomats do not receive a salary. Following the Japanese Government decision, on 31 January 2026, the Afghan Embassy was closed indefinitely.

== Library ==
The embassy has a library containing over 4,000 books in Pashto, Dari, English, and Japanese. The handmade doors to the library room have been created by a traditional craftsman in Kabul.

== Building ==
The embassy has four floors, as well as a rooftop patio with views of Tokyo Tower. An elevator connects all four floors and the roof. Two of the floors are below ground and the other two are above ground.

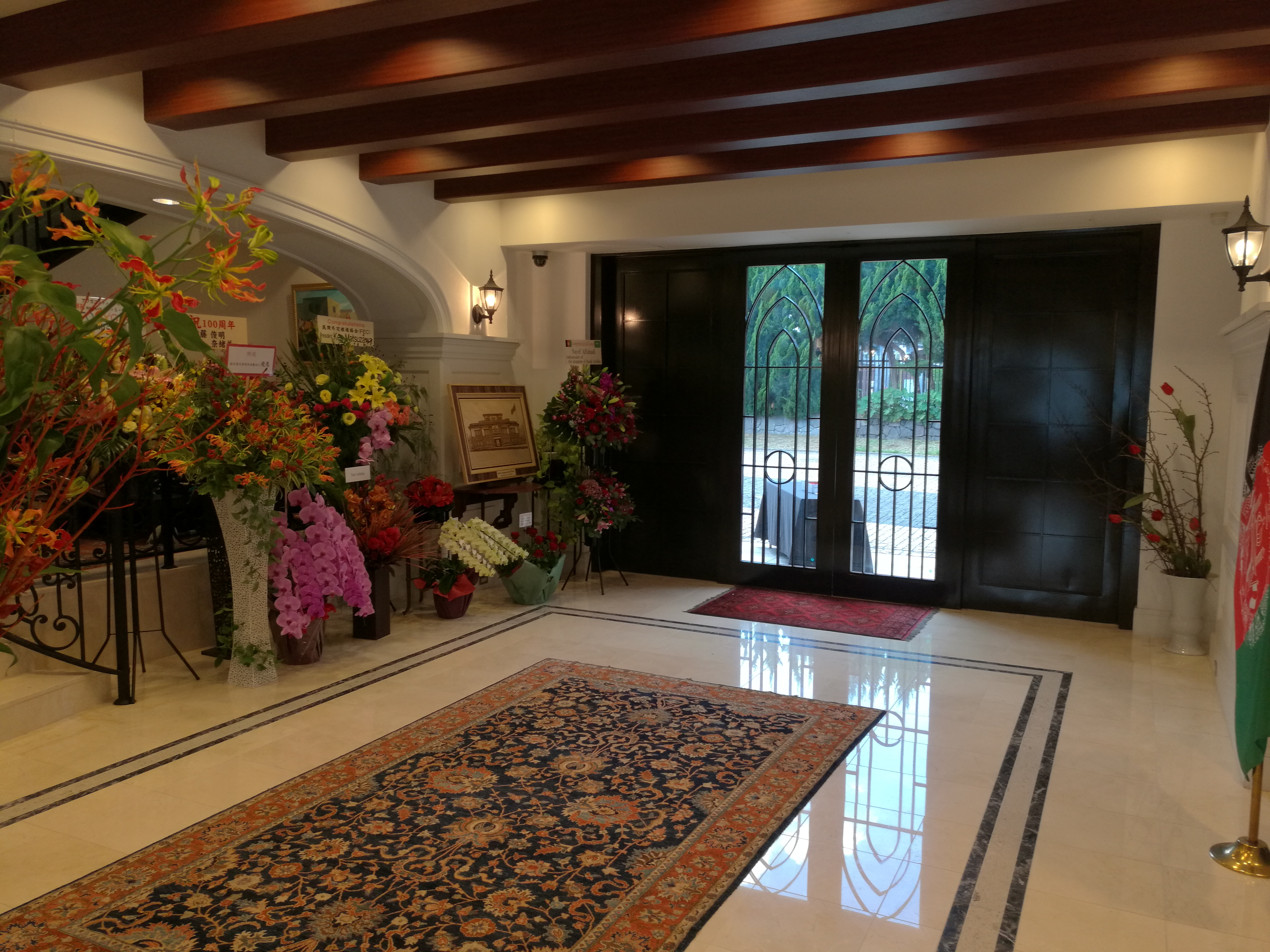
Main entrance, located on the third floor (ground level).

== See also ==
- Afghanistan-Japan relations
- List of ambassadors of Afghanistan to Japan
- Embassy of Japan, Kabul
