= List of diplomatic missions in Afghanistan =

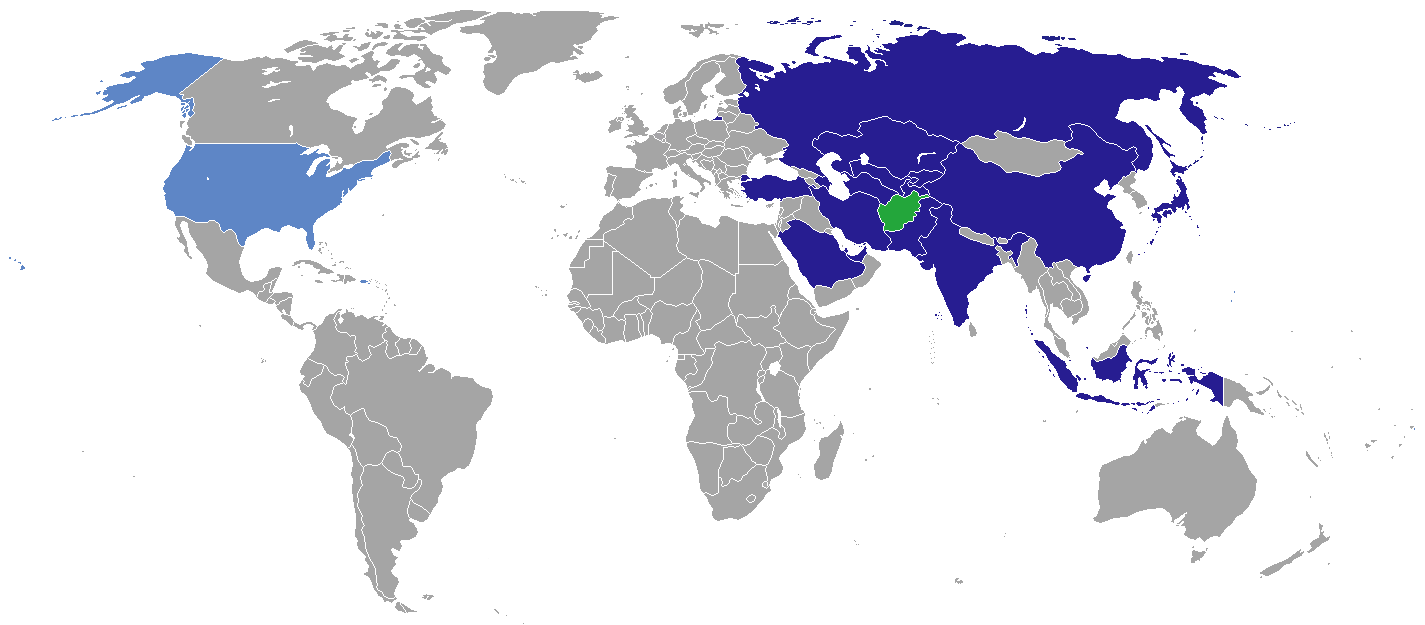
Diplomatic missions in Kabul

This is a list of diplomatic missions in Afghanistan. There are currently 16 embassies in Kabul.

== Embassies in Kabul ==
1. Azerbaijan
2. China
3. India
4. Indonesia
5. Iran
6. Japan
7. Kazakhstan
8. Kyrgyzstan
9. Pakistan
10. Qatar
11. Russia
12. Tajikistan
13. Turkey
14. Turkmenistan
15. United Arab Emirates
16. Uzbekistan

== Other posts in Kabul ==
- European Union (Delegation)
- United States (interests section – Qatar is the protecting power)

== Gallery ==
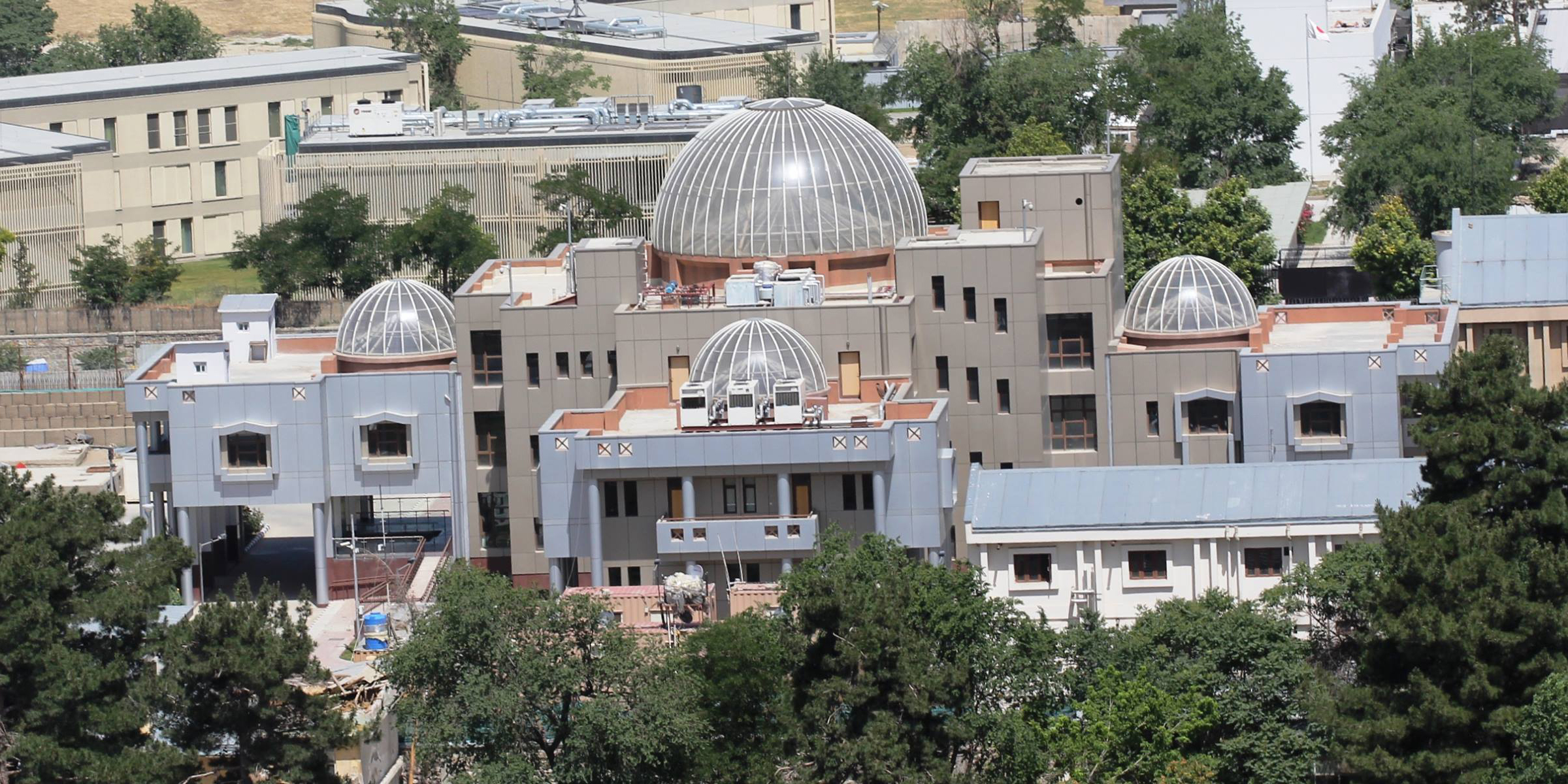
Embassy of India, Kabul

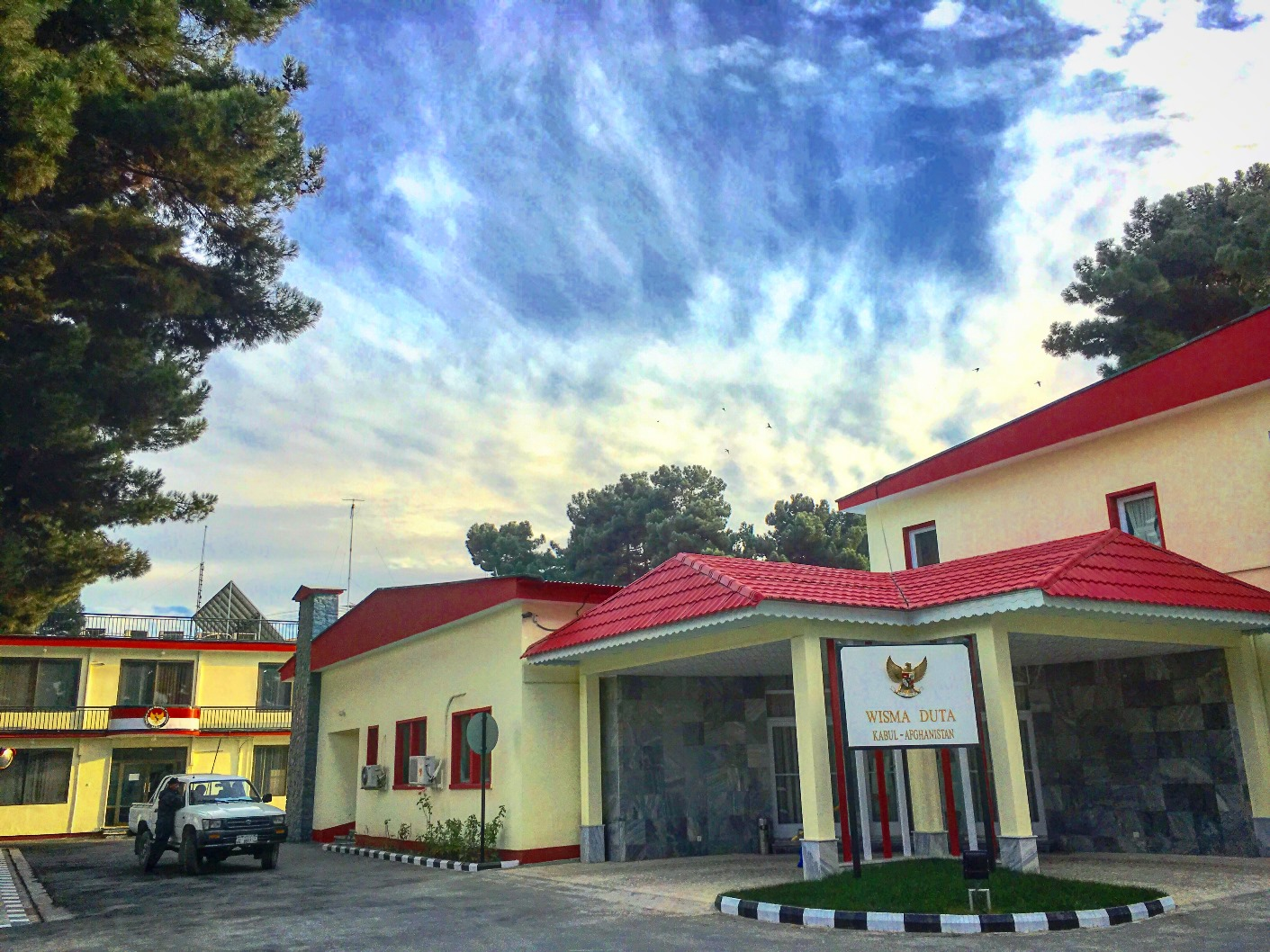
Embassy of Indonesia in Kabul

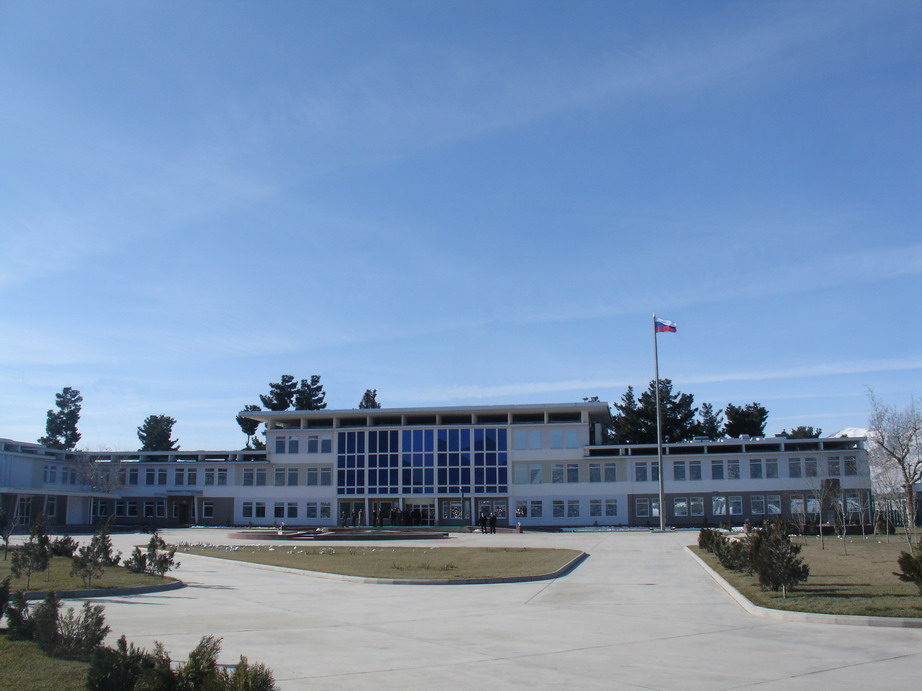
Embassy of Russia in Kabul

== Consular missions ==
=== Herat ===
- Iran
- Pakistan (Consulate-General)
- Turkey
- Turkmenistan

=== Jalalabad ===
- Pakistan (Consulate-General)

=== Kandahar ===
- Iran (Consulate-General)
- Pakistan (Consulate-General)

=== Mazar-i-Sharif ===
- Iran (Consulate-General)
- Pakistan (Consulate-General)
- Turkey
- Turkmenistan
- Uzbekistan

== Accredited embassies ==
Resident in Abu Dhabi, United Arab Emirates

- Dominica
- Ireland
- Seychelles

Resident in Ankara, Turkey

- Croatia
- Kosovo

Resident in Doha, Qatar

- Haiti
- Italy
- South Korea
- Netherlands
- United Kingdom
- United States

Resident in Islamabad, Pakistan

- Argentina
- Algeria
- Austria
- Bahrain
- Brazil
- Belgium
- Bosnia and Herzegovina
- Cuba
- Hungary
- Jordan
- Lebanon
- Libya
- Morocco
- Nepal
- North Korea
- Palestine
- Portugal
- Philippines
- Romania
- Sahrawi Republic
- Serbia
- South Africa
- Sri Lanka
- Switzerland
- Sudan
- Thailand
- Ukraine
- Vietnam

Resident in Kuwait City, Kuwait

- Central African Republic
- Sierra Leone
- Togo

Resident in Moscow, Russia

- Costa Rica
- Cape Verde
- Ecuador

Resident in New Delhi, India

- Bhutan
- Bulgaria
- Colombia
- Lesotho
- Maldives
- Malaysia
- Poland
- Peru

Resident in Tehran, Iran

- Chile
- Guinea
- Ivory Coast
- Kenya
- Mali
- Mexico
- New Zealand
- Senegal
- Uruguay
- Venezuela
- Zimbabwe

Resident Elsewhere

- Armenia (Astana)
- Bangladesh (Tashkent)
- Estonia (Tallinn)
- Georgia (Ashgabat)
- Iceland (Oslo)
- Latvia (Tashkent)
- Malta (Valletta)
- Micronesia (New York City)
- Nicaragua (Beijing)
- Tanzania (Riyadh)
- Zambia (Beijing)

== Closed missions ==
| Host city | Sending country | Mission | Year closed | Ref. |
|---|---|---|---|---|
| Kabul | Australia | Embassy | 2021 | |
| Kabul | Belgium | Embassy (Note: Resident in Islamabad, Pakistan) | 2015 | |
| Kabul | Bulgaria | Embassy (Note: Resident in New Delhi, India) | 2018 | |
| Kabul | Canada | Embassy | 2021 | |
| Kabul | Chechnya | Embassy (Note: Chechen embassy closed, due to the Fall of Grozny.) | 2001 | |
| Kabul | Czech Republic | Embassy | 2021 | |
| Kabul | Denmark | Embassy | 2021 | |
| Kabul | Egypt | Embassy | 2021 | |
| Kabul | Finland | Embassy | 2021 | |
| Kabul | France | Embassy | 2021 | |
| Kabul | Germany | Embassy | 2021 | |
| Kabul | Hungary | Embassy | 2015 | |
| Kabul | Iraq | Embassy | 2017 | |
| Kabul | Italy | Embassy (Note: Resident in Doha, Qatar) | 2021 | |
| Kabul | Libya | Embassy | 2009 | |
| Kabul | Mongolia | Embassy | 1992 | |
| Kabul | Netherlands | Embassy | 2021 | |
| Kabul | New Zealand | Embassy (Note: Resident in Tehran, Iran) | 2014 | |
| Kabul | Norway | Embassy | 2021 | |
| Kabul | Poland | Embassy | 2013 | |
| Kabul | Romania | Embassy | 2021 | |
| Kabul | Republic of Korea | Embassy | 2021 | |
| Kabul | Spain | Embassy | 2021 | |
| Kabul | Sweden | Embassy | 2021 | |
| Kabul | United Kingdom | Embassy | 2021 | |
| Kabul | United States | Embassy (Note: Resident in Doha, Qatar) (Note: Under the protecting power of Qatar.) | 2021 | |
| Kabul | Vietnam | Embassy | 1992 | |
| Kandahar | Chechnya | Consulate (Note: Chechen consulate closed, due to the Fall of Grozny.) | 2001 | |
