= Embassy of Germany, Kabul =

Diplomatic mission of Germany for Afghanistan

Embassy of Germany, Kabul سفارت آلمان در کابل
- Location: Kabul, Afghanistan
- Address: Wazir Akbar Khan, Mena 6, Kabul
- Coordinates: 34.532060°N 69.180184°E
- Ambassador: Axel Zeidler

The Embassy of Germany in Kabul was the diplomatic mission of the Federal Republic of Germany in Afghanistan. The Consulate General also operates in Mazar-i-Sharif as a second German mission in the country. The embassy in Kabul is located in the diplomatic district of the capital on Wazir Akbar Khan, Mena 6 in Kabul. The current Ambassador is Axel Zeidler.

== History ==
In 2013, Germany opened the consulate general in a former hotel in Mazar-i-Sharif, the second German diplomatic mission other than the embassy.

The devastating bomb attack in Kabul on May 31, 2017, which killed 150 people and injured 400, took place near various embassies, including the German Mission. The embassy buildings were so badly damaged that demolition was considered. The office of the German foreign intelligence service BND at the embassy was also badly damaged. After the attack, all employees from Afghanistan were initially withdrawn, with only one core team continuing to work from NATO headquarters. 30 Bundeswehr soldiers from the German Resolute Support Mission protected the grounds of the embassy until its reopening.

Since 15 August 2021, the embassy is closed until further notice.
