= Embassy of Afghanistan, London =

Embassy of the Islamic Republic of Afghanistan د افغانستان اسلامي جمهوری سفارت سفارت جمهوری اسلامی افغانستان
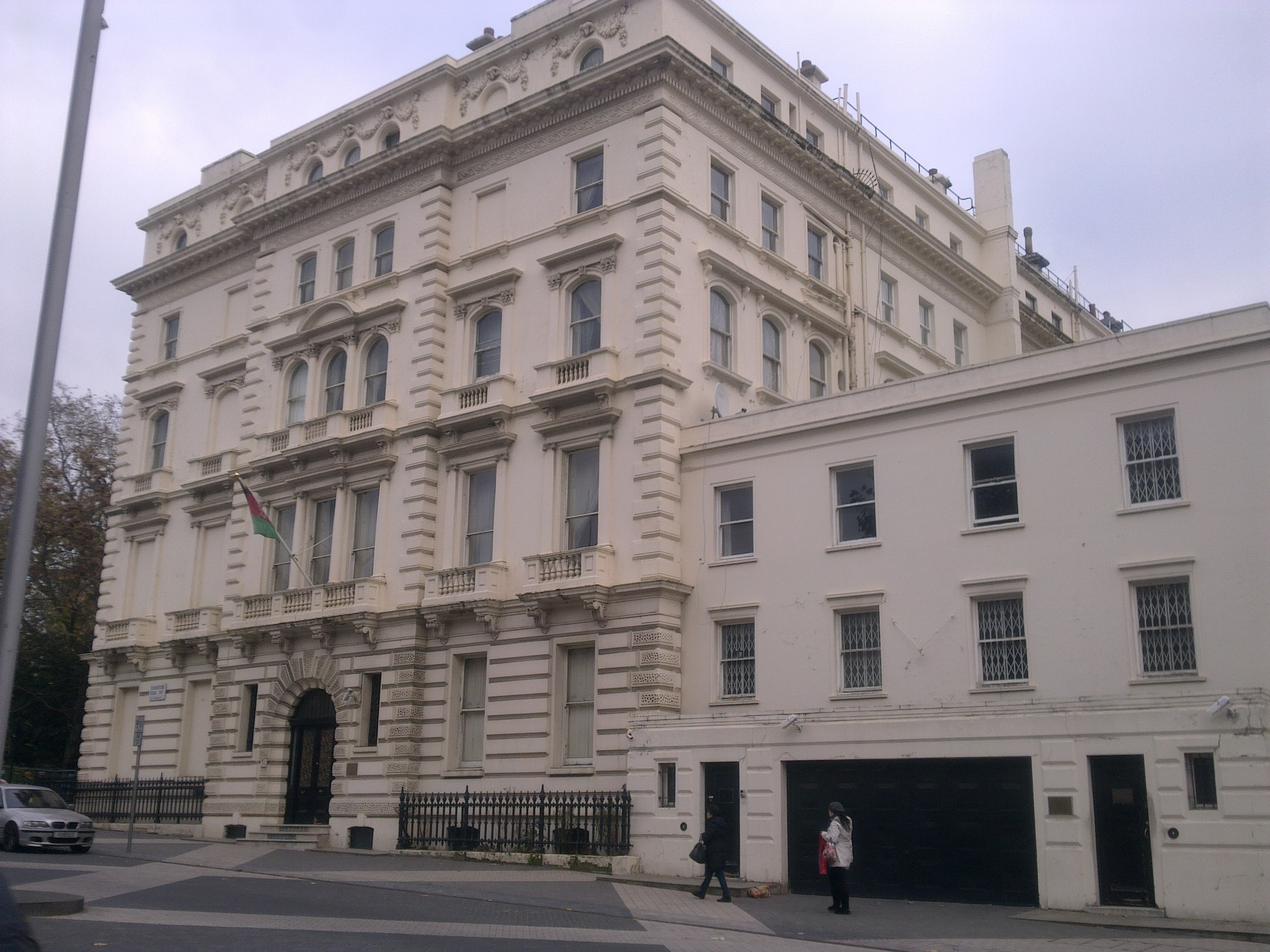
- Location: South Kensington, London
- Address: 31 Princes Gate, London, SW7 1QQ
- Coordinates: 51°30′5.04″N 0°10′27.48″W
- Closed: 27 September 2024
- Website: http://afghanistanembassy.org.uk/english/

The Embassy of Afghanistan in London (Pashto: د افغانستان اسلامي جمهوری سفارت; Dari: سفارت جمهوری اسلامی افغانستان) was the primary diplomatic mission of the Islamic Republic of Afghanistan to the United Kingdom. The building formerly occupied by the embassy is located at 31 Princes Gate in London's South Kensington district.

The building was constructed by Charles James Freake in the late 1850s.

Earlier residents include the industrialist Charles Wright, chairman of Baldwins, and George Whiteley, 1st Baron Marchamley.

Afghanistan bought this building in 1925.

The embassy was forced to close by the British government on 27 September 2024.

== Gallery ==
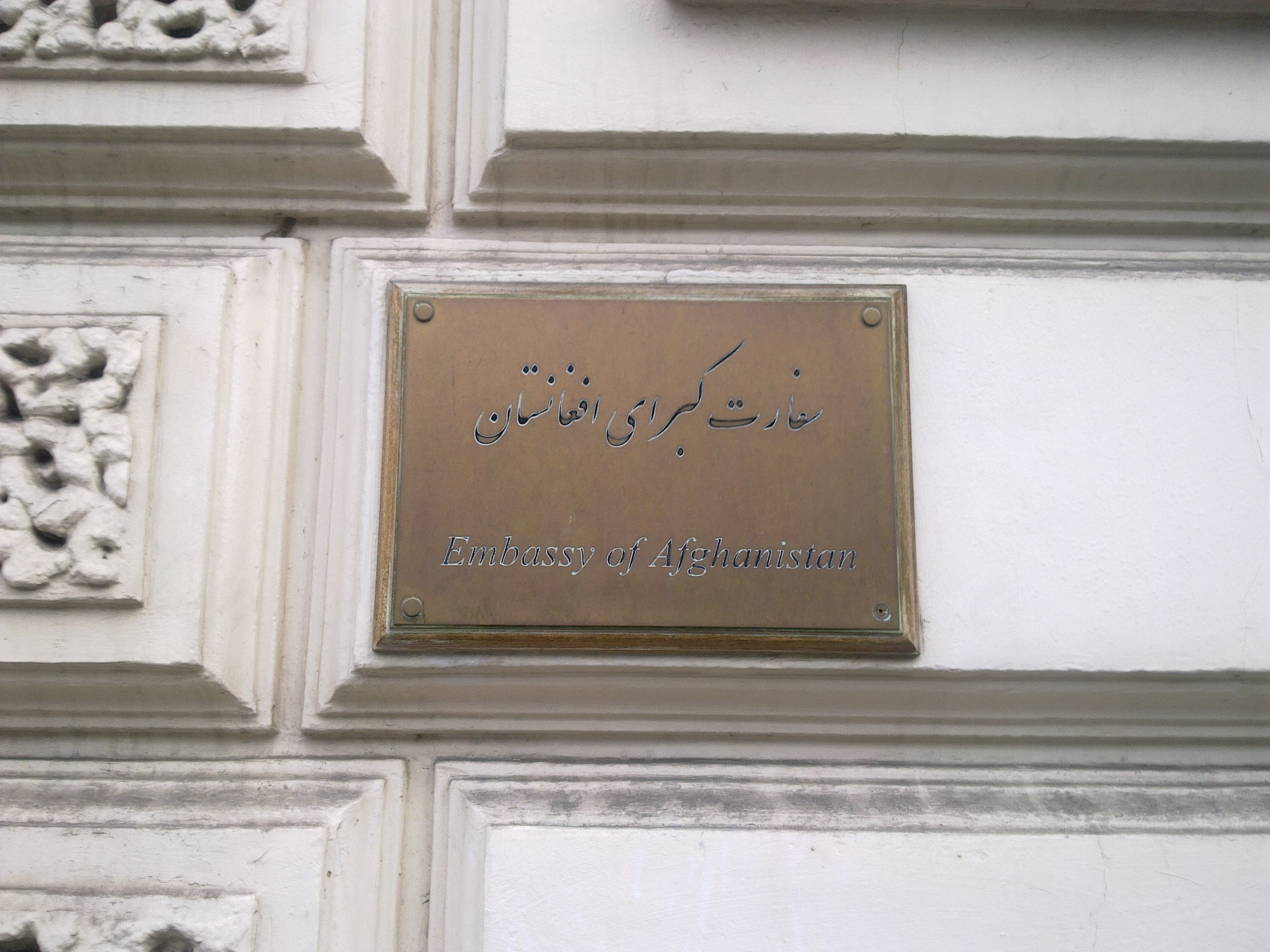
Plaque outside the embassy in Dari and English

== See also ==
- List of diplomatic missions in London
- Afghanistan–United Kingdom relations
- Embassy of the United Kingdom, Kabul
- Ambassadors of the United Kingdom to Afghanistan
- Category:Ambassadors of Afghanistan to the United Kingdom
