= Foreign relations of Afghanistan =

The foreign relations of Afghanistan are in a transitional phase since 2021, in the aftermath of the fall of Kabul to the Taliban and the collapse of the internationally recognized Islamic Republic of Afghanistan. The new Taliban-led government has been recognised by one country, Russia, and some countries have engaged in informal diplomatic contact with the Islamic Emirate, formal relations remain limited to representatives of the Islamic Republic.

== History ==
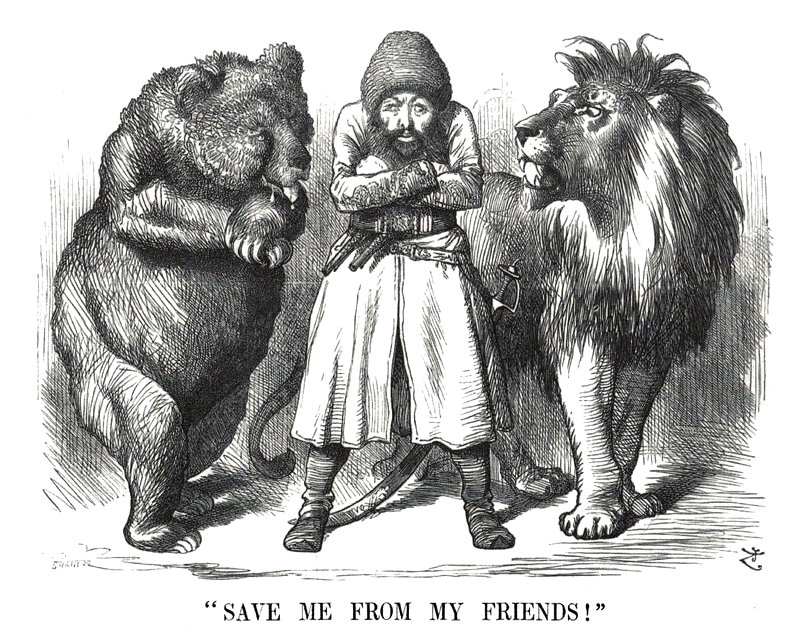
A depiction of Britain (the lion) and Russia (the bear) contesting Afghanistan (Sher Ali Khan).

In the 19th century, Afghanistan had to contend with aggression on multiple sides, as it became part of the Great Game confrontation between Britain and Russia.

=== Contemporary era ===
Before the Soviet invasion, Afghanistan pursued a policy of neutrality and non-alignment in its foreign relations, being one of the few independent nations to stay neutral in both World War I and World War II. In international forums, Afghanistan generally followed the voting patterns of Asian and African non-aligned countries. During the 1950s and 1960s, Afghanistan was able to use the Soviet and American need for allies during the Cold War as a way to receive economic assistance from both countries. However, given that unlike the Soviet Union, the United States refused to give extensive military aid to the country, the government of Daoud Khan developed warmer ties with the USSR while officially remaining non-aligned. Following the coup of April 1978, the government under Nur Muhammad Taraki developed significantly closer ties with the Soviet Union and its communist satellites.

After the December 1979 Soviet invasion, Afghanistan's foreign policy mirrored that of the Soviet Union. Afghan foreign policymakers attempted, with little success, to increase their regime's low standing in the non-communist world. With the signing of the Geneva Accords, President Najibullah unsuccessfully sought to end the Democratic Republic of Afghanistan's isolation within the Islamic world and in the Non-Aligned Movement.

Most Western countries, including the United States, maintained small diplomatic missions in the Afghan capital Kabul during the Soviet occupation. Many countries subsequently closed their missions due to instability and heavy fighting in Kabul after the Soviet withdrawal in 1989.

Many countries initially welcomed the introduction of the Taliban regime, who they saw as a stabilising, law-enforcing alternative to the warlords who had ruled the country since the fall of Najibullah's government in 1992. The Taliban soon alienated itself as knowledge of the harsh Sharia law being enforced in Taliban-controlled territories spread around the world. The brutality towards women who attempted to work, learn, or leave the house without a male escort caused outside aid to the war-torn country to be limited.

=== Islamic Republic of Afghanistan ===
Following the October 2001 American invasion and the Bonn Agreement the new government under the leadership of Hamid Karzai started to re-establish diplomatic relationships with many countries who had held close diplomatic relations before the communist coup d'état and the subsequent civil war.

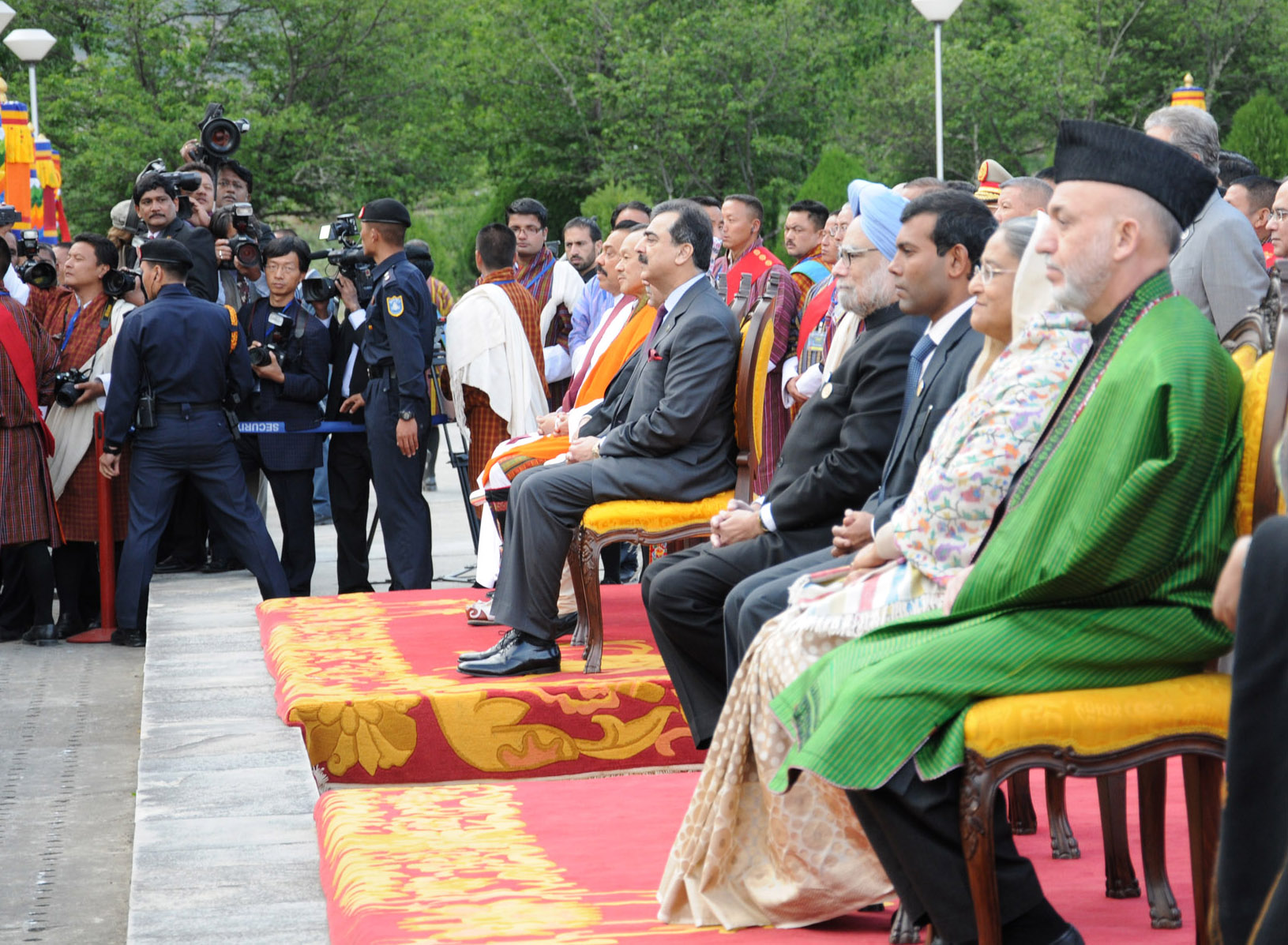
Hamid Kazarai in Bhutan, 2010

The Afghan government was focused on securing continued assistance for rebuilding the economy, infrastructure, and military of the country. It continued to maintain close ties with North America, the European Union, South Korea, Japan, Australia, India, Pakistan, China, Russia and the Greater Middle East (most specifically Turkey), as well as African nations. It also sought to establish relations with more South American or Latin American nations.

Before the fall of Kabul in 2021, the foreign relations of Afghanistan were handled by the nation's Ministry of Foreign Affairs, which was headed by Mohammad Hanif Atmar. He answered to, and received guidance from, the President of Afghanistan.

=== Islamic Emirate of Afghanistan ===
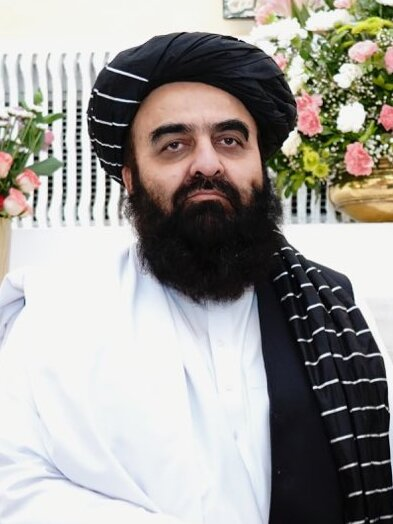
Foreign Minister Amir Khan Muttaqi in 2025

The Taliban gradually gained control of the country in the summer of 2021 and proclaimed the Islamic Emirate of Afghanistan on August 15, 2021. The takeover culminated with the fall of Kabul. The Taliban has had some limited contact with foreign governments and will need to develop further relations with the international community as its new de facto government goes forward.

On 20 September 2021, the new government designated Mohammad Suhail Shaheen as a replacement for Ghulam M Isaczai, Permanent Representative of Afghanistan to the United Nations who continues to represent the country at the UN. The UNGA's nine-member credentials committee will decide on this but no date has been set.

Since the Taliban took over the Afghan government, countries including China, Russia, and the United States have contacted Taliban representatives, but have expressed doubts about its commitment to counterterrorism. Border clashes between the Taliban forces with Pakistan, Iran and Turkmenistan, and border closure and hostilities towards Tajikistan, have also caused friction with Afghanistan's neighbours.

In September 2023, China became the first country to formally name a new ambassador to the country since the takeover, even though China still does not formally recognize the Taliban.

On 3 July 2025, Russia become the first country to formally recognise the Taliban as the government of Afghanistan since the Taliban took over the country since 2021.

== Diplomatic relations ==
List of countries which claim to maintain diplomatic relations with Afghanistan:

#	Country	Date
1	Russia	27 May 1919
2	Iran	2 May 1920
3	Italy	3 June 1921
4	United Kingdom	22 November 1921
5	France	28 April 1922
6	Belgium	26 February 1923
7	Turkey	24 February 1926
8	Poland	3 November 1927
9	Egypt	10 March 1928
10	Switzerland	20 April 1928
11	Finland	15 December 1930
12	Japan	26 July 1931
13	Saudi Arabia	5 May 1932
14	Iraq	20 December 1932
15	United States	4 May 1935
16	Czech Republic	13 October 1937
17	Sweden	22 November 1940
18	India	10 December 1947
19	Jordan	5 February 1948
20	Pakistan	29 February 1948
21	Syria	2 August 1948
22	Lebanon	August 1948
23	Indonesia	20 May 1950
24	Austria	30 April 1952
25	Brazil	1952
26	Thailand	23 April 1953
27	Germany	22 December 1954
28	Serbia	30 December 1954
29	China	20 January 1955
30	Hungary	18 May 1956
31	Netherlands	2 August 1956
32	Myanmar	8 November 1956
33	Sudan	18 May 1957
34	Romania	5 June 1958
35	Spain	28 October 1958
36	Sri Lanka	1 November 1958
37	Argentina	24 October 1959
38	Bulgaria	12 June 1961
39	Mexico	1 July 1961
40	Nepal	27 June 1961
41	Ghana	2 August 1961
42	Mongolia	1 February 1962
43	Chile	11 September 1962
44	Norway	3 January 1964
45	Kuwait	4 March 1964
46	Denmark	26 January 1966
47	Philippines	17 September 1968
48	Morocco	5 March 1969
49	Australia	30 March 1969
50	Canada	17 July 1969
51	Algeria	December 1969
52	Malaysia	24 January 1970
53	Yemen	11 March 1971
54	Libya	1 August 1971
55	Bahrain	1 June 1972
56	Qatar	16 January 1973
57	Bangladesh	18 February 1973
58	Senegal	20 February 1973
59	United Arab Emirates	6 April 1973
60	North Korea	26 December 1973
61	South Korea	31 December 1973
62	Vietnam	16 September 1974
63	Cuba	23 September 1975
64	Portugal	14 April 1976
65	Mauritania	July 1976
66	Ethiopia	6 September 1981
67	Grenada	11 March 1983
68	Laos	11 March 1983
69	Nicaragua	12 March 1983
70	Benin	5 December 1984
71	Mozambique	7 January 1985
72	Zimbabwe	31 March 1987
73	Cyprus	1987
74	Togo	1987
75	Zambia	December 1988
76	Colombia	3 August 1990
77	Ecuador	23 August 1990
78	Namibia	3 October 1990
79	Uruguay	4 October 1990
80	Venezuela	10 December 1990
81	Kazakhstan	12 February 1992
82	Turkmenistan	21 February 1992
83	Tajikistan	15 July 1992
84	Uzbekistan	13 October 1992
85	Georgia	12 July 1994
86	South Africa	19 September 1994
87	Azerbaijan	16 November 1994
88	Moldova	1 December 1994
89	Ukraine	17 April 1995
90	Croatia	3 January 1996
91	North Macedonia	17 July 1996
92	Armenia	5 September 1996
93	Belarus	15 June 1999
94	Kyrgyzstan	12 November 1999
—	Sovereign Military Order of Malta	1999
95	Panama	3 May 2002
96	Ireland	19 September 2002
97	New Zealand	7 May 2003
98	Iceland	17 March 2004
99	Slovenia	20 September 2004
100	Greece	2004
101	Luxembourg	13 January 2005
102	Lithuania	11 March 2005
103	Oman	25 March 2005
104	Estonia	1 July 2005
105	Bosnia and Herzegovina	20 September 2005
106	Latvia	18 December 2005
107	Maldives	17 March 2006
108	Andorra	29 March 2006
109	Singapore	22 June 2006
110	Albania	16 August 2006
111	Brunei	14 February 2007
112	Malta	18 February 2008
113	Bhutan	20 April 2010
114	Fiji	4 June 2010
115	Montenegro	21 September 2010
116	Monaco	13 October 2010
117	Dominican Republic	3 December 2011
118	Slovakia	17 January 2012
119	Peru	27 September 2012
120	Nigeria	16 April 2013
—	Kosovo	17 June 2013
121	Seychelles	24 February 2017
122	Liechtenstein	26 October 2018
123	Dominica	27 April 2021
124	Cambodia	Unknown
—	State of Palestine	Unknown
125	Tunisia	Unknown

== Bilateral relations ==
=== Afro-Asia ===
Country	Formal relations began	Notes
Algeria	December 1969	Both countries established diplomatic relations in December 1969.
Armenia	5 September 1996	Both countries established diplomatic relations on 5 September 1996.: Afghanistan is accredited to Armenia from its embassy in Moscow, Russia.; Armenia is accredited to Afghanistan from its embassy in Ashgabat, Turkmenistan.
Azerbaijan	16 November 1994	The two countries established diplomatic relations on 16 November 1994.: Afghanistan has an embassy in Baku.; Azerbaijan to build its embassy in Kabul in the near future.
Bahrain	1 June 1972	Both countries established diplomatic relations on 1 June 1972.
Bangladesh		See Afghanistan–Bangladesh relations: Afghanistan has an embassy in Dhaka.
Benin	5 December 1984	Both countries established diplomatic relations on 5 December 1984.
Bhutan	20 April 2010	Both countries established diplomatic relations on 20 April 2010.
Brunei Darussalam	14 February 2007	Both countries established diplomatic relations on 14 February 2007.
China	20 January 1955	Both countries established diplomatic relations on 20 January 1955. See Afghanistan–China relations: Afghanistan has an embassy in Beijing.; China has an embassy in Kabul.
Egypt	10 May 1928	Both countries established diplomatic relations on 10 May 1928.: Afghanistan has an embassy in Cairo.; Egypt has an embassy in Kabul.
Georgia	12 July 1994	Both countries established diplomatic relations on 12 July 1994.
India	10 December 1947	See Afghanistan–India relations Both countries established diplomatic relations on 10 December 1947. India had traditionally enjoyed friendly relations with Afghanistan. Despite that, India supported the Soviet invasion and occupation of Afghanistan. Relations deteriorated after the Taliban took power in 1996. India unofficially supported the Northern Alliance minority groups against the Pakistani-backed Taliban. During the course of the hijack of Indian Airlines Flight 814 in 1999, the Taliban requested recognition by India in exchange for help in negotiations. The request was not acted upon by the Indian government. After the fall of the Taliban in late 2001, India strengthened ties with the Islamic Republic of Afghanistan by establishing consulates in most major Afghan cities. India had participated in multiple socio-economic reconstruction efforts, including power, roads, agricultural and educational projects. Some of these include building dozens of dams and reservoirs, a number of hospitals or clinics, schools and government institutions. The long road from Bandar-Abbas in southern Iran to highway 1 in southern Afghanistan was carried out by state-owned Border Roads Organisation (BRO), the mission statement of which states that the BRO is India's "most reputed, multifaceted, transnational, modern construction organization committed to meeting the strategic needs of the armed forces." The killing of a BRO employee by the neo-Taliban in 2005 prompted the Indian authorities to dispatch approximately 200 Indo-Tibetan Border Police commandos to in 2006 to provide security for Indians working in various construction projects in Afghanistan. Political contacts between India and Afghanistan had increased in 2011, especially after the death of Osama bin Laden in Pakistan. During Indian Prime Minister Manmohan Singh's May 2011 visit to Kabul, it was announced that India's total aid to Afghanistan reached $2 billion after a package of $500 million was added. There was also military ties between Afghanistan and India, which is expected to increase after the October 2011 strategic pact that was signed by President Karzai and Manmohan Singh. India's the largest regional provider of humanitarian and reconstruction aid to Afghanistan.: Afghanistan has an embassy in New Delhi and a consulate-general in Mumbai.; India had an embassy in Kabul and consulates-general in Herat, Jalalabad, Kandahar and Mazar-e-Sharif.
Indonesia	20 May 1950	See Afghanistan–Indonesia relations Both countries established diplomatic relations on 20 May 1950 when Minister of Indonesia to Afghanistan Major-General R. H. Abdul Kadir presented his credentials.: Afghanistan has an embassy in Jakarta.; Indonesia has an embassy in Kabul.
Iran	2 May 1920	See Afghanistan–Iran relations Both countries established diplomatic relations on 2 May 1920 when has been accredited first Envoy Extraordinary and Minister Plenipotentiary of Afghanistan to Persia Sardar Abdol Aziz Khan. Afghanistan's relations with Iran have fluctuated over the last decades, with periodic disputes over the water rights of the Helmand River as one of the main issues of contention. Following the Soviet invasion of Afghanistan and the Iranian Revolution, relations deteriorated. Iran supported the cause of the Afghan resistance and provided limited assistance to the ethnic Hazara rebel leaders who pledged loyalty to the Iranian Revolution. After the emergence of the Taliban, Iran stepped up assistance to the Northern Alliance minority ethnic groups. Iran did not have any form of relations with the Taliban. In 1998, when the Taliban captured the northern Afghan city of Mazar-i-Sharif, several Iranian diplomats were executed on espionage charges. Since 2002, the new Afghan government has engaged in cordial relations with both Iran and the United States, even as relations between Iran and the United States have grown strained due to American objections to Iran's nuclear program. While Iran is helping to develop the Afghan Shia communities, the NATO officials have been accusing Iran of secretly arming and training the Taliban insurgents. Iran is accused of playing a double game in Afghanistan, a helper to the Afghan Shias and a destabilizer for the larger Sunni Afghans. In 2010, several high-level Iranian officials openly voiced for a failed Afghanistan. Ties between Afghanistan and Iran became strained in recent years due to Iran's toughened immigration policy, hastening the repatriation of many Afghan asylum seekers. Although Iran has hosted large numbers of Afghan refugees since the early 1980s, it is seeking to repatriate the remaining ones back to Afghanistan as soon as possible. A number of Afghans were executed by hanging in the streets of Iran, which sparked angry demonstrations in Afghanistan. There have reports about Iran's Revolutionary Guards training Afghans inside Iran to carry out terrorist attacks in Afghanistan. "Currently, the Revolutionary Guards recruit young people for terrorist activities in Afghanistan and try to revive the Hezb-i-Islami Afghanistan led by Gulbadin Hekmatyar and Taliban groups" — Syed Kamal, a self-confessed agent for Iran's Revolutionary Guards and member of Sipah-i-Mohmmad: Afghanistan has an embassy in Tehran and consulates-general in Mashhad and Zahedan.; Iran has an embassy in Kabul and consulates-general in Herat, Kandahar and Mazar-i-Sharif.
Iraq	20 December 1932	Both countries established diplomatic relations on 20 December 1932.: Afghanistan has an embassy in Baghdad.; Iraq has an embassy in Kabul.
Israel		See Afghanistan–Israel relations No formal relations between Afghanistan and Israel exist, as Afghanistan does not recognize Israel. However, leaders of both nations have met on numerous occasions.
Japan	26 July 1931	See Afghanistan–Japan relations Both countries established diplomatic relations on 26 July 1931.: Afghanistan has an embassy in Tokyo.; Japan has an embassy in Kabul.
Jordan	5 February 1948	Both countries established diplomatic relations on 5 February 1948 when Minister of Jordan to Afghanistan Mohammed Pasha El Shureiki presented his credentials.
Kazakhstan	12 February 1992	See Afghanistan–Kazakhstan relations Both countries established diplomatic relations on 12 February 1992.: Afghanistan has an embassy in Astana and a consulate-general in Almaty.; Kazakhstan has an embassy in Kabul.
Kuwait	4 March 1964	Both countries established diplomatic relations on 4 March 1964.
Kyrgyzstan	12 November 1999	Both countries established diplomatic relations on 12 November 1999.: Afghanistan has an embassy in Bishkek.; Kyrgyzstan has an embassy in Kabul.
Laos	11 March 1983	Both countries established diplomatic relations on 11 March 1983.
Lebanon	August 1948	Both countries established diplomatic relations in August 1948 when has been accredited Minister of Afghanistan to Lebanon (Resident in Bagdad) Mr. Ghulam Yahya Tarzi.
Libya	1 August 1971	Both countries established diplomatic relations on 1 August 1971.
Malaysia	24 January 1970	Both countries established diplomatic relations on 24 January 1970.: Afghanistan has a resident embassy in Kuala Lumpur; Malaysia is represented in Afghanistan by its embassy (high commission) in New Delhi
Maldives	17 March 2006	Both countries established diplomatic relations on 17 March 2006.
Mongolia	1 February 1962	See Afghanistan–Mongolia relations Both countries established diplomatic relations on 1 February 1962
Morocco	10 March 1973	Both countries established diplomatic relations on 10 March 1973
Mozambique	7 January 1985	Both countries established diplomatic relations on 7 January 1985.
Myanmar	8 November 1956	Both countries established diplomatic relations on 8 November 1956.
Namibia	3 October 1990	Both countries established diplomatic relations on 3 October 1990.
Nepal	1 July 1961	See Afghanistan–Nepal relations Both countries established diplomatic relations on 1 July 1961.
North Korea	26 December 1973	Both countries established diplomatic relations on 26 December 1973.
Oman	25 March 2005	Both countries established diplomatic relations on 25 March 2005.
Pakistan	29 February 1948	See Afghanistan–Pakistan relations Both countries established diplomatic relations on 29 February 1948. Afghanistan began diplomatic ties with Pakistan in 1947, when Pakistan became an independent state after the Partition of India. Khyber Pakhtunkhwa, FATA and Balochistan have long complicated Afghanistan's relations with Pakistan. Controversies involving these areas date back to the establishment of the Durand Line border in 1893 which divided the Pashtun and Baloch tribes. Although shown on most maps as the western international border of Pakistan, it is unrecognized by Afghanistan. From September 1961 to June 1963, diplomatic relations, trade, transit, and consular services were suspended by Pakistan. The April 1978 Marxist revolution further strained relations between the two states. Pakistan took the lead diplomatically in the United Nations, the Non-Aligned Movement, and the Organisation of the Islamic Conference in opposing the Soviet invasion. It feared that after Afghanistan the Soviets would then enter Pakistani territory, especially the Balochistan region next to the oil-riched Persian Gulf. The United States was more fearing that Soviet reach to the Persian Gulf would threaten or suspend Arab oil supply so it began Operation Cyclone to provide billions of dollars to Pakistan for the training of Mujahideen against the Soviet-backed Democratic Republic of Afghanistan. The United States and Saudi Arabia provided as much as $40 billion to Pakistan. Supported and funded by the UNHCR, about 3 million Afghan refugees were allowed to stay in Pakistan, most of them in Khyber Pakhtunkhwa. Pakistan developed closer ties with the Taliban government in 1996, which it believed would offer strategic depth in any future conflict with India, and extended recognition in 1997. Following Operation Enduring Freedom in late 2001, when the Taliban government was toppled, Pakistan recognized the new Karzai administration and offered around $250 million in aid for reconstruction of the war-torn country. This includes the rebuilding and expansion of the major roads linking Afghanistan with Pakistan, the construction of Jinnah Hospital in Kabul and the Allama Iqbal Faculty of Arts building at Kabul University. Much of Afghanistan has long relied on Pakistani links for trade and travel to the outside world, and Pakistan views Afghanistan as its primary route for trade with Central Asia. In late 2010, the long-awaited Afghanistan Pakistan Transit Trade Act (APTTA) was finally signed by the two states. It took effect in June 2011, which is intended to improve economic ties. As of 2011, Afghan-Pakistani political ties continue to decline from bad to worse. This is mainly due to the recent Afghanistan–Pakistan border skirmishes, escalating Taliban insurgency which is alleged to be supported and guided by Pakistan's Inter-Services Intelligence (ISI) spy network, and the growing influence of its rival India in Afghanistan. The Taliban appointed Mohammad Shokaib as first secretary or chargé d'affaires of Afghanistan's embassy in Pakistan. Since Pakistan does not formally recognize the Taliban government, Shokaib will not hold the formal title of ambassador.: Afghanistan has an embassy in Islamabad and consulates-general in Karachi, Peshawar and Quetta.; Pakistan has an embassy in Kabul and consulates-general in Herat, Jalalabad, Kandahar and Mazar-i-Sharif.
Philippines	17 September 1968	Both countries established diplomatic relations on 17 September 1968.: Afghanistan is accredited to the Philippines from its embassy in Tokyo, Japan.; The Philippines is accredited to Afghanistan from its embassy in Islamabad, Pakistan.
Qatar	16 January 1973	Both countries established diplomatic relations on 16 January 1973.
Saudi Arabia	5 May 1932	See Afghanistan–Saudi Arabia relations Both countries established diplomatic relations on 5 May 1932. Saudi Arabia has exerted a strong influence on Afghanistan, and was one of the major provider of funds to the mujahideen fighters against the Soviets. Saudi Arabia was also the second of only three countries to recognize the Taliban government, extending official recognition on 26 May 1997, one day after Pakistan and shortly before the United Arab Emirates. After the removal of Taliban, Saudi Arabia is one of the major helpers in the Afghan reconstruction. For example, the main highway project is funded mainly by the US and Saudi Arabia. The largest mosque in Afghanistan was also financed by Saudi Arabia.: Afghanistan has an embassy in Riyadh and a consulate-general in Jeddah.; Saudi Arabia has an embassy in Kabul.
Seychelles	24 February 2017	Both countries established diplomatic relations on 24 February 2017.
Singapore	22 June 2006	Both countries established diplomatic relations on 22 June 2006.: Afghanistan is accredited to Singapore from its embassy in Tokyo, Japan.; Singapore does not have an accreditation to Afghanistan.
South Africa	19 September 1994	Both countries established diplomatic relations on 19 September 1994.: Afghanistan does not have an accreditation to South Africa.; South Africa is accredited to Afghanistan from its embassy in Islamabad, Pakistan.
South Korea	31 December 1973	See Afghanistan–South Korea relations Both countries established diplomatic relations on 31 December 1973. High-level Exchanges From Afghanistan to the South Korea 2010 Mar Farahi (Deputy Foreign Minister) 2012 Nov Ludin (Deputy Foreign Minister) 2013 Feb Khalili (2nd Vice President) 2013 Jul Najafi (Minister of Transport) 2013 Aug Raheen (Minister of Culture) 2013 Oct Sangin (Minister of Telecommunication).: Afghanistan has an embassy in Seoul.; South Korea has an embassy in Kabul.
Sri Lanka	1 November 1958	Both countries established diplomatic relations on 1 November 1958.
Sudan	18 May 1957	Both countries established diplomatic relations on 18 May 1957.
Syria	18 November 1951	Both countries established diplomatic relations on 18 November 1951 when has been accredited Chargé d'Affaires ad interim of Afghanistan to Syria (Resident in Bagdad) Mr. Mir Amanullah Rahimi.
Tajikistan	15 July 1992	See Afghanistan–Tajikistan relations Both countries established diplomatic relations on 15 July 1992.: Afghanistan has an embassy in Dushanbe and a consulate-general in Kharogh.; Tajikistan has an embassy in Kabul.
Thailand	23 April 1953	Both countries established diplomatic relations on 23 April 1953.
Turkey	1 March 1921	See Afghanistan–Turkey relations Both countries established diplomatic relations on 1 March 1921: Afghanistan has an embassy in Ankara and a Consulates General in Istanbul.; Turkey has an embassy in Kabul and Consulates General in Kandahar and Mazar-e Sharif.; Both countries are members of Asia Cooperation Dialogue, Economic Cooperation Organization, OIC and WTO.; Trade volume between the two countries was US$180 million in 2019 (Afghan exports/imports: 156/24 million USD).; Yunus Emre Institute has a local headquarters in Kabul.; Afghanistan was the second country to recognize the Republic of Turkey on 1 March 1923, after the Soviet Union, establishing diplomatic contacts whilst the Turkish War of Independence was still being waged. Talks held in Moscow on 1 March 1921 resulted in the Turkey-Afghanistan Alliance Agreement and a period of intense cooperation. In 1937, shortly before the outbreak of World War II, Afghanistan, Iran, Iraq and Turkey signed the Treaty of Saadabad. Since the 1920s Turkey enjoyed its prestige in Afghanistan. Both countries established education and cultural exchange programs. Inside Afghanistan Turkish schools were established. Furthermore, Turkish army officers assisted or even commanded the training of Afghan military members. The foreign relations of Afghanistan have changed so much politically, socially and economically. Today the relations between the two countries go beyond giving military education. In this respect it is noteworthy that this article handles the developments in the relationship between Afghanistan and Turkey in historical context. Afghan and Turkish relations spans several centuries, as many Turkic and Afghan peoples ruled vast areas of Central Asia and the Middle East particularly the Ghaznavids, Khalji, Timurid, Lodhi, Mughal, Afsharid, and Durrani empires. Throughout its long history, many Ottoman officials were in close contact with Afghan leaders even up until the early 20th century when the Ottoman administrator Ahmad Jamal Pasha went to Afghanistan where he worked on modernizing the Afghan Armed Forces. Turkey has participated in the International Security Assistance Force (ISAF) since its inception with the deployment of 290- non-combatant support personnel in 2001 and has assumed command of ISAF II (June 2002 – February 2003) and ISAF VII (February–August 2005). According to Turkish Parliamentary Deputy Burhan Kayatürk; Turkey, which has the goodwill of the Afghani people, "can help win the hearts and minds of the Afghani people", who, "like the Turkish soldiers", and, "steer them away from militancy by strengthening the infrastructure in education, health and industry". Turkish troops have not participated as combat forces but rather as logistical support and training Afghan personnel. Over 12,000 Afghan soldiers and police have been trained. Turkish construction firms have subsequently also become active in the country. Turkey is responsible for maintaining security around Kabul, providing training for the Afghan National Army and Afghan National Police and have undertaken a number of reconstruction projects in the fields of education, health and agriculture in the province of Vardak. Turkey's support of the Bonn Agreement and the Afghan Constitution Commission resulted in an official visit to Turkey by Afghan President Hamid Karzai on 4 April 2002 and made a reciprocal visit to Afghanistan by Turkish Prime Minister Recep Tayyip Erdoğan a short time later.: Afghanistan has an embassy in Ankara and a consulate-general in Istanbul.; Turkey has an embassy in Kabul and a consulate-general in Mazar-i-Sharif.
Turkmenistan	21 February 1992	See Afghanistan–Turkmenistan relations Both countries established diplomatic relations on 21 February 1992.: Afghanistan has an embassy in Ashgabat and a consulate-general in Mary.; Turkmenistan has an embassy in Kabul and consulates in Herat and Mazar-i-Sharif.
United Arab Emirates	6 April 1973	See Afghanistan–United Arab Emirates relations: Afghanistan has an embassy in Abu Dhabi and a consulate-general in Dubai.; United Arab Emirates has an embassy in Kabul.
Uzbekistan	13 October 1992	See Afghanistan–Uzbekistan relations Both countries established diplomatic relations on 13 October 1992. After the independence of Uzbekistan in 1991, the coming upheavals in Afghanistan and in Tajikistan caused security issues and regional anxiety. Uzbekistan continued this policy for a long time, but in 2016 started boosting relations with Afghanistan in terms of trade, socio-cultural and educational exchanges.: Afghanistan has an embassy in Tashkent and a consulate-general in both Bukhara and Termez.; Uzbekistan has an embassy in Kabul and a consulate in Mazar-i-Sharif.
Vietnam	16 September 1974	See Afghanistan–Vietnam relations: Afghanistan is accredited to Vietnam from its embassy in Beijing, China.; Vietnam is accredited to Afghanistan from its embassy in Islamabad, Pakistan.
Yemen	11 March 1971	Both countries established diplomatic relations on 11 March 1971: Afghanistan is accredited to Yemen from its embassy in Riyadh, Saudi Arabia.; Yemen does not have an accreditation to Afghanistan
Zimbabwe	31 March 1987	Both countries established diplomatic relations on 31 March 1987.; Afghanistan currently does not have an accreditation to Zimbabwe.; Zimbabwe is accredited to Afghanistan from its embassy in Tehran, Iran.
Zambia	December 1988	Zambia is accredited to Afghanistan from its embassy in Beijing, China.

=== Americas ===
Country	Formal Relations Began	Notes
Argentina	24 October 1959	Both countries established diplomatic relations on 24 October 1959.: Afghanistan is accredited to Argentina from its embassy in Washington, D.C., United States.; Argentina is accredited to Afghanistan from its embassy in Islamabad, Pakistan.
Brazil	1952	Both countries established diplomatic relations in 1952.: Afghanistan is accredited to Brazil from its embassy in Washington, D.C., United States.; Brazil is accredited to Afghanistan from its embassy in Islamabad, Pakistan.
Canada	17 July 1968	See Afghanistan–Canada relations Both countries established diplomatic relations on 17 July 1968. Canadian Ambassador William Crosbie makes remarks during the opening of the refurbished Turquoise Mountain Foundation in Kabul on 9 May 2011. The September 11, 2001, attacks in the U.S. prompted Canada to re-evaluate its policies toward Afghanistan. The Minister of National Defence Art Eggleton advised Governor General Adrienne Clarkson to authorize more than 100 Canadian Forces members serving on military exchange programs in the United States and other countries to participate in U.S. operations in Afghanistan. Although not participating in the opening days of the invasion, Prime Minister Jean Chrétien announced on 7 October that Canada would contribute forces to the international force being formed to conduct a campaign against terrorism. General Ray Henault, the Chief of the Defence Staff, issued preliminary orders to several Canadian Forces units, as Operation Apollo was established. The Canadian commitment was originally planned to last to October 2003.: Afghanistan has an embassy in Ottawa and consulates-general in Toronto and Vancouver.; Canada had an embassy in Kabul. It was closed in 2021 after the Fall of Kabul.
Chile	11 September 1962	Both countries established diplomatic relations on 11 September 1962: Afghanistan is accredited to Chile from its embassy in Washington D.C., United States.; Chile does not have an accreditation to Afghanistan.
Colombia	3 August 1990	See Afghanistan–Colombia relations Both countries established diplomatic relations on 3 August 1990.: Afghanistan is accredited to Colombia from its embassy in Washington, D.C., United States.; Colombia is accredited to Afghanistan from its embassy in New Delhi, India.
Cuba	23 September 1975	Both countries established diplomatic relations on 23 September 1975.
Dominica	22 April 2021	Both countries established diplomatic relations on 22 April 2021.
Dominican Republic	3 December 2011	Both countries established diplomatic relations on 3 December 2011.
Ecuador	23 August 1990	Both countries established diplomatic relations on 23 August 1990.
Grenada	11 March 1983	Both countries established diplomatic relations on 11 March 1983.
Mexico	27 June 1961	See Afghanistan–Mexico relations Both countries established diplomatic relations on 27 June 1961.: Afghanistan is accredited to Mexico from its embassy in Washington, D.C., United States.; Mexico is accredited to Afghanistan from its embassy in Tehran, Iran.
Panama	3 May 2002	Both countries established diplomatic relations on 3 May 2002.
Peru	27 September 2012	Both countries established diplomatic relations on 27 September 2012.
United States	4 May 1935	See Afghanistan–United States relations Both countries established diplomatic relations on 4 May 1935. Official diplomatic relations between Afghanistan and the United States began in the 1920s, although contact between the two nations was made in the late 1830s with the visit of Josiah Harlan. Residing in Tehran, William Harrison Hornibrook served as a non-resident U.S. Envoy (Minister Plenipotentiary) to Afghanistan from 1935 to 1936. The United States established its first official Kabul Legation in 1942, which was elevated to the Kabul Embassy in 1948. Louis Goethe Dreyfus, who previously served as Minister Plenipotentiary, became the U.S. Ambassador to Afghanistan from 1949 to 1951. The first official Afghanistan Ambassador to the United States was Habibullah Khan Tarzi who served from 1948 to 1953. Since the 1950s the U.S. extended an economic assistance program focused on the development of Afghanistan's physical infrastructure which included roads, dams, and power plants. Later, U.S. aid shifted from infrastructure projects to technical assistance programs to help develop the skills needed to build a modern economy. Dwight D. Eisenhower visited Kabul in December 1959, becoming the first U.S. president to travel to Afghanistan. The Peace Corps was active in Afghanistan between 1962 and 1979. During the early 1960s King of Afghanistan, Zahir Shah, visited the United States and met with John F. Kennedy. Embassy of Afghanistan in Washington, D.C. After the April 1978 coup, relations deteriorated. In February 1979, U.S. Ambassador Adolph "Spike" Dubs was murdered in Kabul after security forces burst in on his kidnappers. The U.S. then reduced bilateral assistance and terminated a small military training program. All remaining assistance agreements were ended after the Soviet invasion of Afghanistan. Following the Soviet invasion, the United States supported diplomatic efforts to achieve a Soviet withdrawal. In addition, generous U.S. contributions to the refugee program in Pakistan played a major part in efforts to assist Afghans in need. U.S. efforts also included helping Afghans living inside Afghanistan. This cross-border humanitarian assistance program aimed at increasing Afghan self-sufficiency and helping Afghans resist Soviet attempts to drive civilians out of the rebel-dominated countryside. During the period of Soviet occupation of Afghanistan, the U.S. provided about $3 billion in military and economic assistance to the Afghan Mujahideens. Following the September 11 attacks, the United States launched an attack on the Taliban government as part of Operation Enduring Freedom. Following the overthrow of the Taliban, the U.S. supported the new Karzai administration and stationed 100,000 of U.S. troops in the country. Their aim was to help the new government of President Hamid Karzai establish authority across Afghanistan and hunt down insurgents that are launching attacks. The United States was the leading nation in the rebuilding or reconstruction of Afghanistan. It provided multi-billion US dollars in weapons and aid, as well as infrastructure development. In 2005, the United States and Afghanistan signed a strategic partnership agreement committing both nations to a long-term relationship. U.S. President George W. Bush and First Lady Laura Bush made a surprise visit to Afghanistan on 1 March 2006. Hamid Karzai was hailed as an example of a great leader by most U.S. politicians, universities and media outlets every time he visited the United States. Although, the U.S. military was to remain in Afghanistan until the end of 2014, U.S. officials offered to remain longer if the Afghan people wanted them. A US State Department report criticized the handling of the 2021 Afghanistan evacuation, highlighting the serious consequences of troop withdrawals by Presidents Biden and Trump on the security of the former US-backed government. The report raised concerns over the lack of coordination and failure to expand crisis-management efforts during the Taliban's advance on Kabul, without directly naming Secretary of State Antony Blinken. The Islamic Republic of Afghanistan collapsed and the Taliban rebuilt the Islamic emirate after the U.S. and the Taliban signed the Doha agreement and fully withdraw from Afghanistan in 2021.: Afghanistan has an embassy in Washington, D.C., and a consulates-general in Los Angeles and New York City. Temporarily closed from 2022.; United States has an embassy in Kabul, personnel located in Doha.
Uruguay	4 October 1990	Both countries established diplomatic relations on 4 October 1990.
Venezuela	10 December 1990	Both countries established diplomatic relations on 10 December 1990.

=== Europe ===
Country	Formal Relations Began	Notes
Albania	16 August 2006	Both countries established diplomatic relations on 16 August 2006.
Andorra	29 March 2006	Both countries established diplomatic relations on 29 March 2006.
Austria		Afghanistan has an embassy in Vienna.; Austria is accredited to Afghanistan from its embassy in Islamabad, Pakistan.
Belarus	15 June 1999	Both countries established diplomatic relations on 15 June 1999.
Belgium	26 February 1923	Both countries established diplomatic relations on 26 February 1923.
Bosnia and Herzegovina	20 September 2005	Both countries established diplomatic relations on 20 September 2005.
Bulgaria	12 June 1961	Both countries established diplomatic relations on 12 June 1961.: Afghanistan has an embassy in Sofia.; Bulgaria has an embassy in Kabul.
Croatia	3 January 1996	Both countries established diplomatic relations on 3 January 1996.
Czech Republic	13 October 1937	Both countries established diplomatic relations on 13 October 1937.: Afghanistan has an embassy in Prague.; Czech Republic has an embassy in Kabul.
Denmark	26 January 1966	See Afghanistan–Denmark relations Both countries established diplomatic relations on 26 January 1966. Denmark had 760 soldiers in Afghanistan in 2010, operating without caveat and concentrated in Helmand province. Relations between the two countries are friendly. Around 9,578 Afghan immigrants reside in Denmark. Diplomatic relations were established in 1947. On 24 May 1967, an air service agreement was signed in Kabul. On 2 March 1979, an agreement on a Danish loan to Afghanistan was signed. Since 2001, the Danish Defence was involved in the War in Afghanistan as part of the ISAF. The Danish Defence with the British Armed Forces have been involved in clashes with the Taliban in the Helmand Province. Denmark had two of their F-16s in the Manas Air Base, Kyrgyzstan to support their forces in Afghanistan. Danish Committee for Aid to Afghan Refugees is an organization, working in Afghanistan. The organization was created to support the Afghans, who had fled to Pakistan and Iran. Danish assistance to Afghanistan amounts $80 million each year. Since the fall of the Taleban in 2001, Denmark has supported Afghanistan with education and democratisation. In 2005, the Folketing approved 670 million DKK, to the rebuilding of Afghanistan. On 28 January 2006, the Afghan president Hamid Karzai visited Anders Fogh Rasmussen in Marienborg, the summer residence of the Danish Prime Minister. In September 2009, Danish Prime Minister Anders Fogh Rasmussen visited Camp Bastion. On 23 June 2010, Danish Prime Minister Lars Løkke Rasmussen visited Afghanistan, where he met Hamid Karzai. On 10 January 2011, Afghan Foreign Minister Zalmai Rassoul visited Denmark, to discuss bilateral relations.: Afghanistan is accredited to Denmark from its embassy in Oslo, Norway.; Denmark has an embassy in Kabul.
Estonia	1 July 2005	Both countries established diplomatic relations on 1 July 2005.
Finland	11 May 1956	Both countries established diplomatic relations on 11 May 1956.: Afghanistan recognized the Independence of Finland on 17 July 1928.; Afghanistan is accredited to Finland through its embassy in Oslo, Norway.; Finland has an embassy in Kabul.
France	28 April 1922	See Afghanistan–France relations Both countries established diplomatic relations on 28 April 1922: Afghanistan has an embassy in Paris.; France has an embassy in Kabul.
Germany	16 October 1922	See Afghanistan-Germany relations Both countries established diplomatic relations on 16 October 1922 when has been accredited first Envoy of Afghanistan to Germany Ghulam Siddiq Khan. After the Second World War, diplomatic relations were established with the Federal Republic of Germany on 22 December 1954. Afghan President Hamid Karzai in Germany, with Franz Josef Jung to his right and James L. Jones to his left. The German-Afghan relationship is long and has been mostly cordial. In 1935 under prime minister Mohammad Hashim Khan, Afghanistan established a close relationship with Germany, a distinct change of relations in comparison to its usual position between the Russian and British spheres of influence. Under this relationship, Afghanistan received German foreign aid and technical assistance, and also developed closer ties with Germany's allies, Italy, Spain and Japan. Many Afghan academics studied in Germany, many more sought refuge in Germany during the years of civil war. There has been significant cultural exchange over the years. Several of the best secondary schools in Kabul are founded and supported by the German government. The number of Afghans in Germany is about 90,000 but many others have been deported from there in the last decade. Germany has been one of the most significant donors of foreign aid and partners in the rebuilding of Afghanistan. The Bonn agreement deals with the post Taliban governance of Afghanistan.: Afghanistan has an embassy in Berlin and consulates-general in Bonn and Munich.; Germany has an embassy in Kabul.
Greece	27 September 1962	See Afghanistan–Greece relations: Both countries established diplomatic relations on 27 September 1962.; Afghanistan has an embassy in Athens.; Greece is accredited to Afghanistan from its embassy in Islamabad, Pakistan.
Hungary	18 May 1956	Both countries established diplomatic relations on 18 May 1956.: Afghanistan has an embassy in Budapest.; Hungary has an embassy in Kabul.
Iceland	17 March 2004	Both countries established diplomatic relations on 17 March 2004.: Afghanistan is accredited to Iceland from its embassy in Oslo, Norway.; Iceland is accredited to Afghanistan from its embassy in Oslo, Norway.
Ireland	19 September 2002	Both countries established diplomatic relations on 19 September 2002.
Italy	3 June 1921	See Afghanistan–Italy relations Both countries established diplomatic relations on 3 June 1921. Italian-Afghan relations have generally been positive, and Italy has served as a place of exile for two former Afghan kings, Amanullah Khan (deposed 1929) and Mohammed Zahir Shah (deposed 1973). Italy was among the first nations to recognise Afghanistan's sovereignty, along with Germany, Turkey, France, and Iran, following the 1919 recognition by the Soviet Union. Italy began to take on increased involvement (although on a relatively small scale) in 1935, as Afghanistan established closer relations with Germany, a key Italian ally. Afghanistan maintained these ties throughout much of World War II, though it came under strong pressure from Moscow and London to expel the German and Italian diplomatic corps.: Afghanistan has an embassy in Rome.; Italy has an embassy in Kabul.
Kosovo	17 June 2013	Afghanistan was the first country who officially recognised the independence of the Republic of Kosovo on 18 February 2008. Afghanistan and Kosovo established diplomatic relations on 17 June 2013.
Latvia	18 December 2005	Both countries established diplomatic relations on 18 December 2005.
Liechtenstein	26 October 2018	Both countries established diplomatic relations on 26 October 2018.
Lithuania	31 March 2005	Both countries established diplomatic relations on 31 March 2005.
Luxembourg	13 January 2005	Both countries established diplomatic relations on 13 January 2005.
Malta	8 February 2008	Both countries established diplomatic relations on 8 February 2008.
Moldova	1 December 1994	Both countries established diplomatic relations on 1 December 1994.
Monaco	13 October 2010	Both countries established diplomatic relations on 13 October 2010.
Montenegro	21 September 2010	Both countries established diplomatic relations on 21 September 2010.
Netherlands	2 August 1956	Both countries established diplomatic relations on 2 August 1956 when first Envoy of Afgnanistan Dr. Sardir Najib-Ullah Khan presented his credentials to Queen of the Netherlands.
North Macedonia	17 July 1996	Both countries established diplomatic relations on 17 July 1996.
Norway	31 December 1962	See Afghanistan–Norway relations Both countries established diplomatic relations on 31 December 1962.: Afghanistan has an embassy in Oslo.; Norway has an embassy in Kabul.
Poland	3 November 1927	See Afghanistan–Poland relations Both countries established diplomatic relations on 3 November 1927.: Afghanistan has an embassy in Warsaw.; Poland is accredited to Afghanistan from its embassy in New Delhi, India.
Portugal	14 April 1976	Both countries established diplomatic relations on 14 April 1976.
Romania	5 June 1958	Both countries established diplomatic relations on 5 June 1958.: Afghanistan is accredited to Romania from its embassy in Warsaw, Poland.; Romania is accredited to Afghanistan from its embassy in Islamabad, Pakistan.
Russia	27 May 1919	See Afghanistan–Russia relations Both countries established diplomatic relations on 27 May 1919. Hamid Karzai sitting with Russia's President Dmitry Medvedev Afghanistan and Russia have shared a highly varied relationship from the mid-19th century to the modern day. For decades, Russia and Britain struggled for influence in Afghanistan, strategically positioned between their two empires, in what became known as "The Great Game". Following the 1917 Bolshevik Revolution, the new Soviet Union established more cordial relations with Afghanistan, and in 1919 became the first country to recognise Afghan sovereignty. Relations between the two nations became complicated following the 1978 communist coup known as the Saur Revolution. The new communist Democratic Republic of Afghanistan was highly dependent on the Soviet Union, and the Soviet support for the widely disliked communist regime, and the ensuing Soviet invasion of Afghanistan, led to a great hatred for the Soviets in much of the Afghan population. The Soviets occupied Afghanistan in the face of a bitter ten-year insurgency before withdrawing in 1989. Even following the withdrawal of Soviet forces, the Soviet Union provided massive support to the embattled DRA government, reaching a value of $3 billion a year in 1990. However, this relationship dissolved in 1991 along with the dissolution of the Soviet Union itself. On 13 September 1991, the Soviet government, now dominated by Boris Yeltsin, agreed with the United States on a mutual cut off of military aid to both sides in the Afghan civil war beginning on 1 January 1992. The post-coup Soviet government then attempted to develop political relations with the Afghan resistance. In mid-November it invited a delegation of the resistance's Afghanistan Interim Government (AIG) to Moscow where the Soviets agreed that a transitional government should prepare Afghanistan for national elections. The Soviets did not insist that Najibullah or his colleagues participate in the transitional process. Having been cut adrift both materially and politically, Najibullah's faction torn government began to fall apart, and the city of Kabul fell to the Mujahideen factions in April 1992. In 2009, Russian President Dmitry Medvedev announced that he wanted to be more involved in Afghanistan, supporting development of infrastructure and the army. This came as relations between Afghan President Karzai and American President Obama reached a low.: Afghanistan has an embassy in Moscow.; Russia has an embassy in Kabul and a consulate-general in Mazar-i-Sharif.
Serbia	30 December 1954	Both countries established diplomatic relations on 30 December 1954.: Afghanistan does not have an accreditation to Serbia.; Serbia is accredited to Afghanistan from its embassy in New Delhi, India.
Slovenia	20 September 2004	Both countries established diplomatic relations on 20 September 2004.
Spain	9 May 1950	See Afghanistan–Spain relations Both countries established diplomatic relations on 9 May 1950.: Afghanistan has an embassy in Madrid.; Spain has an embassy in Kabul.
Sweden	22 November 1940	Both countries established diplomatic relations on 22 November 1940.: Afghanistan has an embassy in Stockholm.; Sweden has an embassy in Kabul.
Ukraine	17 April 1995	Both countries established diplomatic relations on 17 April 1995.
United Kingdom	22 November 1921	See Afghanistan–United Kingdom relations Afghanistan established diplomatic relations with the United Kingdom on 22 November 1921. The UK currently recognises the Islamic Republic of Afghanistan government, over the de facto Islamic Emirate of Afghanistan government, as the legal administrator of the country.: Afghanistan maintains an embassy in London.; The United Kingdom was accredited to Afghanistan through its embassy in Kabul. Following the fall of Kabul, the embassy has been co-located with the British Embassy in Doha, Qatar.; The UK governed Afghanistan from 1879–1919, until Afghanistan achieved full independence. Both countries share common membership of the International Criminal Court, and the World Trade Organization. Bilaterally the two countries have a Development Partnership. Further information: The Great Game, First Anglo-Afghan War, Second Anglo-Afghan War, Third Anglo-Afghan War, and Fourth Anglo-Afghan War British interest involves the protection of India, especially from Russia—a contest called The Great Game in the late 19th century. A series of Anglo-Afghan wars between 1839 and 1919 have historically shaped the backdrop for relations between Afghanistan and the United Kingdom. After nearly a century of Anglo-Indian influence in Afghanistan, the state was declared independent in 1919. The United Kingdom did not contribute nor actively oppose the communist led Saur Revolution, it opposed the 1979 Soviet invasion of Afghanistan and had no involvement in the series of civil wars that followed the Soviet withdrawal in 1989.

=== Oceania ===
Country	Formal Relations Began	Notes
Australia	16 December 1968	Both countries established diplomatic relations on 16 December 1968.: Afghanistan has an embassy in Canberra.; In May 2021, Australia closed its embassy in Kabul.; See also: List of Afghan Ambassadors to Australia
Fiji	4 June 2010	Both countries established diplomatic relations on 4 June 2010.
New Zealand	18 September 2003	Both countries established diplomatic relations on 18 September 2003: Afghanistan is accredited to New Zealand from its embassy in Canberra, Australia.; New Zealand is accredited to Afghanistan from its embassy in Tehran, Iran.; See also: List of Afghan Ambassadors to New Zealand

== United Nations ==
During the Soviet occupation in the 1980s, the United Nations was highly critical of the Soviet Union's interference in the internal affairs of Afghanistan and was instrumental in obtaining a negotiated Soviet withdrawal under the terms of the Geneva Accords.

In the aftermath of the Accords and subsequent Soviet withdrawal, the United Nations has assisted in the repatriation of refugees and has provided humanitarian aid, such as health care, educational programs, and food, and has supported mine-clearing operations. The UNDP and associated agencies have undertaken a limited number of development projects. However, the UN reduced its role in Afghanistan in 1992 in the wake of fierce factional strife in and around Kabul. The UN Secretary General has designated a personal representative to head the Office for the Coordination of Humanitarian Assistance to Afghanistan (UNOCHA) and the Special Mission to Afghanistan (UNSMA), both based in Islamabad, Pakistan. Throughout the late 1990s, 2000, and 2001, the UN unsuccessfully strived to promote a peaceful settlement among the Afghan factions as well as provide humanitarian aid, this despite increasing Taliban restrictions upon UN personnel and agencies.

== See also ==
- List of diplomatic missions in Afghanistan
- List of diplomatic missions of Afghanistan
- Visa requirements for Afghan citizens
