= Afghanistan–Italy relations =

- Afghanistan: Italy

Diplomatic mission
- Afghan Embassy, Rome: Italian Embassy, Kabul (closed). Now in Qatar

Afghanistan–Italy relations are the diplomatic relations between Afghanistan and Italy which were formed in 1919. On June 3, 1921, they signed the agreement for the exchange of permanent Diplomatic mission and the centenary, on 2021, was celebrated with letters exchanged between their Chairs. Both nations are members of the United Nations but the new Taliban rulers of Afghanistan are not recognised as a valid government by them, or indeed any state so far.

== History ==
Italy was among the first nations to recognise Afghanistan's sovereignty, along with Germany, Turkey, France, and Iran, following the 1919 recognition by the Soviet Union.

Italian-Afghan relations have generally been positive. When the Afghan king Amanullah Khan was deposed in 1929, he and his family including queen Soraya Tarzi settled in exile in Rome following an invitation by Queen Elena of Italy. Some of their children and descendants including Princess India of Afghanistan grew up in and continue to call Italy home.

Italy began to take on increased involvement (although on a relatively small scale) in 1935, as Afghanistan established closer relations with Germany, a key Italian ally. Relations were hit by the Italian war in Ethiopia, which Afghanistan viewed as a dangerous precedent for Soviet or British expansion in Afghanistan.

Amanullah's long desire to return to the throne in Afghanistan caused friction between Afghanistan and the United Kingdom, who viewed it as a threat to the balance of power in central Asia. The former Afghan sovereign continued getting state subsidies by the Italian king Victor Emmanuel III.

Afghanistan maintained these ties throughout much of World War II, though it came under strong pressure from Moscow and London to expel the German and Italian diplomatic corps.

The only church in Afghanistan, the Chapel in Kabul, was created by the Italian embassy and is maintained by an Italian. This privilege was recognized because Italy was one of the first states to recognize Afghanistan's sovereignty. From 2021 it has been closed as well as the embassy.

King Mohammed Zahir Shah of Afghanistan, deposed in 1973, was also exiled to Italy, living in Rome until his return to Afghanistan 29 years later. He was flown to Kabul on April 18, 2002, in an Italian military plane.

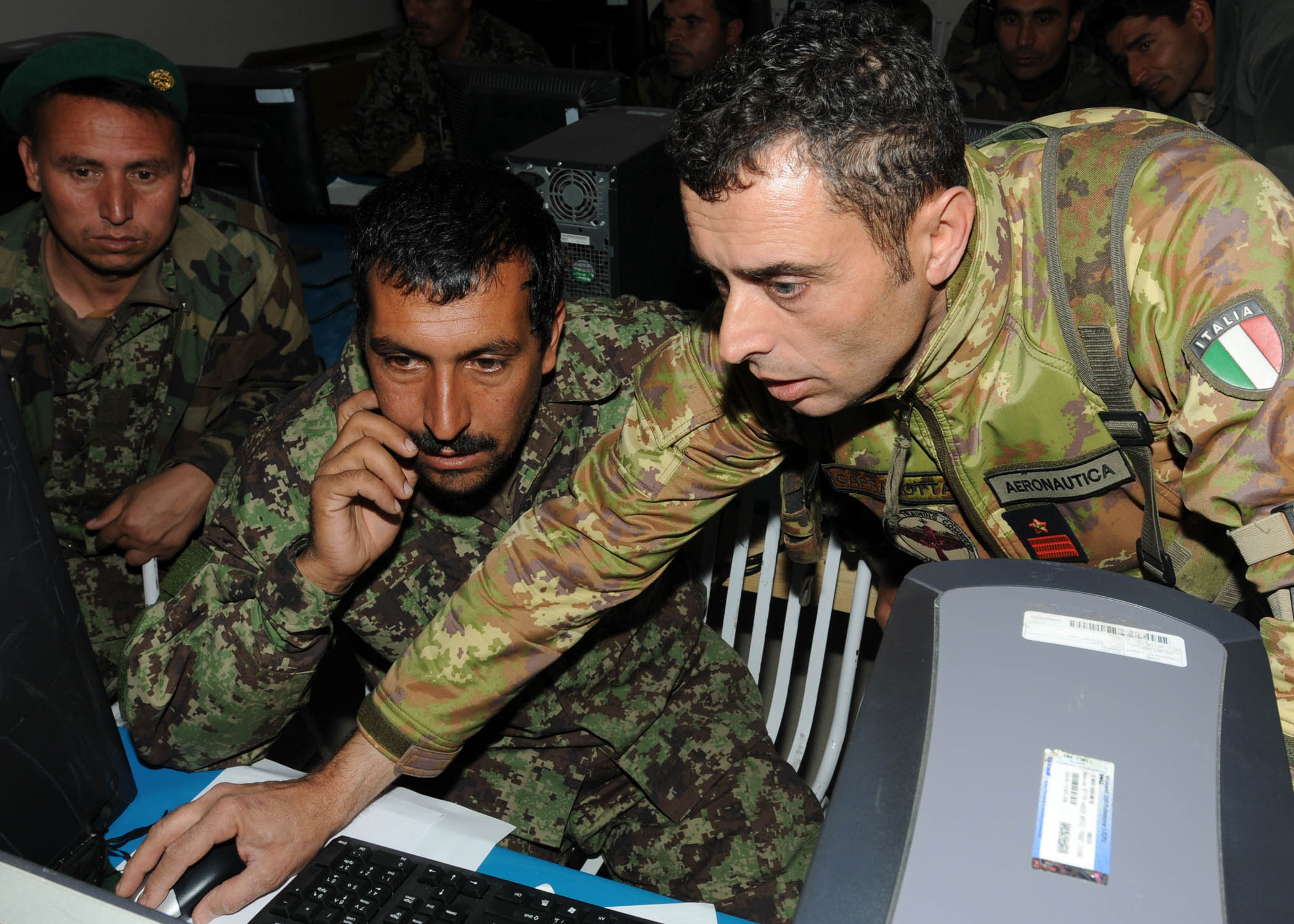
An Italian Air Force member helping Afghan Air Force staff during the ISAF mission, 2011

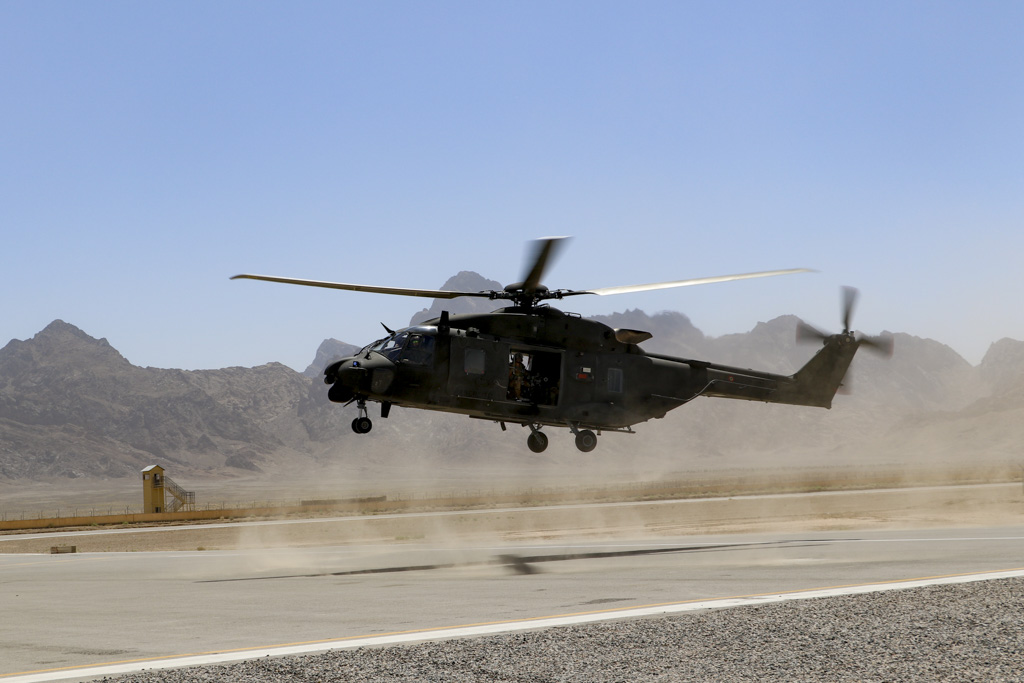
Italian Army helicopter in Farah Base, Afghanistan during the Resolute Support Mission, 2019

Italy was part of the NATO International Security Assistance Force (ISAF) that was active in Afghanistan after December 2001 to create a safe environment for the new government, following the United Nations Resolution 1386 of December 20, 2001. The Italian forces' Area of Responsibility was in the west of Afghanistan including Herat (Train Advise Assist Command – West).

On November 29, 2012, the Italian Parliament ratified an Agreement on partnership and long-term cooperation, previously signed in Rome on January 26, 2012. The agreement had to help Afghanistan achieving stability, as stated in the Bonn Agreement of December 5, 2011. It contained provisions on political cooperation, institutional, security, police, economic and cultural cooperation.

On January 1, 2015, ISAF became Resolute Support, a "no combat" operation aimed at training and assisting the Afghan National Security Forces (ANSF).

The relationship between the two countries was affected by the Doha Agreement (2020) and the following withdrawal of US and allied troops from the country in June 2021. Italian troops remained in Afghanistan until June 30, 2021. As the Taliban re-gained control over Afghanistan, Italy withdrew its military contingent and moved its embassy to Qatar. From 2001 to 2021, 50.000 Italian soldiers were employed in Afghanistan. 53 died in service while 723 others sustained injuries.

On August 13, 2021, a Press Release from the Italian Foreign Ministry stated that, in the light of the Taliban advance in Afghanistan, the Italian Foreign Ministry was maintaining the closest contact with the US State Department. The day before the Press Release was published, Italy's General Secretary, Ettore Sequi, spoke with the US Deputy Secretary of State, Wendy Sherman. They agreed to further strengthen coordination between the embassies of all the allied countries in Kabul, as well as bilaterally, and discussed the initiatives in place and those to be undertaken, taking into consideration the worsening security situation on the ground.

== Embassies ==
Due to political changes and war in Afghanistan, the Italian embassy in Afghanistan was temporarily closed in 1979, 1989, 1993 and again in 2021 with transfer to Qatar.

Since 2020 Vittorio Sandalli has been the Italian ambassador to Islamic Republic of Afghanistan. During the evacuation there was a diplomatic representation only at Kabul International Airport and the embassy was reconstituted at the Ministry of Foreign Affairs in Italy. At the end of 2021 the Italian embassy in Afghanistan moved to Qatar as well as other Western embassies. Since March 2021 Khaled Ahmad Zekriya has been the Islamic Republic of Afghanistan Ambassador to Italy and the embassy is located in Via Nomentana in Rome. This diplomatic representation is not of the Islamic Emirate of Afghanistan because the latter isn't recognized by the Italian government.

== Agreements ==
From 1921 and 2019 Italy and Afghanistan signed 28 Treaties in different domains such as financial assistance, agricultural development etc. On February 16, 2022, the Italian government submitted, for most of them, a verbal note of denouncements and it awaits a confirmation of receiving.

In particular the agreements signed are:

- Agreement for the exchange of permanent diplomatic missions;
- Declaration of understanding relating to civil aviation and exchange of notes;
- Trade, payment and economic and technical cooperation agreement, with exchange of notes;
- Reminder of understanding relating to the granting of a contribution of 36 million Euros to the Afghan budget;
- Agreement to support the Remabar project "rehabilitation of the Maidan Shar Bamyan Road", with attachments;
- Exchange of notes amending the agreement of 20.10.2003 concerning the Remabar project "rehabilitation of the Maidan Shar Bamyan Road", with annex;
- Agreement concerning the "rehabilitation of the Maidan Shar Road - Bamyan Road (second phase)" initiative, with attachments;
- Agreement relating to the Italian contribution to the "national solidarity program";
- Agreement concerning the Italian contribution to a national program to "support to microfinance small Afghan enterprises in the provinces of Herat, Farah and Badghis", with attachments;
- Agreement relating to the initiative "financing the development of national health programs in the provinces of Kabul and Herat", with annex;
- Framework agreement for development cooperation;
- Agreement for the financing of the initiative "support to agriculture and rural development of western provinces", with annexes;
- Cooperation agreement on the prevention and fighting the illicit trafficking in drugs, psychotropic substances and their precursors;
- Financial agreement relating to "financing for the national rural accessibility program", with seven annexes;
- Agreement on partnership and long-term cooperation;
- Financial agreement relating to "funding for the national rural accessibility program. year 2012", with six attachments;
- Agreement concerning the Italian contribution to the "national solidarity program - III", with two attachments;
- Addendum n.1 to the financial agreement of 24.07.2011 (funding for the national rural accessibility program);
- Addendum n.1 to the financial agreement of 14.10.2012 (funding for the national rural accessibility program. year 2012);
- Credit agreement for a convenient credit granted for the adaptation of the civil aviation sector of Herat International Airport to international standards;
- Agreement concerning the "non-formal approach to training, education and jobs in Afghanistan" (nateja) project of the nsdc program (national skills development program), with three attachments;
- Agreement concerning the Italian contribution to the "national solidarity program - III", with two attachments;
- Credit agreement on the granting of a facilitated loan for the "rehabilitation of the east-west corridor from Herat to Chist-e-Sharif", with three attachments;
- Agreement for the implementation of the project "support to agriculture and rural markets for high value chains in Herat and Bamyan (Sarm)", with three annexes;
- Agreement for the implementation of the "wash for an inclusive and sustainable development of the population of the provinces of Herat, Farah, Ghor and Bamyan", with three annexes;
- Agreement for the implementation of the project "strengthening the statistical system in Afghanistan", with three annexes;
- Agreement for the implementation of the program called "contribution to the construction of the Khaf-Herat railway section, segment 4 - phase II";
- Agreement for the implementation of the project "sustainable management of the territory and water resources for the improvement of high value agricultural production and marketing in the provinces of Herat and Bamyan (Sarm)", with three annexes.

== Economic relations ==
Trade between Italy and Afghanistan increased between 2014 and 2020 when the situation changed. In 2020 the value of Italian exports to Afghanistan was 20.555 million euros and in 2021 it dropped to 9.882 million. The trend for imports reversed. In 2020 the value was 6.030 million and in 2021 it was 49.870 million euros. The principal products imported by Italy were textile products and permanent crops. The major commodities exported were cleaning products and soap.

== Resident diplomatic missions ==
- Afghanistan has an embassy in Rome.
- Italy closed its embassy in Kabul in 2021.

== See also ==
- Foreign relations of Afghanistan
- Foreign relations of Italy
