= Afghanistan–Israel relations =

Bilateral relations between Afghanistan and Israel

- Israel: Afghanistan

Afghanistan–Israel relations refer to the bilateral ties between Afghanistan and the State of Israel. The two countries do not have formal diplomatic relations, and Afghanistan did not recognize Jerusalem as its capital after it declared independence in 1948.

Afghanistan had a long lasting Jewish community for 2500 years before Zablon Simintov, who lived in Kabul and served as caretaker of Afghanistan's only remaining synagogue, was thought to be the last Jew living in Afghanistan had left the country following the 2021 Taliban offensive alongside his relative, Tova Moradi, was declared the last Jew after Simintov was evacuated to Israel with the aid of Israeli businessman Mordechai Kahana on 7 September 2021. Moradi also made aliyah to Israel on 29 October 2021. Simintov's desire to leave Afghanistan stemmed from his concerns of being kidnapped or killed by radical Islamist terrorist groups such as the Islamic State – KP rather than the Taliban.

== History ==
In the 1980s, Israel cooperated with the United States, Pakistan, Saudi Arabia, and other countries as part of Operation Cyclone, where it indirectly provided armaments to the Afghan mujahideen, who were fighting the Soviet-backed Afghan government as well as the Soviet Union itself. Thousands of mujahideen fighters, particularly from the Hezb-e Islami militia of Gulbuddin Hekmatyar, were reportedly trained by Israeli military instructors. Akhtar Abdur Rahman, the then-head of Pakistan's Inter-Services Intelligence, allegedly allowed Israeli personnel into Pakistan during this time.

Historically, Afghan royals have proclaimed an origin story that claims that their ancestor is the prominent Hebrew patriarch, Jacob. There are also origin theories among some Pashtun tribes that claim their descent from Saul, the first monarch of the United Kingdom of Israel.

In a 2005 interview in Kabul with a reporter from the Israeli newspaper Yedioth Ahronoth, former Afghan president Hamid Karzai hinted at a desire to establish formal ties with Israel, stating: "when there is further progress [in the Middle East peace process], and the Palestinians begin to get a state of their own, Afghanistan will be glad to have full relations with Israel." He also revealed that he had met Israeli politician Shimon Peres several times, and called him a "dear man, a real warrior for peace."

With regards to international relations after the Taliban seizure of Afghanistan in 2021, Taliban spokesperson Suhail Shaheen told the Russian news agency Sputnik: "Of course, we won't have any relations with Israel. We want to have relations with other countries; Israel is not among these countries. We would like to have relations with all the regional countries and neighbouring countries as well as Asian countries." In 2022, around 200 Taliban officials were open to have ties with Israel in order to ''empower and sustain their regime. Therefore they need to form strong relations with superpowers in the region, and they see Israel as a strong influencer."

== See also ==
- Foreign relations of Afghanistan
- Foreign relations of Israel
- History of the Jews in Afghanistan
