= Afghanistan–Norway relations =

- Afghanistan: Norway

Diplomatic mission
- Afghan Embassy, Oslo: Embassy of Norway, Kabul (closed)

Envoy
- First Secretary Najibullah Sherkhan: none

Afghanistan–Norway relations are bilateral diplomatic relations between Afghanistan and Norway. Afghanistan has an embassy in Oslo that has been operated by the Taliban since 2025. Norway has an embassy in Kabul, although it has been closed since the August 2021 Taliban takeover of Kabul.

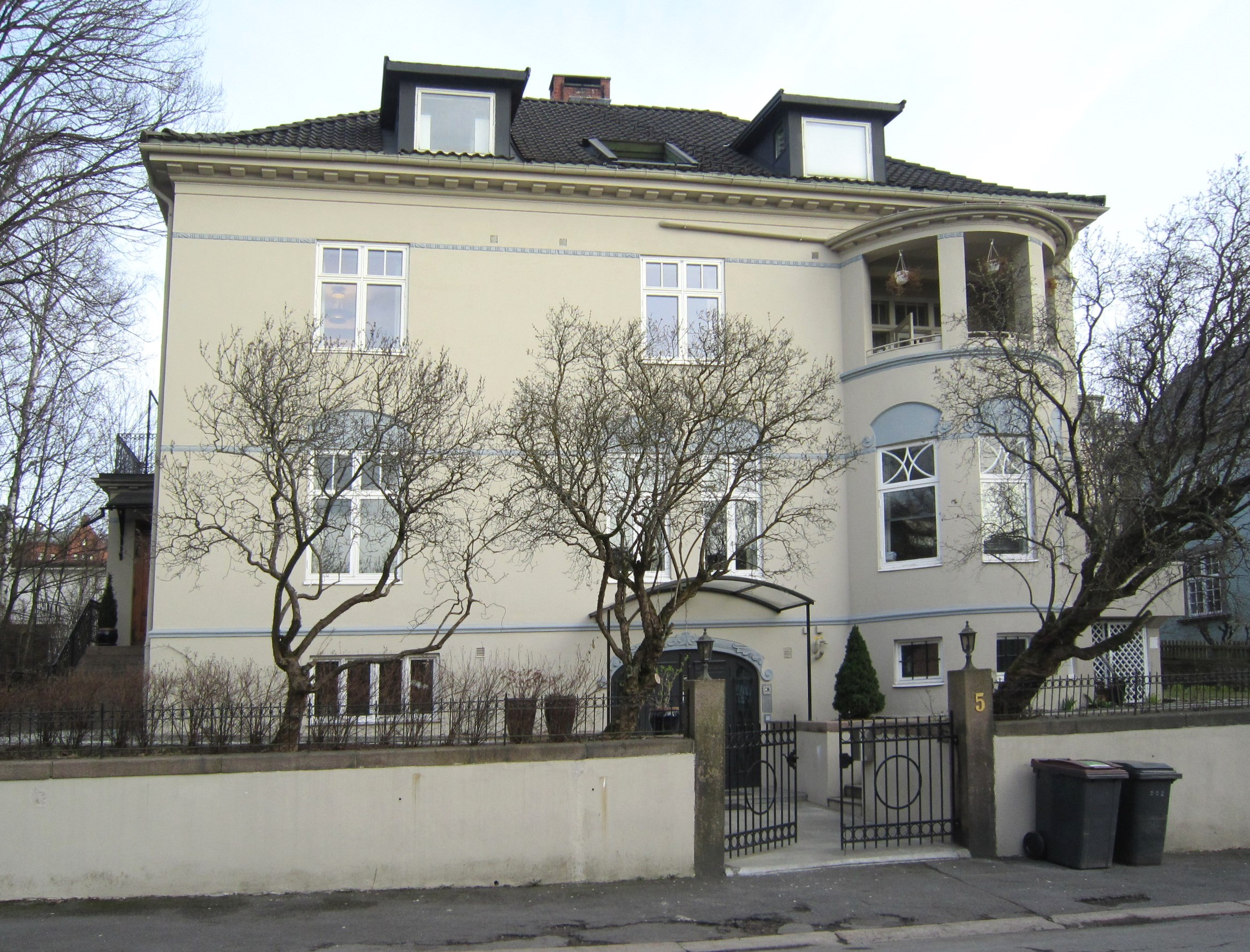
The Afghan embassy in Oslo, Norway

== History ==
Afghanistan and Norway have had diplomatic relations since 1931. The two countries have a long history of cooperation, and Norway has been a strong supporter of Afghanistan's development.

In the 1960s, Norway provided assistance to Afghanistan in the areas of education, health, and agriculture. Norway also helped to build the Salang Tunnel, which is a major transportation link between northern and southern Afghanistan.

In the 1980s, Norway provided humanitarian assistance to Afghanistan during the Soviet occupation. Norway also supported the Afghan resistance movement, the mujaheddin.

After the fall of the Taliban in 2001, Norway became a major donor to Afghanistan. Norway provided assistance in the areas of security, governance, and development. Norway also helped to rebuild the Afghan National Army and the Afghan National Police.

As of 2010, there are 10,475 Afghan people living in Norway. The Ministry of Foreign Affairs discourage people to travel to Afghanistan. Norway participated in the International Security Assistance Force and in the Resolute Support Mission in the War in Afghanistan.

The Taliban takeover of Afghanistan in August 2021 has had a significant impact on relations between the two countries. Norway has been critical of the Taliban's human rights record, and has suspended its development assistance to Afghanistan. However, Norway has also maintained a dialogue with the Taliban, and has hosted a number of meetings between the Taliban and Afghan civil society groups.

In December 2021, Norway announced that it would provide 10 million Norwegian krone (about US$1.16 million) in humanitarian aid to Afghanistan. This aid is intended to help the most vulnerable Afghans, including women and children.

Norway has also been involved in efforts to evacuate Afghans who are at risk of persecution by the Taliban. In August 2021, Norway evacuated about 1,000 Afghans, including human rights defenders, journalists, and women's rights activists.

In January 2022, Norwegian Prime Minister Jonas Gahr Stoere defended the country's decision to host talks between Taliban members, representatives of Afghan civil society, and foreign diplomats. Stoere stated that the talks were conducted to make "it possible to hold those who hold power in Afghanistan accountable".

In January 2023, Norway hosted a meeting of the Contact Group for Afghanistan, which brings together representatives from countries that have a stake in Afghanistan's future. The meeting was an opportunity for countries to discuss their shared concerns about the situation in Afghanistan and to coordinate their response.

In September 2024, the government of Norway forced the Afghan embassy in Oslo to close. In January 2025, the Norwegian government accepted a Taliban diplomat, First Secretary of the Embassy Najibullah Sherkhan, and the embassy resumed operations in March.

== See also ==
- Foreign relations of Afghanistan
- Foreign relations of Norway
