= Afghanistan–Kazakhstan relations =

- Afghanistan: Kazakhstan

Relations between Afghanistan and Kazakhstan began in 1992.

== History ==
Kazakhs faced persecution at the hands of the Stalinist regime in the 1930s, and many of those who fled the USSR emigrated to Afghanistan. Thousands of Kazakhs continued to reside in Afghanistan until that country's warfare period began in the 1970s.

Official bilateral relations began on February 12, 1992. Afghanistan opened an embassy in Almaty in 1993, while Kazakhstan opened one in Kabul in 2003.

During the civil war in Afghanistan, Kazakhstan hosted an emergency meeting with its Central Asian neighbors and Russia in 1996. The talks became the basis for a UN resolution.

In May 2011, Kazakhstan voted to send troops to Afghanistan as part of NATO's ISAF mission (although Kazakhstan is not part of NATO). It became the first ex-Soviet Central Asian state to join ISAF.

Trade turnover between the two countries amounted to $336.7 million in 2014.

As of 2017, Kazakhstan has provided $20 billion in humanitarian assistance to Afghanistan.

In August 2021, after the Taliban insurgents took Kabul and drove away the government, the Kazakh foreign ministry said that it does not recognize the Taliban regime as the legal Afghan government. Kazakh president Kassym-Jomart Tokayev said his country will bolster its defenses from any potential spillover threats from Afghanistan. The UN mission to Afghanistan moved its base to Kazakhstan in September.

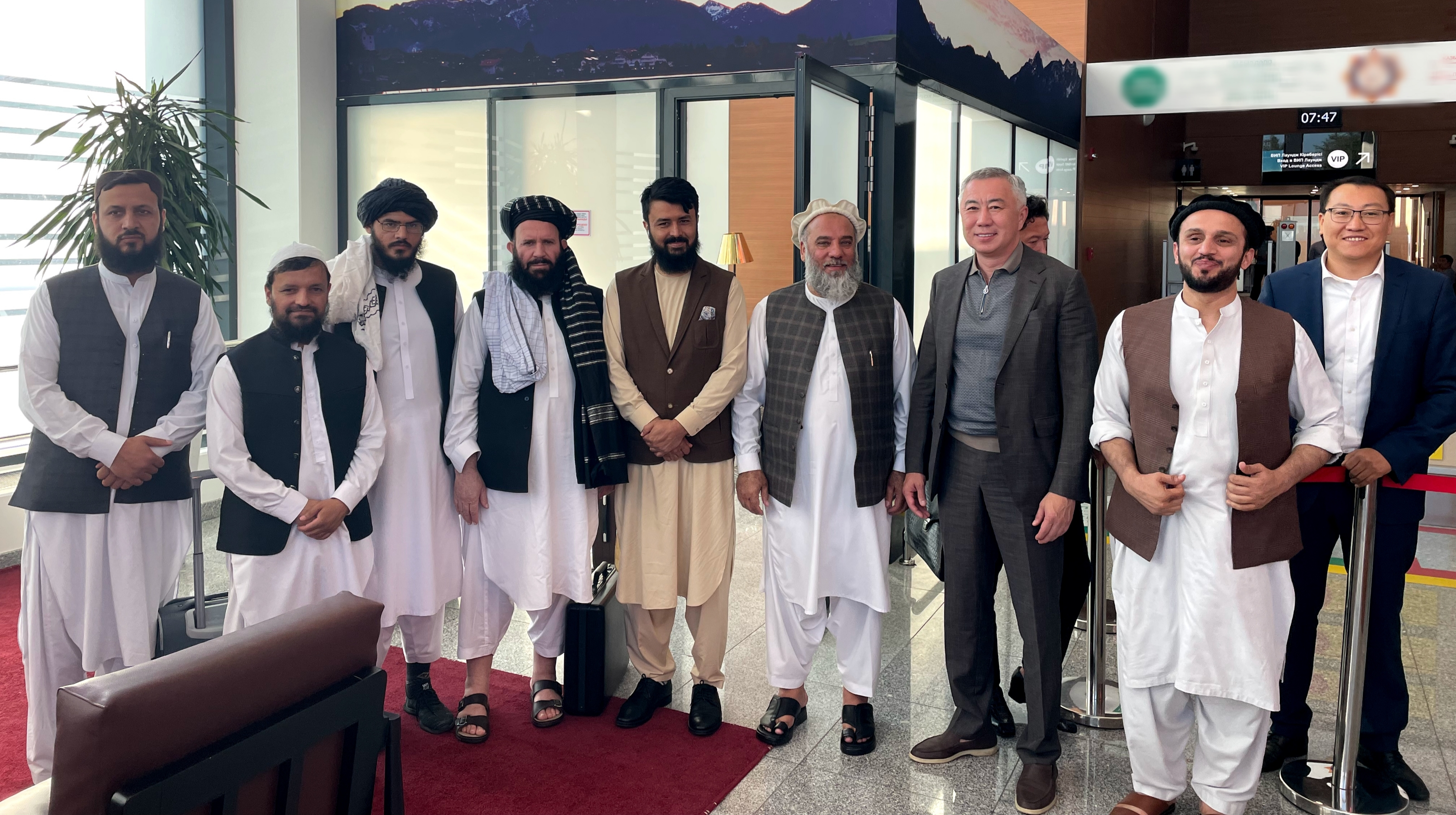
Astana held a Kazakh-Afghan business-forum on 3 August 2023, which, despite not formally recognizing Taliban's government, had The Minister of Commerce and Industry of Afghanistan Nooruddin Azizi as one of its guests.

Despite not formally recognizing its government and listing the Taliban as a terrorist organization, an Afghan–Kazakh business-forum was held in Astana on 3 August 2023. The forum included 200 Afghan delegates and concluded with signing of contracts worth almost $200 million. The forum included Nooruddin Azizi as one of its guests and was criticized by an unregistered oppositional party Alğa Qazaqstan. The official representative of the Ministry of Foreign Affairs of Kazakhstan, Aibek Smadiarov, revealed on the 29 December of the same year that the Taliban was removed from the list of organizations prohibited in Kazakhstan. The reasoning, as stated in his interview to Kazinform, was that the decision was done according to a United Nations resolution, which indeed does not recognize Taliban as terrorist.

== Humanitarian relations ==
At the international conference Water Security and Transboundary Water Use: Challenges and Solutions held in Astana on 16 May 2025, Kazakh officials raised concerns over the canal's long-term implications for regional water stability. The canal, set to divert up to 10 cubic kilometers of water annually from the Amu Darya to irrigate Afghan farmland, could reduce water flow into the Syr Darya and further deplete the Aral Sea, indirectly affecting Kazakhstan despite the lack of a shared border. Kazakhstan's Deputy Water Minister, Aslan Abdraimov, and Baytak Party chairman Azamatkhan Amirtayev warned that increased withdrawals from the Amu Darya might force upstream countries like Uzbekistan to rely more heavily on the Syr Darya, reducing Kazakhstan's water supply by as much as 40%.

== See also ==
- Foreign relations of Afghanistan
- Foreign relations of Kazakhstan
