= Afghanistan–France relations =

- Afghanistan: France

Diplomatic mission
- Afghan Embassy, Paris: French Embassy, Kabul (closed)

Afghanistan–France relations are the diplomatic relations between Afghanistan and France. While Afghanistan has an embassy in Paris, France closed its embassy in Kabul in 2021. Both nations are members of the United Nations.

== History ==
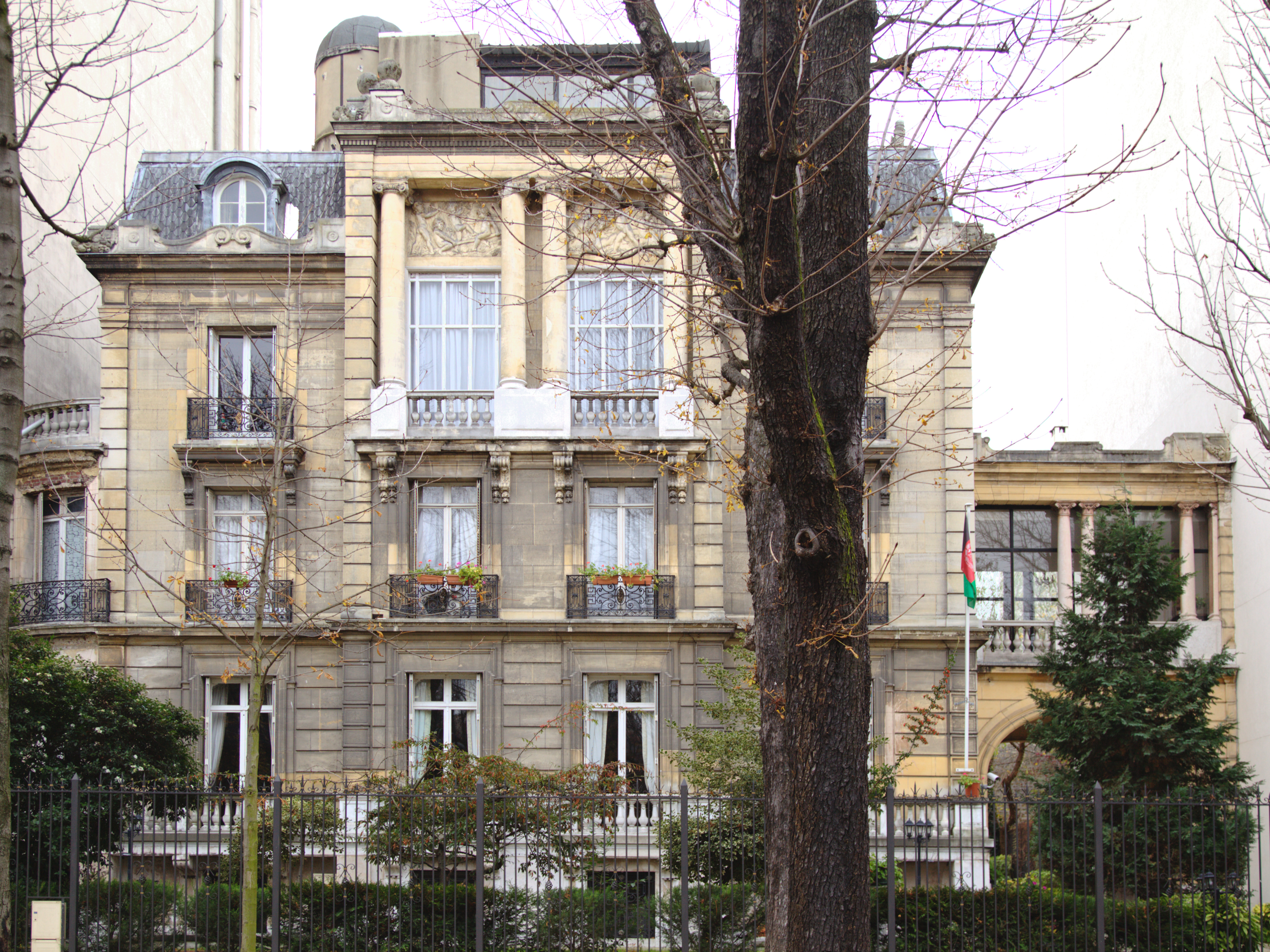
Embassy of Afghanistan in Paris

Afghanistan and France established diplomatic relations in 1922. In 1923, France opened a diplomatic legation in Kabul as well as an office for the French Archaeological Delegation in Afghanistan (DAFA). Initially, relations between both nations were underdeveloped. In 1928, Afghan King Amanullah Khan paid an official visit to France.

In January 1943, during World War II, France closed its diplomatic legation in Kabul. As a result, Afghanistan closed its diplomatic legation in Paris in 1944 when Vichy France declined Afghanistan's diplomatic legation dual accreditation to France and Switzerland. Soon after the war, both nations re-opened their legations and upgraded them to embassies in 1949.

In 1965, Afghan King Mohammed Zahir Shah paid an official visit to France and met with President Charles de Gaulle. In 1968, French Prime Minister Georges Pompidou paid an official visit to Afghanistan.

In 1979, the Soviet Union invaded Afghanistan, starting the Soviet–Afghan War. For the next 25 years, relations between both nations became nearly nonexistent. After the Soviets withdrew from Afghanistan, the French government announced in January 1990 that it would reopen its embassy in Kabul. Years later the civil war in Afghanistan and Taliban stopped relations once again.

Since the NATO led War in Afghanistan, France has participated in multiple military excursions and battles throughout the country. In 2002, France re-established diplomatic relations with the Afghan government under President Hamid Karzai. Under the International Security Assistance Force, France has played a leading role of providing security in the northeastern part of Afghanistan, especially in the Kapisa Province.

In August 2021, France closed its embassy in Kabul due to the return of the Taliban to power, which has not been recognized by any state in the world. Afghanistan has an embassy in Paris.

== High-level visits ==
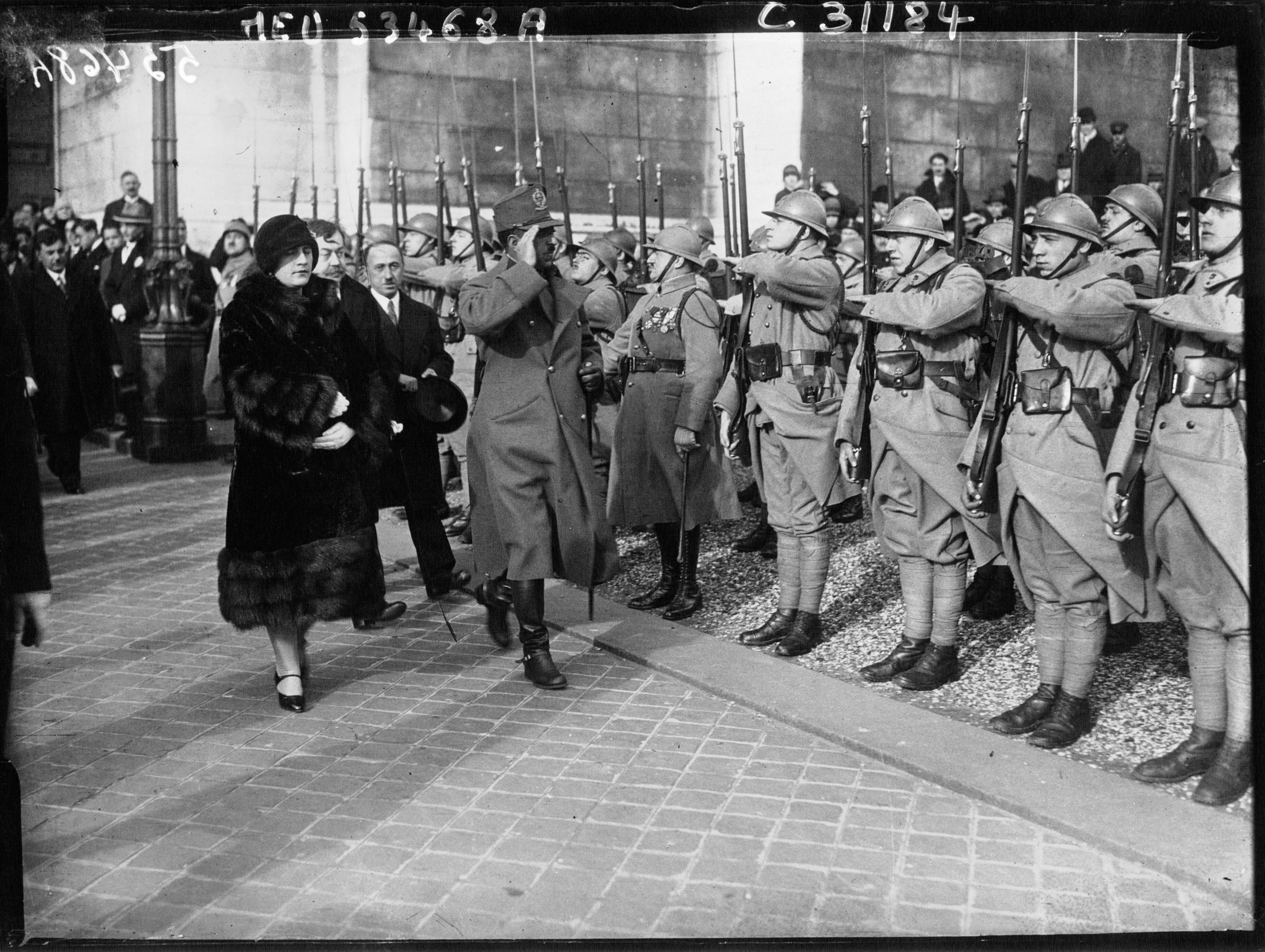
Amanullah Khan in Paris, 1928.

Presidential visits from Afghanistan to France

- King Amanullah Khan (1928)
- King Mohammed Zahir Shah (1950, 1965)
- President Hamid Karzai (2002, 2005, 2008, 2012)

Presidential visits from France to Afghanistan

- Prime Minister Georges Pompidou (1968)
- President Nicolas Sarkozy (2011)
- President François Hollande (2012)

== Bilateral relations ==
Throughout the years, both nations have signed numerous bilateral agreements such as an Agreement of Cooperation between the University of Paris and Kabul University (1960); Agreement on Health Cooperation (1963); Cultural and Technical Cooperation (1966); Agreement on Agriculture Cooperation (1969) and a Treaty of Friendship and Cooperation (2012).

== Trade ==
In 2015, trade between Afghanistan and France totaled €27.8 million Euros. France's three main exports to Afghanistan are agricultural products, pharmaceuticals, rubber and plastic products.

== Resident diplomatic missions ==
- Afghanistan has an embassy in Paris.
- France closed its embassy in Kabul in 2021.

== See also ==
- Foreign relations of Afghanistan
- Foreign relations of France
- Calais Jungle
