= Afghanistan–Colombia relations =

- Afghanistan: Colombia

Bilateral relations between Afghanistan and Colombia were established in 1990. Both countries are members of the World Trade Organization and the United Nations.

== History ==
On August 3, 1990, Afghanistan and Colombia established bilateral relations. In June 2018, a meeting was held to enhance ties between the two nations. Colombian vice minister Patti Londoño accepted the visit from the ambassador of Afghanistan in Washington, non-resident for Colombia, Argentina, Mexico and the Dominican Republic, Hamdullah Mohib. In 2021, Colombia received 4,000 Afghan refugees as a result of the Taliban offensive, providing them with medical care. They were housed in hotels in Bogotá, Barranquilla, and Cali. In addition, the refugees were granted identification which gave them free movement. However, they did not have the right to work or study in the country. Former president Iván Duque announced that Colombia would temporarily host the refugees until they were able to enter the United States.

== Trade ==
In 2022, Afghanistan exported $614k to Colombia. The products exported from Afghanistan to Colombia were soapstone ($450k), calculators ($122k), trailers and semi-trailers, without mechanically propelled vehicles ($42.4k). Colombia exported $4.43k to Afghanistan, but did not export any products.

== Resident diplomatic missions ==
- Afghanistan was accredited to Colombia from its embassy in Washington, D.C., United States before its closure.
- Colombia is accredited to Afghanistan from its embassy in New Delhi, India.

== See also ==
- Foreign relations of Afghanistan
- Foreign relations of Colombia
