= Afghanistan–Mongolia relations =

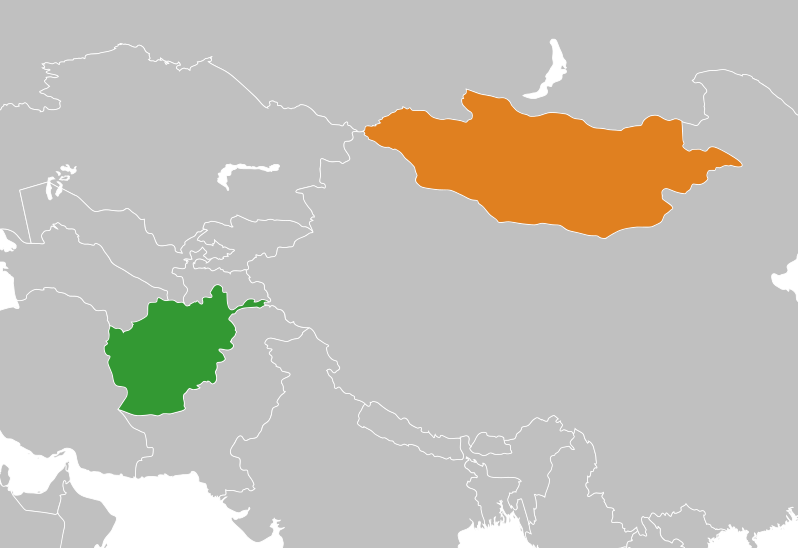

- Afghanistan: Mongolia

Afghanistan–Mongolia relations are the diplomatic relations between Afghanistan and Mongolia, two landlocked Asian countries. Afghanistan has a non-resident ambassador in Beijing.

== History ==
The Mongol Empire ruled present-day Afghanistan between 1219 and 1332. The western and southern part of Afghanistan was in the Ilkhanate, while the eastern part including Kabul lay in the Chagatai Khanate.

Afghanistan and Mongolia were two of three countries (the other being North Korea) that shared borders with both the Soviet Union and People's Republic of China. Official relations were established on February 1, 1962 with the Mongolian leader Yumjaagiin Tsedenbal visiting Kabul.

Both countries were in the Soviet sphere of influence during the Sino-Soviet split. In 1978, a Mongolian embassy was established in Kabul while in 1980 an Afghan embassy opened in Ulaanbaatar with Assadullah Sarwari becoming the ambassador. President Babrak Karmal of Afghanistan visited Mongolia in 1982. However the embassy in Ulaanbaatar closed by 1988.

Mongolian soldiers came to Afghanistan as peacekeepers in NATO's International Security Assistance Force (ISAF) mission in 2001. About 4,500 Mongolian Armed Forces personnel were in Afghanistan between 2009 and 2014.

Diplomatic relations were strengthened in 2015 and 2018, including in intellectual and scholarly terms.

== See also ==
- Foreign relations of Afghanistan
- Foreign relations of Mongolia
