= Afghanistan–Spain relations =

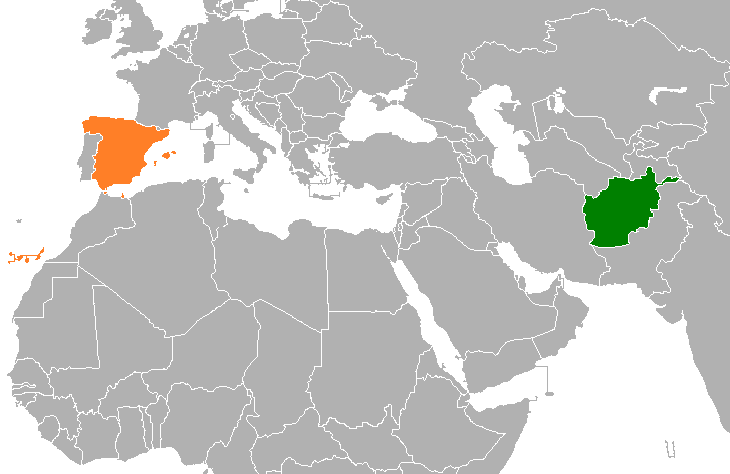
- Afghanistan: Spain

Diplomatic mission
- Afghan Embassy, Madrid: Spanish Embassy, Kabul (closed)

Afghanistan has an embassy in Madrid. In August 2021, Spain closed its embassy in Kabul after the Taliban takeover of the city.

== Military operations ==
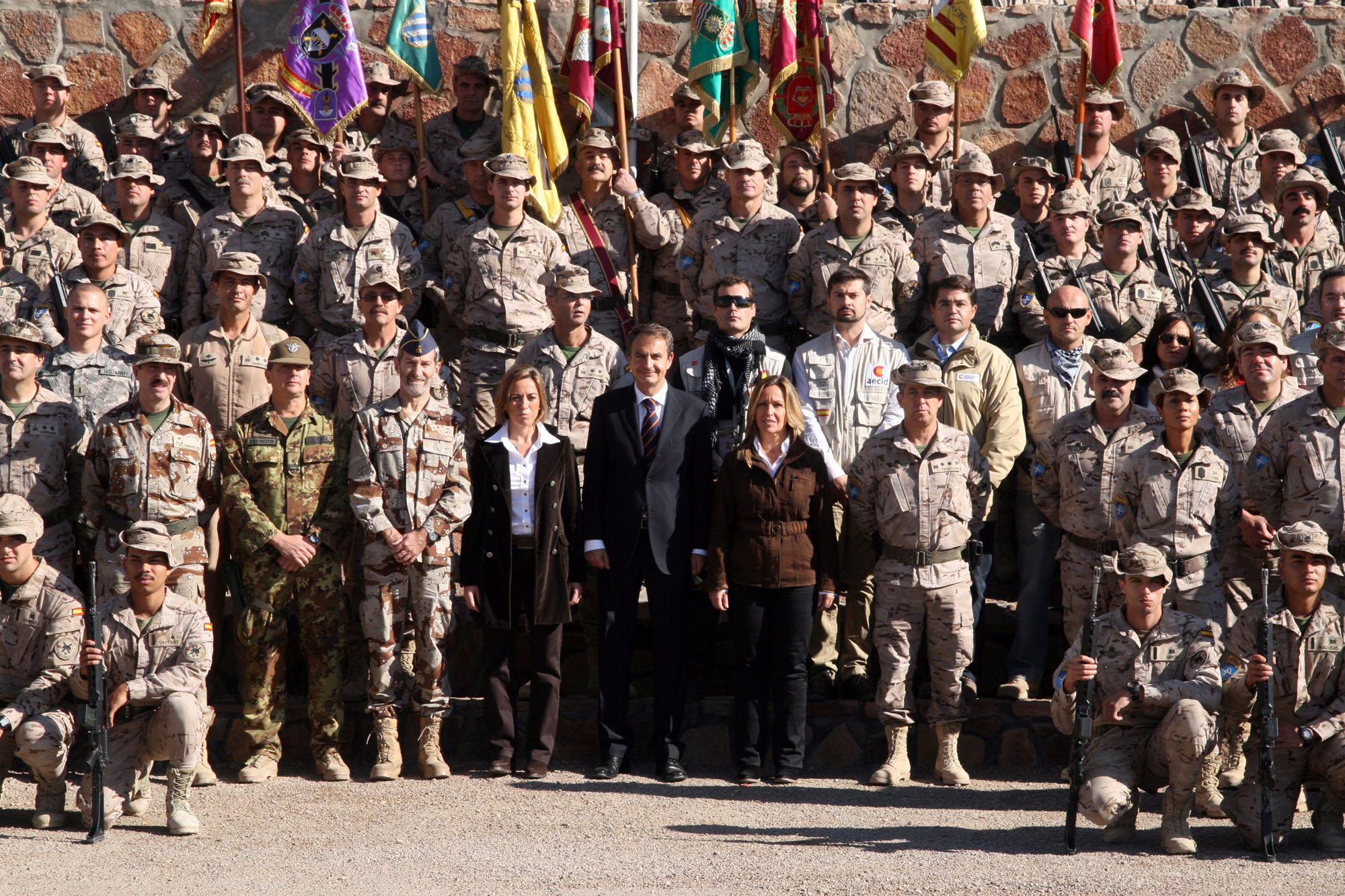
Visit of the president of the Spanish government Rodríguez Zapatero with soldiers of the Spanish Army in 2010.

The Spanish military operations in Afghanistan were developed with the objective of clearing the insurgency in the provinces of Herat and Badghis (Together many times with Italian forces) in Afghanistan and leave the province ready for Afghans to take care of it after the withdrawal of Spanish troops in 2014 in addition to rebuild those provinces which were in charge.

== Resident diplomatic missions ==
- Afghanistan has an embassy in Madrid.
- Spain closed its embassy in Kabul in 2021.

== See also ==
- Foreign relations of Afghanistan
- Foreign relations of Spain
