= Afghanistan–Nepal relations =

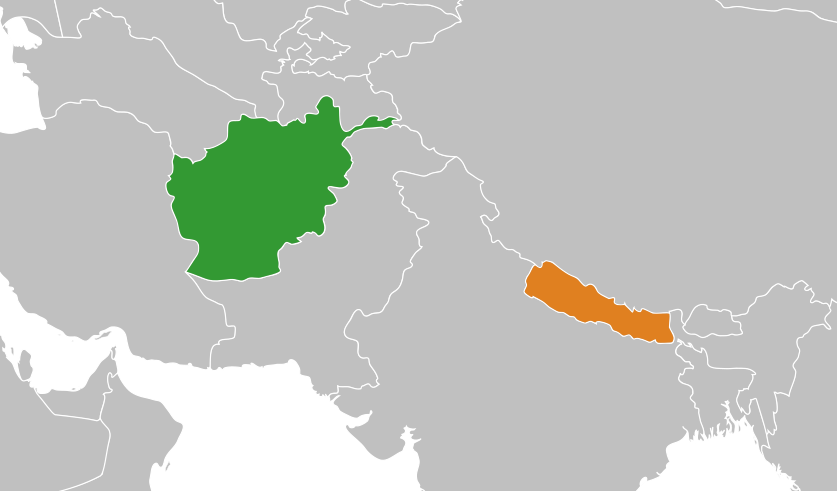

- Afghanistan: Nepal

Afghanistan–Nepal relations refer to the diplomatic relations between Afghanistan and Nepal. Nepal has relations with the Islamic Republic of Afghanistan through its Embassy in New Delhi. The two countries have had long bilateral relations and both are members of the South Asian Association for Regional Cooperation (SAARC).

== History ==
Afghan-Nepali relations date back to the time of the First Anglo-Afghan War. Thousands of Nepali troops of the early Gurkha units joined the British "Army of the Indus" in the 1839 invasion. It is not known how many of these Gurkhas were killed in the war. Hundreds of these fighters were also at Charikar fort under siege, of which only one managed to survive a dangerous journey to the British cantonment in the Punjab.

Nepali Gurkhas were also assigned by the British at the Afghan-Indian border where they had frequent skirmishes with local Afghan Pashtuns. Nepali soldiers were also sent by prime minister Chandra Shumsher Jang Bahadur Rana for the Waziristan campaign (1919–1920) at the border.

Official diplomatic relations began on July 1, 1961.

Gurkha fighters of the United Kingdom fought as part of NATO's International Security Assistance Force (ISAF) mission in Afghanistan from 2001 to 2014. Prince Harry also served as part of this force in Afghanistan in 2007.

Afghan president Ashraf Ghani visited Nepal in 2014 to meet the Nepali president Ram Baran Yadav. They discussed ways to deepen bilateral relations, particularly within the framework of the SAARC.

During the War in Afghanistan (2001–2021), Nepali Gurkha security guards hired by private contractors played a crucial role in protecting diplomatic places and officials in Afghanistan. As many as 15,000 were in the country, attracted by the good wages, despite the volatile situation in Afghanistan.

In 2016, 14 Nepali contractors protecting the Canadian Embassy in Kabul were killed in a suicide attack.

After the Fall of Kabul (2021), the Nepali government attempted to evacuate all its nationals from Afghanistan. Kathmandu does not have an embassy in Kabul, with the Indian embassy being accredited instead.
