= Permanent crop =

Permanent crop means that the land continues to produce year after year, without the farmer needing to replant fields after each harvest.

Traditionally, "arable land" included any land suitable for the growing of crops, even if it was actually being used for the production of permanent crops such as grapes or peaches. Modern agriculture—particularly organizations such as the CIA and FAO—prefer the term of art permanent cropland to describe such cultivable land that is not being used for annually-harvested crops such as staple grains. In such usage, permanent cropland is a form of agricultural land that includes grasslands and shrublands used to grow grape vines or coffee; orchards used to grow fruit or olives; and forested plantations used to grow nuts or rubber. It does not include, however, tree farms intended to be used for wood or timber.

Areas planted with permanent crops, including oil palm, coffee, tea and other tree crops, mostly cultivated for global markets, increased by 42% or 56 Mha between 2001 and 2023 in nearly all regions and subregions of the world.

== See also ==
- Agricultural land
- Arable land
- Perennial crop
- Permaculture

== Sources ==
This article incorporates text from a free content work. Licensed under CC BY 4.0 (license statement/permission). Text taken from The State of the World’s Land and Water Resources for Food and Agriculture 2025, Food and Agriculture Organization of the United Nations (FAO).
