= Afghanistan–Vietnam relations =

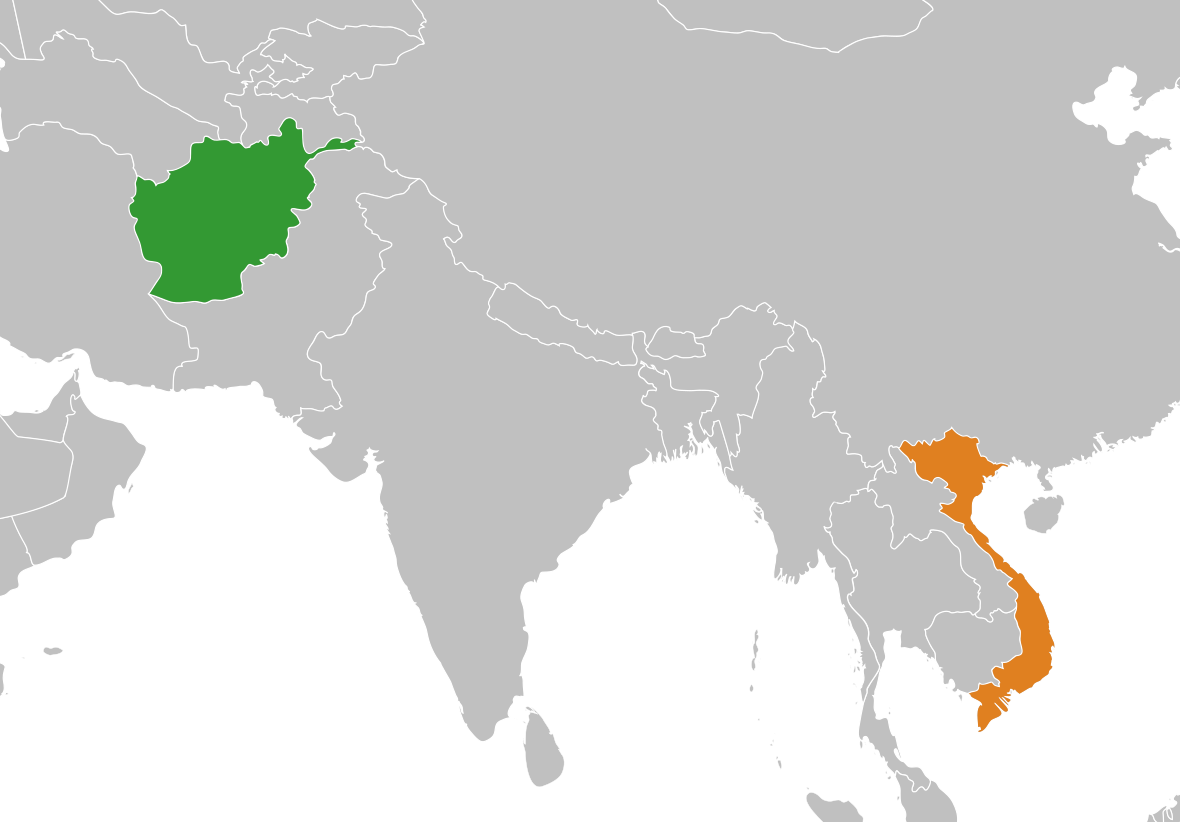

- Afghanistan: Vietnam

Afghanistan–Vietnam relations (Vietnamese: Quan hệ Việt Nam – Afghanistan) refers to the diplomatic relations between Afghanistan and Vietnam.

== History ==
There are currently no diplomatic relations between the two Asian countries but previously there were. Relations were formed on September 16, 1974, during the era of Daoud Khan's Republic of Afghanistan and the Vietnam War-era Socialist Republic of Vietnam.

A Vietnamese embassy was opened in Kabul in 1978 under the Afghan regime following the Saur Revolution. Both the Vietnamese and Afghan republics were communist states and allies of the Soviet Union.

In a January 1980 United Nations debate, Vietnam was one of only four countries to support the Soviet intervention into Afghanistan.

The two countries signed a diplomatic visa exemption agreement in 1987.

After 1992 when the socialist government in Afghanistan collapsed, Vietnam closed its embassy in that country. The Afghanistan's embassy in Vietnam closed in June 1993. The embassy in Kabul was accredited to the Vietnamese embassy in Pakistan, while the embassy in Hanoi was accredited to the Afghan embassy in China.

Vietnam recognized the Afghan government of Hamid Karzai in December 2001 and thereafter provided humanitarian assistance in the form of goods.

In January 2018, Janan Mosazai became the Afghan Ambassador Extraordinary and Plenipotentiary to Vietnam and met Vietnamese Deputy Minister Đặng Đình Quý.

In 2020, the Afghan ambassador to Sri Lanka Ashraf Haidari met his Vietnamese counterpart Pham Ngoc. Haidari commented that:

We are quite inspired by Vietnam’s fast rise and notable progress in all sectors of sustainable development, following the country’s war years. That is why we look forward to learning relevant lessons from Vietnam for application in the post-conflict and post-peace Afghanistan.

== See also ==
- Afghanistan–China relations
- Sino-Soviet split
