= Afghanistan–South Korea relations =

- Afghanistan: South Korea

Diplomatic mission
- Afghan Embassy, Seoul: None

Envoy
- Ambassador Abdul Hakim Atarud: None

Bilateral relations between South Korea and Afghanistan began in 1973 and have effectively been non-existent since the Taliban gained control of Kabul and much of the rest of Afghanistan in August 2021.

On September 17, 1978, Afghanistan's pro-Soviet Khalq government announced that it would break off relations and instead recognize only the Democratic People's Republic of Korea (North Korea). A North Korean delegation visited Afghanistan in October 1978.

South Korea was engaged in Afghanistan recovery from its years of civil war in the 2000s and 2010s. South Korea established an embassy in Kabul in 2002, while Afghanistan established its embassy in Seoul in 2004.

In 2007, the Taliban took 23 South Korean missionaries hostage. The Taliban killed two of the abducted missionaries on 25 and 30 July and released the remaining 21 on the 29 and 30 of August, when the South Korean government promised to withdraw 200 troops from Afghanistan by the end of 2007.

The Republic of Korea cut virtually all of its ties with Afghanistan following the Taliban takeover, including shuttering its embassy after almost 20 years. The Taliban government has, however, maintained its embassy in Seoul. However, the Islamic Republic of Afghanistan's embassy in Seoul continues to operate, headed by Ambassador Abdul Hakim Atarud, who was appointed by President Ghani.
