= Afghanistan–Indonesia relations =

- Afghanistan: Indonesia

Diplomatic mission
- Afghan Embassy, Jakarta: Indonesian Embassy, Kabul

Envoy
- Chargé d'Affaires Sadullah Baloch

Afghanistan and Indonesia established diplomatic relations on 20 May 1950. The relationship is mostly founded on common religious solidarity, as Indonesia is the world's most populous Muslim majority country, and Afghanistan is also a Muslim-majority country. Indonesia has expressed its commitment to support and assist the rebuilding of Post-Taliban Afghanistan in various sectors, including technical training, infrastructure, women's empowerment, higher education, and diplomat training. Indonesia has an embassy in Kabul, while Afghanistan has an embassy in Jakarta operated by the Taliban. Both nations are full members of Non-Aligned Movement and Organisation of Islamic Cooperation.

== History ==
Afghanistan was among the early countries that recognized the Republic of Indonesia after the revolution ended in 1949. Afghanistan and Indonesia officially established diplomatic relations on May 20, 1950. In 1954, Afghanistan established its embassy in Jakarta. The first treaty of friendship between Afghanistan and Indonesia was signed on April 24, 1955.

Popular opinion in Indonesia condemned the 1979 Soviet invasion in Afghanistan. In solidarity, Indonesia took part in 1980 Summer Olympics boycott.

On November 10, 2012, a new treaty of friendship was signed to promotes cooperation in political, economic, trade, academic, education, and cultural sectors. To assist Afghanistan in the education sector and capacity buildings, Indonesia agreed to recruiting more Afghan students to study in Indonesian universities, training Afghan teachers and lecturers, and training the Afghan national police in public order, traffic management, and criminal investigation.

== State visits ==
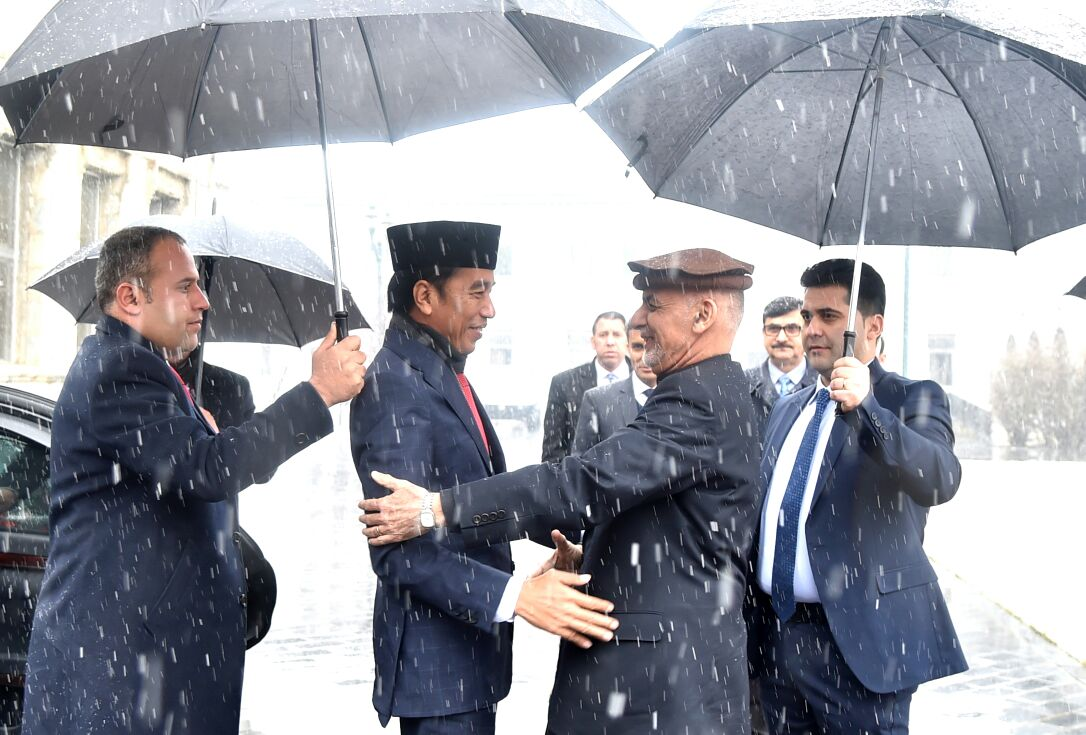
Joko Widodo with Afghan president Ghani in 2018

Indonesia's first president Sukarno visited Afghanistan in 1961. In November 2012, Afghanistan President Hamid Karzai visited Indonesia to attend the fifth Bali Democracy Forum (BDF) in Nusa Dua, Bali. In January 2018, Indonesian president Joko Widodo visited Afghanistan.

== Illegal immigrants ==
After the US-led war in Afghanistan, Indonesia faces tides of Afghan illegal immigrant problems. Afghanistan refugees fled the turmoil in their country, using Indonesia as a stepping-stone in their efforts to reach Australia. Over the years, scores of Afghan illegal migrants were caught and detented in Indonesia, some has been repatriated back to Afghanistan. Afghanistan is included in Indonesia's immigration red list. Because of security reasons, Afghanistan is among 13 countries whose citizens are required to provide specific documents to enter Indonesia.

== Status after 2021 Fall of Kabul and Reopening ==
In the aftermath of the 2021 Fall of Kabul, former vice president Jusuf Kalla believed that Indonesia will not sever the diplomatic connection between Indonesia and Afghanistan. He cited the past, noting that Indonesia had not severed ties with Afghanistan even during the previous Taliban rule from 1996 to 2001, adding that the Indonesian embassy was still active at the time. Indonesia still maintained the relationship onwards from the Taliban's initial downfall up to the end of the Islamic Republic of Afghanistan. On 16 August 2021, following the fall of Kabul, the Indonesian Ministry of Foreign Affairs issued a notification stating that the ministry was analyzing situation, preparing an evacuation plan of Indonesian citizens and embassy staff, and relegating operations at the embassy itself to a "limited essential level." On 20 August 2021, the Indonesian Ministry of Foreign Affairs along with the Indonesian Air Forces evacuated the Indonesian citizens and embassy staff out from Kabul.

On the occasion of Indonesian Independence Day, the Taliban government, through its spokesperson, Suhail Syahidin, issued messages congratulating Indonesia. He claimed that what the Taliban did in ousting the previous government is similar to what Indonesia did in expelling occupying forces in the past. He also assured that the Taliban government will protect all foreigners, including Indonesian citizens in Afghanistan.

Indonesian constitutional experts have urged the Indonesian government to not hastily recognize Afghanistan under the Taliban government as they deemed the transfer of power to have taken place without constitutional means. These concerns were voiced on 17 August 2021 and were formalized with a statement by the Commission of Constitutional Studies of People's Consultative Assembly three days later. A similar stance was taken against Myanmar under the military junta in aftermath of the 2021 Myanmar coup d'état. On 25 August 2021, Regional Representative Council also issued the same statement.

On 26 August 2021, Minister of Foreign Affairs Retno Marsudi met Taliban officials and representatives in Qatar. In the meeting, she urged to her Taliban counterpart to (1) ensure stability and prosperity of Afghanistan, (2) formation of inclusive government, (3) maintaining respect, dignities, and basic rights to Afghanistan women.

Since 21 August 2021, Indonesian Embassy in Kabul had been closed for security reasons. Activities and services for Afghanistan affairs for Indonesia are performed by Indonesian Embassy in Pakistan at Islamabad. From all staff in former Indonesian Embassy in Kabul, only 4 staffs left and now stationed at Islamabad, with one charge d'affaires leading the diplomatic mission to maintain Indonesia-Afghanistan relations.

Indonesia reopened its embassy in Kabul on 14 February 2022. Despite the embassy reopening, the Indonesian government remained not acknowledging Taliban government. Afghanistan's embassy in Jakarta is operated by the Taliban, led by Chargé d'Affaires Sadullah Baloch.
