= Habibullah Khan Tarzi =

Afghan diplomat

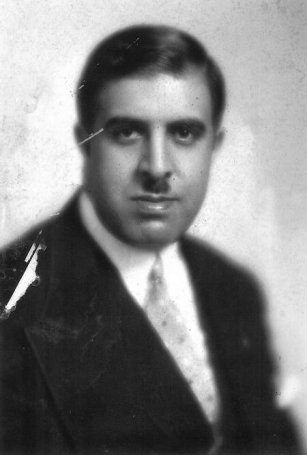

Afghan Representative to France
- In office 1928–1929

Afghan Representative to Japan
- In office 1933–1939

2nd Ambassador of Afghanistan to the United States
- In office 1946–1953
- Monarch: Zahir Shah
- Preceded by: Abdul Hussain Aziz
- Succeeded by: Mohammed Kabir Ludin

Personal details
- Born: 1896 Emirate of Afghanistan

Habibullah Khan Tarzi (Pashto: حبيب الله خان طرزي, born 1896) was an Afghan diplomat and politician.

Habibullah Khan Tarzi was considered to be a scion of the country's leading political family.

He was the head of the Afghan Delegation to Paris from 1923 to 1924. He served in that post to increase diplomatic and economic relations between France and Afghanistan. Tarzi would go on to play critical roles in the Afghan foreign affairs as the Temporary Representative to France from 1928 to 1929, and Japan from 1933 to 1939. During that time, Sayyid Mushir Khan Tarzi, a relative of Habibullah Khan Tarzi, wrote an article about the Islam in Japan. Habibullah Tarzi became the Deputy Minister of Foreign Affairs for Afghanistan from 1932 to 1933. He took a few years off after his post in Japan, however, and stayed with his family.

It was not until 1946, when he was named as a Temporary Representative to China, that Tarzi would return to international politics. After less than a year in China, he would present his credentials to President Harry S. Truman as Afghanistan's Ambassador Extraordinary and Plenipotentiary to the United States of America. After developing a very friendly relationship with President Truman, Tarzi would stay at that post in Washington, D.C. from 1946 to 1953. Shortly after President Dwight D. Eisenhower came to office, Tarzi left the United States and returned to Kabul.

Tarzi and his wife Shahira Begum Tarzi had four sons and three daughters. His father in law, the mother of Shahira was Habibullah Beg. Habibullah Khan's third son was Hamidullah Khan who married Mariam Begum, the daughter of Ghulam Yahya Khan Tarzi and a brother of Abdullah Khan Tarzi who fought in the Anglo-Afghan War of 1919. (Note: The Daughter-in-Law of Habibullah Khan Tarzi, Mariam Begum is the sister of Abdullah Khan Tarzi)

== Literature ==
- Sayyid Mushir Khan Tarzi: Islam dar Japan, in: Kabul magazine, vol. 10 (1936?), pp. 71–83.

== See also ==
- Politics of Afghanistan
