= Roya Rahmani =

Afghan diplomat (born 1978)

- رؤیا رحمانی
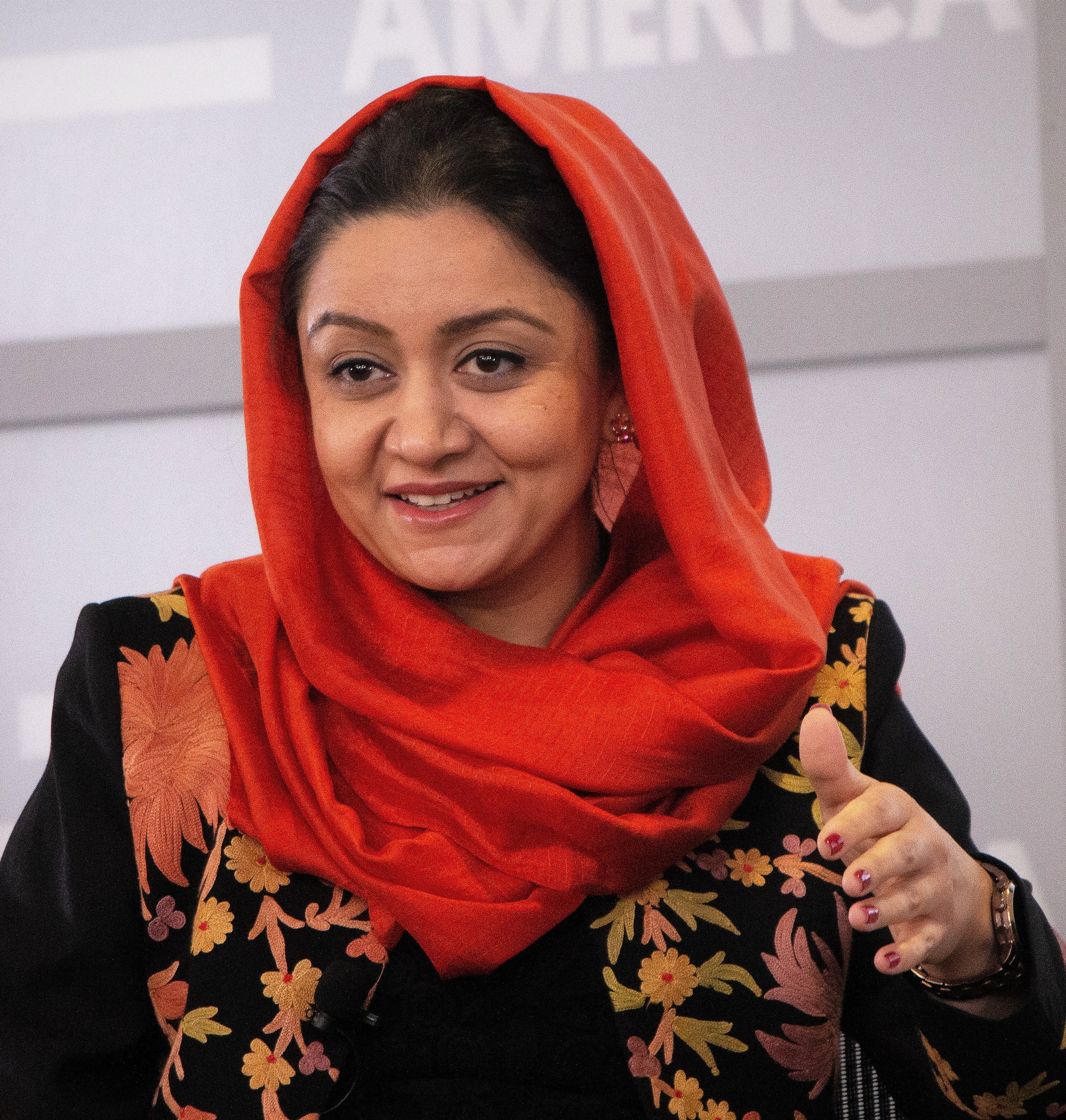
- Rahmani in 2019

Ambassador of Afghanistan to the United States
- In office 14 December 2018 – 13 July 2021
- President: Ashraf Ghani
- Preceded by: Hamdullah Mohib
- Succeeded by: Adela Raz

Personal details
- Born: 1978 (age 47–48) Kabul, Afghanistan
- Education: McGill University (BSc); Columbia University (MPA)

Roya Rahmani (Dari: رؤیا رحمانی; born May 1978) is a former Afghan diplomat who served as Afghanistan's first female ambassador to the United States and non-resident ambassador to Mexico, Argentina, Colombia, and the Dominican Republic from December 2018 to July 2021. She is currently the Director of Global Engagement at the World Bank Group. She serves as the Chair of the international advisory company in development finance — Delphos International LTD. She is also a distinguished fellow at the Georgetown Institute for Women, Peace, and Security, a senior advisor at the Atlantic Council's South Asia Center, and a senior fellow for international security at the New America Foundation. From 2016 to 2018, she served as Afghanistan's first female ambassador to Indonesia, first ever ambassador to the Association of Southeast Asian Nations, and non-resident ambassador to Singapore.

Previously, she worked in the Ministry of Foreign Affairs, as the first Director General of Regional Cooperation (2012-2016).

Before entering government, she worked for several nonprofits that primarily focused on women's rights and education. She received a bachelor's degree in software engineering from McGill University in 2003 and a master's degree in public administration and international law at Columbia University in 2009.

== Early life and education ==
Rahmani was born in Kabul in 1978, a year before Soviet troops invaded Afghanistan. After the Soviets left in 1989, the country descended into civil war. Her school was closed for months at a time due to the missiles hitting the city. In 1993, her family fled to Pakistan. She recalls “Starting in the ’90s, there was famine and drought, and during the 1992-96 civil war, we were literally pushed out of our homes. I remember our family hugging each other, thinking this would be the last night of our lives”.

Once in Peshawar, she attended a Saudi-funded school for refugees, where she later recalled studying on the roof for an entire school year due to overcrowding. Rahmani commented on her experiences saying that "As an Afghan woman, very early on, like the rest of my cohort, we learned that you have to try to make the best out of what you have. So uncertainty was what dominated most of our lives." She says the experiences of her youth led her to the lifelong motto of "doing the best with what you have".

Rahmani returned to Kabul in 1998, but refused to leave the house rather than put on a burqa as the Taliban required. In 1999, she received a scholarship from the World University Service of Canada and went to McGill University, where she completed a bachelor's degree in software engineering. After graduating in 2004, Rahmani returned to Afghanistan and worked for various nonprofits, eventually deciding to alter her career focus and return to school. She says "It became like a mission in my life that if I could do anything, anything, to stop a bomb from going off and killing people, or even a person, if I could do that, my mission in life is completed."

In 2009, she completed a master's degree in public administration and international law at Columbia University in New York. She was a Fulbright scholar.

== Career ==
=== Nonprofit Work ===
After graduating with her bachelor's degree in 2004, Rahmani returned to Afghanistan and worked for several Canadian nonprofits focusing on human rights, women's empowerment, and education. She also worked part-time as a subject matter expert with the NATO Joint Forces Training Center, and a consultant to the New York Department of Education, the United Nations Secretariat in New York, the Department of Trade and International Affairs of Canada, Canadian Women for Women in Afghanistan, Women Living under Muslim Laws, and other INGOs.

During this time Rahmani worked on a marriage document that secured equitable rights for the family and contributed to data collection at a national level. She received the Best Human Rights Activist Award from the Afghanistan Independent Human Rights Commission in 2007 for her work on this document.

=== Government Work ===
Rahmani joined the Afghan government, first in the Ministry of Education, then as a senior advisor to the Deputy Foreign Minister in 2011. From 2012 to 2016, she served as the Ministry of Foreign Affairs Director General for Regional Cooperation. In this role she initiated and promoted important regional cooperation initiatives, like the Heart of Asia-Istanbul Process.

==== Ambassador to Indonesia ====
From June 2016-December 2018, Rahmani served as Afghanistan's first female ambassador to Indonesia, non-resident ambassador to Singapore, and first ever ambassador to the Association of Southeast Asian Nations. She was the second woman appointed as an ambassador by President Ashraf Ghani, after he vowed to give women more leadership positions. She said Muslim women could introduce a narrative of a "dynamic Muslim", proving that religion is not a static force.

==== Ambassador to the United States ====
On 14 December 2018, Rahmani was appointed Ambassador to the United States by President Ghani, the first woman to hold the position. She took up the post just as President Trump announced his intention to withdraw troops from her country. She said, "women have been treated like a minority, but they are not a minority. Together, the women and the youth are actually a majority, and they are not willing to give up their rights. They are not willing to compromise their human rights and go back to the old days." She replaced Hamdullah Mohib, who had resigned three months earlier to become National Security Advisor.

Ambassador Rahmani also served as Afghanistan's non-resident ambassador to Mexico, Argentina, Colombia, and the Dominican Republic.

=== Issues ===
==== Women's rights ====
Rahmani spent several years working at nonprofits that focused on women's rights and education. At this time, her work focused particularly on family law reform in the Muslim context. She worked with Musawah to reform a marriage contract in Afghanistan to ensure more equitable family rights. Rahmani and Musawah "decided to prioritise the marriage contract because it seemed to be a feasible and practical remedy to secure the rights of women within families. Amending the family law required complex procedures, whereas the marriage contract only needed the Supreme Court’s approval”.

Rahmani also took part in the inaugural Indonesian Congress of Women Ulama while serving as ambassador to Indonesia. She encouraged the formation of more women's ulamas, saying "It's time to get angry about violence committed in the name of our religion that we practice every day to seek refuge and peace."

After becoming ambassador to the United States, she continued to advocate for women's rights, especially women's role in the peace process. She has consistently said that a peace deal that ignores half of the population will not work. She argues the essential role of women in the peace process makes women's rights not just an ethical issue, but a matter of national security.

After the taliban's comeback to power in August 2021 and the following worsening of women's rights in the country, Roya Rahmani has been especially vocal about this situation. Women who protest for their rights in the streets of Kabul and other cities are “basically committing suicide,” Rahmani said.

==== Peace process ====
In May 2019, Rahmani criticized the Trump government after Ambassador Zalmay Khalilzad engaged in direct talks with the Taliban, who have rejected engaging in talks with the Afghan government, saying "They are not our government, they are not our representatives" and that ending the war "should be decided by the people who are most affected by the process."

TIME Magazine referred to Rahmani as "a fierce advocate for peace on Afghan terms". She has spoken repeatedly on the need for the Taliban to directly engage with Afghan society and government if they are to become a part of it. According to Rahmani, "if [the Taliban] want peace, they would have to sit with the government."

== Awards and Recognitions ==
- In 2007, Rahmani was awarded the Best Human Rights Activist Award by the Afghanistan Independent Human Rights Commission for her work on a marriage document that secured equitable rights for the family and contributed to data collection at a national level.
- In 2017, her work in Indonesia led her to be named “The People’s Ambassador” by Tatler Indonesia.
- In 2019, she was included on TIME Magazine's "100 Next List" because she was a “fierce advocate of peace on Afghan terms.”
- In 2019, she was recognized by the Alliance for Peacebuilding for her efforts to create an inclusive peace process.

== Controversies ==
Pajhwok Afghan News has released a series of media reports making accusations against Rahmani, including regarding a construction project at the DC embassy. The Afghan Ministry of Foreign Affairs issued a full rejection of their claims, addressing specific accusations made by Pajhwok.

Rahmani released an article via Afghan media platform 8AM denying the accusations and calling for a full investigation. In the article, she said the Pajhwok report was biased, their conclusions contradicted the documents they had published, and that it had been published in order to destroy her personally because she was a woman. She also alleged that she has experienced repeated unfounded attacks from local news agencies.

Indictment documents leaked to TOLOnews show that the Attorney General has accused two former officials and Rahmani of corruption in the construction of a 70-meter wall in Afghanistan’s embassy in Washington, DC. However, TOLOnews reported that there were "a number of contradictions in the text of the indictment paper" and that the Attorney General's Office and case prosecutors were not willing to respond to questions about the contradictions.

The documents also show that the appellate court of the Anti-Corruption Justice Center (ACJC), Afghanistan's primary anti-corruption court, has been asked to try the accused officials on charges of embezzlement of $790,000 from the project. However, the ACJC has said it rejects the allegations and returned the indictment papers to the Attorney General's Office, citing technical and investigative shortcomings. On 31 July 2021, the Washington Post published an investigative report demonstrating that it was a politically motivated case against Rahmani.

All this intervened in a context of violent repression of women rights. In 2014, the government rejected recommendations from UN member countries to abolish prosecution of women for so-called moral crimes. Other setbacks for women’s rights in 2014 included a continuing series of attacks on, threats toward, and assassinations of, high-profile women, including police women and activists, to which the government failed to respond with meaningful measures to protect women at risk.

After the taliban's comeback to power in August 2021, situation regarding women's rights has even worsened. The UN Special Rapporteur on the situation of human rights in Afghanistan, Richard Bennett, appointed in April 2022, undertook his first visit to the country from 15 to 26 May 2022. Bennet also said the erasure of women from public life was especially concerning, citing measures such as the suspension of girls’ secondary education, severe barriers to employment and limits on freedom of movement, association and expression.

== Publications ==
Articles
Date	Title	Source
June 5, 2010	"Condemning Weapon Shows won't stop wars"	Ottawa Citizen
May 1, 2012	"Donors, beneficiaries, or NGOs: whose needs come first? A dilemma in Afghanistan"	Development in Practice Journal
July 21, 2019	"Pakistan can benefit from a stable and thriving Afghanistan"	CNN
September 27, 2019	"Amb. Roya Rahmani: Elections in Afghanistan are critical -- They need US support on the path toward peace"	Fox News
May 16, 2020	“Afghanistan’s two wars: terrorism and the coronavirus”	The Hill
July 2020	"هتک‌ حرمت زیر نام آزادی بیان" Translation: "Freedom of Expression or Attack on Dignity"	8AM
August 10, 2020	“Afghan Women Should Be the Centerpiece of the Peace Process”	Foreign Policy
September 11, 2020	“After the terror of Sept. 11, Sept. 12 is about progress and hope for Afghanistan”	Washington Examiner
January 26, 2021	"Afghanistan’s ambassador: The U.S. must help us build peace for generations to come"	Washington Post
February 2021	"A new lens: Economic diplomacy in Afghanistan"	Global Ambassador's Journal
November 10, 2021	"Afghanistan veterans’ sacrifices were not made in vain"	Atlantic Council
March 8, 2022	"The best path to gender equality is through family law reform"	Al Jazeera
April 3, 2022	"The world must demand the Taliban stop restricting girls' education"	The Washington Post
June 27, 2022	"Women's rights can mitigate climate impacts"	The Ecologist
August 3, 2022	"Experts react: Ayman al-Zawahiri, leader of al-Qaeda, killed by US drone strike in Afghanistan"	Atlantic Council
February 7, 2023	"The women of Afghanistan are suffering – but not forgotten"	The Hill
June 29, 2023	“Women as the Way Forward: Lessons from Afghan Women's Empowerment Journey-And What Can Be Done Now”	Atlantic Council

== Personal life ==
Rahmani is married and has one daughter, born in 2014. She is a Muslim. She is a fluent speaker of Dari, Pashto, and English, and has a basic understanding of Urdu and French.
