= Meerwais Nab =

Afghan diplomat (born 1976)

- میرویس ناب
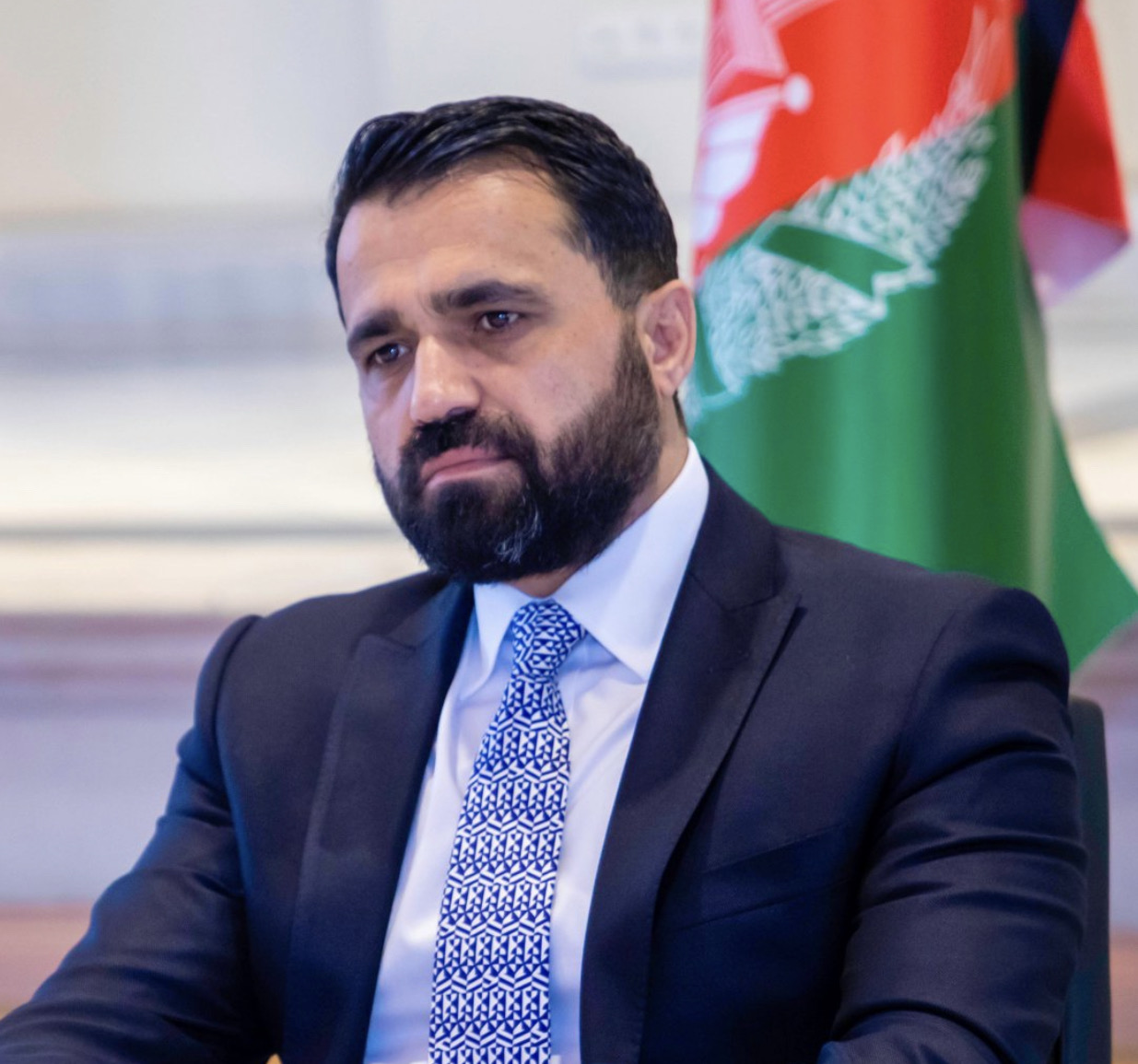
- Born: February 23, 1976 (age 50); Kabul, Afghanistan
- Occupation: Former Deputy Foreign Minister on Political Affairs
- Predecessor: Idrees Zaman

Meerwais Nab, also spelled Mirwais Nab (Pashto/Dari: میرویس ناب, Dari pronunciation:[meːɾwaɪs nɑːb]; born 23 February 1976) is known as an Afghan diplomat, who served as the Deputy Foreign Minister for Political Affairs from April 2020 to August 2021, and Deputy Foreign Minister for Economic and Regional Cooperation. from 2019 to 2020. He was the Ambassador of the Islamic Republic of Afghanistan to Ashgabat, Turkmenistan from 2016 to 2019.

== Early years ==
Meerwais Nab was born on 23 February 1976 in Kabul, Afghanistan. He is the son of Afghanistan's Army General and comes from an educated family. After graduating from Ghulam Haider Khan High School in 1992, he earned his bachelor's and master's degrees in law and political science. He studied at the Faculty of Law and Political Sciences at Kabul University, Department of Private Law and Department of International Relations and at the Faculty of Law and Political Science at the Tajik National University graduating in 1998.

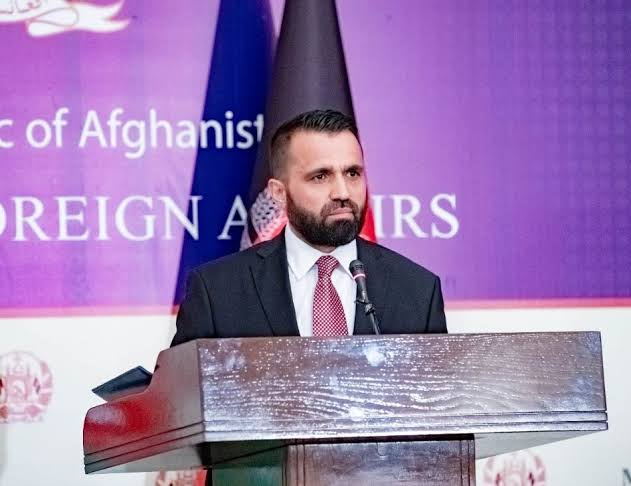
Meerwais Nab

Furthermore, he completed an executive program on the Foreign Policy of the People's Republic of China at the China Foreign Affairs University (CFAU) and received an Advanced Studies Diploma from the George C. Marshall European Center for Security Studies in Garmisch, Germany. In 2014, Nab participated in two Executive Programs for South Asian Leaders at the Harvard Kennedy School, along with training programs at the US National Defense University.

== Career ==
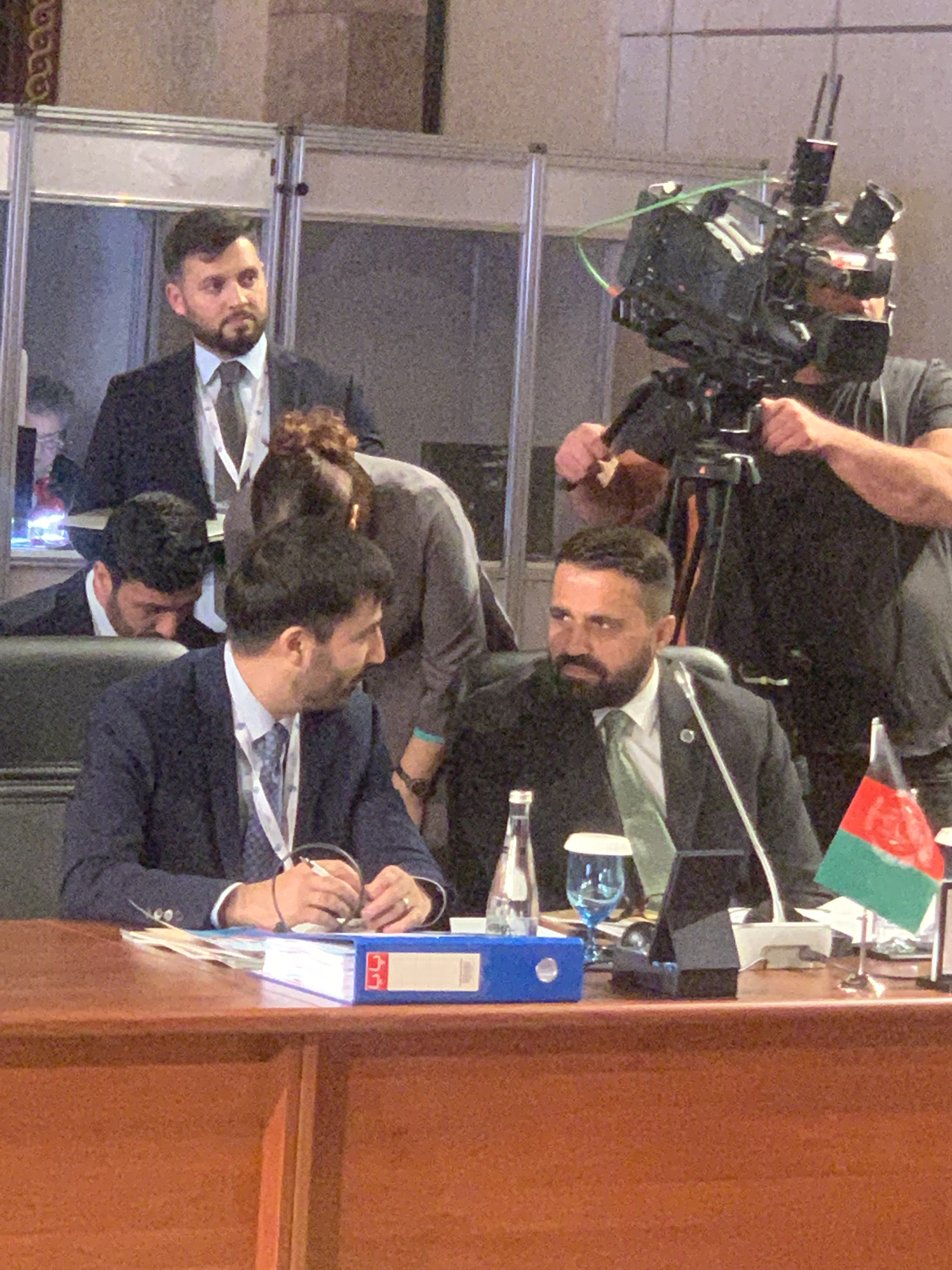
the Heart of Asia - Istanbul Process (HoA-IP)

Nab has held several high-level diplomatic positions throughout his career. From April 2020 to August 2021, he served as Deputy Foreign Minister for Political Affairs of Afghanistan. He also acted as the Acting Foreign Minister during the absence of the minister, leading Afghanistan's diplomatic efforts at the United Nations and other global platforms. Prior to this, from May 2019 to August 2020, Nab was the Deputy Foreign Minister for Economic and Regional Cooperation. He played a key role in initiatives such as the Heart of Asia - Istanbul Process (HoA-IP), Regional Economic Cooperation Conference on Afghanistan (RECCA) aimed at promoting regional integration and economic growth. In April 2021, Meerwais Nab was awarded the Ghazi Mohammad Ayub Khan Medal (2nd rank) by President Ashraf Ghani in recognition of his contributions to foreign affairs, particularly for his role in organizing the 9th, 10th and 11th sessions of the Heart of Asia - Istanbul Process (HoA-IP).

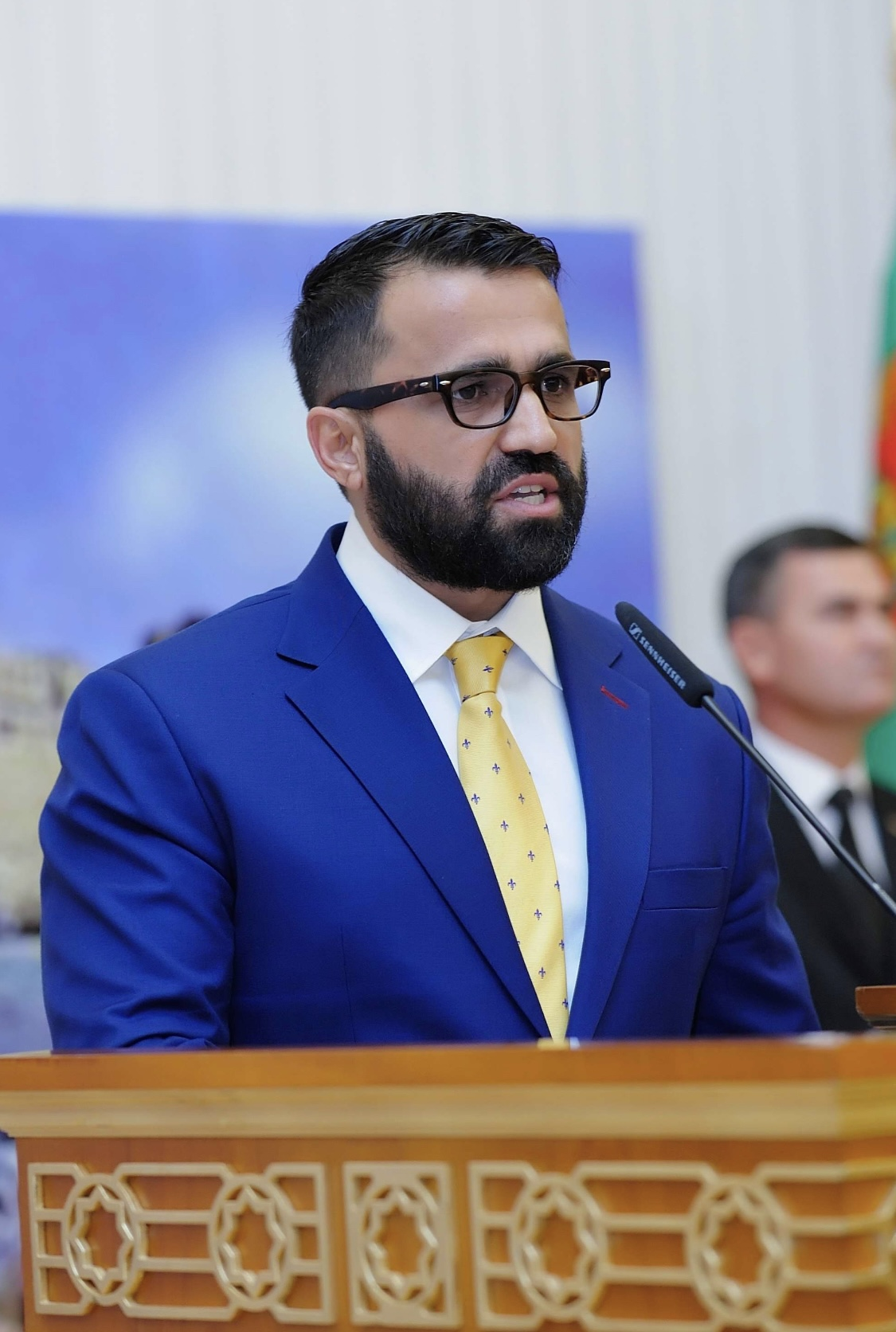
Mirwais Nab in 2019, Ashgabat, Turkmenistan.

From 2016 to 2019, Nab was Afghanistan's Ambassador to Turkmenistan, where he worked to strengthen bilateral relations, including the signing of 57 agreements with Turkmenistan. His tenure saw significant progress on projects such as the TAPI gas pipeline (Turkmenistan–Afghanistan–Pakistan–India Pipeline), TAP500, Railway & Fiber Optic and the Lapis Lazuli Corridor, aimed at improving regional connectivity and trade. He also played a key role in advancing energy cooperation between the two nations, including increasing electricity exports to Afghanistan and expanding infrastructure projects. In recognition of his efforts to boost bilateral relations, he was awarded the Golden Medal “Order of Neutrality” by the President of Turkmenistan.

Earlier in his career, Nab held various diplomatic roles, including Minister Counselor (2013–2014) and Political Counselor (2011–2013) at the Afghan Embassy in Washington, D.C., where he focused on security and defense relations between Afghanistan and the United States. He was involved in negotiations as member of the negotiation team on the Bilateral Security Agreement (BSA) and the Strategic Partnership Agreement (SPA) between Afghanistan and the U.S. He was awarded the 2nd rank Medal for active participation on representing Afghanistan's interest in finalization of bilateral security agreement with the United States in May 2013.

Nab's diplomatic experience also includes positions in Russia and in China, where he served as Chargé affairs at the Afghan Embassy in Beijing in 2009 and as First Secretary from 2006 to 2010, focusing on Afghanistan's relations with China and its role as a land bridge between South and Central Asia.

Meerwais Nab played a key role in foresting collaboration between China and The United States on Afghanistan, focusing on agricultural development, healthcare, and the capacity building of young Afghan diplomats in both Beijing and Washington, D.C. as Minister Counselor and Chargé d'Affaires in Afghanistan embassy in Washington, he inaugurated the third-year training program alongside the Chinese Ambassador to Washington, D.C., and the U.S. Under Secretary of State.

His diplomatic career began with a post as Attaché at the Afghan Embassy in Dushanbe, Tajikistan, from 1999 to 2002, followed by a position in the Ministry of Foreign Affairs in Kabul.

Mr. Meerwais Nab survived two attacks during his diplomatic career. The first occurred in 2018 while he was serving as Afghanistan’s Ambassador to Turkmenistan. During a visit to Faryab Province, Afghanistan, to oversee the survey and feasibility study for the Turkmenistan-Afghanistan-Tajikistan railway project, he was targeted by ISIS. The second attack took place in April 2021, when he was Deputy Foreign Minister for Political Affairs, ambushed by the Taliban while traveling from Islam Qala port to Herat city upon his return from an official visit to Iran.

== See also ==
- Eklil Ahmad Hakimi
- Haneef Atmar
- Ashraf Ghani
- Hamid Karzai
