= Khojesta Fana Ebrahimkhel =

Ambassador Extraordinary and Plenipotentiary of Afghanistan

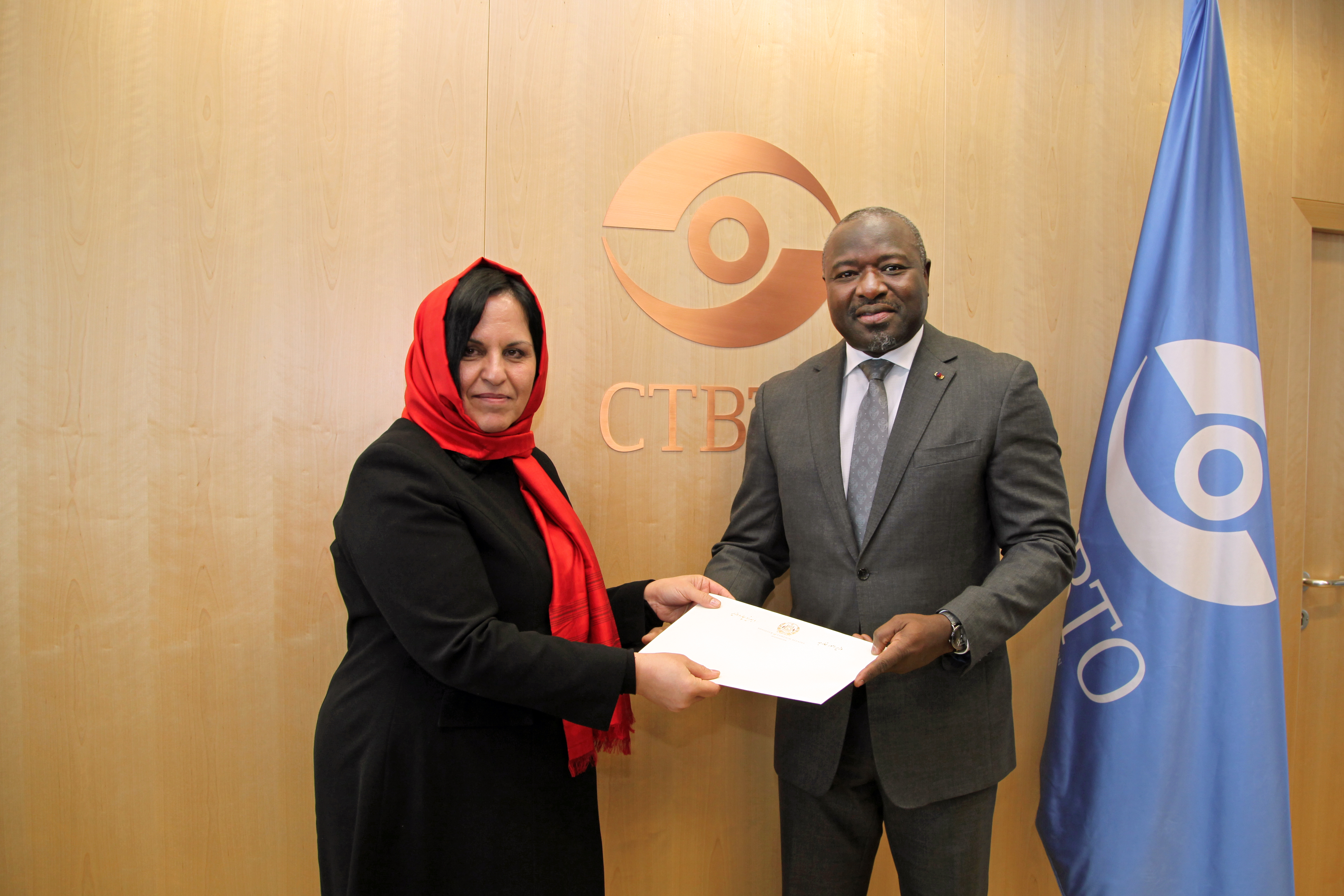
Presentations of Credentials by Khojesta Fana Ebrahimkhel

Khojesta Fana Ebrahimkhel (born 1964, Kabul, Afghanistan) is the Ambassador Extraordinary and Plenipotentiary of Afghanistan to the Republic of Austria (and non-resident to Croatia, Hungary, Liechtenstein, and Slovenia) and as Permanent/Resident Representative to the United Nations Vienna-based organizations including CTBTO, IACA, IAEA, ICMPD, INCB, OSCE, UNIDO, UNOV/UNODC, effective 2017.

Ebrahimkhel was also Chargé d'Affaires a.i. in the United States from 22 September 2010 until 14 February 2011. Ebrahimkhel worked as an attorney for the Attorney-General and as a crime investigator in the Ministry of Foreign Affairs in Kabul before starting her diplomatic career.

She earned a bachelor's degree in Political Science, with specialization in Law and Diplomacy, from Kabul University in 1982. After applying for asylum in Germany, she studied German, mathematics, chemistry and physics at the University of Karlsruhe. Her father is Mohammad Jan Fana.
