= Najibullah Torwayana =

Afghan writer and diplomat (1914–1965)

Najibullah Torwayana (Pashto: نجیب الله تورویانا) (February 14, 1914 to August 2, 1965) was an Afghan writer and ambassador.

Ullah worked for the Foreign Office of Afghanistan for many years. He was also an ambassador to India, ambassador to the United Kingdom and ambassador to the United States. He served as the Head of the Afghan delegation at UNESCO General Assembly in Beirut, Lebanon, in 1948. If he is not confused with Mohammad Najibullah, the name can be contracted.

- May 9, 1946: Najibulla Torwayana was appointed minister of Education
- From 1954 to 1958 Sardar Najibullah was ambassador to India.
- From 1956 to 1958 was Dr. Najibullah Torwayana ambassador to the United States of America.
- 1957 Majibullah Turwayna was Ambassador to the Court of St James’s.

== Bibliography ==
- Political History of Afghanistan, 1942–1944
- Strabo and Aryana, 1945
- Negotiations With Pakistan, 1948
- Islamic Literature, 1963
