= Hamdullah Mohib =

Afghan politician and diplomat

- حمدالله محب
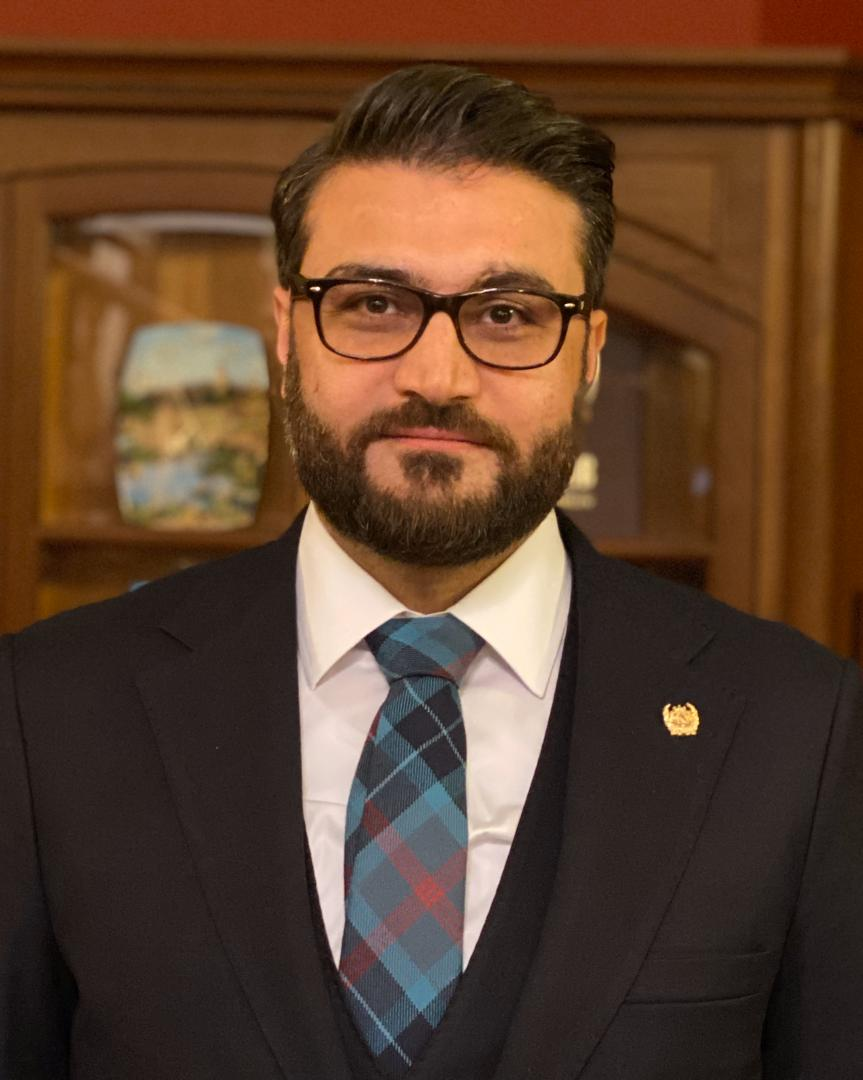
- Mohib in 2020

National Security Adviser of Afghanistan
- In office 25 August 2018 – 15 August 2021
- President: Ashraf Ghani
- Preceded by: Haneef Atmar

Ambassador of Afghanistan to the United States
- In office 1 September 2015 – 26 August 2018
- President: Ashraf Ghani
- Preceded by: Eklil Ahmad Hakimi
- Succeeded by: Roya Rahmani

Personal details
- Born: 1983 (age 42–43) Nangarhar, Afghanistan
- Spouse: Lael Adams (m. 2011)
- Children: 2
- Education: Brunel University London

Hamdullah Mohib (Pashto/Dari: حمدالله محب; born 1983) is a Pashtun Afghan politician and former diplomat.

Educated in England, Mohib was deputy chief of staff to Afghan President Ashraf Ghani and simultaneously Ambassador of Afghanistan to the United States from 2014 to 2018. He was then National Security Adviser of Afghanistan from 2018 to 2021, when he fled the country along with Ghani after the 2021 Taliban offensive, just before the collapse of the Islamic Republic of Afghanistan and the fall of Kabul.

== Early life ==
Hamdullah Mohib was born in a small village north of Jalalabad in 1983. He was the youngest of eleven children. Mohib's father worked in Kabul as a court clerk.

Mohib's family fled Afghanistan during the Soviet war, becoming Afghan refugees. The family returned home after the end of the Soviet invasion, but fled once more to Pakistan after a renewed civil war broke out.

== Education and early career ==
When Mohib was sixteen years old, his family sent him to London. He attended community college and then Brunel University, earning a degree in computer systems engineering, with honors. Upon completion of his degree, Mohib went on to work for Intel Corporation.

After seven years in the UK, Mohib returned to Afghanistan, as director of information technology at the American University of Afghanistan. During the 2009 Afghan presidential election, Mohib worked on the campaign of Afghan Finance Minister Ashraf Ghani, who came in fourth place, losing to incumbent President Hamid Karzai.

Mohib then returned to the UK to study for his Ph.D., at Brunel University, in its School of Engineering and Design. His thesis was entitled "End-to-end 3D video communication over heterogeneous networks"; he earned his Ph.D. in 2014.

Mohib has been a civil society leader in the Afghan community around the world. He started the Afghan Students Association of the United Kingdom, Europe's largest Afghan diaspora student organization. He also formed the Afghan Professionals Network and served as its chairman of the Board (APN). He founded the think tank "Discourse Afghanistan" as part of APN, and he established community service programming to serve special needs orphans in Kabul and to honor Afghan women's achievements.

== Career ==
=== Afghan Ambassador to the United States and Deputy Chief of Staff to Ghani ===
In 2014, the same year he received his Ph.D., Mohib became an aide to Ghani, who won the 2014 Afghan presidential election. After Ghani assumed office, Mohib became his deputy chief of staff; one year later, Mohib was appointed Afghan ambassador to the United States. He was just 32 years old and had no prior diplomatic experience. Mohib also simultaneously served as non-resident ambassador to Mexico, the Dominican Republic, Argentina, and Colombia.

During his tenure as the Deputy Chief of Staff to President Ghani, where he Coordinated and oversaw the office of the spokesperson, correspondence and diplomatic communications, protocol and petitions, as well as the Presidential Secretariat. While at the Presidential Palace, he was responsible for drafting bilateral and multilateral agreements, coordinating with counterparts from the government, and organizing official presidential visits to many other nations. Mohib led Afghanistan's presidential negotiating team for several intergovernmental cooperation agreements and the development of its "Realizing Self-Reliance'" reform strategy.

Mohib formally presented his credentials as Afghan Ambassador to the United States to U.S. President Barack Obama in September 2015. During Mohib's tenure as Ambassador, he focused on issues such as women's empowerment and political participation in Afghanistan.

=== National Security Adviser ===
In August 2018, Ghani appointed Mohib to the post of national security adviser after Mohammad Hanif Atmar abruptly resigned from that post. At the same time, Ghani declined to accept offers of resignation submitted by Defense Minister Tariq Shah Bahrami, Interior Minister Wais Barmak, and National Directorate of Security chief Mohammed Masoom Stanekzai, over policy differences; Ghani asked the trio to remain in office.

==== Role in government ====
Mohib was initially criticized for being too young and inexperienced for the job. As national security advisor, he pushed various tribal, political, and ethnic factions to support a united push for peace, saying that a lack of social cohesion and the many Afghan rivalries impaired national security and the prospect of ending the Taliban insurgency. As one of Ghani's closest aides, Mohib defended Ghani's leadership even as the president's political standing diminished in Kabul and among international allies. Along with Mohammed Masoom Stanekzai, Mohib was the chief negotiator on Ghani's behalf in 2019 and 2020, during the impasse between Ghani and Abdullah Abdullah in the aftermath of the 2019 Afghan presidential election, in which both Ghani and Abdullah claimed victory and took the oath of office, triggering a political crisis. The two rivals signed a power-sharing deal in May 2020. Mohib himself was viewed as a possible future Afghan president.

Over the Eid holidays in May 2020, Mohib visited the gravesite of Mohammad Najibullah in the Melan graveyard in Gardez, eastern province of Paktia. Najibullah was Afghan president from 1986 and 1992; he was the last president of the Soviet-backed Democratic Republic of Afghanistan, but turned to Afghan nationalism in his final years. Najibullah was tortured and killed by the Taliban in 1996. He remains a divisive and polarizing figure in Afghanistan, reviled by some Afghans due to his association with the Soviet invasion, as well as his brutality as head of the Soviet-supported Afghan secret police, but recalled favorably by some Pashtun nationalists who regarded Najibullah as a patriot and promoter of national reconciliation. Mohib's surprise visit marked the first time a senior member of an Afghan government paid a visit to Najibullah's grave. The visit was seen as an attempt to remind Afghans of the brutality of the Taliban while also appealing to Afghan nationalists.

As Ghani's national security adviser, Mohib sometimes exercised direct control of military operations despite having no military experience. He issued orders that bypassed the ordinary chain of command and called unit commanders directly, sometimes to direct specific targets and troop deployments. Mohib made appointments of district commanders and police chiefs that sometimes went against the desires of local leaders.

==== Relations with U.S. and position on Taliban talks ====
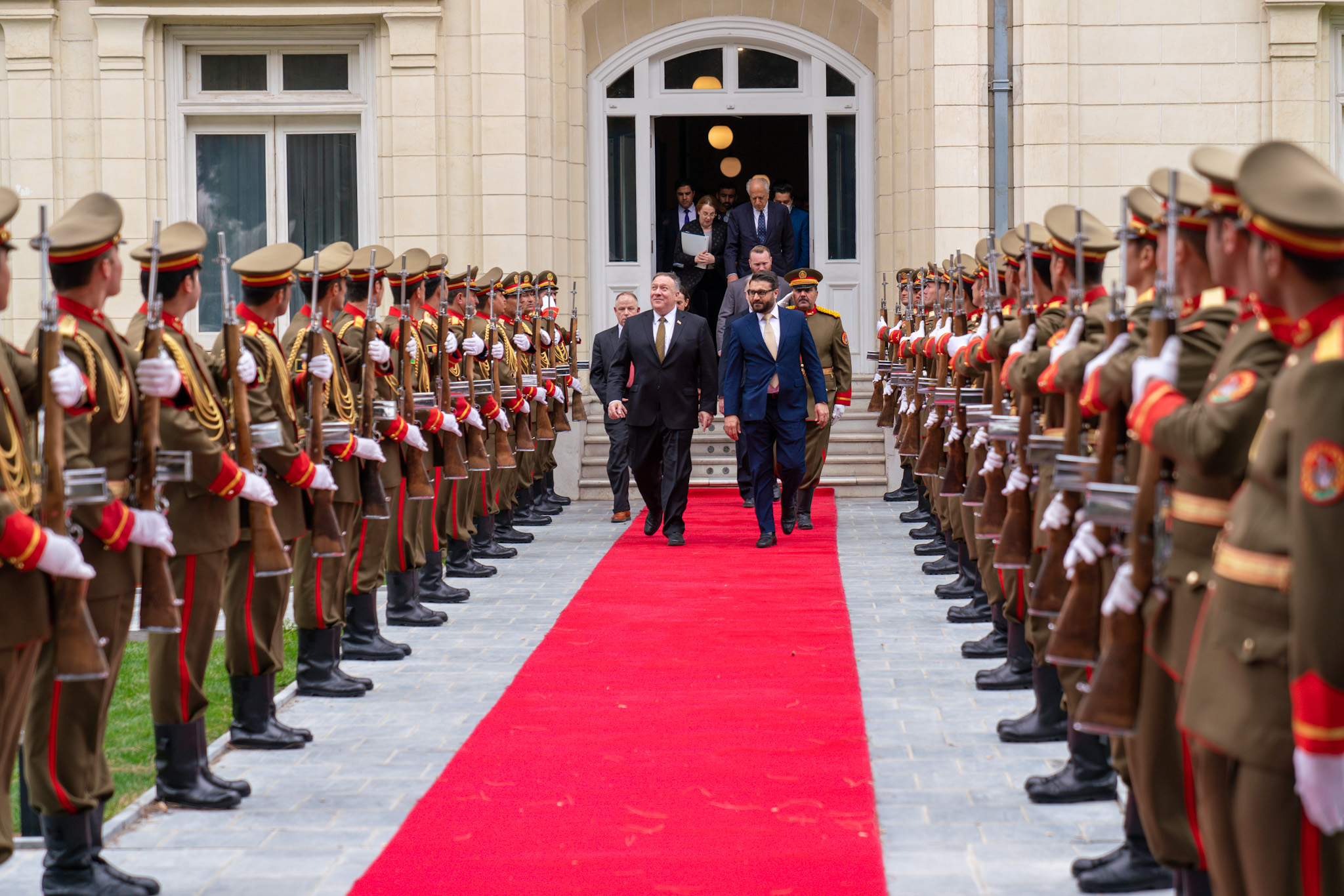
Mohib with U.S. Secretary of State Mike Pompeo at the Presidential Palace in Kabul, March 23, 2020.

Peace talks had been stalled for years due to the Taliban's refusal to speak with the U.S.-backed Afghan government; the Taliban viewed Ghani, and his predecessor Hamid Karzai, as puppets who lacked legitimacy, and insisted on negotiating only with the U.S. government and its NATO allies. In 2020, President Donald Trump appointed a special envoy, Zalmay Khalilzad, to negotiate directly with the Taliban, which had representatives in Doha, Qatar; the negotiations cut out the Afghan government. As national security adviser, Mohib conveyed the Ghani administration's frustration and anger at the Trump administration's choice to cut out the Afghan government from direct U.S.-Taliban peace negotiations, a reversal of the prior longstanding U.S. policy of refusing to negotiate with the Taliban without the participation of the Afghan government.

In a March 2019 conference in Washington, D.C., Mohib accused the U.S. "delegitimizing" the Afghan government in Kabul by excluding it from the peace talks in Doha, in which Khalilzad was the leading U.S. negotiator. Mohib accused Khalilzad, who unsuccessfully ran for president of Afghanistan in 2009 and 2014, of seeking to become a "viceroy" and being motivated by personal political ambition. Mohib accused Khalilzad of showing disrespect for the Afghan government and Afghan security forces by "colluding and conspiring" with the Taliban enemy. The day following Mohib's remarks, U.S. Under Secretary of State for Political Affairs David Hale informed President Ghani in a phone call that the U.S. government would cut ties with Mohib, and that he would no longer be officially received in Washington or by U.S. civilian and military officials. Mohib was subsequently shunned by U.S. diplomats who walked out of meetings or refused to attend meetings with Mohib, and pressured U.S. allies to do the same. In addition to angering the U.S., Mohib's comments were criticized by some of the Ghani administration's political rivals, such as Haneef Atmar and Shaida Mohammad Abdali. Others, such as MP Zakaria Zakaria, said that Mohib's comments were truthful and honest. The former U.S. Special Representative for Afghanistan and Pakistan Daniel Feldman said that the issue should not negatively affect U.S.-Afghan relations. Mohib did later meet with U.S. officials, including on the sidelines of the 2020 Munich Security Conference and in January 2021, when Mohib and Khalilzad met in Kabul.

The Afghan government had said it was willing to directly negotiate with the Taliban without preconditions, but in late October 2019, Mohib announced the Afghan government's reversal of this policy, outlining a new demand that the Taliban agree to a cease-fire before engaging in negotiations. Mohib described the precondition as a test of whether the Taliban could actually exert control over its commanders and militant forces.

The Doha talks between the U.S. and the Taliban lasted nearly a year before abruptly collapsing in September 2019 following a tweet from Trump. Negotiations resumed, however, and in 2020, the Trump administration and the Taliban signed the Agreement for Bringing Peace to Afghanistan. In the agreement, the Taliban agreed to "start intra-Afghan negotiations" and the U.S. pledged to withdraw military combat forces by May 2021. The Taliban did not honor its commitments. The U.S. pressured Ghani to negotiate with the Taliban, viewing the Afghan president as obstreperous, and Ghani was unwilling to give up power. The U.S.-Taliban agreement includes several secret written annexes and verbal agreements, including a contentious provision prohibiting the U.S. from assisting Afghan troops in "offensive" operations against the Taliban. The U.S. and the Taliban disagreed about the scope of this provision. When the Taliban failed to keep promises made in the Doha Agreement, the Trump administration ignored the violations. Mohib said that, Ghani felt lied to. He was undermined."

In February 2021, Mohib urged the U.S. not to withdraw its forces from Afghanistan, asserting that two years more were necessary before Afghan security forces could operate without foreign support. Mohib said that: "We expect that in the next couple of years we will be fully self-reliant, capable of independently carrying out our security responsibilities, even if there was no peace with the Taliban."

=== Fall of Kabul ===
In the summer of 2021, the Taliban seized control of much of the country, and the new U.S. Biden administration decided to continue with the U.S. withdrawal from Afghanistan. Ghazni fell on August 12, and Kandahar and Herat the following day. Under siege, Dostum fled to Uzbekistan, as did Ata Mohammad Noor, a powerful and independent leader in the north. The U.S. government arranged a major evacuation effort from Hamid Karzai International Airport. Ghani and Mohib first discussed the possibility of fleeing the country in late July 2021. On August 14, more provinces fell to the Taliban. The same day, after learning that one of his colleagues at the Presidential Palace was on a list of "at-risk" Afghans approved by the U.S. Embassy for evacuation in the event, Mohib asked the U.S. State Department to include him and Ghani in the U.S. evacuation plan "in case the political settlement doesn't work." Fearing that the U.S. would not rescue Ghani and his top aides, Mohib obtained assurances from a United Arab Emirates official who told him that the UAE would send an executive jet to Kabul on August 16 to evacuate Ghani and his aides.

On August 15, as Taliban forces assembled outside Kabul, Mohib learned from the Signal group chat with the Afghan government's top intelligence and security officials that the Taliban were arriving in Kabul, and policemen, soldiers, and guards in Kabul were abandoning their uniforms and posts. That morning, Ross L. Wilson, the U.S. chargé d'affaires in Kabul, concluded from Resolute Support surveillance blimp data and other sources that the Kabul Green Zone was no longer secure. Washington ordered all U.S. personnel at embassy to immediately evacuate to Kabul's airport. Fearing a leak to the Taliban or the Islamic State, Wilson did not tell Ghani about the evacuation or the U.S. determination that the Green Zone was no longer secure. That afternoon, Mohib spoke to Khalil Haqqani, a leader of the Taliban's Haqqani network, who asked him to surrender and suggested a meeting. Mohib called Tom West, Khalilzad's deputy in Doha, to tell him about the conversation with Haqqani. West advised him that the suggestion to meet might be an attempt to lure Mohib into a trap. That afternoon, as Kabul collapsed, Ghani, his wife Rula Ghani, Mohib, and nine other top officials fled the country, along with did Ghani's security detail. Mohib was the one who said: "It's time, Mr. President. We have to leave." The group fled to Termez, Uzbekistan.

=== Exile ===
After fleeing Afghanistan, Mohib traveled to the UAE. He gave interviews and participated in public discussions about Afghan government's collapse. Mohib said that blame for the Afghan government's collapse was widely distributed, and that those with a share of the responsibility included Afghan government officials and Ghani, as well as the Afghan government's allies in the international community. Mohib rejected President Joe Biden's assessment that "Afghanistan political leaders gave up and fled the country" and that Afghans lacked the "will to fight" for their own future; he also criticized the Trump administration for cutting the Afghan government out of the U.S.-Taliban talks (arguing that this key decision led to the ultimate collapse of the Afghan government), for failing to provide close air support to the Afghan National Army in its fight against the Taliban, and for a rapid drawdown of U.S. troops. In 2022, Mohib voluntarily met with the U.S. Special Inspector General for Afghanistan Reconstruction; he acknowledged that the collapsed Afghan government had been rife with corruption, but defended Ghani against claims that the exiled president was personally corrupt.

Taliban deputy spokesman Ahmadullah Wasiq claimed in a November 2021 tweet that the UAE had banned on Ghani officials living in exile in the Emirates, including Mohib, Atta Muhammad Nur, and Ghani himself, from engaging in Afghan politics. The following month, Mohib confirmed in a Face the Nation interview that while being hosted by the government of the United Arab Emirates, he and other Ghani officials in exile respected the UAE's policy that "they don't want any political activity."

== Personal life ==
Mohib married Lael Adams (born 1987), an American expert on Afghanistan, in 2011.

Mohib is fluent in English, Pashto, and Dari, and is proficient in Urdu and Hindi.

== Awards and recognition ==
In 2018, Mohib was named one of the World Economic Forum's Young Global Leaders.

== Works by Mohib ==
- Former Afghan national security advisor, spoke about what went wrong, who's to blame, and what lies in store for his country, Foreign Policy (January 22, 2022).
- Collapse And Consequences In Afghanistan: A Conversation with Hamdullah Mohib, Hoover Institution (January 12, 2022).
- Full transcript: Hamdullah Mohib on "Face the Nation", CBS News (December 19, 2021).
- Ex-Afghan National Security Adviser Recalls The Fall Of the Republic, Gandhara (December 17, 2021).
- Afghan National Security Advisor Talks Future Of The Country, NPR (July 14, 2021).
- Afghan security chief on his country's future, CBS NEWS (May 18, 2021).
- Yet to see a change in Taliban's posture: Afghan NSA Hamdullah Mohib, The Economic Times (March 24, 2021).
- Transcript: Prospects for Peace: A Conversation with Afghanistan's National Security Advisor, Hudson Institute (March 23, 2021)
- Taliban Want Absolute Power: Hamdullah Mohib, Didpress Agency (February 14, 2021).
- A Conversation With National Security Advisor Hamdullah Mohib of Afghanistan, Council on Foreign Relations (October 1, 2019).
- Afghanistan: National Security Advisor Hamdullah Mohib, Asia Society (October 1, 2019).
- Hamdullah Mohib, Chair of Delegation of Afghanistan, addresses the general debate of the 754th session, UN ( September 20, 2019).
- The Future of U.S.-Afghanistan Relations: A view from Afghanistan, Hudson Institute (March 15, 2019).
- Trump envoy is selling out Afghanistan in Taliban peace talks: senior Afghan official, (March 14, 2019).
- Security Council Debate on the Situation in Afghanistan, UN (March 11, 2019).
- One on One: Interview with Hamdullah Mohib, National Security Adviser of Afghanistan, TRT world (February 22, 2019).
- Afghan government, struggling with war fronts and peace bids, forms new team of rivals and loyalists, The Washington Post (January 10, 2019).
- Grateful that US is Interested in peace, but peace must be Afghan-led, Afghan-owned: Hamdullah Mohib, ThePrint (January 7, 2019).
- Mohib: We 'must end' Afghan war, BBC HARDtalk (October 23, 2018).
- Champions for Change: Afghan Ambassador Hamdullah Mohib, Council on Foreign Relations (July 10, 2018).
- Ambassador Hamdullah Mohib Brings Positive Message About His Country, KGOU (April 21, 2017).
- Letter to the Editor: An Ashraf Ghani Government in Afghanistan Would Give Out Jobs Only Based on Merit, Washington Post (September 22, 2016).
- How Afghanistan Can Succeed, CNN (September 30, 2015).
- A Grassroots Democracy for Afghanistan, Foreign Policy (June 27, 2011).

== See also ==
- Afghans in the United Kingdom
- Embassy of Afghanistan, Washington, D.C.

Political offices
Preceded by Haneef Atmar	National Security Adviser of Afghanistan; 2018-2021	Succeeded by the post is abolished
Political offices
Preceded by Eklil Ahmad Hakimi	Afghan ambassador to the United States; 2015-2018	Succeeded by Roya Rahmani
