= List of ambassadors of Afghanistan to the United States =

Ambassador of the Islamic Republic of Afghanistan to the United States
- Flag of Afghanistan
- Status: Office abolished
- Seat: Washington, D.C.
- Nominator: President of Afghanistan
- Formation: June 4, 1943 (original); 2002 (most recent)
- First holder: Abdul Hussain Aziz
- Final holder: Adela Raz
- Abolished: February 18, 2022
- Website: afghanembassy.us/the-ambassador (dead) (7 March 2022 archive)

The ambassador of the Islamic Republic of Afghanistan to the United States of America was the official diplomatic representative of the Islamic Republic of Afghanistan to the United States. The ambassador and the embassy staff at large worked at the Afghan Embassy in the Kalorama neighborhood of Washington, D.C. The last ambassador of the Islamic Republic of Afghanistan was Adela Raz, who succeeded Roya Rahmani in July 2021. In February 2022, Raz resigned. The embassy and consulates closed the following month, and all diplomatic and consular activities stopped.

== List ==
No.	Name	Title	Appointment	Presentation	Termination	Appointer
Kingdom of Afghanistan
1	Abdul Hussain Aziz	Minister	1943	4 June 1943	1946	King Mohammed Zahir Shah
2	Habibullah Khan Tarzi	Ambassador Extraordinary and Plenipotentiary	1946	1946	1953	King Mohammed Zahir Shah
3	Mohammed Kabir Ludin	Ambassador Extraordinary and Plenipotentiary	1953	–	1956	King Mohammed Zahir Shah
4	Najib Ullah	Ambassador Extraordinary and Plenipotentiary	1956	–	1958	King Mohammed Zahir Shah
5	Mohammad Hashim Maiwandwal	Ambassador Extraordinary and Plenipotentiary	1958	–	1963	King Mohammed Zahir Shah
6	Abdul Majid	Ambassador Extraordinary and Plenipotentiary	1963	–	1967	King Mohammed Zahir Shah
7	Abdullah Malikyar	Ambassador Extraordinary and Plenipotentiary	1967	–	1978	King Mohammed Zahir Shah
Republic of Afghanistan
7	Abdullah Malikyar	Ambassador Extraordinary and Plenipotentiary	1967	–	1978	King Mohammed Zahir Shah
Democratic Republic of Afghanistan
8	Abdul Waheed Karim	Ambassador Extraordinary and Plenipotentiary	1977	–	1978	President Sardar Daoud Khan
9	Nur Ahmed Nur	Ambassador Extraordinary and Plenipotentiary	1980	–	1981	Babrak Karmal
–	Mohed Salem Spartak	Chargé d'affaires	1982	–	1984	Babrak Karmal
–	Mohammad Haidar Rafiq	Chargé d'affaires	1984	–	1985	Babrak Karmal
–	Mohammad Ashraf Samimi	Chargé d'affaires	1985	–	1986	Babrak Karmal
10	Rouhullah Erfaqi	Ambassador Extraordinary and Plenipotentiary	1986	–	1987	Babrak Karmal
11	Mia Gul	Ambassador Extraordinary and Plenipotentiary	1988	–	1990	Mohammad Najibullah
–	Abdul Ghafoor Jawshan	Chargé d'affaires	1990	–	1992	Mohammad Najibullah
Islamic State of Afghanistan
–	Abdul Rahim	Chargé d'affaires	1992	–	1994	Burhanuddin Rabbani
–	Yar Mohammad Mohabat	Chargé d'affaires	1994	–	1995	Burhanuddin Rabbani
Northern Alliance of Afghanistan
–	None appointed 1995–2002					
Afghan Transitional Administration
–	Haroun Amin	Chargé d'affaires	2002	–	2002	Hamid Karzai
12	Ishaq Shahyar	Ambassador Extraordinary and Plenipotentiary	2002	–	4 December 2003	Hamid Karzai
13	Said Tayeb Jawad	Ambassador Extraordinary and Plenipotentiary	4 December 2003	–	2010	Hamid Karzai
Islamic Republic of Afghanistan
13	Said Tayeb Jawad	Ambassador Extraordinary and Plenipotentiary	4 December 2003	–	22 September 2010	Hamid Karzai
–	Khojesta Fana Ebrahimkhel	Chargé d'affaires	22 September 2010	–	14 February 2011	Hamid Karzai
14	Eklil Ahmad Hakimi	Ambassador Extraordinary and Plenipotentiary	14 February 2011	23 February 2011	September 2015	Hamid Karzai
15	Hamdullah Mohib	Ambassador Extraordinary and Plenipotentiary	September 2015	September 2015	August 2018	Ashraf Ghani
–	Madina Qasimi	Chargé d'affaires	August 2018	August 2018	December 2018	Ashraf Ghani
16	Roya Rahmani	Ambassador Extraordinary and Plenipotentiary	December 2018	December 2018	July 2021	Ashraf Ghani
17	Adela Raz	Ambassador Extraordinary and Plenipotentiary	26 July 2021		Stepped down 18 February 2022	Ashraf Ghani

Chief of Protocol
