= Abdullah Khan Tarzi =

Afghan statesman

Sardar Abdullah Khan Tarzi (died 1970) was a twentieth century Afghan Statesman from Kandahar province in Afghanistan. As a country "elder," he participated in the national Loya Jirga (loya means "great" or "grand" and jirga means "council" or "assembly"), specifically the one in 1964 that was called by Mohammed Zahir Shah, which acted as a constitutional convention. In and out of office, he was always a key decision maker, as he was a tribal and Pashtun leader in southern Afghanistan.

Abdullah Khan Tarzi was a soldier in the Third Anglo-Afghan War in 1919, which led to Afghan independence from the British. He would fight in that war for over two years. This led to his first role in Afghan politics, as Abdullah Khan Tarzi would become mayor of Kandahar at the age of 18 years. He would rise from being the Mayor of the city to representative of Kandahar province in the Wolesi Jirga, the lower house of the Afghan parliament. After one term, he then took the position of being the governor of the province. Soon after, Abdullah Khan Tarzi reached the Afghan Senate, known as the House of Elders, representing Kandahar province for two terms, he was the leader of the Senate during his final two years. Abdullah Khan Tarzi was one of the few members of the Tarzi's family, since Ghulam Muhammad Tarzi to lead within Afghanistan; traditionally, most notable Tarzi's have served Afghanistan on the international stage.

Abdullah Khan Tarzi died in 1970, leaving behind his wife, four sons and three daughters.

== See also ==
- Politics of Afghanistan
