= Istanbul Process =

Heart of Asia – Afghanistan regional security cooperative (2011–2019)

Heart of Asia - Istanbul Process
- Founded: 2 Nov 2011 - Istanbul, Turkey
- Type: Regional Cooperation Platform (RCP)
- Primary Objective: Regional security and cooperation for a secure and stable Afghanistan and near and extended neighbors
- De facto Secretariat: Kabul, Afghanistan
- Ministerial Conferences: 1st: 2 November 2011, Istanbul, Turkey; 2nd: 14 June 2012, Kabul, Afghanistan; 3rd: 26 April 2013, Almaty, Kazakhstan; 4th: 31 October 2014, Beijing, China; 5th: 9 December 2015, Islamabad, Pakistan; 6th: 4 December 2016, Amritsar, India; 7th: 1 December 2017, Baku, Azerbaijan; 8th: 9 December 2019, Istanbul, Turkey
- Member Countries: Afghanistan; Azerbaijan; China; India; Iran; Kazakhstan; Kyrgyzstan; Pakistan; Russia; Saudi Arabia; Tajikistan; Turkey; Turkmenistan; United Arab Emirates; Uzbekistan
- Website: hoa.gov.af

The Heart of Asia – Istanbul Process (HoA-IP) is an initiative of the Islamic Republic of Afghanistan and the Republic of Turkey, which was officially launched at a conference hosted by Turkey in Istanbul on 2 November 2011. Since then, Afghanistan supported by fourteen participating countries of the heart of Asia region and 16 supporting countries beyond the region as well as 12 regional and international organizations is leading and coordinating this process. It is a platform for promoting regional security, economic and political cooperation centered on Afghanistan through dialogue and a set of Confidence Building Measures (CBMs).

The Istanbul Process was superseded by the Doha Process in February 2020 between the first Trump administration and the Taliban, without involvement of the Islamic Republic government, which since the Doha Agreement has lost its legitimacy. When the Afghan government collapsed on 15 August 2021, after the US-led NATO troops withdrawal and the Taliban's final offensive, it caused Afghanistan's political legitimacy crisis. Since then, the Heart of Asia – Istanbul Process has become dormant.

== Goals of the process ==
The Heart of Asia – Istanbul Process aimed at promoting and strengthening peace, security, stability and prosperity in Afghanistan and in the region through confidence building and enhancing regional cooperation among 15 countries of the heart of Asia region.

The HoA-IP became one of the most interactive voluntary state-groupings in the HoA region. It brought Afghanistan's immediate and extended neighbors as well as international supporters together through the following focus areas:

1. Political consultations
2. Implementation of the Confidence Building Measures (CBMs)
3. Cooperation with regional organizations

== Chairmanship ==
De Facto Secretariat of the Heart of Asia – Istanbul Process: The Directorate General for Regional Cooperation of the Ministry of Foreign Affairs of Afghanistan is acting as the de facto Secretariat of the Process.

Permanent Chair

- Afghanistan

Previous Chairs

- Turkey
- Kazakhstan
- China
- Pakistan
- India
- Azerbaijan

== Membership ==
Current Members

Flag	Map	English short and formal names	Domestic short and formal names	Capital	Population 2021	Area
Flag of Afghanistan		Afghanistan Islamic Republic of Afghanistan	Dari: جمهوری اسلامی افغانستان – افغانستان (Afghānestān – Jomhūrī-ye Eslāmī-ye Afghānestān) Pashto: د افغانستان اسلامي جمهوریت – افغانستان (Afghān̄istān – Afghānistān Islāmī Jumhūrīyat)	Kabul Dari: کابل (Kābul) Pashto: کابل (Kābul)	40,099,462	652,230 km^{2} (251,827 sq mi)
Flag of Azerbaijan		Azerbaijan Republic of Azerbaijan	Azerbaijani: Azǝrbaycan – Azǝrbaycan Respublikası	Baku Azerbaijani: Bakı	10,312,992	86,600 km^{2} (33,436 sq mi)
Flag of China		China People's Republic of China	Chinese: 中国 – 中华人民共和国 (Zhōngguó – Zhōnghuá Rénmín Gònghéguó)	Beijing Chinese: 北京 (Běijīng)	1,425,893,465	9,596,961 km^{2} (3,705,407 sq mi)
Flag of India		India Republic of India	Hindi: भारत – भारत गणराज्य (Bhārat – Bhārat Gaṇarajya)	New Delhi Hindi: नई दिल्ली (Naī Dillī)	1,407,563,842	3,287,263 km^{2} (1,269,219 sq mi)
Flag of Iran		Iran Islamic Republic of Iran	Persian: جمهوری اسلامی ایران – ایران (Īrān – Jomhūrī-ye Eslāmī-ye Īrān)	Tehran Persian: تهران (Tehrān)	083,183,741	1,648,195 km^{2} (636,372 sq mi)
Flag of Kazakhstan		Kazakhstan Republic of Kazakhstan	Kazakh: Қазақстан – Қазақстан Республикасы (Qazaqstan – Qazaqstan Respýblıkasy) Russian: Казахстан – Республика Казахстан (Kazahstan – Respublika Kazahstan)	Nur-Sultan Kazakh: Нұр-Сұлтан Russian: Нур-Султан (Nur-Sultan)	19,196,465	2,724,900 km^{2} (1,052,090 sq mi)
Flag of Kyrgyzstan		Kyrgyzstan Kyrgyz Republic	Kyrgyz: Кыргызстан – Кыргыз Республикасы (Kyrgyzstan – Kyrgyz Respublikasy) Russian: Кыргызстан – Кыргызская Республика (Kyrgyzstan – Kyrgyzskaja Respublika)	Bishkek Kyrgyz: Бишкек (Bishkek) Russian: Бишкек (Biškek)	6,527,743	199,951 km^{2} (77,202 sq mi)
Flag of Pakistan		Pakistan Islamic Republic of Pakistan	English: Pakistan – Islamic Republic of Pakistan Urdu: پَاکِسْتَان – اسلامی جمہوریہ پاکستان (Pākistān —Islāmī Jamhuriyah-e-Pākistān)	Islamabad English: Islamabad Urdu: اسلام آباد (Islāmābād)	231,402,117	881,913 km^{2} (340,509 sq mi)
Flag of Russia		Russia Russian Federation	Russian: Росси́я – Российская Федерация (Rossija – Rossijskaja Federacija)	Moscow Russian: Москва (Moskva)	145,102,755146,748,590 (including Crimea) 144,386,830 (excluding Crimea)	17,098,242 km^{2} (6,601,668 sq mi)
Flag of Saudi Arabia		Saudi Arabia Kingdom of Saudi Arabia	Arabic: السعودية – المملكة العربية السعودية (As Su‘ūdīya – Al Mamlakah al 'Arabīyah as Su‘ūdīyah)	Riyadh Arabic: الرياض (Ar Riyāḑ)	35,950,396	2,149,690 km^{2} (830,000 sq mi)
Flag of Tajikistan		Tajikistan Republic of Tajikistan	Tajik: Тоҷикистон – Ҷумҳурии Тоҷикистон (Tojikiston – Jumhurii Tojikiston)	Dushanbe Tajik: Душанбе (Dushanbe)	9,750,064	143,100 km^{2} (55,251 sq mi)
Flag of Turkey		Turkey Republic of Turkey	Turkish: Türkiye – Türkiye Cumhuriyeti	Ankara Turkish: Ankara	84,775,404	783,562 km^{2} (302,535 sq mi)
Flag of Turkmenistan		Turkmenistan	Turkmen: Türkmenistan	Ashgabat Turkmen: Aşgabat	6,341,855	488,100 km^{2} (188,456 sq mi)
Flag of the United Arab Emirates		United Arab Emirates	Arabic: اﻹﻣﺎرات – دولة الإمارات العربية المتحدة (Al Imārāt – Al Imārāt al 'Arabīyah al Muttaḩidah)	Abu Dhabi Arabic: أبوظبي (Abu Dhabi)	9,365,145	83,600 km^{2} (32,278 sq mi)
Flag of Uzbekistan		Uzbekistan Republic of Uzbekistan	Uzbek: O‘zbekiston – O‘zbekiston Respublikasi	Tashkent Uzbek: Toshkent	34,081,449	447,400 km^{2} (172,742 sq mi)

Supporting Countries

- Australia
- Canada
- Denmark
- Egypt
- France
- Finland
- Germany
- Iraq
- Italy
- Japan
- Norway
- Poland
- Spain
- Sweden
- United Kingdom
- United States

Supporting Organizations

- AKDN
- CAREC
- CICA
- SAARC
- CSTO
- ECO
- NATO
- OIC
- OSCE
- SCO
- EU

== The Heart of Asia Region ==
The geographical area covering the 15 Participating Countries of the HoA-IP is defined as the Heart of Asia Region. It is one of the biggest regions in the world with a collective geographical area of more than 40 million km^{2} covering around 27% of the land area of the Earth. ABOUT HEART OF ASIA - ISTANBUL PROCESS

== Areas of cooperation in the Heart of Asia – Istanbul Process ==
The Heart of Asia – Istanbul Process is based on three main areas of cooperation: Political Consultations, Confidence Building Measures, and Cooperation with Regional Organizations.

=== Political consultations ===
Political consultations are an important step towards building confidence and generating regional consensus and coherence. This is an intrinsic ingredient of regional cooperation to bring the HoA-IP Participating Countries and stakeholders together around a set of common regional interests and to foster understanding. An Increase in coherent regional political consultations has the potential to strengthen genuine cooperation in the Heart of Asia Region. The Process has identified regional political consultation as its primary element to bring Afghanistan, its near and extended neighbors around the table. In fact, the Process has generated a new momentum of regional cooperation in the Heart of Asia Region and has made progress in creating a sense of interconnectedness between the region and Afghanistan. Most of political obstacles and barriers in the implementation of major regional economic projects, are addressed through this mechanism by finding common grounds that could ensure mutual interests of the Heart of Asia Region, as well as explore new opportunities and areas of cooperation.

=== Confidence Building Measures (CBMs) and lead countries ===
Regional cooperation requires the identification of areas of common interests. The Heart of Asia – Istanbul Process has the following eight different CBMs (one under development) in which one or more than one Participating Country/ies of the Process has/have the lead: 1. Counter Terrorism (CT): Led by Afghanistan, Turkey and [the United Arab Emirates]. 2. Counter Narcotics (CN): Led by [Azerbaijan] and [Russia]. 3. Disaster Management and Environmental Protection (DM&EP): Led by Kazakhstan and Pakistan. In the Eighth Ministerial Conference of the HoA-IP held in Istanbul 2019, it was decided to include the new theme of Environmental Protection to this CBM and rename it to Disaster Management and Environmental Protection CBM. The co-chairs for the year 2020 were mandated to amend the Implementation Plan for this new CBM, which is under development at the moment. 4. Culture and Education (CE): Led by Iran. 5. Regional Infrastructure (RI): Led by [Azerbaijan] and [Turkmenistan]. 6. Trade, Commerce and Investment Opportunities (TCIO): Led by [India]. 7. Agriculture Development (AD): Led by Pakistan and [Uzbekistan]. Approved in [Azerbaijan] 2017 and endorsed in Istanbul 2019. 8. Women Empowerment (WE): The Foreign Ministers of the Participating Countries approved in [Istanbul] 2019 to establish a new CBM of Women Empowerment. The co-chairs for the year 2020 were mandated to develop an Implementation Plan for this new CBM, which is under development at the moment. These CBMs promote regional dialogue and cooperation within the Heart of Asia Region. Each CBM has one or more lead country/ies that coordinate/s the activities and keep/s track of the progress made in each of these areas. Each CBM also has a desk within the Directorate General for Regional Cooperation of the Ministry of Foreign Affairs of Afghanistan and designated persons acting as focal points to follow up with the lead country as well as other Participating Countries along with Supporting Countries and Organizations.

=== Cooperation with regional organizations ===
For enhancement of current efforts in the region, the Heart of Asia – Istanbul Process works in close cooperation with Regional Processes and Organizations in order to create synergy between the Regional Organizations, supplement each other's efforts and avoid duplicity through promoting complementarity.

==== Implementation Plans (IPs) of the Confidence Building Measures (CBMs) ====
Each CBM of the Process has an Implementation Plan (IP), which outlines the priority areas and projects under that specific CBM where the Participating Countries could further enhance regional cooperation by implementing those priority areas and projects. Countries and organizations can voluntarily participate and support the implementation of these priority areas and projects.

== Decision making bodies of the Process ==
The Heart of Asia – Istanbul Process consists of four main decision making authorities: the Ministerial Conferences (MCs) the highest level, the Senior Officials Meetings (SOMs), Ambassadorial Meetings (AMs), and Regional Technical Groups (RTGs) Meetings.

=== Ministerial Conferences (MCs) ===
Ministerial Conferences take place on an annual basis. The MC, inaugurated by the Presidents of Afghanistan and the host nation for the year, is a platform where the Foreign Ministers, high level representatives and delegations of the Participating and Supporting Countries along with Supporting Regional and International Organizations come together to exchange ideas on the progress of the Heart of Asia – Istanbul Process during the year and discuss ways to tackle challenges that still lie-ahead. The participants of the Ministerial Conference continue their deliberations throughout the day of the conference. By delivering their statements of support, all parties reaffirm their commitments to the Process during the MC. Further, the co-chair and host of the next MC is officially announced. Another important outcome of the MC is the annual Declaration of the HoA-IP that is developed by the Senior Officials of the Participating Countries, prior to the MC. Each Declaration highlights a set of priorities that all Participating Countries agree to follow in the year ahead. These priorities include areas for fostering dialogue, special initiatives and the emphasis on the timely implementation of the CBMs. Following Eight Ministerial Conferences of the Heart of Asia – Istanbul Process have been held so far:

- a. 2 November 2011: Istanbul, Turkey
- b. 14 June 2012: Kabul, Afghanistan
- c. 26 April 2013: Almaty, Kazakhstan
- d. 31 October 2014: Beijing, China
- e. 9 December 2015: Islamabad, Pakistan
- f. 4 December 2016: Amritsar, India
- g. 1 December 2017: Baku, Azerbaijan
- h. 9 December 2019: Istanbul, Turkey

Based on the Istanbul Declaration of 2019, the Republic of Tajikistan is supposed to hold the ninth Ministerial Conference of the Heart of Asia – Istanbul Process in 2020.

== Senior Officials Meetings (SOMs) ==
Senior Official Meetings are held as deemed necessary. Usually, three to four SOMs take place each year. The first SOM of the year sets the theme. The other two SOMs are held to continue political consultations, review the progress of the CBMs and to finalize the Ministerial Declaration. Political consultations on regional issues within the Heart of Asia Region takes place during SOMs. SOMs directly influence and shape the discourse and agenda of the MC, and have decision-making authority. SOMs also serve as an important platform, where [Participating Countries], [Supporting Countries] and Regional and [International Organizations] engage with one another.

== Ambassadorial Meetings (AMs) ==
Ambassadorial Meetings (AMs) are mostly held in Kabul. They are held on an ad hoc basis, as the Permanent Chair, Afghanistan, deems necessary. They serve as an initial consultation to highlight a set of issues that are either of particular significance or require urgent attention. AMs are held in order to have an initial discussion with the Participating Countries before taking on the issue to the Senior Officials level. AMs are also held to do some initial work on behalf of Senior Officials on a particular issue dealing with any of the CBMs.

== Regional Technical Group Meetings (RTGs) ==
At the Regional Technical Group Meetings, technical delegates or experts of the HoA Region come together to discuss important measures needed for the successful implementation of the CBMs. According to Article 25 of the Beijing Declaration 2014, the lead countries of the CBMs should convene at least two RTGs each year. One RTG Meeting is supposed to take place within two months of each MC and the second no later than four months prior to the following MC. At the first RTG Meeting of the year, the activities for the coming year are identified and prioritized. The second RTG Meeting of the year serves to review progress.

== Achievements of the Heart of Asia – Istanbul Process ==
Since its establishment, the Heart of Asia – Istanbul Process has demonstrated its ability to bolster consensus on the political, security and economic fronts amongst the HoA-IP Participating and Supporting Countries and Supporting Organizations. The element of political consultations, through the Ministerial Conferences, Senior Officials Meetings, and Ambassadorial Meetings, has been dynamic, inclusive, and productive. However, this element requires further invigoration to become more result-oriented by addressing the obstacles to the political, security and economic cooperation.

The thematic Confidence Building Measures are major areas that offer the potential to address some of the entrenched issues that Afghanistan and the Heart of Asia Region face. In order to eliminate these obstacles, there needs to be an effective implementation of all CBMs. Effective implementations require an understanding of the dynamics and purpose of each CBM, which is why the Ministry of Foreign Affairs of the Islamic Republic of Afghanistan recently (2019) revised the Implementation Plans of all seven CBMs. The new Implementation Plans are more focused towards specific activities that the lead countries of each CBM must carry out for better cooperation in the region. The Regional Technical Group Meetings aim to strengthen cooperation in each CBM's thematic area and work towards implementation of activities set in the Implementation Plans.

The process also aimed to coordinate with other regional organizations, act as a link between them, and avoid duplicating their work.

== Notes ==
1. Area and population figures given are for the whole state, including areas located outside of Asia. Azerbaijan, Georgia, Kazakhstan, Russia, and Turkey all contain territory in Europe. The border between Asia and Oceania is not clearly defined, and Indonesia and East Timor are sometimes placed in Oceania.
2. The area and population of states with separatist regions includes that of the separatist regions.
