= Afghan coup d'etat =

Several coup d'etats or similar events have occurred in Afghanistan since its modern foundation in 1919.

- Assassination of King Habibullāh Kalakāni in 1929, in which Kalakani was captured by Mohammed Nadir Shah's forces and hanged
- 1973 Afghan coup d'état, which ousted King Mohammed Zahir Shah and the monarchy and created a republic led by Mohammed Daoud Khan
- 1976 Afghan coup d'état, a coup plotted by Mir Ahmad Shah Rizwani that was foiled by Daoud Khan's government
- Saur Revolution of 1978, the violent coup or 'revolution' that ousted Daoud Khan and created a communist republic led by PDPA general secretary Nur Muhammad Taraki
- 1979 Assassination of Nur Muhammad Taraki, PDPA general secretary, in which Taraki was suffocated under the orders of fellow Khalq communist Hafizullah Amin, though this was covered up to the public
- Assassination of PDPA general secretary Amin in 1979, when the Soviet Union intervened and killed General Secretary Amin
- 1990 Afghan coup attempt, a failed coup attempted by hardline Khalqist Shahnawaz Tanai against President Mohammad Najibullah
- 2002 Afghan coup plot, a foiled coup by members of hardline Islamist Gulbuddin Hekmatyar's Hezbi Islami against Afghan Interim Administration leader Hamid Karzai, which included killing former Afghan king Mohammed Zahir Shah on his planned return to Afghanistan
- Fall of Kabul (2021), a coup d'état by the Taliban against the Islamic Republic of Afghanistan
