= War in Afghanistan =

Index of articles associated with the same name

War in Afghanistan, Afghan war, or Afghan civil war may refer to:

- Wars of Alexander the Great#Bactria (330 BC–327 BC), the conquest of Afghanistan by the Macedonian Empire
- Muslim conquests of Afghanistan, a series of campaigns in the 7th, 8th, 9th, and 10th centuries
- Mongol campaigns in Central Asia (1216–1222), the conquest of Afghanistan by the Mongol Empire
- Mughal conquests in Afghanistan (1526), the conquest by the Mughal Empire
- Afghan-Sikh Wars (1748–1837), intermittent wars between the Afghans and Sikhs
- Afghan Civil War (1793–1823), war of succession in the Durrani Empire
- Afghan Civil War (1863–1869), a civil war between Sher Ali Khan and Mohammad Afzal Khan's faction after the death of Dost Mohammad Khan
- Panjdeh incident (1885), an incursion into Afghanistan by the Russian Empire during the era of the "Great Game"
- Anglo−Afghan Wars, wars conducted by British India in Afghanistan 1839–1919)
  - First Anglo−Afghan War (1839–1842)
  - Second Anglo−Afghan War (1878–1880)
  - Third Anglo−Afghan War (1919)
- Afghan Civil War (1928–1929), revolts by the Shinwari and the Saqqawists; the Saqqawists take over Kabul for a 9-month period
- Red Army intervention in Afghanistan (1929), an invasion by the Soviet Union against the Saqqawists in support of the royalists
- 1973 Afghan coup d'état
- 1975 Panjshir Valley uprising
- Afghan coup d'état (1976)
- Saur Revolution (1978)
- Afghan conflict (1978–present)
  - Soviet–Afghan War (1979–1989)
  - Afghan Civil War (1989–1992)
  - Afghan Civil War (1992–1996)
  - Afghan Civil War (1996–2001)
  - War in Afghanistan (2001–2021)
    - United States invasion of Afghanistan
    - Taliban insurgency
  - Islamic State–Taliban conflict (2015–present)
  - Republican insurgency in Afghanistan (2021–present)
- Afghanistan–Pakistan border skirmishes (1947–present)
  - 2025 Afghanistan–Pakistan conflict
  - 2026 Afghanistan–Pakistan war
