= Faiz Mohammed (Afghan communist) =

Afghan military officer and politician (1939–1980)

Faiz Mohammed فیض محمد

Ministry of Borders and Tribal Affairs
- In office 11 January 1980 – 11 September 1980
- President: Babrak Karmal
- Chairman of the Council of Ministers: Sultan Ali Keshtmand
- In office 1975–?
- President: Mohammed Daoud Khan

Minister of Interior
- In office 1973–1975
- President: Mohammed Daoud Khan
- Succeeded by: Abdul Qadir Nuristani

Personal details
- Born: 1939 Waziristan, North-West Frontier Province, British India
- Died: 11 September 1980 (aged 40–41) Lake Tiga, Paktia Province, Afghanistan
- Manner of death: Assassination
- Party: People's Democratic Party of Afghanistan
- Awards: Hero of the Democratic Republic of Afghanistan; Order of the Sun of Liberty; Order of the Saur Revolution

Military service
- Allegiance: Democratic Republic of Afghanistan (1978–1980)
- Branch/service: Afghan Army; Afghan Commando Forces
- Years of service: 1961–1980
- Rank: Lieutenant Colonel
- Battles/wars: 1973 Afghan coup d'état; 1975 Panjshir Valley uprising; Soviet-Afghan War

Faiz Muhammad (1939–11 September 1980) was an Afghan military officer and politician. He served in several governmental posts in Afghanistan during the 1970s and early 1980s, serving as Minister of Interior from 1973 to 1975 and as Minister of Borders and Tribal Affairs In 1980, and also served as the Afghan ambassador to Indonesia and Iraq.

He was assassinated by Afghan mujahideen insurgents in September 1980, whilst he was partaking in a negotiation process with tribal leaders for a peaceful solution to the Soviet-Afghan War.

== Early life and military career ==
Faiz Muhammad was born in 1939 to an ethnic Pashtun family, belonging to the Mahsud tribe in South Waziristan, when it was part of British India. He would remain there with his family, witnessing the fall of British India and the subsequent partition of India and independence of the newly created country of Pakistan. Shortly after, he and his family moved to Afghanistan in the early 1950s. Faiz joined the Afghan Army in 1961 and graduated from the Kabul Military Lyceum of Khushal Khan the same year. In 1964, he graduated from the Infantry Faculty of the Kabul Military Academy, and trained as a paratrooper in the 1st Central Army Corps. He was then assigned to the newly formed 444th Commando Battalion of the Afghan Commando Forces.

Further details about his time in the Afghan Army as enlisted personnel is scarce, but upon graduating in 1964, he was already a lieutenant. In the span of five years, he made his way up the ranks and was promoted to captain, previously being a Senior Lieutenant in 1966. Faiz would spend two years in a special training course for airborne officers in the Soviet Union, from 1969 to 1970. As a result of all the knowledge he gained from being under the tutelage of officers in the Soviet Airborne Forces, he was eligible to hold the post of head of the Operation Department of one of the elite 444th Commando Paratrooper Battalion. Simultaneously with his service in the army, he was also a member of a secret armed group known as the Revolutionary Democratic Organization, linked to the Parcham faction of the People's Democratic Party of Afghanistan (PDPA).

== Political career ==
=== Role in the 1973 coup ===
Faiz Muhammad was a participant of the 1973 Afghan coup d'état that resulted in the overthrow of the Afghan monarchy and the rise of Mohammad Daoud Khan to power. Faiz stormed the royal palace (Arg Residential Palace) along with other commandos of the 444th Commando Battalion such as General Khushal Peroz. For leading the commando battalion during the coup into the Arg Presidential Palace and Kabul International Airport, Faiz was promoted to Major and a year later, he became a Lieutenant Colonel after passing the rank of Senior Captain.

=== Role in Daoud Khan's government ===
Following the 1973 coup, he became a member of the country's highest authority – the Central Committee of the Republic of Afghanistan headed by President Daoud Khan. At the same time, he also served as the Minister of Interior, overseeing an investigation into military personnel accused of being involved in the death of Prime Minister Mohammed Hashim Maiwandwal. As the new Minister of Interior, Faiz attempted to create resentment among tribal leaders outside of the country’s urban areas and intellectuals in urban areas such as Kabul. Prior to Abdul Qadir Nuristani replacing him as the Minister of Interior, Faiz intentionally appointed many twelfth-grade graduates (who were in the PDPA, therefore being unacceptable to tribal leaders and rural chieftains) to create resentment among older people, more specifically tribal leaders.

According to the official report, Maiwandwal committed suicide while being imprisoned although it was widely believed he was tortured to death by Parchamites who had control of the Ministry of Interior as he was a staunch anti-leftist, therefore a threat to the PDPA. In December 1973, Faiz's investigation would lead to those accused being given long term prison sentences with some being sentenced to death. According to another account, President Daoud Khan planned to appoint Mohammad Hashim Maiwandwal as the Prime Minister of Afghanistan, leading to Faiz Mohammad, along with other Parchamites, framing Maiwandwal in a coup plot, then torturing him to death without Daoud Khan's knowledge.

After Maiwandwal's death, Daoud Khan began removing leftists from his cabinet, worsening of relations between left-wing officers and Daoud Khan, as well as the National Revolutionary Party of Afghanistan. This led to Faiz being moved to a politically less significant post of Minister of the Borders in 1975, convening in relations with the Pashtun tribes as a Pashtun himself. In 1977, he was appointed as the Afghan ambassador to Indonesia.

=== Career during the Democratic Republic of Afghanistan ===
The worsening relations between leftists and the republican government ultimately resulted in the Saur Revolution where communist military officers overthrew the autocratic government of Daoud Khan and established the Marxist–Leninist Democratic Republic of Afghanistan in 1978. In contrast to Faiz gaining various new positions after the 1973 Republican coup d’état, the PDPA's Khalq faction-aligned government only appointed him as the Afghan ambassador to Iraq.

Due to Soviet intervention in Afghanistan, President Hafizullah Amin was assassinated and Babrak Karmal was appointed as the new president of Afghanistan, replacing the Khalq faction with a Parcham-dominated government. Under Karmal's administration, Faiz became a member of the Central Committee of the PDPA and the Revolutionary Council of Afghanistan and on January 11, 1980, he became the Minister of Border Affairs. In his role, he led the process of establishing relations with Pashtun tribal leaders who had a negative attitude towards the regime due to the Marxist policies of the Khalq government and its draconian practices of torturing dissidents. As a former minister of the government, Faiz enjoyed authority among a number of tribal leaders with whom he personally negotiated loyalty to the PDPA authorities.

== Death ==
In September 1980, Faiz Muhammad and two escorts were in Paktia Province, where they participated in a negotiation process with the leaders of the Pashtun Jadran tribe. On September 11, all three were killed by mujahideen fighters led by Jalaluddin Haqqani, who belonged to the Islamic Party of Afghanistan (Yunus Khalis), in their sleep. He was the only minister of the PDPA government who died during the performance of his duties at the hands of Mujahideen, who violated the Pashtun tradition of respect for the guest. It is speculated that Faiz Mohammed was killed in response to the physical destruction by the PDPA government of prominent religious leaders of the country in 1979, but Faiz himself could not be involved, as he was involved in diplomatically easing opposition to the government.

== Awards ==
- The title Hero of the Democratic Republic of Afghanistan with the award of the "Golden Star" medal and Order of the Saur Revolution (1986, posthumously).

== Bibliography ==
- Афганистан. Краткий биографический справочник. М., 2004.
- Коргун В. Г. История Афганистана. М., 2004. С. 379—380 (О «деле Майвандваля»
