= Ghulam Haidar Rasuli =

Afghan military officer (1919–1978)

Ghulam Haidar Rasuli غلام حیدر رسولی
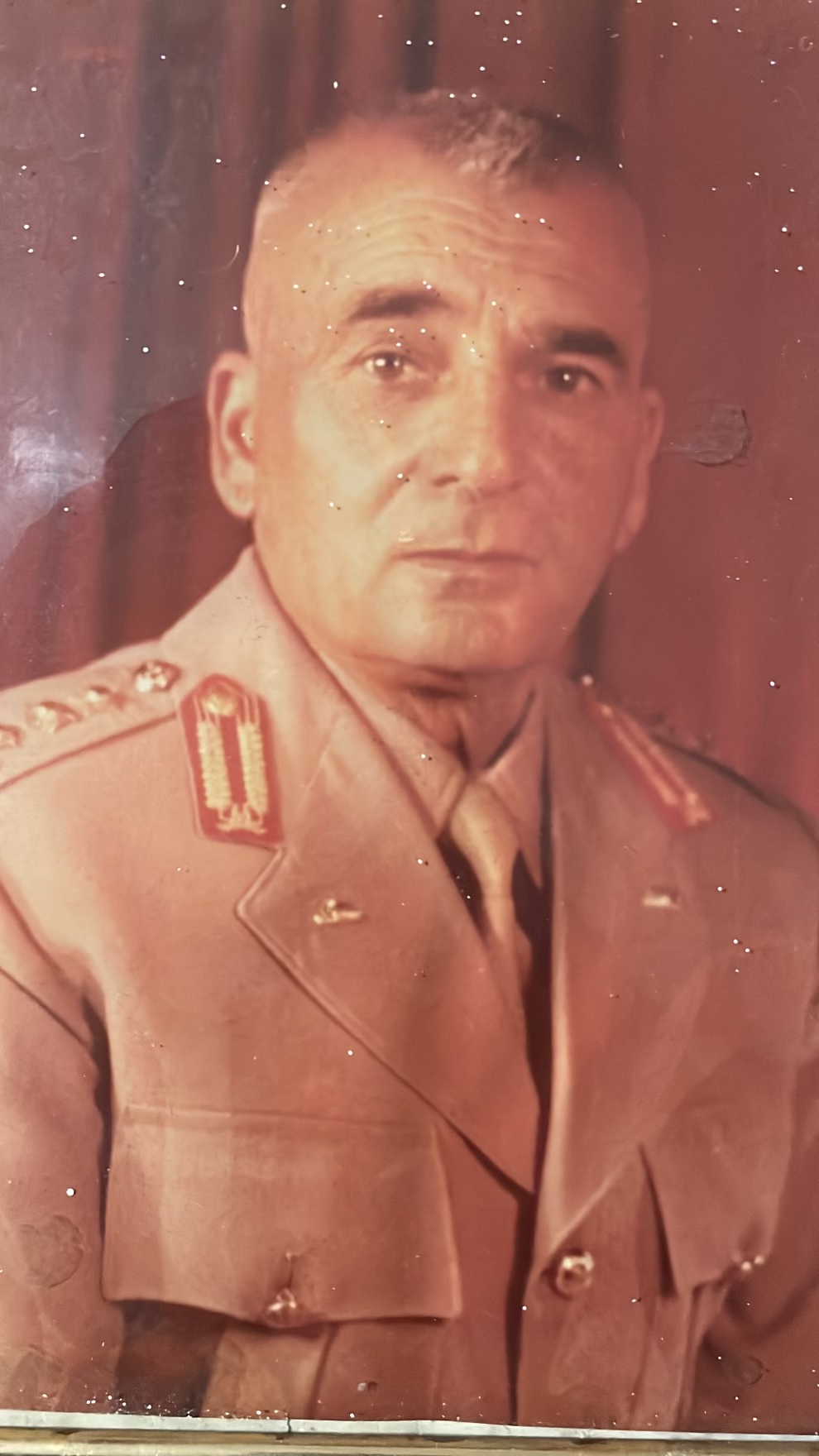

Minister of Defense of Afghanistan
- In office 7 November 1977 – 28 April 1978
- President: Mohammed Daoud Khan
- Preceded by: Abdul Karim Mustaghni
- Succeeded by: Abdul Qadir

Chief of General Staff
- In office 1975 – April 1978
- Succeeded by: Mohammad Aslam Watanjar

Personal details
- Born: 1919 Rostaq, Takhar Province, Emirate of Afghanistan
- Died: 28 April 1978 (age 57‐58) Kabul, Democratic Republic of Afghanistan
- Occupation: Politician, military officer

Military service
- Allegiance: Kingdom of Afghanistan (1933–1973); Republic of Afghanistan (1973–1978)
- Years of service: 1933–1978
- Rank: Major General
- Commands: Central Forces of Afghanistan; Chief of General Staff
- Battles/wars: Afghan tribal revolts of 1944–1947; Afghanistan–Pakistan border skirmishes; Bajaur Campaign; 1973 Afghan coup d'état; 1975 Panjshir Valley uprising; Saur Revolution (executed)

Ghulam Haidar Rasuli (Pashto: غلام حیدر رسولي) (1919 – 28 April 1978) was an Afghan military officer, who from 1977 to 1978, served as the Minister of Defense of Afghanistan.

== Early life and military career ==
Rasuli was born in 1919 in Rostaq, Takhar province, the son of Ghulam Rasul, an ethnic Muhammadzai Pashtun from Kandahar. His received his early education at the Military High School, graduating in 1933, before receiving military training in India. He then occupied a number of military posts in Afghanistan: in charge of the cavalry at Kabul from 1946 to 1954; in Jalalabad from 1954 to 1956; and serving as chief of staff at Mazar-i-Sharif from 1958 to 1960, at Pul-i-Khumri from 1960 to 1964, and at Gardez from 1964 to 1966. He finally became a Lieutenant colonel and Director of Recruitment in the Ministry of National Defense in 1966. He backed Daoud Khan while in retirement and was active in organizing political support for him, even convincing General Mohammad Nabi Azimi to become involved in the 1973 Afghan coup d'état. He was brought back to active service in 1973 after the coup that ousted King Mohammed Zahir Shah.

In 1966, Rasuli became the director of recruitment in the Ministry of National Defense. He was placed in charge of the Central Forces of Afghanistan in 1973 and became Chief of General Staff two years later. Additionally, Rasuli was also in the Central Committee of the National Revolutionary Party of Afghanistan.

He was appointed Minister of Defense of Afghanistan on 7 November 1977, but was killed on 28 April during the 1978 Saur Revolution. Rasuli's appointment to the Minister of Defense by Daoud Khan, after the 1973 coup d'état, would cause resentment among other high-ranking and educated military officers.

== Role in the Saur Revolution ==
On the morning of 27 April 1978, Rasuli ordered official celebrations to take place in army garrisons after the arrests of "atheist" PDPA members with a dangerous disregard for the possible reactions of leftists within the Afghan Army. Commanders encouraged troops to sing and dance, while the coup plotters used it to their advantage. Throughout the day, scattered actions occurred between the loyal and rebel forces as the rebels took over the Ministry of Interior, Communications, and Foreign Affairs. General Ghulam Haidar Rasuli, the Chief of Staff of the Afghan Army, attempted to rally the loyal units. He found out that most of the units and their commanders were sitting on the fence, waiting to find out who would win. Detachments from the loyal 7th Division of Rishkhor moved into Kabul from the south and engaged the rebels. In the early afternoon, the 'rebel' MiGs and Su-7 strike fighter aircraft from Bagram Air Base made their rounds at the palace. The presidential guards who fought intensely against the rebels did not have the capacity to fend against bombardments from artillery, tanks and planes. Earlier in the day, Daoud had ordered the loyal air units at Shindand Air Base, 500 miles west of Kabul, to assist him. They arrived early in the afternoon, but when they arrived, they had only 10 minutes of flying time before having to return to Shindand.

On the 6th of Sowr, I personally informed Rasuli of the tendentious activities taking place within the army, led by Hafizullah Amin, and requested him not to give the 4th Armoured Forces permission to come out of the division on the 7th of Sowr. But Rasuli did not accept it. He did not accept my request for summoning the units, but he teasingly reassured and advised me to calm down. At 10:00 as well, I informed Rasuli that despite his instruction, the tanks were moving along towards Kabul city centre. The Defence Minister Hayder Rassuli replied: "I am aware of it and the preparations will be carried out."

— The Ministry of Defense's Chief of Intelligence General Nissar Khan

Rasuli finally arrived in Rishkhor, late at night, as he attempted to get the 7th Infantry Division involved in the defense against the revolutionaries. In reality, Rasuli's attempts were futile as none of the soldiers on the defending side were prepared for aerial bombardments being conducted by revolutionaries within the Afghan Air Force, more specifically Abdul Qadir.
