= 1977 Afghan Constitutional Assembly election =

- 1977

Constitutional Assembly elections were held in Afghanistan in January 1977. The Constitutional Assembly was called to produce a new constitution four years after the coup that saw Mohammed Daoud Khan overthrow his cousin, King Mohammed Zahir Shah. The Assembly was part-elected and part-appointed.

== Background ==
In 1973 Daoud Khan deposed his brother-in-law, Zahir Shah in a bloodless coup. The parliament democratically elected in 1969 was dissolved. Daoud went on to turn the country into a presidential republic with the National Revolutionary Party, founded in 1975, as the sole legal party.

A 41-member Constitutional Committee was formed to draft a new constitution, which would be scrutinised and approved by an elected Assembly.

The constitution drawn up provided for a unicameral parliament named the National Council (Melli Jirga). Only the National Revolutionary Party would be able to nominate candidates for parliamentary elections. The president was to be elected for a six-year term by two-thirds vote in a Loya Jirga consisting of the parliament, National Revolutionary Party central council members, government ministers, Supreme Court judges, members of the Armed forces, 30 presidential nominees and 5–8 representatives from each province.

== Electoral system ==
The 219 elected members were elected in a traditional manner; public meetings were held in each district, with voting taking the form of shows of hands or shouts until one candidate became the clear favourite.

== Results ==
The 219 elected members including four women; Kubra Noorzai (the first female minister in 1965), Aziza Amani, Najiba and Najiba Siir. Together with the eight appointed female members, women made up 15% of the Assembly.

== Aftermath ==
The Assembly convened in February and approved the new constitution, as well as unanimously electing Daoud as president. It was then dissolved. Daoud was overthrown in the Saur Revolution the following year and no elections were held under the new constitution.
