= Mir Akbar Khyber =

Afghan politician and leftist intellectual (1925–1978)

- مير اکبر خيبر

Editor of the Parcham
- In office 1968–1969

Personal details
- Born: 11 January 1925 Logar, Afghanistan
- Died: 17 April 1978 (aged 53) Kabul, Afghanistan
- Party: People's Democratic Party of Afghanistan

Mir Akbar Khyber (Note: Pashto: مير اکبر خيبر) (Note: Sometimes spelled Khaibar) (January 11, 1925 – April 17, 1978) was an Afghan left-wing intellectual and a leader of the Parcham faction of People's Democratic Party of Afghanistan (PDPA). His assassination by an unidentified person or people led to the overthrow of Mohammed Daoud Khan's republic, and to the advent of a socialist regime in Afghanistan, the Democratic Republic of Afghanistan.

== Early life and education ==
He was born on March 11, 1925, in Logar Province. Khyber graduated from Harbi Pohantoon Military University in 1947, in use by the Royal Afghan Army.

== Career ==
Khyber was increasingly active among opposition groups to King Mohammad Zahir Shah’s government. In 1950, he was imprisoned for his revolutionary activities and supposed opposition towards Islam. Later he was employed by the Ministry of Education, until he was expelled from Paktia for taking part in an anti-government riot in 1965. After returning to Kabul, he became editor of the Parcham newspaper, Parcham, and oversaw a clandestine effort to recruit soldiers of Afghan Army into the Parcham faction, additionally targeting the Afghan Commando Forces. He was a close confidant of the Parcham leader Babrak Karmal.

== Assassination ==
Nur Muhammad Taraki and Babrak Karmal standing at the location Khyber was assassinated in Kabul.

He was assassinated outside his home on 17 April 1978. The Daoud regime attempted to blame Khyber's death on Gulbuddin Hekmatyar's Hezbi Islami, but Nur Mohammad Taraki of the PDPA held the government responsible, a belief that was shared by much of the Kabul intelligentsia. Louis Dupree, an American historian and specialist of Afghanistan, concluded that interior minister Abdul Qadir Nuristani, a virulent anti-communist, had ordered the killing. However, several sources, including fellow Parchamites Babrak Karmal and Anahita Ratebzad, claimed that Hafizullah Amin, a leader of the rival Khalq faction, was the instigator of the assassination. Some former ministers of Khalq faction claim that the assassination was ordered by the Soviet Union and Karmal. Daoud's confidant, Abdul Samad Ghaus, suggested that a strong rivalry existed between Amin and Khyber as they both attempted to infiltrate the military for their respective factions. Also, Khyber's attempts to reunite Khalq and Parcham cells within the military would have undermined Amin's power, according to communist sources. Ghaus suggests that Amin's henchmen, Siddiq Alamyar and his brother (Sadeq Alamyar, who would later be directly involved in the Kerala massacre), were responsible for assassination of both Khyber and Inamulhaq Gran (mistakenly thought to be Karmal) upon order from Amin. Alamyar became Amin's minister of planning and his brother became the president of the general transportation authority. At the time, there was also a theory that the CIA was involved in Khyber's death.

Communist PDPA members at the funeral of Khyber in Kabul, front row left to right: Anahita Ratebzad, Dr. Shah Wali, Sulaiman Layeq, Babrak Karmal, Nur Muhammad Taraki and Mohammad Najibullah.

At Khyber's funeral on April 19, some 15,000 PDPA sympathizers gathered in Kabul, and paraded through the streets chanting slogans against the CIA and the SAVAK, the Shah of Iran's secret police. Alarmed by this demonstration of communist strength, Daoud ordered a crackdown on the PDPA leadership, which in turn prompted the PDPA to launch a military coup that became known as the Saur Revolution, during which Daoud was killed, and the PDPA took power.
