= Soviet-occupied Afghanistan =

Soviet-occupied Afghanistan may refer to:

- Democratic Republic of Afghanistan (1978–1987)
- Soviet–Afghan War (1979–1989)
- Soviet invasion of Afghanistan (1979)

== See also ==
- Afghan Civil War (1989–1992)
- Afghan Civil War (1992–1996)
- Afghan Civil War (1996–2001)
- Afghanistan conflict (1978–present)
- Republic of Afghanistan (1987–1992)
- Saur Revolution (1978)
- United States invasion of Afghanistan (2001)
- War in Afghanistan (disambiguation)
