= Abdul Karim Mustaghni =

Afghan politician

- عبدالکریم مستغنی
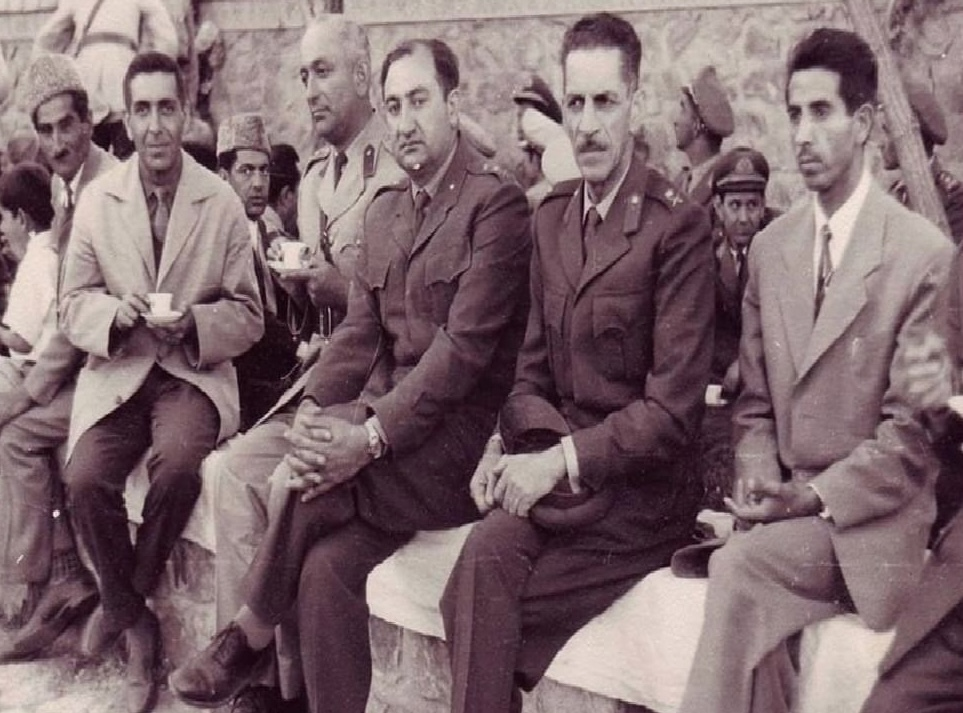
- Abdul Karim Mustaghni holding his tea on the left

Minister of Defence of Afghanistan
- In office 1973–1977
- President: Mohammed Daoud Khan
- Preceded by: Mohammed Daoud Khan
- Succeeded by: Ghulam Haidar Rasuli

Personal details
- Born: July 11, 1911 Emirate of Afghanistan
- Died: January 13, 2004 (aged 92) Islamic Republic of Afghanistan
- Occupation: Scientist, Politician and Military Officer

Military service
- Allegiance: Kingdom of Afghanistan; Republic of Afghanistan
- Rank: Major General
- Battles/wars: 1975 Panjshir Valley uprising

Abdul Karim Mustaghni (Dari: عبدالکریم مستغنی, July 11, 1911 – January 13, 2004) was an Afghan scientist, military officer and politician. Mustaghni was Defense Minister of Afghanistan from 1973 to 1977. Mustaghni assisted Mohammed Daoud Khan in the 1973 bloodless coup against the monarchy of Mohammed Zahir Shah. Zahir and his ministers were aware of a possible coup plot, but Mustaghni, fully aware of the plans, misled them into believing that the coup would occur months later, allowing the coup to occur while Zahir and several of his key ministers were out of country.

Mustaghni was the son of Afghan poet Abdul Ali Mustaghni.
