= Abdul Ali Mustaghni =

Afghan poet (1875–1933)

Abdul Ali Mustaghni (1875–1933) was an Afghan poet. He is one of the most influential poets in modern Persian literature. He was named as the "founder of Pashto modern literature of the country" by President Hamid Karzai.

Abdul Karim Mustaghni, who assisted Mohammed Daoud Khan in the 1973 coup d'état against Mohammed Zahir Shah, was Abdul Ali Mustaghni's son.
