= Abdul Qadir Nuristani =

Afghan politician and police chief

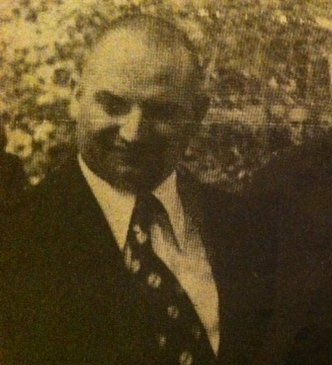
- Abdul Qadir Nuristani

Minister of Interior
- In office 1 December 1975 – 28 April 1978
- President: Mohammed Daoud Khan
- Preceded by: Faiz Mohammed

Personal details
- Born: 7 July 1936 Kabul, Kingdom of Afghanistan
- Died: 28 April 1978 (aged 41) Kabul, Democratic Republic of Afghanistan
- Manner of death: Assassination

Military service
- Allegiance: Republic of Afghanistan
- Branch/service: Afghan National Police
- Rank: Colonel

Abdul Qadir Nuristani (Dari: عبدالقادر نورستانی; 7 July 1936 – 29 April 1978) was an Afghan politician and police chief who served as Afghanistan's interior minister during the presidency of Mohammad Daoud Khan.

Nuristani had previously served as Chief of Police noted for his strict adherence to his principles and beliefs. He replaced minister Faiz Mohammad, a purged PDPA member, in September 1975.

During his tenure as interior minister, Nuristani served as a close advisor to Daoud Khan and played a key role in shaping the country's economic and political policies. He worked to improve relations with other countries and to attract foreign investment to Afghanistan. In addition to his work in industry and politics, Nuristani was also known for his efforts to promote education and development in Afghanistan. He worked to improve access to education, particularly for girls and women, and to support economic development in the country. Despite their efforts, Nuristani and Daoud Khan faced significant challenges in their efforts to stabilize Afghanistan.

Despite the challenges of the time, Nuristani's role in Daoud Khan's government in the 1970s had a lasting impact on Afghanistan. His efforts to promote education and development laid the foundation for the country's future progress, and he remains an important figure in Afghan history.

Nuristani was assassinated on 29 April 1978 in the Saur Revolution, being accused of the assassination of Mir Akbar Khyber beforehand.
