= 1975 Panjshir Valley uprising =

Iranian–Pakistani backed uprising in Afghanistan

- Part of Afghanistan–Pakistan border conflicts
Date	Late July 1975
Location	Panjshir Valley, Parwan Province Afghanistan (modern-day Panjshir Province)
Result	Afghan government victory; Uprising suppressed successfully; Jamiat-e Islami commanders flee to Pakistan; End of the 1975 rebels in Afghanistan

Belligerents
Afghanistan	Islamic rebels; Jamiat-e Islami; Pakistan; ISI

Commanders and leaders
(Republic of Afghanistan (1973–1978)) Mohammad Daoud Khan (Republic of Afghanistan (1973–1978)) Abdul Karim Mustaghni (Republic of Afghanistan (1973–1978)) Faiz Mohammed (Republic of Afghanistan (1973–1978)) Ghulam Haidar Rasuli (Republic of Afghanistan (1973–1978)) Mohammad Aslam Watanjar	Burhanuddin Rabbani; Ahmad Shah Massoud; Gulbuddin Hekmatyar (Pakistan) Zulfikar Ali Bhutto (Pakistan) Ghulam Jilani Khan (Pakistan) Naseerullah Khan Babar

Units involved
Afghan Army; Republican Guard Brigade; Afghan Commando Forces; 444th Commando Battalion; Afghan Air Force; 373rd Air Transport Regiment; Panjshiri locals	Afghan guerrilla troops

Strength
Unknown	5,000+

Casualties and losses
Light	Heavy

The 1975 Panjshir Valley uprising (Pashto: ۱۴۵۴ د پنجشېر د درې پاڅون, Dari: شورش دره پنجشیر ۱۳۵۴) was part of a larger conservative Tajik uprising led by Jamiat-e Islami against the government of Daoud Khan, and was the first ever ISI operation that took place in Afghanistan. It was in "retaliation to Afghanistan’s proxy war and support to the militants against Pakistan".

The Republic of Afghanistan support to anti-Pakistani militants had forced then-Prime Minister of Pakistan Zulfiqar Ali Bhutto and Naseerullah Khan Babar, then-Inspector General of the Frontier Corps in NWFP (now Khyber Pakhtunkhwa), to adopt a more aggressive approach towards Afghanistan. As a result, ISI, under the command of Major General Ghulam Jilani Khan set up a 5,000-strong Afghan guerrilla troop, which would include influential future leaders like Gulbuddin Hekmatyar, Burhanuddin Rabbani and Ahmad Shah Massoud, to target the Afghan government, the first large operation, in 1975, being the sponsoring of an armed rebellion in the Panjshir valley. The 1975 rebellion, though unsuccessful, shook Daoud Khan and made him realize that a friendly Pakistan was in his best interests. He started improving relations with Pakistan and made state visits there in 1976 and 1978. During the 1978 visit, he agreed to stop supporting anti-Pakistan militants and to expel any remaining militants in Afghanistan to the dismay of the Khalqists who would overthrow Daoud that same year in the Saur Revolution.

== Background ==
In 1973, former Prime Minister Mohammed Daoud Khan was brought to power in a coup d'état backed by the People's Democratic Party of Afghanistan, and the Republic of Afghanistan was established. These developments gave rise to an Islamist movement opposed to the increasing communist and Soviet influence over Afghanistan. During that time, while studying at Kabul University, Massoud became involved with the Muslim Youth (Sazman-i Jawanan-i Musulman), the student branch of the Jamiat-e Islami (Islamic Society), whose chairman then was the professor Burhanuddin Rabbani. Kabul University was a center for political debate and activism during that time.

== The uprising ==
Infuriated by the arrogance of his communist peers and Russian professors, a physical altercation between Massoud and his Russian professor led Massoud to walk out of the university, and shortly after, Kabul. Two days later, Massoud and a number of fellow militant students traveled to Pakistan where, goaded by another trainee of the Pakistani Inter-Services Intelligence (ISI), Gulbuddin Hekmatyar, Massoud agreed to take part in a coup against Daoud with his forces rising up in the Panjshir and Hekmatyar's elsewhere. In July 1975, Massoud, with help from the Pakistani intelligence, led the first rebellion of Panjshir residents against the government of Daoud Khan. While the uprising in the Panjshir began saw initial success, even taking the military garrison in Rokha, the promised support from Kabul never came and the rebellion was suppressed by the 444th Commando Battalion sending Massoud back into Pakistan (after a day hiding in Jangalak) where he would attend a secret, paramilitary ISI training center in Cherat. Dissatisfied, Massoud left the center and returned to Peshawar where he committed himself to personal military studies. Massoud read Mao Tse-Tung's writings on the Long March, of Che Guevara's career, the memoirs of General de Gaulle, General Võ Nguyên Giáp, Sun Tzu's Art of War, and an unnamed handbook on counterterrorism by an American general which Massoud called "the most instructive of all".

As part of the operation, smaller militant detachments were sent to the nearby areas of Laghman, Nangarhar and Badakhshan; these were unsuccessful. Fighters either faced defeat after the Afghan Commando Forces were sent to the three provinces to curb the uprising or were arrested upon arrival, with neither local nor army support. The Afghan Republican Army did not have to be called in to suppress any of the uprisings.

After this failure, a "profound and long-lasting schism" within the Islamic anti socialist movement began to emerge. The Islamic Society split between supporters of the more moderate forces around Massoud and Rabbani, who led the Jamiat-i Islami, and more radical Islamist elements surrounding Hekmatyar, who founded the Hezb-i Islami. The conflict reached such a point that Hekmatyar reportedly tried to kill Massoud, then 22 years old.

The 1975 rebellion, though unsuccessful, made Daoud Khan realize that a friendly Pakistan was in his best interests. He started improving relations with Pakistan and made state visits there in 1976 and 1978. During the 1978 visit, he agreed to stop supporting anti-Pakistan militants and to expel any remaining militants in Afghanistan.
