= Ali Ahmad Khurram =

Afghan politician (1931–1977)

Minister of Planning
- In office 1974 – 16 November 1977
- President: M.D Khan

Personal details
- Born: 1931 Kabul, Kingdom of Afghanistan
- Died: 16 November 1977 (aged 45–46) Kabul, Republic of Afghanistan
- Education: Kabul University; University of Pittsburgh
- Profession: Economist

Ali Ahmad Khurram (1931–16 November 1977) was an Afghan politician who was assassinated while serving as the minister of planning.

== Early life and education ==
Khurram was born in Kabul in 1931. He obtained a degree in economics from Kabul University in 1957. He received a MA from the University of Pittsburgh in 1965. He completed his post-graduate studies in the US in 1968.

== Career ==
Khurram joined the Ministry of Planning in 1956. After working in different capacities at the Ministry he was named as the deputy minister of planning in 1971. He was appointed minister of planning to the cabinet led by Prime Minister Mohammad Daoud Khan in 1974.

== Assassination ==
Khurram was assassinated in Kabul on 16 November 1977. The perpetrator was Mohammad Marjan, son of Ghulam Sakhi, son of Mohammad Shah, who hailed from Shega, Kuz Kunar, Nangarhar. He claimed that he killed Khurram for religious causes, but it was also speculated that the incident was carried out by the Khalq faction of the People's Democratic Party. Marjan was sentenced to life imprisonment and was later released from prison when a general amnesty was implemented.

At the time of assassination Prime Minister Mohammad Daoud Khan was changing the foreign policy and started relations with the Western countries and Arab countries. The Afghan government also planned that the relations with the Soviet Union, on the other hand, would be gradually decreased. These policy changes are regarded as the motives for the assassination of Khurram.
