= Rostaq, Afghanistan =

Rostaq (Persian: رستاق), also rendered as Rastagh, may refer to:

- Rostaq, Afghanistan (village), a village in Takhar Province, Afghanistan
- Rustaq District, Afghanistan, a district in Takhar Province, Afghanistan
