= Abdul Samad Ghaus =

Afghan politician

Deputy Foreign Minister
- In office 1977–1978

Personal details
- Born: 1928 Kabul, Afghanistan
- Died: 2008?
- Party: Republic of Afghanistan

Abdul Samad Ghaus (1928 – 2008?) was a deputy foreign minister of Afghanistan in Mohammed Daoud Khan's Republic of Afghanistan. He was the most senior official of the Afghan Foreign Ministry to survive the communist coup in April 1978. After house arrest, he was imprisoned in 1980. He came to United States in 1981 and authored The Fall of Afghanistan: An Insider's Account in 1988, where he recounts detailed events leading to the assassination of President Mohammed Daoud Khan and the fall of the Republic of Afghanistan.

Ghaus was born in Kabul. He completed high school in Kabul, and continued his education in France and Switzerland, graduating from University of Geneva in 1956 with equivalent of MA in political science and international affairs. He was appointed as chair of the 25th session of the UN Special Political Committee in 1970, and served as director of United Nations and International Conferences Department of political affairs in 1973, director general of political affairs in 1976 and finally deputy foreign minister in 1977. He was intimately involved in all major aspects of the Afghan foreign policy, including top-level talks with the Soviet Union, United States and Pakistan. His friendship with Theodore L. Eliot Jr., United States Ambassador to Afghanistan in 1973, helped secure funding to publish the book on Afghanistan.
