= Sayyid Abdulillah =

Afghan politician (1945–1978)

- سید عبدالله

Vice President of Afghanistan
- President: Mohammad Daoud Khan

Minister of Finance
- President: Mohammad Daoud Khan

Personal details
- Born: 1945 Kingdom of Afghanistan
- Died: 29 April 1978 (aged 32–33) Kabul, Democratic Republic of Afghanistan
- Cause of death: Assassination
- Party: National Revolutionary Party
- Occupation: Politician

Military service
- Battles/wars: 1976 Afghan coup d'état attempt Saur Revolution †

Sayyid Abdulillah was an Afghan politician in Mohammad Daoud Khan administration as vice president, deputy prime minister and minister of finance.

He was born in 1945, educated in Afghanistan and obtained bachelor's degree in economics from Kabul University in 1970.

He served as Daoud's Vice President of Afghanistan (19 February 1978 - 29 April 1978) and Minister of Finance (March 1977 - April 1978). He was appointed to Vice President's office and Finance minister office by Mohammed Daoud Khan. He was Second Deputy Prime Minister from 1975 to 1978. He was also assassinated with Mohammed Daoud Khan on 29 April 1978.

Sayyid Abdulillah was a son of Sayyid Abdullah (He was born in 1923 in Farah, a former deputy of Wolesi Jirga from Shindand.).
