= Haqiqat-e Inquilab-e Saur =

Afghan daily newspaper

- Founded: 1978; 47 years ago
- Country: Afghanistan

Haqiqat-e Inquilab-e Saur (Dari: حقيقت انقلاب ثور, 'Truth of the Saur Revolution') was a daily newspaper in Afghanistan. It was owned by the central committee of the People's Democratic Party of Afghanistan.

In the mid-1980s, it had a circulation of 50,000 and was the main print medium in the country. It was named after Afghanistan's Saur Revolution. The paper reported largely on economic and political developments of the non-aligned bloc countries, as well the countries of the socialist Eastern bloc.
