= National Revolutionary Party of Afghanistan =

National Revolutionary Party حزب انقلاب ملی ملي انقلابي ګوند
- Leader: Mohammad Daoud Khan
- Governing body: Central Committee
- Founded: 1974
- Dissolved: 1978
- Headquarters: Kabul
- Ideology: Pashtun Irredentism; Republicanism; Progressivism; Secularism; Authoritarianism; Anti-communism
- Political position: Syncretic
- Colors: Gold

The National Revolutionary Party (NRP; Dari: حزب انقلاب ملی, romanized: Hezb Enqilab Mili; Pashto: ملي انقلابي ګوند, romanized: Melli Enqelabi Gund), or National Revolution Party, was a political party in Afghanistan. The party was founded in 1974 by President Mohammad Daoud Khan, who had seized control of Afghanistan from his first cousin, King Mohammad Zahir Shah, in the mostly bloodless 1973 coup d'état.

The party was formed in an attempt by Daoud to garner support and grassroots backing for his republican regime. Daoud also intended the party to undermine support for the People's Democratic Party of Afghanistan (PDPA), who had actually helped him come to power in 1973. To this end, the party sought to be an umbrella organization for all of the factions of the progressive movement in Afghanistan. In order to help the party in its attempt to garner support, all other political parties were banned. Despite the party being anti-communist, Daoud demanded that members of the PDPA join the National Revolutionary Party and called for the dissolution of the Khalq and Parcham factions.

The party did not survive the Saur Revolution in April 1978, which saw the overthrow and death of Daoud and his family, and the rise to power of the communist Khalqists belonging to the PDPA.

== Standing Committee ==
The party was run by a central committee that was designated as the highest organ of the party:

- Major General Ghulam Haidar Rasuli
- Defense Minister Sayyid Abd Ullah
- Finance Minister Abd Ul Majid
- Professor Abd Ul Quyyum

== See also ==
- Republic of Afghanistan
- Democratic Republic of Afghanistan
