= Rostaq, Afghanistan (village) =

Rostaq رستاق
- Village
- Location within Afghanistan
- Coordinates: 37°08′N 69°50′E
- Country: Afghanistan
- Province: Takhar
- District: Rustaq District, Afghanistan

Rostaq (Dari: رستاق) is a village in Takhar Province, in northeastern Afghanistan, near the Tajikistan border. It is the district center of Rustaq District.

== Climate ==
Rostaq has a hot-summer Mediterranean climate (Köppen climate classification Csa).

Climate data for Rustaq
Month	Jan	Feb	Mar	Apr	May	Jun	Jul	Aug	Sep	Oct	Nov	Dec	Year
Mean daily maximum °C (°F)	5.2 (41.4)	7.2 (45.0)	12.7 (54.9)	18.4 (65.1)	23.6 (74.5)	31.1 (88.0)	33.5 (92.3)	33.1 (91.6)	28.1 (82.6)	21.1 (70.0)	13.5 (56.3)	7.6 (45.7)	19.6 (67.3)
Mean daily minimum °C (°F)	−5 (23)	−2.8 (27.0)	2.1 (35.8)	6.9 (44.4)	9.9 (49.8)	14.3 (57.7)	16.6 (61.9)	15.4 (59.7)	10.3 (50.5)	6.1 (43.0)	1.0 (33.8)	−2.6 (27.3)	6.0 (42.8)
Average precipitation mm (inches)	49 (1.9)	87 (3.4)	113 (4.4)	115 (4.5)	86 (3.4)	6 (0.2)	5 (0.2)	1 (0.0)	1 (0.0)	24 (0.9)	36 (1.4)	48 (1.9)	571 (22.5)
Source: Climate data
