= The Kabul Times Daily =

State-run English-language newspaper in Afghanistan

- Type: Daily newspaper
- Format: Broadsheet
- Owner: Government of the Islamic Emirate of Afghanistan
- Founder: Sabahudin Kuskkaki
- Publisher: Azadi Print House
- Editor-in-chief: Nik Mohammad Nikmal
- Founded: 1962
- Language: English
- Headquarters: Azadi Print House, 620 Eighth Avenue, Kabul, Afghanistan
- Country: Afghanistan
- Website: thekabultimes.com

The Kabul Times Daily (Dari: روزنامه کابل تایمز; Pashto: کابل ټایمز ورځپاڼه) is a state-run English-language newspaper in Afghanistan, initially established on February 27, 1962, as The Kabul Times. As of 2018, it had a daily circulation of 47,000 and was offered in both print and online formats.

Following the 1978 Saur Revolution, The Kabul Times was renamed Kabul New Times and began to print Communist rhetoric that was reminiscent of days during the Cold War and was highly confrontational towards Western culture.

The paper briefly stopped publication during the October 2001 US-led invasion, resuming in March 2002. Following the 2021 fall of Kabul to the Taliban, the editor-in-chief Hamidullah Arefi resigned; after a brief period of vacancy, Nik Mohammad Nikmal was appointed as the new editor and the paper was renamed The Kabul Times Daily.

== See also ==
- Mass media in Afghanistan
