= Mir Ahmad Shah Rizwani =

Afghan military general and Islamist intellectual

- Died: c. 1978
- Military career
- Rank: General
- Known for: 1976 Afghan coup d'etat attempt

Mir Ahmad Shah Rizwani (d. 1978) was an Afghan military general and Islamist intellectual who led an attempted coup d'etat against the Afghan government in December 1976 and was later executed after the 1978 communist takeover of the country. Due to his prominence and influence as a scholar, he had been brought into the government fold and given the title of Firqa Meshir, chief of the army. Rizwani was a follower of Islamic scholar Muhammad Atta-ullah Faizani, and headed his own Islamist group, mainly composed of army personnel, called Qiyam-i Islami (Islamic Uprising), which plotted an abortive coup against the government of President Mohammad Daoud Khan. The coup was preempted; Rizwani and 50 of his associates (such as Sayyid Ismail Pasikh and Akhtar Mohammad Sulaimankhel) were arrested on December 9, 1976, and Rizwani executed in 1978 following the communist takeover. His associates who survived fled to Pakistan.
