= Republic of Afghanistan (1973–1978) =

Afghan state from 1973 to 1978

Republic of Afghanistan: د افغانستان جمهوريت (Pashto); Dǝ Afġānistān Jumhūriyat; جمهورى افغانستان (Dari); Jumhūrī-yi Afğānistān
- 1973–1978
- Flag (1974–1978) Emblem (1974–1978)
- Anthem: څو چې دا ځمكه آسمان وي (Pashto); Śo ce dā źməka āsmān wi Tso che daa dzmuka aasmaan wee "So long as there is Earth and Heaven"
- Capital: Kabul; 33°N 65°E
- Common languages: Pashto, Dari
- Religion: Islam
- Demonym: Afghan
- Government: Unitary one-party presidential republic under a dictatorship
- President
  - 1973–1978: Mohammad Daoud Khan
- Vice President
  - 1973–1978: Sayyid Abdulillah
- Legislature: Loya Jirga (National Assembly)
- Historical era: Cold War
  - Coup d'état: 17 July 1973
  - 1975 Panjshir Valley uprising: Late July 1975
  - Saur Revolution: 27–28 April 1978
  - Establishment of the Democratic Republic of Afghanistan: 30 April 1978
- Currency: Afghani
- Calling code: +93
- ISO 3166 code: AF
Preceded by	Succeeded by
Kingdom of Afghanistan	Democratic Republic of Afghanistan

The Republic of Afghanistan (Pashto: د افغانستان جمهوریت, Dǝ Afġānistān Jumhūriyat; Dari: جمهوری افغانستان, Jumhūrī-yi Afğānistān), was the first republic in Afghanistan. It is often called the Daoud Republic, as it was established in July 1973 by General Sardar Mohammad Daoud Khan of the Barakzai dynasty (alongside senior Barakzai princes) who deposed his cousin, King Mohammad Zahir Shah, in a coup d'état. The occasion for the coup was the 1964 Constitution of Afghanistan which took power from most members of the royal family in favour of centralization under Zahir Shah and his offspring under the tenet of democracy. Daoud Khan was known for his autocracy and attempts to modernize the country with help from both the Soviet Union and the United States, among others.

The Republic of Afghanistan was also under a unitary and centralised form of government during the time.

In 1978, a military coup known as the Saur Revolution took place, instigated by the communist People's Democratic Party of Afghanistan, in which Daoud and his family were killed. The "Daoud Republic" was subsequently succeeded by the Soviet-backed Democratic Republic of Afghanistan.

== History ==
=== Formation ===
In July 1973, while King Mohammad Zahir Shah, the reigning Afghan monarch at the time, was in Italy undergoing eye surgery as well as therapy for lumbago, his cousin and brother-in-law, General Sardar Mohammad Daoud Khan, the former prime minister, staged a coup d'état in Kabul. This coup overthrew the Kingdom of Afghanistan and established the Republic of Afghanistan in its place, which was a single-party state. General Daoud had been forced to resign as prime minister by King Zahir a decade earlier. The King abdicated the following month rather than risk an all-out civil war.

=== Single party rule ===
After seizing power, Daoud Khan, who had himself proclaimed as the first President of Afghanistan, established his own political party, the National Revolutionary Party. This party became the sole focus of political activity in the country. In 1974, the new flag of Afghanistan was introduced, as well its emblem, with a flag raising ceremony being held outside of the Arg presidential palace. In January 1977, a loya jirga was convened following the Constitutional Assembly election, and approved a new constitution establishing a presidential one-party state, with political opposition being suppressed, sometimes violently.

Also in 1973, Mohammad Hashim Maiwandwal, a former prime minister, was accused of plotting a coup, though it is unclear if the plan was actually targeting the new republican government or the abolished monarchy. Maiwandwal was arrested and allegedly committed suicide in jail before his trial, but widespread belief says he was tortured to death.

=== Rise of communism ===
After General Daoud's 1973 establishment of the Republic of Afghanistan, members of the People's Democratic Party (PDPA) were given positions in the government. In 1976, President Daoud established a seven-year economic plan for the country. He started military training programs with India and Egypt, commenced economic development talks with Iran. Daoud also turned his attention to oil rich Middle Eastern nations such as Saudi Arabia, Iraq, and Kuwait among others for financial assistance.

During Daoud's presidency, relations with the Soviet Union deteriorated. They saw his shift to a more Western-friendly leadership as dangerous, including Daoud's criticism of Cuba's membership in the Non-Aligned Movement and Daoud's expulsion of Soviet military and economic advisers. The suppression of political opposition furthermore turned the Soviet-backed PDPA, an important ally in the 1973 coup against the King, against him.

Daoud in 1978 had achieved little of what he had set out to accomplish. The Afghan economy had not made any real progress and the Afghan standard of living had not risen. Daoud had also garnered much criticism for his single party constitution in 1977 which alienated him from his political supporters. In March 1978, Daoud visited Islamabad and agreed to stop supporting rebel groups in Pakistan, as well as agreeing to expel Pakistani militants in the future. He additionally made plans for Afghan military personnel to be trained by the Pakistan Armed Forces.

When Afghans by 1978 had grown disappointed with the "do nothing" Daoud government, the PDPA government officials alone were identified by some with economic and social reform. By this time, the two main factions of the PDPA, previously locked in a power struggle, had reached a fragile agreement for reconciliation. Communist-sympathizing army officials were by then already planning a move against the government. According to Hafizullah Amin, who became Afghan head of state in 1979, the PDPA had started plotting the coup in 1976, two years before it materialized.

=== Saur Revolution ===
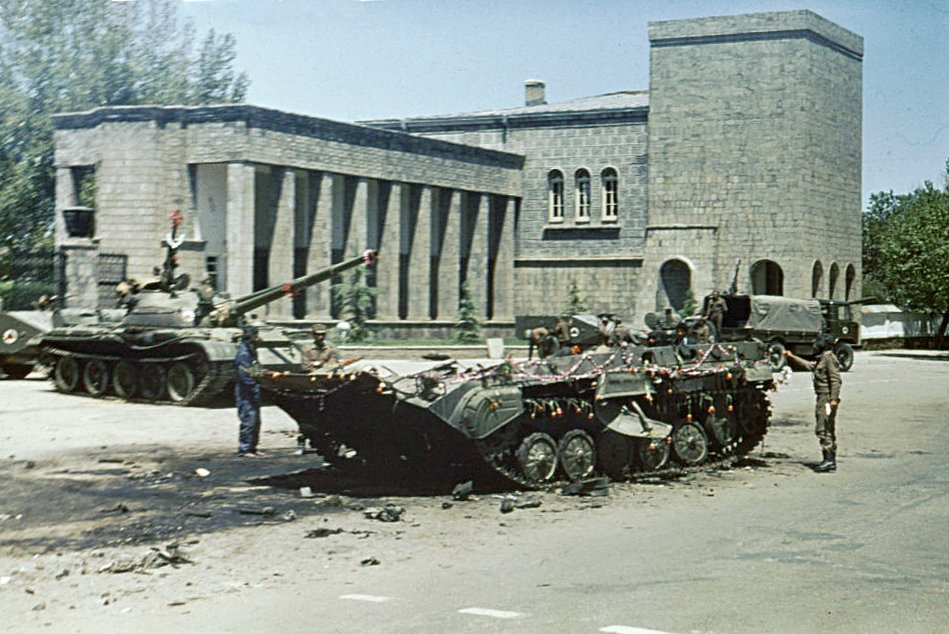
The day after the Saur Revolution in Kabul.

The PDPA seized power in a brutal military coup in 1978, which is best known as the Saur Revolution. On 27 April, troops from the military base at Kabul International Airport started to move towards the center of the capital. It took only 24 hours to consolidate power, with the rapid push including an air raid on the Arg (the Presidential palace), and insurgent army units quickly seized critical institutions and communication lines. The deposed Daoud and most of his family were executed the following day.

Nur Muhammad Taraki, General Secretary of the PDPA, was proclaimed Chairman of the Presidium of the Revolutionary Council and effectively succeeded Mohammed Daoud Khan as head of state. He simultaneously became head of government of the newly established Democratic Republic of Afghanistan.

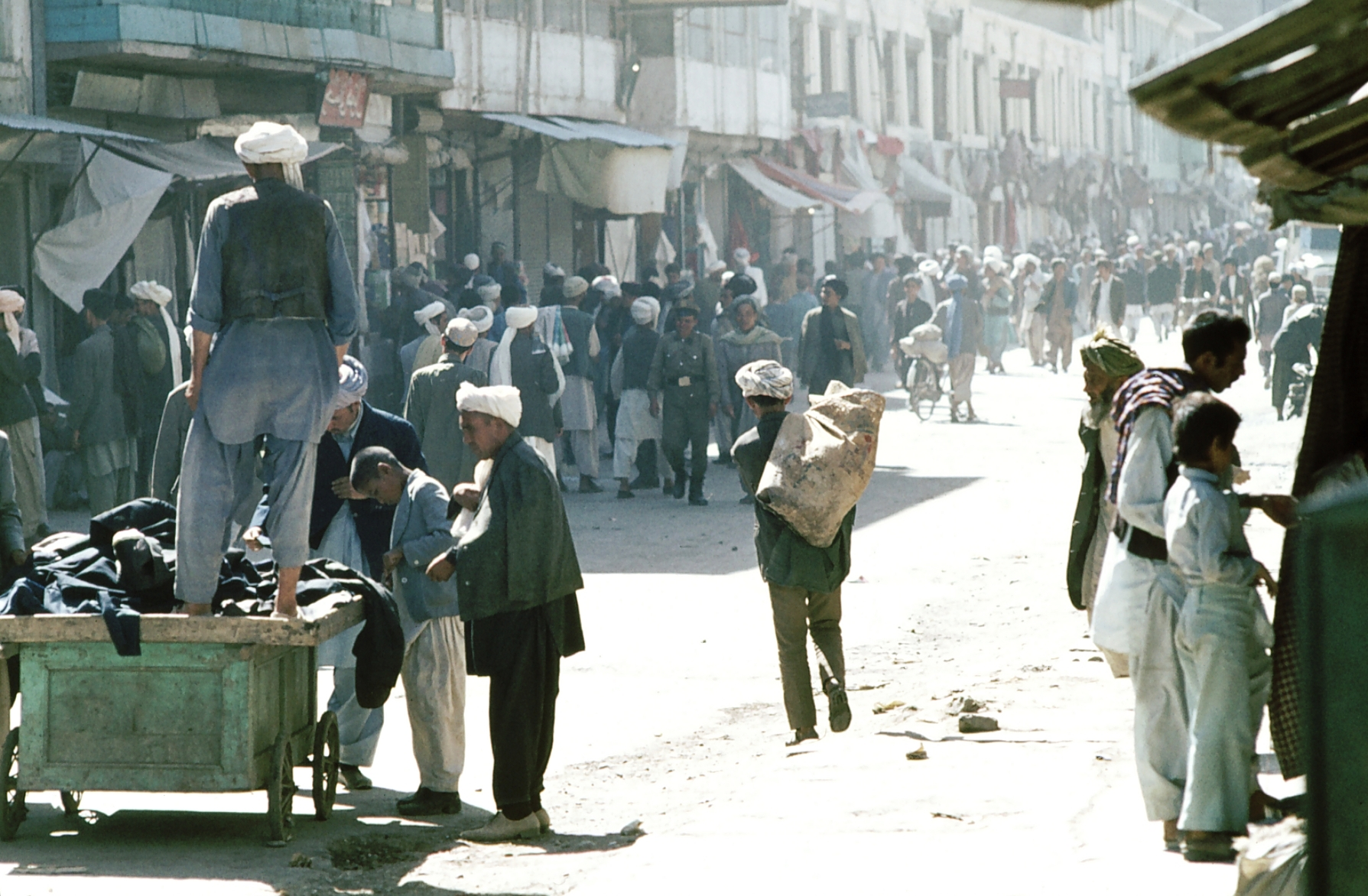
Everyday street life in Kabul, 1977

== Politics ==
Daoud Khan pursued the policy of bi-tarafi, meaning "without sides", during the Cold War. He sought investments from the Soviet Union and the United States. Secularists supported Daoud as he was in favour of letting the Islamic veil (and more specifically the purdah) remain optional for Afghan women, however, extremists would harass women who chose not to veil themselves, even resorting to throwing acid on exposed legs.

=== Amelioration of Afghan–Pakistani relations ===
After the 1975 Panjshir Valley uprising, a failed Iranian–Pakistani (SAVAK and the ISI) backed rebellion which sought to oust the Republican government using Jamiat-e Islami, Daoud realised a friendlier Pakistan was in his best interests, therefore he was in support of resolving the border dispute with Pakistan and balancing Afghanistan's ties with the Soviet Union by expanding relations with the West and reaching out to Muslim nations such as Iran, Saudi Arabia, Iraq, Kuwait, Egypt and others for financial assistance.

During Daoud Khan's meeting with Prime Minister Zulfikar Ali Bhutto in June 1976, Daoud indicated that there were countries (in reference to the Soviet Union) “that did not want to see the amelioration of Afghan–Pakistani relations. It was imperative that those quarters be denied the satisfaction of witnessing the worsening of relations between Afghanistan and Pakistan”. After Daoud Khan's other visit in August 1976, relations between the two countries improved and transit trade benefited significantly, with India's surplus crop being allowed to be transported over land from India to Afghanistan. Consequently, both Bhutto and Daoud were close to reaching an agreement on the recognition of the Durand Line in return for Pakistan granting autonomy to the North-West Frontier Province (NWFP) and Balochistan. This did not come to fruition due to Zia ul-Haq’s military coup in June 1977 which ended Bhutto’s government, and Daoud being killed a year after during the Saur Revolution in April 1978.

== Military ==
A few days after the coup, the former Royal Afghan Army under Zahir Shah was now being referred to as the Afghan Republican Army under Daoud Khan in The Kabul Times newspaper.

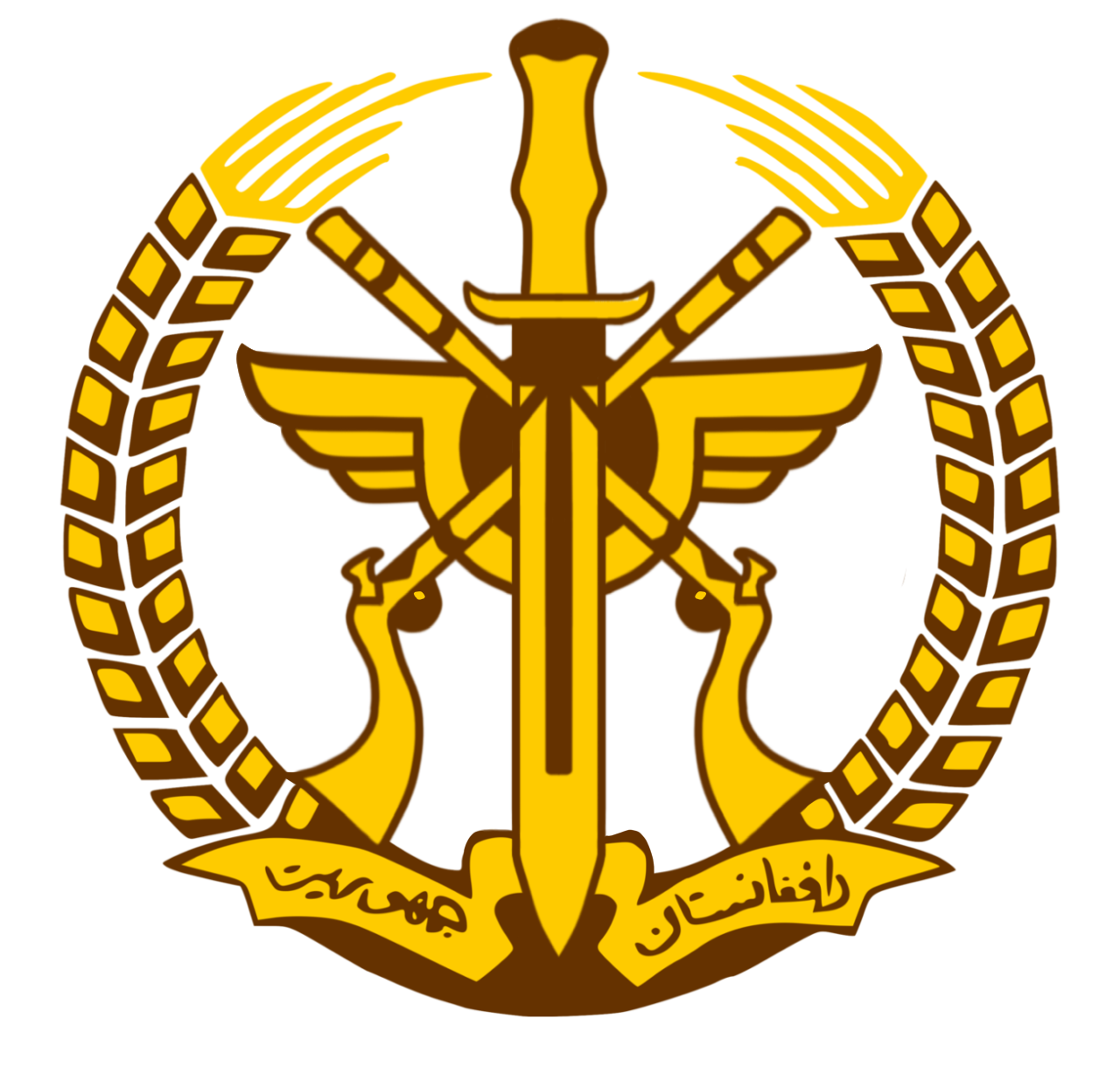
The Ministry of Defense emblem of the Republic of Afghanistan

A 1973 United States Department of State report stated that there was a problem of allegiances within the Afghan military, describing the issue: “The population in general regards the armed forces as an instrument of government, rather than an organisation of citizens in service of the nation. The individual normally respects authority, but this respect is shown first and foremost to his own tribal chief or head of family”. By the end of the 1970s, the Afghan Air Force had over 180 aircraft, consisting of Mikoyan-Gurevich MiG-17, Mikoyan-Gurevich MiG-19 and Mikoyan-Gurevich MiG-21 fighters, Sukhoi Su-7BM strike fighters and Ilyushin Il-28 bombers.

Daoud Khan made intensive efforts to cultivate closer military ties to India as a means to avoid total reliance on Soviet training and supply. By November 1974, Afghanistan began a massive military build-up along the Durand Line, with a promise of more Soviet military support including infantry gear, radar systems, 1,170 tanks (such as the T-62, T-54, and T-55, and bridge-laying tanks), over 6,000 pieces of artillery (including 500 each of SAM-7 and SAM-2 missiles), transport vehicles, infantry equipment, radars, 40 MiG-21s and 40 MiG-17 aircraft, and 50 combat helicopters. 270 officers departed for training in the Soviet Union, while another 250 were sent to India.

Under Daoud, the Afghan Republican Army additionally grew in size, from 13 infantry divisions to 16. Each of the 3 army corps were reinforced with a mechanised brigade and tank battalion. Along the Jalalabad–Khyber Pass front, the Afghan Republican Army's presence was strengthened. Previously, there had only been one mountain brigade and a single infantry division, until they were reinforced with an infantry division that had its own tank battalion, along with an additional mountain brigade, two more tank battalions, and an infantry brigade. This was in the efforts to form a “Jalalabad Corps”, planned to consist of two infantry divisions, one of them a mountain division, and an armoured division consisting of three tank battalions.

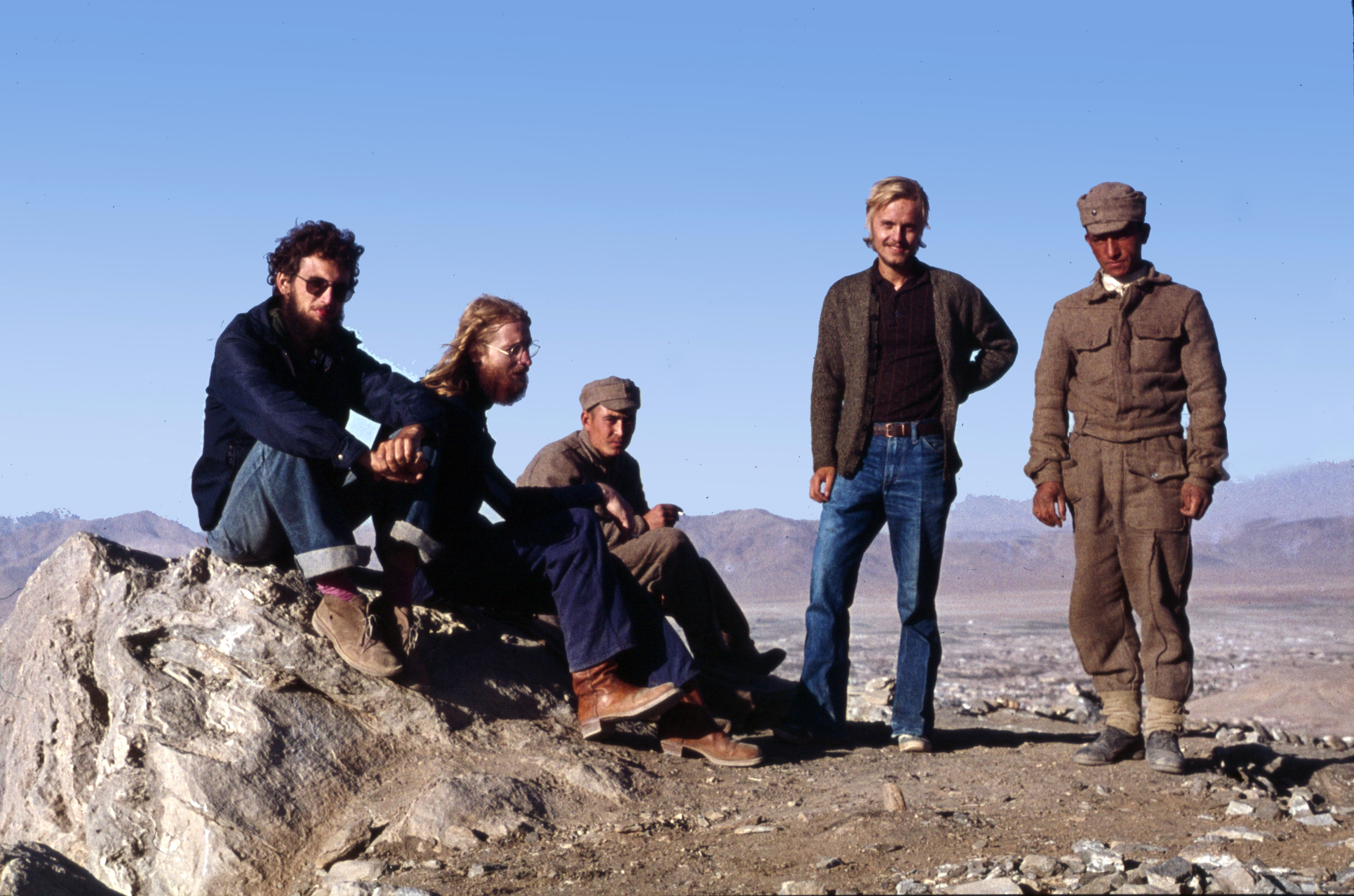
Western tourists posing with two Afghan soldiers in Kabul during a journey on the Hippie trail, 1976

In the Gardez–Matun area facing Bannu, the Afghan Army were also reinforced. A tank battalion and an armoured brigade were added to a sector that already contained two infantry divisions and one mountain brigade. In the province of Kandahar, the 7th Armoured Division was reorganised, with two tank battalions being removed and three new tank battalions taking their place with new armour. A mechanised brigade, artillery brigade, an anti-aircraft brigade, and another mountain brigade were added to forces of the 2nd Army Corps in Kandahar which already consisted of an infantry division, an armoured division, and a mountain brigade. Kandahar Airfield was activated and fully operational, hosting two squadrons of MiG-17 aircraft.

Starting in 1976, Daoud began to wean away from political and military dependence on the Soviet Union and formed a commission of senior Afghan military officials to review and change Soviet military manuals so they could accommodate Afghanistan's operational environment and national military traditions. The commission did not make any significant progress, but the exercise to modify manuals for all branches of the Afghan Armed Forces alerted the Soviets, which coincided with the temporary reunification of Parcham and the Khalq factions of the PDPA in the summer of 1976. The reunification of the two factions and the Soviet role in mediation worried Daoud, who saw the action as hostile to the Afghan Republic.

== Education ==
Daoud Khan heavily focused on education and women's rights during his reign. His government opened many schools and by the time of the Saur Revolution, 1 million Afghan students were enrolled in school, many whom were girls.
