= 1973 Afghan coup d'état =

Overthrow of King Mohammad Zahir Shah of Afghanistan

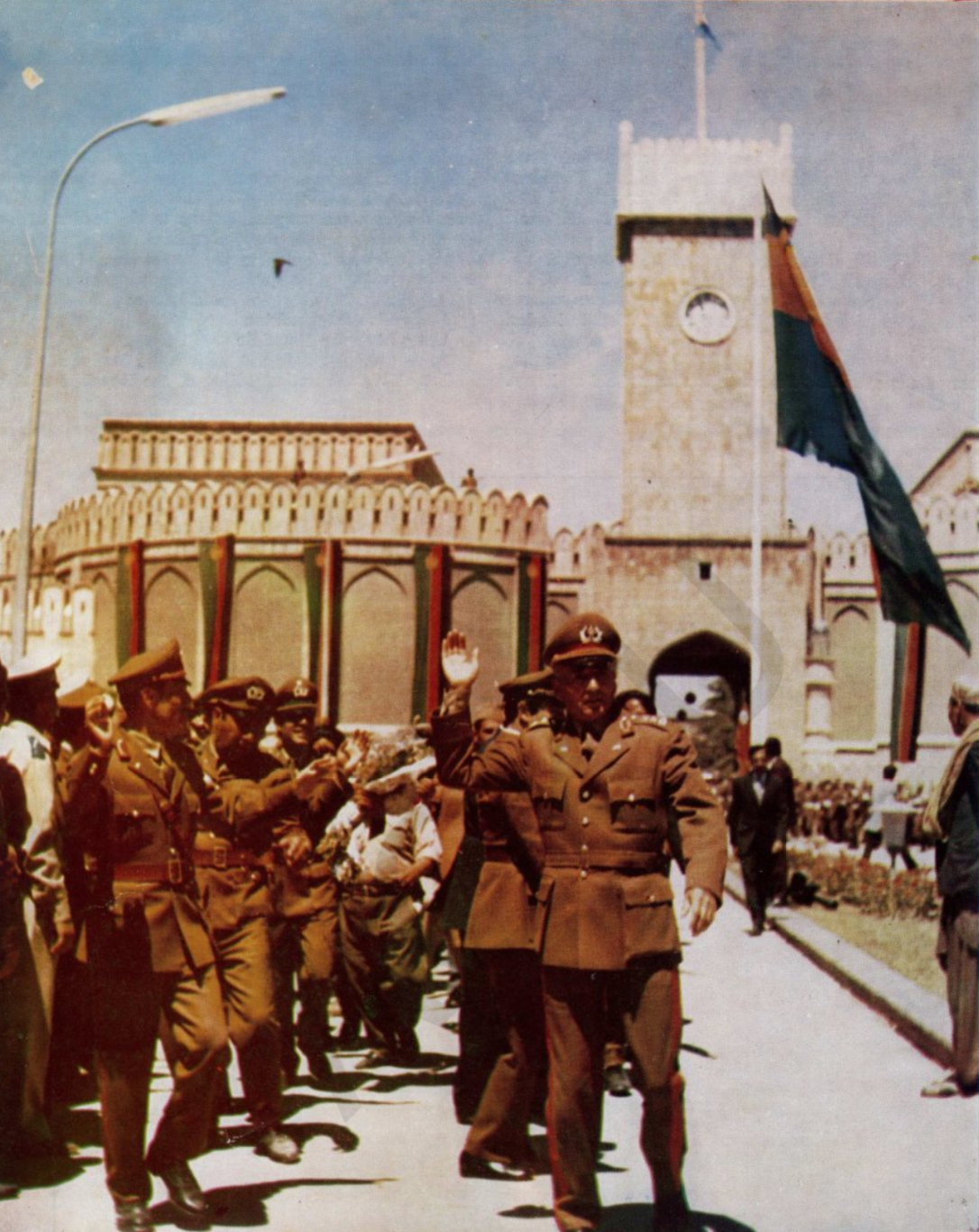
- Minister of Defense General Rasuli performing Attan with Afghan officers on the first anniversary of the coup
Date	17 July 1973
Location	Kabul, Kingdom of Afghanistan
Result	Coup attempt succeeds virtually bloodless

Belligerents
(Afghanistan) Republican officers PDPA	Kingdom of Afghanistan

Commanders and leaders
(Afghanistan) Mohammad Daoud Khan (Afghanistan) Abdul Karim Mustaghni (Afghanistan) Mohammad Zia Majid; Faiz Mohammed; Abdul Qadir	None

Units involved
Royal Afghan Army; Royal Guard Brigade; 4th Tank Brigade; 15th Tank Brigade; 717th Civil Disciplinary Unit; 88th Heavy Artillery Regiment; Afghan Commando Forces; 444th Commando Battalion; Royal Afghan Air Force	Royal Afghan Army; Royal Guard Brigade; 7th Infantry Division; 8th Infantry Division; Afghan Regional Gendarmerie

Strength
2,200 military personnel	

Casualties and losses
1 tank destroyed, 4 soldiers killed	7 policemen killed

The 1973 Afghan coup d'état, (Note: Pashto: د ۲۶ چنگاښ اوښتون, romanized: Də 26 Cungāx Awəṣ̌tun [d̪ə ʃpag.wiʃt̪ t͡ʃuŋ.gɑx ʔa.wəʂ.t̪un/ʔa.wəʃ.t̪un/ʔa.wəç.t̪un/ʔa.wəx.t̪un]; Dari: گودتای ۲۶ سرطان, romanized: Kōdatā-yi 26 Saratan [kʰoː.d̪ä.t̪ʰɑ́ː.jɪ ʃäst̪ ʔʊ d̪uː.jʊ́.mɪ/d̪ʊ.wʊ́.mɪ sä.ɾä.t̪ʰɑ́ːn]) locally known as the Coup of 26 Saratan, The National Revolution and self-proclaimed as the Revolution of 26 Saratan 1352, (Note: 26 Saratan 1352 refers to the day the coup took place in the Solar Hijri calendar, corresponding to 17 July 1973 in the Gregorian calendar. It may also be referred to as its Pashto language equivalent, 26 Čungāx̌ 1352 (د چنګاښ ۲٦-۱۳٥۲).) was led by Army General and prince Mohammad Daoud Khan against his cousin, King Mohammad Zahir Shah, on 17 July 1973, which resulted in the establishment of the Republic of Afghanistan under a one-party system led by Daoud Khan.

For the coup, Daoud Khan led forces in Kabul along with then-chief of staff General Abdul Karim Mustaghni, to overthrow the monarchy while the King was convalescing abroad in Ischia, Italy. Daoud Khan was assisted by army officers and civil servants from the Parcham faction of the PDPA, including Air Force colonel Abdul Qadir. Daoud also had the support of air force personnel stationed in Kabul International Airport and Bagram Air Base, led by Lieutenant Abdul Hamed Muhtaat and Lieutenant Pachagul Wadafar, although the flying of military aircraft over the city was not called upon. Seven loyalist police officers and one tank commander, as well as three members of his tank crew, were killed in what was described at the time by staff from the United States National Security Council as a "well planned and swiftly executed coup".

King Zahir Shah decided not to retaliate and he formally abdicated on 24 August, remaining in Italy in exile. More than two centuries of royal rule (since the founding of the Durrani Empire in 1747) ended with the coup. Daoud Khan would himself be overthrown and executed by the PDPA in the Saur Revolution of 1978. The coup itself would also kickstart decades of conflict and turmoil in Afghanistan.

== Background ==
Zahir Shah had ruled as king since 1933, and his cousin Prince Daoud Khan had served as Prime Minister from 1953 to 1963. Daoud Khan had strained relations with the King and he was also unable to hold political office after the 1964 constitution, which barred members of the Barakzai dynasty from being involved in politics. Some believe the King did this on purpose because of Daoud Khan's strong pro-Pashtunistan views, which he deemed too radical, and which had led to political rifts with Pakistan.

Daoud Khan took advantage of growing public discontent over the failure of reforms by five successive governments since a parliamentary monarchy was formed in 1964, including the King's failure to promulgate the Political Parties Law, Provincial Councils Law, and Municipal Councils Act, all of which had been passed by parliament. Another reason was the poor response to the famine in 1971–72 that is believed to have killed thousands in the central and north-western parts of the country, particularly Ghor Province, causing the resignation of Prime Minister Abdul Zahir's government. Around 1972, people were unhappy with the parliament's ineffectiveness and lack of leadership, leading to the growth of various political movements at universities. Daoud Khan's internal disputes with the King have also been cited as a possible reason of his decision to launch a coup. A possible involvement of the Soviet Union in the coup has also been debated.

In March 1973, a senior foreign ministry official, Wahid Abdullah, asked the United States Ambassador, Robert G. Neumann, in several conversations how Washington would react if Mohammed Daoud Khan returned to power. In April, Neumann told Wahid Abdullah that although Washington could not comment on Afghan domestic politics, the American attitude towards Afghanistan would be determined by its "policies and actions, in particular toward U.S. interests and towards peace and stability in the region". Neumann thus actually gave Daoud the green light, but in his reply he believed that Daoud would return via an appointment as prime minister. Neumann's superiors were skeptical of this scenario and suggested reminding Abdullah of U.S. support for the Afghan constitution if he resumed contact. Wahid Abdullah did not, however, approach U.S. diplomats afterward. No further U.S. contact with Daoud's camp preceded the coup.

== Coup ==
Zahir Shah left Afghanistan for London, via Rome, on the morning of June 25, 1973, for hemorrhaging treatment after injuring his eye. After treatment he went back to Italy spending time in the island of Ischia. The 444th Commando Battalion, including Faiz Mohammed and Khushal Peroz, took over the royal residence in the dead of night and Kabul International Airport. Daoud Khan, with several hundreds of his supporters from the army launched the coup on the morning of July 17; within hours and without any armed resistance, the monarchy ended and Khan announced the new republic through Radio Afghanistan at 7 in the morning. Staff from the United States National Security Council described it as a "well planned and swiftly executed coup."

Seven police officers died at a police station, who engaged the rebels, whom they considered a hostile force, Habibullah Khan Zurmatai, a tank commander of the Royal Afghan Army's 4th Armoured Brigade and his tank crew who all drowned in the Kabul River between Ibn Sina Hospital and Artal Bridge after swerving off the road, trying to avoid colliding with a bus. Habibullah Khan Zurmatai, along with his tank crew, were additional participants of the coup, leading the tanks of the Royal Afghan Guard. Other tanks that took part in the coup belonged to the Afghan Army's parachutist battalions.

== Aftermath ==
Despite being part of the Musahiban Barakzai dynasty, Daoud Khan abolished the monarchy and replaced it with a new republic instead, declaring himself as head of state and head of government, foreign minister and head of the Army. The royal Arg (palace) in Kabul became the official presidential residence. In a radio address, he called the coup a "national and progressive revolution", calling the King's rule "corrupt and effete" and vowed to replace it with "genuine democracy". He pledged to continue Afghanistan's long-standing policy of neutrality.

After the coup's success, residents of Kabul began placing flowers and wreathes onto the soldiers who participated in the coup, including tanks, rifles, armoured vehicles and cars. Children reportedly stood on top of the armoured vehicles used in the coup, alongside their crews and other soldiers. The coup participants were even offered free goods and products from shopkeepers in the city, and as for its citizens, cinemas provided free tickets while taxis and buses carried passengers to their destinations free of charge. Additionally, the upper class residents of Kabul celebrated the success of the coup with alcoholic beverages.

The Soviet Union and India diplomatically recognized the new government on July 19. On July 21, the government was recognized by West Germany, Mongolia, and Czechoslovakia.

I think all those compatriots most sincerely who have welcomed the establishment of the Republican regime throughout the country in the unprecedented and heartfelt manner and want to see me. It is my heartfelt desire to see all of them, but because of being very busy this possibility does not exist at present. I hope I will be able to see you all personally at a suitable time

— Excerpt from the New Kabul Times, July 21, 1973, words from Daoud Khan after the coup

Daoud Khan's links to Marxism, and the Parchamite support in his military coup, led to some suspecting it as being a communist takeover. In order to prevent opposition, he assured continuity of religious and cultural heritage, as demonstrated in the Republican Decrees created in July 1973. Upon coming to power, Daoud Khan disbanded the parliament and the judiciary, with direct executive rule established. Additionally, the Afghan Army was also referred to as the "Afghan Republican Army" in the 12th volume of a Kabul Times newspaper, published a few days after the coup. Despite his socialist views, Daoud did not bring drastic change to the economic system and maintained connections with the Cold War superpowers.

Only a month later, in July 1973, the Muslim Youth Organisation attempted to overthrow the Republican government. After failing, the group fled to Pakistan seeking sanctuary, where the Pakistani government accepted them and provided military training for Afghan exiles and their followers.

A loya jirga was convened following the Constitutional Assembly election in January 1977, and approved a new constitution creating a presidential one-party state, with strong powers to the head of state. Daoud started re-approaching the United States and Pakistan, which contributed to the deterioration of his relations with the Soviet Union and the PDPA communists. Eventually he was overthrown and killed during the Saur Revolution in 1978, including by several high-ranking civilian and military officials who helped him to obtain power in 1973.

== See also ==
- Saur Revolution
