= Mohammad Daoud Khan =

Afghan military officer and politician (1909–1978)

Sardar Mohammad Daoud Khan
- محمد داود خان
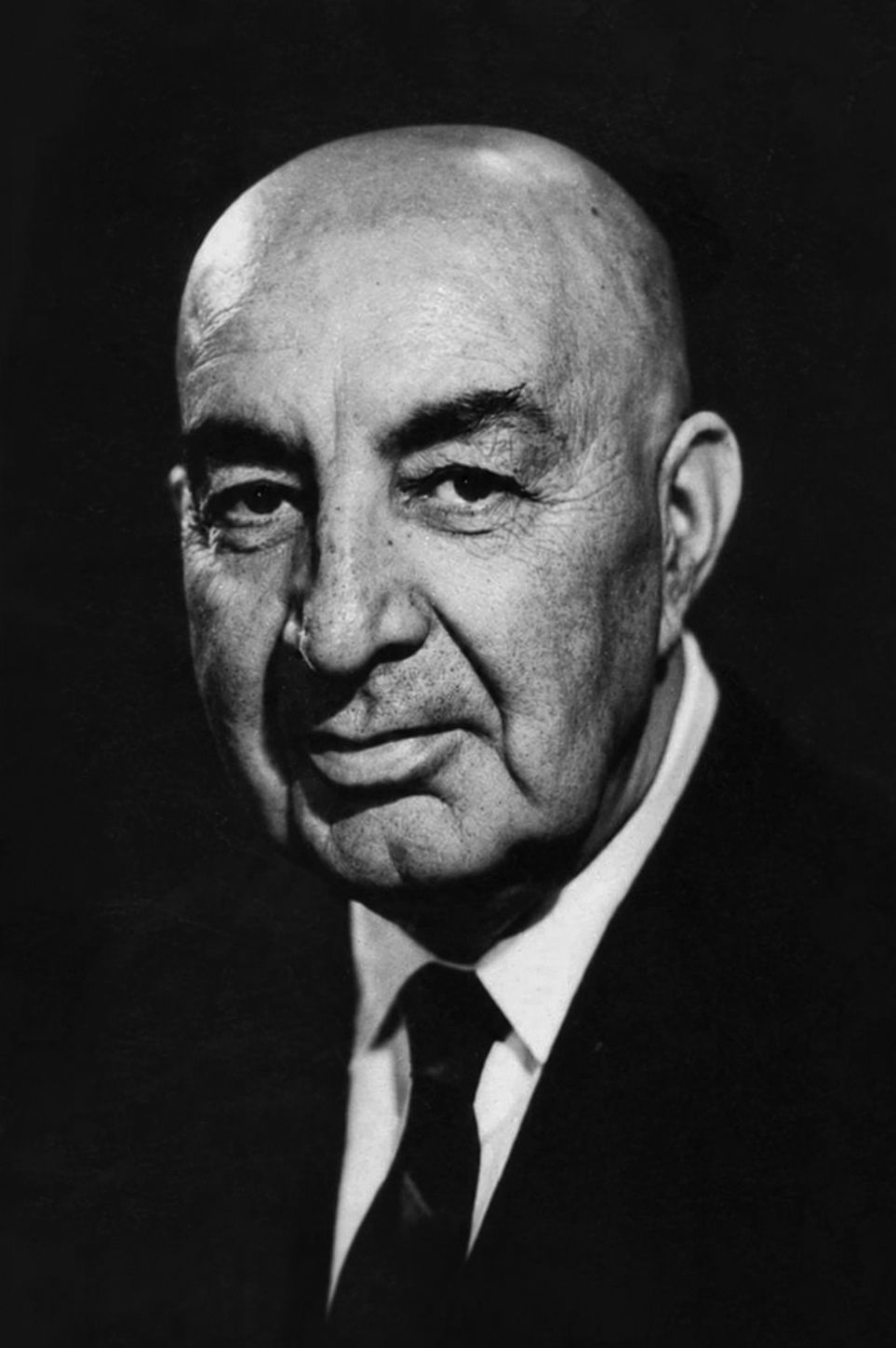
- Official portrait, 1973

1st President of Afghanistan
- In office 17 July 1973 – 28 April 1978
- Vice President: Sayyid Abdulillah
- Preceded by: Mohammad Zahir Shah (as King)
- Succeeded by: Abdul Qadir (acting); Nur Muhammad Taraki (as General Secretary)

Prime Minister of Afghanistan
- In office 7 September 1953 – 10 March 1963
- Monarch: Mohammad Zahir Shah
- Preceded by: Shah Mahmud Khan
- Succeeded by: Mohammad Yusuf

Personal details
- Born: 18 July 1909 Kabul, Emirate of Afghanistan
- Died: 28 April 1978 (aged 68) Kabul, Democratic Republic of Afghanistan
- Cause of death: Assassination
- Resting place: near Taj Beg hill
- Party: National Revolutionary Party
- Spouse: Zamina Begum
- Children: 8
- Parent: Mohammad Aziz Khan (father)

Military service
- Allegiance: Kingdom of Afghanistan (1939–1963); Republic of Afghanistan (1973–1978)
- Years of service: 1939–1978
- Rank: General
- Battles/wars: Afghan tribal revolts of 1944–1947; Siege of Kunar Khas; 1959 Mangal Uprising; Afghanistan–Pakistan border skirmishes; Bajaur Campaign; 1973 Afghan coup d'état; 1975 Panjshir Valley uprising; 1976 Afghan coup d'état attempt; Saur Revolution X
- De facto ruler of the Kingdom of Afghanistan (1953–1963): ← Shah Mahmud Khan; (Last in role) →

Mohammad Daoud Khan (Note: Pashto: محمد داود خان, romanized: Muhamad Dāwud Xān, pronounced [mʊ(h)ɐˈmad dɑˈwud xɑn]; Dari: محمد داود خان, romanized: Muhammad Dawūd Xān, pronounced [mʊ(ɦ)ɐmˈmad dɑːˈwuːd xɑːn]) (18 July 1909 – 28 April 1978), also romanized as Daud Khan or Dawood Khan, was an Afghan military officer and politician who served as prime minister of Afghanistan from 1953 to 1963 and, as leader of the 1973 Afghan coup d'état which overthrew the monarchy, served as the first president of Afghanistan from 1973 until his assassination in 1978.

Born into the Afghan royal family and addressed by the prefix "Sardar", Khan started as a provincial governor and later a military officer before being appointed as prime minister by his cousin, King Mohammad Zahir Shah, serving for a decade. Having failed to persuade the King to implement a one-party system, Khan overthrew the monarchy in a virtually bloodless coup with the backing of Afghan Army officers, and proclaimed himself the first president of the Republic of Afghanistan, establishing an autocratic one-party system under his National Revolutionary Party.

Khan was known for his autocratic rule, and for his educational and progressive social reforms.

Under his regime, he headed a purge of communists in the government, and many of his policies also displeased religious conservatives and liberals who were in favor of restoring the multiparty system that existed under the monarchy. Social and economic reforms implemented under his ruling were successful, but his foreign policy led to tense relations with neighboring countries. In 1978, he was deposed and assassinated during the 1978 Afghan coup d'état, led by the Afghan military and the communist People's Democratic Party of Afghanistan (PDPA). His body was discovered 30 years later and was identified by a small golden Quran gifted by King Khalid of Saudi Arabia he always carried. He received a state funeral.

== Early life ==
Mohammad Daoud Khan was born in Kabul, Emirate of Afghanistan, into a Mohammadzai Pashtun family and was the eldest son of the diplomat Prince Mohammad Aziz Khan (1877–1933; an older half-brother of King Mohammad Nadir Shah) and his wife, Khurshid Begum. His father was assassinated in 1933 in Berlin, while serving as the Afghan Ambassador to Germany. He and his brother Prince Naim Khan (1911–1978) then came under the tutelage of their uncle Mohammad Hashim Khan (1884–1953). Daoud proved to be an apt student of politics. Educated in France, he served as a senior administrator in the Kingdom of Afghanistan, serving as Governor of the Eastern Province in 1934–35 and in 1938–39, and was Governor of Kandahar Province from 1935 to 1938.

In 1939, Khan was promoted to Commander of the Central Forces. As commander, he led Afghan forces against the Safi during the Afghan tribal revolts of 1944–1947, and thereby came to national attention. Daoud's military victories contributed to his rise to power, including his later assumption of the office of prime minister.

From 1946 to 1948, he served as Defense Minister, then Interior Minister from 1949 to 1951. In 1948, he served as Afghan Ambassador to France.

In 1951, he was promoted to General and served in that capacity as Commander of the Central Corps of the Afghan Armed Forces in Kabul from 1951 to 1953.

== Royal Prime Minister ==
Khan was appointed prime minister in September 1953 through an intra-family transfer of power, replacing Shah Mahmud Khan. His ten-year tenure was noted for his foreign policy turn to the Soviet Union, the completion of the Helmand Valley project, which dramatically improved living conditions in southwestern Afghanistan, as well as tentative steps towards the emancipation of women, giving women a higher public presence, which led to significant amounts of freedom and educational opportunities for them.

With the creation of an independent Pakistan in August 1947, Prime Minister Daoud Khan had rejected the Durand Line, which had been accepted as international border by successive Afghan governments for over a half a century. Khan supported a nationalistic reunification of the Pakistani Pashtun people with Afghanistan, but this would have involved taking a considerable amount of territory from the new nation of Pakistan and was in direct opposition to an older plan of the 1940s whereby a confederation between the two countries was proposed. The move further worried the non-Pashtun populations of Afghanistan such as the minority Hazara, Tajik, and Uzbek, who suspected his intention was to increase the Pashtuns' disproportionate hold on political power.

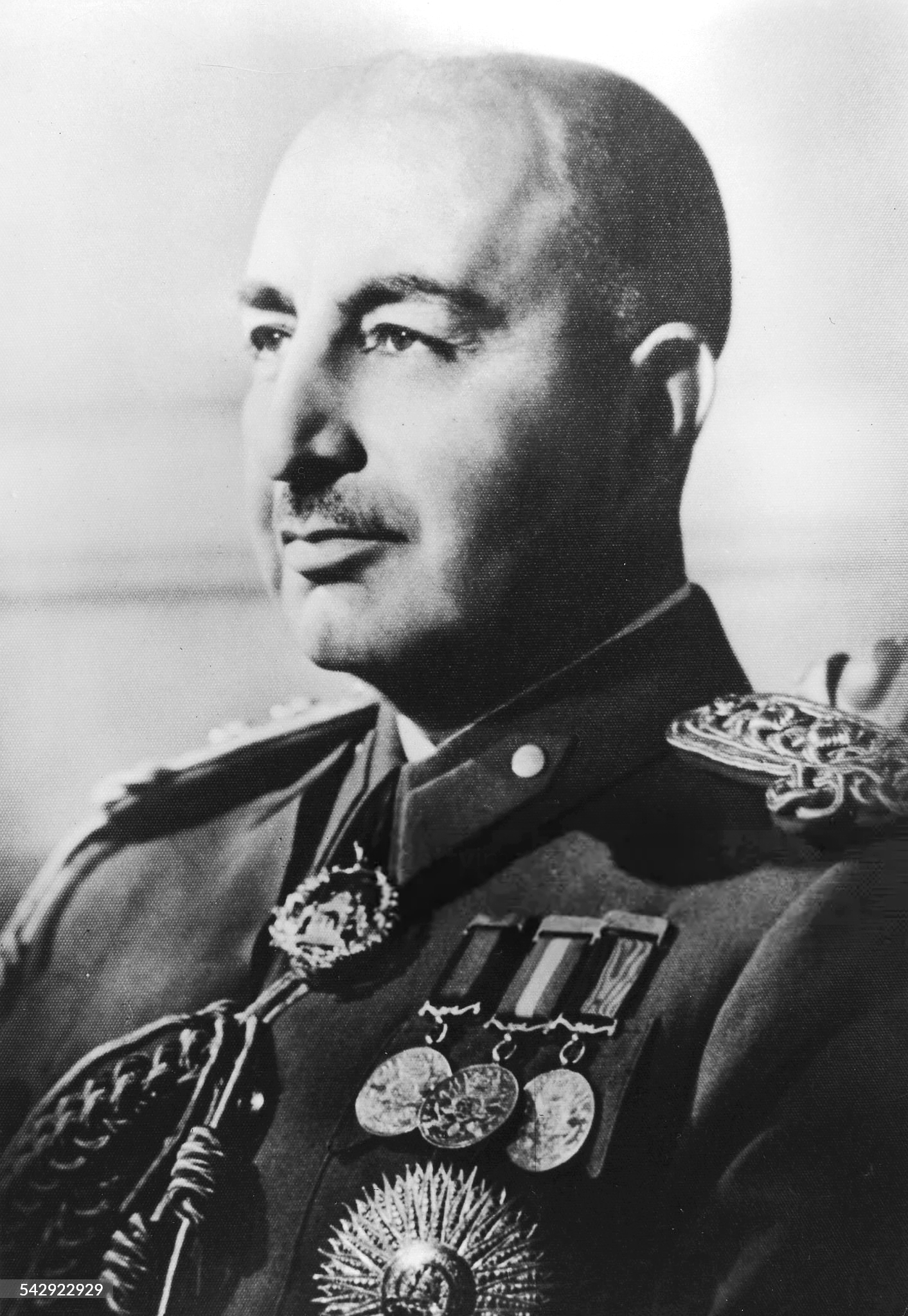
Daoud Khan in 1956

Abdul Ghaffar Khan (founder of Khudai Khidmatgar movement), stated "that Daoud Khan only exploited the idea of reunification of Pashtun people to meet his own political ends. The idea of reunification of Pashtun people never helped Pashtuns and it only caused trouble for Pakistan. In fact it was never a reality". Moreover, Daoud Khan's project for the reunification of the Pashtun people failed to gain support from the majority of Pashtuns in Pakistan.

In 1960, Khan sent troops across the poorly-marked Durand Line into the Bajaur Agency of Pakistan in an attempt to manipulate events in that area and to press the Pashtunistan issue, but the Afghan forces were defeated by the Pashtun Tribal militias. During this period, the propaganda war from Afghanistan, carried on by radio, was relentless. In 1961, Daoud Khan made another attempt to invade Bajaur with larger Afghan army this time. However, Pakistan employed F-86 Sabres jets which inflicted heavy casualties against the Afghan army unit and the tribesmen from Kunar province who were supporting the Afghan army. Several Afghan soldiers were also captured and were paraded in front of international media, which in turn caused embarrassment for Daoud Khan.

In 1961, as a result of his policies and support to militias in areas along the Durand Line, Pakistan closed its borders with Afghanistan and the latter severed ties, causing an economic crisis and greater dependence on the USSR. The USSR became Afghanistan's principal trading partner. Within a few months, the USSR sent jet airplanes, tanks, heavy and light artillery, for a heavily discounted price tag of $25 million, to Afghanistan. That same year he attended the 1st Summit of the Non-Aligned Movement in Belgrade making Afghanistan one of the founding members of the Non-Aligned Movement.

As a result of continued resentment against Daoud's autocratic rule, close ties with the USSR and economic downturn because of the blockade imposed by Pakistan, Daoud Khan was asked to resign. Instead of resigning, Daoud Khan requested King Zahir Shah to approve new 'one-party constitution' proposed by him which would in turn increase Daoud Khan's already considerable power. Upon rejection, Daoud Khan angrily resigned.

The crisis was finally resolved with his forced resignation in March 1963 and the re-opening of the border in May. Pakistan continued to remain suspicious of Afghan intentions and Daoud's policy left a negative impression in the eyes of many Tajiks who felt they were being disenfranchised for the sake of Pashtun nationalism. He was succeeded by Mohammad Yusuf.

In 1964, King Zahir Shah introduced a new constitution, for the first time excluding all members of the royal family from the Council of Ministers. Khan had already stepped down. In addition to having been prime minister, he had also held the portfolios of Minister of Defense and Minister of Planning until 1963.

== Presidency and death ==
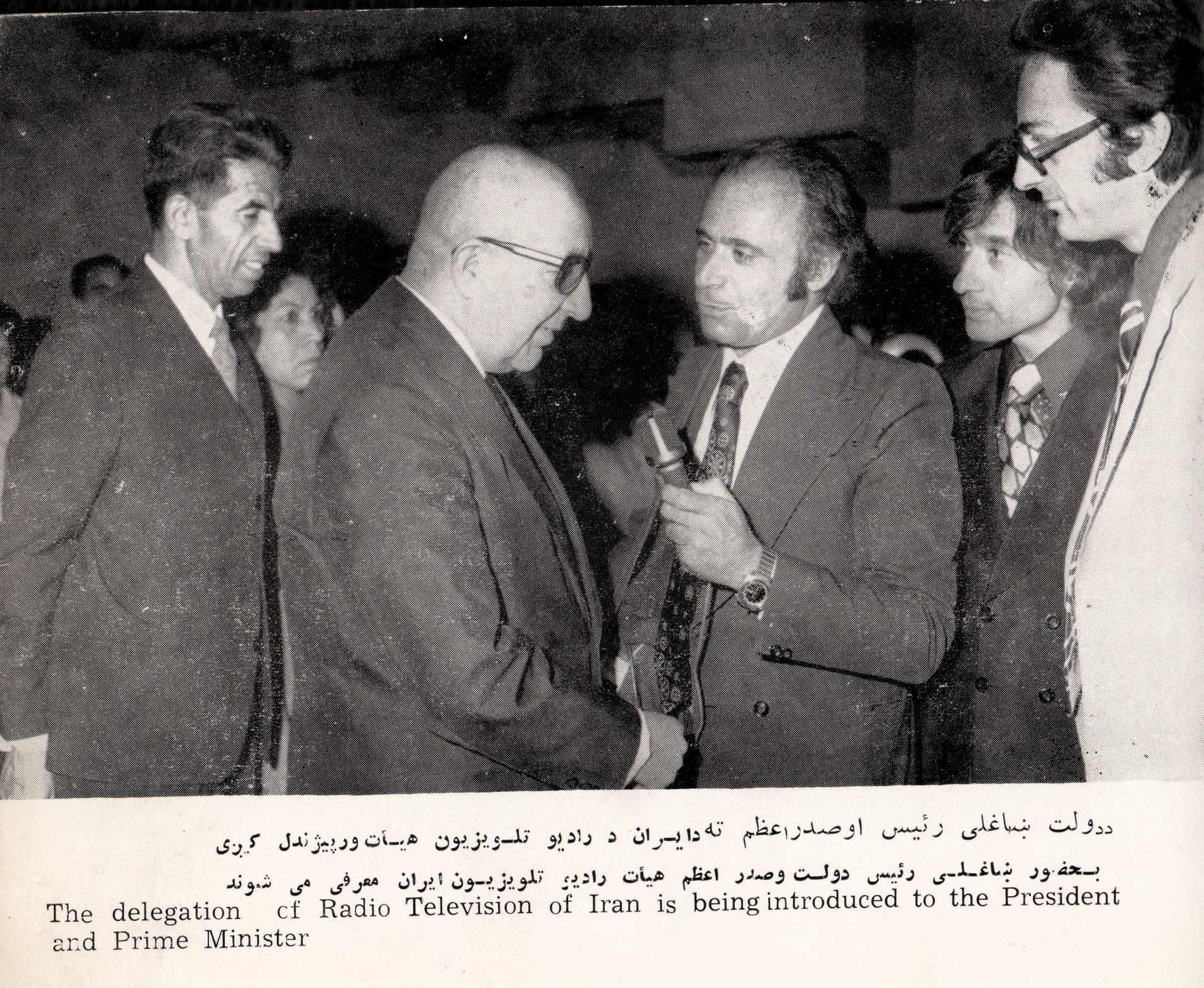
Daoud Khan visiting National Iranian Radio and Television in Iran, c. 1974.

Khan was unsatisfied with King Zahir Shah's constitutional parliamentary system and lack of progress. He planned rebellion for more than a year before he seized power from the King on 17 July 1973. The coup was bloodless, and backed by a large number of army officers who were loyal to him, facing no resistance.

Departing from tradition, and for the first time in Afghan history, he did not proclaim himself Shah, establishing instead a republic with himself as president. The role of pro-communist Parchamite officers in the coup led to him receiving the nickname "Red Prince" by some.

King Zahir Shah's constitution establishing a parliament with elected members and the separation of powers was replaced by a now largely nominated loya jirga (meaning "grand assembly"). The parliament was disbanded.

Although he was close to the Soviet Union during his prime ministership, Khan continued the Afghan policy of non-alignment with the Cold War superpowers. Nor did he bring drastic pro-Soviet change to the economic system.

In Khan's new cabinet, many ministers were fresh faced politicians, and only Dr Abdul Majid was a ministerial carryover from Khan's Prime Minister era (1953–1963); Majid was Minister of Education from 1953 to 1957, and from 1973 was appointed Minister of Justice until 1977. Initially about half of the new cabinet were either current members, former members or sympathizers of the PDPA, but over time their influence would be eradicated by Khan.

Daoud cabinet (1973)
Office	Incumbent	Took office	Left office
Deputy Prime Minister	Mohammad Hassan Sharq	2 August 1973	
Minister of Education	Niamatullah Pazhwak	2 August 1973	December 1974
Minister of Agriculture	Ghulam Jalani Bakhtari	2 August 1973	September 1975
Minister of Communications	Abdul Hamid Mohtat	2 August 1973	April 1974
Minister of Frontier and Tribal Affairs	Pacha Gul Wafadar	2 August 1973	April 1974
Minister of Interior	Faiz Mohammad	2 August 1973	September 1975
Minister of Finance	Abdulillah	2 August 1973	
Minister of Justice	Abdul Majid	2 August 1973	
Minister of Mines, Industries	Abdul Qayyum	2 August 1973	
Minister of Information	Abdul Rahim Nawin	2 August 1973	
Minister of Health	Nazar Mohammad Sikandar	2 August 1973	

A coup against Khan, which may have been planned before he took power, was repressed shortly after his seizure of power. In October 1973, Mohammad Hashim Maiwandwal, a former prime minister and a highly respected former diplomat, was arrested in a coup plot and died in prison before his trial set for December 1973. This was at a time when Parchamites controlled the Ministry of Interior under circumstances corroborating the widespread belief that he had been tortured to death by the leftists. According to one account, Daoud Khan planned to appoint Maiwandwal as prime minister, leading to the Parchamite Minister of Interior, Faiz Mohammad, along with fellow communists, framing Maiwandwal in a coup plot, then torturing him to death without Daoud Khan's knowledge. Louis Dupree wrote that Maiwandwal, one of few Afghan politicians with an international reputation, could have been a leader in a democratic process and therefore a target for communists. One of the army generals arrested under suspicion of this plot with Maiwandwal was Mohammed Asif Safi, who was later released. Khan personally apologized to him for the arrest. In 1974, he signed one of two economic packages that aimed to greatly increase the capability of the Afghan military. At this time, there were increasing concerns that Afghanistan lacked a modern army comparable to the militaries of Iran and Pakistan.

In 1975, his government nationalized all banks in Afghanistan, including Da Afghanistan Bank, Afghanistan's central bank.

Khan wanted to lessen the country's dependence on the Soviet Union and attempted to promote a new foreign policy. In 1975 he visited some countries in the Middle East, including Egypt, Turkey, Saudi Arabia, and Iran, all of which were anti-Soviet states, to ask for aid, He also visited India. Regarding the Non-Aligned Movement summit in Havana, Khan said that Cuba "only pretends to be non-aligned." Surprisingly, he did not renew the Pashtunistan agitation; relations with Pakistan improved thanks to interventions from the US and the Shah of Iran. These moves alerted the Soviets.

=== Constitution of 1977 ===
In 1977, he established his own political party, the National Revolutionary Party, which became the focus of all political activity. In January 1977, a loya jirga approved a new constitution. It wrote in several new articles and amended others - one of these was the creation of a presidential one-party system of government. He also began to moderate his socialist policies, although the 1977 constitution had a nationalist bend in addition to previous socialism and Islam.

Daoud cabinet (1977)
Office	Incumbent	Took office	Left office
Minister of Planning	Ali Ahmad Khurram	13 March 1977	
Minister of Defence	Ghulam Haidar Rasuli	13 March 1977	
Minister of Interior	Abdul Qadir Nuristani	13 March 1977	
Minister of Education	Ibrahim Majid Siraj	13 March 1977	
Minister of Finance	Sayyid Abdullah	13 March 1977	
Minister of Commerce	Mohammad Khan Jalalar	13 March 1977	
Ministry of Public Works	Ghausuddin Fayeq	13 March 1977	
Minister of Border Affairs	Abdul Qayyum	13 March 1977	
Minister of Justice	Wafiyullah Sami'i	13 March 1977	
Minister of Communications	Abdul Karim Atayi	13 March 1977	
Minister of Mines, Industries	Abdul Tawab Asefi	13 March 1977	
Minister of Water, Power	Juma Muhammad Muhammadi	13 March 1977	
Minister of Higher Education	Ghulam Siddiq Muhibi	13 March 1977	
Minister of Health	Abdullah Omar	13 March 1977	
Minister of Agriculture	Azizullah Wasefi	13 March 1977	
Ministry of Information	Abdul Rahim Navin	13 March 1977	
Ministry without portfolio	Abdul Majid	13 March 1977	
Deputy Minister of Foreign Affairs	Wahid Abdullah	13 March 1977	

During the latter years of his administration, his purge of communists from the government strained his relations with them, while his desire for one person rule created conflicts with the liberals who had been in charge during the monarchy. At the same time, his persecution of religious conservatives engendered enmity with them and their followers as well.

=== Relations with Pakistan ===
As during his time as prime minister, Daoud Khan again pressed on the question of Pashtunistan, again leading to sometimes tense relations with Pakistan.

Daoud hosted General Secretary of the National Awami Party Khan Abdul Wali Khan, Ajmal Khattak, Juma Khan Sufi, Baluch guerrillas, and others. Khan's government and forces also commenced training of anti-Pakistani groups to conduct militant action and sabotage in Pakistan. The campaign was significant enough that even one of Bhutto's senior colleagues, minister of interior and head of the provincial branch of Bhutto's party of/in the then-North-West Frontier Province (renamed Khyber Pakhtunkhwa in 2010), Hayat Sherpao, was killed, ostensibly on the orders of the later-acquitted Awami Party. As a result, Afghanistan's already strained relationship with Pakistan further dipped and Pakistan likewise started similar kinds of cross-border interference. By 1975, Pakistani Prime Minister Zulfiqar Ali Bhutto, through its Inter-Services Intelligence (ISI), had begun to engage in promoting a proxy war in Afghanistan.

1975 was a watershed year in Afghan-Pakistan relations. Pakistan blamed Afghanistan for unrest in Bajaur agency and the bombing of a PIA B707 at Islamabad airport in 1975. The 130 passengers of PIA B707 had deplaned before the explosion took place and thus no one was harmed in the explosion inside the aircraft.

At the same time, Afghanistan also faced several short lived uprisings in retaliation in eastern Afghanistan and in Panjshir valley, which Afghanistan blamed on Pakistan. There was also deployment of additional troops by both the countries along the Afghanistan-Pakistan border.

The same year Kabul was also quietly negotiating with Islamabad to defuse the tensions between the two countries. In early 1976, relations between the two countries improved and the leaders of the two countries, Zulfiqar Ali Bhutto and Douad Khan, exchanged visits. Daoud Khan was also worried about the growing power of communists within his government so he started improving his relations with Pakistan and Iran. The same year Pakistan also provided aid to Afghanistan to help alleviate the suffering caused by earthquake and floods in northern Afghanistan. This gesture by Pakistan had helped mollify Afghan public opinion about Pakistan.

By October 1976, the head of Pakistan intelligence agency, Jilani was informing a US diplomat that Afghanistan was no longer creating troubles for Pakistan. By August 1976 relations with Pakistan had improved to a high degree. Later on, while promoting his new foreign policy doctrine, Daoud Khan came to a tentative agreement on a solution to the Pashtunistan problem with Ali Bhutto.

=== Diplomatic relations with the Soviet Union ===
Khan met Leonid Brezhnev on a state visit to Moscow from 12 to 15 April 1977. He had asked for a private meeting with the Soviet leader to discuss with him the increased pattern of Soviet actions in Afghanistan. In particular, he discussed the intensified Soviet attempt to unite the two factions of the Afghan communist parties, Parcham and Khalq. Brezhnev described Afghanistan's non-alignment as important to the USSR and essential to the promotion of peace in Asia, and warned him about the presence of experts from NATO countries stationed in the northern parts of Afghanistan. Daoud bluntly replied:

"we will never allow you to dictate to us how to run our country and whom to employ in Afghanistan. How and where we employ the foreign experts will remain the exclusive prerogative of the Afghan state. Afghanistan shall remain poor, if necessary, but free in its acts and decisions"

"All of his life experience is evidence that Sardar Mohammad Daoud Khan would not bow to foreigners, regardless of their nationality. Particularly, in his last meeting with [Soviet leader] Leonid Brezhnev, he proved his bravery and patriotism. But KGB deceptions and the games that they played could have benefited from Daoud Khan's influence in the armed forces. So Daoud Khan, indirectly and with total unawareness, could have been manipulated by the KGB."

— Sayed Makhdoom Raheen in 2003

=== Communist coup and assassination ===
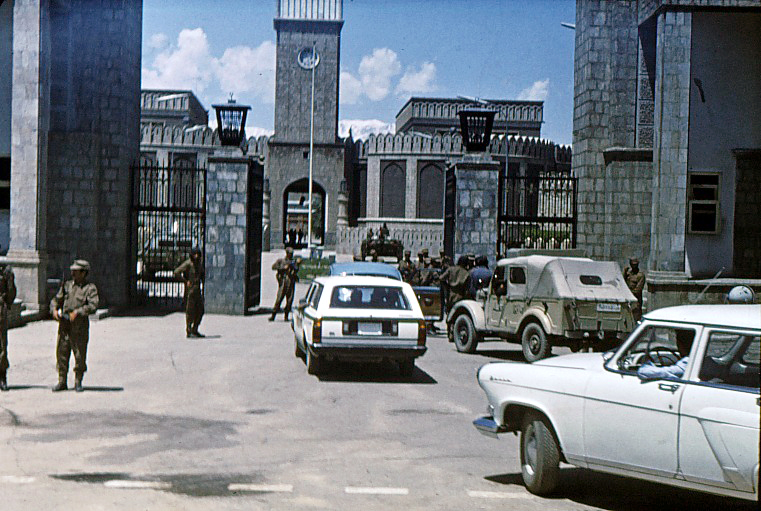
Outside the front gates of the Arg (the presidential palace, formerly the chief royal palace) in Kabul, the day after the Saur Revolution (28 April 1978)

After the murder of Mir Akbar Khyber, the prominent Parchamite ideologue, his funeral on 19 April 1978 served as a rallying point for the Afghan communists. An estimated 1,000 to 3,000 people gathered to hear speeches by PDPA leaders such as Nur Muhammad Taraki, Hafizullah Amin and Babrak Karmal.

Shocked by this demonstration of communist unity, Khan ordered the arrest of the PDPA leaders, but he acted too slowly. It took him a week to arrest Taraki, Karmal managed to escape to the USSR, and Amin was merely placed under house arrest. Khan had misjudged the situation and believed that Karmal's Parcham faction was the main communist threat. In fact, according to PDPA documents, Amin's Khalq faction had extensively infiltrated the military and they outnumbered Parcham cells by a factor of 2 to 3. Amin sent complete orders for the coup from his home while it was under armed guard, using his family members as messengers. The army had been put on alert on 26 April because of a presumed coup. On 27 April 1978, a coup d'état, beginning with troop movements at the military base at Kabul International Airport, gained ground slowly over the next twenty-four hours as rebels battled units loyal to Daoud Khan in and around the capital.

Khan and most of his family were shot dead during the coup by members of the People's Democratic Party of Afghanistan (PDPA) inside the Gulkhana Palace of the Arg. The coup climaxed in the Arg, the former chief royal palace, during the early hours of 28 April 1978, involving heavy fighting and many deaths.

Shortly afterward, the new military leaders announced that Khan had been killed for refusing to pledge allegiance to the new regime by Lieutenant Imamuddin of the 444th Commando Battalion. Upon Daoud's assassination, Afghan singer Fazal Ghani wrote the song "Khalqi Nizam" which mocked the former president for his baldness and for being "finished with one strike", which was aired on Radio Television Afghanistan.

== Body and state funeral ==
On 28 June 2008, his body and those of his family were found in two separate mass graves outside the walls of Pul-e-Charkhi prison, District 12 of Kabul city. Initial reports indicate that sixteen corpses were in one grave and twelve in the other. On 4 December 2008, the Afghan Health Ministry announced that Daoud's body had been identified on the basis of teeth molds and a small golden Quran, a present he had received from the King of Saudi Arabia, found near the body.

On 17 March 2009, General Daoud was given a state funeral. His only surviving child, Dorkhanai, attended the funeral.

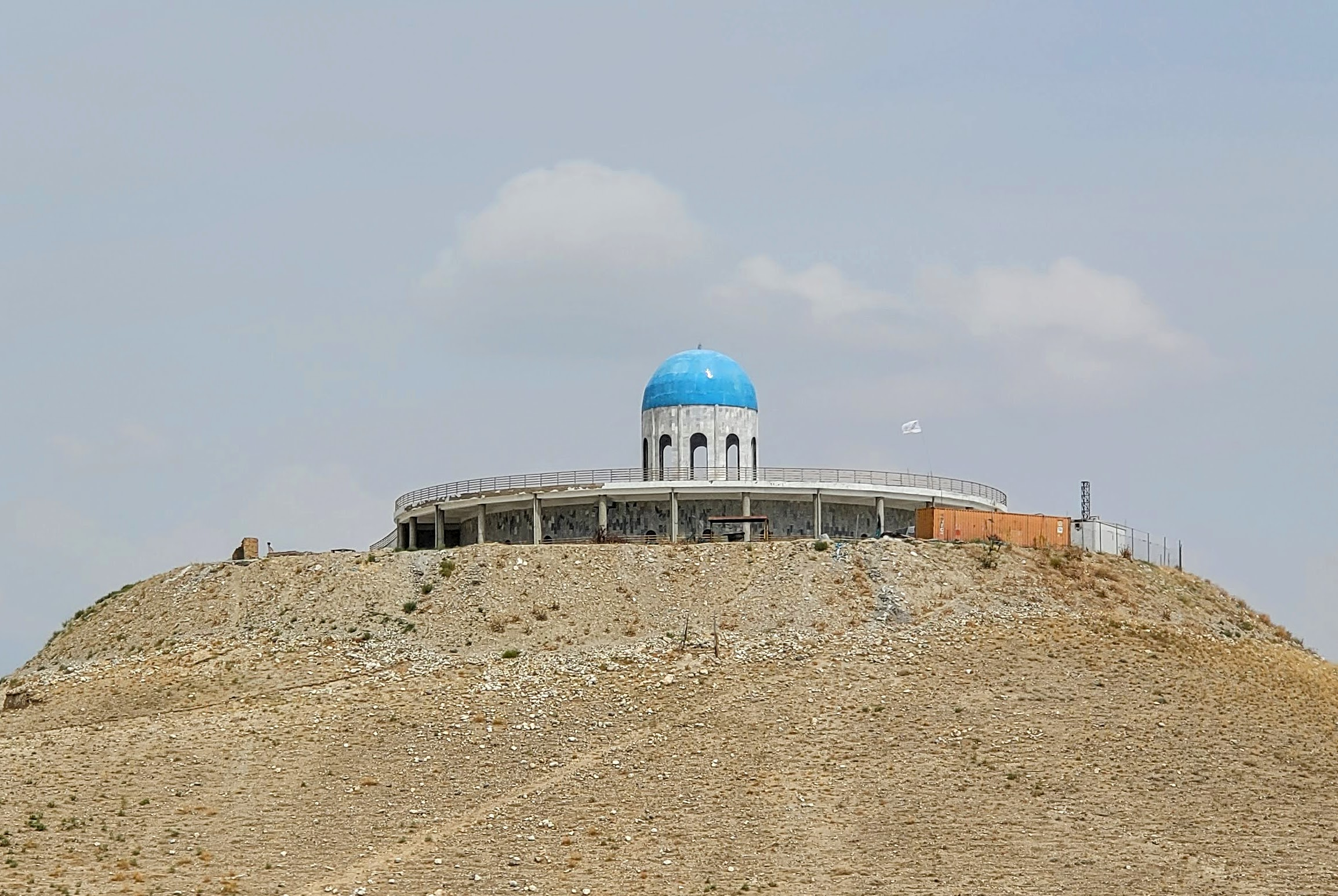
Tomb of Sardar Daoud Khan (July 2022)

Daoud and those family members that were also assassinated on 28 April 1978 are buried at an incomplete hilltop tomb located 2.5 km west of Darul Aman Palace, Kabul.

== Public image ==
News sources in the 1970s claimed that General Daoud Khan said he was happiest when he could "light his American cigarettes with Soviet matches."

Mohammad Daoud Khan was retrospectively described as an "old-fashioned statesman, compassionate yet reserved and authoritarian" by The Guardian's Nushin Arbabzadeh. Then-President Hamid Karzai hailed Khan's courage and patriotism in comments after his 2009 state funeral, saying he was "always thinking of the advancement and prosperity of the country." Some Afghans fondly consider him to be the best leader their country has had in modern times.

During his time as prime minister and president, Khan was highly unpopular among the non-Pashtun minorities in Afghanistan because of his alleged Pashtun favouritism. During his regime, all significant positions in the government, army and educational institutions were held by Pashtuns. His attempt at the Pashtunisation of Afghanistan reached such an extent that the word 'Afghan' started being used to refer only to Pashtuns and not to the other minority groups who collectively formed a majority in Afghanistan.

The Afghan Armed Forces were allied with Daoud Khan and supported his goal of promoting Pashtuns to higher posts in the Afghan Armed Forces. In 1963, Afghan Uzbeks were barred from becoming high-ranking officers in the Afghan armed forces. Similarly only a few Tajiks were allowed to hold the position of officer in the Afghan army, while other ethnicities were excluded from those positions, despite making up more than 50% of the Royal Afghan Army's personnel.

Daoud Khan viewed the Afghan armed forces as a crucial vector in the Pashtunisation of Afghan state. The Panjshir uprising in 1975 is also believed to be result of anti-Pashtun frustration which had been building up in Panjshir valley as result of Daoud Khan's policies.

== Personal life ==
In September 1934, Daoud Khan married his cousin, Princess Zamina Begum (11 January 1917 – 28 April 1978), sister of King Zahir (15 October 1914 – 23 July 2007). The couple had four sons and four daughters:

- 1. Zarlasht Daoud Khan (1953 – k. 1978)
- 2. Khalid Daoud Khan (1947 – k. 1978). Had a son:
  - Tariq Daoud Khan
- 3. Wais Daoud Khan (1947 – k. 1978). Had four children:
  - Turan Daoud Khan (1972–)
  - Ares Daoud Khan (1973 – k. 1978)
  - Waygal Daoud Khan (1976 – k. 1978)
  - Zahra Khanum (1970–)
- 4. Muhammad Umar Daoud Khan (1934 – k. 1978). Had two daughters:
  - Hila Khanum (1961 – k. 1978)
  - Ghazala Khanum (1964 – k. 1978)
- 5. Dorkhanai Begum
- 6. Shinkay Begum (1940 – k. 1978). Had two daughters:
  - Ariane Heila Khanum Ghazi (1961–)
  - Hawa Khanum Ghazi (1963–)
- 7. Torpekay Begum. Had three children:
  - Shah Mahmud Khan Ghazi
  - Daud Khan Ghazi
  - Zahra Khanum Ghazi

== Ancestry ==
Ancestors of Mohammad Daoud Khan

8. Sardar Yahya Khan (= 12)
4. Sardar Mohammad Yusuf Khan
9. Hamdan Sultana Begum (= 13) (Note: daughter of Wazir Akbar Khan)
2. Sardar Mohammad Aziz Khan
10. Sardar Abdullah Khan
5. Mastura Begum
11. a daughter of Sardar Mohammad Umar Khan
1. Sardar Mohammad Daoud Khan
12. Sardar Yahya Khan (= 8)
6. Sardar Mohammad Asif Khan
13. Hamdan Sultana Begum (= 9)
3. Khurshid Begum
7. Murwarid Begum

== Notes ==
Political offices
Preceded by Shah Mahmud Khan	Prime Minister of Afghanistan; 1953–1963	Succeeded by Mohammad Yusuf
Preceded by Mohammad Zahir Shah as King	1st President of Afghanistan; 1973–1978	Succeeded by Nur Muhammad Taraki as Chairman of the Presidium of the Revolutionary Council
Preceded by Mohammad Zahir Shah as King	1st President of Afghanistan; 1973–1978	Vacant Title next held by Mohammad Najibullah (1987)
