= Saur Revolution =

1978 military coup in Afghanistan

- Part of the Cold War and the Afghan conflict
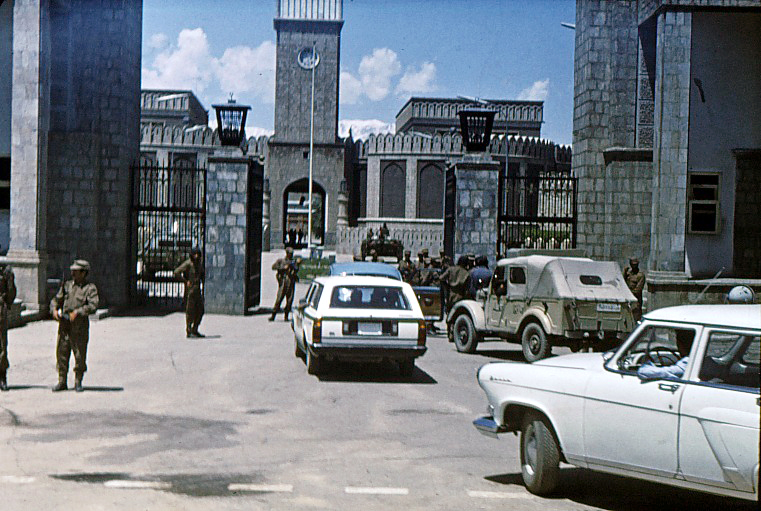
- Troops and vehicles at the gates of the Arg (presidential palace) in Kabul on 28 April 1978
Date	27–28 April 1978 (1 day)
Location	Afghanistan 34°31′31″N 69°10′42″E
Result	PDPA victory; Overthrow and execution of Mohammad Daoud Khan and his family; Purging of Daoud's supporters from the government; Establishment of the Democratic Republic of Afghanistan; Eventual Soviet military intervention

Belligerents
Republic of Afghanistan	People's Democratic Party of Afghanistan

Commanders and leaders
Mohammad Daoud Khan X; (Republic of Afghanistan (1973–1978)) Mohammed Naim Khan X; (Republic of Afghanistan (1973–1978)) Abdul Qadir Nuristani X; (Republic of Afghanistan (1973–1978)) Ghulam Haidar Rasuli (executed); (Republic of Afghanistan (1973–1978)) Sayyid Abdulillah †; (Republic of Afghanistan (1973–1978)) Mohammad Nazim †; (Republic of Afghanistan (1973–1978)) Haji Nawaz †; (Republic of Afghanistan (1973–1978)) Abdul Sattar Khan †	Nur Muhammad Taraki; Hafizullah Amin; Mohammad Aslam Watanjar; Mohammed Rafie; Abdul Qadir; Mohammed Yakub; Major Khaleelullah; Nazar Mohammad

Units involved
Afghan Armed Forces; Afghan Republican Army; 11th Infantry Division; 25th Infantry Division; 1st Central Army Corps; Republican Guard Brigade; 717th Civil Disciplinary Regiment; 7th Infantry Division (surrendered); 8th Infantry Division; Afghan Commando Forces; 242nd Parachute Battalion; 444th Commando Battalion; 455th Commando Battalion	PDPA defectors; Afghan Republican Army; 11th Division; 1st Central Army Corps; 7th Division; 4th Armored Brigade; 15th Armored Brigade; 88th Heavy Artillery Brigade; Afghan Commando Forces; 242nd Parachute Battalion; 444th Commando Battalion; 455th Commando Battalion; Afghan Air Force; 322nd Air Regiment; 355th Air Regiment; 373rd Air Regiment

Strength
12,500 personnel	1,300 personnel

Casualties and losses
- 2,000+ killed (combined)
- Location of Afghanistan's capital city

The Saur Revolution, (Note: Pashto: د ثور کودتا, romanized: Də Sawr kudetā, pronounced [də ˈsɐʊɾ kudeˈtɑ]; lit. 'Saur coup d'état'; Dari: انقلاب ثور, romanized: Inqilāb-i Sawr, cyrillized: Инқилоби Савр, pronounced [ʔɪɴqɪˈlɑːbɪ saʊɾ]) also known as the April Revolution or the April Coup, was a violent coup d'état and uprising staged on 27 and 28 April 1978 (Note: Dari: ۷ ثور; lit. '7th Saur') by the People's Democratic Party of Afghanistan (PDPA), which overthrew Afghan president Mohammad Daoud Khan, who had himself taken power in the 1973 Afghan coup d'état and established an autocratic one-party system in the country. Daoud and most of his family were executed at the Arg presidential palace in the capital city of Kabul by Khalqist (a PDPA faction) military officers, after which his supporters were also purged and killed. The successful PDPA uprising resulted in the creation of a socialist Afghan government that was closely aligned with the Soviet Union, with Nur Muhammad Taraki serving as the PDPA's General Secretary of the Revolutionary Council. Saur (also rendered Sowr) is the Dari-language name for the second month of the Solar Hijri calendar, during which the events took place.

The uprising was ordered by PDPA member Hafizullah Amin, who would become a significant figure in the revolutionary Afghan government. At a press conference in New York City in June 1978, Amin claimed that the event was not a coup d'état, but rather a "popular revolution" carried out by the "will of the people" against Daoud's government. The Saur Revolution involved heavy fighting throughout Afghanistan and resulted in the deaths of as many as 2,000 military personnel and civilians combined. It remains a significant event in Afghanistan's history as it marked the beginning of decades of continuous conflict in the country.

== Background ==
With the support and assistance of minority political party the People's Democratic Party of Afghanistan (PDPA), Mohammad Daoud Khan took power in the 1973 Afghan coup d'état by overthrowing the monarchy ruled by his first cousin, King Mohammad Zahir Shah, and established the first Republic of Afghanistan. Since then, several coup attempts against Daoud's government had occurred such as those in September 1973, August 1974, and December 1976. According to some of the PDPA's leaders, the party had begun plotting a possible coup attempt as early as 1976.

President Daoud was convinced that closer ties and military support from the Soviet Union would allow Afghanistan to take control of Pashtun lands in northwestern Pakistan. However, Daoud, who was ostensibly committed to a policy of non-alignment, became uneasy over Soviet attempts to dictate Afghanistan's foreign policy, and relations between the two countries deteriorated.

Under the secular government of Daoud, factionalism and rivalry developed in the PDPA, with two main factions being the Parcham and Khalq factions. On 17 April 1978, a prominent member of the Parcham, Mir Akbar Khyber, was assassinated. Although the government issued a statement deploring the assassination and claiming Gulbuddin Hekmatyar responsible, Nur Muhammad Taraki of the PDPA charged that the government was responsible, a belief that was shared by much of the Kabul intelligentsia. PDPA leaders apparently feared that Daoud was planning to eliminate them. On April 19, massive protests broke out in Kabul as a result of Khyber's death. Alarmed at the size and strength of the demonstrations, Daoud Khan ordered security officials to suppress the protestors and the leadership of the PDPA.

The Khalqists were highly successful at recruiting supporters within the army due to widespread disillusionment with Daud appointing officers based on nepotistic or tribal connections, in addition to Parcham being associated with government collaboration.

During the funeral ceremonies for Khyber, a protest against the government occurred, and shortly thereafter, most of the leaders of PDPA, including Babrak Karmal, were arrested. Hafizullah Amin was put under house arrest, which gave him a chance to order an uprising, one that had been slowly coalescing for more than two years. Amin, without having the authority, instructed the Afghan army officers in the PDPA's Khalqist faction to overthrow the government. The KGB, having been informed of the coup two days earlier by Mohammed Rafie and Sayed Mohammad Gulabzoy, accused the Iranian SAVAK of tricking PDPA supporters into starting a rebellion.

== Uprising ==
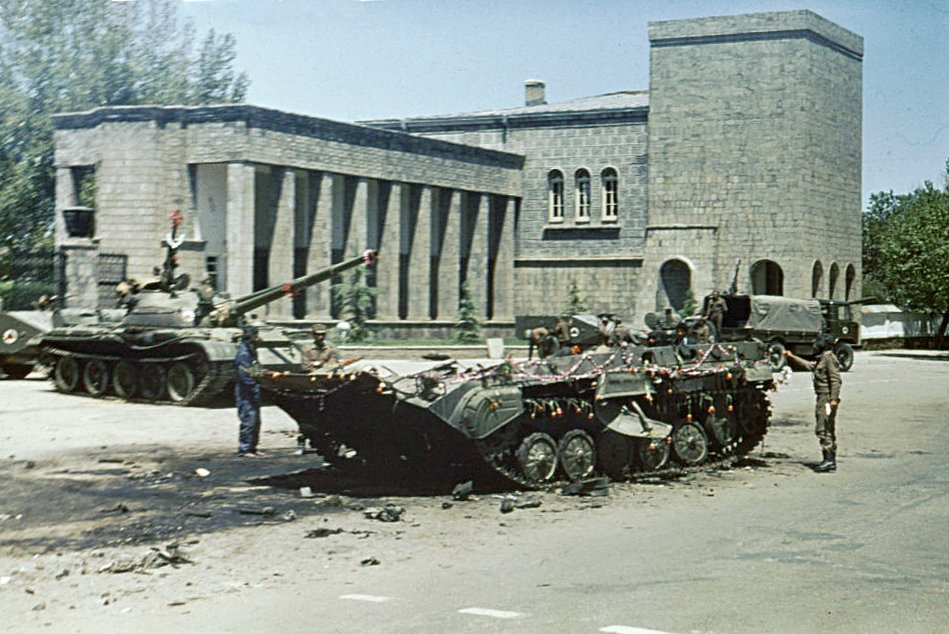
A BMP-1 infantry fighting vehicle, used by the PDPA, destroyed by the Presidential Guard

Preliminary steps for the coup came in April, when a tank commander under Daoud warned of intelligence suggesting an attack on Kabul in the near future, specifically 27 April. On the commander's recommendation, tanks (mostly Soviet-made T-55 and T-62 tanks) were positioned around the Arg, the presidential palace. On the 27th, the tanks turned their guns on the palace. The tank commander who made the request had, in secret, defected to the PDPA's Khalq faction beforehand.

In order to distract the government of the Republic of Afghanistan, PDPA sympathizers within the Afghan Armed Forces planted weapons and undetonated explosives in certain areas and tipped security forces to their locations, blaming Islamist groups. This was done in order to distract the government from the PDPA's activities and to shift the government's attention towards the leftist's ideological enemies, leading to the weakening of any Islamist organizations in Afghanistan.

On the early morning of the day of the coup, Daoud had just gotten ready when one of his office members informed him of a "riot" that was taking place in one of the military garrisons in Kabul. Daoud hurried to his office and asked his secretary to get hold of the phone number of the Chief of Staff, which could not be done after ten minutes of effort and additional attempts of finding the numbers of other military chiefs. A minute later, the telephone stopped working, as the 4th and 15th Tank Brigades began firing at the Arg. 50 armored vehicles belonging to the 4th Tank Brigade entered the city under the orders of then-Senior Captain Aslam Watanjar, and at the same time, Abdul Qadir took control of the MiG-21-equipped 322nd Air Regiment. A BMP-1 infantry fighting vehicle, used by the PDPA in their coup, was destroyed by the Republican Guard Brigade using an RPG-7, in front of the Arg.

According to an eyewitness, the first signs of the impending coup in Kabul, at about noon on 27 April, were reports of a tank column headed toward the city, smoke of unknown origin near the Ministry of Defense, and armed men, some in military uniform, guarding Ariana Circle, a major intersection. The first shots heard were near the Ministry of Interior in the downtown Shahr-e Naw section of Kabul, where a company of policemen apparently confronted an advancing tank column. From there the fighting spread to other areas of the city. Later that afternoon, the first fighter planes, Sukhoi Su-7s, came in low and fired rockets at the Arg in the center of the city. In the early evening, an announcement was broadcast on government-owned Radio Afghanistan that the Khalq were overthrowing the Daoud government. The use of the word Khalq, and its traditional association with the communists in Afghanistan, made clear that the PDPA was leading the coup, and also that the rebels had captured the radio station. The Presidential Guard, present at the Arg, additionally thought that they were fighting against Islamists, not the PDPA.

At approximately 10:30am, an echelon of tanks moved towards the Afghan Air Force Headquarters, being directed there by Nazar Mohammad and Sayed Mohammad Gulabzoy from the Air Force Gendarmerie Base, firing at the headquarters. The Kabul International Airport Security Division Commander 2nd Lieutenant Khan Jan Maqbal, being caught off guard as they were performing Attan, hurriedly gathered the security unit to fire at the tanks, as the Khalqist tank crews fired shells towards the unit, killing Maqbal as surviving members of security unit were scattered. The tank crew eventually gained control of the headquarters, engaging in executions of officers. As Abdul Qadir landed in Bagram Airfield by helicopter, Daoud Taroon also engaged in the impartial killings of officers who just happened to be present at the airfield, accusing them of "opposing the coup". Anthony Hyman, a British writer, has recorded the deaths of 30 officers as a result of the killings. In truth, former Afghan Army officer Mohammad Nabi Azimi states that these killings were not performed due to opposition to the coup, but rather due to personal disputes or bloodlust. Additionally, Azimi claimed that Western estimates on casualties during the coup were exacerbated, claiming only 40 people might've died all together.

As resistance waned, the leadership of the Afghan Army—consisting of Defence Minister Ghulam Haidar Rasuli, Brigadier General Abdul Ali Wardak and Lieutenant General Abdul Aziz—left Tajbeg Palace, the headquarters of the 1st Central Corps, and hid in the house of a gardener who reported their location to the PDPA rebels. In the morning, they were arrested and summarily executed in Pul-e-Charkhi prison.

Lastly, at 11:30pm, armored units were dispatched to Jalalabad to fight loyalist officers of the Afghan Army's 11th Division who refused to accept the coup, with the death toll nearing 1000 people. The commander of the 11th Division was eventually shot dead.

=== Execution of Daoud and government purge ===
For the first time in the history of Afghanistan, the last remnants of monarchy, tyranny, despotism and power of the dynasty of the tyrant Nader Khan has ended and all powers of the state are in the hands of the people of Afghanistan.

— Announcement on Radio Afghanistan at 7pm

The aerial attacks on the palace intensified about midnight as six Su-7s made repeated rocket attacks, lighting up the city. The next morning, 28 April, Kabul was mostly quiet, although the sound of gunfire could still be heard on the southern side of the city. As the people of Kabul ventured out of their homes they realized that the rebels were in complete control of the city and learned that President Daoud and his brother Naim had been killed early that morning. After a day of fighting, an army lieutenant of the 444th Commando Brigade named Imamuddin entered the palace with a unit of soldiers to arrest Daoud. The president refused to go with them and fired a pistol at the soldiers. The soldiers responded by killing both Daoud and Naim. In addition, the Defense Minister of Daoud's cabinet Ghulam Haidar Rasuli, Interior Minister Abdul Qadir Nuristani, and Vice President Sayyid Abdulillah were also killed.

Other family members and close relatives of Daoud, including included women and children, were also killed at the presidential palace. Daoud had earlier ordered them to be brought to the palace from their homes in the city for their safety as soon as he was informed of the emergence of a crisis situation in Kabul earlier that day.

The coup marked the end of power of the Barakzai dynasty after 152 years.

=== Speculated Soviet involvement ===
There was speculation that the Soviet Union was behind the coup, but no convincing evidence to support this ever appeared. Soviet military advisors in Kabul had been informed about the coup several hours before it began. However, (based on the current state of knowledge as of 2024) they were not involved in the planning and the Soviet leadership was surprised by the events. According to Deputy Foreign Minister Georgy Korniyenko, the Soviet leadership was informed about the coup through a statement by the Reuters news agency. The Soviet news agency TASS used the term "military coup" in its report, which would most likely have been called a "popular revolution" if the Soviets stood behind the coup. Political scientist William Maley has noted that while the Soviets were not directly involved, rising tensions with Daoud may have prompted them to refrain from taking steps to prevent an Afghan communist coup.

State Department analysts told U.S. President Jimmy Carter that direct Soviet involvement in the coup was unlikely: "Although they had probably become somewhat disillusioned with President Daoud, we do not think they would have tried to take over this important non-aligned country."

One year before Lieutenant General Shahnawaz Tanai's death, in 2021, he admitted that the coup was done without Soviet assistance in the documentary "Afghanistan: The Wounded Land". In 1997, during his residency in Tashkent, General Nabi Azimi additionally admitted the same thing and attempted to debunk claims of Soviet involvement in the coup, notably from Ahmad Shah Massoud's brother and various Afghan writers.

== Aftermath and PDPA government ==
Saur Revolution is [the] continuation of [the] Great October Revolution

— Hafizullah Amin, quoted by Kabul times on November 7, 1978

The revolution was initially welcomed by many people in Kabul, who were dissatisfied with the Daoud government. Shortly after the coup, the American Embassy in Kabul told Washington: "The Russians have finally won the great game". Before the civilian government was established, Afghan Air Force colonel Abdul Qadir and the PDPA Revolutionary Council led the country for three days from 27 April 1978. Eventually, a civilian government under the leadership of Nur Muhammad Taraki of the Khalq faction was formed, with the 455th Commando Battalion and 242nd Parachute Battalion being merged to create the 26th Airborne Regiment. In Kabul, the initial cabinet appeared to be carefully constructed to alternate ranking positions between Khalqists and Parchamites. Taraki (a Khalqist) was Prime Minister, Karmal (a Parchamite) was senior Deputy Prime Minister, and Hafizullah Amin (a Khalqist) was foreign minister. The unity between Khalq and Parcham was only brief: Amin and General Mohammad Aslam Watanjar conveyed in a meeting that the revolution was the work of Khalq and that Parcham had no part of it. Taraki and Amin in early July relieved most of the Parchamites from their government positions. Karmal was sent abroad as Ambassador to Czechoslovakia. In August 1978, Taraki and Amin claimed to have uncovered a plot and executed or imprisoned several cabinet members, even imprisoning General Abdul Qadir, the military leader of the Saur Revolution until the Soviet invasion and subsequent change in leadership in late 1979. In September 1979, it was Taraki's turn to become a victim of the Revolution, as Amin overthrew and executed him.

In private conversations, Taraki told the Soviet ambassador Alexander Puzanov that Afghanistan would follow Marxism–Leninism. The Soviet Union was the PDPA's model for modernizing Afghanistan and Taraki and Karmal were Soviet agents since the 1950s. The PDPA's party constitution leaked in 1978 explicitly mentioned Marxism–Leninism as the future of Afghanistan and by the end of 1978, Amin declared the Saur revolution as the "continuation of [the] Great October Revolution", leaving no doubts about the PDPA's orientation.

=== Economic reforms ===
At first the new government had a moderate approach and reforms were not strongly felt; however from late October the PDPA launched drastic reforms that struck the socioeconomic tribal structure of rural Afghanistan. In a "disastrous symbolic move", it changed the national flag from the traditional black, red and Islamic green color to a near-copy of the red flag of the Soviet Union, a provocative affront to the people of the conservative country. It prohibited usury, without having in place any alternative for peasants who relied on the traditional, if exploitative, credit system in the countryside. That led to an agricultural crisis and a fall in agricultural production. Such reforms were abruptly introduced and enforced, without preliminary pilots. Land reform was criticized by one journalist as "confiscating land in a haphazard manner that enraged everyone, benefited no one, and reduced food production", and the "first instance of organized, nationwide repression in Afghanistan's modern history."

=== Women's rights ===
The PDPA, an advocate of equal rights for women, declared the equality of the sexes. The PDPA made a number of statements on women's rights, declaring equality of the sexes and introduced women to political life. A prominent example was Anahita Ratebzad, who was a major Marxist–Leninist leader and a member of the Revolutionary Council. Ratebzad wrote the famous 28 May 1978 New Kabul Times editorial, which declared: "Privileges which women, by right, must have are equal education, job security, health services, and free time to rear a healthy generation for building the future of the country ... Educating and enlightening women is now the subject of close government attention." Women were already guaranteed freedoms under the 1964 Constitution, but the PDPA went further by declaring full equality.

== Repression and rising tensions: 1978–1979 ==
"We only need one million people to make the revolution. It doesn't matter what happens to the rest. We need the land, not the people."

— Announcement from Khalqist radio-broadcast after the 1978 April coup in Afghanistan

Following the April coup, Khalqists also introduced severe repression of a kind previously unknown in Afghanistan. Khalqist chief Taraki was a hardline Leninist who advocated the implementation of a campaign modelled after the Bolshevik "Red Terror" to impose Marxist policies in Afghanistan. Influenced by the practices of the Russian Bolsheviks, the PDPA regime launched a vicious crackdown across the country; arresting, torturing and killing tens of thousands of people, implementing a strategy of "killing the population into submission". When Soviet diplomat Alexander Puzhanov requested him to not kill two fighters affiliated with the Parcham, Taraki responded:

"Lenin taught us to be merciless towards the enemies of the revolution, and millions of people had to be eliminated in order to secure the victory of the October Revolution."

According to journalist and CNAS member Robert D. Kaplan, while Afghanistan had historically been extremely poor and underdeveloped, it was a "civilized" country that "had never known very much political repression" until 1978. Political scientist Barnett Rubin wrote, "Khalq used mass arrests, torture, and secret executions on a scale Afghanistan had not seen since the time of Abdul Rahman Khan, and probably not even then".

The soldiers' knock on the door in the middle of the night, so common in many Arab and African countries, was little known in Afghanistan, where a central government simply lacked the power to enforce its will outside of Kabul. Taraki's coup changed all that. Between April 1978 and the Soviet invasion of December 1979, Afghan communists executed 27,000 political prisoners at the sprawling Pul-i-Charki prison six miles east of Kabul. Many of the victims were village mullahs and headmen who were obstructing the modernization and secularization of the intensely religious Afghan countryside. By Western standards, this was a salutary idea in the abstract. But it was carried out in such a violent way that it alarmed even the Soviets.

— Robert D. Kaplan, Soldiers of God: With Islamic Warriors in Afghanistan and Pakistan,

Kaplan stated that it was the Saur Revolution and its harsh land reform program, rather than the December 1979 Soviet invasion "as most people in the West suppose", that "ignited" the mujahideen revolt against the Kabul authorities and prompted the refugee exodus to Pakistan. According to scholar Gilles Dorronsoro, it was the violence of the state rather than its reforms that caused the uprisings. The communists violently imposed PDPA policies across the villages of Afghanistan, perpetrating mass rapes of Afghan women, killing religious clerics and village chiefs, looting houses, stealing food supplies and torturing captives.

According to an Afghan "kill list" translated into English by the Netherlands Prosecution Service, the Khalq regime arrested and executed Afghan citizens accused of being Maoist, being a member of Afghanistan's Maoist movement Shola-e Javid, expressing support for Ruhollah Khomeini, purchasing arms and munition, being part of the Afghan Social Democratic Party (Afghan Mellat Party which was banned after the Saur Revolution), being part of Settam-e-Melli, fuelling sectarianism, distributing pamphlets, creating anti-government propaganda and deserting from the Afghan Armed Forces.

The viciousness and severity of the Khalqist red terror campaign disturbed the Soviet government, which was attempting to turn Afghanistan into a Soviet satellite state under Taraki. In response to Soviet disagreements with the radicalism of the Khalq, Hafizullah Amin, general secretary of the PDPA, stated: "Comrade Stalin showed us how to build socialism in a backward country."

The majority of the citizens who were captured by the PDPA regime were labelled by the communists as Ikhwanites, with others being early members of the mujahideen. Army officers, soldiers and commandos who were involved in or had connections to the Bala Hissar uprising were also arrested or executed by the Khalq. One Afghan citizen was even arrested for having a white flag with the words "Allahu Akbar" on it.

Others were arrested/executed for various coup attempt plots such as the "Rasul Jan" plot, the "J. Maiwand" plot, the "14 Assad 1358" plot and the "22.7.1979" plot which were foiled by the Khalq. Some Afghan citizens managed to avoid being executed due to a pledge or for proving their innocence. The Khalq also executed those accused of being spies for Pakistan.

A main component of the PDPA program was land confiscation and distribution; which was fiercely opposed in the rural regions. As soon as PDPA began imposing its socio-economic agenda, anti-communist revolts erupted across the countryside. Between April 1978 and the assassination of Taraki in October 1979, Khalqists murdered more than 50,000 Afghans during their campaign of "red terror". During this period, more than 27,000 people were killed by the Khalqist regime in the notorious Pul-e-Charkhi prison alone. Those killed in the campaign included landowners, religious clerics, Islamists, political dissidents, intellectuals, former bureaucrats of the Republic of Afghanistan, and any alleged critics of PDPA regime's ruthless policies.

=== Crackdown on the Barakzai royal family ===
Alongside the killing of most of Daoud's family during the coup, other members of the former Barakzai dynasty were jailed. All royal property were seized, members were deprived of Afghan citizenship, and the flow of money to the exiled King Mohammad Zahir Shah and his wife Humaira Begum in Italy were halted.

The Khalqists compiled a list of royal people to be executed after the coup. Prince Ali Abdul Seraj, a great-grandson of the 19th century emir Abdur Rahman Khan, was on the list and managed to flee Afghanistan with his wife and child while disguised as a hippie, joining a bus full of British and Australian hashish smokers.

== Armed resistance ==
For months, the Khalqist regime violently imposed its socialist programme and was brutal in its repression of opposition, arresting many without charge. The regime alienated a wide variety of people, including tribal and clan leaders, Islamists, Maoists, Western-educated teachers, and traditional religious leaders, all becoming victims of the Khalqists. Discontent fomented amongst the people of Afghanistan, and the first anti-government revolts began in Kunar Province, in October 1978. With regime brutality only increasing, and several uprisings the following year (most notably that in Herat) leaving most provinces in the country under guerrilla control, Soviet Union invaded Afghanistan in December 1979, citing the Brezhnev Doctrine as basis of its military invasion. Insurgent groups fought Soviet troops and the PDPA government for more than nine years until the final withdrawal of Soviet troops from Afghanistan in 1989.

== Reception ==
Robert D. Kaplan described the Khalqist red terror campaign as "the first instance of organized nationwide repression in Afghanistan's modern history". In 1991, PDPA member Babrak Karmal, who headed the Parcham faction and served as president after the Soviet invasion, denounced the Saur Revolution:

"It was the greatest crime against the people of Afghanistan. Parcham's leaders were against armed actions because the country was not ready for a revolution... I knew that people would not support us if we decided to keep power without such support."

== See also ==
- Haqiqat-e Inquilab-e Saur, a newspaper named after the Saur Revolution
- Afghanistan–Soviet Union relations
