= Armed Forces of the Democratic Republic of Afghanistan =

Afghanistan's military from 1978 to 1992

Armed Forces of the Democratic Republic of Afghanistan (1978–1987) د افغانستان د لوی انتخاباتي جمهوريت مسلحې ځواک (Pashto) قوای مسلح جمهوری دموکراتیک افغانستان (Dari) Armed Forces of the Republic of Afghanistan (1987–1992) د افغانستان د جمهوري ریاست وسله وال ځواکونه (Pashto) قوای مسلح جمهوری افغانستان (Dari)
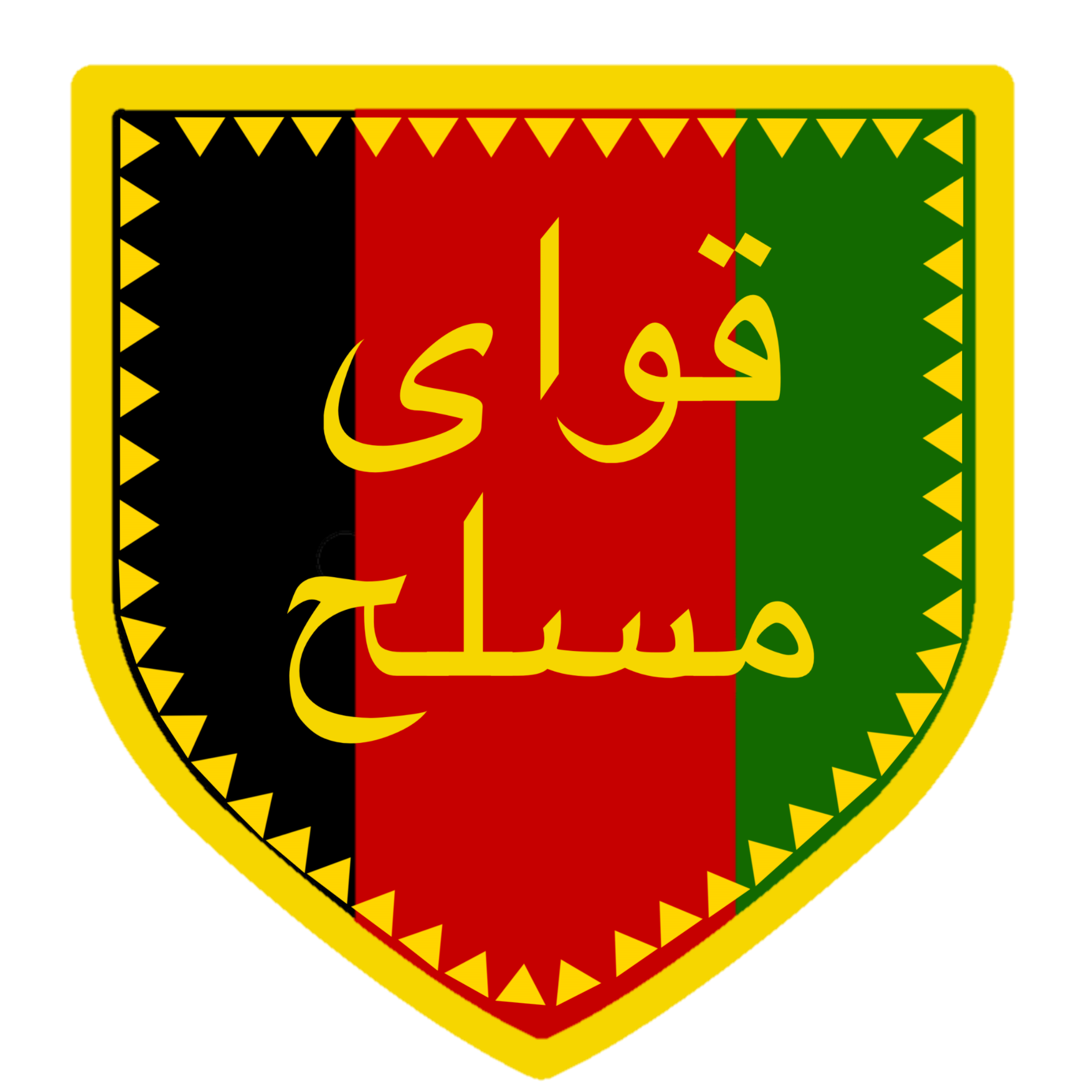
- Shoulder patch of the Afghan Army (قوای مسلح, lit. 'Armed Forces'), 1978–1992
- Motto: وطن یا کفن (Watan ya Kaffan; "Country or the Shroud") سر ورکوو٬ سنګر نه ورکوو (Sar Warkawoo, Sangar ne Warkawoo; "Sacrifice our Heads, but not our Trench")
- Founded: April 1978; 48 years ago
- Disbanded: April 1992; 34 years ago
- Service branches: Afghan Army; Commando Forces; Afghan Air Force
- Headquarters: Ministry of Defense, Kabul

Leadership
- Commander-in-Chief: Nur Muhammad Taraki (1978); Hafizullah Amin (1978–1979); Babrak Karmal (1979–1986); Mohammad Najibullah (1986–1992)
- Minister of Defence: Abdul Qadir (1978; 1982–1984); Aslam Watanjar (1979; 1990–1992); Mohammed Rafie (1979–1982; 1986–1988); Nazar Mohammad (1984–1986); Shahnawaz Tanai (1988–1990)
- Chief of Staff: Aslam Watanjar (1978–1979); Mohammed Yakub (1979–1979); Gul Aqa; Baba Jan Zahid (?–1984); Nazar Mohammad (1984–1984); Shahnawaz Tanai (1984–1990); Mohammed Asif Delawar (1990–1992)

Personnel
- Military age: 18–40 (raised to 20–45 in 1981)
- Conscription: Yes
- Active personnel: 320,000
- Reserve personnel: 100,000

Industry
- Domestic suppliers: AFSORT (Afghan–Soviet Transport Company), Kabul; Spinzar Cotton Company, Kunduz
- Foreign suppliers: Soviet Union; Czechoslovakia; East Germany; Bulgaria

Related articles
- History: 1979 uprisings in Afghanistan; 1979 Herat uprising; 1979 Hazara Uprising; Chindawol uprising; Bala Hissar uprising; Soviet–Afghan War; Operation Baikal-79; Storm-333; 1980 student protests in Kabul; Dehrawud Offensive (1984); Sorubay Assault (1985); Afghan Civil War (1989–1992); Battle of Jalalabad (1989); SCUD attacks in Pakistan; 1990 Afghan coup attempt
- Ranks: Military ranks of Afghanistan

The Armed Forces of the Democratic Republic of Afghanistan, known as the Armed Forces of the Republic of Afghanistan after 1986, was the national military of Afghanistan from 1978 to 1992.

== History ==
=== Formation of the Afghan National Guard ===
The Guard Regiments of the Afghan Army were established in the 1970s, under Daoud Khan and were disbanded in 1978-79 to strengthen the 8th Division’s new brigades. In 1978, the Afghan Army had its own Republican Guard Brigade, which was part of the Afghan Army under the Republic of Afghanistan. After the Saur Revolution, a violent Marxist–Leninist coup orchestrated by the People's Democratic Party of Afghanistan in 1978, the brigade remained as part of the army. The Republican Guard Brigade was present during the Saur Revolution Flag Raising Ceremony in 1978, alongside President Nur Muhammad Taraki and Hafizullah Amin, donning Stahlhelms from the old regime with red bands, and holding the Republican-era flag of the Afghan Army. In 1983-84, the Guard Regiments were reformed due to growth in military strength during the tenure of Babrak Karmal.

Flag of the Afghan Army in 1974, used until 1980

In 1978, the Presidential Guard Brigade was also referred to as the 21st Guard Regiment until 1988. The 44th Guards Regiment was identified in 1979, though it may have undergoing reformation. The 22nd Guard Regiment was also present during the Second Battle of Zhawar. The brigade had various roles, such as performing ceremonial duties like military funerals, protecting monuments and the Arg Presidential Palace, and serving as guards of honour and the Presidential Guard. Additionally, the Presidential Guard and the Soviet VDV were often together near the Arg and were photographed in a “Soviet-Afghan Friendship Room”.

During the early months of Babrak Karmal’s presidency, the Presidential Guard were given a different style of uniform by April 1980, compared to the usual Afghan military dress uniform. They had their own distinct sleeve patches and cap badges, instead of the Parcham emblem worn by every branch in the Afghan Armed Forces. Both the patch and the cap badge featured the iconography of a sword going through a horse shoe, surrounded by golden wheat, making the Presidential Guard distinct from servicemen in other branches. These uniforms were temporarily used during the Transitional Islamic State of Afghanistan. The Presidential Guard also carried sabres for military parades, as well as Mosin–Nagant rifles with bayonets fixed to them when standing guard on parade grounds, all for ceremonial purposes.

The emblem of the Afghan National Guard’s 21st Guard Regiment, until 1992

The Presidential Guard Brigade became part of the Guards Corps established in 1988, later renamed to Special Guard, or Gard-e-Khas, along with the 22nd and 44th Guard Regiment. The name was later changed to the Afghan National Guard, or Gard-e-Mili, which consisted of the 88th Heavy Artillery Regiment and 1st Motorized Infantry Brigade, both of which also fought in Jalalabad. As a result of the disbandment of the Afghan Air Assault Brigades, the 37th and 38th Commando Battalion also became part of the National Guard, according to Urban. However, this is disputed, as Conroy states that the 37th and 38th Commando Battalion did not join the National Guard, but rather maintaining their independence and were sent to Bala Hissar Fortress. By 1988, the Afghan National Guard had approximately 14,000 officers and personnel organised into two divisions, three infantry brigades, an artillery battalion, a SCUD battalion, and various other units, all equipped with modern weapons and equipment. The force was headquartered at Bala Hissar Fort, significantly enhancing its defensive presence.

=== Mass killings of DRA military personnel ===
In 2005, Afghan Interior Minister Yousuf Stanizai issued a statement that a burial site had been found in the province of Paktia, containing the bodies of 530 soldiers from the DRA army who were executed after surrendering to Mujahideen forces in the area. This was soon followed by the discovery of another burial site in the same area, which contained over 1,000 bodies of DRA soldiers and officers.

According to the province's governor at the time, the burial sites contained soldiers of the Afghan Army's 9th Brigade, identified by the remains of their military uniforms. These soldiers were killed by fighters belonging to Afghan mujahideen field commanders after the brigade had been disbanded.

In 1985, during the Panjshir offensives, corpses of Afghan Army troops, as well as the corpses of PDPA party members, ordinary people, and parents who allowed their sons to join the Afghan Armed Forces, were discovered by the Soviet Army and detachments of Afghan paratroopers in Panjshir, more specifically in the “Safed-Chi” gorge. The corpses were subsequently dragged out and laid in straight lines after their discovery. Kabul National TV and Soviet media from the State Television and Radio Fund claimed that these soldiers and civilians were initially prisoners who were dragged down the stairs in the area before being locked in underground prisons, tortured, and denied food and water before being executed by the Mujahideen in Panjshir. An Afghan paratrooper interviewed at the site of the massacre claimed that 264 people died in the killings perpetrated by Jamiat-e Islami altogether.

== Structure ==
On 9 January 1980, a law on universal conscription was adopted, allowing the government to draft men aged 20 to 40 years old into the army. Subsequently, the law was amended.

The Armed Forces of the Democratic Republic of Afghanistan included:

- Ministry of Defense
  - Afghan Army
  - Afghan Air Force and Air Defense
  - Afghan Border Troops
    - Moved to the Ministry of Tribal Affairs in 1983, reverted back to MoD control
  - Military educational institutions
- KhAD
  - Special/National Guard
  - KhAD Special Forces Battalions (attached to every province in Afghanistan)
    - 904th Battalion

However, it is reported that KhAD-i-Nezami was the military intelligence branch of the Afghan Army, separate from KhAD.

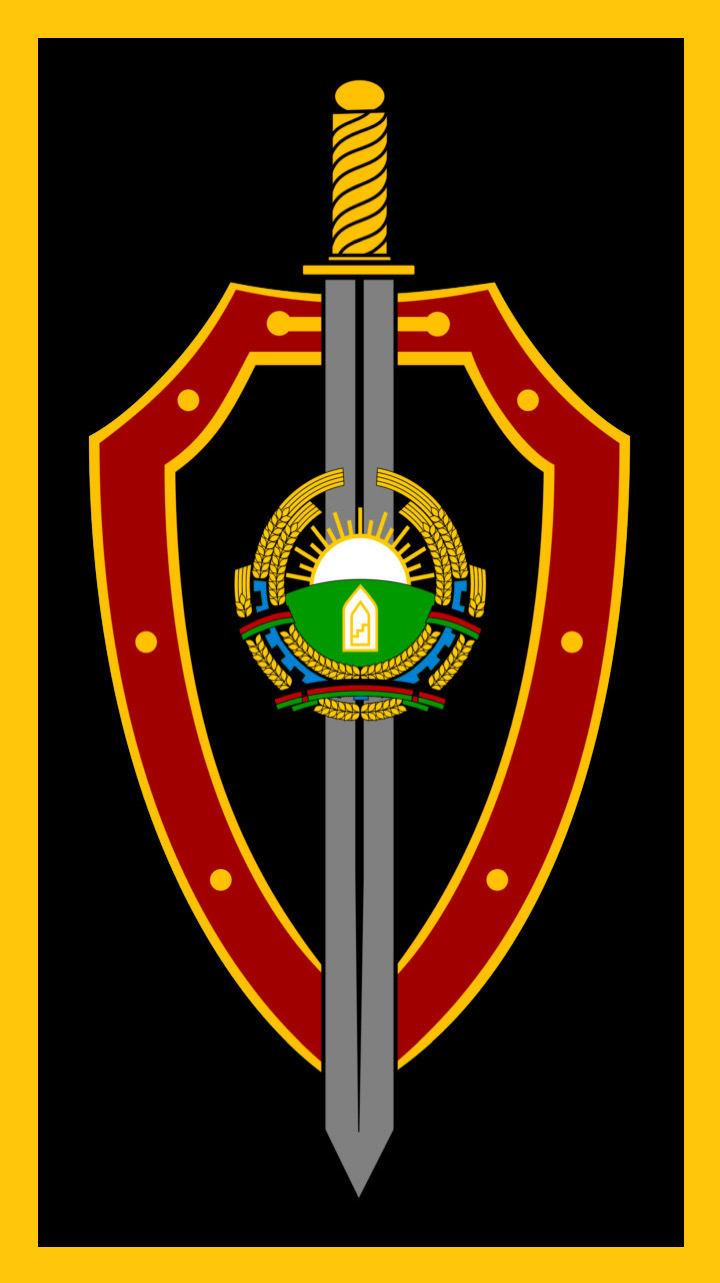
Black patch of the KhAD in 1987

- Armed formations of the Ministry of Interior (Sarandoy)
- Civil defense detachments
  - Revolution Defense Groups
  - Defense of the Revolution (1978-1979)
  - Pader Watan
  - Local Self-Defense Militias

Creation and staffing of civil defense detachments were carried out on a territorial basis. In comparison to the Afghan Army, these civil defense detachments were equipped with older WW II-era surplus weapons, especially during the early part of the war, such as the PPSh-41. The first rural self-defense units were created in April–May 1980, in the Surkh-Rōd District of Nangarhar Province by residents of the villages of Hatyrkhel, Ibrahimkhel and Umarkhel.

In the summer of 1980, the creation of other units began. In December 1983, the unification of territorial self-defense units into a civil defense system began. The Afghan Border Guard additionally had their own anthem.

=== Army Corps ===
In 1978, the 1st Army Corps, also referred to as the Central Corps, was stationed in Kabul. The 2nd Army Corps was stationed in Kandahar, and the 3rd Army Corps was stationed in Gardez. By the spring of 1992, the Afghan Army consisted of six corps in total with the 1st now being stationed in Jalalabad, the 4th stationed in Herat, the 5th in Charikar, and the 6th Corps at Kunduz.

All three corps of the Afghan Army had their own “Special Purpose Battalions (SpN)”, that had ties to the Intelligence Directorate of the Afghan Army (KhAD-e-Nezami). The 203rd SpN was tied to the 1st Army Corps, the 212th SpN was tied to the 3rd Army Corps, and the 230th SpN was tied to the 2nd Army Corps. SpN operators took part in the Marmoul offensives alongside the KGB Border Guard, the Battles of Zhawar, and Operation Magistral. Mark Urban referred to the SpN as “Reconnaissance Battalions”. It is unlikely that the three newer corps had their own Special Purpose Battalions during the spring of 1992, due to the government nearing complete collapse.

=== Infantry divisions ===
The Afghan Army had 13 infantry divisions, with two separate divisions, such as:

- 2nd Infantry Division (Parwan)
  - 64th Regiment (Panjshir)
  - 10th Brigade (Panjshir)
  - 444th Commando Battalion (Panjshir)
- 7th Infantry Division (Kabul)
  - 65th Brigade South Kabul, Kandahar-Ghazni highway
- 8th Infantry Division (Kabul in 1979, Bagram in 1986, Qergha in 1988)
  - 4th Regiment (Kabul)
  - 5th Regiment (Kabul)
  - 72nd Brigade (Kabul)
- 9th Infantry Division (Asadabad, Kunar)
  - 31st Mountain Brigade (Asmar)
  - 55th Brigade (Barikot)
  - 69th Brigade (Chugha Serai)
  - 46th Artillery Regiment (Chugha Serai)
- 11th Infantry Division (Jalalabad)
  - 32nd Brigade (Jalalabad)
  - 81st Brigade (Hadda)
  - 71st Brigade (Ghanikhel)
  - 91st Artillery Regiment (Jalalabad)
  - 211th Separate Special Forces Battalion
  - 61st Separate Infantry Division
- 12th Infantry Division (Gardez)
  - 67th Brigade (Gardez)
  - 36th Regiment (Jaji)
  - 22nd Guard Brigade
  - 15th Brigade (Urgun)
- 14th Infantry Division (Ghazni)
  - 3rd Brigade (Ghazni)
  - Unknown regiment (Bamiyan)
  - 40th Regiment (Paktia)
- 15th Infantry Division (Kandahar)
  - 36th Brigade (Kandahar)
  - 43rd Mountain Regiment (Zabul)
  - Unknown brigade (Girishk, Helmand)
- 17th Infantry Division (Herat)
  - 28th Brigade (Herat)
  - 33rd Brigade (Qala-Yi-Naw, Badghis)
  - 2nd Regiment (Chakhcharan, Ghor)

Reportedly, the 17th Division was sent to halt the 1979 Herat uprising, but due to the lack of Khalq party members in the division, they mutinied.

- 18th Infantry Division (Mazar-i-Sharif)
  - 62nd Mechanised Regiment (Mazar-i-Sharif)
  - 35th Regiment (Sheberghan, Faryab)
  - Unknown mountain battalion (Mazar-i-Sharif)
- 19th Infantry Division (Faizabad, Badakhshan, 1986)
- 20th Infantry Division (Nahrin, Baghlan)
  - 23rd Brigade (Baghlan)
  - 75th Brigade (Iskhamish, Takhar)
- 25th Infantry Division (Khost, Paktia)
  - 19th Brigade (Khost)
  - 59th Brigade (Nadir Shah Kot)
  - 23rd Brigade (Khost)
  - 6th Artillery Regiment

Under the Presidency of Mohammad Najibullah in 1988, several new divisions were formed from local pro-government militia formations, such as the 53rd Infantry Division (also known as the “Jowzjani” militia) led by Abdul Rashid Dostum and a division in either Helmand or Kandahar led by Abdul Jabar Qahraman. These new divisions were the:

- 55th Division
- 80th Division
- 93rd Division
- 94th Division
- 95th Division
- 96th Division

Additionally, there could have been a possible division in Lashkar-Gah, Helmand Province.

=== Brigades ===
The Armed Forces of the DRA had 22 brigades altogether, consisting of combined arms, tank, artillery, and commando brigades; a Republican guard brigade in 1978 (which became part of the Afghan National Guard in 1988); and an air defense brigade, border, and army logistics brigades.

=== Commando Brigades ===
The Afghan Commando Brigades were attached to the Afghan Army. Some were under the control of KhAD-i-Nezami (the Afghan Army’s military intelligence wing), having airborne assault capabilities until 1988, just before the Soviet withdrawal from Afghanistan.

- 37th Commando Battalion (Kabul, 1986)
  - Formerly the 26th Airborne Regiment
- 38th Commando Battalion (Parwan, 1986)
- 200th Reconnaissance Battalion
- 201st Commando Battalion
- 444th Commando Battalion (Kabul, 1979, Panjshir, 1986)
- 666th Commando Battalion (Paktia, 1986)
- 665th Commando Battalion (Kandahar International Airport)
- 866th Commando Battalion (Herat)
- 466th Commando Battalion (outskirts of East Kandahar)
- 84th Commando Battalion (formed in 1987)
- 85th Commando Battalion (formed in 1987)
- A possible 344th Commando Battalion in 1980
- 625th Operative Battalion
- 626th Operative Battalion
- 627th Operative Battalion
- 628th Operative Battalion
- 629th Operative Battalion

The Afghan commando air assault brigades ceased operations in 1988 during the Soviet withdrawal from Afghanistan. In 1991, the 666th Commando Battalion was completely decimated during the Siege of Khost by the Mujahideen. Information on the fate of other commando battalions is unknown, but supposedly, none of them appeared on a list of surrendered units that came under the control of the mujahideen in 1992.

=== Tank brigades ===
- 4th Tank Brigade (Kabul, Pul-e-Charkhi)
- 7th Tank Brigade (Kandahar)
- 15th Tank Brigade (Kabul and Mazar-i-Sharif, 1986)
- 21st Mechanised Brigade (Farah Province)

Border Command

The Border Force of the Democratic Republic of Afghanistan initially reported to the Ministry of Frontiers and Tribes before being reverted to the Ministry of Defense. Their job was to prevent infiltration into the country, as many foreigners (such as Afghan Arabs) illegally entered Afghanistan to join the mujahideen in their fight against the Soviet Army and the Afghan Armed Forces. Prominent Arab mujahideen figures include Osama bin Laden and Abdullah Yusuf Azzam, who was potentially assassinated by KhAD. The Soviet KGB was also involved in the training and organization of the Afghan Border Forces, which were reportedly more effective than regular Afghan Army troops in protecting borders near Pakistan. The Afghan Border Forces were also involved in extensive mining of the borders, in order to prevent further infiltration.

- Ministry of Defense
  - 1st Border Brigade (Jalalabad)
  - 2nd Border Brigade (Khost)
  - 3rd Border Brigade (Badakhshan)
  - 4th Border Brigade (Nimruz)
  - 5th Border Brigade (Herat)
  - 6th Border Brigade
  - 7th Border Brigade (Kandahar)
  - 8th Border Brigade (Paktika)
  - 9th Training Border Brigade (Kabul)
  - 10th Border Brigade (Asadabad, Kunar)
  - 11th Border Brigade
  - Independent border battalions in Helmand, Farah and Baghlan

=== Motorized Infantry Brigades ===
- Afghan National Guard
  - 1st Motorized Infantry Brigade
- 9th Infantry Division
  - 55th Motorized Infantry Brigade
- 11th Infantry Division
  - 66th Motorized Infantry Brigade
  - 71st Motorized Infantry Brigade
  - 77th Motorized Infantry Brigade
  - 81st Motorized Infantry Brigade
- 55th Motorized Infantry Brigade

=== Other brigades ===
- Artillery Headquarters Brigade (Kabul)
- Abdul Jabar Qahraman’s Independent Brigade Group (1988)
- 22nd Mountain Brigade (Kabul, 1979, Paktia, 1986)
- Republican Guard Brigade (1978)

=== Regiments ===
The Afghan Armed Forces had 39 regiments comprising various types of troops, including combined arms, artillery, military engineering, sapper regiments, military communications, Air Force and Air Defense regiments, territorial troops, and rear army regiments. These are the known regiments:

- Afghan Army
  - 26th Airborne Regiment
    - Formed from the 242nd Parachute Battalion and 455th Commando Battalion
  - 717th Civil Disciplinary Regiment
- Afghan Air Force
  - 232nd Air Regiment (Kabul Airport)
  - 322nd Fighter Air Regiment (Bagram Airbase)
  - 321st Air Regiment (Bagram Airbase)
  - 335th Mixed Air Regiment (Shindand Airbase)
  - 355th Fighter-Bomber Aviation Regiment (Shindand Airbase)
  - 366th Fighter Air Regiment (Kandahar)
  - 377th Helicopter Regiment (Kabul Airport)
  - 373rd Air Transport Regiment
  - 393rd Training Air Regiment (Dehadi Airbase, Balkh)
  - Unknown Air Regiment
- Afghan Air Defense
  - 99th SAM Regiment (Kabul)
  - 92nd SAM Regiment (Kabul)
- Afghan National Guard
  - 88th Heavy Artillery Regiment
- Ministry of Interior (Sarandoy)
  - 24th Sarandoy Regiment (Badakhshan)
  - 7th Operative Regiment
- 10th Engineer-Sapper Regiment

Unknown regiments

- 25th Infantry Division
  - 1 unknown tank regiment
- 12 combined arms regiments
- 6 air defense regiments
- 11 territorial troop regiments
- 2 regiments of the rear of the army
- Unknown artillery regiments
- Unknown engineering regiments
- Unknown communication regiments

=== Separate battalions, divisions and squadrons ===
The Armed Forces of the DRA had separate battalions, divisions, and squadrons in every branch that were non-divisional, including special troops and units in the rear of the army.

- Afghan Army
  - 1st Central Army Corps Reconnaissance Battalion
  - 57th Training Regiment (Kabul)
  - 10th Engineer Regiment (Hussein Kut, Parwan)
  - 5th Transport Regiment (Siah Sang Garrison, Kabul)
  - 119th Transport Regiment (Sherpur Barracks, Kabul)
  - 52nd Independent Signals Regiment (Kabul)
  - 235th Independent Signals Regiment (Kabul)
- KhAD-i-Nezam
  - 203rd Special Purpose Battalion (SpN)
  - 212th Special Purpose Battalion (SpN)
  - 230th Special Purpose Battalion (SpN)
- Afghan National Guard
  - 21st Guards Regiment (Presidential Guard Brigade)
  - 22nd Guards Regiment
  - 44th Guards Regiment
- Afghan Air Force
  - 2 Mil-Mi24 attack helicopter squadrons in Jalalabad and Kabul
  - 373rd Air Transport
    - 12th Squadron
  - Unknown Air Regiment
    - 2 transport squadrons
    - 1 VIP squadron
- Afghan Air Defense
  - 66th AAA Battalion (Kandahar)
- 11th Infantry Division
  - 11th Tactical Ballistic Missile Battalion
  - Unknown mechanised battalion
  - Unknown Howitzer battalion
  - 211th Separate Special Forces Battalion
- 61st Separate Infantry Division
- Sarandoy
  - 12th Mountain Battalion
- KHAD
  - 904th Battalion

=== Military educational institutions ===
- Harbi University (Kabul Military University)
- Air Forces and Air Defense School
- Technical School
- Military educational institutions for the training of officers
- 29th Educational Brigade
- Higher officer courses "A"
- New technology courses
- Military lyceum
- Communications troops training centre
- Border Force training regiment
- Supply schools
- 2 additional training centres
- Military musical school

By 1985, the structure of the irregular forces had changed to include self-defense groups formed at enterprises:

- Detachments of Sarandoy formed according to the territorial principle. The first detachment in the country was created in August 1981 from 53 students of Kabul University.
- Detachments of the border militia ("malish") formed according to the tribal principle.

As General S. M. Mikhailov noted, by 1989, the Afghan army was at a fairly high level of combat capability in terms of military training of personnel, equipment, and weapons.

“What is missing is unity, this is the main problem. The second reason for the difficulties is associated with very weak work among the population, for attracting the broad masses to the side of the people's power".

== Equipment and staffing ==
Under the Democratic Republic of Afghanistan, weapons deliveries by the Soviets increased and included Mi-24 helicopters, MiG-21 fighter aircraft, ZSU-23-4 Shilka and ZSU-57-2 anti-aircraft self-propelled mounts, MT-LB armored personnel carriers, BM-27 Uragan and BM-21 Grad multiple-launch rocket systems and 9K52 Luna-M and Scud missile launchers.

On February 1, 1986, the staffing of military equipment and personnel of the Air Force and Air Defense was:

- Personnel – 19,400 people (72% of the staff)
- Aircraft – 226, of which 217 (96%) were combat-ready
- helicopters – 89, of which 62 were combat-ready

At its peak, the Afghan Air Force included:

- 90 Mikoyan-Gurevich MiG-17s
- 45 MiG-21s – in 1990, three squadrons were reported at Bagram Airfield
- 60 Su-7s and Su-17s – Issue 21 (1985) of Warplane, a British partwork, reported that some 48 Su-7BMs, without Su-7UM two-seaters, had been supplied from 1970, forming the core of two fighter/ground attack squadrons at Shindand Airbase.
- 45 Il-28s
- 150 Mil Mi-8s and Mil Mi-24s
- 40 Antonov An-26, Antonov An-24, and Antonov An-2 transport aircraft

Excluding the armed formations of Sarandoy, the armed forces numbered 160,000 people. Later Western reports indicated an active strength of around 515,000 by 1990.

Equipment:

- Tanks - 1,568
- BMP - 129
- BTR and BRDM - 1,225
- Field and rocket artillery guns, mortars – 4,880
- Vehicles – about 13,000
- Scud-B and C launchers and Missiles – 43+ Launchers, 2,000+ Missiles

There is no exact information about the number of armed formations of Sarandoy (brigades, regiments and separate battalions) in the last year of the existence of the Republic of Afghanistan. At its peak, Sarandoy had about 115,000 personnel.

Regular army units were armed with Soviet-made weapons and military equipment. Most DRA soldiers were equipped with either AKM and AK-74 assault rifles. In the early 1980s, civilian self-defense forces were equipped with older PPSh-41 submachine guns, which were phased out for more modern rifles closer to the regime's end.

The territorial self-defense units were armed mainly with light small arms, including obsolete and captured models. For example, in February 1986, the tribal militia battalion under the command of Usman-bek from Kakis-nau, which provided protection for the Sarok-Kalas-nau road in the province of Herat, had 300 fighters. Half of these fighters were armed with Kalashnikov assault rifles, and the rest with a Makarov or older Tokarev pistols. The militia also had PPSh-41 submachine guns and rifles of various systems, along with three R-104 radio stations, eleven R-105 radios, one jeep, and four trucks.

== Printed editions ==
Since April 27, 1980, the official publication of the DRA's Ministry of Defense was a newspaper titled “د سرتیري حقیقت” (Soldier's Truth). Around fifteen thousand copies were in circulation. Additionally, the Ministry of Defense had its own annual publication (in both Pashto and Dari) titled “دا اردو مجله” (The Military Magazine, also referred to as “De Revue Militaire” in French), which began in 1939 under the Kingdom of Afghanistan.

== Holidays ==
- August 19 – DRA Army Day, coinciding with Afghan Independence Day.
- April 27 – Saur Revolution Anniversary.

== Bibliography ==
- Giustozzi, Antonio (2000). War, Politics, and Society in Afghanistan. Hurst. ISBN 978-1-85065-396-7.
