= Chief of General Staff (Afghanistan) =

Head of Afghanistan's armed forces

Chief of Staff of the Islamic Emirate Armed Forces
- Dari: رئیس ستاد نیروهای مسلح افغانستان; Pashto: د افغانستان د وسله والو ځواکونو د درستیزوالۍ لوی درستیز

- Incumbent; Colonel general Fasihuddin Fitrat since 7 September 2021
- Ministry of Defense
- Reports to: Minister of Defense
- Seat: Kabul
- Appointer: Supreme Leader

The Chief of Staff of the Armed Forces (Dari: رئیس ستاد قوای مسلح افغانستان; Pashto: د افغانستان د وسله والو ځواکونو د درستیزوالۍ لوی درستیز) is the highest-ranking military officer in the military of Afghanistan (currently the Islamic Emirate Armed Forces), who is responsible for maintaining the operational command of the military.

== List of chiefs ==
Abdul Karim Mustaghni was army chief of staff until the 1973 overthrow of the monarchy. Under the rule of Hafizullah Amin, his brother in law Mohammed Yaqub served as Chief of the General Staff until being executed by Soviet-Parcham forces in December of 1979. In the late 1980s, during the communist regime, Nazar Mohammad served as army chief of staff, followed by Shahnawaz Tanai, Both from the Khalq faction of the PDPA (December 1984 – March 1990), who was succeeded by Mohammed Asif Delawar following the 1990 coup attempt, which was led by Tanai.

=== Kingdom of Afghanistan (1926–1973) ===
No.	Portrait	Name (Birth–Death)	Term of office			Defence branch	Ref.
No.	Portrait	Name (Birth–Death)	Took office	Left office	Time in office	Defence branch	Ref.
		Major general Abdul Karim Mustaghni (1911–2004)	?	1973	?	Army	

=== Republic of Afghanistan (1973–1978) ===
No.	Portrait	Name (Birth–Death)	Term of office			Defence branch	Ref.
No.	Portrait	Name (Birth–Death)	Took office	Left office	Time in office	Defence branch	Ref.
		Major general Ghulam Haidar Rasuli (1919–1978)	1975	April 1978	?	Army	

=== Democratic Republic of Afghanistan (1978–1992) ===
No.	Portrait	Name (Birth–Death)	Term of office			Defence branch	Ref.
No.	Portrait	Name (Birth–Death)	Took office	Left office	Time in office	Defence branch	Ref.
		Colonel general Mohammad Aslam Watanjar (1946–2000)	1978	1 April 1979	?	Army	
		Lieutenant general Mohammed Yakub (?–1979)	1 April 1979	27 December 1979	?	Army	
		Major general Gul Aqa	?	?	?	Army	
		Lieutenant general Baba Jan Zahid	?	January 1984	?	Army	
		Colonel general Nazar Mohammad (1935–1998)	January 1984	December 4 1984	?	Air Force	
		Lieutenant general Shahnawaz Tanai (1950–2022)	December 1984	March 1990	?	Army	
		General; Mohammed Asif Delawar	March 1990	1992	?	Army	

=== Afghan Armed Forces (Islamic Republic era) ===
No.	Portrait	Chief of General Staff	Took office	Left office	Time in office	Defence branch	Ref.
1	Bismillah Khan Mohammadi	Lieutenant general Bismillah Khan Mohammadi (born 1961)	8 March 2002	30 June 2010	8 years, 114 days	Afghan National Army	
2	Sher Mohammad Karimi	General; Sher Mohammad Karimi (born 1945)	30 June 2010	22 May 2015	4 years, 326 days	Afghan National Army	
3	Qadam Shah Shahim	General; Qadam Shah Shahim (born 1962)	22 May 2015	24 April 2017	1 year, 337 days	Afghan National Army	
4	Mohammad Sharif Yaftali	Lieutenant general Mohammad Sharif Yaftali	26 April 2017	13 March 2019	1 year, 323 days	Afghan National Army	
5	Bismillah Waziri	Lieutenant general Bismillah Waziri	13 March 2019	7 July 2020	1 year, 116 days	Afghan National Army	
6	Yasin Zia	Lieutenant general Yasin Zia	7 July 2020	19 June 2021	347 days	Afghan National Army	
7	Wali Mohammad Ahmadzai	Lieutenant general Wali Mohammad Ahmadzai	19 June 2021	11 August 2021	53 days	Afghan National Army	
8	Hebatullah Alizai	Lieutenant general Hebatullah Alizai	11 August 2021	15 August 2021	4 days	Afghan National Army	

=== Islamic Emirate Armed Forces ===
No.	Portrait	Chief of General Staff	Took office	Left office	Time in office	Defence branch	Ref.
1	Fasihuddin Fitrat	Colonel general Fasihuddin Fitrat	7 September 2021	Incumbent	5 years, 0 days*	Islamic National Army	

* Incumbent's time in office last updated: 7 September 2026.

== Bibliography ==
- Nyrop, Richard F.; Donald M. Seekins (January 1986). Area Handbook Series: Afghanistan: A Country Study. Fort Belvoir, VA: Defense Technical Information Center.
