= Sher Mohammad Karimi =

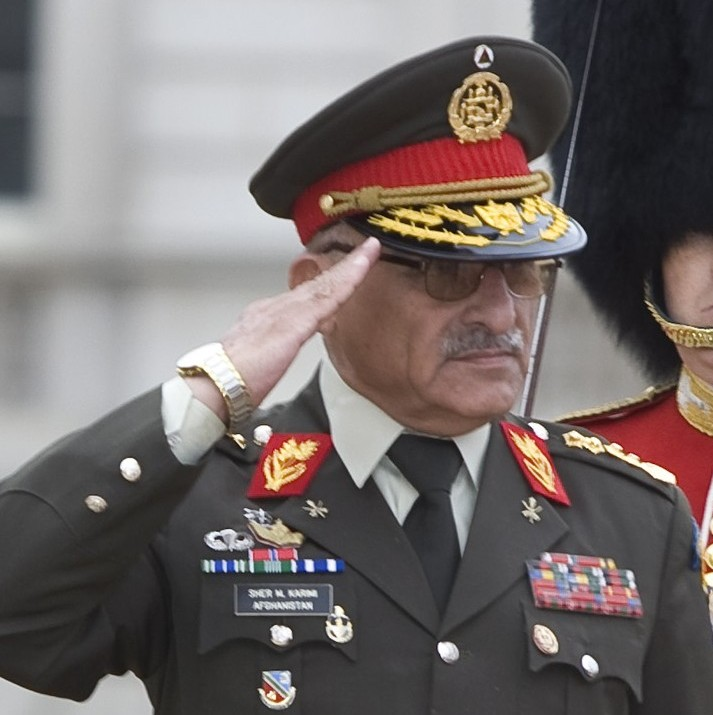
- Born: 11 November 1945 (age 80); Khost, Khost Province, Kingdom of Afghanistan
- Alma mater: Royal Military Academy Sandhurst; National Defence College, India; United States Army Command and General Staff College
- Military career
- Allegiance: Afghanistan
- Branch: Royal Afghan Army; Armed Forces of the Democratic Republic of Afghanistan; Afghan National Army
- Service years: c. 1967–2015
- Rank: General
- Commands: Chief of the General Staff
- Conflicts: Afghan conflict; War in Afghanistan
- Awards: Meritorious Service Medal

General Sher Mohammad Karimi (born 11 November 1945) is an Afghan retired military officer who last served as Chief of the General Staff of the Afghan National Army from 2010 to 2015. An ethnic Pashtun, Karimi was born in Khost Province of Afghanistan.

== Biography ==
An ethnic Pashtun, Karimi was born on 11 November 1945 in Khost Province, Kingdom of Afghanistan. He joined the Afghan Army around 1967, and attended the Royal Military Academy Sandhurst in 1968, becoming its first Afghan graduate. Karimi also graduated from the National Defence College, India, and the United States Army Command and General Staff College. In addition, before the communist takeover, he completed the qualification course of the United States Army Special Forces.

After the 1978 Saur Revolution in Afghanistan, Karimi was arrested and incarcerated by the Khalq faction of the PDPA communist party because of his Western education. He was employed as a director during Dr. Mohammad Najibullah Government in ministry of defence. Unlike many of his communist colleagues and the majority of the Afghan officer corps, Karimi had never received training in the Soviet Union. He was eventually forced into exile in Pakistan until the removal of the Taliban government in late 2001.

In 2003, Karimi returned to the country to help establish the Afghan National Army of the new U.S.-backed government. By 2006 he was serving as the ANA chief of operations, with the rank of major general. Around that time he had a critical role in the creation of the Afghan National Army Commando Corps.

Karimi returned to his special-operations roots at Fort Bragg, North Carolina in February 2010. Previously, he served as the Chief of Operations for the Afghan Ministry of Defense.

== Education ==
- National Military Academy of Afghanistan in Kabul
  - Kabul Commando Course (C) Kabulst
  - CGSC (Staff Course A) Kabul
- Royal Military Academy Sandhurst in the United Kingdom
- Fort Bragg in North Carolina
  - Infantry Advance Course, Ranger course, Special Forces Course. Airborne Course (USA)
- Counter Insurgency and Intel Courses (India)
  - NDC (India)
- Commando Course (Egypt)
- Near East and South Asia Strategic Studies. NESA.NDU (USA) Assignments:
  - Platoon Commander, Commando BN, Company Commander, XO Battalion
  - Battalion Commander
  - Adjutant Guard Brigade
  - G3 Division
  - DG2 Central Corps
  - DCS for Mobilization and Organization
  - Special Assistant to CoS and head of the Advisory Board
  - Deputy Chairman for DDR
  - G3 ANA – Chief Operations

Military offices
Preceded by Bismillah Khan Mohammadi	Chief of the General Staff of the Afghan National Army; 2010–2015	Succeeded by Qadam Shah Shahim
