= Siege of Khost =

1980–1991 siege in Afghanistan

Coordinates: 33.3331°N 69.9169°E

- Part of the Soviet–Afghan War and the Afghan Civil War (1989–1992)
- Khost (Afghanistan)
Date	1980 – March 31, 1991
Location	Khost, Khost Province, Afghanistan
Result	Afghan Mujahideen victory

Belligerents
(Afghanistan) Afghanistan; Supported by: Soviet Union (1980–1988)	Afghan Mujahideen: Hezb-e Islami Gulbuddin; Haqqani network; Harakat-i-Inqilab-i-Islami; Local Ahmadzai tribes; Wahhabion; Al-Qaeda; Afghan Interim Government (from 1988); Hezb-e Islami Gulbuddin (until July 1989); Harakat-i Inqilab-i Islami; Pakistan

Commanders and leaders
(Afghanistan) Mohammed Rafie (Afghanistan) Abdul Qadir (Afghanistan) Shahnawaz Tanai (Afghanistan) Mohammad Aslam Watanjar (Afghanistan) Abdul Rashid Dostum (Afghanistan) Nazar Mohammed (Afghanistan) Mohammed Asif Delawar (Soviet Union) Sergei Sokolov (Soviet Union) Valentin Varennikov (Soviet Union) Boris Gromov	Jalaluddin Haqqani; Mohammad Nabi Mohammadi; Gulbuddin Hekmatyar; Ibrahim Umari Haqqani

The eleven-year siege of Khost took place throughout the nine-year Soviet–Afghan War in the 1980s and the subsequent Afghan civil war in the 1990s. Its airstrip's 3 km runway served as a base for helicopter operations by Soviet forces.

It began soon after the invasion of Afghanistan by Soviet troops, when Afghan guerillas took control of the only land route between Khost and Gardez, effectively putting a stop to the Soviet advance.

At the end of July 1983, the forces of Jalaluddin Haqqani laid siege to two towns in Khost, and the Tani, Mangal, Zazai and Waziri tribes began taking an active part in the fighting, despite being passive up until then. All of the aforementioned events coincided with former King Mohammed Zahir Shah's appeal for a united front, which caused rumours about the Royalists intending to establish a provisional government in a liberated Khost. However, Khost was not captured and by October, the Tani tribe had withdrawn from coalition due to a tribal rivalry with the Zadran. Many rebels also returned home as winter came on. By the end of December, government forces arriving from Gardez ended the siege of the two towns and recaptured Zazi Maidan.

Operation Magistral was an offensive launched to relieve it at the end of 1987. The first convoys reached Khost at the end of December 1987. When the main Soviet force withdrew, mujahideen groups cut off Khost once again, as they had done since 1981.

Following the creation of the Commander's Shura, which united the Peshawar Seven, an assault was coordinated to capture Khost, an assault which at least according to former special envoy to the mujahideen Peter Tomsen was more an Inter-Services Intelligence (ISI) operation than a mujahideen one. This fighting was a coordinated attack by the forces of Hezb-e Islami of Gulbuddin Hekmatyar, Jalaluddin Haqqani and local Ahmadzai tribes led by Mohammad Nabi Mohammadi. The Ahmadzai were able to spearhead the assault after Hezb-e Islam and Haqqania suffered setbacks, and eventually captured the city and negotiated the surrender of the garrison, resulting in victory on March 31, 1991.
