= Mohammed Yakub =

Chief of General Staff and Lieutenant colonel in the Afghan Army

Mohammed Yaqub
- محمد یعقوب

Chief of General Staff
- In office 1 April 1979 – 27 December 1979
- President: Hafizullah Amin
- Preceded by: Mohammad Aslam Watanjar

Personal details
- Born: Unknown Afghanistan?
- Died: 27 December 1979 Tajbeg Palace, Kabul, Democratic Republic of Afghanistan
- Political party: People's Democratic Party of Afghanistan
- Spouse: Sister of Hafizullah Amin
- Education: Ryazan Higher Airborne Command School
- Awards: First-Class Paratrooper Badge

Military service
- Allegiance: Democratic Republic of Afghanistan
- Branch/service: Afghan National Army
- Rank: Lieutenant Colonel
- Unit: 444th Commando Battalion
- Commands: 180 Presidential Palace Guards
- Battles/wars: Saur Revolution; Tajbeg Palace assault †

Mohammed Yaqub (? – 27 December 1979) was a lieutenant colonel in the Afghan Army, the Chief of General Staff of the Democratic Republic of Afghanistan from 1 April 1979, until his death during the Tajbeg Palace assault on 27 December 1979, and a “first-class” paratrooper of the 444th Commando Battalion.

== Personal life ==
Not much information is available on Mohammed Yaqub's personal life, although he was a known member of the People's Democratic Party of Afghanistan in the Khalq faction and knew Russian fluently, as a result of his time in the Soviet Union. Due to his alignment in the party, he was very close to Hafizullah Amin, president of the Democratic Republic of Afghanistan in 1979, and was married to one of Amin's sisters. Many details about Mohammed Yaqub's life are unknown, despite his prominence in the military and political scene of Afghanistan as the Chief of General Staff, being the husband of Amin's sister and being a participant of the Saur Revolution in April 1978.

== Military career ==
Yaqub was a graduate of the Ryazan Higher Airborne Command School and a commando school in the USSR, therefore qualifying him to become a paratrooper of the 444th Commando Battalion. He wore “first class” jump wings, adorning three stars, meaning he was equivalent to a master paratrooper. He was involved in the Saur Revolution, alongside other Khalqist officers and army personnel, overthrowing the Republican government of President Mohammad Daoud Khan. After the coup, he commanded the elite Afghan Presidential Guard, sometimes referred to as the Afghan Republican Guard, holding the rank of a Major. On 1 April 1979, Yaqub replaced Mohammad Aslam Watanjar as the Chief of General Staff and was promoted to the rank of Lieutenant Colonel, with Watanjar becoming the Minister of Defence. As most Afghan Army officers were Parchamites, they were answerable to Watanjar, who was also a Parchamite. As a result of these changes in military posts, a compromise would have to be found as Nur Muhammad Taraki was supported by Watanjar, whereas Hafizullah Amin relied on the support of Yaqub. However, in June 1979, Amin would become the Minister of National Defense and thus the military was in the hands of both Yaqub and Amin.

Mohammed Yaqub led units of the Afghan Army who were loyal to Hafizullah Amin, which eventually resulted in Taraki and his supporters from being removed from power on 14 September 1979. On October 23, 1979, Yaqub would be elected as a member of the Central Committee of the People's Democratic Party of Afghanistan. In the book “Secret Commander” by Colonel General Yuri Vladimirovich Tukharinov, Yaqub is described as a “strong-willed” and “decisive” military commander.

Tall, athletic figure, a beautiful, strong-willed face and a penetrating gaze, he had enormous energy and efficiency. He was fanatically devoted to Hafizullah Amin. He constantly maintained contact with division commanders who obeyed unquestioningly to him.

— Colonel General Merimsky Viktor Arkadievich

In a book written by “Ivanova”, a Soviet soldier who participated in the Soviet–Afghan War, it was argued that only two people in Afghanistan could create obstacles for a Parchamite regime change in the country before the introduction of Soviet troops; Hafizullah Amin and Mohammed Yaqub. According to Ivanova, the chief military adviser of the USSR in Afghanistan, Colonel General Soltan Kekkezovich Magometov met with Yaqub and enquired if he would stay loyal to Amin under any circumstances. Yaqub replied that he would remain loyal to Amin.

== Death ==
On 27 December 1979, Mohammed Yaqub would be killed during the Tajbeg Palace assault. There are various accounts of how he died, with Ivanova's book claiming several Soviet VDV paratroopers met the Chief of General Staff to negotiate the deployment of Soviet troops into the Afghan capital, Kabul, by agreement with Amin. His Soviet adviser was also in the room. According to Ivanova's interpretation of events, Yaqub received the visitors with extreme caution and only talked to them when the Afghan National Guard, the branch of the Afghan Armed Forces which protected Tajbeg Palace, were in his presence. During an attempt to arrest Yaqub, he pulled out a pistol and tried to escape through a secret door in the palace, but he was too heavily wounded. He was killed by Abdul Wakil, who was in civilian clothing, being shot five times. Gulabzoy also took part in the operation, supporting the idea of a Parcham-dominated government and previously plotting to kill Hafizullah Amin with the “gang of four”.
