= Gang of Four (Afghanistan) =

1970s political faction

The Gang of Four in the politics of Afghanistan was a Political faction of Khalqist government officials consisting of Mohammad Aslam Watanjar (Minister of Interior), Sayed Mohammad Gulabzoy (Minister of Communications), Sherjan Mazdooryar (Minister of Border Affairs), and Assadullah Sarwari (Director of State Security), who supported Nur Muhammad Taraki in his power struggle against Hafizullah Amin in 1979.
