= Mohammed Rafie =

Afghan politician and military officer (1946–2025)

Major General Mohammed Rafie HDR(A) O.R.(B)
- محمد رفیع
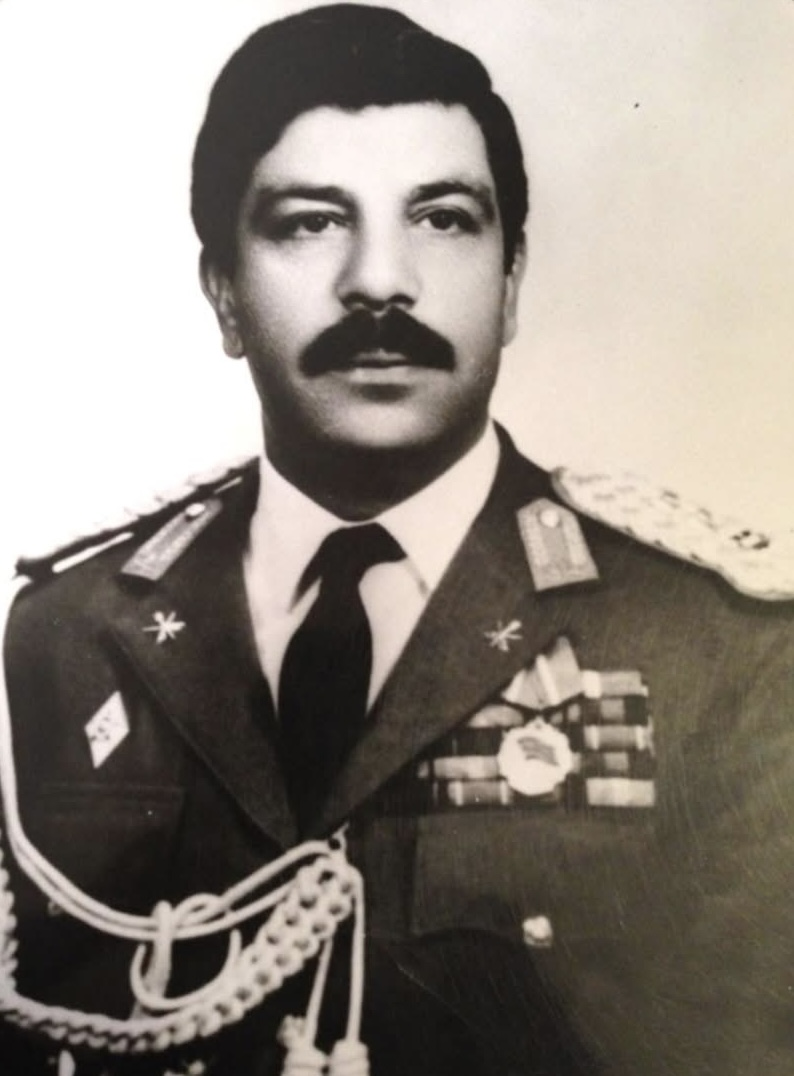
- Official portrait, c. 1984

Vice President of Afghanistan
- In office 1988–1992
- President: Mohammad Najibullah

Minister of Defence
- In office 1986–1988
- President: Mohammad Najibullah
- Preceded by: Nazar Mohammad
- Succeeded by: Shahnawaz Tanai
- In office 1979–1982
- President: Babrak Karmal
- Preceded by: Hafizullah Amin
- Succeeded by: Abdul Qadir

Minister of Public Works
- In office April 1978 – August 1978
- President: Nur Muhammad Taraki

Personal details
- Born: 1946 Paghman, Kingdom of Afghanistan
- Died: 9 November 2025 (aged 79) Germany
- Party: PDPA / Parcham (until 1990); Watan Party

Military service
- Allegiance: Kingdom of Afghanistan (1967–1973); Democratic Republic of Afghanistan (1978–1987); Republic of Afghanistan (1987–1992)
- Branch: Afghan Army
- Service years: 1967–1992
- Rank: Major General
- Conflicts: 1973 Afghan coup d'état; 1975 Panjshir Valley uprising; Saur Revolution; Soviet-Afghan War; Siege of Khost; Afghan Civil War (1989–1992)
- Awards: Hero of the Democratic Republic of Afghanistan; Order of the Red Banner; Afghan KGB Medal

Major General Mohammed Rafie (Pashto: محمد رفیع; 1946 – 9 November 2025) was an Afghan military officer and politician who served as Vice President of the Republic of Afghanistan from 1988 until the overthrow of the Homeland Party regime in 1992. He also served as Afghanistan's minister of defence during the Soviet-Afghan War.

== Early life ==
Rafie was born around 1946 to an ethnic Pashtun family in the Paghman area of Kabul. He studied at Habibia High School and graduated from the Afghan Military Academy before receiving further military training in the Soviet Union. He participated in the 1973 Afghan coup d'état which brought General Mohammad Daoud Khan into power. He became an army officer in the Afghan Army's tank corps and became commander of the Fourth Armored Division. He was appointed as the Minister of Public Works following the Saur Revolution in April 1978. In August 1978, he was ousted from his public offices by the Khalqi government and imprisoned at Pul-e-Charkhi prison under Hafizullah Amin. He was released following the Soviet invasion of Afghanistan in 1979.

Rafie was a member of the Politburo and served as Deputy Prime Minister. He served twice as Minister of Defense of the Democratic Republic of Afghanistan from 1979 to 1984 and from 1986 to 1988.

Rafie served as vice president under the government of Mohammed Najibullah until the Northern Alliance's overthrow of Najibullah in 1992.

== Later life and death ==
Following Najibullah's overthrow, Rafie went into exile in Germany, where he died on 9 November 2025, at the age of 79.

Political offices
Preceded by Hafizullah Amin	Minister of Defense; January 1979 – 1982	Succeeded by Abdul Qadir
Preceded by Nazar Mohammed	Minister of Defense; December 1986 – 1988	Succeeded by Shahnawaz Tanai
