= Nazar Mohammad (Afghan communist) =

Afghan military officer (1935–1998)

Nazar Mohammad نظرمحمد

Minister of Defense
- In office 4 December 1984 – 4 December 1986
- President: Babrak Karmal; Mohammad Najibullah
- Chairman of the Council of Ministers: Sultan Ali Keshtmand
- Preceded by: Abdul Qadir
- Succeeded by: Mohammed Rafie

Chief of General Staff
- In office January 1984 – December 4, 1984
- Preceded by: Baba Jan Zahid
- Succeeded by: Shahnawaz Tanai

Deputy Minister of Transport
- In office 25 September 1979 – ?

Personal details
- Born: 1935 Shindand, Herat, Kingdom of Afghanistan
- Died: 1998 (aged 62–63) Quetta, Pakistan
- Party: People's Democratic Party of Afghanistan

Military service
- Allegiance: Kingdom of Afghanistan (?–1973); Republic of Afghanistan (1973–1978); Democratic Republic of Afghanistan (1978–1990)
- Branch/service: Afghan Air Force
- Years of service: ?-1990
- Commands: Commander-in-Chief of the Air Force and Air Defense; Commander of the Air Force (1978–1979)
- Battles/wars: Saur Revolution; Soviet–Afghan War; 1990 Afghan coup d'état attempt

Nazar Muhammad (1935–1998) was a Colonel General in the Afghan Armed Forces, the Commander-in-Chief of the Afghan Air Force, the former Minister of Defense as well as the Chief of General Staff before 1988, being replaced by Shahnawaz Tanai. He was born in 1935 in Shindand District, Herat in the Kingdom of Afghanistan and died in 1998, Quetta, Pakistan. He was the former ambassador to West Germany.

== Early life ==
Nazar was born into a Pashtun family residing in Herat, Shindand District. He graduated from Kabul Military School in aviation and immediately joined the Afghan Air Force soon after. In 1974, during the tenure of Mohammad Daoud Khan, he joined the Khalq faction of the People's Democratic Party of Afghanistan despite the repression they’d face from members of the National Revolutionary Party.

== Military career ==
Only five years after Nazar joined the PDPA, he'd be involved in overthrowing Mohammad Daoud Khan and establishing the Democratic Republic of Afghanistan along with the Khalq and some members of Parcham in a violent military coup referred to as the Saur Revolution. After the coup, Nazar was appointed Commander of the Air Force but this was cut short as Hafizullah Amin came into power after assassinating Nur Muhammad Taraki and distrusted Nazar, therefore he was transferred to a secondary position of the Deputy Minister of Transport on 25 September 1979. He was also made the ambassador to West Germany by Amin.

After the entry of Soviet troops into Afghanistan, where Hafizullah Amin was killed and replaced by Babrak Karmal, he was appointed to Commander-in-Chief of the Air Force and Air Defense (since 1980; in the same year, by the second anniversary of the Saur Revolution, he was promoted from lieutenant colonel to major general). According to the memoirs of his then adviser, Lieutenant General Peter Safronov, it was quite easy to work with General Nazar Mohammad.

The main problem was the understaffing of the units with flight personnel. Aviation personnel for the DRA Air Force were actively trained in the USSR and in Afghanistan itself. The DRA Air Force and Air Defense were the most combat-ready branch of the DRA Armed Forces and worked with high “voltage”.

In 1982, he studied at the Military Academy of the General Staff in Moscow and in 1983, Nazar became a member of the Central Committee of the PDPA and the Revolutionary Council. Two years later in November 1985, he'd become a candidate for membership of the Politburo of the Central Committee of the PDPA. Nazar Muhammad would only go on to receive more promotions, as in January 1984, he'd become Chief of the General Staff and on December 4, 1984, he'd finally become the Minister of Defense. This development of the general's career could be due to the dissatisfaction of Soviet military leaders with the activities of Afghan generals from the Parcham faction (in particular, the Chief of General Staff General Babajan). In this situation, a bet was placed on generals from the Khalq faction competing with Parcham. After Nazar Mohammed was appointed minister, another Khalqist, Shahnawaz Tanai, took the post of Chief of General Staff. However, it was noted that there was no improvement in the combat capability of the Afghan Army under the leadership of the Khalq faction.

After Mohammad Najibullah became the president of Afghanistan in 1986, replacing Karmal, Nazar's Parchamite colleague General Mohammed Rafie would return to the post of the Minister of Defense who already had experience in this role from 1980 to 1982. Nazar Mohammed, on the other hand, was transferred to a much less influential position of First Deputy Chairman of the Council of Ministers on December 5, 1986. He would also head the state commission for conscription in the Afghan Army, but he did not show much activity. According to Soviet General Makhmut Gareev, despite the formal diligent work of General Nazar Muhammad, problems in his area of work were poorly resolved.

As a result of being removed from his position of Minister of Defense and being replaced by a Parchamite and his “formal diligent work” being unrecognised, Nazar participated in the 1990 Afghan coup d'état attempt led by Shahnawaz Tanai. After the coup attempt was thwarted, he fled to Pakistan where he'd live for the rest of his life.

== Death ==
In the summer of 1998, he was killed in the city of Quetta in the Pakistani province of Balochistan, shot by four unknown assassins in a cafe. Some people speculate that Nazar's killers could’ve been members of the Taliban.

== Bibliography ==
- Afghanistan. Brief biographical reference book. - Moscow, 2004.
- Korgun V. G. History of Afghanistan. XX century. - Moscow: Publishers: Institute of Oriental Studies of the Russian Academy of Sciences, Kraft+, 2004. - ISBN 5-93675-079-5 ISBN 5-89282-227-3
