= Battles of Zhawar =

1985 battles of the Soviet-Afghan War

The Battles of Zhawar were fought during the Soviet–Afghan War between Soviet Army units, and their allies of the Democratic Republic of Afghanistan against Afghan mujahideen groups. The Soviets' objective was to destroy the Mujahideen logistic base situated at Zhawar, 3 kilometers from the Pakistani border.

== Zhawar ==
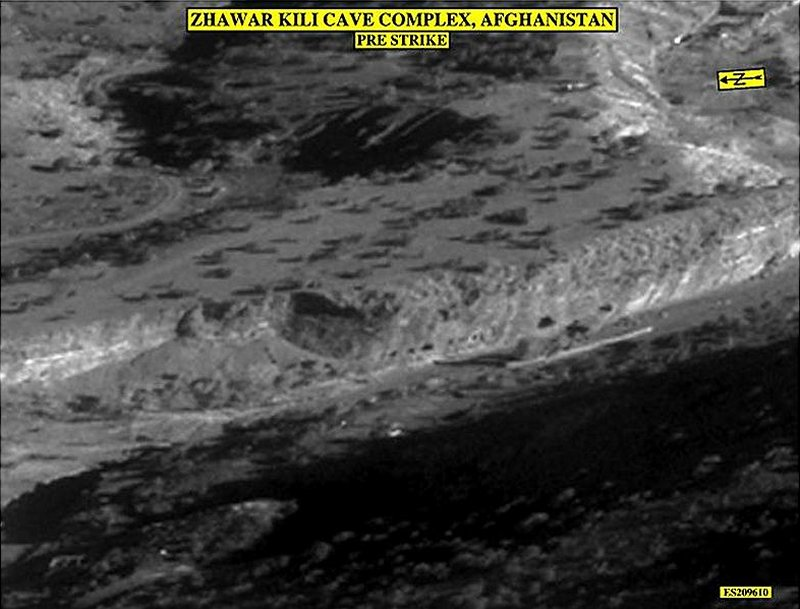
The Zhawar caves in 2002.

The Mujahideen base at Zhawar, situated in Paktia Province, (Note: In 1985, the area became part of the newly established Khost Province.) served as a storage facility for supplies and equipment being transferred from neighbouring Pakistan to the various guerrilla groups operating in the region. It also served as a training and command facility. The Mujahideen had dug tunnels up to 500 m into the Sodyaki Ghar mountain, with accommodations including a hotel, a mosque, a medical point and a garage to house the two T-55 tanks that had been captured from the DRA in 1983.

The troops defending the base numbered 500, and they were armed with a D-30 howitzer, several BM-21 multiple rocket launchers and five ZPU-1 and ZPU-2 heavy machine-guns for air defence. Additionally, other Mujahideen groups were active in the area, and they participated in the defense of the base when necessary. These groups were part of various movements including the Hezbi Islami, the Hezb-e Islami Khalis, the Harakat-i-Inqilab-i-Islami and the Mahaz-e-Melli, though all in theory came under the authority of regional commander Jalaluddin Haqqani.

== The first battle ==
First Battle of Zhawar
- Part of the Soviet–Afghan War
Date	September–October 1985
Location	Zhawar, Paktia Province, Afghanistan
Result	Mujahideen victory

Belligerents
Afghanistan; Soviet Union	Afghan Mujahideen; Pakistan

Commanders and leaders
(Afghanistan) Shahnawaz Tanai, (Afghanistan) Qalandar Shah	Jalaluddin Haqqani; Yunis Khalis; Fathullah Haqqani †

Units involved
(Afghanistan) 12th Infantry Division (Afghanistan) 25th Infantry Division	“Zhawar Regiment”

Strength
	500 mujahideen 2 T-55 tanks

Casualties and losses
Unknown, presumably heavy (mainly DRA)	106 killed 321 injured

The first offensive was launched in September 1985 by elements of the 12th and 25th DRA divisions, supported by Soviet airpower, at a time when the major Mujahideen commanders were absent, including Haqqani, who was performing the Hajj, the pilgrimage to Mecca.

The DRA forces first attacked from Khost, and succeeded in capturing the village of Bori, to the northeast of Zhawar. They then ran into heavy resistance and had to pull back.

The main attack came on September 4, and was at first successful, capturing the village of Lezhi and killing a Mujahideen commander. Very soon the attack was halted at the Manay Kandow pass, that had been heavily fortified by the Mujahideen. For 10 days the defenders held out, but were finally forced to withdraw, under heavy airstrikes by Soviet aircraft. This enabled the DRA forces to cross the pass and capture the Tor Kamar position, overlooking Zhawar, from where they could direct artillery fire at the Mujahideen base.

At this point the Mujahideen launched a counter-attack, led by their two T-55 tanks. The DRA were caught by surprise, as they had not expected to meet armour, and they fell back after sustaining heavy losses. The DRA commander tried to renew the assault, but by that time the Mujahideen had received reinforcements from Pakistan, and they were able to repel further attacks.

Finally after 42 days of fighting, the DRA units withdrew to their bases. This victory considerably boosted the morale of the Mujahideen.

== The second battle ==
Second Battle of Zhawar
- Part of the Soviet–Afghan War
Date	February 28 – April 19, 1986
Location	Zhawar, Khost Province, Afghanistan (spillover into Pakistan)
Result	DRA-Soviet victory

Belligerents
Afghanistan; Soviet Union	Mujahideen; Supported by: Pakistan

Commanders and leaders
(Afghanistan) Nabi Azimi (replaced) (Afghanistan) Qalander Shah (executed) (Soviet Union) Valentin Varennikov	Jalaluddin Haqqani (WIA)

Units involved
(Afghanistan) 37th Commando Brigade (Afghanistan) 38th Commando Brigade (surrendered) (Afghanistan) 466th Commando Battalion (surrendered) (Afghanistan) 666th Commando Battalion (Afghanistan) 203rd Special Purpose Battalion (Afghanistan) 7th Infantry Division (Afghanistan) 8th Infantry Division (Afghanistan) 322nd Fighter Aviation Regiment (Afghanistan) 2nd Border Brigade (Afghanistan) 22nd Guards Regiment	Haqqani Network: Kochi nomad volunteers; Gorbez mujahideen; Arab Volunteers; Pakistani Army: SSG

Strength
12,000	700-800 mujahideen, 100 SSG operators

Casualties and losses
Unknown killed and injured (Afghanistan) 530 captured (78 executed) (Afghanistan) 24 helicopters destroyed	281 killed 363 wounded(Mujahideen data); 2000 killed, 4000 wounded(Afghanistan data)

The second offensive was conducted on a larger scale, and eventually involved 12,000 troops, including 2,200 Soviets, led by DRA General Nabi Azimi, with Soviet General V. G. Trofimenko serving as advisor.

The offensive began on 28 February 1986, a short while after General Secretary Mikhail Gorbachev had announced the decision to withdraw Soviet troops from Afghanistan. Thus the Soviet units were initially confined to supporting the Afghan offensive.

The opening moves were conducted by DRA ground troops attacking from Khost and Gardez who made very slow progress, due to bad weather and harassment by the Mujahideen, reaching the approaches to Zhawar only one month later.

The second phase of the offensive was to be an airborne assault carried out by the Afghan 38th Commando Brigade and the 466th Commando Battalion. The initial assault group, transported by Mi-8 helicopters, departed on 2 April, but they got lost in the darkness and accidentally landed on the wrong side of the Pakistani border. This force was quickly surrounded and taken prisoner. The main airborne assault came in the immediate vicinity of Zhawar, and was supported by precision airstrikes by Soviet Su-25 attack aircraft. These attacks caused some losses among the Mujahideen defenders, even trapping 150 of them, including Haqqani, inside a cave that had been targeted by a missile. Haqqani later escaped and led 700-800 Mujahideen in a series of counter-attacks against the DRA landing zones, that they overran one by one. After three days of fighting, the DRA 38th Commando Brigade had temporarily ceased to exist as a fighting force, and 530 commandos had been captured by the Mujahideen. The DRA also lost 24 helicopters. This fiasco prompted the Soviets to take over the operation, whose command was given to General Valentin Varennikov. The DRA force was strengthened with Soviet units, and the aerial bombardment of Mujahideen positions was intensified and pursued round the clock.

Eventually, on April 17, the offensive was renewed. After several unsuccessful attempts, the DRA/Soviet force managed to capture the strategic Dawri Gar mountain. At a crucial moment, a Hezbi Islami unit drew back from their positions without fighting. At the same time, Jalaluddin Haqqani was injured in an airstrike, causing rumours of his death to spread rapidly among the Mujahideen, and their forces abandoned the defense of Zhawar, that was overrun by government forces.

The Soviet engineers tasked with destroying the base had very little time to do so, as the Afghan troops were intent on withdrawing as soon as possible, fearing a Mujahideen counter-attack. In the end they tried to do as much damage as they could by detonating explosives inside the caves, and laying seismic mines before withdrawing hurriedly.

== Aftermath and losses ==
The Soviet and DRA losses remain uncertain, but were presumably heavy. The Mujahideen claimed to have destroyed 24 helicopters and 2 jets, and captured 530 prisoners, for a loss of 281 killed and 363 injured. Of the 500 Afghan prisoners, 78 officers were tried and executed by Haqqani and Khalis, including the commander of the 37th Commando Brigade, Colonel Qalandar Shah.

The Afghan government celebrated their victory, and though the success had proved costly, it served to alleviate the pressure on Khost, that was then under siege. However, Zhawar was quickly retaken by the Mujahideen, who repaired the damage, and strengthened their defenses. A parade of military units that participated in the operation was held in Kabul, and on August 19, 1986, during the celebration of Army Day, Defense Minister Lieutenant General Nazar Mohammed called the 37th Brigade, the 7th and 8th Infantry Divisions, as well as the 61st Separate Infantry Regiment, the pride of the Afghan Armed Forces. The Revolutionary Council of the DRA awarded the honorary name of "hero" to the 37th Commando Battalion, the 322nd Fighter Aviation Regiment and the 2nd Border Brigade. At the same time, the title of Hero of the DRA was introduced. It is noteworthy that of the first four Afghan heroes, two were commandos: Faiz Mohammed (posthumously) and Lieutenant Juma Khan from the 37th “Hero” Commando Battalion.

== See also ==
- Operation Infinite Reach
