= Yasin Zia =

Afghan military officer and politician

General Yasin Zia
- یاسین ضیا
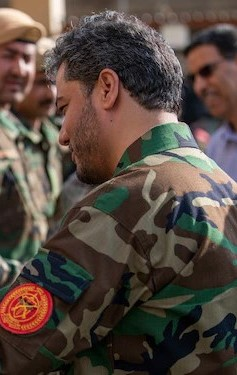
- Zia greeting Afghan National Army troops in 2020

Minister of Defense
- Acting
- In office 19 March 2021 – 19 June 2021
- President: Ashraf Ghani
- Preceded by: Asadullah Khalid
- Succeeded by: Bismillah Khan Mohammadi

Deputy Minister of Defense
- In office 27 March 2019 – 7 July 2020
- Minister: Asadullah Khalid

Chief of General Staff of Afghanistan
- In office 7 July 2020 – 19 June 2021
- President: Ashraf Ghani
- Preceded by: Bismillah Waziri
- Succeeded by: Wali Mohammad Ahmadzai

Deputy National Security Adviser
- In office December 2017 – 27 March 2019

Governor of Takhar
- In office 12 October 2015 – 28 May 2017
- Deputy: Farid Zaki
- Preceded by: Abdul Latif Ibrahimi
- Succeeded by: Fazlullah Mujadedi

Personal details
- Born: Muhammad Yasin Zia Kabul, Afghanistan

Military service
- Allegiance: Afghanistan
- Rank: General
- Battles/wars: War in Afghanistan

Muhammad Yasin Zia (Note: Dari: یاسین ضیا) is an Afghan military officer and politician who is the leader of the Afghanistan Freedom Front (AFF), which is involved in the Republican insurgency in Afghanistan against the Taliban, since 2022. He previously served as Chief of General Staff of the Afghan National Army (ANA) from 2020 to 2021.

He is also a former Deputy Defense Minister, and former governor of Takhar Province, Afghanistan. Zia has also served as head of Afghanistan's counter terrorism unit (2011) and as the deputy director of the National Directorate of Security (2011–2015).

== Early life and family ==
Zia was born in Shakardara District, Kabul, Afghanistan into a Tajik family. He also has a degree in military and intelligence affairs.

== Career ==
=== Governor ===
Zia was appointed governor of Takhar on 12 October 2015. This was probably due to the Battle of Kunduz (2015) and could be seen as an attempt to make sure the Taliban would not repeat its success in Takhar. Farid Zaki served as deputy governor with him. As governor, he played a crucial role in operations to suppress the Taliban insurgency in Takhar and the neighboring Kunduz Province. In addition, according to 1TV, he disguised himself to catch two attorneys taking a bribe.

Yasin Zia resigned his post as governor on 28 May 2017, due to personal issues. He became a deputy National Security Adviser by December 2017. While being appointed, he also was promoted from Major-General to Lieutenant-General.

Zia also took a large role in attempting to reduce illegal activity and corruption in the Afghan Local Police (ALP), including supplementing income via illegal means. He also dealt with improper relations with other, irregular, armed groups. This included sending a message to commanders not to sell weapons given to them to other armed groups and personally confronting the commander of an armed group in Baharak District, Takhar. However, he has said that much of the problem is that several people have personal militias, turning the War in Afghanistan into an internal war. Zia also thought that the program had failed.

=== Deputy Defense Minister and Chief of the General Staff ===
Zia was promoted to Deputy Defense Minister on 27 March 2019. The position was previously vacant for an extended period of time. As deputy general, Zia was assigned to the capital of Takhar, Taloqan, to push Taliban insurgents away and to fix & improve the command structure of Afghan forces. The Taliban were six miles away and had launched an assault in the previous month. Protesters alleged the city was on the verge of collapse; he said afterwards there was no longer a threat. He then became the Army Chief of Staff in 2020, vacating the Deputy Defense Minister position.

Zia also became acting defense minister on 19 March 2021, while Asadullah Khalid was sick and hospitalized. In May 2021, he personally led government forces 120 kilometres (75 mi) from Kabul around and in Mihtarlam, capital of Laghman Province. The Taliban had previously captured security checkpoints around the city and had seized control of Dawlat Shah District about 75 kilometres (47 mi) to the north. The Taliban had also advanced to the central jail of Laghman Province inside the city. Afterwards, Zia said security was improving and the Taliban were beaten back. He was replaced by Wali Mohammad Ahmadzai as Chief of General staff and Bismillah Khan Mohammadi as acting defense minister amid an increase in fighting with the Taliban on 19 June 2021.

While Chief of General Staff, Yāsin Ziā had accused the Taliban of not severing its ties with al-Qaeda, as it pledged to do as part of the Doha Agreement between it and the United States. Ziā said they have not cut ties and they have relations with other terrorist groups, obviously working together in areas. He had said the organizations have become like family over the past several years and expressed skepticism that things will change.
