= Sarandoy =

Gendarmerie of the Democratic Republic of Afghanistan

- Active: 1978–1992
- Country: Afghanistan
- Allegiance: Democratic Republic of Afghanistan
- Branch: Ministry of Interior Affairs
- Type: Gendarmerie; Internal troops
- Role: Domestic security Military reserve force
- Size: 115,000 men (at height)
- Headquarters: Kabul
- Nickname: "Defenders of the Revolution"
- Engagements: Soviet–Afghan War; Afghan Civil War (1989–1992); Afghanistan–Pakistan border skirmishes

Commanders
- Notable commanders: General Sayed Mohammad Gulabzoy; General Mohammad Aslam Watanjar

The Sarandoy (Pashto: څارندوی, lit. 'Defenders of the Revolution') were the gendarmerie force of the Soviet-backed Democratic Republic of Afghanistan under the Ministry of Interior from 1978 to 1992, during the Soviet–Afghan War.

== History ==
The Sarandoy, not to be confused with the Afghanistan Scout Association under the Kingdom of Afghanistan of the same name, were the successor of the former Afghan Regional Gendarmerie, raised in 1978 with an initial strength of 30,000–35,000 officers and enlisted men, intended to be used on internal security duties. The Sarandoy was initially established by President Mohammad Daoud Khan as a national gendarmerie force to support local police, before being reconfigured to an internal security force after the Saur Revolution.

The Soviet MVD Kobalt unit was responsible for providing training assistance to Sarandoy officers from 1980/1981. 5,000 Soviet advisors were brought to Afghanistan to assist in training.

The unit was disbanded by 1992 after the collapse of the DRA and start of the Afghan Civil War (1992–1996) due to mass cases of desertion.

=== Lack of cooperation ===
The Sarandoy was subjected to internal politics of the ruling PDPA, as its forces were controlled by the Khalq faction, opposed to the Parcham faction which controlled the KhAD intelligence service. Accordingly, armed clashes occurred on occasion between the Sarandoy and the KHAD.

In some instances, the Sarandoy's assets were mobilized against pro-Parcham factions.

== Missions ==
The Sarandoy were tasked to provide support for Soviet and Afghan forces during anti-guerrilla operations. They were also tasked to arrest any deserters and ensure conscription compliance. The unit was tasked to investigate and join in operations to arrest anyone deemed to enemies of the government.

From 1985, the Sarandoy were tasked to protect economic assets such as oil fields and gas pipelines. When the Soviets started to leave Afghanistan, they were used to provide security during humanitarian missions and were seen speaking to locals about the purpose of these missions.

A Russian source mentioned that Sarandoy personnel moonlighted as bodyguards under orders from Gulabzoy. Additionally, Osama bin Laden personally led Arab Mujahideen fighters to fight against the Sarandoy’s 7th Operative Regiment, only to fail and take massive casualties.

== Organization ==
Placed under the control of the Ministry of Interior Affairs, the Sarandoy was commanded by the Minister of Interior General Sayed Mohammad Gulabzoy, a former Afghan Air Force officer. At one point, the Sarandoy fielded some 115,000 men, compared to the Afghan Army's 160,000, while at other times the Sarandoy were said to exceed the Army. The unit grew its size in respond to the rise of the mujahideen insurgency.

Those who served in the Sarandoy were paid 162 dollars a month, a wage which was higher than that of Deputy Minister of National Defence before the April 1978 Saur Revolution and some of them would prove effective fighters, although many were little more than thugs.

Mark Urban wrote in 1988 that '...By 1985 there were 20 identified Sarandoy Operational Battalions and Mountain Battalions. They were attached to provincial Sarandoy commands and include[d] armoured vehicles and light artillery. The Kabul Security Command controlled two mobile regiments (the 1st and 2nd)... A further four Sarandoy brigades/regiments have been identified in Badakhshan (24th Sarandoy Brigade), Kandahar, Baghlan and Parwan. At the beginning of 1986, operational control of some units passed to the new unified Ministry of State Security.

A number of previously Sarandoy units were eventually upgraded to Afghan Army formations, as part of the regularization of the militia.

While the Sarandoy were reported to be effective in fighting the mujahideen, Soviet military personnel reported concerns that they were likely to be infiltrated by mujahideen groups. In turn, this forced them to limit sharing information they had with Sarandoy officers.

=== Training ===
Some prospective Sarandoy personnel were chosen to be trained in the USSR. 12,000 of these Sarandoy personnel were trained at MVD facilities in the Soviet Union between 1978 and 1986, many of them being junior commanders and NCOs (non-commissioned officers). 2,500 of these Sarandoy personnel would be trained in Tashkent, the capital of Uzbek Soviet Socialist Republic for past excellence in combat.

== See also ==
- Afghan Local Police (ALP)
- Defense of the Revolution (DotR)
- A Region in Turmoil: South Asian Conflicts since 1947 by Rob Johnson
- Ministry of Interior Affairs (Afghanistan)
