= Abdul Qadir (Afghan communist) =

Afghan military officer and politician (1944–2014)

Colonel general Abdul Qadir
- عبد القادر دگروال
- Qadir on the day after the Saur Revolution, April 29, 1978

Ambassador of Afghanistan to Poland
- In office 3 November 1986 – 13 April 1988
- President: Babrak Karmal; Mohammad Najibullah
- Preceded by: Mohammad Farouq Karmand
- Succeeded by: Nur Ahmad Nura

Minister of Defence
- In office 1982 – December 1984
- President: Babrak Karmal; Mohammad Najibullah
- Premier: Sultan Ali Keshtmand (Chairman of Council of Ministers)
- Preceded by: Mohammed Rafie
- Succeeded by: Nazar Mohammed
- In office 30 April 1978 – August 1978
- President: Hafizullah Amin
- Premier: Sultan Ali Keshtmand
- Preceded by: Ghulam Haidar Rasuli
- Succeeded by: Aslam Vatanjar

Chairman of the Revolutionary Council of the Armed Forces
- In office 28 April 1978 – 30 April 1978
- Preceded by: Mohammad Daoud Khan (as President)
- Succeeded by: Nur Muhammad Taraki

Personal details
- Born: Abdul Qadir; 1944 Herat, Afghanistan
- Died: 22 April 2014 (aged 69–70) Kabul, Afghanistan
- Party: People's Democratic Party
- Children: 5

Military service
- Allegiance: Democratic Republic of Afghanistan (1978–1989)
- Branch/service: Afghan Air Force
- Years of service: 1962–1989
- Rank: Colonel General
- Unit: 355th Fighter-Bomber Aviation Regiment
- Commands: Afghan Air Force
- Battles/wars: 1973 Afghan coup d'état 1975 Panjshir Valley uprising Saur Revolution; Soviet-Afghan War

Colonel General Abdul Qadir (Pashto: عبدالقادر Dari: عبدالقادر , 1944 – 22 April 2014), was an Afghan military officer and politician. He was a participant of the 1973 Afghan coup d'état that created the Republic of Afghanistan under President Mohammad Daoud Khan, and later directed the Afghan Air Force and Army Air Corps squadrons that attacked the Radio-TV station during the Saur Revolution.

He served as the acting head of state for three days when the People's Democratic Party of Afghanistan (PDPA) took power and declared the foundation of the Democratic Republic of Afghanistan, before handing over power to PDPA leader Noor Mohammad Taraki. He later served two terms as Minister of Defense, the first as part of the Taraki government from April to August 1978, and the latter as part of the Babrak Karmal government from 1982 to 1986.

Qadir's second term took place during the Soviet invasion of Afghanistan.

== Early life and military career ==
Abdul Qadir was born in the city of Herat in the Herat Province, Afghanistan, in 1944. He was an ethnic Tajik whose family hailed from the Herat Province.

He joined the Afghan Armed Forces military academy in 1962 and trained as a pilot, in the Soviet Union, where he qualified to fly the MiG-15, MiG-21, and Su-7. During his education in the Soviet Union, he studied at Russian staff colleges. Amidst his career in the Afghan Air Force, he joined the PDPA and later aligned with its Parcham faction.

== Role in the 1973 coup ==
In 1973, Colonel Qadir helped maneuver the coup d'état led by former Prime Minister Mohammad Daoud Khan with support by General Abdul Karim Mustaghni, who had been Chief of General Staff of the armed forces. President Dawood Khan promised radical land reform, the legalisation of political parties and other reforms. Parcham was offered four minister posts in Daoud's government. As a Parcham member, Qadir was nominated vice chief of the Afghan Air Force, while another Parcham supporter, Major Zia Mohammadzi Zia, was appointed chief of the Afghan Army. However, by 1974 Daoud removed and downgraded many of the Parcham ministers in the government. Qadir was thus downgraded to head of Kabul's Military abattoir. Many Parcham supporters, including Colonel Qadir, shifted allegiance to Khalq.

In April 1978 Daoud and his hardline interior minister, General Abdul Qadir Khan Nuristani, launched a sharp government crackdown on the People's Democratic Party of Afghanistan (PDPA). It proved to be a miscalculation. Colonel Qadir and Colonel Mohammad Aslam Watanjar, another leading PDPA member in the military, narrowly escaped arrest and early on 27 April Hafizullah Amin was able to smuggle out the order to restart the coup.

== Role in the Saur Revolution ==
Alongside the tank commander on the ground, Colonel Aslam Watanjar, of the 1st Battalion of the 4th Tank Brigade. Together, the troops under their command took Kabul. The government fell, and Daoud was killed.

Following the seizure of power, Amin and Karmal disagreed on how the party should announce their seizure of power with Amin wanting Taraki to claim power since he was the most recognizable face of the movement while Karmal disagreed. As a compromise Taraki decided that military officers, Watanjar and Qadir should announce the revolution. At 19:00 on 27 April, Qadir and Aslam Watanjar made an announcement over Radio Afghanistan, with Qadir giving the announcement in the Dari language and Watanjar in Pashto, that a Revolutionary Council of the Armed Forces had seized power. The council's initial statement of principles, issued late in the evening of 27 April was a noncommittal affirmation of Islamic, democratic, and nonaligned ideals:

For the first time in the history of Afghanistan, the radio declared, the last remnants of monarchy, tyranny, despotism ... has ended, and all powers of the state are in the hands of the people of Afghanistan.

The Revolutionary Council was formed by himself, Hafizullah Amin, and Major Mohammad Aslam Watanjar, it assumed the control of the country until a civilian government was formed. On 30 April the newly created PDPA's Revolutionary Council (with Nur Mohammad Taraki and Babrak Karmal in its leadership) issued the first of a series of fateful decrees. The decree formally abolished the military's revolutionary council. A second decree, issued on 1 May, named the members of the first cabinet that included Qadir as Minister of Defence. When interviewed by French journalists from Télévision Française 1, on 11 May 1978, Abdul Qadir appeared to be sweating profusely.

== Member of the Khalqist Government ==
He became minister of defense, for three months starting in May 1978. On 6 May Qadir asked the Soviet commanders for advice on how to deal with all the people under arrest. On 17 August, Qadir, still defence minister, was arrested for his part in a conspiracy that allegedly had been organized by the Parchams exiled abroad. Since Qadir remained popular in the military, President Taraki did not dare to kill him and instead he was sentenced to fifteen years in jail.

The policy of Taraki and Hafizullah Amin to get rid of people they considered unsuitable in order to concentrate all power in their own hands became very apparent. Prime Minister Amin later reported:

The party was unable to make Qadir a true Marxist–Leninist, prepared to withstand any negative influence. That was our mistake.

== Member of the Parchamite Government ==
After the Soviet invasion of Afghanistan in 1979 that assassinated Hafizullah Amin, Qadir was released from jail under the new regime of Babrak Karmal, the political posts he held in the PDPA before being sent to jail were restored. He served once again as Minister of Defence (1982–1985) during the Babrak Administration.

After the Soviet Invasion, Kabul was put in a state of siege. The bridges were blocked, barriers and hidden ambushes were set up on all the roads leading into the city. Qadir was made commander of the city. As part of the changes in the leadership of the country, he resigned from the Politburo in November 1985, a year later was appointed Ambassador to Warsaw, Poland by President Mohammad Najibullah. He was recalled to Afghanistan in 1988, and was subsequently elected to Parliament. After the Soviet withdrawal in 1989, it was believed he fled to Bulgaria and sought political asylum.

== Later years and death ==
After some years of living in Bulgaria, Qadir returned to Russia, where he lived with his family. In 2011/2012 he returned to Afghanistan, where he lived in Kabul and completed his book. He died as a result of a stroke at Sardar Mohammad Daoud Khan National Military Hospital on 22 April 2014.

== Views ==
At a mourning ceremony in Moscow to honour the memory of Ahmad Shah Massoud

"Though Massoud and I used to be enemies I am sure he deserves great respect as an outstanding military leader and, first of all, as a patriot of his country". - 2001-09-21

Government offices
Preceded by Mohammad Daoud Khan	Head of the Revolutionary Council of the Armed Forces; April 27–30, 1978	Succeeded by Nur Muhammad Taraki
Political offices
Preceded by Ghulam Haidar Rasuli	Minister of Defense; May–August 1978	Succeeded by Mohammad Aslam Watanjar
Preceded by Mohammed Rafie	Minister of Defense; 1982 – December 1984	Succeeded by Nazar Mohammed
