= Sayed Mohammad Gulabzoy =

Afghan politician and military officer (1951)

Sayed Mohammad Gulabzoi
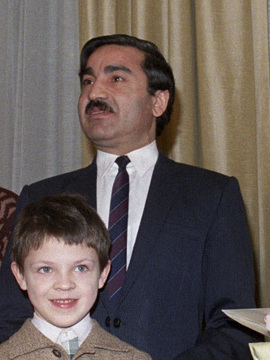
- Gulabzoi in 1989

Member of the House of the People for Khost Province
- In office 7 December 2005 – 15 August 2021

Minister of Internal Affairs
- In office 28 December 1979 – 15 November 1988
- Preceded by: Faqir Mohammad Faqir
- Succeeded by: Mohammad Aslam Watanjar

Minister of Communications
- In office 8 July 1978 – 15 September 1979
- Preceded by: Mohammad Aslam Watanjar
- Succeeded by: Mohammad Zarif

Personal details
- Born: 1951 (age 74–75) Khost Province, Afghanistan
- Party: People's Democratic Party of Afghanistan
- Profession: Military officer, politician

Military service
- Allegiance: Republic of Afghanistan (1973–1978); Democratic Republic of Afghanistan (1978–1990)
- Branch/service: Afghan Air Force
- Years of service: 1968–1990
- Battles/wars: 1973 Afghan coup d'état; 1975 Panjshir Valley uprising; Saur Revolution; Soviet-Afghan War; First Afghan Civil War

Sayed Muhammad Gulabzoi (Pashto: سید محمد ګلابزوی) (born 1951) is an Afghan former military officer and politician. He was a prominent political figure in the government of the Democratic Republic of Afghanistan and played a notable role in the Saur Revolution that placed the People's Democratic Party of Afghanistan (PDPA) in power and installed a communist government in Afghanistan. Gulabzoi was also one of the leaders of PDPA's Khalq faction.

An ethnic Pashtun from the Zadran tribe, Gulabzoi was born in Paktia Province. An Afghan Air Force mechanic by training, he studied at the Air Force college. As an air force officer, he supported Daoud Khan's 1973 coup d'état which overthrew King Zahir Shah, for which he was rewarded with the position of Aide to the Air Force Commander. In 1976, he went to the Soviet Union to study radar technology.

He was recruited into the Khalq faction of the communist People's Democratic Party of Afghanistan (PDPA) by Hafizullah Amin. He held only a minor role in the Saur Revolution of 1978, which brought the PDPA to power. Following the coup, he was appointed aide to President Nur Muhammad Taraki, and later Minister of Communications. As internal struggles grew within the communist regime, he distanced himself from Amin, and joined a group of officers (the "gang of four") plotting against Amin, which also included Aslam Watanjar and Assadullah Sarwari. When their coup failed, the conspirators took refuge in the Soviet embassy on September 14, 1979. In December 1979, Gulabzoi and his allies assisted the Soviet invasion of Afghanistan by serving as guides to Soviet troops.

During the invasion, Soviet forces killed Amin and installed PDPA Parcham faction's leader Babrak Karmal in power. Karmal was forced to come to terms with the rival Khalq faction, as many key posts in the military were still occupied by Khalqis. As a conciliatory measure, Gulabzoi, a prominent Khalqi, was appointed Minister of Interior. As such he was placed in command of the Sarandoy ("Defenders of the Revolution"), a heavily armed paramilitary gendarmerie force. After Amin's death, Gulabzoy was the self-styled leader of Khalq.

In November 1988, amid renewed tensions between Khalq and Parcham, he was removed from his post and sent to Moscow as ambassador by Parchami president Mohammad Najibullah. He concurrently served as DRA ambassador to Romania and Finland. He was rumoured to have proposed himself to the Soviets as a potential replacement for Najibullah. In March 1990, following an unsuccessful coup attempt by General Shahnawaz Tanai, Gulabzoi was expelled from the party, along with other Khalqis. From 1990 to 1992 he lived in Armenia, before relocating to Moscow.

In 2005, was elected to represent Khost Province in Afghanistan's Wolesi Jirga, the lower house of its National Legislature.

He holds a Master's degree in Law and Military Science, and sat on the Internal Security Committee.

== Alleged KGB Connection ==
According to the Mitrokhnin archives, Gulabzoi was a KGB agent code-named 'Momand'.
