= Defense of the Revolution =

Soldier designation

- Active: 1978–1980
- Country: Afghanistan
- Allegiance: Democratic Republic of Afghanistan
- Branch: People's Democratic Party of Afghanistan (PDPA)
- Type: Paramilitary
- Role: Anti-tank warfare Counter-revolutionary; Counterinsurgency; Counterintelligence; Covert operation Desert warfare Force protection HUMINT; Internal security Raiding; Reconnaissance; Tracking
- Size: 20,000 men (at height)
- Headquarters: Kabul
- Nicknames: DotR, CDR, NODR
- Engagements: Soviet–Afghan War

Defense of the Revolution was a generic term employed to designate the irregular paramilitary units created by the Communist government of Afghanistan following the 1978 Saur Revolution, with the intent of mobilizing the population against counter-revolutionary and other enemies of the new state. These units were officially volunteer, and based on the "Cuban model"; they were armed by the government and employed to guard sensitive infrastructure and maintain public order. Some reports indicate volunteers received incentives such as coupons for government stores. Editorials in the Soviet journal Pravda praised these defensive formations as early as mid-1979.

Bruce Amstutz documents DotR units composed of teenage urban males, numbering 20,000 on paper by the mid-1980s, who received US$162 per month for supporting the security forces. Other academics have commented on the female members of DotR units.

== Early organization ==
Hafizullah Amin, the General Secretary of the People's Democratic Party of Afghanistan (PDPA), had established in 1978 the Committees for the Defense of the Revolution – CDR, later reorganized into the National Organization for the Defense of the Revolution – NODR. Despite extensive coverage in Afghan media, all mention of the NODR disappeared following the Soviet invasion of Afghanistan in December 1979.

Amin was assassinated in the takeover, and the core staff who had developed the CDR and NODR were arrested and executed or simply disappeared. Anthony Arnold suggests that the Soviets considered a loosely accountable body of irregular armed groups to be undesirable during their occupation.

== See also ==
- Sarandoy

== Bibliography ==
- Antonio Giustozzi, War, Politics and Society in Afghanistan, 1978-1992, Georgetown University Press 2000. ISBN 978-0878407583, 0878407588
- Edgar O'Ballance, Afghan Wars, Battles in a hostile land - 1839 to the present, Brassey's, London 1993 (revised edition 2002). ISBN 1 85753 308 9
- David Isby and Ron Volstad, Russia's War in Afghanistan, Men-at-arms series 178, Osprey Publishing Ltd, London 1986. ISBN 0-85045-691-6
- Ken Guest, Afghanistan, in Flashpoint! At the Front Line of Today’s Wars, Arms and Armour Press, London 1994, pp. 9-37. ISBN 1-85409-247-2
- Mark Urban, War in Afghanistan, Palgrave Macmillan, London 1988. ISBN 978-0333432648, 0333432649
