= 1990 Afghan coup attempt =

Attempted overthrow of President Mohammad Najibullah of Afghanistan

1990 Afghan coup d'état attempt
- Part of the Afghan Civil War (1989–1992)
Date	6 March 1990
Location	Kabul, Afghanistan
Result	Afghan government victory; Shahnawaz Tanai flees to Pakistan; Coup attempt thwarted

Belligerents
(Afghanistan) Afghan government	Army; Khalqist faction; Hezb-e Islami Gulbuddin; Supported by: Pakistan: ISI

Commanders and leaders
(Afghanistan) Mohammad Najibullah (Afghanistan) General Jamil Khan (Afghanistan) Mohammad Aslam Watanjar (Afghanistan) Khushal Peroz (Afghanistan) Baba Jan (Afghanistan) Jalal Razmenda	Shahnawaz Tanai; Gulbuddin Hekmatyar; Assadullah Sarwari; Sayed Mohammad Gulabzoy; Bacha Gul Wafadar; Mohammad Hasan Sharq; Nazar Mohammad; Mohammad Dawran (alleged); Osama bin Laden

Military support
Afghan Armed Forces; Afghan Army; 717th Civil Disciplinary Regiment; Harbi Military University students; 10th Infantry Division; Afghan Commando Forces; Afghan National Guard; 21st Guards Regiment; 22nd Guards Regiment; Sarandoy; 8th Gendarme Brigade; WAD; 1st Directorate; 5th Directorate; Revolution Defence Units	Coup plotters; Afghan Army; 4th Tank Brigade; 15th Tank Brigade; 52nd Signal Regiment; 61st Strike Regiment; 40th Infantry Division; 8th Infantry Division; 61st Heavy Artillery Regiment; Afghan Commando Forces; 37th Commando Brigade; Afghan Air Force; 99th Missile Brigade; 77th Air Defence Regiment; Sarandoy; 22nd Motorway Sentry Brigade; 5th Gendarme Division; Afghan Border Force; Border Force Training Centre; Military faction of Hezb-i Islami Gulbuddin

The 1990 Afghan coup d'etat attempt occurred on March 6, 1990, when General Shahnawaz Tanai, a hardline communist and Khalqist who served as Minister of Defence, attempted to overthrow President Mohammad Najibullah of the Republic of Afghanistan. The coup attempt failed and Tanai was forced to flee to Pakistan.

== Background ==
Tanai, who has been described alternatively as a "radical nationalist" and a "hard-line communist" of the radical Khalq faction of the People's Democratic Party of Afghanistan, was fiercely anti-mujahideen yet launched an unlikely alliance with the Islamist (but also nationalist) rebel Gulbuddin Hekmatyar of the Hezb-e Islami Gulbuddin party. Tanai was against Najibullah's peace plans and supported a military solution to the conflict. Hekmatyar ordered his fighters to intensify their attacks against the Kabul regime in support of Tanai. The success of the coup was taken for granted. A previous coup attempt by Khalqists was foiled in December 1989, to which Tanai has been linked. The coup occurred a year following the Soviet withdrawal from Afghanistan.

Tanai was apparently also supported by those important Khalqists who remained in the Politburo, Assadullah Sarwari and Sayed Mohammad Gulabzoy, respectively their country's envoys to Aden and Moscow. They were said to have been intimately connected with the coup and with Tanai. Sarwari, an old comrade of Tanai, was the chief of the Afghan intelligence (KHAD) under Nur Muhammad Taraki. He was a Khalqist hardliner known as the assassin of a rival Parcham faction member. Gulabzoy was minister of interior before being exiled on a diplomatic assignment to Moscow.

Tanai stated that he didn't disagree with President Najibullah's views, but rather with his policy on the military.

Najibullah was transferring all the privileges of the Army to the tribal militias and in particular to his special guard. I was against this because the Afghan Army was losing efficiency.

The Pakistani government supported the Coup in the moment hoping to weaken the Najibullah government although Tanai himself was no friend of Pakistan as he had been insistent to Najibullah to point SCUD missiles at Islamabad in retlation for supporting the rebels. Prime Minister Benazir Bhutto's plea to the other six party leaders to aid Tanai and Hekmatyar was rebuked as a disgrace to the jihad. Most of the factions viewed General Tanai as an opportunistic war criminal and hardline communist who was responsible for carpet-bombings in portions of the major western city of Herat in March 1979. The coup attempt was partially financed by Osama bin Laden, who bribed Afghan Armed Forces officers into deserting.

== Coup attempt ==
Tanai ordered air strikes against government buildings. Jets flown by Afghan Air Force pilots loyal to Tanai flew in Kabul to bomb the targets, but most were repelled by the Army. Air Force Commander Abdul Qadir Aqa was an accomplice. Three rockets landed near the Presidential Palace. However the expected uprising by the Afghan Army didn't take place: Tanai had no direct control of troops inside Kabul. Tanai had sent the 15th Tank Brigade into the city to attack the Palace. Interior Minister Mohammad Aslam Watanjar played a major role in halting the coup plotters. He ordered a battalion to intercept the tanks and told his forces to capture Tanai "dead or alive". There was street fighting near the palace as well, with the WAD-led Gard-e-Khas paramilitary force additionally playing an important role involved in suppressing the coup. Commandos of the defunct (since 1988) Afghan Air Assault Brigades were also recorded attempting to defuse the situation after the coup attempt failed.

President Najibullah appeared on television at 10 p.m. the same night to prove that he was physically there and in effective control of the state apparatus. The President gathered the support of important Parchamite militias, including the elite Special Guard to defuse the plot.

Najibullah later claimed that the Soviet Union offered help to defeat the coup, to which he thanked the offer and replied: "There's no need now. But if we face a foreign attack that will be another matter", referring to Pakistan.

== Aftermath ==
In the afternoon of March 7, Tanai escaped to Bagram Air Base and fled by helicopter to Peshawar, Pakistan where he was greeted and publicly accepted as an ally by Hekmatyar. Eventually, he settled there in Pakistan. Tanai would later state the reason he fled to Pakistan was his only options were Iran, the Soviet Union or Pakistan, knowing the Soviets would probably turn him over and Iran was hostile to the Khalqists he decided Pakistan as Hekmatyar promised him protection. He lived in exile until later returning to Afghanistan. A general and two commanders loyal to Tanai were killed during the coup attempt.

Najibullah grew even more suspicious of Khalqists, and thus another purge occurred, further deepening the rift between the two factions. In all, 127 Khalqist military officers were arrested for the attempted coup, including Sarwari and Gulabzoy. The commanders of the 37th Commando Brigade and the newly-established 61st Strike Regiment were also arrested, as the entire regiment took part in the coup in support of Tanai. Twenty-seven officers escaped and later showed up at a press conference with Hekmatyar in Peshawar. Former Minister of Tribal Affairs, Bacha Gul Wafadar and Minister of Civil Aviation Mohammad Hasan Sharq were among the conspirators. General Watanjar was awarded a four-star rank and became the new Minister of Defence following his efforts against the coup plotters.
