= Shahnawaz Tanai =

Afghan politician and military officer (1950–2022)

Lieutenant general Shahnawaz Tanai
- Shahnawaz Tanai in 1990

Minister of Defence
- In office May 1988 – March 1990
- President: Mohammad Najibullah
- Preceded by: Mohammed Rafie
- Succeeded by: Aslam Watanjar

Head of Military Intelligence (KHAD)
- In office May 1978–?
- President: Nur Muhammad Taraki

Chief of General Staff of the Afghan National Army
- In office December 1984 – March 1990
- Preceded by: Nazar Mohammed
- Succeeded by: Asif Delawar

Personal details
- Born: 1950 Dargai, Khost, Kingdom of Afghanistan
- Died: 7 March 2022 (aged 72) Islamabad, Pakistan
- Party: People's Democratic Party of Afghanistan – Khalq
- Other political affiliations: Afghanistan Peace Movement
- Children: 1
- Education: Harbi Military University; Ryazan Guards Higher Airborne Command School

Military service
- Allegiance: Republic of Afghanistan (1973–1978); Democratic Republic of Afghanistan (1978–1987); Republic of Afghanistan (1987–1990); Hezbi Islami Gulbuddin (1990–1992)
- Branch/service: Afghan Army; Afghan Commando Forces
- Years of service: 1968–1990
- Rank: Lieutenant General
- Unit: 444th Commando Battalion; 37th Commando Brigade
- Commands: 1st Central Army Corps; Artillery Corps Commander; 37th Commando Brigade Commander
- Battles/wars: 1975 Panjshir Valley uprising; Saur Revolution; 1979 Herat uprising; Soviet-Afghan War; Battles of Zhawar; First Afghan Civil War; 1990 Afghan coup d'état attempt
- Awards: Order of the Saur Revolution

Lieutenant General Shahnawaz Tanai (Pashto; شهنواز تنی) was an Afghan military officer and politician who served as the Chief of General Staff of the Afghan Army during the Soviet-Afghan War until being exiled following a failed coup d'état in 1990. He ran for President during the 2009 Afghan Presidential Election.

Besides commanding the Afghan Army during the Soviet-Afghan War, his command assignments included the command of the artillery and as director of military intelligence as well as serving as minister of defense under President Mohammad Najibullah. He was a hardline member of the Khalq faction of the People's Democratic Party of Afghanistan (PDPA), and leader of at least the majority of the Khalqist faction since its former leader Sayed Mohammad Gulabzoy was exiled as Ambassador to the Soviet Union as part of the political preparation of the Soviet pullout from Afghanistan in September 1988. A pillar of the communist regime, Tanai later attempted a coup against his former friend and President Najibullah, before seeking refuge in a hostile Pakistan and working with fundamentalists such as Gulbuddin Hekmatyar. He returned in 2005 and created a political party.

He was described as a "radical nationalist" who, despite being fiercely pro-Soviet, still maintained secret contacts with certain mujahideen members.

== Early life and military career ==
Tanai was born in 1950 in Dargai village, located in Khost, Afghanistan to a poor ethnic Pashtun family, belonging to the Tanai tribe. He joined the Afghan Army in 1968 and served in its commando forces unit. Tanai received his military training in the Soviet Union where he first studied infantry tactics and later excelled in military leadership.

After the Saur Revolution in 1978, the coup d'état that resulted in the overthrow and assassination of President Mohammed Daoud Khan, Tanai, was appointed head of Military Intelligence. He survived through the years of bloodshed that followed during the Saur Revolution. His first appointment was as Commander of the Kabul garrison.

When Mohammad Hasan Sharq was selected by President Najibullah as the new Prime Minister, the position of Minister of Defense was vacant for some time but was finally awarded to Tanai. Tanai was recognized as a hawk and a sworn enemy of the Mujahideen, and he even urged firing Scud missiles at Islamabad, the capital of Pakistan, in retribution for their support for the Afghan mujahideen. He sought a military solution to the Soviet-Afghan War, as opposed to the party's policy (under Najibullah) of national reconciliation. Tanai was also a notable participant of the 1989 Battle of Jalalabad during the First Afghan Civil War.

== Coup of March 1990 ==
On 6 March 1990, when the trial of army officers from the PDPA's Khalq faction was about to start, Tanai launched a coup with the help of renegade mujahideen commander, Gulbuddin Hekmatyar, against the then President Mohammad Najibullah, claiming that the government had lost touch with its ideals. Tanai and Hekmatyar planned to form a joint council between Khalq and Hezbi Islami. The Afghan Interim Government refused to take part in the coup with Burhanuddin Rabbani stating that there was no difference between Najibullah and Tanai and that “Whatever Hekmatyar does is his own business in which the Mujahideen have no contribution.” Other leaders such as Sibghatullah Mujaddedi stated that the jihad would continue against the Tanai-Hekmatyar coalition government.

The expected uprising by the Afghan Army did not take place: Tanai had no direct control of troops inside Kabul. President Najibullah appeared on television at 10 p.m. the same night to prove that he was physically there and in effective control of the state apparatus. Tanai escaped by helicopter to Peshawar, Pakistan, where he was greeted and publicly accepted as an ally by Hekmatyar. Eventually, he settled there in Pakistan, where he lived in exile until August of that same year.

== Post-1990 and later life ==
Afghanistan Peace Movement De Afghanistan De Solay Ghorzang Gond
- Leader: Shahnawaz Tanai
- Founder: Shahnawaz Tanai
- Preceded by: Khalq
- Ideology: Pashtun nationalism (Left-wing nationalism); Socialism
- Political position: Left-wing

Later it was alleged, but never proven, that Tanai had assisted the Taliban, more specifically by providing the fundamentalist group with personnel from the disbanded Afghan Commando Forces, Afghan Army and KHAD. Pakistan's army mistrusted Tanai due to his nationalist credentials. Nonetheless, the Northern Alliance trumpeted the claim that Tanai had supported the Taliban, although this was quite easily disproven, and their own ranks included former communist leaders like Abdul Rashid Dostum.

Tanai was latterly the leader of the Afghanistan Peace Movement (De Afghanistan De Solay Ghorzang Gond) party. In 2005, he returned to Khost province to make a political comeback. He drove from Islamabad to the border town of Torkham, where he crossed over to Afghanistan to be warmly received by his supporters. He was then escorted in a convoy of vehicles to Kabul, where he resided. He did not stand as a presidential candidate in the 2004 elections, but his movement was enrolled as the 29th political party for the 2004 elections, and it was expected that his influence would bring back Khalqists from exile, to play a political role. He also campaigned for a bigger role for Pashtuns and he openly criticised United States policies that perpetuated the Northern Alliance domination in Kabul.

There were allegations that Tanai had been sent by Pakistan to influence Afghanistan's politics in the post-Taliban period. He was also accused of working for Pakistan's Inter Services Intelligence (ISI). According to western diplomatic sources, Tanai acted as an agent for ISI by providing the Taliban a skilled cadre of military officers from the Khalq faction of the People's Democratic Party of Afghanistan to use his pilots to fly Mig-23, Sukhoi fighters of what was left of the Afghan Air Force, drive Soviet tanks and the use of Soviet artillery. However, most neutral sources doubt this claim, partly because Western sources have tended to play up the ISI's role in the Pashtun discontent, and partly because of Tanai's unpopularity with Pakistan's army and intelligence—as opposed to the Pakistan People’s Party in power when he fled to Pakistan. Tanai also was considered a Pashtun nationalist, making him a liability to Pakistan.

In a 2009 interview, Tanai stated that the NATO troops are no different than Soviet troops and that they must leave Afghanistan.

Following the Taliban takeover of Kabul in 2021, Tanai was pictured in October 2021 in Kabul in meetings with both Gulbuddin Hekmatyar and former president Hamid Karzai.

On 7 March 2022, it was announced that Tanai had died at the age of 72 in an Islamabad hospital.

Political offices
Preceded by Nazar Mohammed	Chief of General Staff; December 1984 – March 1990	Succeeded by Mohammed Asif Delawar
Preceded by Mohammed Rafie	Minister of Defense; May 1988 – March 1990	Succeeded by Mohammed Aslam Watanjar
