= Ministry of Defense (Afghanistan) =

Afghan government ministry responsible for military and national defense matters

- Pashto: د ملي دفاع وزارت; Dari: وزارت دفاع ملی
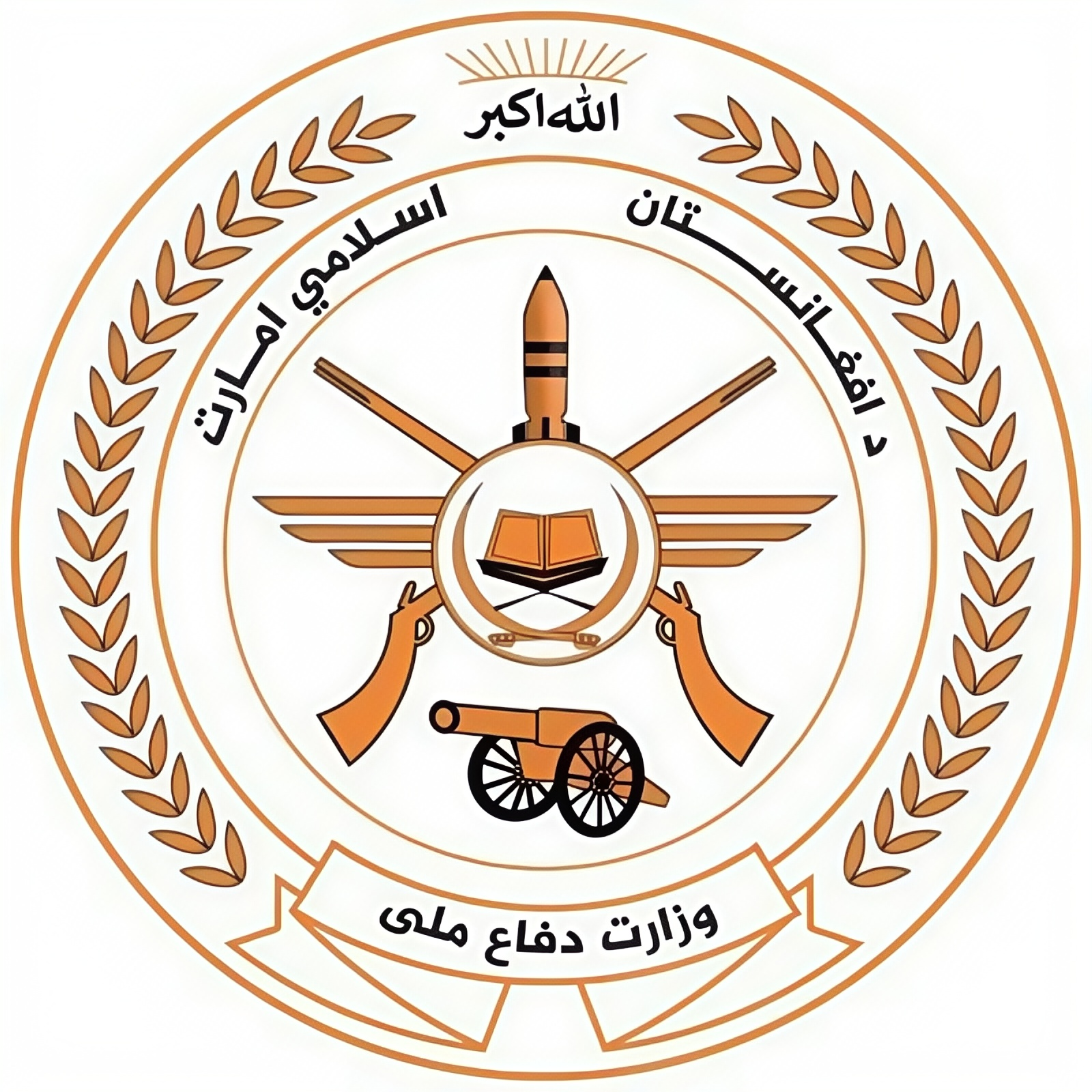
- Emblem of the Ministry of Defense of the Islamic Emirate of Afghanistan

Department overview
- Formed: January 1929
- Jurisdiction: Government of Afghanistan
- Headquarters: Kabul; 34.523938°N 69.186437°E
- Minister responsible: Mullah Yaqoob
- Deputy Minister responsible: Abdul Qayyum Zakir
- Department executives: Muhammad Ali Akhund, Director of Intelligence; Qari Lutfullah "Habibi", Spokesperson
- Child Department: General Directorate of Intelligence
- Website: Official website Official YouTube channel

The Ministry of Defense (Note: Pashto: د دفاع ملي وزارت, romanized: Də difā' milli wizārat [d̪ə d̪i.pɑ/di.fɑ(ʔ) mi(l).li wi.zɑ.'ɾat̪]; Dari: وزارت دفاع ملی, romanized: Wizārat-i Difā'-i Millī, [wɪ.zɑː.ɾát̪‿ɪ d̪ɪ.fɑ́ː(ʔ)‿ɪ mɪl.líː]) is the cabinet ministry of Afghanistan responsible for overseeing the Afghan Armed Forces (currently referred to as the Islamic Emirate Armed Forces). The ministry is located in Kabul.

== The Democratic Republic period ==
The Ministry of Defense emblem from 1987 to 1992

From the 30th of April until 9 August 1978, Abdul Qadir succeeded the slain Ghulam Haidar Rasuli as Defense Minister of the DRA, responsible for the Armed Forces of the Democratic Republic of Afghanistan, until being succeeded by General Aslam Watanjar. In 1990 forces loyal to Minister of Defense Shahnawaz Tanai and Hezbi Islami leader Gulbuddin Hekmatyar attempted a fail coup against then President Najibullah. His forces were thwarted by General Aslam Watanjar who was rewarded the post of Minister of Defence. Watanjar would be the last Minister of Defense of the DRA/ROA. The government collapsed in 1992.

Additionally, the Ministry of Defense also had their own annual publication titled “The Military Magazine” (Pashto: د اردو مجله, Dari: مجله ارتش) which began in 1967, under the Kingdom of Afghanistan. This was continued under the Democratic Republic of Afghanistan.

== The Islamic Republic period ==
Former logo from 2018.

During the Islamic Republic of Afghanistan (2004–2021), the defense minister was nominated by the President of Afghanistan and the National Assembly made the final approval.

One of the functions of the Defense Ministry during that period was the continuance of disarming insurgent groups, through programmes such as the Afghan New Beginnings Programme (which included the rehabilitation and reintegration of child soldiers). These militant groups coalesced from warlords and former army personnel after the collapse of the Najibullah government in 1992.

== List of ministers ==
Prior to 1929, Afghanistan had no ministers of defense but rather ministers of war.

=== Ministers of War ===
- Mohammad Nadir, May 1919 to January 1922
- Mohammad Hashim, January 1922 to September 1922
- Mohammad Nadir, September 1922 to April 1924
- Muhammad Wali, April 1924 to June 1924
- Abdul Aziz Barakzai, June 1924 to January 1929

=== Ministers of Defense ===
No.	Portrait	Name (Birth–Death)	Term of office			Political affiliation	Ref.
No.	Portrait	Name (Birth–Death)	Took office	Left office	Time in office	Political affiliation	Ref.
1		Sayyid Husayn (?–1929)	January 1929	March 1929	2 months	Saqqawist	
2		Purdil Khan (?–1930)	March 1929	October 1929	7 months	Saqqawist	
3		Shah Mahmud Khan (1890–1959)	1929	1947	17–18 years	Independent	
–		Amanul Mulk (?–c. 2011) (Note: Rebel defence minister in the Eastern Province, during the 1944–47 tribal revolts.)	c. 1944	c. 1946	1–2 years	Unknown	
4		Mohammad Daoud Khan (1909–1978)	1947	1948	0–1 years	Independent	
5		Gen. Muhammad Umar (1898–1964)	1948	1952	3–4 years	Unknown	
6		Mohammed Arif (1907–1983)	1952	1958	5–6 years	Unknown	
(4)		Mohammad Daoud Khan (1909–1978)	1958	1963	4–5 years	Independent	
7		Khan Mohammad (1911–2006)	1963	1973	9–10 years	Unknown	
(4)		Mohammad Daoud Khan (1909–1978)	1973	1973	0 years	Independent	
8		Abdul Karim Mustaghni (1911–2004)	1973	1977	3–4 years	Republican (from 1974)	
9		Ghulam Haidar Rasuli (1919–1978)	7 November 1977	28 April 1978	172 days	Republican	
10		Abdul Qadir (1944–2014)	27 April 1978	17 August 1978	112 days	PDPA–Parcham	
11		Nur Muhammad Taraki (1917–1979)	17 August 1978	1 April 1979	227 days	PDPA–Khalq	
12		Mohammad Aslam Watanjar (1946–2000)	1 April 1979	28 July 1979	118 days	PDPA–Khalq	
13		Hafizullah Amin (1929–1979)	28 July 1979	27 December 1979 (Note: Assassinated by Soviet special forces during the Operation Storm-333.)	152 days	PDPA	
14		Mohammed Rafie (1946–2025)	28 December 1979	1982	2–3 years	PDPA	
(10)		Abdul Qadir (1944–2014)	1982	September 1984	1–2 years	PDPA–Parcham	
15		Nazar Mohammad (1935–1998)	4 December 1984	4 December 1986	2 years	PDPA–Khalq	
(14)		Mohammed Rafie (1946–2025)	December 1986	May 1988	1 year, 5 months	PDPA	
16		Shahnawaz Tanai (1950–2022)	May 1988	March 1990 (Note: Dismissed following the 1990 Afghan coup attempt.)	1 year, 10 months	PDPA–Khalq	
(12)		Mohammad Aslam Watanjar (1946–2000)	March 1990	April 1992	2 years, 1 month	PDPA–Khalq	
–		Ahmad Shah Massoud (1953–2001)	28 April 1992	28 June 1992	61 days	Jamiat-e Islami	
17		Ahmad Shah Massoud (1953–2001)	28 June 1992	9 September 2001	9 years, 73 days	Jamiat-e Islami	
18		Obaidullah Akhund (1968–2010)	April 1997	9 September 2001	4 years, 5 months	Taliban	
19		Mohammed Fahim (1957–2014)	9 September 2001	23 December 2004	3 years, 105 days	Jamiat-e Islami	
20		Abdul Rahim Wardak (born 1945)	23 December 2004	7 August 2012	7 years, 228 days	Mahaz-e-Milli-ye Islami	
–		Enayatullah Nazari (born 1954) acting	8 August 2012	15 September 2012	38 days	Jamiat-e Islami	
21		Bismillah Khan Mohammadi (born 1961)	15 September 2012	24 May 2015	2 years, 251 days	Jamiat-e Islami	
–		Mohammed Masoom Stanekzai (born 1958) acting	24 May 2015	20 June 2016	1 year, 27 days	Independent (Military)	
22		Abdullah Habibi (born 1952)	20 June 2016	24 April 2017	308 days	Independent (Military)	
23		Tariq Shah Bahramee (born 1967)	24 April 2017	23 December 2018	1 year, 243 days	Independent (Military)	
–		Asadullah Khalid (born 1970)	23 December 2018	21 November 2020	1 year, 334 days	Ittehad-e Islami	
24		Asadullah Khalid (born 1970)	21 November 2020	19 March 2021	118 days	Ittehad-e Islami	
–		Yasin Zia acting	19 March 2021	19 June 2021	92 days	Independent (Military)	
(21)		Bismillah Khan Mohammadi (born 1961)	19 June 2021	15 August 2021	57 days	Jamiat-e Islami	
–		Abdul Qayyum Zakir (born 1973) acting	24 August 2021	7 September 2021	14 days	Taliban	
–		Mullah Yaqoob (born 1990)	7 September 2021	15 August 2025	4 years, 360 days	Taliban	
25		Mullah Yaqoob (born 1990)	15 August 2025	Incumbent	4 years, 360 days	Taliban	
