= Mohammad Aslam Watanjar =

Afghan politician and military officer

Colonel general Aslam Watanjar
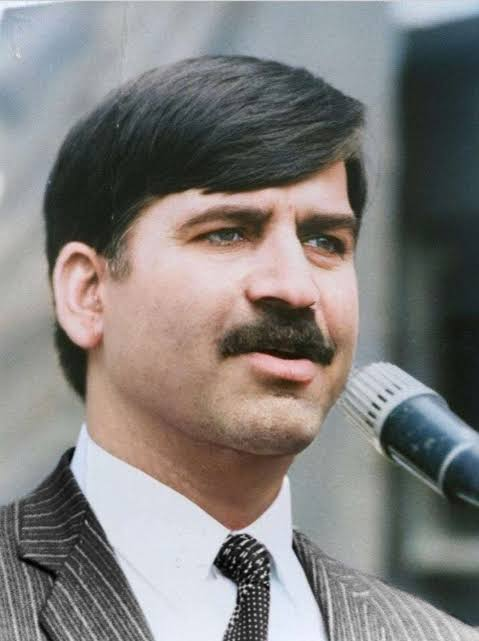
- Aslam Watanjar in the 1980s

Minister of Defence
- In office 6 March 1990 – April 1992
- Preceded by: Shahnawaz Tanai
- Succeeded by: Ahmad Shah Massoud
- In office 31 March – 28 July 1979
- Preceded by: Abdul Qadir
- Succeeded by: Hafizullah Amin

Minister of Internal Affairs
- In office 15 November 1988 – 6 March 1990
- Preceded by: Sayed Mohammad Gulabzoy
- Succeeded by: Raz Muhammad Paktin
- In office 28 July 1979 – 19 September 1979
- Preceded by: Sherjan Mazdoryar
- Succeeded by: Vacant
- In office 11 July 1978 – 1 April 1979
- Preceded by: Nur Ahmad Nur
- Succeeded by: Sherjan Mazoryar

Minister of Communications
- In office 10 January 1980 – 1988
- Preceded by: Mohammad Zarif
- Succeeded by: Unknown
- In office 30 April 1978 – July 1978
- Preceded by: Abdul Karim Attayee
- Succeeded by: Sayed Mohammad Gulabzoy

Chief of General Staff
- In office 28 April 1978 – 1 April 1979
- Preceded by: Ghulam Haidar Rasuli
- Succeeded by: Mohammed Yakub

Personal details
- Born: 1946 Paktia Province, Kingdom of Afghanistan
- Died: 24 November 2000 (aged 53–54) Odesa, Ukraine
- Party: People's Democratic Party of Afghanistan-Khalq
- Profession: Military officer Politician
- Nickname: "The Yeti"

Military service
- Allegiance: Democratic Republic of Afghanistan (1978–1992)
- Branch/service: Afghan Army
- Years of service: 1967–1992
- Rank: Colonel General
- Commands: 4th Tank Brigade
- Battles/wars: 1973 Afghan coup d'état; 1975 Panjshir Valley uprising; Saur Revolution; 1979 Herat uprising; Soviet-Afghan War; 1990 Afghan coup attempt; Afghan Civil War (1989-1992)

Mohammad Aslam Watanjar (Note: Pashto: محمد اسلم وطنجار) (1946 – November 2000) was an Afghan military officer and politician. He played a significant role in the coup in 1978 that killed the Afghan President Mohammad Daoud Khan, starting the Saur Revolution. Watanjar later became a member of the politburo in the Soviet-backed Democratic Republic of Afghanistan.

== Early life ==
An ethnic Ghilzai Pashtun, Aslam Watanjar was born in 1946, in Zurmula, in Afghanistan's Paktia Province. He trained as a tank commander in the Soviet Union following his graduation from the Military Academy in Kabul in 1967, being part of the Afghan Army's 4th Tank Brigade.

== Saur Revolution ==
Watanjar's role in the communist coup of 1978 was important. Instructed by Hafizullah Amin, he initiated the march of tank forces from the 4th and 15th Tank Brigades near Pul-e-Charkhi against the Republican government of Daoud Khan.

Colonel Aslam Watanjar was the Army commander on the ground during the coup, and his troops gained control of Kabul. Colonel Abdul Qadir, the leader of the Air Force squadrons, also launched a major attack on the Arg Presidential Palace, in the course of which Mohammed Daoud Khan was killed. Watanjar was present when corpses of the president and his family were buried in a pit.

Colonel Watanjar was also in charge of the announcement over Radio Kabul, in the Pashtu language, that a Revolutionary Council of the Armed Forces had been established. The council's initial statement of principles, issued late in the evening of April 27, was a noncommittal affirmation of Islamic, democratic, and non-aligned ideals.

Watanjar would lead a pro Taraki military clique during a inter-Khalq power struggle between pro Taraki and pro Amin factions.

He was in charge of the operation until Amin took over from him in the evening. On April 30 the RC issued the first of a series of fateful decrees. The decree formally abolished the military's revolutionary council.

== Role in the Khalq and Parcham governments ==
Following the coup, Watanjar was appointed deputy prime minister and minister of communications. Later he served successively as minister of the interior, of defense, and again of the interior until he joined others in a plot against Amin.

The Herat uprising also set off a new round in the Afghan regime's internal power struggle. To assuage charges of weak performance in the military leadership, Taraki finally granted Watanjar the position of Minister of Defense.

Watanjar's move to take over the Defense Ministry was a demonstrable exploitation of Amin's vulnerability in the aftermath of the failings of the army. However, by July 1979, Amin took over the defense portfolio, replacing him on the grounds that he was a Taraki-sympathizer.

Aslam Watanjar joined forces with Sarwari, Gulabzoy and others Khalqis in a plot against then Prime Minister Hafizullah Amin.

Except for Sarwari, who was from the province of Ghazni, the others were from Paktia. They had influence with the army, which was officered by a considerable number of persons from Paktia.

Until their break with Amin, Sarwari was head of the Intelligence Department (AGSA), while the others were cabinet ministers. At first close friends of Amin, they later turned against him, siding with President Nur Mohammad Taraki in opposition to Amin.

When Amin overcame them, they took refuge in the Soviet embassy along with Sarwari and Gulabzoy.

The presence in Soviet Red Army of Sarwari, Watanjar, and Gulabzoy might have influenced the officers not to respond to the invasion. Along with them, he served as a guide for the Soviets.

After the invasion he was promoted to membership in the central committee and the Revolutionary Council and was appointed Minister of Communications. In June 1981 he was added to the Politburo.

Later he served successively as Minister of Defense and again of the Interior.

He also headed the official Afghan delegation to Baikonur, in his position of communications minister and member of its ruling Politburo.

On March 6, 1990, General Watanjar intercepted a tank battalion of Shahnawaz Tanai during Tanai's coup attempt, which eventually failed. Watanjar was awarded a four-star rank by President Najibullah and also made Secretary of Defense.

After the fall of Kabul and the collapse of President Najibullah's government, he left the country.

== Later life and death ==
Initially, Aslam Watanjar and his family lived in Moscow, where they did not own any flat and lived without residence permit or income. When Watanjar was expelled from the flat, he moved to Ukraine.

On 24 November 2000, Watanjar died of cancer while in exile, in the Ukrainian city of Odesa. He was 54.

== Notes ==
Political offices
Preceded by Abdul Qadir	Minister of Defense; May 1978 – August 1978	Succeeded by Hafizullah Amin
Preceded by Shahnawaz Tanai	Minister of Defense; March 1990 – April 1992	Succeeded by Ahmed Shah Massoud
