= Khalq =

Faction of the People's Democratic Party of Afghanistan

Khalq خلق
- Leader: Nur Muhammad Taraki (1965–1979); Hafizullah Amin (1979); Shahnawaz Tanai (1979–1990)
- Founder: Nur Muhammad Taraki
- Founded: 1 January 1965 (61 years, 316 days)
- Dissolved: 1990 (36 years, 252 days)
- Newspaper: Khalq (1966)
- Ideology: Communism; Marxism-Leninism; Pashtun nationalism Pashtun irredentism Pashtunization; Left-wing nationalism Factions: Stalinism
- Political position: Far-left
- National affiliation: People's Democratic Party of Afghanistan
- Colors: Red and Gold

Party flag

The Khalq (Note: Pashto: خلق) (lit. 'masses' or 'people') was a far-left faction of the People's Democratic Party of Afghanistan (PDPA) and ruled the Democratic Republic of Afghanistan from April 1978 to December 1979. Its historical de facto leaders were Nur Muhammad Taraki and (1967–1979), Hafizullah Amin (1979). It was also the name of the leftist newspaper produced by the same movement. The Khalq wing was formed in 1967 after the split of the party due to bitter resentment with the rival Parcham faction which had a differing revolutionary strategy.

It was made up primarily of Pashtuns from rural backgrounds. Its leaders preferred a mass organization approach and advocated class struggle to overthrow the system to bring about political, economic and social changes. They would rule the Democratic Republic of Afghanistan that was formed as a result of the Saur Revolution in 1978. The Khalqists introduced radical reforms and carried out brutal crackdowns on dissent turning Afghanistan into a police state run by the AGSA (and later KAM). The Khalqist crackdowns encouraged the rebellion of the religious and ethnic minority segments present in the Afghan society, which led more people joining exiled Islamist parties in Pakistan, however these rebellions did not pose an existential threat to their rule due to Khalq's large support base within the Armed Forces and the rebellion not being nationwide with provinces such as Helmand having no rebel activity. Khalqist rule would be ended following the Soviet invasion of Afghanistan in December 1979 which overthrew Hafizullah Amin and started the Soviet-Afghan War.

== Early political history ==
The People's Democratic Party of Afghanistan held its First Congress on 1 January 1965. Twenty-seven men gathered at Nur Mohammed Taraki's house in Kabul, elected Taraki PDPA Secretary General, Babrak Karmal as Deputy Secretary General, and chose a five-member Central Committee (or Politburo).

In the late 1950s and early 1960s, Hafizullah Amin, who was involved in training teachers, used his position to raise the political conscious of these teachers and students, producing dramas and political sketches which he published under a pseudonym. Amin also held conferences where he could directly talk to participants. In 1961 he was involved in a teachers conference in Kandahar which gave him direct access to the men and women responsible for education in the province. This laid the ground work for Khalq's support base in rural Pashtun areas as well as in Kabul among Amin's former students. Amin believed that radicalization of Afghan teachers was the first step to radicalize the youth of the rural masses into supporting the Khalqist cause. Using his position he was able to radicalize a generation of Afghan teachers. The Khalqists also educated nomadic Pashtun Kochis. Hafizullah Amin was the only Khalqi member of the PDPA to be elected to Parliament in 1969.

=== Khalq – Parcham division of the PDPA ===
The party was divided by bitter, and sometimes violent, internal rivalries. The Khalq faction was more tribal and militant, whereas the Parcham had more support among the urban population and middle classes. Especially on the ideological level, Karmal and Taraki differed in their perceptions of Afghanistan's revolutionary potential:

- Taraki believed that revolution could be achieved in the classical Leninist fashion by building a tightly disciplined working-class party.
- Karmal felt that Afghanistan was too undeveloped for a Leninist strategy and that a national democratic front of patriotic and anti-imperialist forces had to be fostered in order to bring the country a step closer to socialist revolution.

The newspaper was highly successful, especially among students. Its first edition sold 20,000 copies, and later editions numbered around 10,000 (there were only six editions altogether). On 23 May 1966, the authorities closed Khalq on the grounds that it was anti-Islamic, anticonstitutional, and antimonarchical. Karmal's faction founded Parcham, a weekly magazine that he published between March 1968 and July 1969. Parcham was shut down in June 1969 on the eve of parliamentary elections.

=== The Republican coup of 1973 ===
Khalq was excluded from the new government because of its lack of good political connections and its go-it-alone policy on noncooperation. Taraki did advocate a united front briefly after former Prime Minister Mohammad Daoud Khan's takeover in an attempt to gain places in the government for his followers, but this effort was unsuccessful. The Khalqists claimed to be more leftist and more independent of the Soviet Union than Parcham, but their base of support was not as strong within Kabul, and much stronger in the military and rural areas.

In 1973, the Khalq faction energetically began to encourage military personnel to join them. Taraki had been in charge of Khalq activity in the military. In 1973 he passed his recruitment duties to Amin. This move was highly successful: by the time of the communist coup, in April 1978, Khalq outnumbered Parcham by a factor of two or three to one. The Moscow-sponsored union of Parcham and Khalq may have been in preparation for his peaceful passage from the scene in the near future. The merger of Parcham and Khalq rapidly became unglued. However, Mir Akbar Khyber, a prominent leftist, was killed by the government and his associates. Although the government issued a statement deploring the assassination, the PDPA leaders feared that Daoud was planning to exterminate them all.

On the eve of the communist coup, Hafizullah Amin was the only member of the Central Committee that was not arrested. The police did not send him to immediate imprisonment, as it did with Politburo members of the PDPA on 25 April 1978. He was the last person to be arrested, his imprisonment was postponed for five hours, during which time Amin, without having the authority and while the Politburo members were in prison, instructed the Khalqi army officers to overthrow the government.

The Khalqist Army cells prepared for a massive uprising. On 27 April, the Khalqist military leaders began the revolution by proclaiming to the cells in the armed forces that the time for revolution had arrived. Khalqist Colonel Mohammad Aslam Watanjar was the Army commander on the ground during the coup, and his troops gained control of Kabul. Colonel Abdul Qadir, the leader of the Air Force squadrons, also launched a major attack on the Royal Palace, in the course of which President Mohammad Daoud Khan and most of his family, including women and children, were assassinated.

== Khalq as Government (April 1978 – December 1979) ==
The Saur Revolution, as the new government labeled its coup d'état (after the month in the Persian calendar in which it occurred), was almost entirely the achievement of the Khalq faction of the PDPA. Khalq's victory was partially due to Daoud's miscalculation that Parcham was the more serious threat. This success gave it effective control over the armed forces, a great advantage over its Parchami rival. During the first months of the revolution, Cabinet membership was split eleven to ten, with Khalq in the majority.

Nur Muhammad Taraki's official portrait

Initially, the revolutionary government of Khalq had a period of acceptance from the Afghan populace partly due to its land reform program. Nur Muhammad Taraki brought up the issue of Pashtunistan during his first press conference on May 6, 1978. In May 1979, Pakistani President Zia Al Haq expressed his concerns to US President Jimmy Carter regarding the Khalq Regime's stance towards the Durand Line citing article 8 of the PDPA's manifesto. The new Khalqist leadership in Kabul continued to not recognize the Durand Line as the international border between Afghanistan and Pakistan, instead Taraki and Hafizullah Amin pushed for the idea of a Pashtun led, "Greater Afghanistan". Taraki would raise the idea of a Greater Afghanistan extending to the sea and training the army to act in this region, against Pakistan to Soviet Premier Lenoid Brezhnev arguing that in doing so the Soviet Union could reach the Strait of Hormuz and gain access to the Indian Ocean through Afghanistan, and that the people of these regions viewed Pakistan as "foreign", stating that

“We must not leave the Pashtun and Baluch (of Pakistan) in the hands of the imperialists, Already now it would be possible to launch a national liberation struggle amongst these tribes and include the Pashtun and Baluch regions in Afghanistan.”

In August 1978, Hafizullah Amin told Soviet Ambassador Alexander Puzanov and Soviet Major General L.N. Gorelov

“We are not parading the question of Pashtunistan and Baluchistan in the press although this question is still on the agenda. The territory of Afghanistan must reach to the shores of the Gulf of Oman and the Indian Ocean. We wish to see the sea with our own eyes.”

In December 1978, on a visit to Moscow, Soviet Premier Leonid Brezhnev attempted to talk to Taraki through Stanislav Gavrilov, the advisor of the Afghan Department of the Soviet Ministry of Foreign Affairs, who translated Brezhnev's words into Dari as had been done before the Sawr Revolution, however Taraki pretended not to understand Dari and what was being said. When negotiations between the Soviets and Afghans began Taraki declared that

"We members of the delegation that have arrived in the friendly Soviet Union, are Afghans. To be more precise we are Pashtuns. This is why we would like Pashto to be used in this remarkable setting. As far as I know, your interpreters do not speak Pashto. This is why we have included a Pashtun officer in our delegation who has studied in your country and is fluent in Russian."

On the second day of the visit to Moscow, Hafizullah Amin brought up the issue of Pashtunistan to Aleksey Nikolayevich Kosygin, stating the history of Afghan territory was annexed by the British after the Second Anglo-Afghan war, leaving millions of Pashtuns outside of Afghanistan and under foreign rule. Amin claimed that if they did not act, the new Zia Ul Haq regime in Pakistan would send terrorists into Afghanistan. Taraki and Amin concluded that Zia Ul Haq's government was in a weak position and that Afghanistan could exploit the situation by arming the Pashtun and Baluch tribes. However to do so they needed financial support, arms, ammunition, transportation and communications equipment. Taraki claimed that if the Soviets provided those, Afghanistan itself would assume responsibility for delivering material support to the Pashtun rebels. Kosygin concluded that Taraki's refusal to speak in Dari as a way to present himself as a "Pashtunist" and that the key topic of his and Amin's visit to Moscow was Pashtunistan, with the Friendship Treaty serving as a formality.

In 1979 under General Secretary Nur Muhammad Taraki the Khalqist regime changed the official map to include NWFP and Balochistan as new "frontier provinces" of the Democratic Republic of Afghanistan. Hafizullah Amin took over as Chairman of the Ministers Council (prime minister) in March 1979, retaining the position of field marshal and becoming vice-president of the Supreme Defence Council. Taraki remained General Secretary of the People's Democratic Party, Chairman of the Revolutionary Council and in control of the Army, though now he reportedly devoted a lot of his time at the Royal Palace, which had been renamed the People's Palace. In May 1979, Radio Afghanistan started creating Anti-Pakistan songs with one song having the refrain "We shall march against Pakistan.", while another song contained the lyrics "everyone who wishes to create division between the Muslim khalqa of Afghanistan and Pakistan will be annihilated", "why are these black deeds being done against us from Pakistan?", "our soldiers will fight if they are attacked", "the dal-aw-chapatis (a pejorative term used by Pashtuns for a Punjabi, who are the ethnic majority of Pakistan) and the lunatics cannot harm us."

While addressing tribal leaders on 29th July 1979, Amin declared that

"All nationalities from the Oxus to the Abasin are brothers from one homeland. The waves of bravery of the Pashtuns and Baluchis of the whole region is reflected in the revolutionary emotions of the toilers here... our revolution is revered and welcomed from the Oxus to the Abasin... from the mountains of the Pamirs to the beaches of Gwadar in Baluchistan"

Events also tended to sub-divide the protagonists. The intense rivalry between Taraki and Amin within the Khalq faction heated up. In September 1979, Taraki's followers, with Soviet complicity, had made several attempts on Amin's life. The final attempt backfired resulting in the death of one of Amin's close friends. Amin's murder of Taraki allowed him to purge his opponents and fully consolidate power within the Afghan Armed Forces suffering only one mutiny by the 7th Infantry Division at Rishkur on 15–16 October which was done by Anti-Amin elements of his own party. The quick suppression of the rebellion according to American intelligence, demonstrated that Amin maintained the loyalty of key armoured units in Kabul region as well as the airforce. In October 1979, Hafizullah Amin, now the leader of Afghanistan brought up the issue of Greater Afghanistan again saying

“Our task is to direct the officers and soldiers and all the Afghan people to the Durand line which we do not recognize, and then to the valley of the Indus which must be our border. If we do not fulfill this historic task, then one can say that we have been working in vain. We must have an outlet to the Indian Ocean!”

In Mid-October, ethnic Hazara rebels briefly seized the town of Bamiyan; however it was taken back by Amin's forces after heavy fighting. In late October, Amin made a successful military sweep against the insurgents, driving many of them across the border into Pakistan. At the end of 1979 there were 400,000 Afghan refugees, mostly in Pakistan. According to American intelligence the rebels were poorly equipped and incapable of standing "toe-to-toe" with the Afghan military. Amin's regime was noted at being capable of retaking lost territory from the rebels when it directed its forces in order to do so, allowing Amin to control most of the important parts of Afghanistan by November 1979. The USSR claims it had attempted to temper what it described as "Khalqis' radicalism", urging attendance at mosques, inclusion of Parchamis (Who did not have widespread support amongst the armed forces or general population compared to Khalq) and non-communists in the government, and a halt to the unpopular land reform movement. The Soviets and their Parchamite allies claim most of this advice was ignored. The last Khalq leader, Hafizullah Amin, was assassinated after Soviet intelligence forces took control of the government and installed Babrak Karmal, a Parchami, in his place.

== The Soviet invasion and Parcham government (December 1979 – April 1989) ==
Khalqi-Parchami differences began to rend the military as Khalqi leaders, fearful that the Parchamis retained their cellular organization within the military, mounted massive purges of Parchamis. Thanks to Amin's efforts in the 1970s, the officer corps consisted largely of Khalqis. However following his overthrow many of the politically reliable Khalqi officers mutinied against the newly installed Parchamite Barbrak Karmal and his Soviet sponsors.

As a result of the previous purging of Parchamis from the Armed Forces which had been already dominated by Khalqis before the purge, the Soviets had no choice but to rely upon Khalqi officers to rebuild the army. Khalq officers and men expressed bitterness over the preferential treatment given their Parcham rivals by the Parcham dominated regime. Disaffected Khalqis often assisted the Mujahideen. Khalqis in the armed forces often accused their Parchami officers of using them as cannon fodder and complained that young Parchami men were exempted from compulsory military service. A show of this was that, in 1980, at the April military parade celebrating the Saur Revolution, many Tank Corps continued to display the Red Flag of Khalq, instead of the new national flag adopted by Babrak Karmal.

There were also further differences within Khalq between the loyalists of Taraki and those of Amin. Asadullah Sarwari and Sayed Mohammad Gulabzoy were part of a pro-Taraki military clique, calling itself the "principled Khalqis". They clashed heads several times with the government of Karmal.

== Post Soviet-Withdrawal (1989–present) ==
=== Najibullah Administration (1986–1992) ===
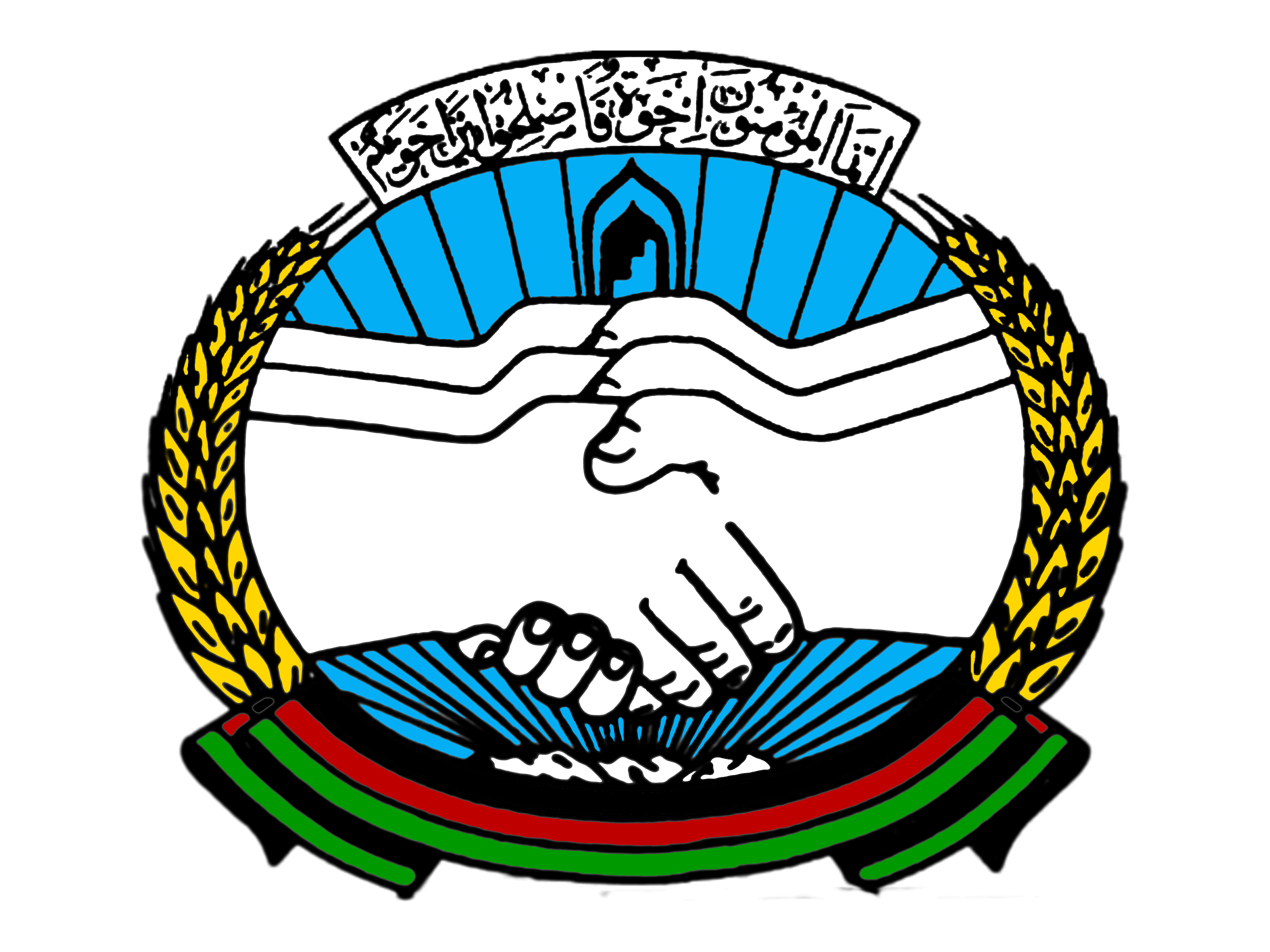
In 1990 the PDPA was transformed into the Homeland Party

After the 40th Soviet Army left the country, PDPA General Secretary and President Mohammad Najibullah suffered, to a lesser degree, the same disadvantage that Karmal had when he was installed as General Secretary of the PDPA by the Soviets. This fact was shown by the fierceness of the resistance to Najibullah's appointment within the Parcham faction which would be referred to as "Karmalist" by the pro-Najibullah Watan Party of Afghanistan years later. This split persisted, forcing PDPA leader Najibullah to straddle his politics between whatever Parchami support he could maintain and alliances he could win from the Khalqists which whom he shared the Pashtun ethnicity.

In December 1989, 127 Khalqist military officers were arrested for an attempted coup. Twenty-seven officers escaped and later showed up at a press conference with Gulbuddin Hekmatyar in Peshawar. Former Minister of Tribal Affairs, Bacha Gul Wafadar and Minister of Civil Aviation Hasan Sharq were among the conspirators. In March 1990, once again the Mujahideen leader Gulbuddin Hekmatyar cooperated in a coup attempt, this time led by the Khalqist Defense minister Shahnawaz Tanai. Tanai was apparently also supported by those important Khalqist who remained in the Politburo, Assadullah Sarwary and Mohammad Gulabzoi, respectively their country's envoys to Aden and Moscow. They were said to have been intimately connected with the coup and with Gen. Tanai. However, Tanai had no direct control of troops inside Kabul. The plot misfired and failed because of faulty communications. Sarwary and Gulabzoi were both expelled immediately from the party.

=== Afghan Civil War (1992–2001) ===
At the end, however, the former Khalqists either joined or allied themselves with the Taliban or other Mujahideen warlords after the collapse of President Najibullah's Government in April 1992. A perfect example of this was that, once Kabul was captured, Gulbuddin Hekmatyar gained the support of the majority Pashtun Khalqist hardliners, including the Minister of Internal Affairs Raz Mohammad Paktin and then Defence Minister Mohammad Aslam Watanjar. Another example of this is the fact that Gen. Tanai (according to western diplomatic sources) provided the Taliban a skilled cadre of military officers. The Khalqis also ran the Taliban's small air force and military artillery and tanks.

In this way, the Khalqi faction were once again involved in the war, using his pilots to fly the Mig-21 and Sukhoi fighters of what was left of the Afghan Air Force, driving Soviet Tanks and using Soviet Artillery. With no central government and fighting for different groups, Khalq was merely a pawn in the Afghan Civil War between the Afghan Northern Alliance and the Taliban.

=== War In Afghanistan (2001-2021) ===
After the fall of the Taliban in 2001, the presence of US forces in the province of Khost led to significant changes in the power dynamics of the region. As military units operated in the area, they sought alliances with like-minded individuals who shared their immediate goals. In a peculiar turn of events, the power vacuum created by the Taliban's defeat allowed former communists, who were once adversaries of the United States during the 1980s, to rise to power. These individuals, being staunchly anti-Taliban, became valuable allies to the US and Coalition partners in the region. This unexpected shift in power dynamics set the stage for the establishment of the Khost Protection Force (KPF), a paramilitary group that would play a significant role in the security landscape of Khost province.

Other Khalqists had developed fairly close relations with the Hamid Karzai regime after the defeat of the Taliban.

- General Babrak Shinwari, former head of the youth affairs section of the PDPA under Taraki and Amin, who migrated to Peshawar in Pakistan in the winter of 1992. He later helped found the Afghanistan-Pakistan People Friendship Society and was elected member of the Loya Jirga by a council of elders from Nazyan Shinwari area of Nangarhar province.

== Prominent members ==
- Nur Muhammad Taraki
- Hafizullah Amin
- Shahnawaz Tanai
- Muhammad Aslam Watanjar
- Sayed Muhammad Gulabzoy

== See also ==
- Saur Revolution
- 1990 Afghan coup d'état attempt
- Parcham
- People's Democratic Party of Afghanistan
