= Settam-e-Melli =

Afghan political movement beginning in the late 1970s

Against National Oppression Party ستم ملی
- Leader: Tahir Badakhshi (1967–1979)
- Founder: Tahir Badakhshi; Ghulam Dastagir Panjsheri
- Founded: 1966 or 1968
- Split from: People's Democratic Party of Afghanistan (Parcham)
- Merged into: Guruh-i Kar
- Succeeded by: National Islamic Movement of Afghanistan
- Ideology: Socialism; Marxism–Leninism–Maoism; Anti-Pashtun sentiment Secularism; Tajik and Turkic interests
- Political position: Left-wing
- National affiliation: Shola-e Javid

The Revolutionary Organisation of the Working People of Afghanistan, (Note: Dari: سازمان انقلابی مردم زحمتکش افغانستان) also called the Against National Oppression Party, (Note: Dari: حزب مبارزه با ستم ملی) more commonly known as Settam-e Melli, (Note: Transliterations include Setam-i-Milli', Setami Milli, Setam-i-Meli, Setam-e-Meli, Setami-i-Milli and Setame Melli.) was a political movement in Afghanistan, led by Tahir Badakhshi. The organization was affiliated with the Non-Aligned Movement, and was opposed by both the Afghan monarchy and by the Soviet-aligned People's Democratic Party of Afghanistan. Its followers were mostly Persian speakers. Most of its members were non-Pashtuns—Tajik, Uzbek, and other minorities—and it has been variously described as an anti-Pashtun separatist group and as a Tajik and Uzbek separatist group. "Information on Settam-e-Melli is vague and contradictory, but it appears to have been an anti-Pashtun leftist mutation." The group was founded in 1968 by Tahir Badakhshi, an intellectual, author, political activist who formerly had been a founder of the People's Democratic Party of Afghanistan and split with the party. The group emphasized "militant class struggle and mass mobilization of peasants" and recruited Tajiks, Uzbeks, Hazaras and other minorities from Kabul and the northeastern provinces.

During the communist ruling of Taraki-Amin period, the organisation members withdrew to the countryside to resist against the tyranny, though as an urban movement this removed them from their powerbase. Almost 4000 members had been arrested by the communist regime and killed. Later on, during the 1979–1986 rule of Babrak Karmal, the organisation rehabilitated itself and became closer with the government. A Setami leader, Bashir Baghlani, went over to the government in 1983, and was made Minister of Justice.
