= Nawa =

Nawa may refer to:

== Places ==
- NAWA, abbreviation of "North Africa and West Asia"

=== Afghanistan ===
- Nawa District, a district in Ghazni Province, Afghanistan
- Nawa, Afghanistan, a town in the central part of Nawa District, in Ghazni Province, Afghanistan
- Nawa-I-Barakzayi, a village in Nawa District of Helmand Province, Afghanistan
- Nawa-I-Barakzayi District, a district in Helmand Province, Afghanistan

=== India ===
- Nawa, Rajasthan, a city and Tehsil in Nagaur district in the Indian State of Rajasthan

=== Ivory Coast ===
- Nawa Region, a region in Bas-Sassandra District of Ivory Coast

=== Japan ===
- Nawa, Tottori, a town in Saihaku District, Tottori, Japan
- Nawa District, Gunma

=== Syria ===
- Nawa, Daraa, a city in Daraa Governorate, Syria
- Nawa, Salamiyah, a village in the Hama Governorate, Syria

=== Thailand ===
- Na Wa district in Nakhon Phanom province in northeast Thailand

=== Yemen ===
- Na'wah (Upper Yafa), a sheikhdom and dependency of Upper Yafa, modern-day Yemen

== Other uses ==
- Don Mlangeni Nawa (1959–2025), South African actor
- Zipporah Nawa, South African teacher and politician
- National Association of Women Artists, an American artist organisation
- North American Wrestling Alliance, an American professional wrestling promotion
- North American Walleye Association

== See also ==
- Amphoe Na Wa, a district in Nakhon Phanom Province, Thailand
- Maqam Nawah, a mode in the Arabic Maqam system
- Nahua (disambiguation)
