= Sulaiman Layeq =

Afghan politician, ideologue, and poet (1930–2020)

Sulaiman Layeq سليمان لايق
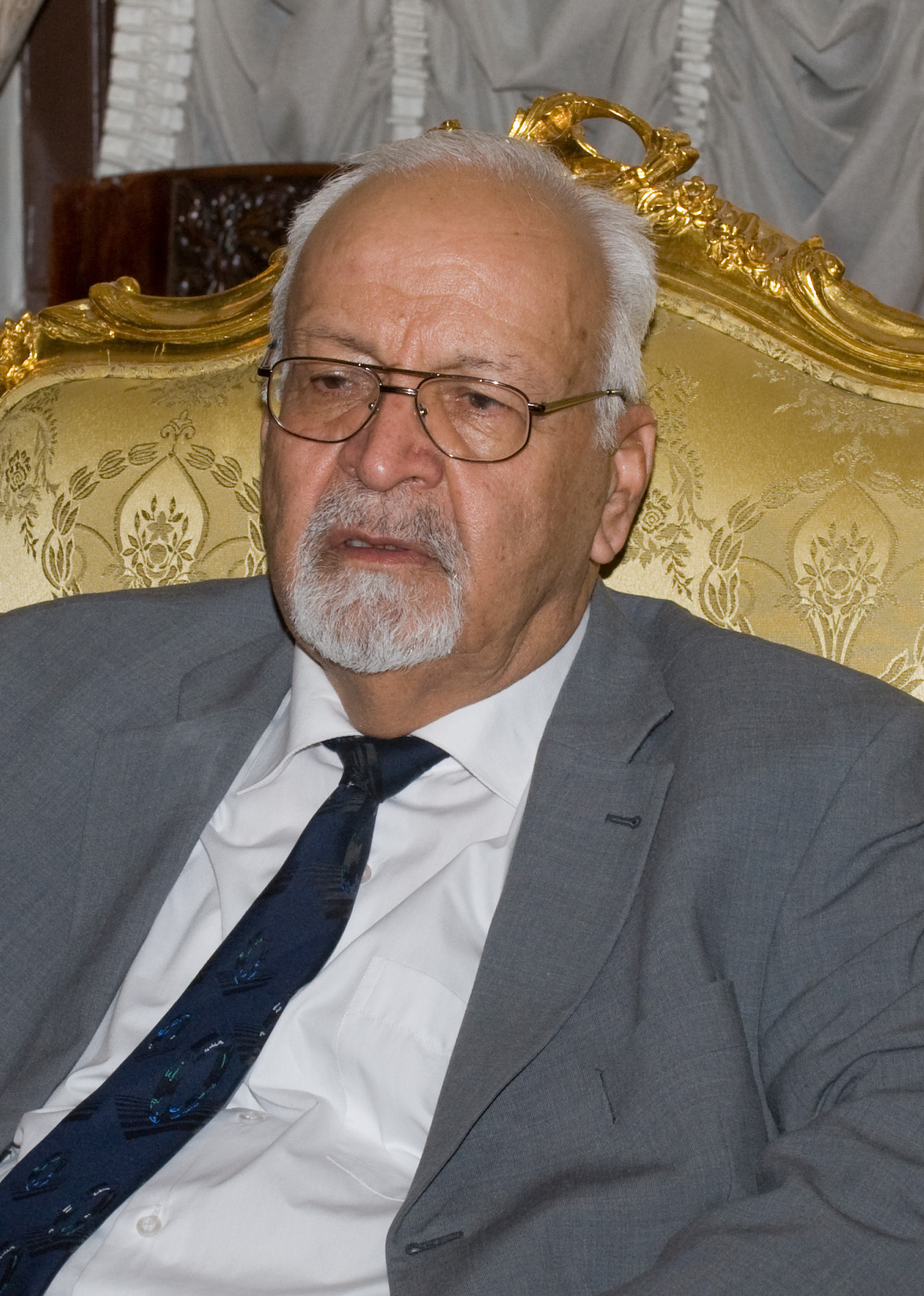
- Layeq in 2009
- Born: Ghulam Mojaddedi; 12 October 1930; Kingdom of Afghanistan
- Died: 31 July 2020 (aged 89); Germany
- Occupations: Politician and Poet
- Known for: Academia
- Political party: PDPA until 1990; Watan Party
- Spouse: Mahera
- Children: 2 daughters, 2 sons

Sulaiman Layeq (born Ghulam Mujaddid) (Dari/Pashto: سليمان لايق, sometimes also Romanised as Laeq or Laiq) (12 October 1930 – 31 July 2020) was an Afghan communist politician (belonging to the Parcham faction), ideologue and poet who held the positions of President of the Academy of Sciences, full member of the Afghan Politburo, and Minister of Nationalities and Tribal Affairs.

== Biography ==
Sulaiman Layeq was born to a Sulaimankhel Pashtun family in Sharana. His father Abdul Ghani named him Ghulam Mujaddid. Abdul Ghani was a religious tribal figure who had fought the British during the Afghan War of Independence. His father was a khalifa of the Naqshbandi Sufi order led by the influential Mojaddedi family of scholars. In 1935 his father would serve as the personal imam to Prime Minister Mohammad Hashim for the next 17 years.

Layeq's father would enroll him in the prestige Habibia High School in 1940. In 1947 Layeq attended a state-run madrasas in Paghman. It was there he adopted the name Sulaiman which was the name his mother, who died of cholera when he was young, wanted to give him. He also adopted the last name Layeq which was the name of one of his ancestors. In 1951, Layeq led a protest at the madrasas against physical harassment of students. He would be kicked out, but due to his father's connections he was able to return to the madrasas and graduate. A year later he enrolled at a Sharia course in Kabul University on the wishes of his father but was expelled the same year after being part of an anti government protest. In 1955 he was readmitted but did literature and philosophy course instead. He would graduate in 1957 and start work as a journalist initially writing for the state-owned newspaper Hewad daily in 1958. He became the head of the department of education and literature for Radio Afghanistan from 1959 to 1965 and then worked for the Ministry of Information and Culture from 1965 to 1967. When working as a journalist he became more politically active beyond just holding student protests. Around 1956 Layeq met with Mir Akbar Khyber at Bacha-ye Shahqul's (son of Shahqul's) Café. Khyber had studied at Kabul's Military Academy but was jailed for his activities related to the Weekh Zalmian as members of the military were banned from being politically active. At this point political discussions started emerging and with the 1963 constitution legalizing political parties many of these discussions merged into the People's Democratic Party of Afghanistan.

In 1965, 27 participants met at Nur Muhammad Taraki's house during the "founding congress" where they elected the central committee of the PDPA. Layeq initially was not a member of the central committee, but he would become an alternate central committee member in 1966. In 1965 Layeq would unsuccessfully run for Parliament for Pol-e-Khomri. In 1967 due to a rift in the party caused by political and personal differences, the PDPA split into the Parcham (banner) and Khalq (People) factions. Layeq followed Khyber and joined the Parcham faction. In 1969 Layeq would again attempt to run for parliament however leaflets were distributed in Baghlan calling Layeq a apostate for his work for the Parcham newspaper. Layeq's father also was sent a leaflet which did not amuse him. The leaflets were distributed by an Islamist group associated with Gulbuddin Hekmatyar which would later evolve into the Hezb-e Islami paramilitary group which would fight the Afghan Government forces, the Soviets in the 80s and later the Americans in the 2000s and 2010s.

Layeq also hung around other political circles including the emerging Islamist movements which initially included many socialist thinkers. Layeq's Sharia studies and family ties led him to be accepted by these groups. Layeq's sister would marry Sibghatullah Mojaddedi (the future President of Afghanistan) who would later become a Mujahedeen leader. Another one of Layeq's sisters was married to his friend Mir Akbar Khyber. Layeq would continue to expand his political circles throughout his life even attending a Hezb-e Islami congress (breakaway faction from Hekmatyar's Hezb-e Islami) in 2001.

In July 1977 the Khalq and Parcham factions reunited back into the PDPA after Soviet persuasion and mediation from the Indian Communist Party and the Iranian Tudeh Party as well as the mainly Pashtun, Awami National Party. In 1978 Layeq's mentor and friend Khyber was assassinated, blame has been put on many people including Gulbuddin Hekmatyar, Daoud Khan, Iran's Savak, The Soviets, Hafizullah Amin, or even Parcham themselves (although this is unlikely). Layeq would later claim that Khyber was against using violence as a means to take power and that there was a circle within the PDPA that was aiming for a military takeover. However some say Khyber was in charge of the Parcham factions recruitment from the military. Following Khyber's assassination, tens of thousands of people poured the streets for the funeral which turned into a protest march against the President Daoud Khan. Daoud Khan arrested many leading members of the PDPA, Layeq would turn himself into the authorities. During the arrests Hafizullah Amin, the leader of the Khalq factions underground military network ordered pro-PDPA officers to overthrow the government before being arrested leading to the Saur Revolution. Following the revolution Layeq and the rest of the jailed PDPA members were released driving to Radio Afghanistan to announce the victory. Layeq would become the Minister for Radio and TV in the first PDPA government cabinet. Layeq would write the National anthem of the Democratic Republic of Afghanistan.

The unity between the Khalqists and Parchamites did not last however as the Khalqist government led by Nur Muhammad Taraki and his deputy Hafizullah Amin accused the Parchamites of being part of a larger conspiracy involving the United States, Iran, the Saudis, and China. Most Parchamites were either jailed or exiled as the Khalqists consolidated power. In 1978, Layeq initially only lost his post and seat in the politburo but in March 1979 Layeq was arrested and sentenced to death. He was sent to the infamous Pul-e-Charkhi prison in Kabul. The relationship between Hafizullah Amin and Taraki started to worsen as Amin moved to consolidate power. The Soviets worried that Hafizullah Amin was a part of the American CIA helped Taraki with an attempt to assassinate Amin. Amin was shot in the arm however he managed to drive to the Military headquarters and put the army on high alert ordering the arrest of Taraki. Taraki would later be executed through suffocation. The death of Taraki shocked Soviet leader Leonid Brezhnev and led to him finally sending troops to Afghanistan after refusing multiple requests from Taraki. Hafizullah Amin was killed during Storm-333 in December 1979 and many of the jailed Parchamites including Layeq were freed from prison. In April 1980 the Parchamite government under Babrak Karmal adopted a new flag and constitution, Layeq would become the chair of the country’s Academy of Sciences. He also returned to the PDPA's central committee as an alternate member and became the deputy chairman of the National Fatherland Front. His most important role however was his position as Minister for Tribal and Border Affairs from 1981 until 1989.

In 1985 the Soviets appointed Mikhail Gorbachev as the leader of the Soviet Union. In October of that year Layeq was awoken early in the morning by a Soviet advisor who told him to come to the airport, there flew to Moscow and met the new Soviet leader. Gorbachev talked about the not official decision to withdraw and urged them to form a coalition government with the Mujahedeen. Karmal was pressured to step down. Layeq was considered to become the next leader however instead KhAD head Mohammad Najibullah would ascent to the top. Layeq's ministry would be of great importance to the new Afghan President Mohammad Najibullah's reconciliation policy. The goal was to win over the more moderate elements of the Mujahedeen for a power sharing deal. Layeq rose to the top of the Politburo as a full member in 1986. Dr Najibullah's reconciliation policy made Layeq an important member of the PDPA and when the party was renamed the Homeland Party and dropped most of its leftist ideology Layeq became one of its 3 deputy leaders.

Layeq's good connections with various Pashtun tribes in both Afghanistan and Pakistan as well as his relations with Pashtun Nationalist parties in Pakistan allowed Layeq to talk to tribal elders and convince smaller Mujahedeen leaders to laydown arms. In 1989 he led negotiations with Hezbi Islami in Baghdad and Tripoli that were arranged by PLO head Yassar Arafat and Libya's Gaddafi. Both attempts for a truce failed as did another mission he led in the United States in early 1992.

Layeq died in Germany on July 31, 2020. The government gave him military honors and flew him back to Afghanistan. According to The New York Times quoting Layeq's second son Zmarak, Layeq left behind around 70 volumes of unpublished political diaries.

== Books ==
- Chunghar چونغر
- De Abaseen Spaiday د اباسين سپېدې
- Kaygday کېږدۍ
- Qeesay Aw Afsanay قصې او افسانې

== See also ==
- National anthem of the Democratic Republic of Afghanistan
- Parcham
- Khalq

Political offices
Preceded by Unknown	Minister for radio and television 1978 – 1979	Succeeded by Unknown
Preceded by Unknown	Minister of Foreign Affairs; 1981 – ?	Succeeded by Unknown
