= List of top leaders of the Democratic Republic of Afghanistan =

List of effective leaders of the DRA

Top Leader Effective Leader
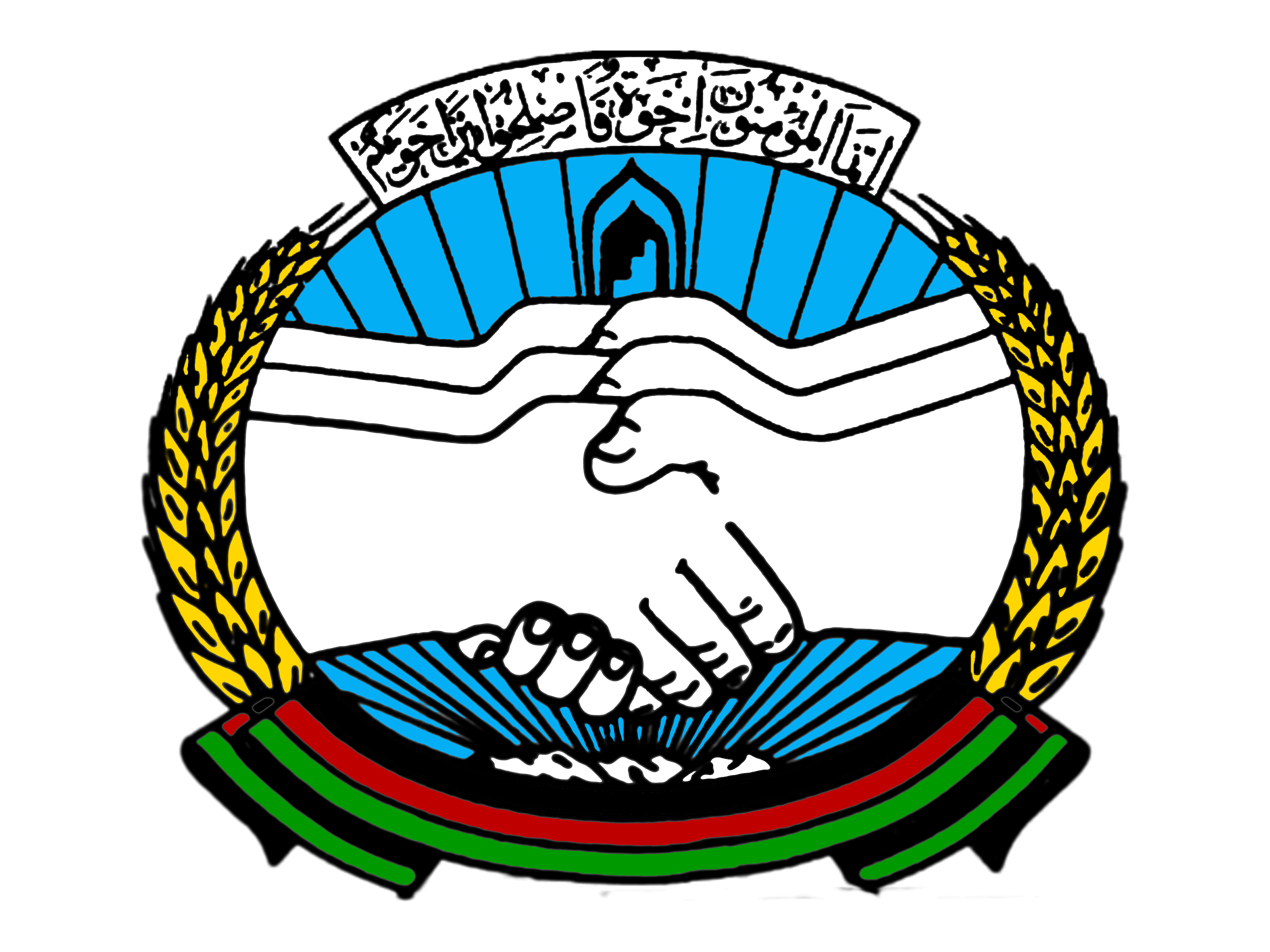

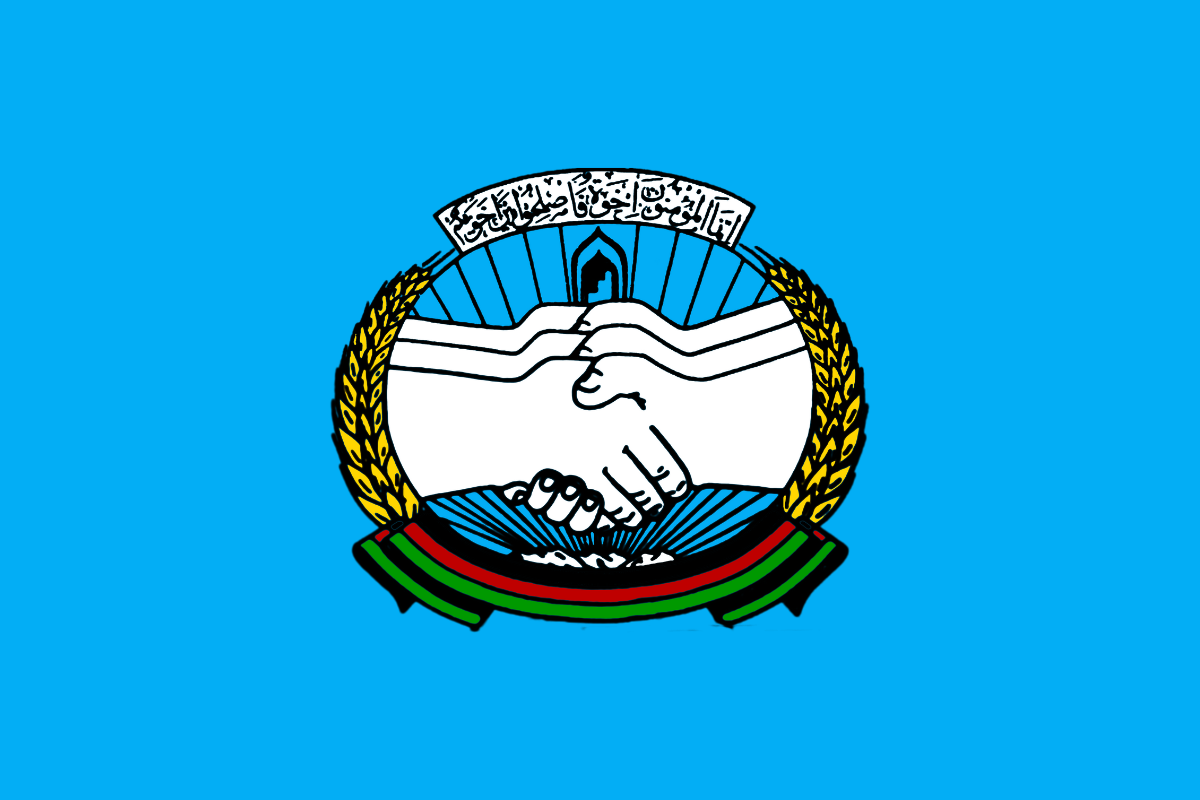

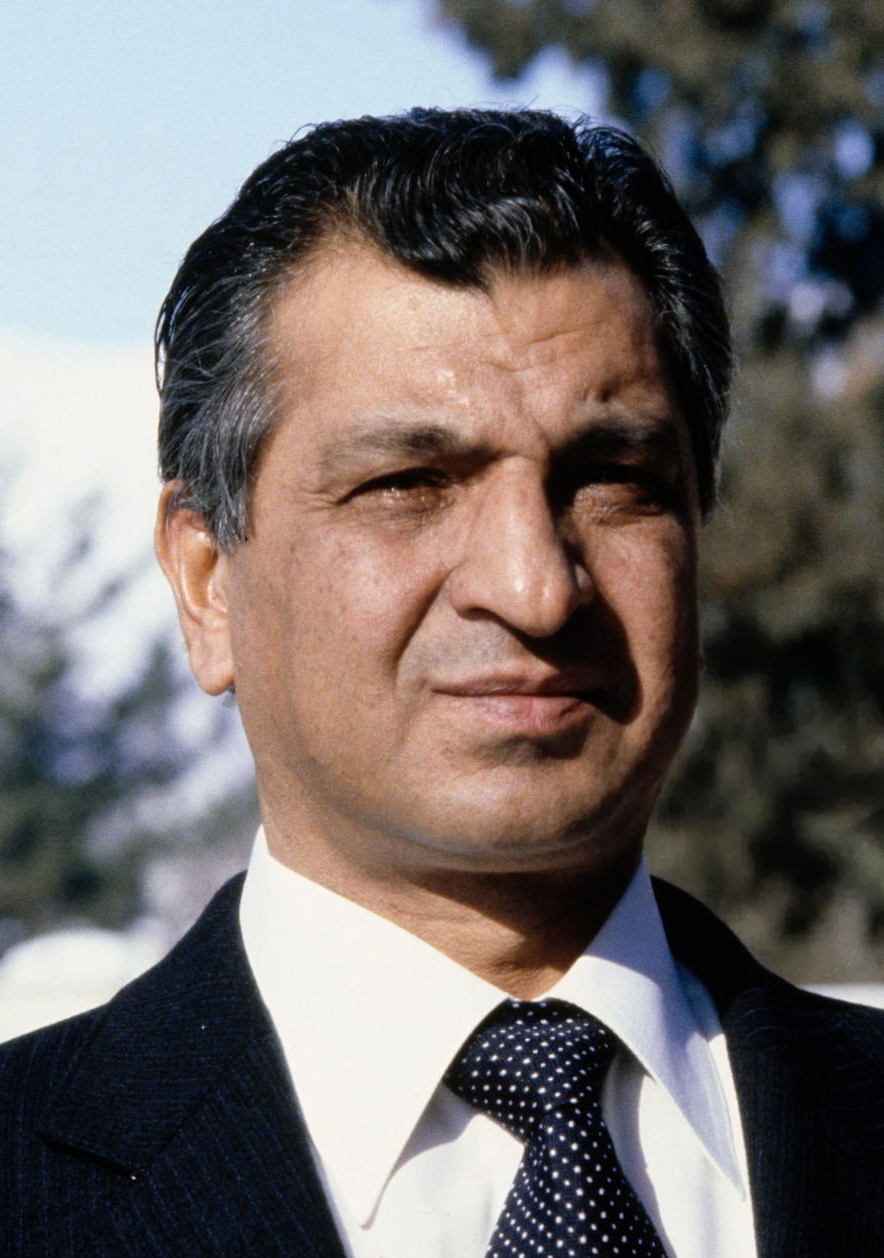
- Longest in role Babrak Karmal; 27 December 1979 – 4 May 1986
- Type: De facto leader
- Status: Informal term for the most important political figure of the Democratic Republic of Afghanistan/Republic of Afghanistan (Note: The top leader/effective leader was not a formal position nor an office unto itself.)
- Formation: April 30, 1978; 48 years ago
- First holder: Nur Muhammad Taraki
- Final holder: Mohammad Najibullah Ahmadzai
- Abolished: April 16, 1992; 34 years ago

The Top Leader of Afghanistan or also Effective Leader was an informal term for the most important political figure of the Democratic Republic of Afghanistan/Republic of Afghanistan, the top leader was not necessarily Chairman of the Presidium of the Revolutionary Council/President or Prime Minister but most of the time the General Secretary of the People's Democratic Party of Afghanistan/Homeland Party. As the DRA adopted Leninist policies like democratic centralism, the PDPA had a monopoly on power and with it the supreme political power was in the hands of the Politburo from 1979 on, besides that the Revolutionary Council, was per constitution the supreme state power, due this, it's get described as a "rubber-stamp body".

== List ==
No.	Portrait	Name (Birth–Death)	Term of office			Party (Faction)	Head of State	Head of Government	References
No.	Portrait	Name (Birth–Death)	Took office	Left office	Time in office	Party (Faction)	Head of State	Head of Government	References
1		Nur Muhammad Taraki نور محمد ترکی (1917–1979)	30 April 1978	27 March 1979	331 days	People's Democratic Party of Afghanistan (Khalq)	Himself	Himself	
2		Nur Muhammad Taraki نور محمد ترکی (1917–1979) and Hafizullah Amin حفيظ الله امين (1929–1979)	27 March 1979	14 September 1979	171 days	People's Democratic Party of Afghanistan (Khalq)	Nur Muhammad Taraki	Hafizullah Amin	
3		Hafizullah Amin حفيظ الله امين (1929–1979)	14 September 1979	27 December 1979	104 days	People's Democratic Party of Afghanistan (Khalq)	Himself	Himself	
4		Babrak Karmal بَبرَک کارمَل (1929–1996)	27 December 1979	4 May 1986	6 years, 128 days	People's Democratic Party of Afghanistan (Parcham)	Himself	Himself; Sultan Ali Keshtmand	
5		Mohammad Najibullah Ahmadzai محمد نجیب‌الله احمدزی (1947–1996)	4 May 1986	16 April 1992	5 years, 348 days	People's Democratic Party of Afghanistan (Parcham) Homeland Party	Babrak Karmal; Haji Mohammad Chamkani; Himself	Sultan Ali Keshtmand; Mohammad Hasan Sharq; Sultan Ali Keshtmand; Fazal Haq Khaliqyar None	
None; Military junta de facto controls the Republic of Afghanistan (16 April 1992 – 28 April 1992)

== See also ==
- Paramount leader
- De facto leader of the GDR
- List of leaders of the Soviet Union
- List of de facto leaders of the Polish People's Republic
- List of de facto rulers of the Czechoslovak Socialist Republic

== Bibliography ==
Kalinovsky, Artemy (2011). A Long Goodbye: The Soviet Withdrawal from Afghanistan. Harvard University Press. ISBN 978-0-674-05866-8.
