= Politburo of the People's Democratic Party of Afghanistan =

Former political institution in Afghanistan

The Politburo of the Central Committee of the People's Democratic Party of Afghanistan or Afghan Politburo was the policy-making organ and institution within Afghanistan's political structure when the PDPA Central Committee and the PDPA Congress were not in session. Only one politburos was formally elected; at the 1st Congress, despite this, the membership line-up was altered numerous times during the PDPA's existence.

== Historical line-up ==
=== 1st Politburo ===
Full members

- Nur Mohammed Taraki (General Secretary)
- Babrak Karmal (Deputy General Secretary)
- Sultan Ali Keshtmand
- Saleh Mohamed Zeary
- Ghulam Dastagir Panjsheri
- Tahir Badakhshi
- Sharullah Shapur

Candidate members

- Nur Ahmed Nur
- Dr. Akbar Shah-Wali
- Abdul Karil Misaq
- Suleiman Laeq
- Mohammad Hasan Bareq
- Hafizullah Amin
- Ismail Danesh
- Abdul Hakim Shara'i Jowzjani
- Abdul Majid
- Zaher Ofoq Qandahari
- Dr. Zaher

=== Poltiburo members (1984) ===
By 1984, eight of the thirteen members and alternate members of the Politburo were Parchamis:

Members of the Parcham faction

- Babrak Karmal
- Sultan Ali Keshtmand
- Mohammad Najibullah
- Nur Ahmed Nur
- Anahita Ratebzad
- Mahmud Baryalai

Members of the Khalq faction

- Abdul Qadir
- Mohammad Rafie
- Mohammad Aslam Watanjar
- Salih Muhammad Zeary
- Muhammad Ismail Danesh

Unclear

- Ghulam Dastagir Panjsheri (believed to be in Kar)
- Abdul Zahoor Razmjo
