= Mahmud Suma =

Minister of Higher Education of Afghanistan

Professor Mahmud Suma (Note: Also known as Mahmoud Suma, Mahmoud Soma or Mahmud Soma.), ‘محمود سوما’ in Pashto (January 20, 1931 – December 16, 2015), was Minister of Higher Education of Afghanistan from April 30, 1978 until March 31, 1979 in Nur Muhammad Taraki’s cabinet and from March 31, 1979 until December 27, 1979 in Hafizullah Amin’s cabinet. He previously worked as a professor at the Kabul University from 1966 to 1988.

== Early life and education ==
Mahmud Suma was born on January 20, 1931, into a family of farmers in Matun, Khost, amidst King Mohammad Nadir Shah’s reign. He received his early education at the Ghargash School in Khost, continued his secondary education at the Kabul Teacher’s College and later went to the American University of Beirut for his higher education in chemistry and educational sciences. He returned to Afghanistan as a chemistry teacher and started teaching at Kabul University.

== Political career ==
After the Saur Revolution of 1978, he was given the role of Minister of Higher Education. In 1974 he was awarded with a medal for his national efforts in education.

Suma was part of the Khalq faction of the People’s Democratic Party of Afghanistan, which led to him being incarcerated for ten years and three months by the pro-Soviet Parcham regime in the Pul-e-Charkhi prison. After the Soviet withdrawal from Afghanistan in 1989, Dr. Mohammad Najibullah issued amnesties to political prisoners, including to Suma. He was offered a job at the government but refused and soon returned to teaching at the University of Kabul again until the start of the collapse of the communist government in 1992.

Following the collapse, he moved to Pakistan and stayed in Peshawar for three years. Then he moved to Russia and emigrated to the Netherlands three months later, seeking political asylum, which he successfully got. He passed away on December 16, 2015 in Vienna, Austria.

== Book works ==
Suma has written chemistry textbooks for grades 7 to 12 for Afghan schools. He has also written about 10 political books, such as The Armed Uprising of Saur and The Issue of Afghanistan.
