= Tahir Badakhshi =

Afghan politician (1933–1979)

Taher Badakhshi طاهر بدخشی
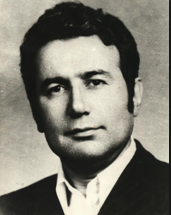
- Born: October 30, 1933; Badakhshan, Afghanistan
- Died: October 30, 1979 (aged 46); Kabul Afghanistan
- Occupations: Studies of economics at Kabul University. Journalist, author, cultural and political personality
- Political party: Revolutionary Organization of the Toilers of Afghanistan سازمان انقلابی زحمتکشان افغانستان

Taher Badakhshi (October 30, 1933 – October 30, 1979) (Dari: طاهر بدخشی) was a cultural and political personality in Afghanistan. He had performed a large variety of cultural and political activities in Afghanistan including organisation of different scale gatherings of authors, journalists and writers of the country and hosting meetings in which the intelligentsia of different cultural and political backgrounds came together for discussions, and he was the founder of سازمان انقلابی زحمتکشان افغانستان (transl. Revolutionary Organization of the Toilers of Afghanistan), a progressive and liberal leftist group with affinity to the Non-Aligned Movement that was founded in Yugoslavia in 1956, triggered by Josip Broz Tito, and promoted by the two most pivotal personalities in the global South: Jawaharlal Nehru and Gamal Abdel Nasser. This has been the exact opposite to the other leftist parties with a high affinity to USSR and China. The group has also had a firm touch to the liberal principles and heterogeneous ideas of liberalism and modernism, and of course in the very temporal and geographic context of the country, it had affinities to the leftist liberation and anti-colonial movements in Asia, Latin America and Africa.

== Biography ==
Taher Badakhshi was born in Fayzabad, Badakhshan. He completed his primary studies in the province Badakhshan, and then moved to Kabul for continuing his higher education, he completed high school at Habibia School at 1957. He entered the University of Kabul and studied economics and law. He completed his studies on economics at 1961 and started to work. He had worked in the research department of the University until 1967. Afterward he began to work in ministries: He went to the department (ministry) of education, where he was working till his detention by the regime at 1978. During all these years of political activities he was imprisoned many times: 1964 by the King Zahir Shah's regime because of organizing and leading a massive manifestation of student, scholars and regular folks in Kabul. In 1969 he was arrested because of subversive political activities by the same system. In 1975 by the President Daud's regime, a highly conservative ruler supposed by the leftist, because of political resistance, and finally in 1978 by the leftist regime of Muhammad Taraki.

In 1978 he was arrested by the secret service of the Muhammad Taraki government. He was kept in solitary confinement at Pole-charkhi prison and had to undergo massive torture by the secret service of the regime and, finally was murdered in prison by Hafizullah Amin in 1979. The scale of killings and torture for thousands of citizens was neglected by the global media at that time and ignored widely by regional governments and by Soviet Union and USA. The killings by the regime of Amin was the focus of war crimes investigation led by Dutch police and prosecutors, the result was a death list that was published by the Dutch prosecutor's office on 17 September 2013, finally you could read names.

His spouse Mrs Jamila Badakhshi and their children Walid Arsalan, Rudaba Nilab, Jawid Mazyar and Harun Rozbeh moved in 1985 to Germany and still live there.

== Activities ==
During these times he was very close to a Kabul-based literature scene under the influence of Sufi poets Ghulam Dehqan and Khalilullah Khalili. He began contacting a broad circle of urban intellectuals with activities in the field of culture and politics. He was connected in long lasting friendship to the avant-garde intellectuals like the university professor, poet, linguist Wasef Bakhtari and the novelist and historian Azam Rahnaward Zariab, who were the primary sources of the contemporary poetics and fiction of Persian literature in Afghanistan. He was actively involved and proactive in literary and intellectual circles of Kabul. Badakhshi additionally spent his reserve period in the Royal Afghan Army in the Harbi Military University, distributing magazines and publications from the Tudeh Party of Iran among the institution's students.

He was a co-ordinator of the first congress of People's Democratic Party of Afghanistan, the first main leftist democratic party in Afghanistan. He left the party in 1967 after the membership of Hafizullah Amin who had a suspected prehistory of ethno-centric chauvinist activities in the south of the country and recently returned from the United States. He arranged a circle named "Mahfele Entezar" (Waiting circle) movement and later the "Revolutionary Organisation of Workers of Afghanistan" or SAZA Political movement, speaking out for the basic political rights for all citizens and for improvement of economic and educational conditions of the people.

== Ideas ==
There has been little systematic and systemic research on core ideas and thoughts of Taher Badakhshi in recent years. The lack of serious academic studies on his legacy is remarkable. This epistemic void might be caused by different factors. Rarely you will find any university in the Western hemisphere performing systematic research on modernism in Afghanistan with the specific focus on the liberal, ideas of liberalism, the heterogeneous leftist movements there and, on the contextualization of the relevant events since 1945 till end of the century.

This obvious research gap of academic institutions in the Western hemisphere seems to be the real world insight of the protagonist and experts, especially when it comes to the pivotal and formative years between 1955 and 1975. On has to express the amazement why Western academia has been neglecting the real world dynamics of the intellectual history of the liberal, ideas of liberalism, the heterogeneous leftist movements in Afghanistan.

The "Taher Badakhshi Institute" پژوهش کده طاهر بدخشی exactly to cover up a significant epistemic gap in research on of the liberal, ideas of liberalism, the heterogeneous leftist movements in Afghanistan. The institute has gathered a significant body of evidence, including the political memories of Taher Badakhshi and most significant writings and will consecutively publish them in order to create a new field of research on a specific version of modernisms in Afghanistan. The research, so the scholars of the institute, will be designed, "to measure the real world outcome on four levels. First level will contain relevant general statements and targeted and specific information on the notion of modernism. A version of modernism in a national geographic framework that is called Afghanistan and on a historic spotlight that encompasses South & West as well Central Asia (according to the UNESCO). Second level will contain a body of ideas, ideologies and policies in AFG between 1945 and 2017 that had been related to the liberal and liberalism with all their implications and variations. Not the superficial term of a "liberal" group or organization is meant here, but ideas based on the notion of principle justice, political emancipation and freedom as such and in AFG. Ideologies backing liberal connotations and struggles and, ultimately, those policies leading to a certain degree of statehood/nationhood, justice and freedom. A certain degree means any fine and discrete difference had been made by these ideas, ideologies and policies. Third level will contain the notion of the left/leftist movements that are, of course, the peak of any liberal understanding and liberalism aiming and desiring principle justice, political emancipation and freedom as such and in Afghanistan. Fourth level will be explicitly concentrated on ideas, communications and actions of Taher Badakhshi. Why Taher Badakhshi, because there is today, under the current circumstances in Afghanistan, and because of the peculiar conditions there, an urgent need to do so, to recapitulate and to revise his ideas, communications and actions from the 1960s until his violent disappearance in 1979."

== Politics ==
The main political background was built by third world freedom movements like in Vietnam, Palestine, or African anti-colonial fights and it was orientated on Non-Aligned Movement. The political activities between 1965 and 1978 were mainly focussed on basic reformative goals toward a liberal (republican and democratic) system in which basic human rights of all inhabitants of the country, independent of their ethnic or economic background, would be respected. A special regard was concentrated on the obvious and objective antagonism of ethnic disparity and inequality in favour of Pashtuns and, in evident disfavor of other ethnic groups as they are Uzbeks, Hazaras and to some extent even Tajiks. Activities were directed against the Pashtun ethnic-dominance and elitism in relevant fields of politics, finance, military, police; asking for equal rights of all other ethnicities in Afghanistan. The political organization he led has been called the "Revolutionary Organization of the Toilers of Afghanistan" سازمان انقلابی زحمتکشان افغانستان. It was labeled misleadingly as Setami Milli (National Oppression) by right wing extremists of the royal family and, at the same time, by the "leftist" functionaries, mainly by Pashtun activists of the "People's Democratic Party of Afghanistan". He came because of his opposition to the system into political detention many times in his life, for days, weeks or multiple months: during the times of King Zahir Shah, during the first republic of Muhammad Daoud. In the meantime, he worked in the Ministry of Education, where he kept working during the regime of Nur Muhammad Taraki after the leftist coup d état in April 1978 too. His cultural work and productivity in terms of writing multiple newspapers, journals and magazines on poetry, prose, philosophy and theology had been documented well, but mostly got lost in the years of the war that came after 1980. The theoretical work done by Taher Badakhshi in the meantime extended from poetry and prose to solid concepts of political thinking and action that are yet in urgent need to be studied. Experts in area studies from the Global North (or the Western hemisphere) are at the beginning of research.

== Legacy ==
His political and theoretical legacy in the years to come experienced heterogeneous transformation, often by good will or by theoretical misunderstandings, it remains still a current issue in the politics and concepts of politics in Afghanistan.

The "Taher Badakhshi Institute", a Berlin-based research organization, has been conducting thorough academic research on Taher Badakhshi's ideas and works as well as activities. The work has been published in the "Journal of Taher Badakhshi Institute" by TBI Academic Press. The memorials for his legacy take place each year in the country by local and regional personalities and outside of the country by diaspora intelligentsia. The last large-scale event in 2017 took place in Canada and Afghanistan.
