= Politburo =

Executive committee of a communist party

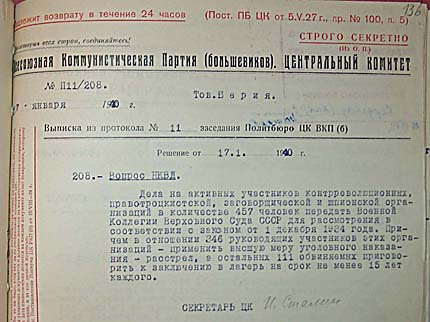
The Soviet Politburo passes a resolution to execute 346 "enemies of the CPSU and the Soviet Government" who led "counter-revolutionary, pro-Trotskyist, plotting and spying activities", signed by secretary Stalin, 17 January 1940.

A politburo (/ˈpɒlɪtbjʊəroʊ/) (Russian: политбюро, romanized: politbyuro, IPA: [pəlʲɪdbʲʉˈro]) or political bureau is the highest organ of the central committee in communist parties. The term is also sometimes used to refer to similar organs in socialist and Islamist parties, such as the Political Bureau of Hamas. Politburos are part of the governing structure in most former and existing communist states.

== Names ==
The term politburo in English comes from the Russian politbyuro (политбюро), itself an abbreviation of politicheskoye byuro (политическое бюро 'political bureau'). The Spanish term Politburó is directly loaned from Russian, as is the German Politbüro. Chinese uses a calque (Chinese: 政治局; pinyin: Zhèngzhìjú), from which the Vietnamese (Bộ Chính trị 部政治), and Korean (정치국, 政治局, Jeongchiguk) terms derive.

== History ==
=== Origin and the Soviet Union ===
The concept of a politburo was created during the Russian Revolution. On 23 October 1917, the Bolshevik Party Central Committee established a political bureau to manage the operational direction of the armed insurrection in Petrograd. It initially had seven members: Vladimir Lenin, Grigory Zinoviev, Lev Kamenev, Leon Trotsky, Joseph Stalin, Grigori Sokolnikov, and Andrei Bubnov. However, this initial body was short-lived, ceasing operations shortly after the success of the Petrograd coup and the overthrow of the Russian Provisional Government.

In March 1919, during the 8th Congress of the Bolsheviks, the party formally established a permanent Politburo tasked with making rapid decisions that could not wait for full sessions of the larger Central Committee. The initial membership comprised five full members: Vladimir Lenin, Leon Trotsky, Joseph Stalin, Lev Kamenev, and Nikolay Krestinsky.

After Lenin's death in 1924, authority within the Politburo became contested during the rise of Stalin. Stalin used his position as General Secretary to systematically eliminate dissenting members, making it subordinate under his personal rule. In 1952, at the 19th Party Congress, the Politburo was renamed the Presidium of the Central Committee and expanded, though real executive power remained concentrated in a smaller inner leadership.

After Stalin's death in 1953, collective leadership was restored within the Presidium. The body reclaimed the name Politburo in 1966 during the 23rd Party Congress under Leonid Brezhnev. The Soviet Politburo continued as the supreme governing authority until political reforms under Mikhail Gorbachev restructured state authority, culminating in the dissolution of the Soviet Union in 1991.

During the 20th century, politburos were established in most Communist states. They included the politburos of the USSR, East Germany, Afghanistan, and Czechoslovakia. Today, there are five countries that have a politburo system: China, North Korea, Laos, Vietnam, and Cuba.

=== Chinese Communist Party ===
The Chinese Communist Party adopted the organizational framework of the Soviet Politburo following its establishment. The Politburo of the Chinese Communist Party was established in May 1927 at the 5th National Congress.

To consolidate control, the party created an inner core within the Politburo known as the Politburo Standing Committee. The Politburo Standing Committee functions as the highest decision-making authority in China, overseeing party administration, state organs, and armed forces.

=== Spread to other states and non-communist entities ===
Following World War II, states within the Eastern Bloc and allied socialist regimes across Asia, Africa, and Latin America instituted politburos that took after the Soviet model. Notable examples include the Politburo of the Socialist Unity Party of Germany, the Politburo of the Communist Party of Vietnam, and the Politburo of the Communist Party of Cuba.

=== Marxist–Leninist states ===
In Marxist–Leninist states, the communist party is the vanguard of the people, therefore the legitimate body to lead the state. The party selects officials to serve in its politburo, which decides party policy. As a one-party state, party policy invariably becomes national policy.

Each Party Congress elects a Central Committee which, in turn, elects the members of the politburo, secretariat, and a general secretary. This process is termed democratic centralism.

Beyond Marxist-Leninist governance, several non-communist political organizations adopted the politburo structure or title for their executive committees. These include nationalist movements, socialist parties, and regional political bodies such as the Hamas political bureau or the Ba'ath Party executive committee.

=== Trotskyist parties ===
In Trotskyist parties, the Politburo is a bureau of the Central Committee tasked with making day-to-day political decisions, which must later be ratified by the Central Committee. Its members are chosen by the Central Committee, who appoints it. The post of General Secretary carries far less weight in this model.

== Structure and decision-making ==
=== Democratic centralism ===
Governance within politburos follows the principle of democratic centralism, an organizational and decision-making doctrine established by Vladimir Lenin. Under this system, policy options are debated internally among members until a decision is reached. Once a resolution is adopted, all members are bound to support it publicly and enforce party directives without publicly dissenting.

=== Membership and tiers ===
Membership within a politburo generally consists of two distinct tiers:

- Full members (also known as voting members): Hold full voting rights on policy, legislative proposals, and leadership.
- Candidate members (also known as alternate or non-voting members): Attend sessions and participate in discussions, providing expertise and administrative guidance, but lack voting power on final decisions.

Members are elected by the Central Committee during party congresses. In practice, existing leadership controls the nomination process, maintaining self-perpetuating executive authority.

=== Interplay with state and party organs ===
While the Central Committee is the designated supreme party body between congresses, its large size and infrequent meetings complicate governance. The Politburo acts as the continuous supreme decision-making council.

The Secretariat functions alongside the Politburo, managing daily operational implementation and overseeing executive appointments. Key leaders, such as the General Secretary, frequently hold dual membership in both bodies to align decision-making with administrative execution.

== See also ==
- Eastern Bloc politics
- Executive committee
- Orgburo
- Politburo of the Communist Party of the Soviet Union
- Politburo of the Chinese Communist Party
- Politburo of the Communist Party of Cuba
- Politburo of the Communist Party of Vietnam
- Politburo of the Communist Party of India (Marxist)
- Politburo of the Lao People's Revolutionary Party
- Politburo of the Party of Labour of Albania
- Politburo of the People's Democratic Party of Afghanistan
- Politburo of the Polish United Workers' Party
- Politburo of the Workers' Party of Korea
- Political Bureau of the Central Committee of FRELIMO
- Politburo of the Zimbabwe African National Union – Patriotic Front
- Presidium
