= Nawa, Afghanistan =

Nawa ناوه
- Location in Afghanistan
- Coordinates: 32°19′17″N 67°53′13″E
- Country: Afghanistan
- Province: Ghazni
- District: Nawa
- Elevation: 2,007 m (6,585 ft)
- Time zone: UTC+4:30

Nawa (Pashto: ناوه) is located on 32.3215°N 67.887°E at 2,007 m altitude in the central part of Nawa District, Afghanistan. The town is located within the heartland of the Tarakai tribe of the Ghilji Pashtuns.

== Climate ==
Nawa has a humid continental climate (Köppen: Dsa) with hot summers and cold winters.

Climate data for Nawa, Ghazni Province
| Month | Jan | Feb | Mar | Apr | May | Jun | Jul | Aug | Sep | Oct | Nov | Dec | Year |
|---|---|---|---|---|---|---|---|---|---|---|---|---|---|
| Daily mean °C (°F) | −5.3 (22.5) | −1.5 (29.3) | 6.2 (43.2) | 11.8 (53.2) | 17.0 (62.6) | 22.8 (73.0) | 25.1 (77.2) | 23.5 (74.3) | 19.7 (67.5) | 12.8 (55.0) | 6.4 (43.5) | 0.3 (32.5) | 11.6 (52.8) |
| Average precipitation mm (inches) | 52.9 (2.08) | 73.7 (2.90) | 76.5 (3.01) | 51.8 (2.04) | 25.6 (1.01) | 9.9 (0.39) | 22.9 (0.90) | 33.4 (1.31) | 12.0 (0.47) | 6.1 (0.24) | 20.9 (0.82) | 9.7 (0.38) | 395.4 (15.55) |
| Average relative humidity (%) | 51 | 56 | 42 | 31 | 21 | 19 | 29 | 29 | 20 | 22 | 36 | 38 | 33 |
Source 1: ClimateCharts
Source 2: World Weather Online (Precipitation & Humidity)

== Notable people ==
- Nur Muhammad Taraki (President of Afghanistan from 1978 to 1979);
- Enaiatollah Akbari, the protagonist of the book "In the sea there are crocodiles" by Fabio Geda, which tells of the journey of an Afghan child (Enaiat) who escapes from slavery and travels through the Middle East until eventually arriving in Italy, where he lives.

== See also ==
- Ghazni Province
