= Karte Char =

Coordinates: 34°51′N 69°14′E

Karte Char کارته چهار
- Neighborhood of Kabul
- Country: Afghanistan
- Province: Kabul

Karte Char (Dari: کارته چهار), literally Fourth Quarter, is a neighborhood in western Kabul, Afghanistan, part of District 3. It is located by the Sevom Aqrab Road that goes to Kote Sangi, and is located very close to Kabul University, Kabul Zoo, the Gardens of Babur and the Darulaman Road. It is a planned and urbanized locality but it suffered greatly during the 1990s civil war and was one of the city's worst-hit. Karte Seh is located south across the Chamcheh Mast river crossed by Pul-e Surkh (the Red Bridge).

== Notable residents ==
- Nur Muhammad Taraki until 1979
