= Abdul Karim Misaq =

Afghan politician

- عبدالکریم میثاق

Minister of Finance
- In office 1978–1979

Mayor of Kabul
- In office 1989–1990

Personal details
- Born: 1937 Ghazni province, Kingdom of Afghanistan
- Died: 2016 (aged 78–79) London, United Kingdom
- Party: People's Democratic Party of Afghanistan
- Occupation: Writer, Political
- Ethnicity: Afghan Hazara

Abdul Karim Misaq (DariHazaragi: عبدالکریم میثاق) was a writer, politician, and former Minister of Finance of Afghanistan.

He was born in 1937 in Ghazni province, Afghanistan, into an ethnic Hazara Dai Folad family. After graduating in 1965, he joined the People's Democratic Party of Afghanistan and later became a member of the party's bureau. He served as Afghanistan's Minister of Finance during the reigns of Nur Muhammad Taraki and Hafizullah Amin from 1978 to 1979. He was first appointed to the position after the Saur Revolution in May 1978.

Misaq served as the mayor of Kabul for one year in 1989, then took refuge in London in 1990. He authored around 20 books covering fiction, poetry, history and politics.

Abdul Karim Misaq died on Saturday, April 16, 2016 in London at the age of 80 due to Parkinson's disease.
