= Nur Ahmed Nur =

Afghan politician (1937–2024)

Nur Ahmed Nur نور احمد نور
- Nur in 1978

Minister of the Interior
- In office 30 April 1978 – 1978
- Prime Minister: Nur Muhammad Taraki
- Preceded by: Abdul Qadir Nuristani

9th Ambassador of Afghanistan to the United States
- In office 1980–1981
- President: Babrak Karmal
- Preceded by: Abdul Waheed Karim
- Succeeded by: Mohed Salem Spartak

Personal details
- Born: 1937 Panjwayi, Kandahar, Kandahar Province, Kingdom of Afghanistan
- Died: 4 January 2024 (aged 86–87) Netherlands
- Party: People's Democratic Party of Afghanistan

Nur Ahmed Nur (Dari: نور احمد نور; 1937 – 4 January 2024) was an Afghan politician, belonging to the Parcham faction.

Nur was born in 1937 in Kandahar. He graduated from Kabul University in 1961. He was one of four candidates of the People's Democratic Party of Afghanistan who were elected to the Afghan parliament in 1965. After the overthrow of the Daoud government in April 1978, Nur became Minister for Internal Affairs. In July the same year, Nur was removed from his office and sent to Washington as the new Afghan ambassador to the United States.

Nur was a politburo member of the PDPA and the Secretary of the Central Committee of the party. He died on 4 January 2024, at the age of 87.

Political offices
Preceded by Abdul Nuristani	Minister of the Interior; 1978	Succeeded by Unknown
