= Ghulam Dastagir Panjsheri =

Afghan communist politician and public servant

- غلام دستگير پنجشیری
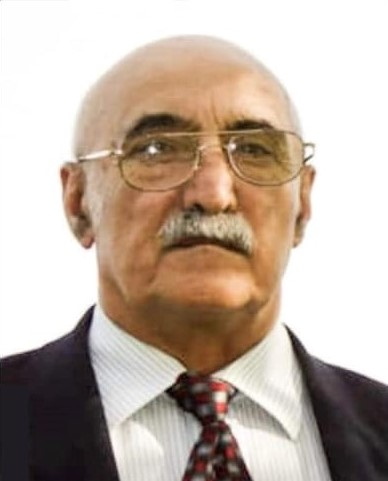

Minister of Education
- In office 30 April 1978 – 1978
- Prime Minister: Nur Mohammad Taraki
- Preceded by: Ibrahim Majid Siraj

Minister of Public Works
- In office August 1978 – August 1979
- President: Nur Mohammad Taraki; Hafizullah Amin

Personal details
- Born: 1933 Panjshir, Kingdom of Afghanistan
- Died: 26 December 2022 (aged 89) Seattle, Washington, U.S.
- Party: PDPA-Khalq

Ghulam Dastagir Panjsheri (1933 – 26 December 2022) was an Afghan communist politician and public servant. Panjsheri was usually identified as a Khalq by fellow Afghan politicians, while outside observers said he was creating his own PDPA group under the name Gruhi Kar.

== Early career ==
Panjsheri studied at Kabul Teachers College and was the faculty of letters at the Kabul University. After working in a journal under the name, Anis and teaching literature at the Kabul Teachers College he started working for the Ministry of Information and Culture. In 1965, he became a member of the Central Committee of the PDPA at their first congress meeting on January 1, 1965. When Babrak Karmal left the PDPA because of the power struggle between the Khalq and the Parchams, Panjsheri left the party with Karmal and the rest of his supporters, he eventually returned to his original position in the PDPA and became a member of the Khalqi faction again. Later on, he tried to establish his own splinter communist party, which turned out to be unsuccessful. Between 1969 and 1972 he was imprisoned for political activities.

It is unknown what position he held or what he did under the rule of Mohammad Daoud Khan's Daoud's Republic of Afghanistan (1973–1978).

== Democratic Republic of Afghanistan ==
After the People's Democratic Party of Afghanistan (PDPA) sized power after the Saur Revolution (1978), he was Minister of Education and later Minister of Public Works under Nur Mohammad Taraki. He held the job as Minister of Public Works until Hafizullah Amin rose to power in 1979 after his assassination of Taraki. Under the rule of Babrak Karmal he was promoted to the Central Committee's Politburo. While seen by many as a Khalqi, he was given the position of Chairman of the Party Control Commission.

According to rumours at that time Panjsheri was establishing his own political group within the PDPA with help from the Soviet government in Moscow. The name of his political group was Kar.

He died on 26 December 2022, at the age of 89.
