= Nawa District =

Nawa District ناوه
- District
- Nawa
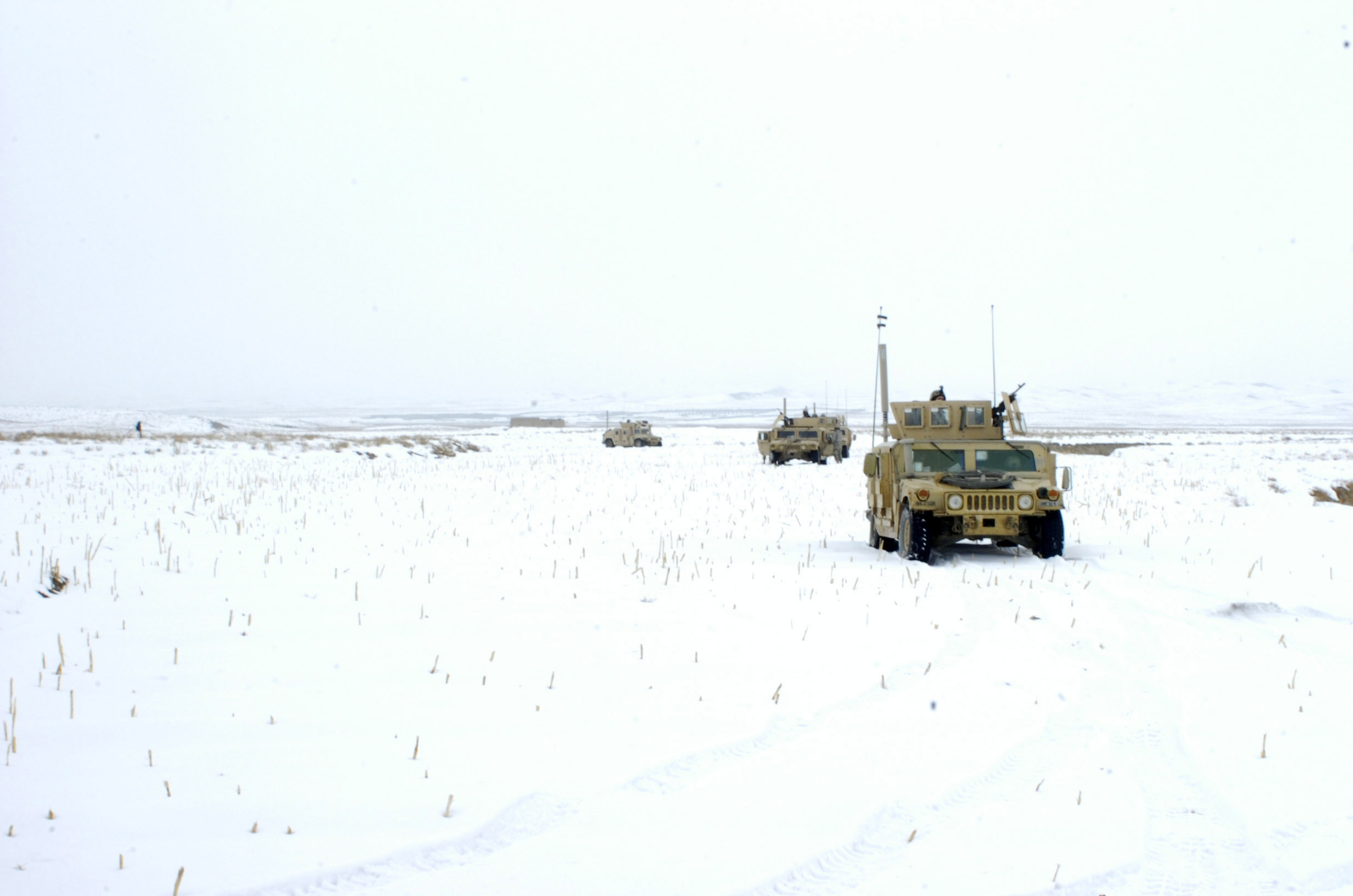

- Location within Afghanistan
- Coordinates: 32°19′25″N 67°52′38″E
- Country: Afghanistan
- Province: Ghazni Province
- Occupation: Taliban
- Elevation: 1,950 m (6,400 ft)

Population (2022)
  - Total: 281,000

Nawa (Pashto: ناوه) is a large district in the far south of Ghazni Province, Afghanistan. It is 100 km south from Ghazni in a mountainous region. The salt lake Ab-i Istada is located in the northern part of the district. Nawa's population was estimated at 29,054 in 2002, of whom around 45% were children under 12. The district center is the village of Nawa. Military operations in the district were featured in articles in the Washington Post and the New York Times in October 2009. The district was controlled by the Taliban until 17 July 2017.

The district is within the heartland of the Tarakai tribe of Khilji Pashtuns.

== Geography ==
Nawa District borders Gelan on the North, Dila and Wazakhan of Paktika on the east, Nawbahar (Zabul) on the west and Shumolzai (Zabul) on the south.

== Economy and agriculture ==
Most of the population live in villages in mud-built homes. Agriculture has been seriously affected by drought. The main sources of water are shallow wells. Trade and animal husbandry are sources of income. There is a shortage of clinics and schools, as well as the professionals to work in them.

== Notable people ==
- Nur Muhammad Taraki (President of Afghanistan from 1978 to 1979)

== See also ==
- Districts of Afghanistan
- Ghazni Province
