= Guruh-i Kar =

Afghan Communist political faction

The Kar or Guruh-i Kar (Dari: گروه کار, "Worker's Group") was a faction of the communist PDPA party in Afghanistan. At one point, Kar was one of four PDPA factions, along with the Parcham, Khalqi, and Setam-e Milli. The group was headed by Dastagir Panjsheri, who later joined the Khalq.

In 1987, President Najibullah approved a plan to form four militia units from the ranks of the Gruhi Kar, to secure the group's home area of Jowzjan and Faryab Provinces. However Abdul Rashid Dostum, an Uzbek leader then serving as a DRA Army officer, intervened to block the creation of the Kar militias and ordered the arrest of Kar members (resulting in the death of one).
