= Nahua (disambiguation) =

The Nahua are an indigenous people of Mexico and Central America.

Nahua may also refer to:

- Nahuatl, the language of the Nahuas
- Nahuan languages, a subgroup of the Uto-Aztecan languages, including Nahuatl
- Nahua, or Yaminawa language, a language of Peru
