= Pul-e-Charkhi prison =

Maximum-security prison located in Kabul, Afghanistan

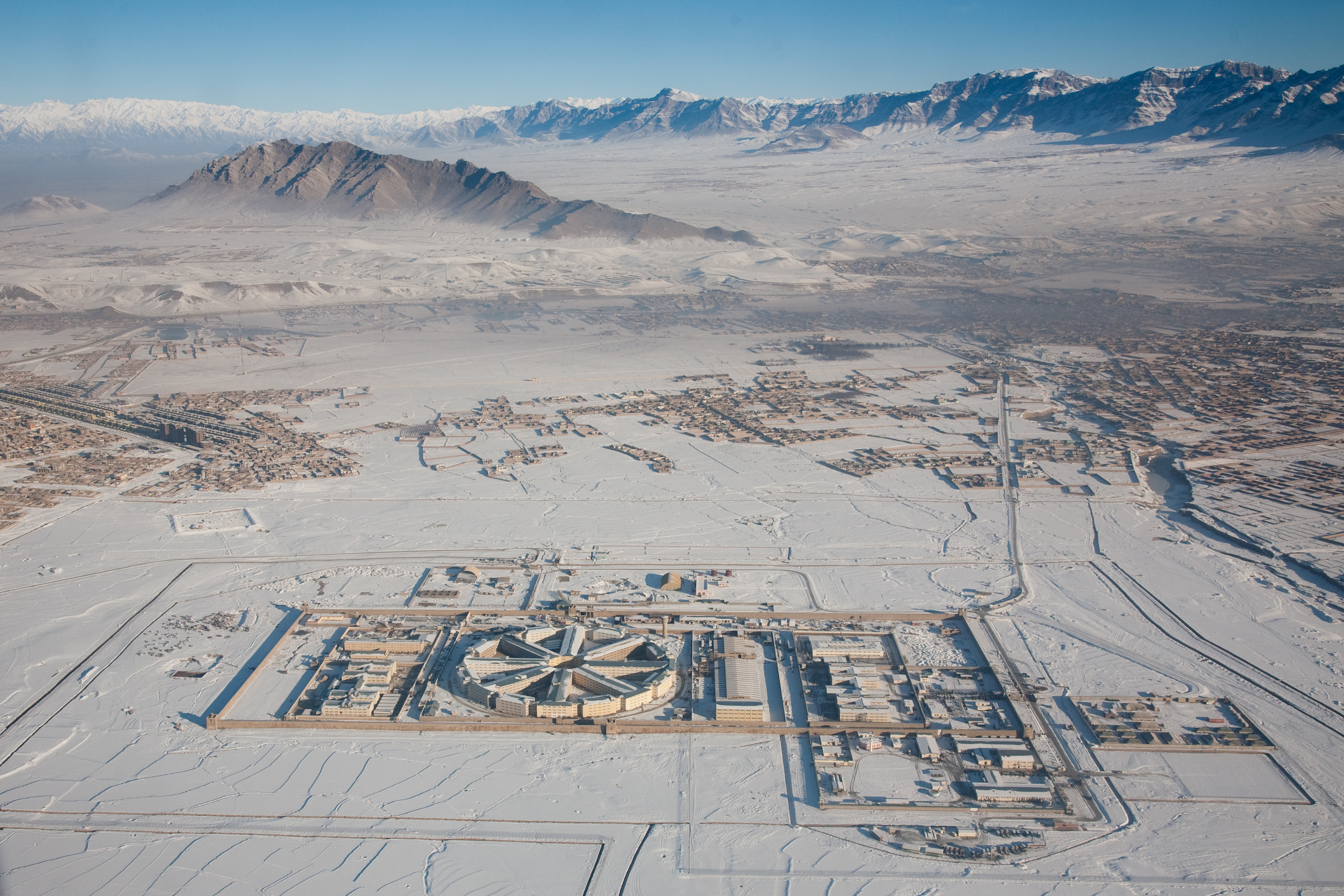
- Aerial view of the Pul-e Charkhi prison complex, January 2012
- Interactive map of Pul-e-Charkhi prison
- Location: Kabul; 34.5196°N 69.3476°E
- Status: Operational
- Security class: Medium
- Capacity: 14,000
- Opened: 1980s
- Managed by: Directorate of Prisons Affairs

Pul-e-Charkhi prison (Note: Pashto: د پلچرخي زندان Dari: زندان پل چرخی) also known as the Afghan National Detention Facility (Note: Pashto: د افغانانو د توقیف ملي مرکز Dari: بازداشتگاه ملی افغان ها), is a medium-security prison located next to the Ahmad Shah Baba Mina neighborhood in the eastern part of Kabul, Afghanistan. It has the capacity to house a maximum of 14,000 inmates, but as of October 2024 it only has around 5,000 inmates, most of whom are males and have been convicted within the jurisdiction of Kabul and nearby provinces. It is considered the country's largest prison.

== History ==
Construction of Pul-e-Charkhi prison began in the 1970s by order of former president Mohammed Daoud Khan and was completed during the 1980s. It became notorious for torture and executions after the 1978 Saur Revolution as well as during the ten-year Soviet-Afghan War that followed. Some claim that between April 1978 and December 1979, the communist People's Democratic Party of Afghanistan (PDPA) under Nur Muhammad Taraki, executed around 27,000 political prisoners at Pul-e-Charkhi. In 1978, a few days after the Saur Revolution, Nur Muhammad Taraki's government remanded mullahs who called for a jihad against the PDPA to Pul-e-Charkhi. In January 1980, Babrak Karmal's regime released around 2,000 inmates as the result of a political promise prior to coming into power. Locals were angry that around 100 inmates weren't released, resulting in a large prison protest turned riot with thousands of attendees, ultimately resulting in a prison break that released some of the remaining 100 inmates.

=== Executions ===
Pul-e-Charkhi has been the country's main execution facility. Notable executions include that of juvenile terrorist Zar Ajam and another man who were executed in June 2011 for a terrorist attack against New Kabul Bank in Jalalabad in February of that year.

=== Mass grave ===
In December 2006, members of the International Security Assistance Force discovered a communist-era mass grave close to the Pul-e-Charkhi prison. It is believed that the grave held some 2,000 bodies. The Afghan Ministry of Information and Culture believed that the massacre took place between 1978 and 1986 when the Moscow-backed communist presidents Nur Muhammad Taraki, Hafizullah Amin and Babrak Karmal were in power.

=== Living conditions ===
In 2008, the living conditions of inmates at the prison have been criticized by several human rights groups. There had been eight cell blocks but only three were being used which has caused overcrowding. There are also about 400 female inmates who are housed in a special female section of the prison.

=== Riots and escapes ===
In December 2004, foreign prisoners attacked guards with razor blades. A subsequent shoot-out left one Iraqi and three Pakistani prisoners and four Afghan police dead.

In January 2006, seven prisoners escaped by mingling with visitors. A month later, a riot was sparked by a new prison policy forcing prisoners to wear bright orange clothing, a rule enacted to avoid events similar to the January escape. The February 2006 riot resulted in six deaths and 22 injured, according to the International Committee of the Red Cross. The rioters used makeshift weapons to attack guards, then ignited furniture on fire, and smashed doors and windows. They eventually took over a wing of the prison and held it for a few days. The riot finally ended on the first of March.

On 16 March 2008, after a two-week dispute over arrests following an attempted jail-break, inmates rioted and took over sections of the building. Gunfire was heard in the complex and inmates claimed to be holding hostage two members of the Afghan National Army (ANA). The hostage-takers threatened to kill the ANA members unless mediators were sent in to resolve the conflict.

=== Renovation and expansion ===
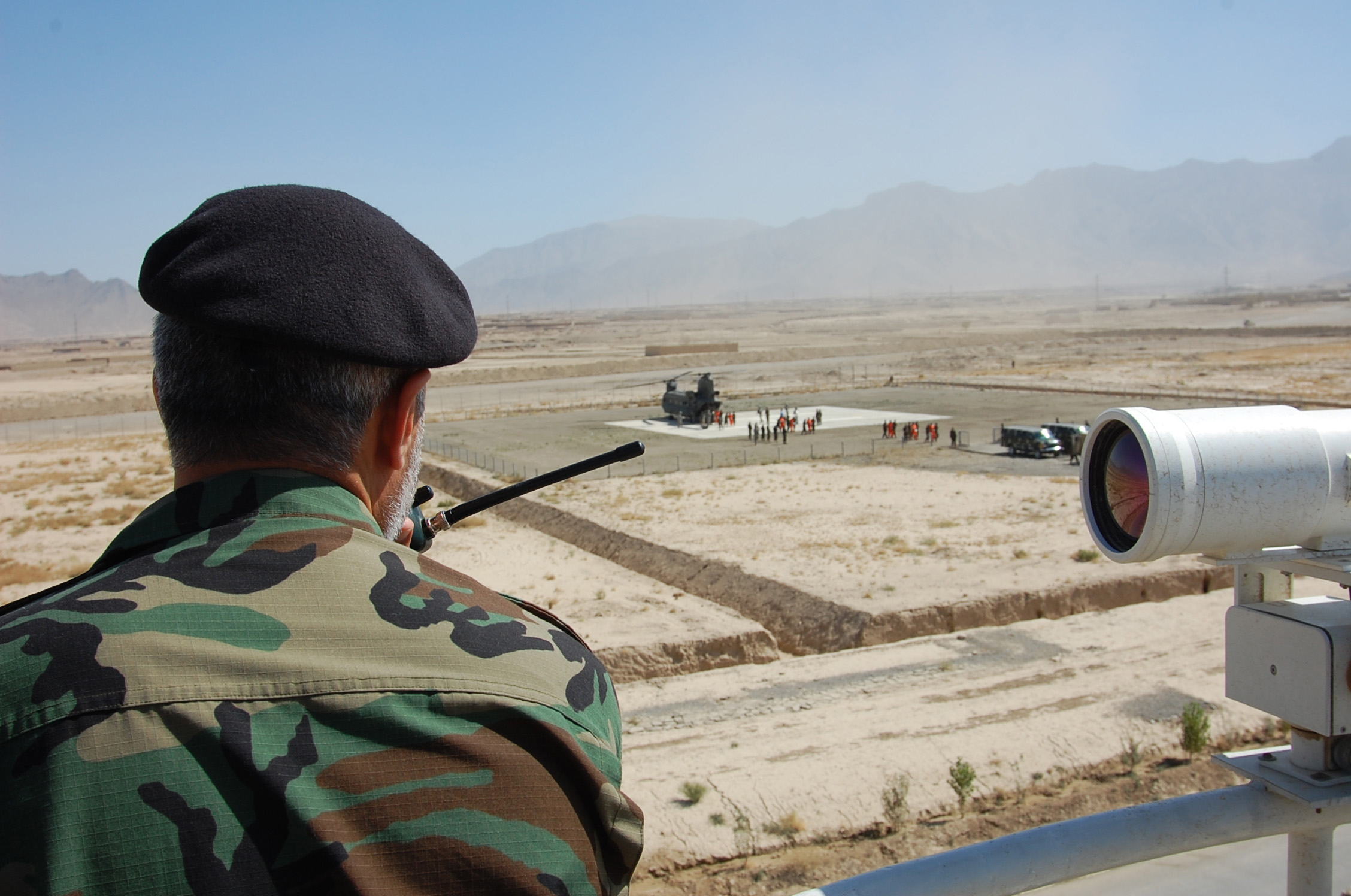
Prisoners being transferred from the Parwan Detention Facility at Bagram to Pul-e-Charkhi prison in 2008

The prison has been renovated in recent years with assistance from the United States, including the United States Army Corps of Engineers. In 2007, the U.S. military began transferring some of its detainees from Bagram Air Base in Afghanistan to the Pul-e-Charkhi prison. By January 2008, as many as 125 detainees from the Parwan Detention Facility and 32 detainees from the U.S. Guantanamo Bay detention camp had been transferred to Pul-e-Charkhi. This was followed by the transfer of some 250 more detainees.

The United States repeatedly announced that it will be shutting down its Guantanamo Bay detention camps, in Cuba. The Americans planned to transfer most of the captives held in extrajudicial detention in Guantanamo, and in its less well known Parwan Detention Facility to Afghan custody.

The initial plan called for reducing the maximum number of men held per cell from the current eight, to just two. For security reasons every cell would be equipped with its own toilet, replacing the current insecure method of letting all the captives leave their cells and share a single toilet at the end of each cell block.

Under this initial plan, the modernization of this wing cost $20 million, and would have a maximum capacity of 670 captives. However, after a tour of the facility, during its modernization, it was realized that, for cultural reasons, captives could not be expected to share a toilet with another man. Afghan cultural modesty would not allow a captive to use a toilet with another man present, cutting the capacity of the modernized facility in half.

On May 6, 2007, two American soldiers, Colonel James W. Harrison Jr. and Master Sergeant Wilberto Sabalu, part of the oversight team, were shot dead by one of the Afghan guards. This forced a delay on construction as all the guards underwent new security checks. Finally, there was controversy within the Afghan government as to which ministry would be responsible for the modernized part of the prison.

By January 2008, 32 captives from the Guantanamo Bay detention camp and 125 captives from the Parwan Detention Facility had been transferred to Pul-e-Charkhi. The Center for Constitutional Rights reported that all of the Afghans repatriated to Afghanistan from April 2007 were sent to the Pul-e-Charkhi prison.

In February 2009, a team from the United Kingdom's Channel 4 toured the American wing of the prison. By September 2009 the United States had transferred some 250 former detainees from its Guantanamo Bay detention camp to Pul-e-Charkhi, often to the shock of their waiting families, according to Human Rights First.

=== 2021 ===
On August 15, 2021, management of the prison was taken over by forces of the Taliban after the fall of President Ashraf Ghani's government. The Taliban released all of the inmates from the jail, including many of their fellow members. According to prison officials, all inmates are well-fed and provided free healthcare. In addition, they are allowed to study, work, engage in recreational activities, and make daily phone calls to family or friends.

== See also ==
- List of prisons in Afghanistan
