= Hafizullah Amin =

Afghan communist politician (1929–1979)

Comrade Hafizullah Amin
- حفيظ الله امين
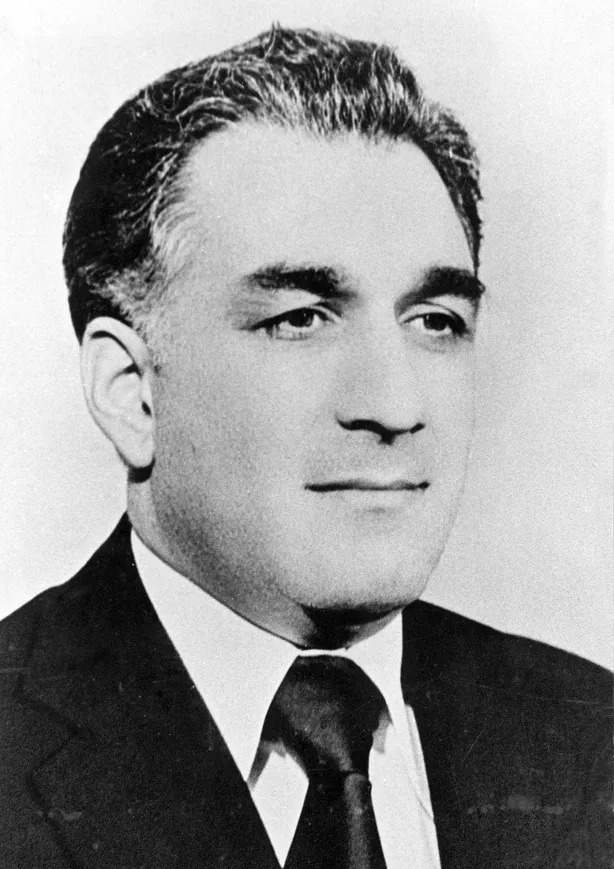
- Amin in 1979

General Secretary of the People's Democratic Party of Afghanistan
- In office 14 September 1979 – 27 December 1979
- Preceded by: Nur Muhammad Taraki
- Succeeded by: Babrak Karmal

Minister of National Defence
- In office 28 July 1979 – 27 December 1979
- Prime Minister: Nur Muhammad Taraki; Himself
- Preceded by: Mohammad Aslam Watanjar
- Succeeded by: Mohammed Rafie

Chairman of the Council of Ministers Head of Government
- In office 27 March 1979 – 27 December 1979
- Leader: Nur Muhammad Taraki; Himself
- Preceded by: Nur Muhammad Taraki
- Succeeded by: Babrak Karmal

Minister of Foreign Affairs
- In office 1 May 1978 – 28 July 1979
- Prime Minister: Nur Muhammad Taraki; Himself
- Preceded by: Mohammed Daoud Khan
- Succeeded by: Shah Wali

Chairman of the Revolutionary Council Head of State
- In office 14 September 1979 – 27 December 1979
- Preceded by: Nur Muhammad Taraki
- Succeeded by: Babrak Karmal

Personal details
- Born: 1 August 1929 Paghman, Afghanistan
- Died: 27 December 1979 (aged 50) Tajbeg Palace, Kabul, Afghanistan
- Cause of death: Assassination by Gunshot wound in the head by Soviet Spetsnaz during Operation Storm 333
- Resting place: Tajbeg Palace Grounds
- Party: People's Democratic Party of Afghanistan (Khalq)
- Spouse: Patmanah
- Children: 7
- Education: University of Kabul (BSc); Columbia University (MA)
- Occupation: Politician; Party Functionary; Revolutionary
- Profession: Teacher; Civil Servant

Military service
- Allegiance: Democratic Republic of Afghanistan
- Branch/service: Afghan Army; KAM
- Years of service: 1978–1979
- Battles/wars: Saur Revolution; 1979 uprisings
- Central institution membership: 1965–1979: Member, Central Committee; 1978–1979: Member, Politburo; 1978–1979: Member, Revolutionary Council
- Top Leader: ← Taraki; Karmal →

Hafizullah Amin (Pashto: حفيظ الله امين; 1 August 1929 – 27 December 1979) was an Afghan revolutionary and communist head of state, who served in that position for a little over three months, from September 1979 until his assassination. He organized the Saur Revolution of 1978 and co-founded the Democratic Republic of Afghanistan (DRA), ruling Afghanistan as General Secretary of the People's Democratic Party.

Born in the town of Paghman in Kabul Province, Amin studied at Kabul University and started his career as a teacher before he twice went to the United States to study. During this time, Amin became attracted to Marxism and became involved in radical student movements at the University of Wisconsin. Upon his return to Afghanistan, he used his teaching position to spread socialist ideologies to students, and he later joined the People's Democratic Party of Afghanistan (PDPA), a new far-left organization co-founded by Nur Muhammad Taraki and Babrak Karmal. He ran as a candidate in the 1965 parliamentary election but failed to secure a seat, but in 1969 became the only Khalqist elected to parliament, increasing his standing within the party.

Amin was the main organizer of the April 1978 Saur Revolution, which overthrew the government of Mohammad Daoud Khan and formed a pro-Soviet state based on socialist ideals. Being second in chief of the Democratic Republic, Amin soon became the regime's strongman, the main architect of the state's programs including mass persecution of those deemed counter-revolutionary. A growing personal struggle with General Secretary Taraki eventually led to Amin wrestling power away then successfully deposing him and later ordering his execution; on 16 September 1979, Amin named himself Chairman of the Council of Ministers (head of government), Chairman of the Revolutionary Council (head of state), and General Secretary of the PDPA Central Committee (supreme leader).

Amin's short-lived leadership featured controversies from beginning to end. His government failed to solve the problem of the population revolting against the regime as the situation rapidly worsened and army desertions and defections continued. He tried to change things with friendly overtures to the United States, although his reputation in Washington was severely tarnished by his role in the assassination of U.S. Ambassador to Afghanistan Adolph Dubs. Many Afghans, especially those from rural areas, held Amin responsible for the regime's harshest measures, such as ordering thousands of executions. Thousands of people disappeared without a trace during his time in office. The Soviet Union under Leonid Brezhnev was dissatisfied with and mistrusted Amin after he conducted a series of purges against the Parcham; they intervened in Afghanistan, invoking the 1978 Twenty-Year Treaty of Friendship between Afghanistan and the Soviet Union. Soviet operatives assassinated Amin at the Tajbeg Palace on 27 December 1979 as part of Operation Storm-333, kickstarting the decade-long Soviet–Afghan War.

== Early life and career ==
Hafizullah Amin was born to a Kharoti Ghilzai Pashtun family in the Qazi Khel village in Paghman on 1 August 1929. His father, a civil servant, died in 1937 when he was 8. Thanks to his brother Abdullah, a primary school teacher, Amin was able to attend both primary and secondary school, which in turn allowed him to attend Kabul University (KU). After studying mathematics there, he also graduated from the Darul Mualimeen Teachers College in Kabul, and became a teacher. Amin later became vice-principal of the Darul Mualimeen College, and then principal of the prestigious Avesina High School.

In 1957, Amin left Afghanistan for Columbia University in New York City, where he earned MA in education. It was at Columbia that Amin became attracted to Marxism, and in 1958 he became a member of the university's Socialist Progressive Club. When he returned to Afghanistan, Amin became a teacher at Kabul University, and later, for the second time, the principal of Avesina High School. During this period Amin became acquainted with Nur Muhammad Taraki, a communist. Around this time, Amin quit his position as principal of Avesina High School to become principal of the Darul Mualimeen College.

It is alleged that Amin became radicalised during his second stay in the United States in 1962, when he enrolled in a work-study group at the University of Wisconsin. Amin studied in the doctoral programme at the Teachers College of Columbia University, but started to neglect his studies in favor of politics and in 1963 he became head of the Afghan students' association at the college. The association was funded by the Asia Foundation, known to be a CIA pass-through group, or front. When he returned to Afghanistan in the mid-1960s, he supposedly flew first to Moscow where he met the Afghan ambassador to the Soviet Union, his old friend Ali Ahmad Popel, a previous Afghan Minister of Education. During his short stay, Amin became even more radicalised. According to others, Nabi Misdaq for instance, Amin did not return by way of Moscow, but rather West Germany and Lebanon.

By the time he had returned to Afghanistan, the Communist People's Democratic Party of Afghanistan (PDPA) had already held its founding congress, which was in 1965. Amin ran as a candidate for the PDPA in the 1965 parliamentary election, and lost by a margin of fewer than fifty votes. In 1966, when the PDPA Central Committee was expanded, Amin was elected as a non-voting member, and in the spring of 1967 he gained full membership. Amin's standing in the Khalq faction of the PDPA increased when he was the only Khalqist elected to parliament in the 1969 parliamentary election.

When the PDPA split along factional lines in 1967, between Khalqists led by Nur and Parchamites led by Babrak Karmal, Amin joined the Khalqists. As a member of parliament, Amin tried to win over support from the Pashtun people in the armed forces. According to a biography about Amin, he used his position as member of parliament to fight against imperialism, feudalism, and reactionary tendencies, and fought against the "rotten" regime, the monarchy. Amin himself said that he used his membership in parliament to pursue the class struggle against the bourgeoisie. Relations between Khalqists and Parchamites deteriorated during this period. Amin, the only Khalq member of parliament, and Babrak Karmal, the only Parcham member of parliament, did not cooperate with each other. Amin would later, during his short stint in power, mention these events with bitterness. Following the arrest of fellow PDPA members Dastagir Panjsheri and Saleh Mohammad Zeary in 1969, Amin became one of the party's leading members, and was still a pre-eminent party member by the time of their release in 1973.

== The Daoud era ==
From 1973 until the PDPA unification in 1977, Amin was second only to Taraki in the Khalqist PDPA. When the PDPA ruled Afghanistan, their relationship was referred to as a disciple (Amin) following his mentor (Taraki). This official portrayal of the situation was perhaps misleading, their relationship having more to do with pragmatic calculations. Taraki needed Amin's "tactical and strategic talents" and, while Amin's motivations are more uncertain, it is commonly believed that he associated with Taraki to protect his own position. Amin had attracted many enemies during his career, the most notable being Karmal. According to the official version of events, Taraki protected Amin from party members or others who wanted to damage the PDPA and the country.

When Mohammad Daoud Khan ousted the monarchy in 1973, and established the Republic of Afghanistan, the Khalqist PDPA offered its support for the new regime if it established a National Front which presumably included the Khalqist PDPA itself. The Parchamite PDPA had already established an alliance with Daoud at the beginning of his regime, and Karmal called for the dissolution of the Khalqist PDPA. Karmal's call for dissolution only worsened relations between the Khalqist and Parchamite PDPA. Fortunately for Taraki and Amin, Karmal's alliance actually hurt the Parchamites' standing in Afghan politics. Some communists in the armed forces, disillusioned with the government of Daoud, turned to the Khalqist PDPA because of its apparent independence. Parchamite association with the Daoud government indirectly led to the Khalqist-led PDPA coup of 1978, popularly referred to as the Saur Revolution.

From 1973 until the 1978 coup, Amin was responsible for organising party work in the Afghan armed forces. According to the official version, Amin "met patriotic liaison officers day or night, in the desert or the mountains, in the fields or the forests, enlightening them on the basis of the principles of the working class ideology." Amin's success in recruiting military officers lay in the fact that Daoud "betrayed the left" soon after taking power. When Amin began recruiting military officers for the PDPA, it was not difficult for him to find disgruntled military officers.

In the meantime, relations between the Parchamite and Khalqist PDPA deteriorated, In 1973 it was rumoured that Major Zia Mohammadzai, a Parchamite and head of the Republican Guard, planned to assassinate the entire Khalqist leadership. The alleged plot failed because the Khalqists found out about it. The assassination attempt proved to be a further blow to relations between the Parchamites and Khalqists. The Parchamites deny that they ever planned to assassinate the Khalqist leadership, but historian Beverley Male argues that Karmal's subsequent activities give credence to the Khalqist view of events. Because of the Parchamite assassination attempt, Amin pressed the Khalqist PDPA to seize power in 1976 by ousting Daoud. The majority of the PDPA leadership voted against such a move. The following year, in 1977, the Parchamites and Khalqists officially reconciled. The Parchamite and Khalqist PDPAs, which had separate general secretaries, politburos, central committees and other organisational structures, were officially unified in the summer of 1977. One reason for unification was that the international communist movement, represented by the Communist Party of India, Iraqi Communist Party and the Communist Party of Australia, called for party unification.

== Saur Revolution ==
On 18 April 1978 Mir Akbar Khyber, the chief ideologue of the Parcham faction, was killed, presumably by the Daoud government. Khyber's assassination initiated a chain of events which led to the PDPA taking power eleven days later, on 27 April. The assassin was never caught, but Anahita Ratebzad, a Parchamite, believed that Amin had ordered the assassination.

Khyber's funeral evolved into a large anti-government demonstration. Daoud, who did not understand the significance of the events, began a mass arrest of PDPA members seven days after Khyber's funeral. Amin, who organised the subsequent revolution against Daoud, was one of the last Central Committee members to be arrested by the authorities. His late arrest can be considered as proof of the regime's lack of information since Amin was the leading revolutionary party organiser. The government's lack of awareness was proven by the arrest of Taraki as it was the pre-arranged signal for the revolution to commence. When Amin found out that Taraki had been arrested, he ordered the revolution to begin at 9 am on 27 April. Amin, in contrast to Taraki, was not imprisoned, but instead put under house arrest. His son, Abdur Rahman, was still allowed freedom of movement. The revolution was successful thanks to overwhelming support from the Afghan military, including the Defence Minister, Ghulam Haidar Rasuli; the commander of the Afghan Army, Aslam Watanjar; and the Chief of Staff of the Afghan Air Force, Abdul Qadir. Daoud, his family, and high ranking loyalists were executed.

== PDPA rule ==
=== Khalq–Parcham break ===
After the Saur revolution, Taraki was appointed Chairman of the Presidium of the Revolutionary Council and Chairman of the Council of Ministers, and retained his post as PDPA general secretary. Taraki initially formed a government which consisted of both Khalqists and Parchamites. Karmal became Deputy Chairman of the Revolutionary Council, while Amin became Minister of Foreign Affairs and a Deputy Prime Minister, and Mohammad Aslam Watanjar became a Deputy Prime Minister. The two Parchamites Abdul Qadir and Mohammad Rafi became Minister of National Defence and Minister of Public Works respectively. According to Angel Rasanayagam, the appointment of Amin, Karmal and Watanjar as Deputy Prime Ministers led to the establishment of three cabinets; the Khalqists were answerable to Amin, the Parchamites were answerable to Karmal, and the military officers (who were Parchamites) were answerable to Watanjar.

The first conflict between the Khalqists and Parchamites arose when the Khalqists wanted to give PDPA Central Committee membership to the military officers who participated in the Saur Revolution. Amin, who had previously opposed the appointment of military officers to the PDPA leadership, switched sides, supporting their elevation. The PDPA Politburo voted in favor of giving membership to the military officers. The victorious Khalqists portrayed the Parchamites as opportunists who had ridden the revolutionary wave without actually participating in the revolution. To make matters worse for the Parchamites, the term Parcham was, according to Taraki, a word synonymous with factionalism.

There is only one leading force in the country – Hafizullah Amin. In the Politburo, everybody fears Amin.

— PDPA Politburo member Nur Ahmad Nur telling Soviet Ambassador Alexander Puzanov, June 1978

On 27 June 1978, three months after the revolution, Amin managed to outmaneuver the Parchamites at a Central Committee meeting. The meeting decided that the Khalqists had exclusive rights to formulate and decide policy, a policy which left the Parchamites impotent. Karmal was exiled, but was able to establish a network with the remaining Parchamites in government. A coup to overthrow Amin was planned for September. Its leading members in Afghanistan were Qadir, the defence minister, and Army Chief of Staff General Shahpur Ahmedzai. The coup was planned for 4 September, the day of the festival of Eid, because soldiers and officers would be off duty. The conspiracy failed when the Afghan ambassador to India told the Afghan leadership about the plan. A purge was initiated, and Parchamite ambassadors were recalled; few returned, for example Karmal and Mohammad Najibullah both preferred to stay in their assigned countries.

=== Amin–Taraki break ===
The Afghan people revolted against the PDPA government when the government introduced several socialist reforms, including land reforms. By early 1979, 25 out of Afghanistan's 28 provinces were unsafe because of armed resistance against the government. On 29 March 1979, the Herat uprising began; the uprising turned the revolt into an open war between the Afghan government and anti-regime resistance. It was during this period that Amin became Kabul's strongman. Shortly after the Herat uprising had been crushed, the Revolutionary Council convened to ratify the new Five-Year Plan, the Afghan–Soviet Friendship Treaty, and to vote on whether or not to reorganise the cabinet and to enhance the power of the executive (the Chairman of the Revolutionary Council). While the official version of events said that all issues were voted on democratically at the meeting, the Revolutionary Council held another meeting the following day to ratify the new Five-Year Plan and to discuss the reorganisation of the cabinet.

As one of our slogans is 'to everyone according to his capacity and work', therefore as a result of past performances and services he has won our greater trust and assurances. I have full confidence in him and in the light of this confidence I entrust him with this job...

— Taraki telling his colleagues why Amin should be appointed Prime Minister.

Alexander Puzanov, the Soviet ambassador to Afghanistan, was able to persuade Watanjar, Sayed Mohammad Gulabzoy and Interior Minister Sherjan Mazdoryar to become part of a conspiracy against Amin. These three men put pressure on Taraki, who by this time believed that "he really was the 'great leader'", to sack Amin from office. It is unknown if Amin knew anything about the conspiracy against him, but it was after the cabinet reorganisation that he talked about his dissatisfaction. On 26 March, the PDPA Politburo and the Council of Ministers approved the extension of the powers of the executive branch, and the establishment of the Homeland Higher Defence Council (HHDC) to handle security matters.

Many analysts of the day regarded Amin's appointment as Prime Minister as an increase in his powers at the expense of Taraki. However, the reorganisation of the cabinet and the strengthening of Taraki's position as Chairman of the Revolutionary Council, had reduced the authority of the Prime Minister. The Prime Minister was, due to the strengthening of the executive, now appointed by the Chairman of the Revolutionary Council. While Amin could appoint and dismiss new ministers, he needed Taraki's consent to actually do so. Another problem for Amin was that while the Council of Ministers was responsible to the Revolutionary Council and its chairman, individual ministers were only responsible to Taraki. When Amin became Prime Minister, he was responsible for planning, finance and budgetary matters, the conduct of foreign policy, and for order and security. The order and security responsibilities had been taken over by the HHDC, which was chaired by Taraki. While Amin was HHDC Deputy chairman, the majority of HHDC members were members of the anti-Amin faction. For instance, the HHDC membership included Watanjar the Minister of National Defence, Interior Minister Mazdoryar, the President of the Political Affairs of the Armed Forces Mohammad Iqbal, the Chief of the General Staff Mohammad Yaqub, the Commander of the Afghan Air Force Nazar Mohammad, and Assadullah Sarwari, the head of ASGA, the Afghan secret police.

Amin cabinet (1979)
Office	Incumbent	Took office	Left office
Deputy Chairman of the Council of Ministers	Shah Wali	1 April	27 December
Minister of Foreign Affairs	Shah Wali	1 April	27 December
Minister of Agriculture	Saleh Muhammad Zarei	1 April	28 July
Minister of Agriculture	Abdul Rashid Jalili	28 July	27 December
Minister of Finance	Abdul Karim Misaq	1 April	27 December
Minister of Higher Education	Mahmud Suma	1 April	27 December
Minister of National Defence	Muhammad Aslam Watanjar	1 April	28 July
Minister of National Defence	Hafizullah Amin	28 July	27 December
Minister of Education	Abdul Rashid Jalili	1 April	28 July
Minister of Education	Muhammad Salim Masudi	28 July	27 December
Minister of Justice, Attorney General	Abdul Hakim Shara'i	1 April	27 December
Minister of Water, Power	Mahmud Hashemi	1 April	27 December
Minister of Information, Culture	Khial Katawazi	1 April	27 December
Minister of Mines, Industries	Muhammad Isma'il Danesh	1 April	27 December
Minister of Commerce	Abdul Quddus Ghorbandi	1 April	27 December
Minister of Transport	Hasan Bareq-Shafi'i	1 April	27 December
Minister of Border Affairs	Sahibjan Sahra'i	1 April	28 July
Minister of Border Affairs	Sherjan Mazdoryar	28 July	14 September
Minister of Border Affairs	Unknown		
Minister of Post, Telegraph and Telephone	Sayed Mohammad Gulabzoy	28 July	14 September
Minister of Post, Telegraph and Telephone	Mohammad Zarif	14 September	27 December
Minister of Interior	Muhammad Aslam Watanjar	28 July	14 September
Minister of Interior	Faqir Mohammad Faqir	14 September	27 December
Minister of Planning	Muhammad Siddig Alemyar	28 July	27 December
Minister of Health	Saleh Muhammad Zirai	28 July	27 December
Minister of Public Works	Dastagir Panjsheri	28 July	27 December

The order of precedence had been institutionalised, whereby Taraki was responsible for defence and Amin responsible for assisting Taraki in defence related matters. Amin's position was given a further blow by the democratisation of the decision-making process, which allowed its members to contribute; most of them were against Amin. Another problem for Amin was that the office of HHDC Deputy chairman had no specific functions or powers, and the appointment of a new defence minister who opposed him drastically weakened his control over the Ministry of National Defence. The reorganisation of ministers was a further blow to Amin's position; he had lost control of the defence ministry, the interior ministry and the ASGA. Amin still had allies at the top, many of them in strategically important positions, for instance, Yaqub was his brother-in-law and the Security Chief in the Ministry of Interior was Sayed Daoud Taroon, who was also later appointed to the HHDC as an ordinary member in April. Amin succeeded in appointing two more of his allies to important positions; Mohammad Sediq Alemyar as Minister of Planning and Khayal Mohammad Katawazi as Minister of Information and Culture; and Faqir Mohammad Faqir was appointed Deputy Prime Minister in April 1978.

Amin's political position was not secure when Alexei Yepishev, the Head of the Main Political Directorate of the Soviet Army and Navy, visited Kabul. Yepishev met personally with Taraki on 7 April, but never met with Amin. The Soviets were becoming increasingly worried about Amin's control over the Afghan military. Even so, during Yepishev's visit Amin's position was actually strengthened; Taroon was appointed Taraki's aide-de-camp.

Our homeland's enemies, the enemies of the working class movement all over the world are trying to penetrate into the PDPA leadership and above all woo the working class party leader but the people of Afghanistan and the PDPA both take great pride in the fact that the PDPA and its General-Secretary enjoys a great personality which render him impossible to woo.

— Amin in a speech in which he warns of inter-party sectarianism.

Soon after, at two cabinet meetings, the strengthening of the executive powers of the Chairman of the Revolutionary Council was proven. Even though Amin was Prime Minister, Taraki chaired the meetings instead of him. Amin's presence at these two meetings was not mentioned at all, and it was made clear that Taraki, through his office as Chairman of the Revolutionary Council, also chaired the Council of Ministers. Another problem facing Amin was Taraki's policy of autocracy; he tried to deprive the PDPA Politburo of its powers as a party and state decision-making organ. The situation deteriorated when Amin personally warned Taraki that "the prestige and popularity of leaders among the people has no common aspect with a personality cult."

Factionalism within the PDPA made it ill-prepared to handle the intensified counter-revolutionary activities in the country. Amin tried to win support for the communist government by depicting himself as a devout Muslim. Taraki and Amin blamed different countries for helping the counter-revolutionaries; Amin attacked the United Kingdom and the British Broadcasting Corporation (BBC) and played down American and Chinese involvement, while Taraki blamed American imperialism and Iran and Pakistan for supporting the uprising. Amin's criticism of the United Kingdom and the BBC fed on the traditional anti-British sentiments held by rural Afghans. In contrast to Taraki, "Amin bent over backwards to avoid making hostile reference to", the People's Republic of China, the United States, or other foreign governments. Amin's cautious behavior was in deep contrast to the Soviet Union's official stance on the situation; it seemed that the Soviet leadership tried to force a confrontation between Afghanistan and its enemies. Amin also tried to appease the Shia communities by meeting with their leaders; despite this, a section of the Shia leadership called for the continuation of the resistance. Subsequently, a revolt broke out in a Shia populated district in Kabul; this was the first sign of unrest in Kabul since the Saur Revolution. To add to the government's problems, Taraki's ability to lead the country was questioned – he was a heavy drinker and was not in good health. Amin on the other hand was characterised in this period by portrayals of strong self-discipline. In the summer of 1979 Amin began to disassociate himself from Taraki. On 27 June, Amin became a member of the PDPA Politburo, the leading decision-making body in Afghanistan.

=== Rise to power ===
In-mid July, the Soviets made their view official when Pravda wrote an article about the situation in Afghanistan; the Soviets did not wish to see Amin become leader of Afghanistan. This triggered a political crisis in Afghanistan, as Amin initiated a policy of extreme repression, which became one of the main reasons for the Soviet intervention later that year. On 28 July, a vote in the PDPA Politburo approved Amin's proposal of creating a collective leadership with collective decision-making; this was a blow to Taraki, and many of his supporters were replaced by pro-Amin PDPA members. Ivan Pavlovsky, the Commander of the Soviet Ground Forces, visited Kabul in mid-August to study the situation in Afghanistan. Amin, in a speech just a few days after Pavlovsky's arrival, said that he wanted closer relations between Afghanistan and the People's Republic of China; in the same speech he hinted that he had reservations about Soviet meddling in Afghanistan. He likened Soviet assistance to Afghanistan with Vladimir Lenin's assistance to the Hungarian Soviet Republic in 1919. Taraki, a delegate to the conference held by the Non-Aligned Movement in Havana, met personally with Andrei Gromyko, the Soviet Minister of Foreign Affairs, to discuss the Afghanistan situation on 9 September. Shah Wali, the Afghan Minister of Foreign Affairs, who was a supporter of Amin, did not participate in the meeting. This, according to Beverley Male, "suggested that some plot against Amin was in preparation".

Taraki was instructed to stop-over in Moscow, where the Soviet leaders urged him to remove Amin from power as per the Soviet KGB's decision, because Amin posed danger. Amin's trusted aid, Taroon, informed Amin of the meeting and the KGB's plan. In Kabul, Taraki's aides, the "Gang of Four" (consisting of Watanjar, Mazdoryar, Gulabzoi and Sarwari), planned to assassinate Amin but failed as Amin was informed of their plot. Within hours of Taraki's return to Kabul on 11 September, Taraki convened the cabinet "ostensibly to report on the Havana Summit". Instead of reporting on the summit, Taraki tried to dismiss Amin as Prime Minister. Amin, aware of the murder plot, demanded the Gang of Four to be removed from their posts, but Taraki laughed it off. Taraki sought to neutralise Amin's power and influence by requesting that he serve overseas as an ambassador. Amin turned down the proposal, shouting "You are the one who should quit! Because of drink and old age you have taken leave of your senses."

On 13 September, Taraki invited Amin to the presidential palace for lunch with him and the Gang of Four. Amin turned down the offer, stating he would prefer their resignation rather than lunching with them. Soviet ambassador Puzanov persuaded Amin to make the visit to the Presidential Palace along with Taroon, the Chief of Police, and Nawab Ali, an intelligence officer. Inside the palace on 14 September, bodyguards within the building opened fire on the visitors. Taroon was killed but Amin only sustained an injury and escaped. Amin drove to the Ministry of Defence building, put the Army on high alert and ordered Taraki's arrest. At 6:30 pm tanks from the 4th Armoured Corps entered the city and stood at government buildings. Shortly afterwards, Amin returned to the palace with a contingent of Army officers, and placed Taraki under arrest. The Gang of Four, however, had "disappeared" and sought refuge in the Soviet Embassy.

After Taraki's arrest, the Soviets tried to rescue Taraki (or, according to other sources, kidnap Amin) via the embassy or Bagram Air Base but the strength of Amin's officers repelled their decision to make a move. Amin was told by the Soviets not to punish Taraki and strip him and his comrades of their positions, but Amin ignored them. Amin reportedly discussed the incident with Leonid Brezhnev, and indirectly asked for the permission to kill Taraki, to which Brezhnev replied that it was his choice. Amin, who now believed he had the full support of the Soviets, ordered the death of Taraki. It is believed Taraki was suffocated with pillows on 8 October 1979. The Afghan media would report that the ailing Taraki had died, omitting any mention of his murder. Taraki's murder shocked and upset Brezhnev.

== Leadership ==
=== Domestic policies ===
Following Taraki's fall from power, Amin was elected Chairman of the Presidum of the Revolutionary Council and General Secretary of the PDPA Central Committee by the PDPA Politburo. The election of Amin as PDPA General Secretary and the removal of Taraki from all party posts was unanimous. The only members of the cabinet replaced when Amin took power were the Gang of Four – Beverley Male saw this as "a clear indication that he had their [the ministers'] support."

Amin's rise to power was followed by a policy of moderation, and attempts to persuade the Afghan people that the regime was not anti-Islamic. Amin's rise to power was officially endorsed by the Jamiatul Ulama on 20 September 1979. Their endorsement led to the official announcement that Amin was a pious Muslim – Amin thus scored a point against the counter-revolutionary propaganda which claimed the communist regime was atheist. Amin's government began to invest in the reconstruction, or reparation, of mosques. He also promised the Afghan people freedom of religion. Religious groups were given copies of the Quran, and Amin began to refer to Allah in speeches. He even claimed that the Saur Revolution was "totally based on the principles of Islam." The campaign proved to be unsuccessful, and many Afghans held Amin responsible for the regime's totalitarian behavior.

Amin also tried to increase his popularity with tribal groups, a feat Taraki had been unable or unwilling to achieve. In a speech to tribal elders Amin was defensive about the Western way he dressed; an official biography was published which depicted Amin in traditional Pashtun clothes. During his short stay in power, Amin became committed to establishing a collective leadership; when Taraki was ousted, Amin promised "from now on there will be no one-man government..."

We will not leave a backward country for future generations

— Amin, as quoted in the New Kabul Times, September 30, 1979

Attempting to pacify the population, Amin released a list of 18,000 people who had been executed, and blamed the executions on Taraki. Nevertheless, opposition to the communist regime increased, and the government lost control of the countryside. The state of the Afghan Armed Forces deteriorated; due to desertions the number of military personnel in the Afghan army decreased from 100,000 in the immediate aftermath of the Saur Revolution, to somewhere between 50,000 and 70,000.

Another problem Amin faced was the KGB's penetration of the PDPA, the military and the government bureaucracy. While Amin's position in Afghanistan was becoming more perilous by the day, his enemies who were exiled in the Soviet Union and the Eastern Bloc were agitating for his removal. Babrak Karmal, the Parchamite leader, met several leading Eastern Bloc figures during this period, and Watanjar, Gulabzoy and Sarwari wanted to exact revenge upon Amin.

==== Foreign policy ====
In July 1979, Amin announced that the Democratic Republic of Afghanistan was not bound by old treaties with Iran regarding the distribution of water from the Helmand River. Iran interpreted this as Afghanistan using Soviet backing to assert themselves in the region. When Amin became leader, he tried to reduce Afghanistan's dependence on the Soviet Union. The Soviets were concerned when they received reports that Amin had met personally with Gulbuddin Hekmatyar, one of the leading anti-communists in Afghanistan.

His general untrustworthiness and his unpopularity amongst Afghans made it more difficult for Amin to find new "foreign patrons". Amin's involvement in the death of Adolph Dubs, the American Ambassador to Afghanistan, strained his relations with the United States. He tried to improve relations by reestablishing contact, met with three different American chargé d'affaires, and was interviewed by an American correspondent. But this did not improve Afghanistan's standing in the eyes of the United States Government. After the third meeting with Amin, J. Bruce Amstutz, the American Ambassador to Afghanistan from 1979 to 1980, believed the wisest thing to do was to maintain "a low profile, trying to avoid issues, and waiting to see what happens."

In early December 1979, the Ministry of Foreign Affairs proposed a joint summit meeting between Amin and Muhammad Zia-ul-Haq, the President of Pakistan. The Pakistani Government, accepting a modified version of the offer, agreed to send Agha Shahi, the Pakistani foreign minister, to Kabul for talks. In the meanwhile, the Inter-Services Intelligence (ISI), Pakistani's secret police, continued to train Mujahideen fighters who opposed Amin's regime.

=== Afghan-Soviet relations ===
Any person and any element who harms the friendship between Afghanistan and the Soviet Union will be considered the enemy of the country, enemy of our people and enemy of our revolution. We will not allow anybody in Afghanistan to act against the friendship of Afghanistan and the Soviet Union.

— Amin reassuring the Soviets about his intentions.

Contrary to popular belief, the Soviet leadership headed by Brezhnev, Alexei Kosygin and the Politburo, were not eager to send troops to Afghanistan. The Soviet Politburo decisions were guided by a Special Commission on Afghanistan, which consisted of the KGB chairman Yuri Andropov, Minister of Foreign Affairs Andrei Gromyko, Defence Minister Dmitriy Ustinov, and Boris Ponomarev, the head of the International Department of the Central Committee. The Politburo was opposed to the removal of Taraki and his subsequent murder. According to Brezhnev, the General Secretary of the Central Committee of the Communist Party of the Soviet Union, "Events developed so swiftly in Afghanistan that essentially there was little opportunity to somehow interfere in them. Right now our mission is to determine our further actions, so as to preserve our position in Afghanistan and to secure our influence there." Although Afghan–Soviet relations deteriorated during Amin's short stint in power, he was invited on an official visit to Moscow by Alexander Puzanov, the Soviet Ambassador to Afghanistan, because of the Soviet leadership's satisfaction with his party and state-building policy

Not everything went as planned, and Andropov talked about "the undesirable turn of events" taking place in Afghanistan under Amin's rule. Andropov also brought up the ongoing political shift in Afghanistan under Amin; the Soviets were afraid that Amin would move Afghanistan's foreign policy from a pro-Soviet position to a pro-United States position. By early-to-mid December 1979, the Soviet leadership had established an alliance with Karmal and Sarwari.

Those who boast of friendship with us, they can really be our friend when they respect our independence, our soil and our prideful traditions.

— Amin stressing the importance of Afghan independence.

Amin kept a portrait of Joseph Stalin on his desk. When Soviet officials criticized him for his brutality, Amin replied "Comrade Stalin showed us how to build socialism in a backward country."

As it turned out, the relationship between Puzanov and Amin broke down. Amin started a smear campaign to discredit Puzanov. This in turn led to an assassination attempt against Amin, in which Puzanov participated.

The situation was worsened by the KGB accusing Amin of misrepresenting the Soviet position on Afghanistan in the PDPA Central Committee and the Revolutionary Council. The KGB also noted an increase in anti-Soviet agitation by the government during Amin's rule, and harassment against Soviet citizens increased under Amin. A group of senior politicians reported to the Soviet Central Committee that it was necessary to do "everything possible" to prevent a change in political orientation in Afghanistan. However, the Soviet leadership did not advocate intervention at this time, and instead called for increasing its influence in the Amin leadership to expose his "true intentions". A Soviet Politburo assessment referred to Amin as "a power-hungry leader who is distinguished by brutality and treachery." Amongst the many sins they alleged were his "insincerity and duplicity" when dealing with the Soviet Union, creating fictitious accusations against PDPA-members who opposed him, indulging in a policy of nepotism, and his tendency to conduct a more "balanced policy" towards First World countries. According to the former senior Soviet diplomat, Oleg Grinevsky, the KGB was becoming increasingly convinced that Amin could not be counted on to effectively deal with the insurgency and preserve the survival of the Afghan Marxist state.

By the end of October, the Special Commission on Afghanistan, which consisted of Andropov, Gromyko, Ustinov and Ponomarev, wanted to end the impression that the Soviet government supported Amin's leadership and policy. The KGB's First Chief Directorate was put under orders that something had to be done about Afghanistan, and several of its personnel were assembled to deal with the task. Andropov fought hard for Soviet intervention, saying to Brezhnev that Amin's policies had destroyed the military and the government's capabilities to handle the crisis by use of mass repression. The plan, according to Andropov, was to assemble a small force to intervene and remove Amin from power and replace him with Karmal. The Soviet Union declared its plan to intervene in Afghanistan on 12 December 1979; large numbers of Soviet airborne troops landed in Kabul on 25 December, with the approval of Amin who miscalculated their intentions. Soviet leadership initiated Operation Storm-333 (the first phase of the intervention) on 27 December 1979.

== Death ==
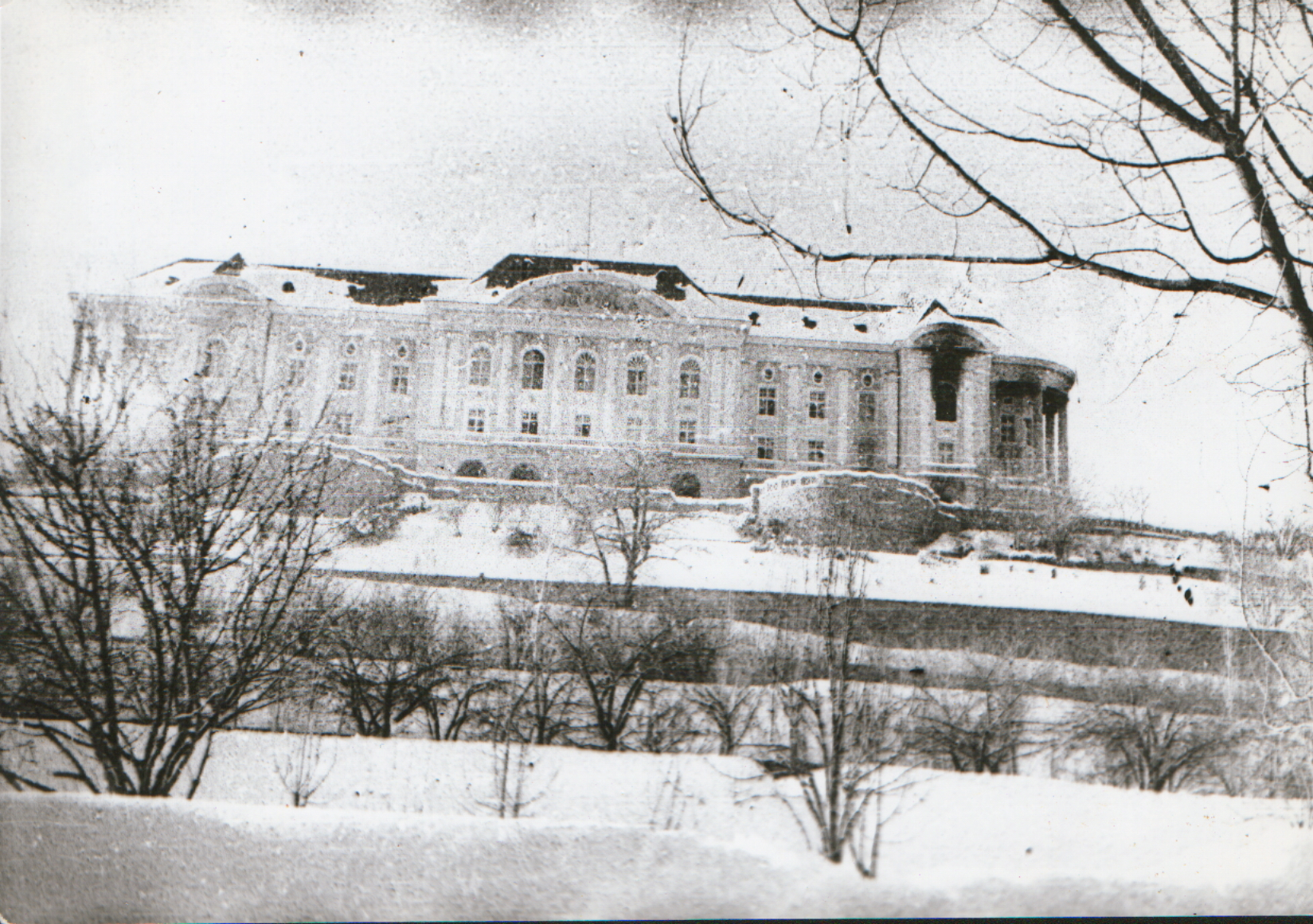
The Tajbeg Palace on 27 December 1979, where Amin was killed

The leadership of the Soviet Union had no need for Amin to remain alive. Andropov's special representative in Afghanistan, General Boris Ivanov, recommended for Amin to attend a conciliatory dinner with his political mentor, who had become an enemy of Amin, so that Amin's chef could poison Amin. However, Amin survived the poisoning after being treated by doctors at the Soviet embassy, who did not know that "special reconnaissance officers" were trying to kill Amin. Since Amin, who was very loyal to the USSR, had survived two attempted assassinations that had been approved by the USSR, the decision was made to eliminate him through a bloody coup at Amin's residence, the Tajbeg Palace.

Amin trusted the Soviet Union until the very end, despite the deterioration of official relations, and was unaware that the tide in Moscow had turned against him since he ordered Taraki's death. When the Afghan intelligence service handed Amin a report that the Soviet Union would invade the country and topple him, Amin claimed that the report was a product of imperialism. His view can be explained by the fact that the Soviet Union, after several months, finally gave in to Amin's demands and sent troops into Afghanistan to secure the PDPA government. Contrary to common Western belief, Amin was informed of the Soviet decision to send troops into Afghanistan. General Tukharinov, commander of the 40th Army, met with Afghan Major General Babadzhan to talk about Soviet troop movements before the Soviet army's intervention. On 25 December, Dmitry Ustinov issued a formal order, stating that "[t]he state frontier of the Democratic Republic of Afghanistan is to be crossed on the ground and in the air by forces of the 40th Army and the Air Force at 1500 hrs on 25 December". This was the formal beginning of the Soviet intervention in Afghanistan.

Concerned for his safety, on 20 December Amin moved from the Presidential Palace, located in the centre of Kabul, to the Tajbeg Palace, which had previously been the headquarters of the Central Corps of the Afghan Army. The palace was formidable, with walls strong enough to withstand artillery fire. According to Rodric Braithwaite, "its defences had been carefully and intelligently organised". All roads to the palace had been mined, with the exception of one, which had heavy machine guns and artillery positioned to defend it. To make matters worse for the Soviets, the Afghans had established a second line of defence which consisted of seven posts, "each manned by four sentries armed with a machine gun, a mortar, and automatic rifles". The external defences of the palace were handled by the Presidential Guard, which consisted of 2,500 troops and three T-54 tanks. Several Soviet commanders involved in the assassination of Amin thought the plan to attack the palace was "crazy". Although the military had been informed by the Soviet leadership through their commanders, Yuri Drozdov and Vasily Kolesnik, that the leader was a "CIA agent" who had betrayed the Saur Revolution, many Soviet soldiers hesitated; despite what their commanders had told them, it seemed implausible that Amin, the leader of the PDPA government, was an American double agent. Despite several objections, the plan to assassinate Amin went ahead.

Before resorting to killing Amin by brute force, the Soviets had tried to poison him as early as 13 December (but nearly killed his nephew instead) and to kill him with a sniper shot on his way to work (this proved impossible as the Afghans had improved their security measures). They even tried to poison Amin just hours before the assault on the Presidential Palace on 27 December. Amin had organised a lunch for party members to show guests his palace and to celebrate Ghulam Dastagir Panjsheri's return from Moscow. Panjsheri's return improved the mood even further; he boasted that he and Gromyko always kept in contact with each other. During the meal, Amin and several of his guests lost consciousness as they had been poisoned. Amin survived his encounter with death, because the carbonation of the Coca-Cola he was drinking diluted the toxic agent. Mikhail Talybov, a KGB agent, was given responsibility for the poisonings.

The assault on the palace began shortly afterward. During the attack Amin still believed the Soviet Union was on his side, and told his adjutant, "The Soviets will help us." The adjutant replied that it was the Soviets who were attacking them; Amin initially replied that this was a lie. Only after he tried but failed to contact the Chief of the General Staff, he muttered, "I guessed it. It's all true." There are various accounts of how Amin died, but the exact details have never been confirmed. Amin was either killed by a deliberate attack or died by a "random burst of fire". Amin's son was fatally wounded and died shortly after. His daughter was wounded, but survived. It was Gulabzoy who had been given orders to kill Amin and Watanjar who later confirmed his death.

== Post-death ==
The men of Amin's family were all executed either immediately or shortly thereafter (his brother Abdullah and nephew Asadullah were executed in June 1980). The women, including his daughter, were imprisoned at Pul-e-Charkhi prison until being released by President Najibullah in early 1992.

After Amin's death on 27 December 1979, Radio Kabul broadcast Babrak Karmal's pre-recorded speech to the Afghan people, saying: "Today the torture machine of Amin has been smashed". Karmal was installed by the Soviets as the new leader, while the Soviet Army began its intervention in Afghanistan that would last for nine years.

On 2 January 1980, on the PDPA's 15th anniversary, Karmal, who was now the new General Secretary, called Amin a "conspirator, professional criminal and recognised spy of the U.S.", as reported in the Kabul New Times. Anahita Ratebzad, the education minister, described Amin as:

...wrathy, cruel and criminal murderer who had made terror and suppression and crushing of every opposition force part and parcel of his way of rule, and started every day with new acts of destruction, putting opponents of his bloody regime, group by group, to places of torture, jails, and slaughterhouses.

In early May 2026, his wife Patmanah Amin died in Germany.

== See also ==
- A special report about the family of Hafizullah Amin -BBC Pashto
- Hafizullah Amin's son Babri Amin answers challenging questions about his father -BBC Pashto
- Assadullah Amin

Party political offices
Preceded by Nur Muhammad Taraki	General Secretary of the People's Democratic Party of Afghanistan; 14 September – 27 December 1979	Succeeded by Babrak Karmal
Political offices
Preceded by Nur Muhammad Taraki	Chairman of the Revolutionary Council; 14 September – 27 December 1979	Succeeded by Babrak Karmal
Preceded by Nur Muhammad Taraki	Chairman of the Council of Ministers; 27 March – 27 December 1979	Succeeded by Babrak Karmal
