= Nur Muhammad Taraki =

Afghan politician (1917–1979)

De Khalq Khidmatkar Nur Muhammad Taraki
- نور محمد ترکی
- Official portrait

General Secretary of the People's Democratic Party of Afghanistan
- In office 1 January 1965 – 14 September 1979
- Preceded by: Office established
- Succeeded by: Hafizullah Amin

Chairman of the Revolutionary Council of Afghanistan Head of State
- In office 30 April 1978 (Note: Sometimes the 1 May 1978 is named.) – 14 September 1979
- Vice President: Babrak Karmal; Hafizullah Amin
- Preceded by: Mohammad Daoud Khan (as President); Abdul Qadir (acting)
- Succeeded by: Hafizullah Amin

Chairman of the Council of Ministers Head of Government
- In office 1 May 1978 – 27 March 1979
- Preceded by: Mohammad Musa Shafiq (1973)
- Succeeded by: Hafizullah Amin

Personal details
- Born: 14 July 1917 Nawa, Ghazni Province, Emirate of Afghanistan
- Died: 9 October 1979 (aged 62) Kabul, Afghanistan
- Cause of death: Assassination by suffocation
- Party: People's Democratic Party of Afghanistan (Khalq)
- Spouse: Nur Bibi
- Education: Kabul University
- Occupation: Politician
- Profession: Politician, revolutionary, journalist, writer, poet
- Top Leader: ← (First in role); Amin →

Nur Muhammad Taraki (Pashto: نور محمد ترکی; 14 July 1917 – 9 October 1979) was an Afghan communist politician, revolutionary, journalist and writer. He was a founding member of the People's Democratic Party of Afghanistan (PDPA) who served as its General Secretary from 1965 to 1979 and Chairman of the Revolutionary Council from 1978 to 1979.

Taraki was born in Nawa, Ghazni Province. He received his primary and secondary education in Pishin district in Balochistan and graduated from Kabul University, after which he started his political career as a journalist. From the 1940s onward Taraki also wrote novels and short stories in the socialist realism style. Forming the PDPA at his residence in Kabul along with Babrak Karmal, he was elected as the party's General Secretary at its first congress. He ran as a candidate in the 1965 Afghan parliamentary election but failed to win a seat. In 1966 he published the Khalq, a party newspaper advocating for class struggle, but the government closed it down shortly afterward. In 1978 he, Hafizullah Amin and Babrak Karmal initiated the Saur Revolution and established the Democratic Republic of Afghanistan.

Taraki's leadership was short-lived and marked by controversies. The government was divided between two PDPA factions: the Khalqists (led by Taraki), the majority, and the Parchamites. Taraki along with his "protégé" Amin started a purge of the government and party that led to several high-ranking Parchamite members being sent into de facto exile by being assigned to serve overseas as ambassadors, and later started jailing domestic Parchamites. His regime locked up dissidents and oversaw massacres of villagers, citing the necessity of Red Terror by the Bolsheviks in Soviet Russia, that opponents of the Saur Revolution had to be eliminated. These factors, among others, triggered a popular backlash that led to a full-blown rebellion. Despite repeated attempts, Taraki was unable to persuade the Soviet Union to intervene in support of the restoration of civil order. Amin initiated most of these policies behind the scenes.

Taraki's reign was marked by a cult of personality centered around him that Amin had cultivated. The state press and subsequent propaganda started to refer to him as the "Great Leader" and "Great Teacher", and his portrait became a common sight throughout the country. His relationship with Amin turned sour during his rule, ultimately resulting in Taraki's overthrow on 14 September 1979 and subsequent murder on 8 October, on Amin's orders, with Kabul press reporting that he died of illness. His death was a factor that led to the Soviet intervention in December 1979.

== Early life and career ==
Taraki was born on 14 July 1917 to a Ghilji Pashtun Tarakai peasant family in the Nawa District of Ghazni Province, part of what was then the Emirate of Afghanistan. He was the oldest of three children and attended a village school in Nawa, before leaving in 1932 what had become the Kingdom of Afghanistan, at the age of 15, to work in the port city of Bombay, India. There, he met a Kandahari merchant family who employed him as a clerk for the Pashtun Trading Company. Taraki's first encounter with communism was during his night courses, where he met several Communist Party of India members who impressed him with their discussions on social justice and communist values. Another important event was his encounter with Khan Abdul Ghaffar Khan, a Pashtun nationalist and leader of the Red Shirt Movement in neighbouring India, who was an admirer of the works of Vladimir Lenin.

In 1937, Taraki started working for Abdul Majid Zabuli, the Minister of Economics, who introduced him to several Russians. Later Taraki became Deputy Head of the Bakhtar News Agency and became known throughout the country as an author and poet. His best known book, the De Bang Mosaferi, highlights the socio-economic difficulties facing Afghan workers and peasants. His works were translated into Russian language in the Soviet Union, where his work was viewed as embodying scientific socialist themes. He was hailed by the Soviet Government as "Afghanistan's Maxim Gorky". On his visit to the Soviet Union Taraki was greeted by Boris Ponomarev, the Head of the International Department of the Communist Party of the Soviet Union, and other Communist Party of the Soviet Union members.

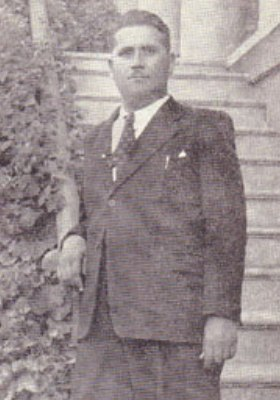
A younger Taraki

Under Sardar Mohammad Daoud Khan's prime ministership, suppression of radicals was common. However, because of his language skills, Taraki was sent to the Afghan Embassy in the United States in 1952. Within several months, Taraki began denouncing the Royal Afghan Government under King Zahir, and accused it of being autocratic and dictatorial. His denunciation of the Royal Afghan Government earned him much publicity in the United States. It also attracted unfavourable attention from authorities back home, who relieved him of his post and ordered him repatriated but stopped short of placing him under arrest. After a short period of unemployment, Taraki started working for the United States Overseas Mission in Kabul as an interpreter. He quit that job in 1958 and established his own translation company, the Noor Translation Bureau. Four years later, he started working for the U.S. Embassy in Kabul, but quit in 1963 to focus on the establishment of the People's Democratic Party of Afghanistan (PDPA), a communist political party.

At the founding congress of the PDPA, held in his own home in Kabul's Karte Char district, Taraki won a competitive election against Babrak Karmal to the post of general secretary on 1 January 1965. Karmal became second secretary. Taraki ran as a candidate for the PDPA during the September 1965 parliamentary election but did not win a seat. Shortly after the election, he launched Khalq, the first major left-wing newspaper in Afghanistan. The paper was banned within one month of its first printing. In 1967, less than two years after its founding, the PDPA split into several factions. The largest of these included Khalq (Masses) led by Taraki, and Parcham (Banner) led by Karmal. The main differences between the factions were ideological, with Taraki supporting the creation of a Leninist-like state, while Karmal wanted to establish a "broad democratic front".

On 17 April 1978, a prominent leftist named Mir Akbar Khyber was assassinated and the murder was blamed on Mohammed Daoud Khan's Republic of Afghanistan. His death served as a rallying point for the pro-communist Afghans. Fearing a communist coup d'état, Daoud ordered the arrest of certain PDPA leaders, including Taraki and Karmal, while placing others such as Hafizullah Amin under house arrest. On 27 April 1978, the Saur Revolution was initiated, reportedly by Amin while still under house arrest. Khan was killed the next day along with most of his family. The PDPA rapidly gained control and on 1 May Taraki became Chairman of the Revolutionary Council, a role which subsumed the responsibilities of both president and Chairman of the Council of Ministers (literally prime minister in Western parlance). The country was then renamed the Democratic Republic of Afghanistan (DRA), installing a regime that would last until April 1992.

== Leadership ==
=== Establishment and purge ===
Taraki cabinet (1978–1979)
Office	Incumbent	Took office	Left office
Deputy Chairman of the Council of Ministers	Babrak Karmal	30 April	5 July 1978
Deputy Chairman of the Council of Ministers	Hafizullah Amin	30 April	27 March 1979
Deputy Chairman of the Council of Ministers	Muhammad Aslam Watanjar	30 April	27 March
Minister of Foreign Affairs	Hafizullah Amin	30 April	27 March
Minister of Communications	Muhammad Aslam Watanjar	30 April	27 March
Minister of National Defence	Abdul Qadir	30 April	17 August 1978
Minister of National Defence	Nur Muhammad Taraki (de facto, not de jure)	17 August	27 March
Minister of Health	Shah Wali	30 April	27 March
Minister of Interior	Nur Ahmad Nur	30 April	5 July 1978
Minister of Education	Ghulam Dastagir Panjsheri	30 April	28 August 1978
Minister of Education	Abdul Rashid Jalili	28 August	27 March
Minister of Planning	Sultan Ali Keshtmand	30 April	23 August 1978
Minister of Planning	Muhammad Siddiq Alemyar	23 August	27 March
Minister of Radio, Television	Sulaiman Layeq	30 April	27 March
Minister of Agriculture	Saleh Muhammad Zirai	30 April	27 March
Minister of Finance	Abdul Karim Misaq	30 April	27 March
Minister of Information, Culture	Muhammad Hasan Bareq-Shafi'	30 April	27 March
Minister of Justice, Attorney General	Abdul Hakim Shara'i	30 April	27 March
Minister of Social Affairs	Anahita Ratebzad	30 April	27 March
Minister of Commerce	Abdul Quddus Ghorbandi	30 April	27 March
Minister of Mines, Industries	Muhammad Isma'il Danesh	30 April	27 March
Minister of Public Works	Muhammad Rafie	30 April	28 August 1978
Minister of Public Works	Dastagir Panjsheri	28 August	27 March
Minister of Water, Power	Muhammad Mansur Hashimi	30 April	27 March
Minister of Higher Education	Mahmud Suma	30 April	27 March
Minister of Tribal Affairs	Nizamuddin Tahzib	30 April	27 March
Minister of Border Affairs	Sahibjan Sahrayi	28 August	27 March

Taraki was appointed Chairman of the Revolutionary Council (head of state) and Chairman of the Council of Ministers (head of government) while retaining his post as PDPA general secretary (supreme leader). He initially formed a government which consisted of both Khalqists and Parchamites; Karmal became Deputy Chairman of the Presidium of the Revolutionary Council while Amin became Minister of Foreign Affairs and Deputy Chairman of the Council of Ministers. Internal problems soon arose and several prominent Khalqists accused the Parcham faction of conspiring against the Taraki government. A Khalqi purge of the Parcham then began with the faction's most prominent members being sent out of the country: Karmal became Afghan Ambassador to Czechoslovakia and Mohammad Najibullah became Afghan Ambassador to Iran. Internal struggle was not only to be found between the Khalqist and Parchamites; tense rivalry between Taraki and Amin had begun in the Khalq faction with both vying for control.

Karmal was recalled from Czechoslovakia but rather than returning to Afghanistan he went into hiding with Anahita Ratebzad, his friend and former Afghan ambassador to Yugoslavia, as he feared execution if he returned. Muhammad Najibullah followed them. Taraki consequently stripped them of all official titles and political authority.

The new government, under Taraki, launched a campaign of repression against opponents of the Saur Revolution, which killed thousands, mostly at Pul-e-Charkhi prison. Estimates for the number executed at the prison, between April 1978 and December 1979, are as high as 27,000.

=== Socio-economic changes ===
==== Land reform ====
Taraki's Government initiated a land reform on 1 January 1979 which attempted to limit the amount of land a family could own. Those whose landholdings exceeded the limit saw their property requisitioned by the government without compensation. The Afghan leadership believed the reform would be met with popular approval amongst the rural population while weakening the power of the bourgeoisie. The reform was declared complete in mid-1979 and the government proclaimed that 665,000 hectares (approximately 1,632,500 acres) had been redistributed. The government also declared that only 40,000 families, or 4 percent of the population, had been negatively affected by the land reform.

Contrary to government expectations, the reform was neither popular nor productive. Agricultural harvests plummeted and the reform itself led to rising discontent amongst Afghans. When Taraki realized the degree of popular dissatisfaction with the reform he quickly abandoned the policy. However, the land reform was gradually implemented under the later Karmal administration, although the proportion of land area impacted by the reform is unclear.

==== Other reforms ====
In the months following the coup, Taraki and other party leaders initiated other radical Marxist policies that challenged both traditional Afghan values and well-established traditional power structures in rural areas. Taraki introduced women to political life and legislated an end to forced marriage. However, he ruled over a nation with a deep Islamic religious culture and a long history of resistance to any type of strong centralized governmental control, and consequently many of these reforms were not actually implemented nationwide. Popular resentment of Taraki's drastic policy changes triggered surging unrest throughout the country, reducing government control to only a limited area. The strength of this anti-reform backlash would ultimately lead to the Afghan civil war.

Traditional practices that were deemed feudal—such as usury, bride price and forced marriage—were banned, and the minimum age of marriage was raised. The government stressed education for both women and men, and launched an ambitious literacy campaign.

Under the previous administration of Mohammad Daoud Khan, a literacy programme created by UNESCO had been launched with the objective of eliminating illiteracy within 20 years. The government of Taraki attempted to reduce this time frame from 20 to four years, an unrealistic goal in light of the shortage of teachers and limited government capacity to oversee such an initiative. The duration of the project was later lengthened to seven years by the Soviets in the aftermath of the Soviet intervention. The cultural focus of the UNESCO programme was declared "rubbish" by Taraki, who instead chose to introduce a political orientation by utilizing PDPA leaflets and left-wing pamphlets as basic reading material.

On 19 August 1978, Afghan Independence Day, Taraki started the broadcasts of Afghanistan National Television, the first TV channel in the country.

=== Afghan–Soviet relations ===
We believe it would be a fatal mistake to commit ground troops. [...] If our troops went in, the situation in your country would not improve. On the contrary, it would get worse. Our troops would have to struggle not only with an external aggressor, but with a significant part of your own people. And the people would never forgive such things"

— Alexei Kosygin, the Chairman of the USSR Council of Ministers, in response to Taraki's request for Soviet presence in Afghanistan

Taraki signed a Twenty-Year Treaty of Friendship with the Soviet Union on 5 December 1978 which greatly expanded Soviet aid to his regime. Following the Herat uprising, Taraki contacted Alexei Kosygin, chairman of the USSR Council of Ministers, and asked for "practical and technical assistance with men and armament". Kosygin was unfavorable to the proposal on the basis of the negative political repercussions such an action would have for his country, and he rejected all further attempts by Taraki to solicit Soviet military aid in Afghanistan. Following Kosygin's rejection Taraki requested aid from Leonid Brezhnev, the general secretary of the Communist Party of the Soviet Union and Soviet head of state, who warned him that full Soviet intervention "would only play into the hands of our enemies – both yours and ours". Brezhnev also advised Taraki to ease up on the drastic social reforms and to seek broader support for his regime.

In 1979, Taraki attended a conference of the Non-Aligned Movement in Havana, Cuba. On his way back he stopped in Moscow on 20 March and met with Brezhnev, foreign minister Andrei Gromyko and other Soviet officials. It was rumoured that Karmal was present at the meeting in an attempt to reconcile Taraki's Khalq faction and the Parcham against Amin and his followers. At the meeting, Taraki was successful in negotiating some Soviet support, including the redeployment of two Soviet armed divisions at the Soviet–Afghan border, the sending of 500 military and civilian advisers and specialists, and the immediate delivery of Soviet armed equipment sold at 25 percent below the original price. However, the Soviets were not pleased about the developments in Afghanistan and Brezhnev impressed upon Taraki the need for party unity. Despite reaching this agreement with Taraki, the Soviets continued to be reluctant to intervene further in Afghanistan and repeatedly refused Soviet military intervention within Afghan borders during Taraki's rule as well as later during Amin's short rule.

=== Taraki–Amin break ===
In the first months after the April 1978 revolution, Hafizullah Amin and Taraki had a very close relationship. Taraki reportedly remarked, "Amin and I are like nail and flesh, not separable". Amin set about constructing a personality cult centered on Taraki. In party and government meetings Amin always referred to Taraki as "The Great Leader", "The Star of the East" or "The Great Thinker" among other titles, while Amin was given such titles as "The True Disciple and Student". Amin would later come to realize he had created a monster when the Kim Il Sung-style personality cult he had created inspired Taraki to become overly confident and believe in his own brilliance. Taraki began discounting Amin's suggestions, fostering in Amin a deep sense of resentment. As their relationship turned increasingly sour, a power struggle developed between them for the control of the Afghan Army. Their relations came to a head later that year when Taraki accused Amin of nepotism after Amin had appointed several family members to high-ranking positions.

On 3 August 1978, a KGB delegation visited Afghanistan, and on first impression of general Oleg Kalugin, Taraki "did not have the physical strength or the backing to continue to lead the country for long", adding that Amin was a "far more impressive figure".

Taraki could count on the support of four prominent army officers in his struggle against Amin: Aslam Watanjar, Sayed Mohammad Gulabzoy, Sherjan Mazdoryar and Assadullah Sarwari. These men had joined the PDPA not because of ideological reasons, but instead due to their lofty political ambitions. They also had developed a close relationship with Alexander Puzanov, the Soviet ambassador in Afghanistan, who was eager to use them against Amin. After the Herat uprising on 17 March 1979, the PDPA Politburo and the Revolutionary Council established the Homeland Higher Defence Council, to which Taraki was elected its chairman while Amin became its deputy. At around the same time, Taraki left his post as Council of Ministers chairman and Amin was elected his successor. Amin's new position offered him little real influence, however; as Chairman of the Council of Ministers, Amin had the power to elect every member of the cabinet, but all of them had to be approved by the head of state, Taraki. In reality, through this maneuver Taraki had effectively reduced Amin's power base by forcing him to relinquish his hold on the Afghan Army in order to take on the supposedly heavy responsibilities of his new but ultimately powerless post.

During Taraki's foreign visit to the 6th Summit of the Non-Aligned Movement in Cuba, his Gang of Four had received an intelligence report that Amin was planning to arrest or kill them. This report, it turned out, was incorrect. Nonetheless, the Gang of Four were ordered to assassinate Amin, its leader Sarwari selecting his nephew Aziz Akbari to conduct the assassination. However, Akbari was not informed that he was the chosen assassin or that it was a secret mission, and he confided the information to contacts in the Soviet embassy. The embassy responded by warning Amin of the assassination attempt, thereby saving him from certain death.

== Assassination ==
On 11 September 1979, Chairman Taraki was greeted by Amin at the airport on his return to Kabul from Moscow. The flight was scheduled to land at 2:30, but Amin forced the delay of the landing by an hour as a demonstration to Taraki of his control over the government. Shortly afterward, Taraki, instead of reporting to the cabinet about the Havana Summit, indirectly tried to dismiss Amin from his position as per the plot of the Soviets. He sought to neutralise Amin's power and influence by requesting that he serve overseas as an ambassador, but Amin turned down the proposal, shouting "You are the one who should quit! Because of drink and old age you have taken leave of your senses." The following day, Taraki invited Amin to the Arg (the Presidential palace) for lunch with him and the Gang of Four. Amin turned down the offer, stating he would prefer their resignation rather than lunching with them. Soviet Ambassador Puzanov managed to persuade Amin to make the visit to the palace along with Sayed Daoud Tarun, the Chief of Police, and Nawab Ali (an intelligence officer). Inside the palace on 14 September, bodyguards within the building opened fire on the visitors. Tarun was killed but Amin only sustained injuries and escaped to his car, driving to the Ministry of Defence. Shortly afterwards, Amin placed the Army on high alert, ordered the detainment of Taraki, and telephoned Puzanov about the incident. That evening at 6:30, tanks from the 4th Armoured Corps entered the city and stood at government positions. Amin returned to the Arg with a contingent of Army officers and placed Taraki under arrest. The Gang of Four, however, had "disappeared", taking refuge at the Soviet embassy.

The Soviets tried to dissuade Amin from expelling Taraki and his associates from their positions, but Amin refused. On 15 September, a Soviet battalion at Bagram Air Base and the embassy were put in position in an attempt to rescue Taraki, but they were never ordered to make a move as they felt that Amin's forces had the edge. At 8pm on 16 September, Radio Kabul announced that Taraki had informed the PDPA Politburo that he was no longer able to continue his duties, and that the Politburo subsequently elected Amin as the new General Secretary. After Taraki's arrest, Amin reportedly discussed the incident with Leonid Brezhnev in which he said, "Taraki is still around. What should I do with him?" Brezhnev replied that it was his choice. Amin, who now believed he had the full support of the Soviets, ordered the death of Taraki. Taraki's death occurred on 9 October 1979, when he was (according to most accounts) suffocated with pillows by three men under Amin's orders. Taraki did not resist nor did he say anything as he was instructed by the men to lie down on a bed to be suffocated. His body was secretly buried by the men at night. The news shocked Brezhnev, who had vowed to protect Taraki. It was also one of the factors of the Soviet intervention two months later. The Afghan media reported two days later that the ailing Taraki had died of a "serious illness", omitting any mention of his murder.

== Post-death ==
On the day that Taraki was assassinated, 28 men and women from Taraki's extended family (including his wife and brother) were jailed at Pul-e-Charkhi prison. After Karmal came into power, Taraki's jailed relatives, including his widow, were released.

In the 2 January 1980 edition of the Kabul New Times (the day of the PDPA's 15th anniversary), the education minister Anahita Ratebzad called Taraki "the martyred son of the country", and denounced Hafizullah Amin as "this savage despot, beastly, lunatic, and recognised spy of the imperialism of America".

== Books ==
=== Novels ===
- De Bang musāfirī, his first and best-known novel, published in 1957, The Journey of Bang looks at the tribal Pashtun world through Marxist lenses, "an imitation in Pashto of the works of the Soviet novelist Maxim Gorky"
- Ṡaṛah, criticism of feudal lords of Afghanistan
- Sangsār
- Spīn
- Be tarbiyatah zoy

=== Short stories ===
- Mochī : da lanḍo kīso ṭolagah

=== Essays ===
- Pahāṛon̲ kā baiṭā : ek Pukhtun kī dāstān-i alam, written in Urdu, chiefly on socio-cultural and economical conditions in Balochistan

== Notes ==
Party political offices
New political party	General Secretary of the People's Democratic Party of Afghanistan; 1 January 1965 – 14 September 1979	Succeeded by Hafizullah Amin
Political offices
Preceded by Mohammed Daoud Khan as President	Chairman of the Revolutionary Council; 30 April 1978 – 14 September 1979	Succeeded by Hafizullah Amin
Vacant Title last held by Mohammad Musa Shafiq (1973) as Prime Minister	Chairman of the Council of Ministers; 1 May 1978 – 27 March 1979	Succeeded by Hafizullah Amin
