= Operation Baikal-79 =

1979–80 Soviet intervention in Afghanistan

- Part of Soviet–Afghan War
Date	25 December 1979–1 January 1980
Location	Kabul, Afghanistan
Result	Soviet victory: Pro-Soviet government installed under Babrak Karmal

Belligerents
Soviet Union	Afghanistan

Commanders and leaders
(Soviet Union) Yuri Drozdov	(Democratic Republic of Afghanistan) Hafizullah Amin †

Units involved
Committee for State Security (KGB); Alpha Group; Zenit Group; Main Intelligence Directorate; 154th Spetsnaz Detachment (Muslim Battalion); Soviet Armed Forces; 345th Guards Airborne Regiment; 103rd Guard Airborne Division	Presidential Guard: 26th Airborne Regiment

Strength
~30,000 troops total; 25 Alpha Group (Grom) operatives; 30 KGB Zenit operatives; 87 troops from 345th Airborne; 520 troops from Muslim Battalion	~700 soldiers (26th Airborne Regiment); More than 500 of Presidential Guards

Casualties and losses
Light	~300 Presidential Guards killed; ~700 Afghan paratroopers killed or captured

Operation Baikal-79 (Russian: Операция Байкал-79, Operatsiya Baykal-79) was the codename for the Soviet Union's military intervention in Afghanistan, initiated on December 25, 1979. The operation was aimed at taking control over approximately 20 key strongholds in and around Kabul, which included major military headquarters, communication centers and jails. It involved the deployment of approximately 30,000 Soviet troops into Afghanistan. A critical component of Operation Baikal-79 was Operation Storm-333, executed on 27 December 1979. This mission targeted the assassination of Afghan president Hafizullah Amin and the establishment of a Soviet-aligned government under Babrak Karmal. The assault on the Tajbeg Palace, Amin's residence, was carried out by a specialized force comprising KGB operatives and Soviet military personnel. The operation resulted in Amin's death and the installation of Karmal as the new leader.

== Background ==
In April 1978, the People's Democratic Party of Afghanistan (PDPA) seized power and established a pro-Soviet regime under Nur Muhammad Taraki, which initially led to cordial relations with the Soviet Union. However, internal rivalries within the PDPA soon surfaced, and in September 1979, Taraki was deposed and allegedly assassinated by his rival Hafizullah Amin. Amin’s rise to power, along with suspicions of his secret contacts with Western nations, alarmed the Soviet leadership, who feared a shift in Afghanistan's political alignment. The KGB went so far as to describe Amin as a "smooth-talking fascist who was secretly pro-Western." As Soviet-Afghan relations deteriorated, the USSR began backing exiled PDPA leader Babrak Karmal. On 12 December 1979, the Soviet Politburo authorized a military intervention, and on 27 December launched Operation Storm-333, the first phase of the Soviet invasion, which aimed to remove Amin and install Karmal as the head of state.

== Execution of the operation ==
The Soviet intervention commenced on December 25, 1979, with airborne divisions securing key locations in Kabul and other strategic areas. As part of the broader Baikal-79 operation, Soviet forces aimed to seize approximately 20 vital installations, including military headquarters, communication centers, and other government facilities. On 1 January 1980, Soviet paratroopers arrived at the Bala Hissar fortress and ordered the 26th Airborne Regiment to disarm, only for them to refuse and fire upon the Soviets as a firefight ensued. The Soviet paratroopers annihilated most of the regiment, with 700 Afghan paratroopers being killed or captured. In the aftermath of the battle, 26th Airborne Regiment was disbanded and later reorganised into the 37th Commando Brigade, led by Col. Shahnawaz Tanai, being the largest commando formation at a strength of three battalions. As a result of the battle with the 26th Airborne Regiment, the Soviet 357th Guards Airborne Regiment were permanently stationed in Bala Hissar fortress, meaning this new brigade was stationed as Rishkhor Garrison.

== Aftermath ==
Following the successful execution of Operation Baikal-79 and the establishment of Babrak Karmal's government, Soviet forces remained in Afghanistan to support the new regime. This intervention marked the beginning of a protracted conflict known as the Soviet–Afghan War, which lasted until 1989 and had significant implications for both Afghanistan and the Soviet Union.
