= Aeroflot Flight 36075 =

1986 Aircraft hijacking

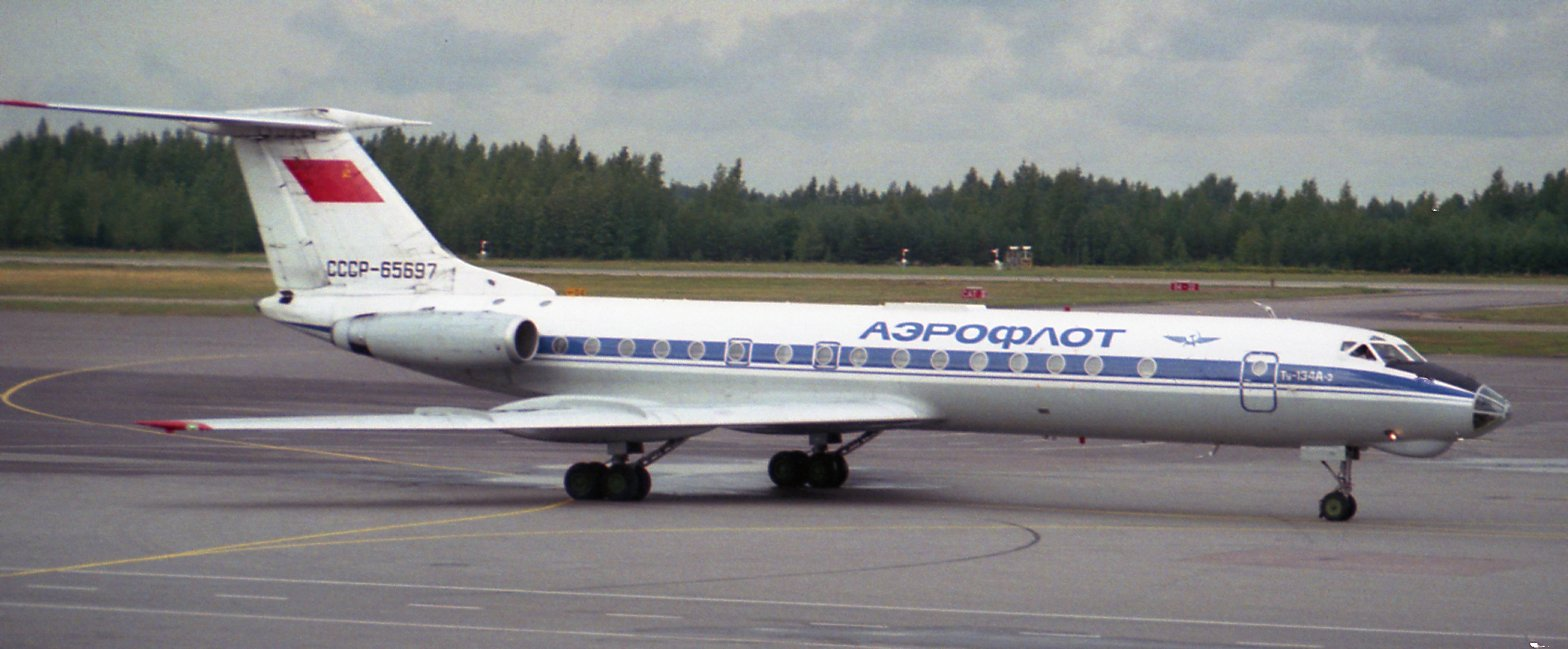
- An Aeroflot Tupolev Tu-134 similar to the one involved in the hijacking

Hijacking
- Date: 20 September 1986
- Summary: Hijacking
- Site: Ufa International Airport

Aircraft
- Aircraft type: Tupolev Tu-134A
- Operator: Aeroflot
- IATA flight No.: SU-36075
- Registration: USSR-65877
- Occupants: 83 (including 2 hijackers)
- Passengers: 78 (including 2 hijackers)
- Crew: 5
- Fatalities: 3 (including 1 hijacker)
- Injuries: 3 (including 1 hijacker)
- Survivors: 80

Aeroflot Flight 36075, known also as Tu-134 hijacking in Ufa (Russian: Захват Ту-134 в Уфе), was an aircraft hijacking committed by two deserting Internal Troops soldiers on September 20, 1986, at the Ufa International Airport. Three soldiers of the Internal Troops of the Ministry of Internal Affairs, Junior Sergeant Nikolai Matsnev, Private Sergei Yagmurdzhi and Private Aleksandr Konoval, stole a taxi early in the morning, shooting two policemen along the way. Konoval escaped after killing the policemen and was later arrested, while Matsnev and Yagmurdzhi, having reached the airport, stormed aboard a Tupolev Tu-134 and took 81 people hostage (76 passengers and 5 crew members). Two hostages were shot dead immediately after the hijacking. The criminals demanded that the plane be sent abroad to any country unfriendly to the Soviet Union, threatening to shoot the hostages. Alpha Group of the 7th Directorate of the KGB was called in to free the hostages, which stormed the plane after lengthy negotiations to free the hostages. Matsnev died in the ensuing shootout, and Yagmurdzhi was wounded in the leg. Flight attendants Elena Zhukovskaya and Susanna Zhabinets played an important role in rescuing the passengers, convincing both soldiers to release all the hostages.

== Background ==
All three future criminals, 20-year-old Junior Sergeant Nikolai Matsnev (born in 1966), 19-year-old Private Sergei Yagmurdzhi (born in 1967) and 19-year-old Private Aleksandr Konoval, were serving in military unit 6520 of the Internal Troops of the Soviet Ministry of Internal Affairs, stationed in Ufa in a building on Karl Marx Street. They were listed in the so-called non-staff group for the capture and liberation of an airplane from terrorists, so they specifically studied the plans of all airplanes from the An-12 to the Tu-134, and also repeatedly trained to penetrate the airplane and use special means to fight terrorists.

Before joining the army, Matsnev studied at the Arkhangelsk Naval School: he only went on a few voyages as part of training exercises, but he often talked to his fellow soldiers about travelling abroad and encouraged them to escape. A few months after the start of practical training, he proposed a bold plan to his fellow soldiers: to hijack an airplane, armed with modern small arms, and demand that the pilots fly the plane abroad, where they could later hide and live as they pleased. However, none of the conspirators had a clear idea of where they were going to fly. The reason for the talk about escaping abroad was that all three soldiers were guarding prisoners from whom they purchased drugs, and at some point their superiors found out about these actions. The soldiers were afraid of ending up in a penal colony, where, as former guards, they faced the fate of being constantly subjected to beatings and humiliation. Yagmurdzhi and Matsnev themselves had used drugs while still in the civil service, and Matsnev was a long-time drug addict.

The plans were discussed with only three fellow soldiers: all six discussed the plans in the kitchen, not bothering to be secretive, and the officers of the unit who witnessed the conversations did not attach much importance to what they heard, considering it all to be nothing more than empty chatter. As a result, Matsnev led a group of four conspirators, which, in addition to him, Yagmurdzhi and Konoval, included Private Igor Fedotkin.

== Hijacking a taxi ==
On the night of 19-20 September 1986, Matsnev, Yagmurdzhi and Konoval, who had been assigned to duty in the company, left the unit without permission. Matsnev broke into the weapons room with the keys he had and took with him an RPK-74 machine gun, an AK assault rifle and an SVD sniper rifle, as well as 220 rounds of ammunition for them. The escape of the soldiers from the unit became known to the duty officer of the KGB of the Bashkir ASSR at 3:40 a.m. The soldiers climbed out the window of the canteen and fled the unit, stopping a taxi with the driver Nikolai Bashkirtsev and, under threat of reprisal, ordering him to go towards Podymalovo, where the fourth conspirator, Igor Fedotkin, was on guard. He was supposed to take an armored personnel carrier out of the park, which they were supposed to use to get to the airport. At first, the need to shoot at his fellow soldiers did not concern Fedotkin.

That night, it was pouring rain outside. As they approached the checkpoint on the way out of Ufa, Bashkirtsev convinced the soldiers that they were guaranteed to stop the taxi and that they would not be able to get through, but that they could get through in a private car without any problems. The conspirators decided to take another car, but at that moment they noticed a UAZ-469 police patrol car from the non-departmental security department of the Leninsky District Department of Internal Affairs of Ufa. Deciding that they were being followed, they opened fire on the stopped car. As a result of the shootout, Sergeant Zulfir Akhtyamov and Junior Sergeant Airat Galeev were killed, without even having time to react. About 60 bullets were fired at the car: it was known that the car had left in response to reports of three deserters fleeing.

Aleksandr Konoval, who was sitting in the back seat, was so scared that he immediately fled with an unloaded SVD rifle, leaving his accomplices alone. He caught a passing KAMAZ truck and asked for a lift to Podymalovo, claiming that he had left without permission to go on a date with a girlfriend. As it later became known, Fedotkin did not wait for his accomplices and abandoned the plan to steal an armored personnel carrier, and Konoval tried unsuccessfully to persuade Fedotkin to shoot him. The fugitive then hid in one of the owners' houses, telling the owners that he was on training exercises, but the house was later surrounded by soldiers. Konoval attempted to commit suicide by stabbing himself in the chest with a bayonet, but the deserter was saved by doctors.

== Hijacking of the airplane ==
Before reaching the airport, Matsnev and Yagmurdzhi abandoned the car and hid in the forest plantations. They were going to shoot Bashkirtsev, but he convinced the deserters not to kill him, promising them that his son would never serve in the Soviet Armed Forces. He immediately ran to the police officers, telling them what had happened. However, they did not send a squad to the airport, but took the driver to the head of the Ufa Ministry of Internal Affairs, which gave both deserters time to prepare to hijack the plane. At 04:40 they reached the Ufa International Airport. They made their way to the airfield, hiding in a ditch. The closest aircraft to them was a Boryspil Air Squadron Tu-134A of Aeroflot Airlines (aircraft USSR-65877), operating flight SU-36075 on the route Lvov - Kyiv - Ufa - Nizhnevartovsk and landing in Ufa for refueling. There were 81 people on board: 76 passengers (including eight women and six children) and 5 crew members. Most of the passengers were oil workers flying to Nizhnevartovsk for a shift change. During refueling, the passengers were sent to the waiting room. The ticket check was carried out by the person on duty for the meeting, Lyudmila Safronova, and the crew included stewardesses Elena Zhukovskaya (Ganich) and Susanna Zhabinets (Kibarova) and second pilot Vyacheslav Lutsenko.

An hour and a half earlier, the airport had received a call from the police warning about armed men heading towards the airport, but despite the warning, the planes were not stopped from boarding and the ramps were not pulled back, and the crew of Flight 36075 was completely unaware of the warning. At 04:43, the deserters found themselves on board Flight 36075, taking advantage of the fact that the flight engineer was busy removing the plugs from the engines and removing the parking brake chocks from under the wheels. The fugitives, having pushed the last passenger and duty officer Safronova inside the car, slammed the door behind them. The flight engineer did not notice the intrusion of strangers and, having climbed the ramp, tried to open the door, but was thrown down by a kick from a soldier's boot. Safronova's cries about armed men were initially perceived as a joke, but the captain of the plane ordered the door to be locked and everyone to take their seats, and he also dragged Vyacheslav Lutsenko into the cabin in time.

Matsnev took aim at Susanna Zhabinets and ordered Zhukovskaya to convey the demands to the crew - to take off within 20 minutes and direct the plane to "any country unfriendly to the Soviet Union" (the criminals themselves initially intended to fly to Pakistan), threatening to kill Zhabinets in case of refusal. 20 minutes later, shots were heard in the cabin. Yagmurdzhi shot with a machine gun passenger Alexander Ermoolenko, an assembler for the Zapsibneftegeofizika department, who was flying to Nizhnevartovsk for a shift: Ermoolenko, a large man with a criminal record, moved towards the soldier with threats. Matsnev, mistakenly deciding that someone was shooting at his accomplice, fired a burst from his machine gun: one woman who was covering a child was wounded in the shoulder by bullets, passenger Yaroslav Tikhansky (a shift worker, an electrician from the Ukrnafta drilling department) was also fatally wounded, and another bullet hit Yermoolenko's body.

== Rescue of hostages ==
Ground services were shocked by reports of the hijacking of the plane. All employees involved in the events under the Operation Alarm plan were immediately put on alert, and soon Alpha Group of the Seventh Directorate of the KGB arrived at the Ufa airport. The operation to free the hostages was led by the commander of Alpha Group, Gennady Zaitsev, who formed capture, support, observation, blocking and sniper groups, which took up their positions immediately. A temporary headquarters was set up in the airport building, headed by the head of the KGB of the Bashkir ASSR, Vadim Mishchenko: the headquarters did not break off communications with Moscow until the end of the operation.

Since Matsnev and Yagmurzhi were serving in a freelance anti-terrorist group, they knew the structure of the plane and the potential entrances and exits through which those who would attempt to free the hostages could enter. This seriously complicated the work of Alpha Group, and there were also reports of a possible sniper providing cover in the vicinity of the airfield, who was ultimately not found. Alpha Group operatives believed that they could only attack from the tail and from the cockpit of the plane, but both criminals knew this very well. Considering that they were armed with military weapons, the only chance to neutralize them was to shoot them immediately and on the spot, otherwise the deserters would have shot all the passengers. Meanwhile, Yagmurdzhi and Mantsev demanded that the crew members surrender all their service weapons: after consulting with management, the pilots handed over one pistol without cartridges, keeping the other pistol for themselves (the criminals did not know how many weapons the crew had). The passengers were not allowed to go to the toilet, although the flight attendants were free to walk around the cabin.

In the following hours, both flight attendants persuaded Yagmurdzhi and Mantsev to allow the body of the murdered Ermoolenko to be removed from the plane, then they released all the wounded and released four more women with children (this happened at approximately 06:20). Elena Zhukovskaya carried the body of the murdered Ermoolenko to the top of the stairs, since the hijackers were afraid to go out and come under possible sniper fire. She also carried out the bleeding Tikhansky: the hijackers demanded that she not go down the stairs, but she claimed that Tikhansky would not be able to walk, and was even forced to snap at Yagmurdzhi. The paramedics were afraid to approach the stairs to provide assistance to Tikhansky, which is why time was lost: the wounded man died in the ambulance on the way to hospital.

As time went on, Nikolai Matsnev became more and more embittered and aggressive, and Sergei Yagmurdzhi fell into a stupor. Elena suggested that Matsnev release some of the passengers so that the plane could take off faster: at about 07:50, he agreed to release 46 hostages (most of them were women, children, and the elderly), while leaving 20 men on board. All the remaining people were seated so that they were all within the hihackers' line of sight, and the soldiers changed into civilian clothes taken from the passengers' carry-on luggage. Knowing the possible actions of the Alpha Group soldiers, the hijackers blocked the emergency hatches and taped over the peephole of the door leading to the cockpit; one of the flight attendants removed it unnoticed. During this time, the aircraft commander reported to the ground about was happening on the plane: according to eyewitnesses, the commander's voice was shaking.

== Preparing for the assault ==
The plane was surrounded by police, military and KGB officers: there was not a single person within the airfield, but many passengers from other flights had gathered behind the fence surrounding the airfield to follow the events. The officers of Group A proceeded through the airport building to a designated room: according to a participant in those events, reserve lieutenant colonel Yevgeny Isakov, the operatives were working through all possible options for using weapons and means, including the use of explosives. Around 10 a.m., a Bashkir ASSR KGB officer, lieutenant colonel Anatoly Kotsaga, a former aviation engineer and employee of the Ufa airport, boarded the plane using the cover story of an airport employee, but was almost exposed because he did not smear his hands with machine oil. Matsnev, who had pointed a gun at him, ignored this strange moment. Kotsaga was the first to notice that Matsnev was in a state of drug intoxication.

Elena Zhukovskaya told both criminals that their demands to send the plane to a country unfriendly to the Soviet Union had been accepted on the ground, but Kotsaga added that the gunshots had pierced the skin of the plane, which had compromised the machine's airtightness; combined with the loud noises that were occurring (in fact, the noises were caused by the crew shaking the rudders, and the holes from the gunshots were not serious), repairs had to be made, which would take at least 12 hours. Kotsaga reported to the command headquarters intentionally loudly about the impossibility of the plane taking off, so that the criminals could hear it. Zhukovskaya suggested that they both transfer to another plane, but Yagmurdzhi and Matsnev demanded that all the problems on the existing plane be fixed and that they fly on it, threatening to start shooting the passengers if they refused. According to Isakov, the criminals demanded that they be given cigarettes, alcohol, and drugs several times during the day, and these demands were met. Kotsaga reported threats from both criminals to the ground. He also noted that they were unsure of themselves and did not know what to do next. Lyudmila Sofronova's husband Gennady, who was sent on the flight as a technician, was also involved in the operation: he walked along the fuselage of the wing several times to convince the attackers that technicians had arrived to repair the damaged skin.

Zaitsev directly negotiated with the criminals. In order to convince them to surrender, the officers brought a tape recording of Sergei Yagmurdzhi's mother, who urged her son to come to his senses. The former commander of the company where Yagmurdzhi and Matsnev served also served as a negotiator, which allowed the time to drag on until 14:00. Both initially insisted on full compliance with their demands, but under the influence of the substances they had taken, they changed their plans, admitting that no one would allow the plane to take off, and decided to commit suicide, which they reported to the company commander. In parallel, Alpha Group made the final decision to storm the plane, having practiced it on a neighboring plane, but at the same time, the operatives realized that there was a risk of death of passengers no matter what the outcome of events. The decision to storm the plane was to be made by the prosecutor of the Bashkir ASSR, but he thought about it for a long time, fearing that the criminals would shoot the people remaining in the cabin if they stormed it. In the end, he gave the go-ahead to storm the plane. The group entrusted with storming the plane was led by Viktor Zorkin.

== Drugs on board ==
The situation took an unexpected turn when Yagmurdzhi and Matsnev demanded that drugs be delivered to them on board — Matsnev demanded that "twenty ampoules, needles, and everything else — alcohol, a tourniquet, cotton wool" be prepared, and Yagmurdzhi also asked for a guitar, on which he could accompany himself. All the necessary things were to be delivered by the former commander of their company. Having learned of the demands of both, the Alpha Group operatives handed over a powerful sleeping pill along with the drugs. All the things were delivered at about 15:30: the soldiers ordered the flight attendants to wait until both were dead and only then negotiate with the ground services. According to the recollections of Elena Zhukovskaya, no more than ten packets were delivered on board: this dose was insufficient to kill both. Yagmurdzhi drank three ampoules and instantly lost consciousness, while the seasoned drug addict Matsnev did not touch the drugs, but also fell asleep.

Taking advantage of both soldiers being asleep, Zhukovskaya removed the machine gun from Yagmurdzhi's lap, taking it to the cockpit She had to wait about three minutes before the pilots reacted. Both flight attendants also carefully wrapped the machine gun around Matsnev's neck with the passengers' jackets, expecting that the criminal would spend more time than usual and would not have time to shoot. The flight attendants informed the special forces on duty that the deserters were asleep and that they could be captured, but the order to storm had not been given at that time. At approximately 16:30 Sergei fell and woke up Nikolai Matsnev, but Elena did not give Matsnev time to come to his senses, immediately offering him the remaining ampoules (according to some reports, Zhukovskaya secretly added ammonia to the mixture of these ampoules). Matsnev poured all the ampoules together, drank them in one gulp and began to wander around the cabin, and soon he began to vomit. After further requests from Zhukovskaya, Matsnev agreed to release all the remaining hostages and ordered a ladder to be driven up to the front door of the first cabin, along which all the passengers and both flight attendants descended. None of them were hurt; at the same time, part of Zorkin's capture group unloaded the rear luggage compartment and gained access to the rear cabin from the tail of the plane, pulling out both flight attendants from there and taking up positions in the tail of the plane.

== Assault ==
When all the passengers had exited and the cabin door had slammed shut, Matsnev came to his senses and realized that he did not have a machine gun at hand. After shaking the sleepy Yagmurdzhi awake, he tried to break down the door to the cabin with the butt of his machine gun, threatening to shoot all the hostages: there was a risk that both criminals would open fire and finish off the people in the cabin. At about this moment, the operatives began the assault, having received permission to eliminate the criminals if they fired back. All the fighters acted without body armor in order to get into the cabin silently and as quickly as possible. The idea of acting without body armor was suggested during the exercises by Sergei Kolomeets, and during training, operative Alexander Starikov experimentally proved that it was possible to quickly disarm a criminal, although there was still a risk of fatal injury if any of the fighters were shot.

Several operatives who had climbed into the cockpit through the window suggested that the crew members leave the same way, but Safronova was unable to do so due to her heavy build, and the pilots did not want to abandon her. Leaving them where they were, the fighters burst into the first cabin, where Matsnev and Yagmurdzhi were hiding: the operatives had first moved Lyudmila Safronova to the safest place, covering her with a briefcase containing a metal logbook. Zorkin's group, which was operating from behind, threw two flash-bang grenades into the second cabin, thereby distracting Matsnev's attention, while the fighters who had run out of the cockpit opened fire on the criminal. In the ensuing shootout, Matsnev managed to fire several shots from his machine gun, but the return bullets fanned out into the ceiling, and he himself was killed by shots to the head and body. Yagmurdzhi tried to take the machine gun that had fallen from the hands of his accomplice, but was wounded in the instep: his leg had to be amputated to save his life. The entire fight against Matsnev and Yagmurdzhi lasted about 6 seconds, and more than 14 and a half hours passed from the moment the group was raised on alert until the end of the operation.

== Consequences ==
Six people appeared before the court: Aleksandr Konoval, Sergei Yagmurdzhi and four other soldiers (including Fedotkin), accused of concealing the crime. On 22 May 1987, Sergei Yagmurdzhi was found guilty by a military tribunal and sentenced to death by firing squad. The sentence was carried out on 1 June 1988. At the trial, Yagmurdzhi did not admit his guilt and did not repent, expressing regret only that he did not follow through with the case. On the same day, Konoval was found guilty under a number of articles of the Criminal Code of the RSFSR (including attempted hijacking of an aircraft, car theft, illegal possession of narcotics and incitement to their use) and sentenced to 10 years' imprisonment with confiscation of property and serving his sentence in a penal colony. He served his sentence in the Perm-35 penal colony before being released under the amnesty of 7 February 1992 announced by Russian president Boris Yeltsin. Konoval later found a job, married and became a father of two children. Fedotkin, who guarded the warehouses, and three other people accused of concealing the crime were sentenced to prison terms ranging from 2 to 6 years. The Supreme Court of the Soviet Union upheld the sentences. As a result of the incident, commander-in-chief of the Internal Troops, general Ivan Yakovlev was forced to resign.

The decisive role in saving the lives of the passengers was played by Elena Zhukovskaya and her colleague Susanna Zhabinets, who, according to Alpha Group veteran Nikolai Kalitkin, performed "90% of all the work" to save the hostages. Both flight attendants were awarded the Order of the Red Banner. It was later revealed that Zhukovskaya was pregnant at the time of the incident with flight Tu-134. Gennady Safronov, who was on duty at the plane until the end of the operation, was awarded the Order of the Badge of Honor, and his wife Lyudmila was awarded the Medal "For Labour Valour" (the award ceremony took place in an empty hall of the Soviet Ministry of Civil Aviation, since the investigation was not completed and the case was not made public). Anatoly Kotsaga was also awarded the Order of the Red Banner. Police officers Airat Galeev and Zalfir Akhtyamova, killed during the chase, were posthumously awarded the Order of the Red Star: Galeev was buried in the village of Balyshly in the Blagovarsky District, and Akhtyamova in the Kushnarenkovsky District. Every year, memorial events are held at the graves of the deceased police officers with the participation of Rosgvardia officers.

At the same time, a criminal case was opened against Viktor Blinov, who shot Matsnev and wounded Yagmurdzhi, and also took the criminals' weapons and handed them over to the command, in connection with statements that shooting from combat weapons was permitted only in extreme cases. Investigators, having studied all the circumstances of the incident, closed the case, ruling that the Alpha Group fighter at that time had authority to shoot from combat weapons: permission to use the weapon was given by the prosecutor of the Bashkir ASSR.

The events related to the hijacking of the plane and the release of the hostages are described in the documentary film "Crew" (directed by Boris Fyodorov) from the series "Investigation Led" with Leonid Kanevsky. Filming of the film began in the winter of 2009 with interviews with participants in those events, and in May 2010, subsequent filming of the reconstruction of the events took place at the Ufa Airport. The NTV creative team was provided with assistance during filming.
