= Yuri Drozdov =

Yuri Drozdov may refer to:

- Yuri Drozdov (footballer) (born 1972), Russian football player and coach
- Yuri Drozdov (general) (1925–2017), Russian KGB general
