= Abu Omar Muhammad Al-Saif =

Chechen terrorist of Saudi descent

- أبو عمر السيف
- Born: Saudi Arabia
- Died: 11 July 2001; Mayrtup, Kurchaloevsky District, Chechnya, Russia
- Cause of death: Assassination
- Military career
- Allegiance: Ichkeria; Mujahideen in Chechnya
- Service years: 1994-2001
- Known for: 1999 apartment bombings
- Conflicts: First Chechen war Second Chechen war

Abu Omar Muhammad Al-Saif (Arabic:أبو عمر السيف; died 11 July 2001) is an arab terrorist and one of the leaders of the armed formations of the Chechen separatists in 1994-2001. One of the most known lieutenants of Ibn al-Khattab. He trained terrorists who carried out a number of terrorist attacks, including the bombings of apartment buildings in Russian cities in September 1999.

== Biography ==
Abu Omar studied in religious educational institutions in Jordan and Saudi Arabia. In the 1990s he came to Chechnya. During the First Chechen War, he led a small group of militants within Khattab's forces, which blew up Russian troop columns with land mines and mined military units and checkpoints. In December 1997, during the attack on 136th Separate Guards Motor Rifle Brigade military town Abu Omar stepped on a mine and lost his leg.

Question: Do you know who gave the order to commit the terrorist attacks in September 1999?

Answer: Abu Umar gave the order directly to me, and as far as I know, Khattab gave it to him. Abu Umar reported directly to Khattab and would not have done anything without his orders.

— From the interrogation protocol of Adam Dekkushev, 26 July 2002

Together with Khattab and Abu Jafar (whose deputy he was), he opened the "Kavkaz" terrorist training center in Chechnya, located on the outskirts of Serzhen-Yurt. Abu Umar personally taught explosives handling. Among the hundreds of graduates of this center were Denis Saitakov, Achimez Gochiyaev, and other organizers of the apartment building bombings in Russian cities in September 1999. Another terrorist group, trained by Abu Umar, carried out a series of terrorist attacks in Vladikavkaz, Mineralnye Vody, Pyatigorsk, and Nevinnomyssk in 2000–2001.

Shamsuddin Batukaev recalled how, after Zelimkhan Yandarbiyev issued a decree replacing secular courts with Sharia courts, Abu Umar declared that he would be able to quickly train “Sharia judges even from among those who do not speak Arabic.”

He was killed in July 2001 during a special operation by officers of the FSB Special Purpose Center. At the time of his assassination, he led a sabotage group of approximately 20 militants. Along with Shamil Basayev and Khattab, he was considered one of the most influential militant leaders.

A Russian court posthumously recognized him as one of the masterminds behind the terrorist attacks in Buinaksk, Moscow and Volgodonsk in 1999.
