= Vympel =

Russian elite special forces unit

Directorate "V" of the FSB Special Purpose Center
- Spetsgruppa "V"; Vympel
- Vympel Emblem
- Active: 1981–present
- Country: Soviet Union (1981–1991); Russian Federation (1991–present)
- Allegiance: FSB
- Type: Spetsnaz
- Role: Clandestine operation Counterterrorism; Covert operation Direct action HUMINT; Military intelligence Special operations
- Size: Classified
- Part of: Soviet Union (1981–1991): KGB; Russia: GUO (1993–1995); FSB Special Forces Center (1999–present)
- Garrison/HQ: Mainly different Moscow districts
- Motto: Служить и защищать
- Colors: Green or Red
- Mascot: Parachute
- Engagements: Soviet Union: Soviet–Afghan War; Soviet coup d'état attempt; Russia: Russian constitutional crisis; First Chechen War; Second Chechen War; Moscow theatre hostage crisis; Beslan school hostage crisis; Insurgency in the North Caucasus; Annexation of Crimea by the Russian Federation; Russian intervention in the Syrian civil war; Russian invasion of Ukraine

Commanders
- Current commander: Col. Vladimir Nana Boahene
- Notable commanders: Gen. Vitaly Bubenin; Gen. Viktor Karpukhin

Directorate "V" of the FSB Special Purpose Center, often referred to as Spetsgruppa "V" Vympel (pennant in Russian,), but also known as KGB Directorate "V", Vega Group, is a stand-alone sub-unit of Russia's special forces within the Russian Special Purpose Center of the Federal Security Service (FSB).

Vympel is the sister unit of Spetsgruppa "A" (Alpha Group), an FSB unit.

== Origins ==
=== KUOS ===
As most of the training in the KGB academy concentrated on plainclothes operational work focused on espionage and counter-espionage, in 1955 the First Chief Directorate of the service established the Development Courses for Officer Personnel (Курсы усовершенствования офицерского состава (КУОС), Latinized abbreviation KUOS) – a training cadre with the purpose of training general duty KGB officers in irregular warfare and combat tactics for clandestine operations overseas or as a stay-behind cadre and backbone for the formation of partisan units in case of a foreign invasion. In 1966 these courses were taken out of the structure of the First Chief Directorate and co-located as an independent training center together with the training center of the Soviet Border Troops (the KGB's own military force) in Golitsyno, Moscow Oblast. The KUOS graduates had their baptism by fire during the Prague Spring in 1968. A year later the KUOS was absorbed into the KGB Academy (Higher Red Banner School of KGB of the USSR, ВКШ КГБ СССР) as part of the students' curriculum – initially a three-month course. In 1970 the KUOS relocated again to Balashikha, the position of the director was promoted from a KGB Major/Captain 2nd Rank to a KGB Colonel/Captain 1st Rank and the duration of the training increased to seven months.

=== Zenyth ===
The main purpose of the KUOS center was the regular and irregular combat training of KGB Academy cadets as part of the establishment's curriculum. The secondary purpose was in case of a rising tension in a specific region to generate a tailored task group out of the cadets currently in an advanced stage of their training. Such example is the Operation Storm-333 (Операция Шторм-333), which gained a legendary status in Russia. From the cadre of KUOS the Special Operations Task Group Zenyth was formed to take part in the liquidation of the Afghan leader Hafizullah Amin alongside the Grom Team (Russian for "thunder") of the KGB's Alpha Group. The Zenyth Task Group was headed personally by the director of KUOS Colonel Grigoriy Boyarinov (who was in charge of the KUOS since it became an independent structure in 1969). Since Hafizullah Amin came to power by ordering the assassination of his predecessor Nur Muhammad Taraki and fearing he would be ousted from power the same way he asked the Soviet government to provide his protective detail. The combined KGB Grom and Zenyth contingent was deployed in that role, wearing Afghan army uniforms without identification. Later, when the Soviet leadership re-evaluated the situation and ordered a military intervention the dual characteristics of those KGB officers as intelligence operatives with advanced combat training and their location within the Presidential Palace made them ideal to both gather intel on the actions of the Afghan leadership and spearhead the assault on the residence, opening the way for the "Muslim Battalion" (154th Special Operations Independent Force – 154-й Отдельный отряд специального назначения) of the GRU Spetsnaz. Col. Boyarinov was killed in the fighting along with 5 operatives of Grom and Zenyth. Storm-333 is a rare example of KGB Spetsnaz and GRU Spetsnaz operating in concert.

=== Kaskad and Omega ===
After the full-scale invasion of Soviet forces within the Afghan People's Republic in July 1980 the KGB ordered the KUOS to form another special operations task force - Kaskad (Каскад, Russian for "cascade"). From July 1980 until April 1983 the Kaskad made four tours to Afghanistan in different composition and with different duration, so the four task forces are known simply as Kaskad-1 (6 months), Kaskad-2 (6 months), Kaskad-3 (9 months) and Kaskad-4 (12 months). Unlike the CIA the KGB operated both in intelligence and counter-intelligence capacities, so in contrast to the Zenyth Task Group, which was tailored to a specific operation and concentrated on intelligence gathering, the Kaskad Task Groups were organised to provide support to the KGB counter intelligence operatives in theater, suppressing covert activities in the towns and hunting down agents cross-country. In addition those task groups had the mission to select, train and mentor groups of Afghans which would take over their duties once the Kaskad is brought back to the Soviet Union and dissolved.

In April 1983 the Kaskad-4 was relieved by the Omega Special Operations Task Group (Отряд специального назначения «Омега» КГБ СССР) with the same tasks as the Kaskad teams. The name of the task force (the last letter in the Greek alphabet) indicated it to be the last unit of that sort to be deployed to Afghanistan. Omega was composed of 9 mobile special operations task groups (8 located in the interior of the country, the ninth group located together with the unit HQ in Kabul). This task group concluded the building of local Afghan capabilities within the Afghan Counter-Intelligence Service KAM and its Special Operations Tasks Battalion to take over the responsibilities of the KGB assets deployed on site.

== Formation ==
Vympel follows the lineage of Zenyth, Kaskad and Omega combined. On August 19, 1981 at a classified meeting the Soviet government made the decision for a permanent Special Operations Task Group within the KGB's First Chief Directorate. The new group was formed around the cadre of Zenith, Kaskad-1 and Kaskad-2 in order to retain the proficiency level of the operatives and to retain the lessons learned in the process of fighting irregular warfare in Afghanistan.

The founding commander of Vympel is Captain 1st Rank Ewald Kozlov, a graduate of the Baku Naval Officer School, with a service career in the Northern Fleet and the Caspian Flotilla. In 1968 he entered the Soviet Military Academy and the Military Diplomatic Academy (the training establishment of the GRU) after that, graduating in 1970. Right after that Kozlov transferred from the Soviet Armed Forces to the KGB, entering the First Chief Directorate's Department "S" (overseas illegal operatives). In 1972 he became an instructor at the KUOS. In 1979 he deployed with Zenyth to Afghanistan. Upon his return to the Soviet Union he headed the KUOS, a position vacated by the death of Col. Boyarinov in Operation Storm-333. Named Vympel's first commander, he was replaced in 1985 and promoted to the Headquarters of First Chief Directorate.

With its formation the Vympel Special Operations Task Group was put under the command of First Chief Directorate's Department "S" - the KGB's overseas clandestine service (Управление "С" (нелегальная разведка) ПГУ КГБ) under the covert name Independent Training Center (Отдельный учебный центр (ОУЦ)). The new unit's mission statement was ordered as follows:

- intelligence gathering deep within the enemy's rear (разведывательные действия в глубоком тылу противника)
- human intelligence (HUMINT) (агентурная работа)
- diversion and assault in strategic locations of the enemy (диверсии на стратегических объектах)
- seizure of enemy surface vessels and submarines (захват судов и подводных лодок)
- security of Soviet diplomatic locations overseas (охрана советских учреждений за рубежом)
- combat against terror organisations (борьба с террористическими организациями) and other tasks.

The unit was formed in 1981 by the KGB Maj. Gen. Yuri Ivanovich Drozdov within the First Chief Directorate of the KGB, as a dedicated spetsnaz unit specialised in deep penetration, sabotage, universal direct and covert action, protection of Soviet embassies and espionage cell activation in case of war. Most of the Vympel operatives mastered two or three foreign languages since they were intended to act in foreign countries, deep behind enemy lines. Vympel was tasked with assassinating the top leadership of enemy states and destroying strategic infrastructure in the critical "special period," when the outbreak of war between the superpowers would have been unavoidable.

Vympel quickly gained the reputation of being among the best Soviet special forces units, surpassing its GRU and MVD counterparts. However, after the collapse of the USSR, Vympel was decimated by endless re-organisation and re-definition. It passed under the aegis of the Security Ministry before being receded to the GUO (the two institutions were short-lived offspring of the ex-KGB during the Boris Yeltsin era) and finally passed to the MVD (Interior Ministry). However, the militsiya had no use for such a unit. The bulk of the Vympel operatives could not stand the humiliation of being subordinated to the police, and duly resigned: of 278 officers, only 57 chose to remain within the MVD. The unit was renamed "Vega."

In 1995, the FSB RF Special Operations Center (TsSN FSB RF) was granted control over Vympel. The group regained its original name and was reintegrated into the Intelligence Service structures. The emphasis shifted from covert and clandestine sabotage operations to counter-terrorism and nuclear safety enforcement. Vympel operatives undergo special training related to improvised or special explosive devices, permitting them to use "terrorist-like" tactics to carry out their operations. Physical training includes close hand combat, parachute training, diving, underwater combat techniques, climbing, and alpine rope techniques. Regional groups of Vympel were deployed in cities with especially important nuclear facilities.

Vympel, abbreviation of the Directorate в (Russian Cyrillic for V) of the TsSN FSB of the Russian Federation, is still a classified and secretive unit. It took part in Russia's Chechen campaigns and in storming of the Supreme Soviet building during the 1993 Russian constitutional crisis. Little is known about its current operations and activities, with the exception being the capture of the Chechen militant leader Salman Raduyev in March 2000 and the assault on the school in Beslan in September 2004.

Vadim Krasikov, who was named as a suspect in the murder of a Russian businessman in 2013 in Moscow and as 2022 convicted murderer of Zelimkhan Khangoshvili, is - according to investigations by Bellingcat - suggested a member or former member of Vympel.

== See also ==
- Alpha Group
