= FSB Special Purpose Center =

Special Purpose Center of the FSB of Russia
- Центр специального назначения ФСБ России (ЦСН ФСБ России)
- Active: 8 October 1998 - present
- Country: Russia
- Branch: FSB
- Size: Classified

Commanders
- Current commander: Major General Aleksandr Bondarenko

Special Purpose Center of the FSB of Russia (TsSN FSB of Russia) (Russian: Центр специального назначения ФСБ России, romanized: Tsentr spetsial'nogo naznacheniya FSB Rossii) is a special forces unit of the Federal Security Service of the Russian Federation, established on October 8, 1998. It is an independent structure within the FSB; the head of the Special Purpose Center reports directly to the First Deputy Director of the FSB.

The main task of the Special Purpose Center of the FSB of Russia is the fight against international terrorism on the territory of Russia and abroad, which includes activities to identify, prevent, suppress, disclose and investigate terrorist acts through the implementation of operational, combat and other measures (in accordance with Article 9.1 of Chapter II of Federal Law No. 40-FZ of April 3, 1995 “On the Federal Security Service”).

== History ==
The FSB Special Purpose Center was created on October 8, 1998, on the initiative of the Director of the FSB, Vladimir Putin, by uniting the special purpose units of the security agencies into a single team.

The decision to establish the Center was prompted by the growing threat of the spread of international terrorism and extremism. The creation of the Center allowed for the unification of the efforts of special units of security agencies in conducting special operations and combat operations to prevent acts of terrorism and providing forceful support for operational and investigative activities to counter organized criminal structures.

== Activities ==
According to data up to 2014, over the fifteen years of its existence, the employees of the Special Purpose Center of the FSB, independently or in cooperation with various units, have carried out numerous operational and combat operations, during which a significant amount of weapons, ammunition, explosives were seized, hundreds of hostages taken by militants were freed, active members of gangs were neutralized, among them such leaders as Salman Raduyev, Arbi Barayev, Aslan Maskhadov, Rappani Khalilov, Anzor Astemirov, emissaries of the international terrorist organization Al-Qaeda in the North Caucasus Abu Omar, Abu Hafs, Seif Islam and others.

According to media reports, officers from the Center are taking part in Russia's military operation in Syria. On February 1 2020, four special forces servicemen were killed in a landmine explosion.

Over the years of the FSB Special Purpose Center's activities, its employees have been awarded state awards more than two thousand times, and twenty servicemen have been awarded the highest degree of distinction—the title of "Hero of the Russian Federation" (eleven of them posthumously).

The unit, including the FSB special forces units Vympel and Alpha, are taking part in Russian invasion of Ukraine. The death of Lieutenant Colonel Nikolai Gorban of the FSB Special Operations Center and the death of Lieutenant Colonel Sergei Privalov of the FSB special forces are known.

According to the Novaya Gazeta Europe publication, in 2024, the Vympel and Alpha units were taking part in Kursk campaign.

== Structure ==
The FSB Special Purpose Center includes the following known special forces units:

- Directorate "A" (Alpha)
- Directorate "B" (Vympel)
- Directorate "K" (Kavkaz) (formerly the Yessentuki Special Purpose Service (SPS))
- Directorate "S" (Smerch)
- Directorate "T" (Tavrida) (formerly the 2nd SP Service of the FSB Special Purpose Center, Republic of Crimea, Simferopol, reorganized in January 2020)
- Directorate "D" (Donbass) (Formed on December 26, 2022) Operates in the territories of the Lugansk People's Republic, Donetsk People's Republic, Zaporizhzhia Oblast and Kherson Oblast.
- Special Weapons Combat Employment Service (SV) — testing new weapons in high-risk environments.

== Leadership ==
Heads of the Special Purpose Center of the FSB of Russia:

- Valery Grigorievich Andreev, Major General (October 8–21, 1998);
- Alexander Evgenyevich Tikhonov, Colonel General (October 22, 1998 – September 2022);
- Alexander Evgenyevich Bondarenko, Major General (September 2022 - present).

Deputy Heads of the Special Operations Center of the FSB of Russia:

- Sergeev, Alexey Viktorovich, Major General (1999—2017)
