= Operation Storm-333 =

1979 Soviet assassination of Afghan leader Hafizullah Amin

Coordinates: 34°27′17″N 69°06′48″E

- Part of Operation Baikal-79 and the Soviet–Afghan War
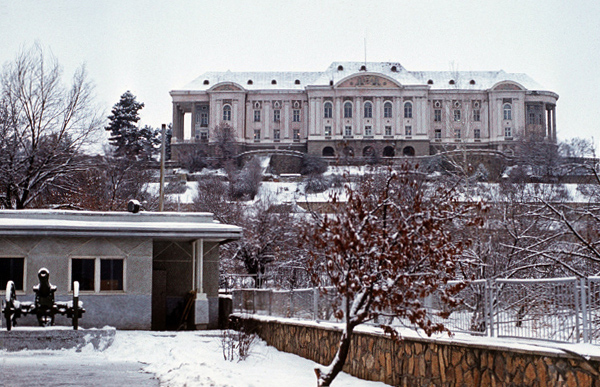
- The Tajbeg Palace, where the Soviet assault took place, photographed in 1987
Date	27 December 1979
Location	Kabul, Afghanistan
Result	Soviet victory; Assassination of Hafizullah Amin; Babrak Karmal installed as leader of Afghanistan; Beginning of the Soviet-Afghan War

Belligerents
Soviet Union; Supported by: Parcham	Afghanistan; Supported by: Khalq

Commanders and leaders
Yuri Drozdov; Viktor S. Paputin †; Grigoriy Boyarinov †; Viktor Karpukhin	Hafizullah Amin X Mohammed Yakub X

Units involved
Alpha Group; Zenit Group; 154th OSN GRU "Muslim Battalion"; 345th IG Airborne Regiment	21st Presidential Guard Regiment; Afghan Commando Forces detachments

Strength
660	2,200

Casualties and losses
Disputed: 40 casualties; Over 100 casualties according to Vasili Mitrokhin (KGB defector)	2,203 casualties

Operation Storm-333 (Russian: Шторм-333, Shtorm-333) was a military raid executed by the Soviet Union in Afghanistan on 27 December 1979. Special forces and airborne troops stormed the heavily fortified Tajbeg Palace in Kabul and assassinated Afghan leader Hafizullah Amin, a Khalqist of the People's Democratic Party of Afghanistan (PDPA) who had taken power in the Saur Revolution of April 1978. It was the start of the Soviet–Afghan War.

The assassination of Amin was part of a larger Soviet plan to secure and take control of Afghanistan with support from the PDPA's Parcham faction, which opposed the hardline ideology espoused by the rival Khalq faction; a number of Soviet troops crossed the Amu Darya and entered Afghanistan by land while others flew to airbases around the country with exiled Parchamis in preparation for the assassination. The Tajbeg Palace, located on a high and steep hill in Kabul, was surrounded by landmines and guarded by extraordinarily large contingents of the Afghan Army. Nonetheless, Afghan forces suffered major losses during the Soviet operation; 30 Afghan palace guards and over 300 army guards were killed while another 150 were captured. Two of Amin's sons, an 11-year-old and a 9-year-old, died from shrapnel wounds sustained during the clashes. In the aftermath of the operation, a total of 1,700 Afghan soldiers who surrendered to Soviet forces were taken prisoner, and the Soviets installed Babrak Karmal, the leader of the PDPA's Parcham faction, as Amin's successor.

Several other government buildings were seized from Amin's Khalqist government during the operation, including those for the Ministry of Interior Affairs, KAM, and the General Staff (Darul Aman Palace). Veterans of the Soviet Union's Alpha Group have stated that Operation Storm-333 was one of the most successful in the unit's history. Documents released following the dissolution of the Soviet Union in the 1990s revealed that the Soviet leadership believed Amin had secret contacts within the American embassy in Kabul and "was capable of reaching an agreement with the United States"; however, allegations of Amin colluding with the Americans have been widely discredited, with the Soviet archives revealing that the story of Amin as a CIA agent had been planted by the KGB.

== Background ==
The Democratic Republic of Afghanistan was initially led by Nur Muhammad Taraki, who was pro-Soviet Union, which resulted in cordial Afghan–Soviet relations. In September 1979, Taraki was deposed by Hafizullah Amin, due to intra-party strife. After this event and the suspicious death of Taraki (an apparent assassination by Amin's orders), Afghan–Soviet relations started to deteriorate. The KGB claimed that Amin was a "smooth-talking fascist who was secretly pro-western". By December the Soviet leadership had established an alliance with Babrak Karmal. The Soviet Union declared its plan to intervene in Afghanistan on 12 December 1979, and the Soviet leadership initiated Operation Storm-333 (the first phase of the intervention) on 27 December 1979.

== Soviet forces ==
Storm-333 was part of a bigger operation, Operation Baikal-79, aimed at taking control over approximately 20 key strongholds in and around Kabul, which included major military headquarters, communication centers and jails.

The core of Storm-333 assault team included 25 men from the Grom (Гром – "Thunder") unit of Alpha Group, and 30 operators from a special KGB group Zenit (Зенит – "Zenith"), later known as Vympel. There were also 87 troops of a company of the 345th Independent Guards Airborne Regiment. 520 men from the 154th Separate Spetsnaz Detachment of the USSR Ministry of Defence known as the "Muslim Battalion" because it consisted exclusively of soldiers from the southern republics of the USSR. This motorized rifle battalion had been formed in the USSR earlier in 1979 at the specific request of the Afghan leader to guard his residence as he could not rely on Afghan troops. These support troops were not issued armor or helmets, but one of them recalls that a magazine tucked inside his clothes protected him from an SMG bullet.

The teams were assisted by Sayed Mohammad Gulabzoy in leading it to Tajbeg Palace.

== Palace assault and death of Amin ==
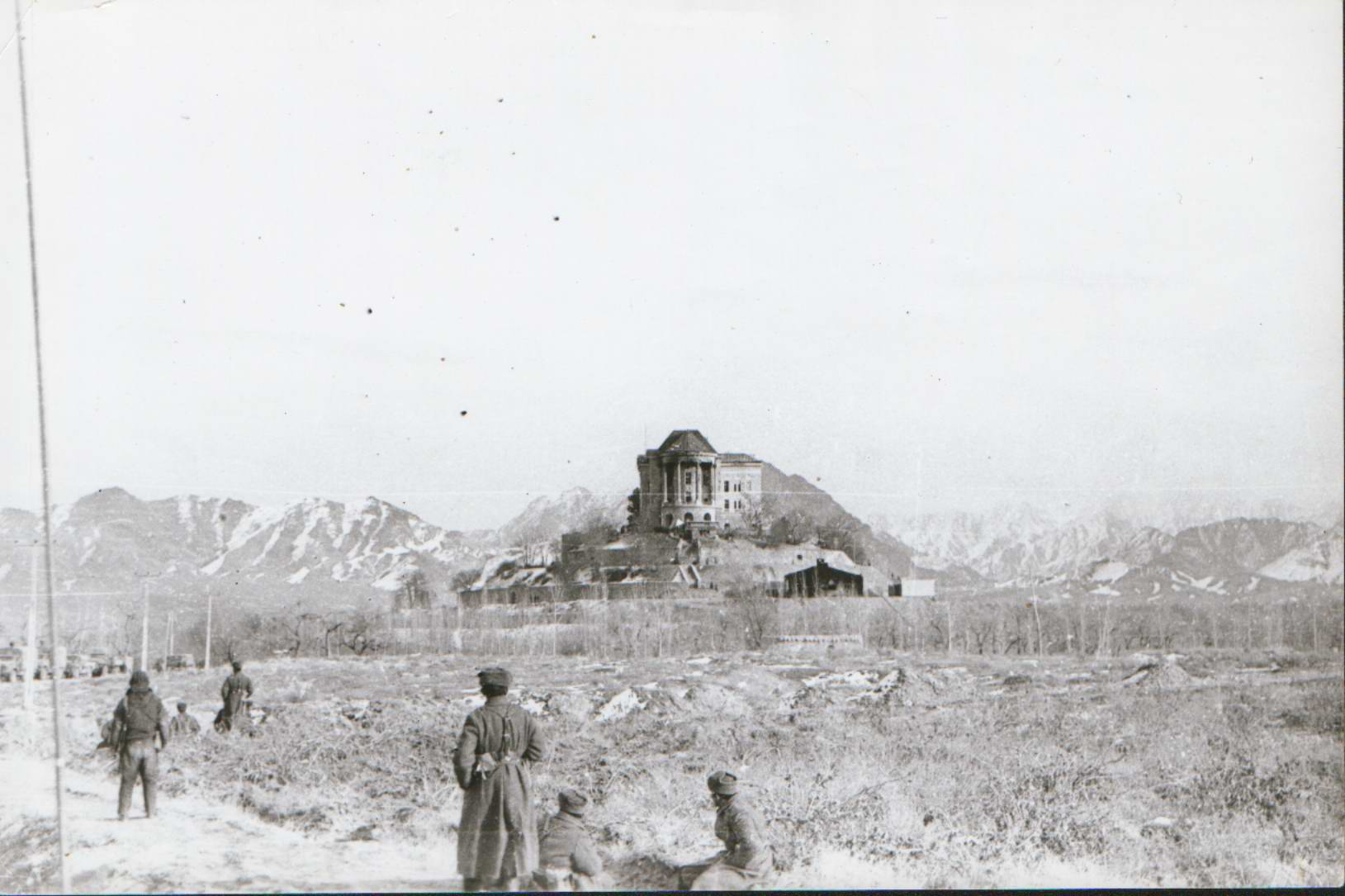
Photograph taken by a Soviet official of the Tajbeg Palace following the operation

The raid on the Tajbeg Palace, where General Secretary Amin was in residence with his family at the suggestion of his KGB security advisers, took place around 7 p.m. on 27 December 1979. The Tajbeg Palace was guarded by the Afghan Army.

During the attack, Amin still believed the Soviet Union was on his side, and told his adjutant, "The Soviets will help us." The adjutant replied that it was the Soviets who were attacking them; Amin initially replied that this was a lie. Only after he tried but failed to contact the Chief of the General Staff, he muttered, "I guessed it. It's all true." He was captured alive by Grom troops, but semi-conscious, suffering convulsions due to interrupted medical treatment related to a poisoning that occurred on 16 December of the same year. The exact details of his later death have never been confirmed by any eye witness. The official announcement of his death on Kabul Radio, as reported by the New York Times on 27 December 1979, was "Amin had been sentenced to death at a revolutionary trial for crimes against the state and that sentence had been carried out".

One story at the time was Amin was killed by Sayed Mohammad Gulabzoy, a previous Minister of Communication until ousted by Amin, who was present with two other previous ministers during the assault to give credence to accounts that it was an Afghan-controlled operation. Gulabzoy and Mohammad Aslam Watanjar, the previous Minister for Defense, later confirmed his death. This story of his death after a summary trial is supported by the fate of Amin supporters who were executed on the spot with a bullet in the back of the neck, after a 'Revolutionary Troika' arrested and sentenced them to death. Amin's two sons sustained shrapnel wounds during the clashes and died shortly after. Amin's wife and daughter were wounded, but survived. 347 other Afghans, including 30 of Amin's most personal guards from Palace and Leader's guards, also died in the fighting, and part of the palace went up in flames.

150 of the 180 Palace and Leader's guards, who were regular troops, surrendered when they realized the attacking troops were from the USSR, not from an Afghan unit. A total of 1,700 Afghan soldiers surrendered to Soviet troops and were taken prisoner. The whole operation took about 40 minutes. It was later determined in 2009 that Amin was mortally wounded by a fragment of a grenade that was thrown by Senior lieutenant Alexander Nikolaevich Plyusnin (1949–2022). The wife of the Minister of Foreign Affairs, Shah Wali (born 1939), was also killed in the operation.

== Soviet losses ==
During the assault on the Tajbeg five officers of the KGB special forces, seven troops from the "Muslim Battalion", and two paratroopers were killed. The commander of the KGB contingent, Col. Boyarinov, was killed. All the surviving participants in the KGB troops in the operation were wounded. Also, Soviet army doctor Colonel Viktor Kuznechenkov, who was treating General Secretary Amin, was killed by friendly fire in the palace and was posthumously awarded the Order of the Red Banner.

== Memoirs of the participants ==
According to Oleg Balashov, who was second in command of the assault group, the group was led by two elite units of Alpha and Vympel (15–20 each). The Alpha group targeted Amin, and the Vympel group had the task of collecting factual evidence that Amin was collaborating with the United States. Both groups were brought to Afghanistan secretly and blended with Muslim Battalions to make an impression that the operation was carried out by local units, whereas in reality nearly all work was done by Alpha and Vympel.

Before the operation, Balashov surveyed the area in the guise of a bodyguard of a Soviet diplomat. His unit knew that they were going to a death zone and felt uncomfortable about it – about 80% of them were wounded shortly after they left their vehicles, yet they continued the assault. As Balashov expected, Amin's troops targeted the first and last vehicle in the convoy of six. He placed his team of five men in the front BMP and, when the BMP was immobilized by fire from Amin's troops, ordered them to abandon the BMP and run to the palace. All five were quickly wounded by intensive fire from the guards, but were saved by bulletproof vests and helmets.

This account generally agrees with that of Aleksandr Lyakhovskiy, Soviet war historian and former director of the USSR Defense Ministry in Afghanistan, who gives more details and accentuates the ferocity and professionalism on both the attacking and defending sides.

== See also ==
- Operation Baikal-79
- Soviet–Afghan War

== Bibliography ==
- Braithwaite, Rodric (2011). Afgantsy: The Russians in Afghanistan 1979–89. Profile Books. ISBN 978-1-84668-062-5.
- Landsford, Tom (2017). Afghanistan at War: From the 18th-Century Durrani Dynasty to the 21st Century. ABC-CLIO. ISBN 9781598847598.
- Mitrokhin, Vasiliy (July 2002). "The KGB in Afghanistan" (PDF). Woodrow Wilson International Center for Scholars. Archived from the original (PDF) on 28 December 2017.
