= Viktor Karpukhin (Soviet Major general) =

Viktor Fyodorovich Karpukhin
- Born: 27 October 1947; Lutsk, Soviet Union
- Died: 24 March 2003 (aged 55) Orsha, Belarus
- Allegiance: Soviet Union
- Branch: KGB
- Service years: 1969–1992
- Rank: Major general
- Commands: Alpha Group
- Conflicts: Soviet–Afghan War; Operation Storm-333
- Awards: Hero of the Soviet Union

Viktor Fyodorovich Karpukhin (Russian: Виктор Фёдорович Карпухин; October 27, 1947 – March 24, 2003) was a member of the KGB who was instrumental in the Soviet–Afghan War.

He was born in the Ukrainian city of Lutsk. He joined the KGB's Alpha Group in 1967 and worked his way up to become its commander in 1988.

On December 23, 1979, Karpukhin led 38 soldiers of the Alpha Group into Afghanistan, who along with 500 Soviet paratroopers, landed at Bagram Airfield, next to the capital Kabul. Two days later, 40,000 Soviet Army soldiers poured over the Afghan border.

Stationed in the Soviet embassy in Kabul, which was close to the Tajbeg Palace of President Hafizullah Amin, Karpukhin's forces awaited further instructions. On December 27, Karpukhin was ordered to take the presidential palace. In the attack, two Soviet soldiers were killed, and Amin was shot to death. The following day, Prime Minister Babrak Karmal took Amin's seat as president. Karpukhin was awarded the Hero of the Soviet Union medal for his role.

Karpukhin retired from the Alpha Group in 1992 and worked in various government and commercial ventures.
