= Alpha Group =

Unit of the Soviet/Russian Security Service

Directorate "A" of the FSB Special Purpose Center
- Spetsgruppa "A"
- Alpha Group emblem
- Founded: 28 July 1974; 52 years ago
- Country: Soviet Union (1974–1991); Russia (1991–present)
- Branch: Spetsnaz of the KGB (1974–1991); Russia: GUO (1991–1993); MVD (1993–1995); TsSN FSB (1995–present)
- Type: Spetsnaz
- Size: Classified (estimated 500 in 1991, 250–300 in Russia in 2004)
- Part of: Federal Security Service Moscow (main force); Khabarovsk, Krasnodar, Yekaterinburg, Grozny (in Russia)
- Nicknames: Alpha Group, Alpha (Alfa)
- Motto: Победить и вернуться
- Engagements: Operation Storm-333; Aeroflot Flight 6833 hostage crisis January Events; Soviet coup d'état attempt Russia: Russian constitutional crisis Budyonnovsk hostage crisis Kizlyar-Pervomayskoye hostage crisis First Chechen War; Second Chechen War; Moscow theatre hostage crisis Beslan school hostage crisis Insurgency in the North Caucasus; Russian military intervention in the Syrian Civil War; Russian invasion of Ukraine

Commanders
- Current commander: Col. Valery Kanakin
- Notable commanders: Gen. Vitaly Bubenin; Gen. Viktor Karpukhin; Gen. Gennady Zaitsev

Spetsgruppa "A", also known as Alpha Group, officially Directorate "A" of FSB Special Purpose Center (Russian: Спецназ ФСБ "Альфа", romanized: Spetsnaz FSB "Alfa"), is a sub-unit of Russian special forces within the Russian Special Purpose Center of the Federal Security Service (FSB). It was created by the Soviet KGB in 1974. Although little is known about the exact nature of its primary directives, it is speculated that the unit is authorized to act under the direct control and sanction of Russia's top political leadership, similar to its sister unit, the Directorate "V" (Vympel), which is officially tasked with protecting Russia's strategic installations, as well as conducting black operations inside and outside Russia. It is also available for extended police duties, for paramilitary operations, and for covert operations, both domestically and internationally.

== In the Soviet Union ==
=== Creation and organization ===
On 28 July 1974, Alpha Group was created on the orders of the KGB Chairman, Yuri Andropov, in the aftermath of the 1972 Munich massacre. It might have been established as a response to West Germany's creation of the Grenzschutzgruppe 9 (or the GSG 9). By attaching a special-purpose unit to the office of the First Chief Directorate in Moscow (later the Seventh Directorate), it was hoped that the Soviet Union's defensive capacity against terrorist attacks would increase significantly. At the time, other, more offensive special forces of the KGB included the groups Zenit and Kaskad/Omega. Another important mission for Alpha was to provide security for the Soviet leadership against enemy special forces in times of crisis or war.

Later, territorial Alpha units were established across the Soviet Union:

- 7th Group formed in the Russian SSR, Khabarovsk Krai
- 10th Group formed the Ukrainian SSR, Kiev Oblast – Later forming the basis of Ukraine's Alpha Group
- 11th Group formed in the Belarusian SSR, Minsk Oblast – Later forming the basis of Belarus' Alpha Group
- 12th Group formed in the Kazakh SSR, Almaty Oblast – Later forming the basis of Kazakh NSC Arystan unit
- 13th Group formed in the Russian SSR, Krasnodar Krai
- 14th Group formed in the Russian SSR, Sverdlovsk Oblast

=== Operations ===
Initially, this special-purpose counter-terrorism unit was involved in delicate operations which necessitated its members have a unique skill set. In 1979, the Alpha Group shot a young Soviet Ukrainian, named Yuri Vlasenko, who was occupying a room in the Consular Section of the Embassy of the United States in Moscow, demanding he be granted asylum in the United States. He was either killed by gunfire, or by the detonation of his home-made bomb, which also slightly damaged the building. Throughout the 1980s, Alpha became increasingly deployed domestically to respond to a rising number of hostage taking situations, including at least two cases which involved buildings being taken over and hostages taken by violent groups of deserters from the Soviet Army, as well as other armed organizations.

Airline hijackings were another growing security concern within the Soviet Union which Alpha were deployed to solve. Between the 1970 Dymshits–Kuznetsov hijacking affair and 1986, sixteen incidents of air piracy had occurred on Aeroflot flights, six in 1978 alone. Notably, the 1983 hijacking of Aeroflot Flight 6833 in Tbilisi, Georgian Soviet Socialist Republic, was thwarted when Alpha stormed the airplane, killing three and capturing three other hijackers who were attempting to escape to the west, which also resulted in the loss of five hostages. Alpha members also participated in the storming of a Tu-134 during an attempted Tu-134 hijacking by deserters at Ufa International Airport on September 20, 1986. The two hijackers, having previously killed two policemen in a shootout, then killed two passengers while seizing the aircraft. Alpha operatives stormed the plane, killing one hijacker and wounding the other.

The unit also became involved in the ethnic conflicts throughout the Soviet Union in the late 1980s and early 1990s. Alpha was also used as the "spearhead" of KGB counterintelligence operations, interdicting hostile intelligence operations on Soviet territory and seizing enemy spies such as CIA agent Adolf Tolkachev in 1985. Two commanding officers of Group "A" were awarded the title Hero of the Soviet Union: Gen. Viktor Karpukhin and Gen. Gennady Zaitsev.

==== Foreign operations ====
Soon, Alpha was assigned missions far exceeding its formal scope. On 27 December 1979, Soviet leader Leonid Brezhnev launched a surprise armed intervention and regime change operation in the Democratic Republic of Afghanistan. Soviet forces, including KGB commandos who had infiltrated the country on a pretense to guard the Soviet Embassy, were able to quickly secure important government institutions throughout Kabul. Those institutions included: the Ministry of the Interior; the headquarters of the KHAD security service; the Ministry of Defense (Darul Aman Palace); and the Tajbeg Palace, in which, during a 34-minute storming, they successfully assassinated President Hafizullah Amin, along with his mistress and his young son (the orders were to kill every Afghan in the building). The assault on Tajbeg Palace was given the name Operation Storm-333 and involved a combined force of Soviet Airborne paratroopers (VDV), and special forces groups from the GRU and the KGB, including 24 men from the "Thunder" detachment of Alpha Group. The Alpha detachment were dressed in Afghan uniforms and headed by Grigoriy Boyarinov, commandant of the special operations school of the KGB's Department 8. It was Boyarinov who ordered that all Afghan witnesses of the operation be killed, and he was accidentally shot dead by Alpha troops when he was mistaken for a palace guard. According to Russian sources, the members of this highly trained group performed remarkably well, losing only two men; the lightest casualties of any of the forces involved in the raid. However, the success of Storm-333, and the initial invasion, marked the beginning of the ten-year Soviet–Afghan War, and subsequently, Alpha Group's extensive involvement throughout the conflict.

Six years later, in October 1985, Alpha Group was dispatched to war-torn Beirut, Lebanon. The Kremlin was informed of the kidnapping of four Soviet diplomats by the militant group, the Islamic Liberation Organization (a radical offshoot of the Muslim Brotherhood). It was believed that this was retaliation for the Soviet support of Syrian involvement in the Lebanese Civil War. However, by the time Alpha arrived, one of the hostages had already been killed. Through a network of supporting KGB operatives, members of the task-force identified each of the perpetrators involved in the crisis, and once identified, began to take the relatives of these militants as hostages. Following the standard Soviet policy of no negotiations with terrorists, one of the hostages taken by Alpha Group had his testicles removed and sent to the militants before being killed. The warning was clear: more would follow unless the remaining hostages were released immediately. The show of force worked; and, for a period of 20 years, no Soviet or Russian officials were taken captive, until the 2006 abduction and murder of four Russian embassy staff in Iraq. However, the veracity of this story has been brought into question. Another version says that the release of the Soviet hostages was the result of extensive diplomatic negotiations with the spiritual leader of Hezbollah, Grand Ayatollah Mohammad Hussein Fadlallah, who appealed to King Hussein of Jordan, and the leaders of Libya and Iran, to use their influence on the kidnappers.

=== Fall of the Soviet Union ===
==== Intervention in the Baltics ====
On 11 March 1990, the Supreme Council of the Lithuanian Soviet Socialist Republic made public their intent to secede from the Soviet Union and re-establish the independent Republic of Lithuania. As a result of this pronouncement, on 9 January 1991, the Soviet leadership dispatched Alpha Group to quell the independence movement and maintain Lithuania's status as a Soviet republic. This attempt to re-establish Soviet dominance culminated in the violent seizure of the Vilnius TV Tower on 13 January 1991, during which the Soviet forces killed 13 unarmed Lithuanian protesters, as well as one Alpha operative (Lt. Viktor Shatskikh, who was apparently struck in the back by friendly fire). In 2011, the former commander of Alpha Group, retired KGB Col. Mikhail Golovatov, was detained at Vienna International Airport on a European Arrest Warrant due to this incident, issued by Lithuania, but Austrian authorities released him within 24 hours, claiming that the information provided by Lithuania was "too vague". In response, the Lithuanian parliament discussed breaking diplomatic ties with Austria in protest. A joint statement by the Foreign Ministers of all three Baltic States condemned Golovatov's release, and said that it should have been one of "... the occasions when suspects are detained and extradited, particularly when they are accused of war crimes and crimes against humanity ..." as "... the crimes performed in 1991 in Vilnius and Riga have no limitation ..." ("Riga" referring to a similar crackdown in January 1991, when six Latvian policemen and civilians were killed by Soviet OMON and KGB forces, possibly including Alpha Group members).

==== 1991 Soviet coup d'état attempt ====
During the events of the Soviet coup attempt in August 1991, Alpha Group's commanding officer, Gen. Karpukhin, was commanded by KGB chairman Vladimir Kryuchkov to forcibly enter the White House, Russia's acting parliament, after paratroopers secured the entrance, to eliminate the President of the Russian SFSR, Boris Yeltsin, and various other anti-coup leaders assembled there. In addition to Alpha Group, Gen. Karpukhin was also given authority of Vega Group (Vympel), elements of the Soviet Airborne, Internal Troops, special units of the Dzerzhinsky Division (OMSDON), mobilized units of the Moscow OMON, three tank companies, and a squadron of helicopters. On-site analysis of the area was conducted by Airborne deputy commander Alexander Lebed, and other senior officers who mingled with the crowds of anti-coup protesters nearest to the White House. There was a general consensus among the military officials who gathered that day, as evidenced by their statements months after the botched coup attempt, that had they followed through on their endeavour it would have succeeded. The stated mission objectives could have been reached in no more than half-an-hour, but it would have come at a terrible human cost. Shortly after their assessment was made, Gen. Karpukhin and Vympel's Boris Beskov convinced the KGB Deputy chairman, Gennady Ageyev, that such a massive undertaking should be cancelled.

== In the Russian Federation ==
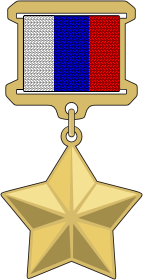
Hero of the Russian Federation medal

=== Decorated servicemen ===
As of 2018, nine officers of Alpha have been awarded the title Hero of the Russian Federation:

- Lt. Gennady Sergeyev (posthumously)
- Col. Anatoly Saveliev (posthumously)
- Maj. Vladimir Ulyanov (posthumously)
- Maj. Yuri Danilin (posthumously)
- Col. Sergei Dyachenko
- Col. Valery Kanakin
- Lt. Artyom Sevshencko
- Maj. Alexander Perov (posthumously)
- Col. Andrei Kum.

=== Shuffling and reforms ===
Alpha Group was severely downgraded during the dissolution and collapse of the Soviet Union. After the fall of the USSR, both Alpha and Vympel were transferred to the newly formed Main Guard Directorate (GUO), which was established on the basis of the KGB's Ninth Chief Directorate. In 1993, they were taken from GUO control, and for a time being put under the jurisdiction of the Ministry of Internal Affairs (MVD). As part of the government shakeup following the June 1995 Budyonnovsk hospital hostage crisis in which the Alpha Group had a leading role, Yeltsin fired the first Director of the Federal Security Service (FSB), Sergei Stepashin. Two months later, Alpha and Vityaz were both transferred from the MVD to the FSB. Simultaneously, Mikhail Barsukov became the new head of the organization, and created the FSB Anti-Terrorist Center (ATC), headed by Gen. Viktor Zorkin. Directorate "A" (Alpha) was tasked with protecting transportation and buildings while Directorate "V" (Vega/Vympel) was tasked with protecting strategic sites (another Directorate, "K", was tasked with ideological counterintelligence); "A" and "V" were soon joined in a Tsentr Spetsnaz under Gen. Vladimir Pronichev.

Meanwhile, Alpha veterans became active in legitimate businesses (such as the private security company Alpha-B co-founded by Col. Golovatov in August 1993) in organized crime, as well as in politics. The Alpha veterans' association, led by Sergey Goncharov, strongly opposed Russian President Yeltsin faction's party, Our Home – Russia, in the legislative election of 1995 (Goncharov later became a State Duma deputy). Gen. Karpukhin, who resigned from the service following the 1991 coup attempt, became chief of security to Kazakh President Nursultan Nazarbayev, after which he worked with private security companies in Moscow, and ran unsuccessfully for the Duma as a member of the Union of Patriots in 1995.

=== Operations ===
In October 1995, Alpha killed the armed man who hijacked a bus carrying South Korean tourists in Moscow. He had demanded $1 million and to be flown out of the country. In December 1997, Alpha freed the Swedish trade counsellor Jan-Olof Nyström who was kidnapped in Moscow by a gunman similarly demanding a ransom and a flight out of Russia. The hostage was swapped for Alpha's Colonel Anatoly Saveliev (Savelyev), and the hostage-taker was killed during the storming of the embassy. Colonel Savelyev was injured during the action, and died in hospital of a heart attack shortly thereafter.

==== 1993 Russian constitutional crisis ====
In 1993, during the Russian constitutional crisis, Yeltsin, who by then was President of the Russian Federation, used Alpha and Vympel during a deadly showdown in central Moscow against the pro-parliament forces that sided with Vice-President Alexander Rutskoy (declaring him an acting president). The pro-parliament faction had seized the Russian White House, along with several Supreme Soviet deputies who had been taken hostage. Yeltsin ordered Russian troops to storm the building, including elements of the paratroopers, the Alpha and Vympel Groups, Russian ground forces, and the Internal Troops's special forces unit, Vityaz. However, the Alpha troops initially refused to attack the White House, reportedly bringing their commander, Gen. Zaitsev, to the brink of suicide over the open insubordination of his troops in the face of a presidential order. When one of the Alpha troops, Lt. Sergeyev, who was near the White House, was mortally wounded by sniper fire from the nearby Hotel Ukraina, the unit finally agreed to move. Opposition gunmen were blamed for the shooting, but it is possible that the shots were actually fired by members of a special unit loyal to Yeltsin; it was rumored that the snipers in the hotel were commanded by Alexander Korzhakov, chief of the Presidential Security Service (SBP).

The crisis ended when Yeltsin's forces, paratroopers supported by tanks and armored personnel carriers, many of which were manned not by conscripts but members of the Union of Afghanistan Veterans, stormed and seized the White House on 4 October 1993, killing dozens, and possibly hundreds, of people, and ensuring the total victory of Yeltsin's faction. In the end, Rutskoy and the other leaders of anti-Yeltsin faction, including Ruslan Khasbulatov, Vladislav Achalov and Viktor Barannikov, all negotiated their surrender to the Alpha troops, who had entered the shelled and burning building after the shooting stopped, and brought them, along with the detained Supreme Soviet deputies, to Lefortovo Prison.

==== Conflicts in Chechnya and the North Caucasus ====
The Alpha Group was involved in the First Chechen War of 1994–1996, following the Chechens' declaration of independence from the Russian SFSR and then the Soviet Union in 1990–1991. In the fall of 1994, Alpha provided personal security details for the main commanders of the invasion of Chechnya, Defense Minister Pavel Grachev and federal Interior Minister Viktor Yerin, as they travelled to the Mozdok airbase in North Ossetia, which was the main headquarters, staging area and logistics base for Russian forces entering Chechnya.

Later, many Alpha troops served in "mobile anti-terror groups" (mobilnye gruppy antiterrora), as well as providing security for the pro-Moscow Chechen government complex and the regional FSB headquarters in the Chechen capital Grozny. In August 1996, when the city was retaken by Chechen separatist forces, 35 of them (including 14 members of the territorial Alpha unit from Krasnodar Krai) took part in a defence of the FSB headquarters. The separatist forces began to systematically retake individual buildings which were being defended by cut-off groups of Russian military and security forces. By the war's final ceasefire, the main FSB office was one of the few key structures still being held by federal forces in central Grozny, but at the cost of 70 of its defenders' lives in some of the fiercest fighting during the last battle.

Allegations arose, following the Khasavyurt Accord of August 1996, that the ATC carried out clandestine operations intended to discredit the Chechen Republic of Ichkeria, so that it would not receive international recognition of its independence. According to Jonathan Littell, the service "... was most likely deeply involved ..." in many of the high-profile kidnappings which damaged Chechnya's reputation. Littell wrote: "It is impossible to say whether these provocations were part of a more general FSB policy or whether the [ATC] and its departments were running their own show; certainly it did not reflect the official policy of the government, nor of those officials like Ivan Rybkin, the Secretary of the Security Council, tasked with the Chechen dossier between 1996 and 1999."

Alpha was active during the Second Chechen War that began in 1999, as well as the subsequent Insurgency in the North Caucasus. During the 2000 Battle of Komsomolskoye, Alpha snipers attached to Vladimir Shamanov's Western Group of federal forces, were deployed in an attempt to suppress Ruslan Gelayev's snipers in the village. According to the unit's veterans, operations in which Alpha took part led to the arrest of Chechen commander Salman Raduyev in 2000, the killing of Chechen commander Arbi Barayev in 2001, the killing of Chechen separatist President Aslan Maskhadov in 2005, and the killing of foreign militant leader Abu Hafs in Dagestan in 2006.

Following the transfer of responsibility for operations in Chechnya from the Ministry of Defence to the FSB in January 2001, and prior to the "Chechenization" policy that began in 2003, Alpha members (along with the other Russian personnel and pro-Moscow Chechen militia) participated in at least 10 mixed "combined special groups" (svodnye spetsialnye gruppy, SSGs), considered death squads by human rights groups and outside observers. It is believed that the SSGs were behind many of the numerous "name/address cleansings" (imeny/adressny zachistki): usually night-time raids by masked men in unmarked vehicles, targeting specific active or former rebel combatants, their supporters, their relatives, or other civilians for either forced disappearance or outright extrajudicial killing. In 2005, Human Rights Watch declared that the disappearances had reached the scale of a crime against humanity, and that "Russia has the inglorious distinction of being a world leader in enforced disappearances." Chechnya's UFSB also formed a local Alpha unit, believed to be similar in its role to the SSGs.

==== Mass hostage crises ====
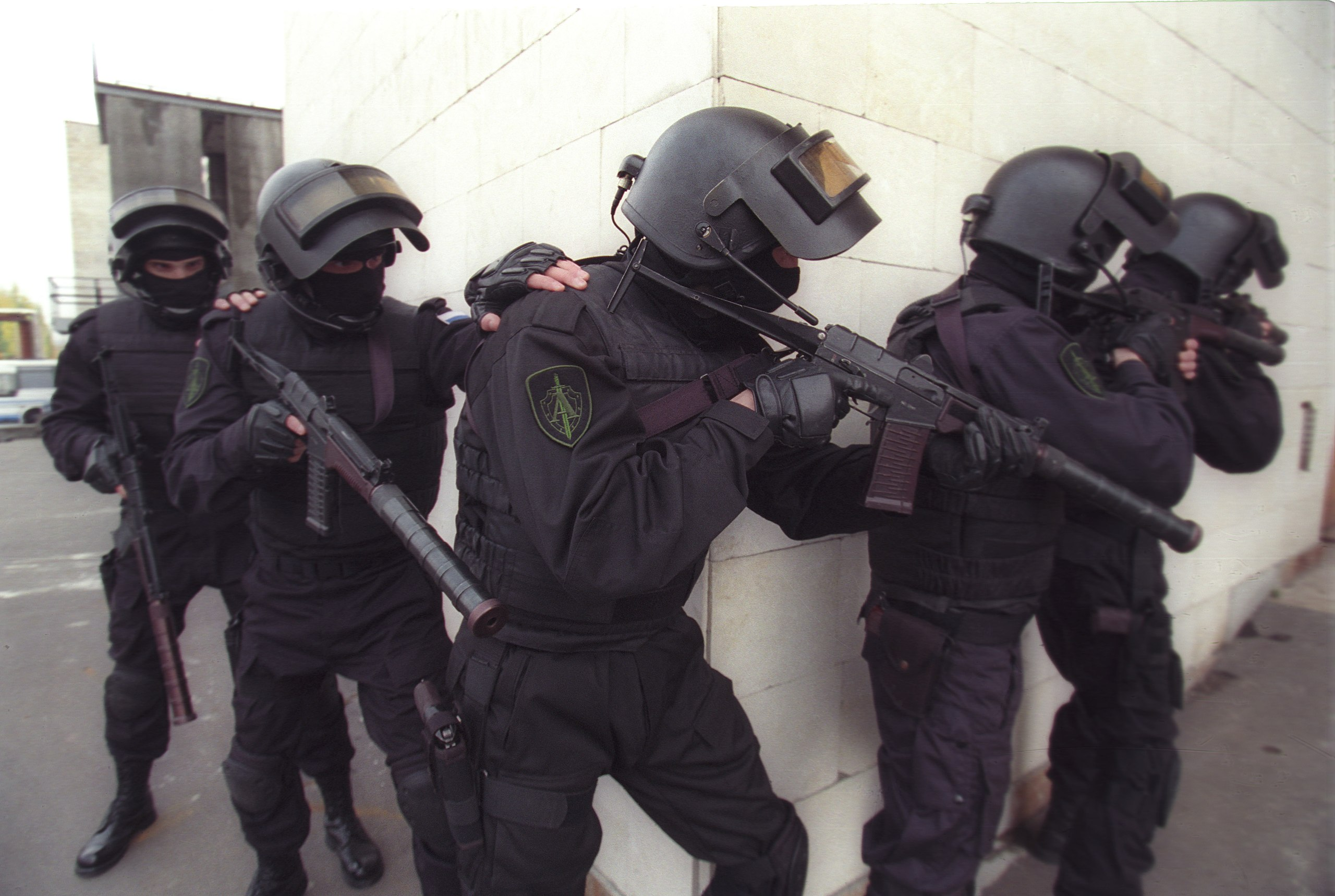
Alpha Group members during a training exercise in 2009

The group was instrumental in the Russian government's attempts to forcibly bring an end to a series of mass hostage crisis incidents, in which groups of Chechen and other separatist militants took hostages. These events took place in Russia's southern territories near Chechnya as well as in the Russian heartland, and were made up of the Budyonnovsk hospital hostage crisis in June 1995, the Kizlyar-Pervomayskoye hostage crisis in January 1996, the Moscow theatre hostage crisis in October 2002, and the Beslan school hostage crisis in September 2004. Each of these high-profile incidents resulted in hundreds of fatalities and injuries among the hostages and, with the exception of the Moscow siege, significant losses among the unit's personnel.

At Budyonnovsk (Budennovsk) in Stavropol Krai, two abortive storming attempts by Alpha and Vympel killed scores of hostages in a major public relations disaster for the Russian government, as the carnage was televised live across the country. In the first, a pre-dawn raid, only 86 out of more than 1,500 hostages were freed, but more than 30 hostages were killed before the rescuers were forced to retreat after four hours of fighting, which also resulted in the deaths of several men on both sides. After that, the leader of the hostage-takers, Chechen commander Shamil Basayev, agreed to release pregnant and nursing women, and to allow emergency services to put out a fire in the main building and to collect and remove dead bodies. The assault was then resumed at noon and included the use of tear gas; it stopped after over an hour later when Basayev agreed to release the remaining women and children. The overall death toll of more than 120 people included three Alpha members. In the end, the crisis was resolved through negotiations that led to an agreement involving a ceasefire in Chechnya and high-level peace talks, both of which later broke down, with full-scale hostilities resuming in October 1995. Russian Prime Minister Viktor Chernomyrdin claimed that both attacks had not been authorized by the government, but were launched by troops acting without orders.

At Pervomayskoye, a small settlement on the outskirt of Kizlyar in Dagestan, in an operation that was conducted under the direct control of Barsukov, Alpha Group was mostly held in reserve during multiple failed storming attempts spearheaded by Vityaz and the SOBR (a special forces unit of the Moscow police), supported by tanks and armored vehicles. Further attacks were conducted with heavy artillery, including Grad launchers firing salvos of rockets into the village, and helicopter gunship support. According to statements made to justify the use of unlimited force, the FSB had been informed, falsely, that the hostages had been executed by their captors, prior to the commencement of military operations.

This full-scale offensive continued for three days, until the Chechen militants fought their way through the siege lines in a night-time break-out, escaping with many of the surviving hostages in another major humiliation for the Kremlin. 26 out of the 150 hostages lost their lives (most of the original 2,000 hostages had been released in Kizlyar), and in all the incident resulted more than 300 fatalities, mostly among the Russian forces.

Although they avoided the kind of devastating losses that decimated the Moscow SOBR (including the death of their commanding officer) and the 22nd Independent Brigade of Spetsnaz GRU, Alpha Group still suffered casualties at Pervomayskoye. These included a friendly fire incident which occurred after fighting had ended, when a regular soldier accidentally fired his vehicle's Grom gun, killing two Alpha members. When the Alpha Group was deployed, they were sent in without winter clothing and quartered in unheated buses. One of the unit's commanders claimed they were "set up", saying: "The first day it was 15 below and we were standing in the fields with no warm clothes. There were no sleeping bags, no water, no food. The hostages were being destroyed, the rebels were being destroyed and we were being destroyed there. That's what happened."

Several highly controversial actions made the force susceptible to criticism revolving around the loss of life among the hostages. One of these actions was the use of an unknown chemical agent to assist Alpha Group and the SOBR break the October 2002 Moscow hostage crisis, by knocking out the people inside the building. The FSB chemical attack resulted in the deaths of at least 129 hostages and serious damage to the health of many others, yet was hailed by the group's officers as their "... first successful operation for years". In 2011, the European Court of Human Rights (ECHR) ordered Russia to pay compensation to 64 survivors of the siege for their physical and emotional suffering, and to prosecute the officials who committed the human rights violations, ruling that the authorities had failed to minimise the risks to the hostages. Russia failed to uphold the ECHR ruling, paying the compensation to victims but not launching an investigation into the violations.

Another controversy was the use of tank cannons, portable flamethrowers, and other weapons such as grenade launchers in Beslan, North Ossetia. On 3 September 2004, the local school was taken over by Chechen-led militants from Ingushetia, and was subsequently raided by the heavily armed FSB special forces of Alpha and Vympel. The operation was overseen by the head of the Special Purpose Center, Gen. Alexander Tikhonov, who forbade extinguishing the fire in the school, while the actual attack was personally led by Gen. Pronichev, and supported by tanks, armored personnel carriers and attack helicopters. John McAleese, a member of the Special Air Service (SAS) team which had liberated the Iranian Embassy in London in 1980, immediately called it one of the worst hostage rescue attempts he had seen or heard about.

The Beslan siege turned out to be particularly bloody, costing the lives of more than 333 people, including 186 children (age 1 to 17), 111 relatives, guests and friends, 17 school staff members and 10 Alpha members. No ballistic tests were carried out, and prosecutors were not allowed to examine the special forces' weapons to determine who exactly killed the hostages. In 2007, 447 survivors and relatives of victims of the Beslan massacre brought a complaint against the Russian government in seven applications to the ECHR.

== In other post-Soviet states ==
=== Ex-Soviet regional Alpha units ===
==== In Belarus ====
The Minsk territorial unit of Alpha continues to exist within the State Security Committee (KGB) of Belarus, known simply as "Alfa" («Альфа»).

==== In Kazakhstan ====
The Almaty territorial unit of Alpha was turned into the special unit Arystan (meaning "Lions" in Kazakh) of the National Security Committee (KNB) of Kazakhstan. In 2006, five members of Arystan were arrested and charged with the kidnapping of the opposition politician Altynbek Sarsenbayuly, his driver, and his bodyguard; the three victims were then allegedly delivered to the people who murdered them.

==== In Ukraine ====
Special Group "Alpha" is a branch of the Security Service of Ukraine; and a successor of the Soviet Union's Alpha Group. It has continued to be informally called "Alpha".

=== Self-styled new units ===
==== In Georgia ====
Georgia established its own Alpha unit in 1992. It was created as one of the three special forces units belonging to the Ministry of State Security, the other two being named Delta and Omega. In 1995, members of Alpha and the Minister of State Security, Igor Giorgadze, were blamed for the failed bombing attempt on the life of President Eduard Shevardnadze. After that, Giorgadze fled to Moscow, and Georgia's Alpha was purged and reorganized.

==== In Kyrgyzstan ====
A special unit named "Alfa" Special Operations Executive (ASOE) was established within the State Committee on National Security (GKNB) of Kyrgyzstan. In 2010, eight members of ASOE, including five snipers and the unit's commander, were charged with shooting and killing unarmed people during the Second Kyrgyz Revolution. Criminal cases were brought to the court under the articles: 97 (murder), and 305 part 2 (exceeding the limits of authority).

==== In Tajikistan ====
FSB Alpha (ФСБ Альфа) reversible armbands

== Equipment ==
Alpha Group operators have access to a wide array of small arms.

Assault rifles

- Various AK-74 variants
- AS Val
- AK-12
- AK-105
- M4A1 or AR-15 variants (Limited Use)
- AN-94 (Limited Use)
- HK-416

Light machine guns

- PKP Pecheneg
- PKM

Sniper and designated marksman rifles

- Various Dragunov variants
- H&K MR308 (civilian version of the HK417).
- Vintorez
- Accuracy International AWM
- Orsis T-5000
- Lobaev Arms M2 Urbana and M4 Dark Matter

Submachine guns and personal defense weapons

- Heckler & Koch MP5
- Vityaz-SN
- Brügger & Thomet MP9

Handguns

- Glock 19
- Glock 17
- Strizh
- MP-443
- Stechkin APS
- Makarov PM
- OTs-33 Pernach

== See also ==
- Vympel

== General sources ==
- Christopher Andrew and Vasili Mitrokhin (1999). The Sword and the Shield: The Mitrokhin Archive and the Secret History of the KGB. New York: Basic Books. pp. 389–391. ISBN 0-465-00310-9.
- Barry Davies (2005). The Spycraft Manual: The Insider's Guide to Espionage Techniques. Carlton Books Ltd. ISBN 1-84442-577-0.
- David Satter (2001). Age of Delirium: The Decline and Fall of the Soviet Union. New Haven, Conn: Yale University Press. ISBN 0-300-08705-5.
