= Mahkama =

Arabic term meaning 'court' or 'courthouse'

Mahkama (Arabic: مَحْكَمَة maḥkama) is the Arabic term for a court of law. It may refer to various types of courts, including civil courts, criminal courts, administrative courts, and Sharia courts.

The Arabic word has been adopted with adaptations in the wider Muslim world (see at Wiktionary), with derivatives in Persian, Turkic languages, Hindustani (Hindi and Urdu), Malay (including its Indonesian variant), etc. The spellings makhama and mahkamah also occur in English.

== Examples ==
- Mahkama Building (Jerusalem) or Tankiziyya, built in 1328–1330 during Mamluk rule, it housed various institutions: a madrasa (school), a school specialised in hadith studies, a Sufi khanaqah, and at the end of Ottoman rule and in the first years of British Mandate, a sharia court.
- Mahkamat al-Pasha or Mahkama du Pacha, administrative building raised in 1941–1942 in Casablanca, Morocco in a traditional Andalusian style. It was designed to contain the residence of the pasha, a reception hall, a courthouse, and a jail.

== See also ==
- Hākim (حاكم), meaning judge or ruler
- Mahakuma, term for subdivisions in India, deriving from the Arabic term
