= Podymalovo =

Podymalovo Подымалово
- Village
- Location within Bashkortostan Location within Russia
- Coordinates: 54°52′N 55°43′E
- Country: Russia
- Region: Bashkortostan
- District: Ufimsky District
- Time zone: UTC+5:00

Podymalovo (Russian: Подымалово) is a rural locality (a village) in Dmitriyevsky Selsoviet, Ufimsky District, Bashkortostan, Russia. The population was 1,601 as of 2010. There are 35 streets.

== Geography ==
Podymalovo is located 24 km northwest of Ufa (the district's administrative centre) by road. Chernolesovsky is the nearest rural locality.
