= Yuri Drozdov (general) =

Soviet KGB agent (1925–2017)

Yuri Ivanovich Drozdov
- Юрий Иванович Дроздов
- Drozdov in the 1970s
- Born: 19 September 1925; Minsk, Byelorussian SSR, Soviet Union (now Belarus)
- Died: 21 June 2017 (aged 91); Moscow, Russia
- Burial place: Troyekurovskoye Cemetery, Moscow
- Education: Mikhailovskaya Military Artillery Academy
- Spouse: Lyudmila Yudenich (after 1943)
- Children: 2
- Military career
- Allegiance: Soviet Union
- Branch: Red Army (1943–1956); KGB (1956–1991)
- Service years: 1943–1991
- Rank: Major-General
- Known for: Overseeing the "Illegals Program" during the Cold War
- Conflicts: World War II; Eastern Front; Vistula-Oder Offensive; Battle of Berlin; Soviet–Afghan War; Operation Storm-333
- Awards: Order of Lenin (1981)

Yuri Ivanovich Drozdov (Russian: Юрий Иванович Дроздов; 19 September 1925 – 21 June 2017) was a Soviet security official. In 1979, he led Operation Storm-333, formally triggering the Soviet–Afghan War. Later, as a high-level agent of the KGB, he oversaw the execution of the "Illegals Program" in the United States from 1979 until 1991. Drozdov was a recipient of the Order of Lenin, which was conferred to him in 1981.

== Early life ==
Yuri Ivanovich was born in Minsk to the former Anastasia Kuzminichna Pankevich (1898-1987) from Lepel, Belarus, and Ivan Dmitrievich Drozdov (1894-1978).

His mother, Anastasia Kuzminichna, was a Belarusian typist with the English paper factory in Pereslavl-Zalessky, and then, after the Russian Civil War, in the secretariat of the then NKVD of Byelorussia. Her father, Kuzma Pankevich, fought as a partisan during the Great Patriotic War falling ill and dying at over 90 years old in 1943 near his home next to the Lepel Cemetery where he had been a guard since the Revolution.

His father, Ivan Dmitrievich, was a professional Czarist army artillery officer that fought on the Southwestern Front receiving the Cross of St. George for bravery after receiving an Austrian bayonet to the chest during the Great War and, after the Russian Revolution, became a Bolshevist with the Red Guards militia as the artillery commander of Chapayev's famed division during the Russian Civil War. He met Anastasia while he was in Mikhail Tukhachevsky's Red Army campaign on Warsaw during the Polish–Soviet War. Between the establishment of the Soviet Union and the Great Patriotic War, they lived in various places in Byelorussia, Ukraine, and Russia including Minsk and Kharkiv. Conscripted into the Red Army on 17 December 1942, from Yerakhtur or Erakhtur (Russian: Ерахтур) in the Ryazan Oblast (Russian: Ерахтурский РВК, Рязанская обл., Ерахтурский р-н), Ivan Dmitrievich fought with distinction during the Great Patriotic War in the victorious 5th Red Army on the 3rd Belorussian Front receiving the Medal "For Valor" (Russian: Медаль «За отвагу») for actions taken on 2 March 1945, to capture the Wehrmacht's center of defenses by destroying three German submachine gunners with grenades. He spent one and a half years recovering from a bullet wound to his lungs. Later, he became the chief of staff of the military department at the Kazan University. He and his wife spent their final years in Kazan where he first started his military career.

== Career ==
In 1940, Yuri Ivanovich began his military training at the 14th Special Artillery School in Kharkiv where his father had been on the faculty since 1937. When the war began, he evacuated to Aktyubinsk to work at a tank repair plant. He was only 17 when he graduated from school in June 1943 and entered the Red Army in July 1943 for military training at the Red Army Military Technical Academy (the Leningrad Artillery School known today as Mikhailovskaya Military Artillery Academy (Russian: Михайловская военная артиллерийская академия). During the Great Patriotic War, he was a Lieutenant on the 1st Belorussian Front and commanded a fire platoon of an anti-tank battalion under the command of famed Nestor Kozin in the 52nd Guards Rifle Division which victoriously entered Berlin in the spring of 1945. He served with distinction receiving the Order of the Red Star (Russian: Орден Красной Звезды). Following the War, he continued his service with the Red Army and later the Soviet Army in Germany and the Baltics. In 1952, Drozdov began his studies of German and English at the Soviet Army's Military Institute of Foreign Languages in Moscow and then, in 1956, graduated as a German and English linguist and transferred to the KGB.

In the spring of 1957 until August, he began his illegals career posing as a Silesian in Leipzig and then transferred to Berlin where he, under Aleksandr Mikhaylovich Korotkov, the KGB commander in the GDR, was a KGB liaison officer to the Stasi, living in West Berlin to increase his fluency and become more convincing in his alias. He had several roles as an illegal including the violent SS man Baron Hoenshtein, who received valuable intelligence information from his connections, and then as Inspector Kleinert, who obtained cover documents for other Soviet illegals. This was merely the beginning of the most illustrious person in the history of the KGB's First Chief Directorate.

On Glienicke Bridge between Potsdam and Berlin during the 10 February 1962, prisoner exchange of Francis Gary Powers, who had been shot down during the 1960 U-2 incident, and KGB Colonel Vilyam Genrikhovich "Willie" Fisher (alias Rudolf Abel), who had been convicted of espionage activities against the West during the Hollow Nickel Case, Drozdov (alias Jurgen Drews, Abel's purported German cousin) facilitated the transfer with Abel's attorney, James B. Donovan. The classic 1968 Soviet film, The Shield and the Sword depicting the prisoner exchange, inspired Russian President Vladimir Putin to join the KGB.

In 1963, he returned to Moscow for graduate studies. In 1964-1968 during the Cultural Revolution, he served as the KGB resident in Communist China which also was a time of increased Sino-Soviet tensions. In New York in 1975–1979, he became the Soviet Union's deputy representative to the United Nations as the KGB resident.

Paving the way for the Soviet invasion of Afghanistan in 1979 as the new KGB Chief of Directorate S, (Note: Directorate S is the illegals section of the KGB. Previously from 1974 to 1979, Vadim Kirpichenko headed Directorate S.) he led the 43 minute Special Operation Storm-333 (Note: Storm-333 was part of the much larger Soviet Invasion of Afghanistan code named Operation Baikal-79 which began at 3pm on 25 December 1979. The Soviet leadership intended to stop the CIA from establishing a new Great Ottoman Empire with the Soviet Union's central Asian republics, secure this southern Soviet region, which lacked proper air defenses, from possible Pershing-type missile attacks, prevent Pakistan and Iran from gaining Afghan uranium deposits, stop the CIA's support of the Basmachi movement, and to prevent the United States from gaining the precious resources of Tajikistan and the Pamirs.) beginning at 7:30pm on Friday, 27 December 1979, in which KGB forces stormed the Afghan presidential palace replacing President Hafizullah Amin with their own puppet Babrak Karmal. This action was the beginning phase of the Soviet Union's protracted Soviet Union-Afghanistan War (1979-1989). He led the Directorate S until 1991 establishing Vympel within the KGB's First Chief Directorate as a dedicated spetsnaz unit that specialized in deep penetration, sabotage, universal direct and covert action, protection of Soviet embassies and espionage cell activation in case of war.

After his resignation from the KGB, he worked for his company, Namakon (Namacon in the West), to provide security and logistics to foreign businessmen, political analysis, and finding office space and performing background checks for Western businesses in Russia.

== Personal life ==
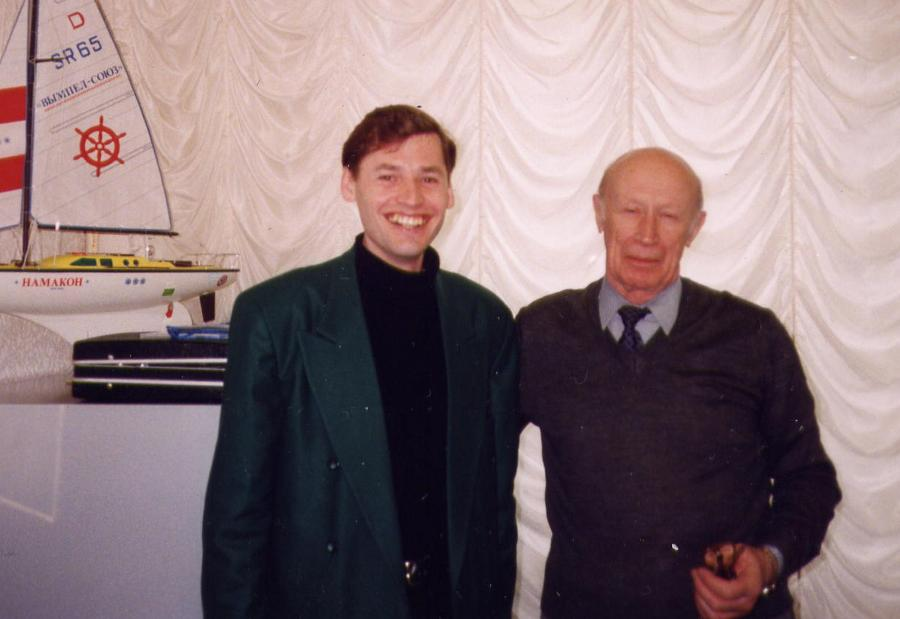
Drozdov in 1998

Drozdov met his wife, the former Lyudmila Yudenich, during World War II. He was a member of the Russian Orthodox Church and owned an icon of Tsar Nicholas II, acquired at some point following the Fall of Communism. He died in Moscow on 21 June 2017 and was buried with military honors at the Troyekurovskoye Cemetery.

== Awards and decorations ==
Soviet Union and Russia

Order of Lenin (1981)
Order of the October Revolution (1980)
Order of the Red Banner (1978)
Order of the Patriotic War, 1st class (1985)
Medal of Zhukov
Order of the Red Banner of Labour (1966)
Medal "For Labour Valour" (1959)
Medal "For Battle Merit"
Order of the Red Star (1945)
Medal "For the Liberation of Warsaw" (1945)
Medal "For the Capture of Berlin" (1945)
Medal "For the Victory over Germany in the Great Patriotic War 1941–1945" (1945)
Medal "For Strengthening of Brotherhood in Arms"
Medal "For Impeccable Service", 1st class
Medal "For Impeccable Service", 2nd class
Badge "Internationalist Warrior"

- Honorary State Security Officer
- jubilee medals

Foreign

Order of the Red Banner (Afghanistan)
Medal "From a grateful Afghan people" (Afghanistan)
Medal "For Strengthening Friendship in Arms", Golden class (Czechoslovakia)
Brotherhood in Arms Medal, Gold (East Germany)
Order of the Red Banner of Labor (Mongolia)
Order of Friendship (Mongolia)
Medal "50 Years of the Mongolian People's Army" (Mongolia)
Medal "40 Year Anniversary of the Battle of Khalkhin Gol" (Mongolia)
Medal "For Warsaw 1939-1945" (Poland)

- government awards of Cuba

== Books he authored ==
- Yuri Drozdov (2016). No Fiction: Notes of the Chief of Illegal Intelligence.
- Fartishev, Vasily, and Drozdov, Yuri. Юрий Андропов и Владимир Путин. На пути к возрождению in Russian. translated title: Yuri Andropov and Vladimir Putin: on the path for revitalizing. Moscow. Olma Press. 2001. 352 pages. ISBN 5-224-01933-8.
