= Balyshly =

Balyshly Балышлы
- Selo
- Location within Bashkortostan Location within Russia
- Coordinates: 54°32′N 55°01′E
- Country: Russia
- Region: Bashkortostan
- District: Blagovarsky District
- Time zone: UTC+5:00

Balyshly (Russian: Балышлы; Bashkir: Болошло, Boloşlo) is a rural locality (a selo) and the administrative centre of Balyshlinsky Selsoviet, Blagovarsky District, Bashkortostan, Russia. The population was 542 as of 2010. There are 7 streets.

== Geography ==
Balyshly is located 22 km south of Yazykovo (the district's administrative centre) by road. Novy Bulyak is the nearest rural locality.
