= Vitaly Bubenin =

Soviet military general (born 1939)

Vitaly Dmitrievich Bubenin
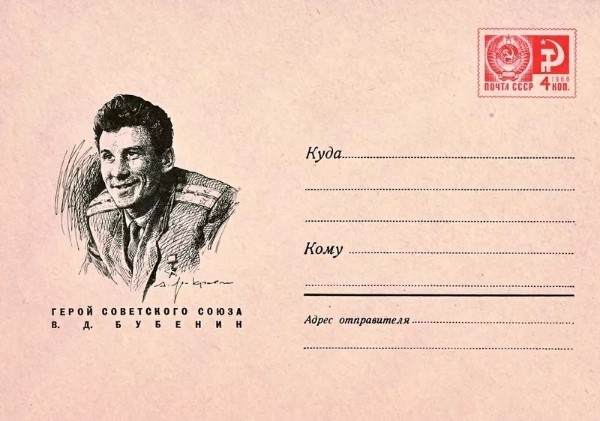
- Portrait of Bubenin in a 1969 Soviet postal cover
- Born: 11 July 1939 (age 87); Nikolayevsk-on-Amur, Khabarovsk Krai, Russian SFSR, Soviet Union
- Military career
- Allegiance: Soviet Union; Russia
- Branch: Soviet Border Troops (1961–1991); Border Service of Russia (1991–1995)
- Service years: 1961–1995
- Rank: Major General
- Conflicts: Sino-Soviet border conflict; Soviet–Afghan War
- Awards: Hero of the Soviet Union
- Other work: Politician

Vitaly Dmitrievich Bubenin (Russian: Вита́лий Дми́триевич Бубе́нин; born 11 July 1939) was a Soviet Border Troops major general and recipient of the title Hero of the Soviet Union.

== Early life ==
Bubenin was born on 1939 in Nikolayevsk-on-Amur. He graduated from 10 classes in 1957 and studied at the Khabarovsk Technical School No. 2. He later worked as a mechanic for the repair of industrial equipment at JSC "Dalenergomash" plant in Khabarovsk.

== Military career ==
He joined the Soviet Border Troops in 1961 and graduated from Alma-Ata Higher Command Border School in Kazakh SSR.

From 1966, he was deputy head of the Nizhne-Mikhailovka outpost in the 57th Ussuri Border Detachment of the Pacific Border District in the Soviet Far East. On 1967, he was appointed as head of the frontier post in Sopki Kulebyakiny, Primorsky Krai. Bubenin became a member of the CPSU in 1968.

=== Sino-Soviet Border Conflict ===
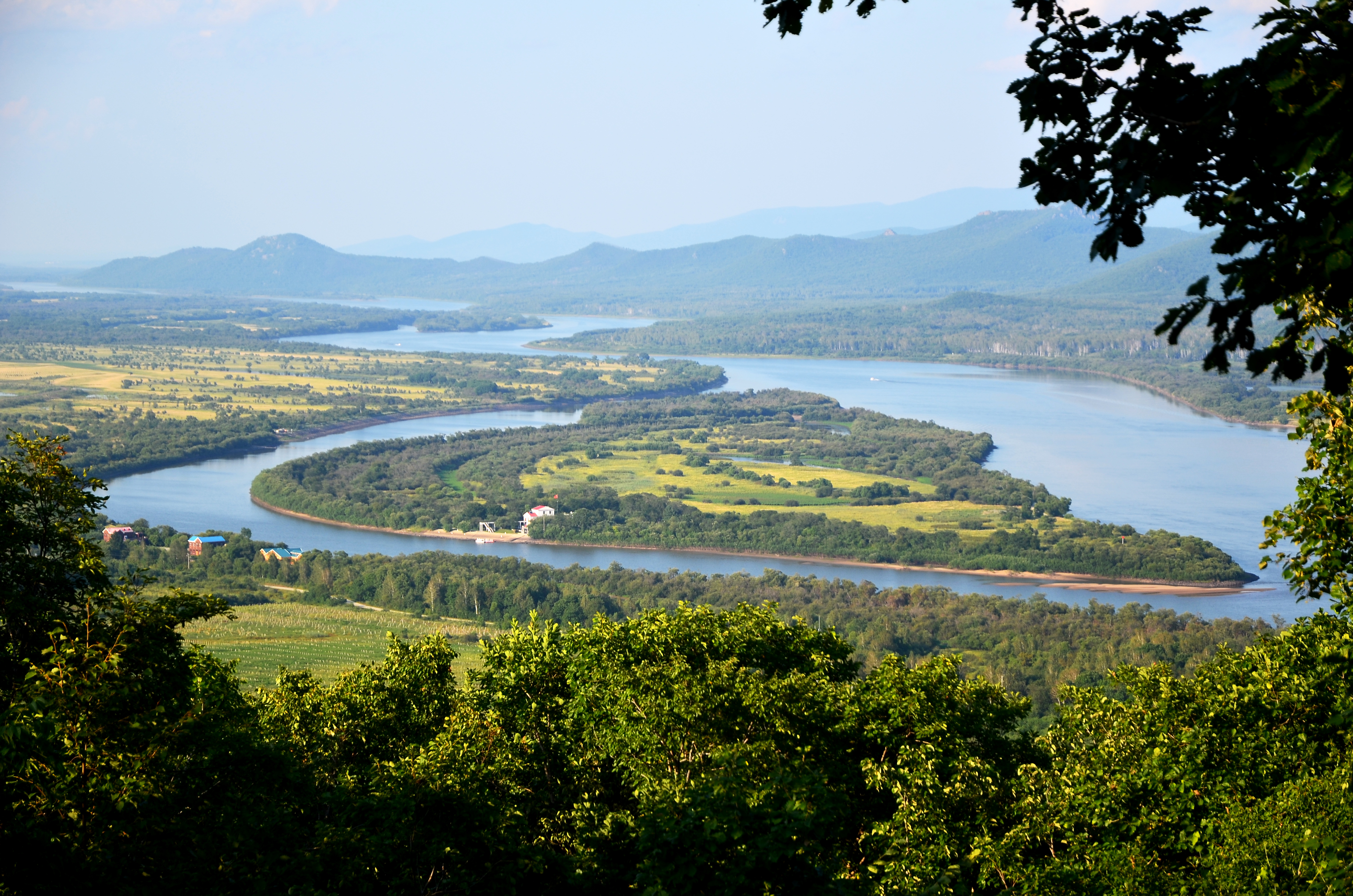
Zhenbao Island

In March 1969, hosilities between China and Soviet Union erupted at the vicinity of Damansky Island on the Ussuri (Wusuli) River, near Manchuria. As the head of the 1st Border Outpost of the 57th Imansky border detachment of the Pacific Border District, Bubenin came to the aid of the soldiers at a neighboring outpost and went into battle against People's Liberation Army troops despite being wounded and shell-shocked.

On 1 March, during the shelling of the positions of border guards by machine guns, grenade launchers and mortars by PLA troops, Bubenin was shell-shocked by a close rupture of a mortar mine, but managed to get to an armored personnel carrier and used it to counterattack Chinese forces from the north. During the counterattack, he fired at the enemy from a heavy machine gun and decided to withdraw from the battle after all the cartridges were used up. During the retreat, the armored personnel carrier was damaged by enemy fire and Bubenin was wounded in the legs by a mine fragment. Despite being injured for a second time, he did not leave the battlefield. During the next counterattack using another armored personnel carrier, he was wounded for the third time.

By the decree of the Presidium of the Supreme Soviet of the USSR of 21 March 1969, for the courage shown, the skillful conduct of the operation to protect the state border, Bubenin was awarded the title of Hero of the Soviet Union with the Order of Lenin and the Gold Star medal.

=== Post-conflict ===
After treatment in the hospital, he entered the Lenin Military-Political Academy, where he graduated in 1973. After graduation, he served in Vyborg and then in the Arctic as deputy head of the political department of the 100th Nikel Border Detachment of North Western Border District.

On 5 September 1974, by personal order of KGB Chairman Yuri Andropov, Bubenin was appointed commander of Alpha Group. On 29 April 1977, at his own request, he returned to the border troops, and was appointed head of the political department of 60th Vilna-Kuril Border Detachment.

Bubenin was appointed deputy head of the political department of the Kamchatka Border District on 1979. From 1981 to 1983, he served as deputy chief of the operational-troop department of the troops of the Central Asian Border District and took part in the Soviet-Afghan War.

From 1983 to 1985, he studied at the Academy of Social Sciences under the Central Committee of the CPSU. On 1985, he was appointed as head of the second department in the Political Directorate of the Main Directorate of the Border Troops of the KGB. From 1987 to 1989, Bubenin served as deputy head of the district, head of the political department and member of the Military Council of the Baltic Border District.

From 1989 to 1993, he served as deputy commander of the North Eastern and Far Eastern Border Districts.

In 1993, by decree of the President of the Russian Federation, he was appointed to the Khabarovsk Border Institute of the Border Service of the Federal Security Service of the Russian Federation, a position he served from 1993 to 1995.

In 1995, he retired at the rank of major general.

== Later life ==
Following retirement from military service, he served as deputy in the Legislative Duma of Khabarovsk Krai from 1994 to 1997.

As of February 2015, he resides in the city of Sochi in Krasnodar Krai.

== Awards and honors ==
Hero of the Soviet Union (21 March 1969)
Order of Lenin (21 March 1969)
Order of Honour
Order of the Red Banner (24 August 1983)
Order "For Service to the Homeland in the Armed Forces of the USSR", 3rd class (30 April 1975)
Medal "For Distinction in Guarding the State Border of the USSR"
Jubilee Medal "Twenty Years of Victory in the Great Patriotic War 1941–1945" (1965)
Medal "Veteran of the Armed Forces of the USSR"
Medal "For Strengthening of Brotherhood in Arms"
Jubilee Medal "50 Years of the Armed Forces of the USSR" (1967)
Jubilee Medal "60 Years of the Armed Forces of the USSR" (1978)
Jubilee Medal "70 Years of the Armed Forces of the USSR" (1988)
Medal "For Impeccable Service", 1st class
Medal "For Impeccable Service", 2nd class
Medal "For Impeccable Service", 3rd class
