= Tajbeg Palace =

Palace in Kabul, Afghanistan

Coordinates: 34°27′17.38″N 69°6′48.04″E

- قصر تاج بيگ - د تاج بېګ ماڼۍ
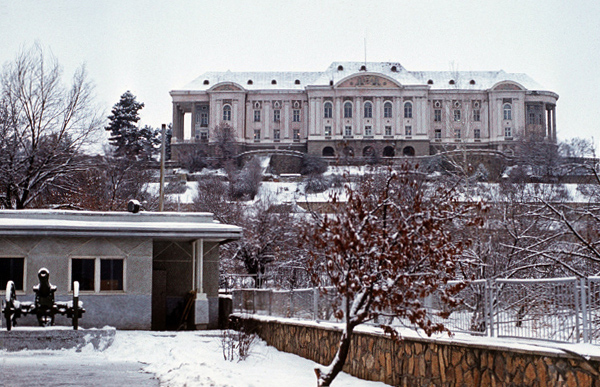
- Tajbeg Palace in 1987
- Interactive map of the Tajbeg Palace area

General information
- Type: Palace
- Architectural style: Neoclassical
- Location: Kabul, Afghanistan
- Renovated: 2021

Technical details
- Floor count: 3

Tajbeg Palace (Pashto: د تاج بېګ ماڼۍ; Dari: قصر تاج بيگ; Palace of the Large Crown), also called the Queen's Palace, during the rule of the Kingdom of Afghanistan is one of the palaces in the popular Darulaman area of Kabul, Afghanistan. The stately mansion is located about 16 km (9.9 mi) southwest from the city's center. It sits on top of a knoll among foothills where the Afghan royal family of the day, known as the Mohammadzai dynasty, once hunted and picnicked.

Originally built in the 1920s to house the then royal family, Tajbeg Palace is one of the most impressive landmarks of Darulaman, a district created during the era of Amanullah Khan by a team of European architects in an attempt to modernize Afghanistan. The palace once served as the residence of General Secretary Hafizullah Amin. It was damaged during the civil war in the 1990s but recently renovated.

== History ==
Not far from Tapa-e Taj Beg (hill of Taj Beg), a palace for the Queen of the Timurids is said to have been found a long time ago. Terraced garden designs were preferred by Timurids and Mughals, and today some ruins remain. The Timurids and their successors, the Mughals, have kinship relations with the Pashtun tribes of Durrani and later Yusufzai. The daughter-in-law of Ahmad Shah Durrani (the wife of Timur Shah Durrani) was the daughter of Alamgir II.

According to some historians, the palace seems to have been renovated by Zaman Shah Durrani in 1795 (1210 AH), which was subsequently destroyed in military conflicts, and the ruins from ancient times remain. Some members of the International Security Assistance Force have documented ruins of the former castle.

The current palace was constructed in the 1920s to house the Afghan royal family. The Swedish memoir writer Aurora Nilsson (also known as Rora Asim Khan), who lived in Afghanistan with her Afghan husband in 1926–27, describes in her memoirs how she was invited to the palace by Queen Soraya to describe Western lifestyle and customs to the Queen and the King's mother.

On December 27, 1979, the Soviet Union launched its intervention in Afghanistan. That evening, the Soviet military launched Operation Storm-333, in which some 700 troops, including 54 KGB spetsnaz special forces troops from the Alpha Group and Zenith Group, stormed the Palace and killed PDPA general secretary Hafizullah Amin, who had resided there since December 20.

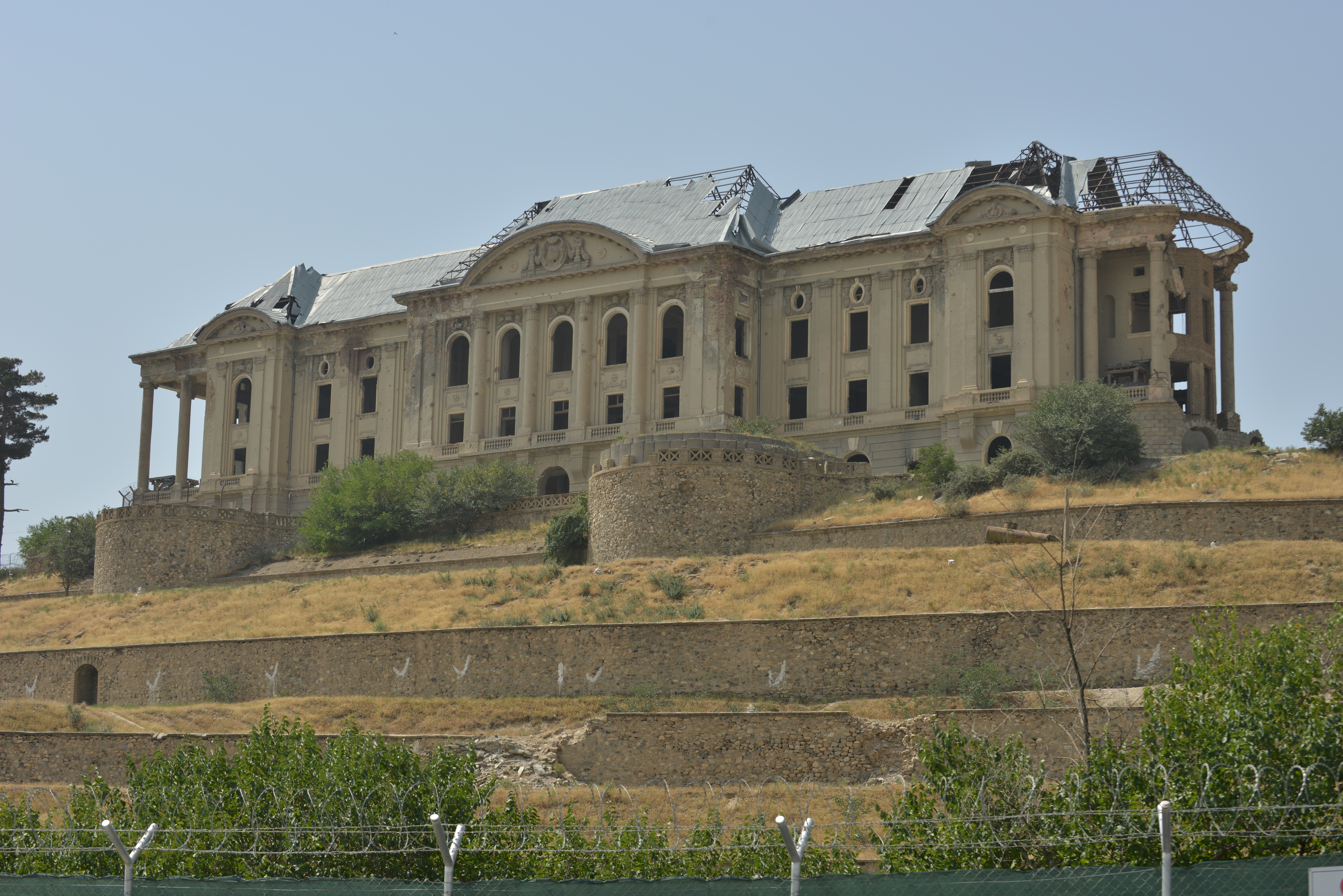
Tajbeg Palace in 2012

During the Soviet–Afghan War it served as the headquarters of the Soviet 40th Army. The palace was severely damaged in the years after the Soviet withdrawal from Afghanistan, when different Afghan mujahideen factions fought for control of Kabul after the fall of Mohammad Najibullah's government in 1992.

The Islamic Republic of Afghanistan, in conjunction with the German government, drafted plans for renovating the palace for official use, requiring funds from private donations from wealthy Afghans. These plans were on indefinite hold as the Afghan government sought to establish peace and stability. A similar plan was approved for the nearby Darul Aman Palace which was completely renovated and opened to the public on Afghan Independence Day, August 2019. In 2021, the palace had been completely rebuilt.

== Gallery ==
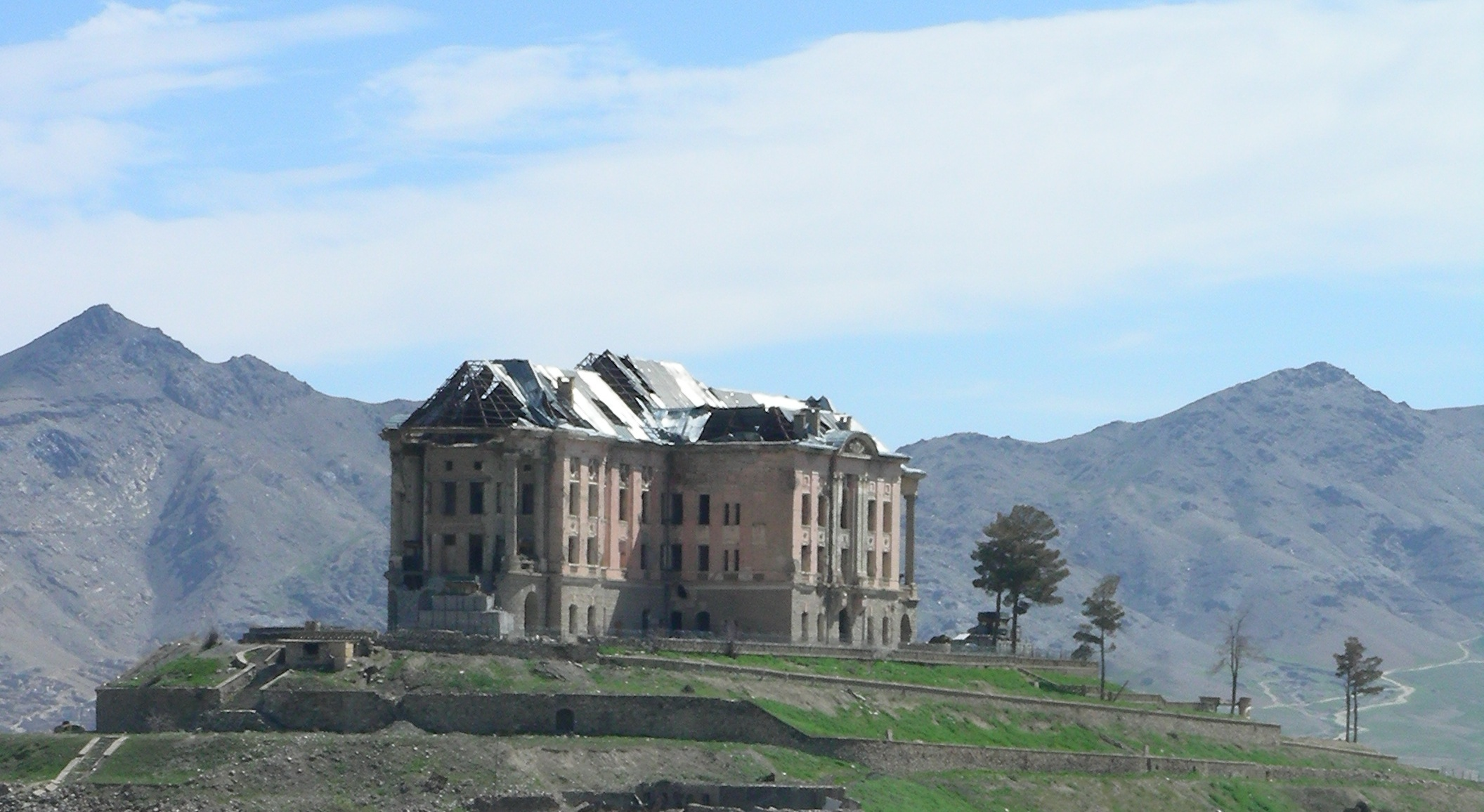
Condition of the palace in 2007

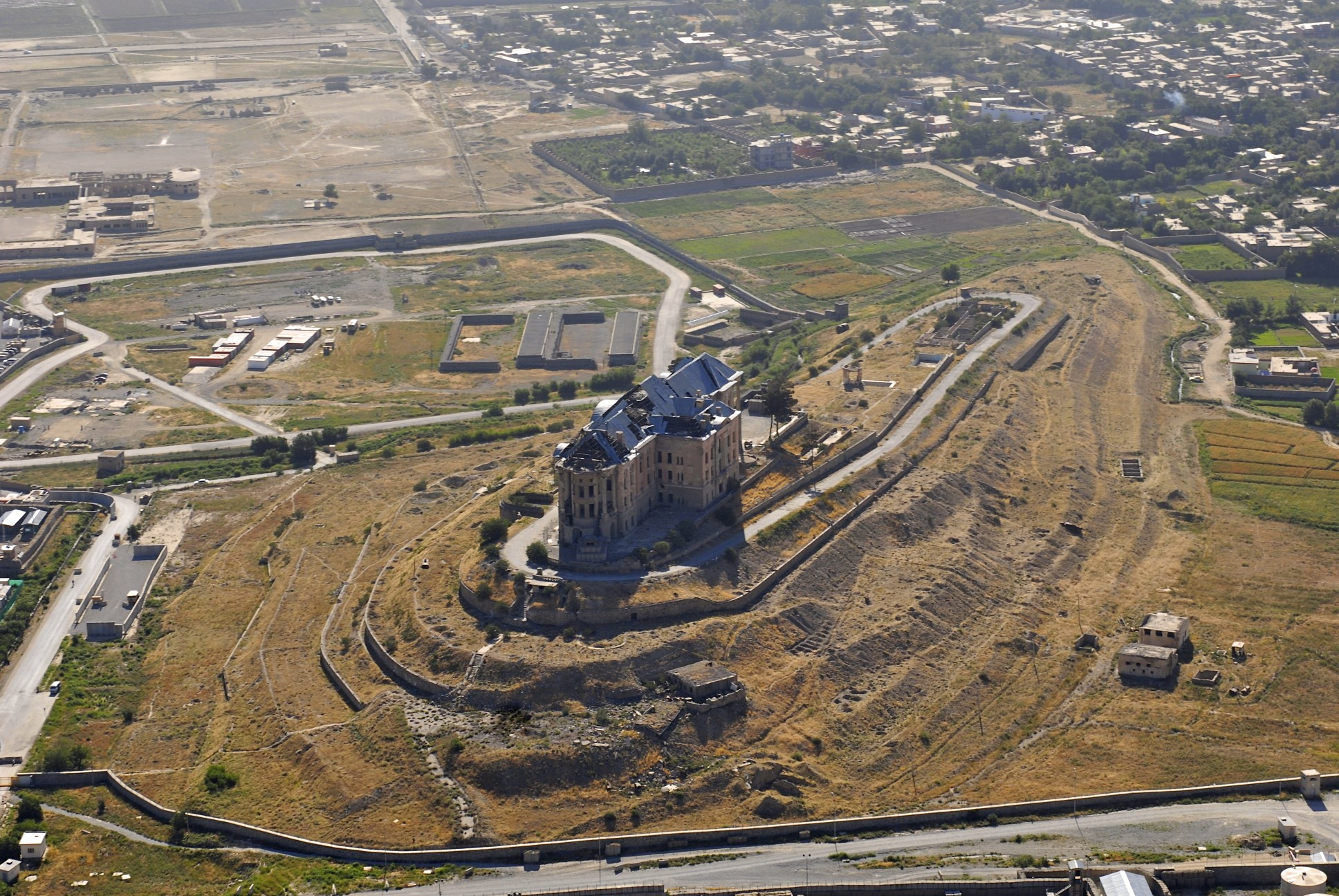
Bird's eye view of the palace in 2012

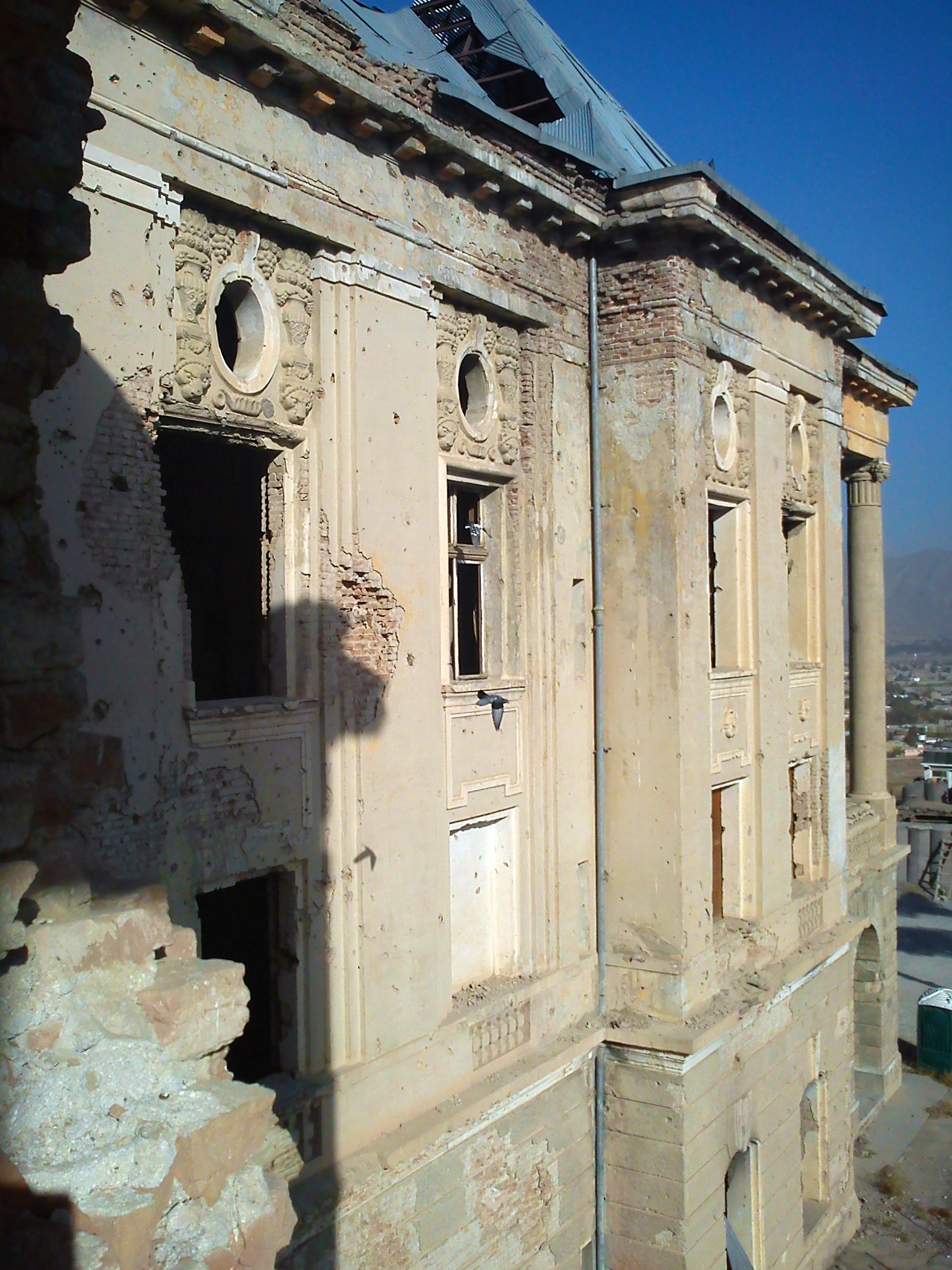
The ruined palace

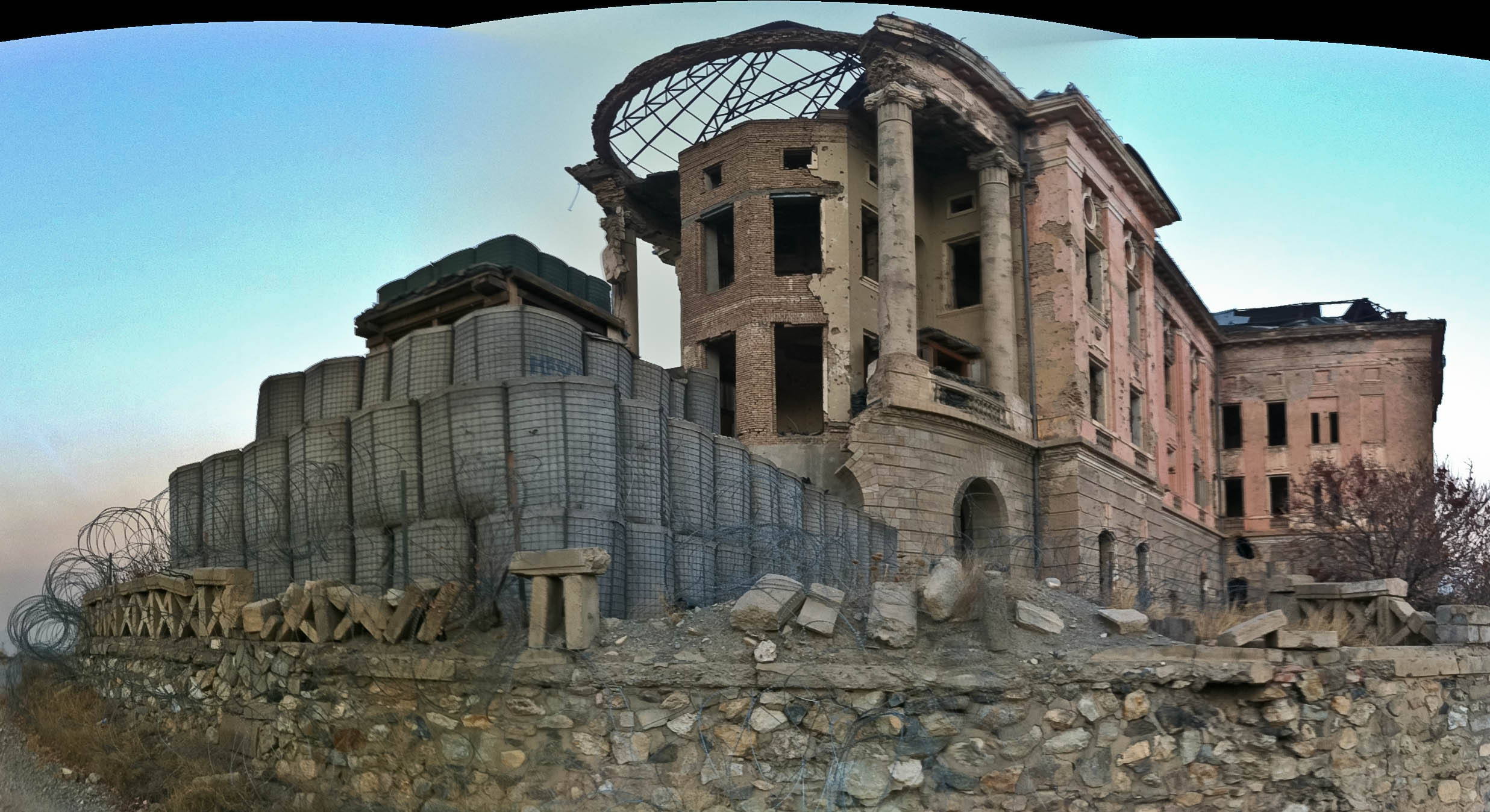
The ruined palace

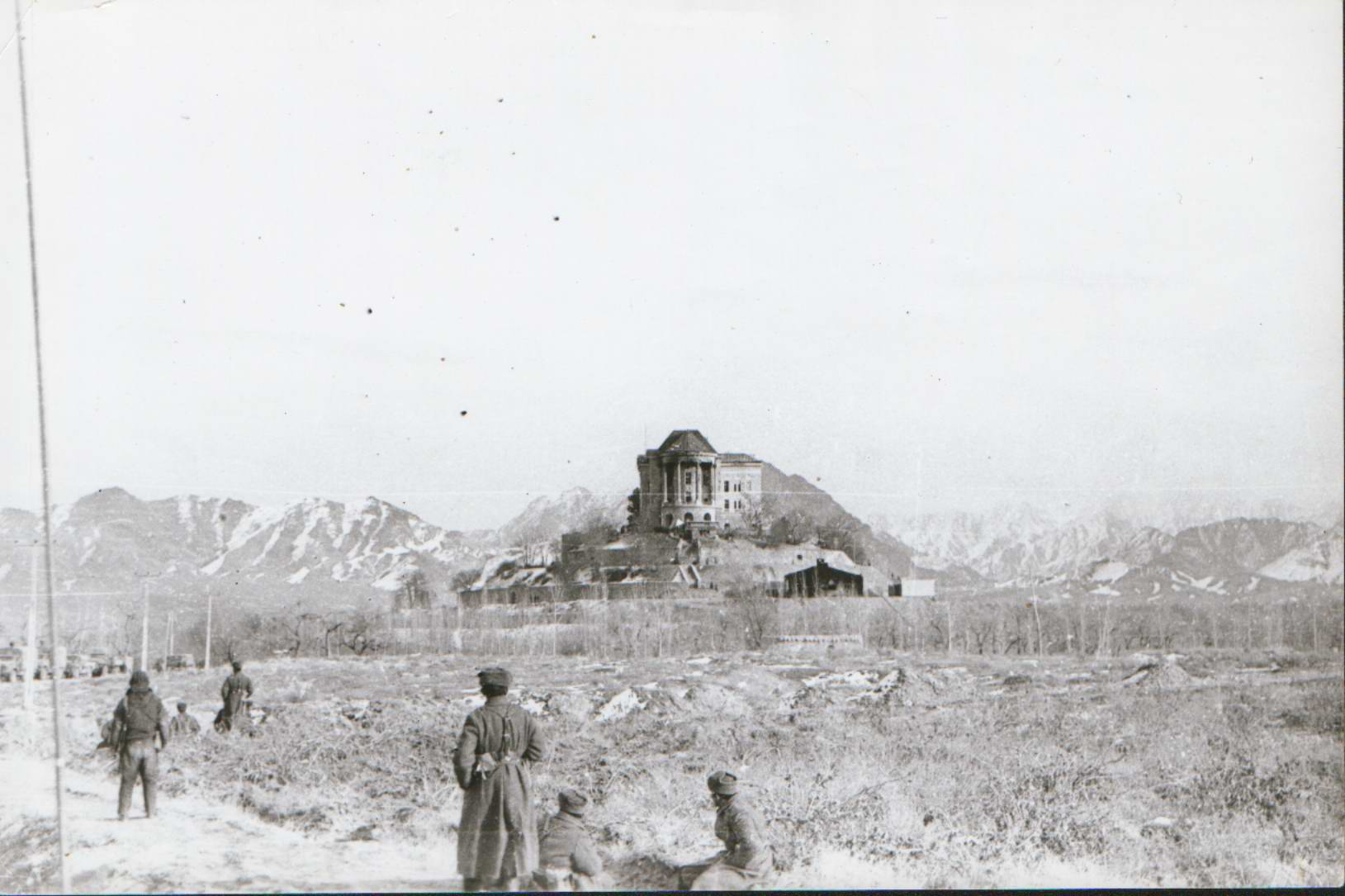
Photograph of the palace's west side during the Soviet assault on 27 December 1979

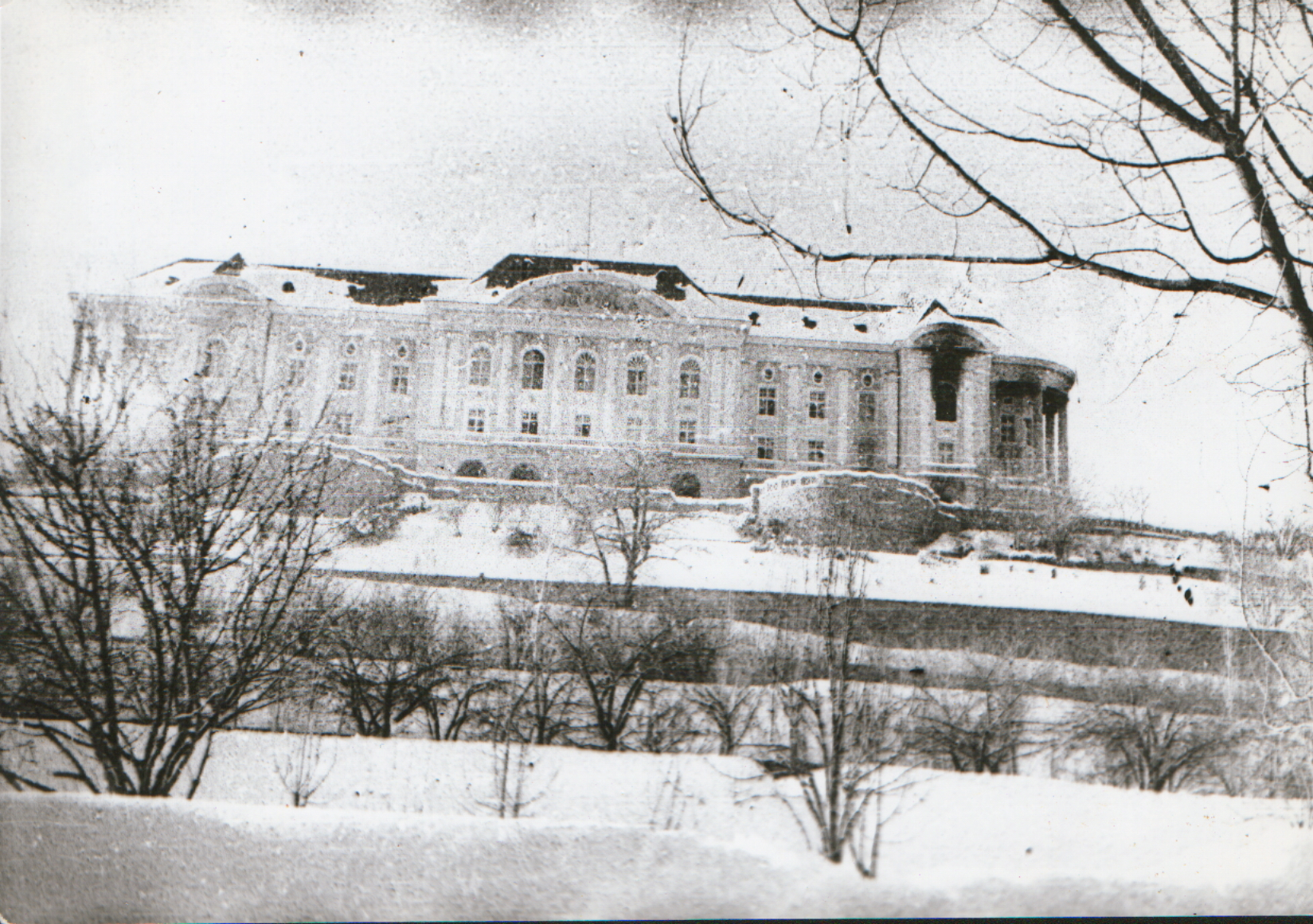
The palace one day after the assault

== See also ==
- Tourism in Afghanistan
- Beg (title)
- Taj Mahal
- Darul Aman Palace
- Bagh-e Bala Palace
