= 1971 in Afghanistan =

- Decades: 1950s; 1960s; 1970s; 1980s; 1990s
- See also: Other events of 1971; List of years in Afghanistan

The following details notable events from the year 1971 in Afghanistan. The Afghan Islamic Republic, is a landlocked country located in the centre of Asia, forming part of Central Asia, South Asia, and the Greater Middle East.

Political life in the capital is dominated by squabbles between the administration and the People's Council. The 1969 elections had returned assembly members who were for the most part quite unfamiliar with parliamentary methods and procedure, at least as laid down in the constitution. The final brush comes over a widely supported demand that questions concerning the administration be dealt with by the minister concerned at the time they are asked. This may not seem serious, but it follows a series of deliberate refusals to pass bills that the government regarded as essential. These refusals were based less on any difference over principles than on the rivalry between groups headed by individual parliamentarians, who, in the absence of political parties, formed cabals linked by a determination to promote local interests. To secure the passage of essential legislation, the king is obliged to intervene, with a threat to dissolve parliament.

== Incumbents ==
- Monarch – Mohammed Zahir Shah
- Prime Minister – Mohammad Nur Ahmad Etemadi (until 9 June), Abdul Zahir (starting 9 June)

== May 17, 1971 ==
Prime Minister Nur Ahmad Etemadi, after being continually frustrated in his efforts to modernize the administration and bring the country forward, resigns. He is persuaded to continue as head of the government until his successor, Abdul Zahir, who was ambassador in Rome, is confirmed as prime minister on June 9. Zahir makes earnest efforts to reach a good understanding with parliament; and when he presents his list of ministers to the king in July, he is able to put forward the general desire that the administration concentrate attention on the difficulties of low-income groups. The king gives an assurance that the wishes of the legislators will be respected.

== August 1971 ==
The government takes the unprecedented step of launching a worldwide appeal for food after the most serious drought in the country's history. The economic life of the country is severely affected; it is feared that almost three-quarters of the nation's sheep, the main meat staple, might have perished. Large numbers of people migrated in search of food and water. The response, especially from Pakistan and Iran, is generous. The government undertakes a massive campaign of relief operations to deal with the emergency, but is hampered by the traditionally independent attitude of remote outlying areas.

== September 1971 ==
Afghanistan's ties with the Muslim world are strengthened by participation in the Islamic conference of foreign ministers that meets in Kabul.
