= 1972 in Afghanistan =

- Decades: 1950s; 1960s; 1970s; 1980s; 1990s
- See also: Other events of 1972; List of years in Afghanistan

Events in the year 1972 in Afghanistan.

== Incumbents ==
- Monarch – Mohammed Zahir Shah
- Prime Minister – Abdul Zahir (until November 12), Mohammad Musa Shafiq (starting November 19)
