= 1968 in Afghanistan =

- Decades: 1940s; 1950s; 1960s; 1970s; 1980s
- See also: Other events of 1968; List of years in Afghanistan

The following lists events that happened during 1968 in Afghanistan.

In domestic affairs the year is marked by a thorough overhaul of the judicial system by the new Supreme Court; this involves reorganizing the powers and functions of the lower courts in line with the requirements of the constitution. In economic affairs the policies laid down in 1967 for encouraging investors in the private sector by substantial inducements – tax holidays, free import of capital goods, and protective tariffs – are continued. Government investment is again directed to the completion of projects begun under the second development plan and to the encouragement of heavy industry. The emphasis is again on consolidation rather than on beginning new projects, and on the gradual replacement of foreign aid by increased exploitation of national resources.

== Incumbents ==
- Monarch – Mohammed Zahir Shah
- Prime Minister – Mohammad Nur Ahmad Etemadi

== End of January 1968 ==
The Soviet Premier, Alexei Kosygin, visits Kabul. The visit is brief, and appears to imply no more than a continuation of the already substantial Soviet aid to heavy industry and communications.

== May 7–11, 1968 ==
French Prime Minister Georges Pompidou pays a visit to Afghanistan.
