= 1903 in Afghanistan =

- Decades: 1880s; 1890s; 1900s; 1910s; 1920s
- See also: Other events of 1903; List of years in Afghanistan

The following lists events that happened during 1903 in Afghanistan.

The year passes quietly, without any internal disturbances, and nothing more is heard, or at least made public, about the attempt of Russia to establish direct intercourse between its own and the Afghan frontier officials for commercial purposes. The amir appoints his brother, Sardar Nasrullah Khan, commander-in-chief, and he orders the construction of a line of fortified serais from Dacca to Kabul, from Kabul to Kotal Manjan, in Badakhshan, from Kabul to the Oxus, and from Balkh to Bala Murghab, on the Russian frontier.

== Incumbents ==
- Monarch – Habibullah Khan

== Events ==
=== Early 1903 ===
The amir is compelled to abandon his project of forming a bodyguard of Afridis owing to the jealousy which it excited, and those who were enlisted are disbanded and sent back to their homes, and their rifles are taken back from them.

- February 4 – Maj. Henry McMahon, the British officer appointed to settle the boundary dispute between Persia and Afghanistan, reaches the Helmand, and is joined by the Afghan commissioner on February 12. The work is said to proceed satisfactorily. A joint Afghan and British commission was appointed to demarcate the boundary between the two countries, from Nawa Kila, where Richard Udny left off in 1895, to the Peiwar, where Mr. Donald began on the Kurram side.

=== Late 1903 ===
It is reported that the amir's half-brother, Mohammad Omar, is suspected of intriguing against him, and that there is a serious dispute between the amir and Mohammad Omar's mother about family jewels.

- late August – There is a severe outbreak of cholera at Kabul, which proves fatal to more than one of the amir's leading officials. The amir himself remains in Kabul throughout the outbreak, doing his utmost to allay the alarm, and personally superintending sanitary reforms.
- October – Thirty-six sepoys are tried by court-martial at Kabul on charges of inciting to rebellion, and are put to death in the presence of all the troops.
- October 16 – The amir holds a great durbar in honour of his accession, and speaks in praise of the mullahs, whom he is said to greatly favour generally.

== Births ==
- Abdul Wahab Khan Tarzi

== Deaths ==
- Sahibzada Abdul Latif
