= 1904 in Afghanistan =

- Decades: 1880s; 1890s; 1900s; 1910s; 1920s
- See also: Other events of 1904; List of years in Afghanistan

The following lists events that happened during 1904 in Afghanistan.

Internal peace is not disturbed during the year, but there are, as usual, frequent rumours of quarrels in the amir's family and of reconciliations. Early in the year it is reported that the amir has removed his half-brother, Mohammad Omar, from the governorship of Kabul, and placed him and his mother, Bibi Halima, under close surveillance. Later on it is stated that the mullahs have brought about a reconciliation, and that Mohammad Omar has been placed in command of the troops in Kabul. There is some quarrelling between Russian and Afghan soldiers owing to the former destroying some guard-houses erected along the border of Turkestan, but there is no actual outbreak, and the amir at once sends officials of position to inquire into the matter. Owing to the generally oppressive action of the Russians some 4,000 of the Turkoman and Jamshid tribes migrate to Herat, where the amir grants them the Zulfikar Pass territory as their place of residence. Several of the leading followers of Ayub Khan return to Afghanistan and others petition the amir to be allowed to do so.

== Incumbents ==
- Monarch – Habibullah Khan

== Early summer 1904 ==
The amir injures his hand whilst snipe shooting, and the viceroy at his request sends his own doctor to Kabul to treat him. The treatment is entirely successful, and the amir's pleasure at this is possibly helpful in paving the way for the despatch of the special mission under Louis Dane, the Indian foreign secretary, which leaves Peshawar on November 26 and reaches Kabul on December 12. Its work is reported to be progressing very satisfactorily.

The nature of this work is not made public, but it is not difficult to conjecture what must be the most important points in the discussion between the amir and Mr. Dane. In the first place, Russia, despite her Far Eastern difficulties and disasters, has by no means lost sight of Afghanistan. Both in Turkestan and the north and towards Herat in the south the Russian railway system is fast being completed to within striking distance of the frontier; the question of direct commercial relations between Russian and Afghan officials on the frontier appears to be still open, and Russia can easily create local trouble whenever it suits her to do so. No doubt the amir likes to know what help Britain would give him in a case of "unprovoked aggression," and, on the other hand, the Indian government likes to know how far the amir can defend himself, what number of troops he can put into the field, and what is their state of efficiency. The relations of the amir and of the Indian government with the tribes on the North-West Frontier also require further adjustment.

A formal settlement was arrived at when what is known as the Durand Boundary was agreed on, and the present amir at first seemed anxious that the work of demarcating this boundary should be completed, but latterly he appears to have changed his mind, and the work has been suspended. Lastly, it is thought that an endeavour might be made to secure greater facilities for trade between Afghanistan and India. Whilst the foreign secretary is engaged in important work with the amir at Kabul the amir's eldest son, Inayatullah Khan, is paying a visit to the viceroy at Calcutta. As he was only 16, his visit was only regarded as a social one, but one which may bear good fruit later if he comes to the throne.
