= 1970 in Afghanistan =

- Decades: 1950s; 1960s; 1970s; 1980s; 1990s
- See also: Other events of 1970; List of years in Afghanistan

The following lists events that happened during 1970 in Afghanistan.

Progress in establishing a modern type of administration throughout the country to replace traditional tribal institutions is steady rather than spectacular. The personal popularity of the king and his firm support of the prime minister ensures growing respect for the central government, but this does not prevent occasional outbreaks of severe intertribal hostilities. An important factor in the modernizing process to which the king has committed himself is the steady improvement of communications with the outside world. Several international airlines call regularly at Kabul, and the road from the capital to the Khyber Pass carries increasingly heavy traffic in both directions. The tourist industry receives a great impetus both from the erection on the road between Kabul and Paghman of a luxury hotel with spectacular views, and from the readiness with which the Afghan diplomatic posts in many countries grant tourist visas. External communications are stimulated by a marked improvement in relations with Pakistan. The Afghan government shows increasing interest in the economic success of the Regional Cooperation for Development program (RCD), which is being vigorously pursued by Pakistan, Iran, and Turkey; a visit to Kabul by the Pakistan finance minister, Nawab Muzaffar Ali Khan Qizilbash, leads to a scheme for technical aid in the fields of irrigation, seeds, and fertilizers to help Afghanistan achieve agricultural self-sufficiency as part of its policy of decreasing its reliance on external aid.

== Incumbents ==
- Monarch – Mohammed Zahir Shah
- Prime Minister – Mohammad Nur Ahmad Etemadi
