= Sardar Abdul Wahab Khan =

19th-20th century Afghan sardar

Abdul Wahab Khan
- عبدالوهاب خان
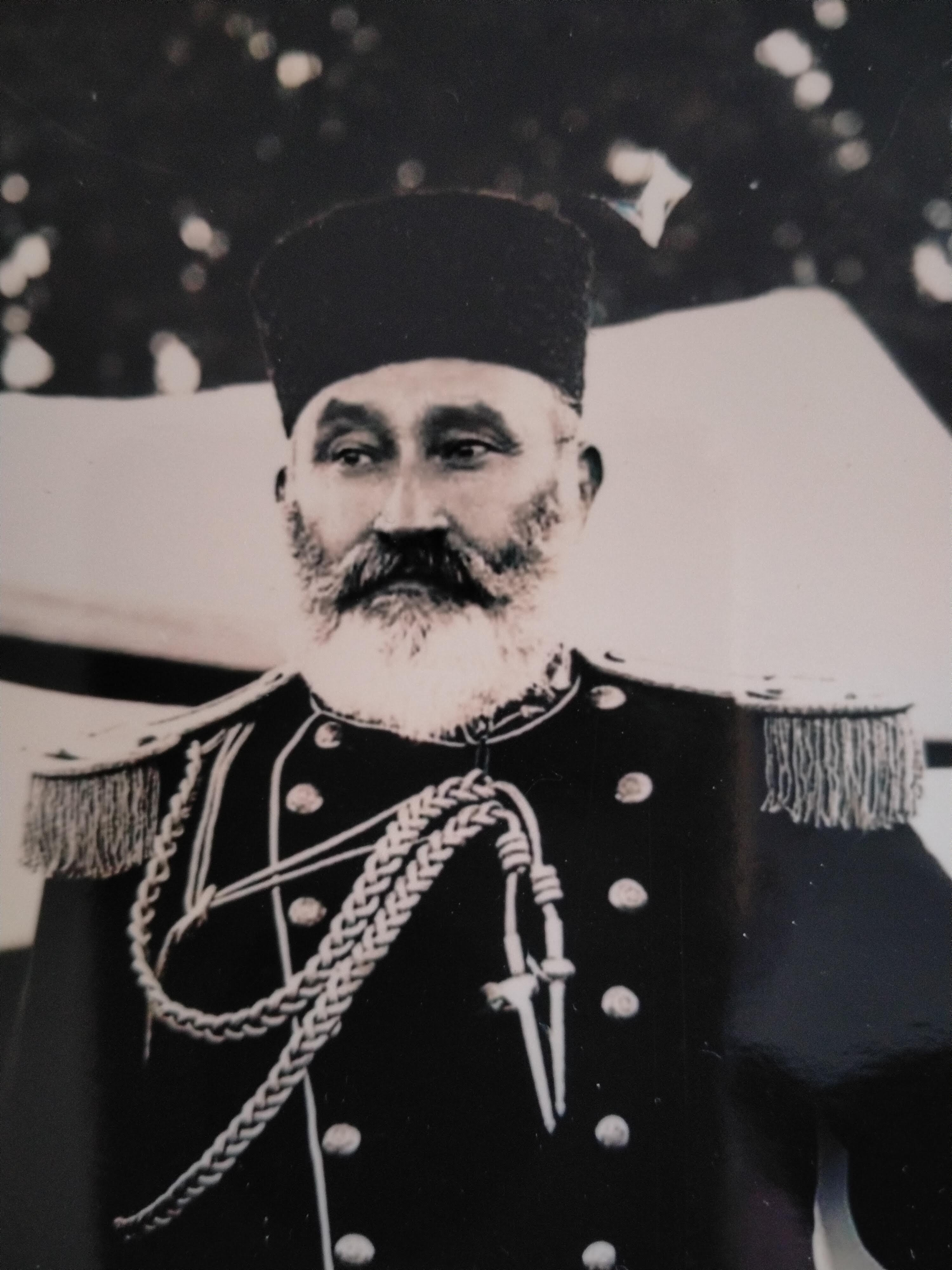
- Born: 1848; Kandahar, Principality of Kandahar
- Died: July 13, 1920 (aged 72); Kabul, Emirate of Afghanistan
- Burial place: Ashiqan wa Arifan Cemetery, Kabul
- Spouse(s): 3 wives - Sakina, Sahib Sultan, Mariam
- Children: 9 sons and 3 daughters
- Parents: Sardar Mir Afzal Khan (father); A Hazara lady (mother)

Sardar Abdul Wahab Khan (Note: Pashto: عبدالوهاب خان, romanized: 'Abd al-Wahhāb Xān [ʔäb.d̪ul wɑb/wä.hɑb xɑn]; Persian: عبدالوهاب خان, romanized: Abd al-Wahhāb Khān [ʔäb.d̪ʊ́l wɑːɑ́ːb/wäɦ.ɦɑ́ːb xɑːn]) (1848 - 13 July 1920) was the former Minister for Education of Afghanistan, civil brigadier and a leading commander during Mohammad Ayub Khan's rebellion in the Second Anglo-Afghan War. When Abdur Rahman Khan was invited by the British to become the new Amir after the defeat of Ayub Khan during the Second Anglo-Afghan War, Abdul Wahab Khan lived in exile for many years in Persia (now Iran) then in British India before returning to Kabul with his son, Sardar Abdul Habib Khan in 1903.

He was the Governor of the following provinces and districts at various times:

- Grishk
- Ghor
- Farah
- Herat
- Balkh

== Early life ==
Abdul Wahab Khan was born to Mir Afzal Khan in Kandahar (son of Pur Dil Khan), a member of the Mohammadzai branch of the Barakzai tribe of the Pashtuns, who was the former governor of Kandahar until the Second Anglo-Afghan War, and was born to the latter's fourth wife, a Hazara lady. His brother General Abdur Rahim Khan was commanded at Herat in 1912 and Jalalabad in 1918 before becoming Governor of Jalalabad in 1919, and is a great-grandson from the fifth wife of Payandah Khan, who was a Ghilji.

He was also a second cousin of Sher Ali Khan, as his grandfather Pur Dil Khan was a half brother of Sher Ali Khan's father Dost Mohammad Khan. Abdul Wahab Khan's half sister, Ayesha was married to Sher Ali Khan and was considered to be Sher Ali's favourite wife that bore him a son named Abdullah Jan that he made heir apparent over his older son from a different wife, Mohammad Yaqub Khan.

== Second Anglo-Afghan War ==
Abdul Wahab Khan was allied with Sher Ali Khan then later with Sher Ali's successor and son Ayub Khan. This alliance made him a natural opponent of Abdur Rahman Khan who battled both Sher Ali and Ayub Khan for power when they each were rulers of Afghanistan. During the Second Anglo-Afghan War Abdul Wahab Khan participated in the Battle of Maiwand with Ayub Khan in 1880 which resulted in the defeat of the British.

Once Rahman Khan became the ruler of Afghanistan with the help of the British, Wahab Khan together with his family fled to Persia (now Iran) as political refugees. The British offered him a monetary allowance on the condition that he relocate to British India, to eliminate any possibility of him rebelling with Ayub Khan against Rahman Khan in Herat, he accepted.

== Exile in Persia and British India ==
Abdul Wahab Khan was the Governor of Herat during Ayub Khan's rebellion against the British during the Second Anglo-Afghan War. When Ayub Khan was defeated by the British in the Battle of Kandahar (1880) both Ayub Khan and Abdul Wahab Khan took refuge in Persia and was receiving 100 tomans a month pension from the British Government. Some time later, Ayub Khan fled Tehran and Abdul Wahab Khan was arrested on Sir Arthur Nicolson's orders who at the time was the British Chargé d'affaires to Iran.

Abdul Wahab Khan requested Nicolson to write him a referral, which he did on 14 October 1887 promising him proper treatment if Abdul Wahab Khan relocated to British India on the condition that he conducts himself well and did whatever the Government of India asked of him. It was common British policy to relocate Afghan Sardars to British India and provide them with pensions, and hence out of potential rebellion against British interests in Afghanistan during the reign of Abdur Rahman Khan.

Abdul Wahab Khan arrived in Karachi soon after and was paid 80 to 100 rupees a day to support his family, and then after four months a pension of 250 rupees a month (pre-tax) was allocated to him. However it soon became clear the amount wasn't sufficient for his large family of over 30 people to live comfortably. Some time later he moved his family to Lahore, living in a house outside Mochi Gate. He lived for 10 years in British India, lodging multiple petitions to have his pension increased and all being denied. He resorted to borrowing and incurred debts of 10,000 rupees before finally deciding to flee British India on 18 February 1898 and returning to Persia, leaving his family behind in Lahore with his eldest son Sardar Abdul Habib Khan in charge of their family matters in British India. The government approved a reduced pension of 150 rupees a month for his family in Lahore which was even more difficult for them.

Abdul Habib Khan complained to the Government of India that other Afghan refugees were getting 2–3 rupees for every Kiran (Iranian currency) they held when they migrated from Persia to British India, but his father who held 700 Kirans was given only 250 rupees. On top of that further income tax was deducted, while other Afghans from Persia were exempted from the income tax.

In Tehran on 15 March 1899, Abdul Wahab Khan wrote a petition for a pension to pay his debts and support his family in British India to Sir H. Mortimer Durand who at the time was the British ambassador to Iran. Durand replied on 24 April 1899 stating that he had no power in the matters raised by Abdul Wahab Khan, but will send his request to the Government of India for a decision.

== Return to Afghanistan ==
With the death of Amir Abdur Rahman Khan, and under the new rein of his successor and son Amir Habibullah Khan, Abdul Wahab Khan and other Sardars who were exiled during the reign of Abdur Rahman Khan returned to Kabul in 1903 under the invitation of the new Amir.

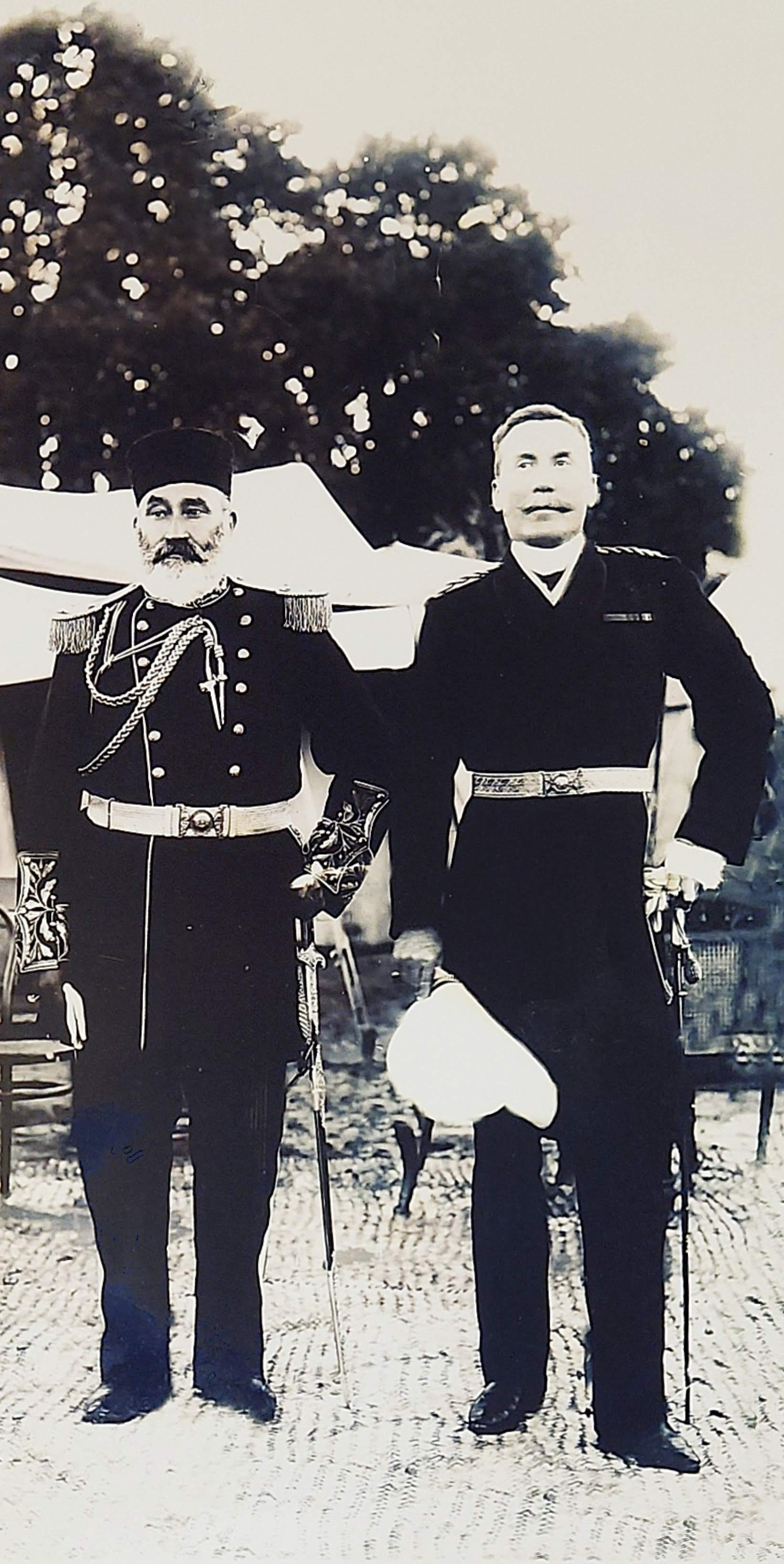
Sardar Abdul Wahab Khan and Sir Louis William Dane in Kabul c. 1904-1905

Under Habibullah Khan he held the position of Secretary in Charge of Correspondence and rank of Civil Brigadier (Na'eb Salar Mulki) and was involved in the negotiations of a new treaty between the British and Habibullah Khan during the "Dane Mission" lead by Sir Louis W. Dane. He also accompanied the Amir during his Herat tour in 1907. He served on Boundary Commission in 1910 and was appointed Governor of Turkestan (Na'eb-ul-Hukumah) and rank of Civil General in 1911. He was reported to be both popular and energetic as a Governor in Mazar-i-Sharif in 1914. He was likely present at the Amir's hunting party in February 1919 during which he was assassinated.

Under Amir Amanullah Khan he resumed his duties as Secretary in Charge of Correspondence after returning from Turkestan and left for Bukhara in April 1919 with Muhammad Wali Khan (who was previously ranked as Sardar-i-Ale which translates to "Highest Afghan Decoration" and custodian of Amir Habibullah's secret correspondence and documents then later appointed Ambassador at Bukhara in April 1919 by Amir Amanullah Khan) who the Amir had sent on various diplomatic missions abroad to Uzbekistan, Russia, Europe and US between June 1919 and May 1922.

He was later reported to have been appointed as the Minister for Education in December 1919. Two of his sons from his first wife Sakina: Abdur Rahman Khan (rank of Civil Colonel - Sarteb Mulki) who was an envoy to India and member of Afghan Peace Delegates to Rawalpindi during the Third Anglo-Afghan War, and Abdul Habib Khan (was at one time residing in Lahore in 1899) were both appointed Ministers of Education in succession after him. Abdur Rahman Khan was later appointed Deputy to the Foreign Secretary in February 1920.

== Ancestry ==
Ancestors of Sardar Abdul Wahab Khan

16. Hajji Jamal Khan
8. Sardar Payandah Khan
4. Sardar Pur Dil Khan
9. Fifth Wife (Ghilji)
2. Sardar Mir Afzal Khan
1. Sardar Abdul Wahab Khan
3. Fourth Wife (Hazara)

Descendants of Sardar Abdul Wahab Khan
- Sardar Abdul Wahab Khan
  - Sardar Abdul Azim Khan
    - Karimullah
    - Aisha
    - Farukh
    - Abdul Qadir
    - Abdur Rahim
  - Sardar Abdul Aziz Khan
    - Gul Ghutai
    - Hamida
    - Aziza
    - Muhammad Hussain
    - Hafizullah
    - Sultan Aziz
    - Bahija (maternal granddaughter of Muhammad Zaman Khan Tarzi)
    - Azizullah (maternal grandson of Muhammad Zaman Khan Tarzi)
      - Najibullah
        - Wahab
          - Tamim
          - Tayeb
        - Humaira
          - Zilaikha
          - Majd
          - Naweed
        - Tariq
          - Aisha
          - Waleed
            - Hafsa
        - Sulaiman
          - Ibrahim
          - Ismael
  - Sardar Abdur Rahman Khan
    - Fatima
    - Sultan Ahmad
    - Ghulam Muhammad
    - Abdullah
    - Afifa Sultan
    - Shamsuddin
    - Ali Ahmad
    - Shaida Sultan
    - Hamdam Sultan
  - Sardar Abdul Habib Khan
    - Mariam
    - Muhammad Jan
    - Aziza
    - Humaira
      - Rabia
      - Safia
      - Muhammad Kabir
      - Muhammad Akbar
      - Muhammad Ayub
    - Farukh Sultan
    - Fazlullah
    - Obaidullah
    - Abdul Wali
    - Abdul Ali
      - Shahera
        - Fereshta
        - Yama
  - Tahera
  - Siddiqa
  - Aliya
  - Sardar Abdul Ahad Khan
    - Zubaida
    - Asiya
    - Marie
    - Hasibullah
    - Abdullah
    - Abdul Ahmad
    - Abdul Wahid
    - Abdul Samad
    - Rahima
  - Sardar Abdul Hakim Khan
    - Abdur Rahim
    - Marie
    - Najia
    - Qudsia
    - Muhammad Amin
  - Sardar Abdul Karim Khan
    - Tirina
    - Latifa
    - Mina
    - Hamidullah
    - Rahima
    - Muhammad Amin
    - Najibullah
    - Fazila
    - Obaidullah
    - Habibullah
    - Abdulillah
    - Abdullah
    - Khalilullah
    - Marie
  - Sardar Abdul Quddus Khan
  - Sardar Abdul Qayum Khan
    - Abdul Hamid
    - Fereshta
    - Ramzia
    - Abdur Rahman
    - Abdul Hai
    - Azada
    - Abdul Mubain
    - Farkhunda

== See also ==
- 1905 in Afghanistan
