= 1967 in Afghanistan =

- Decades: 1940s; 1950s; 1960s; 1970s; 1980s
- See also: Other events of 1967; List of years in Afghanistan

The following lists events that happened during 1967 in Afghanistan.

Among the difficulties that Afghanistan, together with other developing countries, faces is the shortage of local investment capital. Accordingly, the government offers considerable inducements in the third five-year plan to investors in the private sector. Capital goods for approved industries can be imported free; there is an income-tax holiday for three years after production started; and import tariffs on a protective scale are to shelter locally produced goods from foreign competition. These measures are designed to minimize direct government participation in the sphere of light industry, so that funds can be made available for the completion of projects begun during the second plan and for additional investment in heavy industry. During 1967 about 131 development projects are underwritten at a cost of 5 billion Afghanis. These fall into three main groups: mines and industry; irrigation and agriculture; and communications and social services. But in general, emphasis is placed on consolidation. A major objective of the government is to reduce by degrees excessive dependence upon foreign aid for national development. This is likely to take some time, particularly since such aid is readily available from the U.S.S.R., the United States, and the World Bank, to say nothing of West Germany, Britain, and China. Additional assistance in such projects as match manufacture, tanning, shoe manufacture, and furniture making comes from Sweden and France. All this does not change the traditional Afghan determination to treat other nations as friends but not as masters, and to retain complete control over domestic and foreign policies. An example of this is the vesting of the new internal air services linking Kabul with many formerly remote areas in the official Afghan Air Authority. Relations with Pakistan ease further, along with an increase in trade.

== Incumbents ==
- Monarch – Mohammed Zahir Shah
- Prime Minister –
  - until 11 October – Mohammad Hashim Maiwandwal
  - 11 October – 1 November – Abdullah Yaqta
  - starting 1 November – Mohammad Nur Ahmad Etemadi

== March 28, 1967 ==
Maiwandwal meets with U.S. President Lyndon B. Johnson during a visit to Washington, D.C.

== May 1967 ==
The Soviet head of state, Nikolai Podgorny, pays a visit to witness the opening of the Soviet-aided Naghlu Dam.

== October 11, 1967 ==
Prime Minister Maiwandwal resigns for health reasons, the king asking Abdullah Yaqta, Minister of State, to assume the premiership ad interim pending the formation of a new government. Maiwandwal's resignation is widely regretted, since he is looked upon as one of the main architects of the new Afghanistan. He successfully concluded the second five-year development plan and launched the third; he won national confidence in the 1964 constitution, which liberalized the political structure of the country; his visits abroad strengthened Afghanistan's international position and its traditional policy of friendship without involvement. He eased relations with Pakistan and gave a new impetus to the growth of trade between the two countries. Only a few days after Maiwandwal's resignation, the king takes the final step to complete the structure of the government as contemplated in the 1964 constitution by inaugurating the Supreme Court. This body, consisting of eight judges presided over by Abdul Hakim Ziayee, a prominent jurist with experience in diplomacy, completes the separation of powers among the Executive, the Legislature, and the Judiciary.

== November 1, 1967 ==
Nur Ahmad Etemadi, First Deputy Premier and Foreign Minister, is appointed Prime Minister. Etemadi, a firm believer in his predecessor's domestic and foreign policies, retains the foreign portfolio and otherwise makes few changes in the personnel of the cabinet.
