= 1969 in Afghanistan =

- Decades: 1940s; 1950s; 1960s; 1970s; 1980s
- See also: Other events of 1969; List of years in Afghanistan

The following lists events that happened during 1969 in Afghanistan.

Domestically, the year is one of quiet administrative and economic progress. The division of powers among the executive, the legislature, and the judiciary laid down in the 1964 constitution, although virtually completed in 1968, entails much detailed work in its precise application to existing institutions. This is especially true in the judicial field, where the structure and functions of the lower courts, previously shaped largely by tradition, are found to need considerable alteration. The changes necessitated in this, as in other branches of the administration, are effected with little friction, due to the popularity of the prime minister and to the steady support which he receives from the king.

In the economic field, the policy of mobilizing local resources to replace by degrees the massive foreign aid furnished by the U.S. and the U.S.S.R. continues in accordance with Afghan determination to avoid undue dependence on external help. The main difficulty lies in the shortage of capital for investment in the private sector; and in spite of the inducements proffered by the government growth is slow.

In foreign affairs, the traditional Afghan desire to preserve complete autonomy regardless of external aid and to maintain friendly relations with other countries remains dominant. India's desire for close relations is shown by a visit from Prime Minister Indira Gandhi and by Indian aid in the restoration of the Bamiyan antiquities. Relations with Pakistan and with its new government after the fall of President Mohammad Ayub Khan are correct rather than cordial because of continued Afghan support for the promotion of Pakhtunistan. This support again becomes vocal when the Pakistan government incorporates the states of Dir, Swat, and Chitral, hitherto domestically autonomous, into the administrative structure of West Pakistan, in accordance, it is claimed, with the wishes of the states' peoples. The resulting resentment in Afghanistan does not last, and the country's policy of friendly neutrality toward both the Communist and non-Communist worlds continues smoothly.

== Incumbents ==
- Monarch – Mohammed Zahir Shah
- Prime Minister – Mohammad Nur Ahmad Etemadi

== May 1969 ==
Soviet Premier Alexei Kosygin arrives to attend the country's 50th independence day celebrations.

== Early June 1969 ==
As Afghanistan does not escape the worldwide spread of radical ideas among the student population, the government finds it necessary to close Kabul University temporarily because of student unrest. Secondary schools in the capital are also shut, but there are no serious disturbances.

== 29 August - 11 September 1969 ==
Afghanistan holds its second free parliamentary election since the introduction of the constitution in 1964, with candidates standing for the 216 seats of the House of the People and for one-third of the House of Elders. Many conservative local landowners who have shunned the first election campaign for office and win seats. Often they win at the expense of more liberal, national-minded incumbents; the new parliament, thus, is more conservative than the previous one. Since political parties were not legalized in time for the elections, most of the candidates are men of local prominence again chosen for their personal prestige rather than their political views. Turnout is much higher than in 1965, but still only about 50%; except in times of national crisis political life is so highly localized that interest in central institutions remains minimal, although in Kabul and its environs live broadcasts of the proceedings in Parliament, which result in the confirmation (as required by the 1964 constitution) of Prime Minister Nur Ahmad Etemadi and his new cabinet, attract large crowds of listeners.
