= 1973 in Afghanistan =

- Decades: 1950s; 1960s; 1970s; 1980s; 1990s
- See also: Other events of 1973; List of years in Afghanistan

The following lists events that happened during 1973 in Afghanistan.

== Incumbents ==
- Monarch: Mohammed Zahir Shah (until 17 July)
- President: Mohammed Daoud Khan (starting 17 July)
- Prime Minister: Mohammad Musa Shafiq (until 17 July)
