= 1962 in Afghanistan =

- Decades: 1940s; 1950s; 1960s; 1970s; 1980s
- See also: Other events of 1962; List of years in Afghanistan

The following lists events that happened during 1962 in the Kingdom of Afghanistan.

== Incumbents ==
- Monarch – Mohammed Zahir Shah
- Prime Minister – Mohammed Daoud Khan

== January 1962 ==
On January 22, 1962, the United States announces that Afghanistan has agreed to open the border for eight weeks following January 29, 1962, in order to allow aid supplies to enter from Pakistan. Meanwhile, the U.S. ambassador, Henry A. Byroade, continues efforts to open the border from Pakistan; the only alternative routes for aid supplies are from the north via Soviet rail connections, or through Iran at a cost of $70 per ton extra. In April the Afghan government signs an agreement with the Iranian government for use of the route through Iran.

The Iranian ambassador to Pakistan, Hassan Arafa, proposes that the best solution to Afghanistan's problems lies in the formation of an Iran-Afghan-Pakistan confederation. Kabul refuses to consider the proposal. During July and early August the Shah of Iran visits both Pakistan and Afghanistan in an effort at conciliation.

== April 1962 ==
A second five-year plan is announced by Prime Minister Mohammad Daud, with a foreign-aid requirement of $734,000,000 for the expansion of mines, industries, agriculture, and communications. In June the U.S. expresses its unwillingness to make a firm commitment of funds over a five-year period. The Afghans also seek commitments from Japan, Italy, and Yugoslavia.

On April 9, 1962, a rural development project is begun at Ander, designed to improve farming, health, and schooling for about 100,000 people.

== May 6, 1962 ==
A hydroelectric plant, built with Soviet assistance, is opened in northern Afghanistan.
