= 1925 in Afghanistan =

- Decades: 1900s; 1910s; 1920s; 1930s; 1940s
- See also: Other events of 1925; List of years in Afghanistan

The following lists events that happened during 1925 in Afghanistan.

== Incumbents ==
- Monarch – Amanullah Khan

== January–May ==
The amir takes severe measures to prevent a recrudescence of the rebellion among the Khost tribes which gave him so much trouble in the previous year. Early in February two shopkeepers in Kabul, members of the Ahmadiyya community of Muslims, and followers of the Quadian Mullah who was executed in the previous summer for fomenting the rebellion, are sentenced to death by stoning for apostasy, and the sentence is carried out with great barbarity in the presence of Afghan officials. In the course of the same month there is a general dragooning of the revolted tribes. According to the Afghan newspapers, in two weeks all the Mangal villages are occupied, 3,500 houses are bombarded and burnt, 1,575 rebels are killed and wounded, 460 women and children die of cold and hunger during their flight in the snow, and 6,000 head of cattle and an immense booty are captured. The returning troops make a triumphal entry into Jalalabad, where flowers are showered on them by the amir and his mother. On May 25, sixty Khost rebels, mainly Ghilzais, are shot by order of the amir. After the rebellion, the amir does not prosecute further his reforming designs, and leaves the country in the traditional state. He devotes his energies to increasing its military power, having fifty young Afghans trained as airmen, and importing aeroplanes from Russia and large quantities of ammunition through India.

As the Soviet government continues to make sedulous efforts to extend Russian influence in Afghanistan, negotiations are commenced for a Russo-Afghan trade convention, and there is a steady infiltration of Russians prospecting for oil round Herat and in Afghan Turkestan. The Afghan government looks with disfavour on this activity, and it becomes genuinely alarmed at Russian designs when, near the end of December, Russian troops occupy an island in the Oxus at Darkad, which has always been regarded as Afghan territory, overpowering two Afghan posts by which it was held.

== June–August ==
An "incident" occurs which for a time disturbs the relations between Afghanistan and Italy. An Italian engineer resident in Kabul named Dario Piperno is condemned to death by the Afghan court for killing a policeman who was trying to arrest him for some offence. On the Italian government offering to pay "blood money" for him, he is promised his release, but after the blood money has been duly paid, he is executed on June 2. Benito Mussolini at once makes a formal protest against the execution, and hands a note to the Afghan minister in Rome, demanding that the Afghan minister for foreign affairs should call in person on the Italian minister in Kabul to express his regret at the incident, while a company of Afghan soldiers was to salute the Italian flag. He further demands the payment of an indemnity of £7,000, in addition to the restoration of the blood money. The Afghan government procrastinates so long with its reply as to exhaust the patience of the Italian government, and a rupture of diplomatic relations is imminent when, on August 17, a telegram reaches Rome stating that the Afghan government has agreed to come to terms. It is announced the next day that the Afghan foreign minister has presented the apologies of his government to the Italian minister at Kabul, and has handed over £6,000 as indemnity and as repayment of the blood money. Good relations between the two countries are thereupon resumed.

== Births ==
- date unknown - Mohammad Hasan Sharq, politician
