= 1918 in Afghanistan =

- Decades: 1890s; 1900s; 1910s; 1920s; 1930s
- See also: Other events of 1918; List of years in Afghanistan

The following events happened during 1918 in Afghanistan or are related to the history of that country that year.

== Incumbents ==
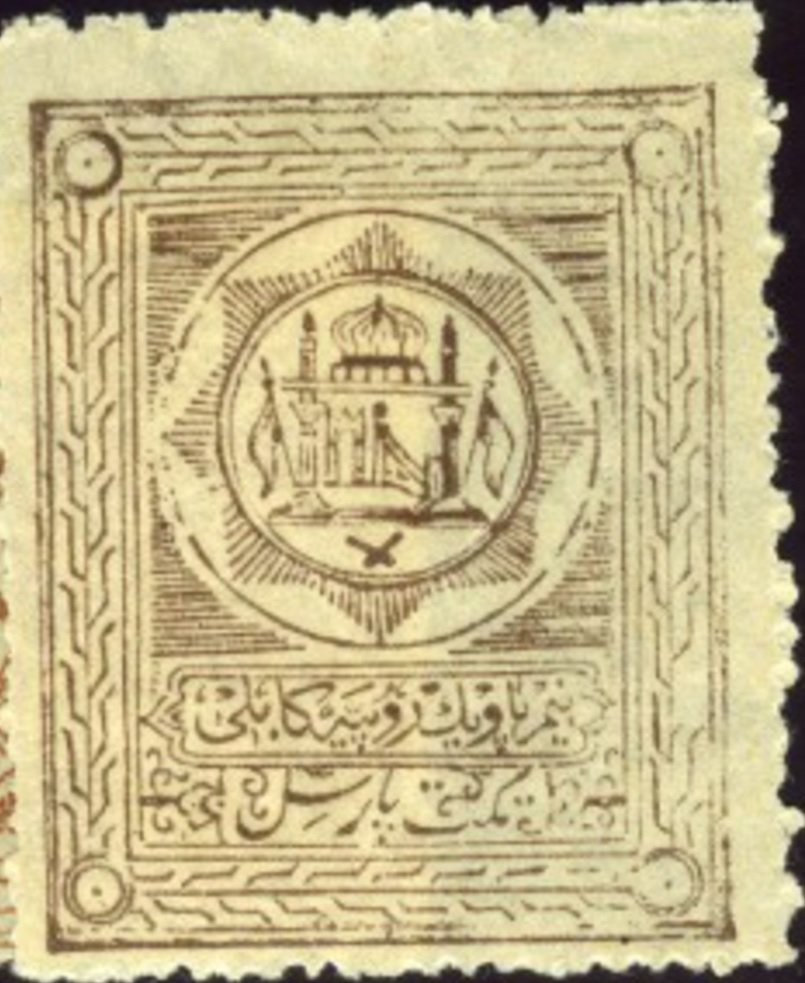
- 1918 Afghan postal stamp
  Monarch – Habibullah Khan

== Events ==
Early that year, starvation is reported near Herat due to excessive food exportation to Russian Turkistan.

At the end of the war, Afghanistan is hit by the influenza epidemic.

== International relations ==
The Amir continues to maintain his neutrality in the war.

January: In the British Parliament, Viscount Bryce has the following question to Lord Islington, Parliamentary under-secretary of state for India: ”whether the Russian Government raised (...) the question of solving certain problems in the districts of Northern Afghanistan adjoining Russian territory”, to which the latter’s answer is the following: ”a Memorandum addressed to His Majesty's Government by the Russian Ambassador on March 22, 1915, in connection with the ultimate terms of peace, suggested among other matters that the 411 Russian zone in Persia—...—should be slightly readjusted so as to transfer from the neutral to the Russian zone a small area in the neighbourhood of the Russian and Afghan frontiers. This proposal, had it been carried out, would not have affected Afghan territorial interests. (...) These proposals never came to a head and could not have been carried into effect without the Ameer's consent. No proposal affecting the territorial integrity of Afghanistan has been made either in the Memorandum or elsewhere.”

== Publications ==
April: E. M. Wherry, ”The First American Mission in Afghanistan”, in The Muslim World

== Links ==
- Afghanistan in 1918 at Ethnia.org
- View of Kabul in 1918 at Getty Images
