= 1911 in Afghanistan =

- Decades: 1890s; 1900s; 1910s; 1920s; 1930s
- See also: Other events of 1911; List of years in Afghanistan

The following lists events that happened during 1911 in Afghanistan.

== Incumbents ==
- Monarch – Habibullah Khan

== 1911-1918 ==
An Afghan nationalist, Mahmud Tarzi, publishes the periodical Seraj ol-Akbar ("Torch of the News"). It is the country's first medium for the intellectual exchange of ideas, and its political influence extends beyond the boundaries of Afghanistan.

== 1911 ==
Again Afghanistan is "happy in having no history". The amir is loyal in carrying out the agreement for the removal of outlaws to beyond fifty miles of the Indian frontier, but this has not wholly stopped the raids. In Afghanistan itself the road between Kabul and Jalalabad is for a considerable time unsafe for traders, but matters improve towards the end of the year. The amir directs much attention to the improvement of the main roads throughout the country, more especially in the direction of Jalalabad and Kandahar.
