= 1919 in Afghanistan =

- Decades: 1890s; 1900s; 1910s; 1920s; 1930s
- See also: Other events of 1919; List of years in Afghanistan

The following lists events that happened during 1919 in Afghanistan.

== Incumbents ==
- Monarch – Habibullah Khan (until February 20), Nasrullah Khan (February 21-February 28), Amanullah Khan (starting February 28)

== February 20, 1919 ==
The amir Habibullah Khan, who was a loyal friend to Britain, is murdered whilst camping in the Laghman Valley, one of many river valleys located within Laghman Province, near the Afghanistan-Pakistan border. Following the murder, different contenders compete for the throne. At Jalalabad, a proclamation is issued that Nasrullah Khan has assumed the throne, but in Kabul power is seized by Amanullah Khan, the third son of the late amir. Amanullah's mother was Habibullah's chief wife; but the late amir's eldest son, Inayatullah, appears to have supported the claims of Nasrullah. Amanullah soon shows, however, that he has control of the situation and the rival claimant withdraws. There is more than a suspicion that Nasrullah (a brother of the late sovereign) was not unduly disturbed at Habibullah's assassination. The new amir, Amanullah, begins his reign by announcing that he will punish those who are guilty of the assassination of his father, that he will institute reforms in the country, including the abolition of virtual slavery, which exists in a disguised form, and that he will preserve the tradition of friendship with India. On April 13, a durbar is held at Kabul to investigate the assassination of the late amir. A colonel is found guilty of committing the murder and executed, and the new amir's uncle, Nasrullah, is found guilty of complicity in the crime, and is sentenced to life imprisonment.

== Early May 1919 ==
Amanullah launches what becomes known as the Third Anglo-Afghan War. A large Afghan army pours across the Indian frontier and proceeds to pillage far and wide in the northwest provinces. Within a few days, and before the Afghans have suffered any serious defeats, the amir enters into tentative negotiations with the Indian government. The fighting continues, however, under the command of British forces on the frontier led by Gen. Sir Arthur Barrett. The aeroplanes attached to the Anglo-Indian forces bomb both Jalalabad and Kabul. After much procrastination, a peace conference is opened at Rawalpindi on July 26; Sir Hamilton Grant represented the Indian government and Sardar Ali Ahmad Khan, a scion of the Barakzai tribe, represented the amir. A preliminary peace (the Treaty of Rawalpindi) is signed on August 8. By the terms of the agreement, the arrears of the late amir's subsidy are confiscated, and no subsidy is to be paid at present to the new amir. The Afghan privilege of importing arms and ammunition from India is also withdrawn. The Indian government demarcates the frontier in the region of the Khyber and the Afghans must accept this demarcation. The Indian government expresses its willingness, however, to receive another Afghan mission six months later. Moreover, there is another item in the agreement which is subsequently made known and which evokes considerable criticism in England. In the past there was an agreement between Britain and Afghanistan that Afghanistan would have no relations with any foreign government except Britain. According to the new treaty, this stipulation is withdrawn, the amir's government thus obtaining full liberty to enter into relations with any other foreign government. It is regarded by many as a sinister comment on this agreement that during the year the amir sends a mission to Moscow.

== April 13, 1919 ==
Amir Amanullah Khan declared Afghanistan's independence from Britain.
