= 1921 in Afghanistan =

- Decades: 1900s; 1910s; 1920s; 1930s; 1940s
- See also: Other events of 1921; List of years in Afghanistan

The following events happened during 1921 in Afghanistan.

== Incumbents ==
- Monarch – Amanullah Khan

== Early January 1921 ==
Henry Dobbs arrives in Kabul to continue the conversations which were begun at Mussoorie in the previous year.

== Early 1921 ==
A mission of five members, headed by Gen. Mohammad Daoud Khan, leaves Afghanistan for Europe in order to examine the possibility of entering into political and commercial relations with European states. The mission visits Moscow, where in March it signs a Turco-Afghan treaty providing for mutual assistance between the two countries in case of attack by a third party. From Moscow it goes to Riga, and thence to Angora, in order to explain the treaty to the Turkish headquarters. The head of the mission there makes bitter Anglophobe speeches, and in an interview states that it is the duty of the entire Muslim world to help the Turkish nationalists.

== February 28, 1921 ==
A treaty between the Bolshevik government of Russia and the amir is signed. British Foreign Secretary Lord Curzon states on one occasion that the Soviet government has offered the Afghans a subsidy of £100,000 a year.

== May 31, 1921 ==
Lord Chelmsford says in the House of Lords that he is confident the discussions at Kabul will have a salutary effect and produce valuable results. For a long time, however, they continue to hang fire. This is due to the leanings of the amir towards Russia and Turkey.

== June 5, 1921 ==
A son and heir is born to the amir.

== June 18, 1921 ==
The amir announces the completion of a code of criminal procedure with the effect, in his own words, of "making Afghanistan truly free and independent".

== November 17, 1921 ==
The Afghan envoy at Angora gives a banquet in honour of Fakhri Pasha, who is leaving for Kabul, at which speeches extolling Islamic union are made.

== November 22, 1921 ==
A treaty (amending the Treaty of Rawalpindi agreed originally in August 1919) between the Britain and Afghanistan is signed at Kabul, on the Afghan government giving written assurances that no Russian consulates will be permitted in the areas adjoining the Indian frontier. The treaty reaffirms Britain's recognition of Afghanistan's complete independence, and restores to the Afghans the privilege of importing munitions through India. A small area near the head of the Khyber Pass is transferred to Afghanistan, and Sir Henry Dobbs carries out the realignment of the frontier on crossing over to India on December 4. King George V sends a message of congratulation to the amir, who telegraphs a reply expressing deep appreciation of His Majesty's message, and hoping relations between the countries will grow closer.
