= 1915 in Afghanistan =

- Decades: 1890s; 1900s; 1910s; 1920s; 1930s
- See also: Other events of 1915; List of years in Afghanistan

The following lists events that happened during 1915 in Afghanistan.

== Incumbents ==
- Monarch – Habibullah Khan

== Events ==
Afghanistan passes through the year peaceably and the relations of the country with the Indian government are most cordial. Afghanistan presents in these respects a marked contrast to its neighbour, Persia. Both Persia and Afghanistan are nominally sovereign states, but in practice the British Raj is the supreme protecting power in Afghanistan, whereas in Persia, the paramount power is Russia rather than United Kingdom. The difference between the conditions prevailing in the two countries indicates the success of the British in gaining the confidence of a weak nation.
