= 1959 in Afghanistan =

- Decades: 1930s; 1940s; 1950s; 1960s; 1970s
- See also: Other events of 1959; List of years in Afghanistan

The following lists events that happened during 1959 in Afghanistan.

The budget estimates for September 23, 1958 – September 22, 1959 (1337–38 in the Afghan calendar), amount to a revenue of 1,455,122,000 Afghanis (including 521,192,000 Afghanis from foreign loans) and to an expenditure of 1,455,107,962 Afghanis. (The Afghani is worth about five U.S. cents.) Between the fiscal years 1955–56 and 1957–58 the amounts of Afghan exports rose from 1,527,000,000 Afghanis to 1,984,000,000 Afghanis, the main destinations being India, the U.S.S.R., the United States, the United Kingdom, and Poland.

== Incumbents ==
- Monarch – Mohammed Zahir Shah
- Prime Minister – Mohammed Daoud Khan

== February 1959 ==
The Afghan prime minister visits New Delhi.

== May 1959 ==
The Afghan prime minister is on an official visit in Moscow, where he confers with Nikita Khrushchev. An agreement on the expansion of Soviet-Afghan economic and technical cooperation is signed on May 28. Among other things, it provides for Soviet assistance in the construction of the Kushka-Herat-Kandahar motor road, more than 740 km long.

The reconstruction of the Kabul airport starts with Soviet help.

== August 24, 1959 ==
Speaking at Kabul on the Afghan National Day, King Mohammad Zahir Shah comments, traditionally, on the problem of Pashtunistan, "still awaiting a peaceful and just solution." Mohammad Daud Khan, the Prime Minister, explains to the correspondent of a Japanese press agency that the Pashtun problem has existed for a century and arose when part of Afghanistan was annexed to British India – the Pakistan of today.

== August, 1959 ==
Emancipation of women comes about with the abolition of the veil and the chadri (the shroud-like head-to-toe gown). This was a big event in the history of women in Afghanistan, and it was also an intentional part of the women's emancipation policy of the Daoud Government at that time. The step was carefully prepared by introducing women workers at the Radio Kabul in 1957, sending women delegates to the Asian Women's Conference in Kairo, and employing forty girls to the government pottery factory in 1958. When this was met with no riots, the government decided it was time for the very controversial step of unveiling. In August 1959 therefore, on the second day of the festival of Jeshyn, Queen Humaira Begum and Princess Bilqis appeared in the royal box at the military parade unveiled, alongside the Prime Minister's wife, Zamina Begum.

== September 1959 ==
Jawaharlal Nehru, the Indian prime minister, pays a return visit to Kabul.

Mohammad Naim, Afghan foreign minister, pays an official visit to Peking.

The Ariana Afghan Airlines extend their services from Kabul to Frankfurt, Germany, through Ankara, Turkey, and Prague, Czechoslovakia.
