= 1905 in Afghanistan =

- Decades: 1880s; 1890s; 1900s; 1910s; 1920s
- See also: Other events of 1905; List of years in Afghanistan

The following lists events that happened during 1905 in Afghanistan.

== Incumbents ==
- Monarch – Habibullah Khan

== January 1905 ==
Inayatullah Khan finishes his Indian visit, and on his return to Kabul expresses the greatest pleasure at the manner in which he was received.

== Early 1905 ==
The amir issues a proclamation inviting the Hazaras to return, and allowing them until October to do so. A large number of them accordingly return during the summer, and many of the leading supporters of Shir Ali who were exiles in India since his overthrow also seek and obtain permission to return to their homes.

== Early April 1905 ==
The special mission under Louis Dane in Kabul completes its work successfully and returns to India. The only visible result of its labours is the renewal with the present amir, Habibullah Khan, of the treaty formerly made with his father, with an increase of his annual subsidy from twelve to 1.8 million rupees, but the relations between him and Dane were throughout of the most cordial and intimate character, and all matters affecting the interests of the amir and the government of India were fully and freely discussed. It is thought in some British quarters that more might have been obtained from the amir, but it is seen as far better to accept what he was prepared to offer of his own free will than to obtain larger concessions from him by pressure.

Suggestions which have been put forward that there should be a British resident in Kabul, that British officers should be lent to organize the Afghan army, or that railways should be pushed forward into Afghanistan to connect its chief cities with British India, so that they might be at once garrisoned by British troops in case of threatened attack, are all open to the objection that any such steps would arouse the deepest resentment amongst the people. As it is, Britain secures the friendship and confidence of the amir, who shows the change in his relations with Britain by drawing the arrears of his subsidy, which he had declined to receive for some time, and employing the money to strengthen the defenses of his country. On the evening before the mission left Kabul its members were entertained at dinner by the amir, who had Dane on his right, whilst the other officers were placed between the chief men of his court. This was the first time that he or they had eaten with infidels.
