= 1912 in Afghanistan =

- Decades: 1890s; 1900s; 1910s; 1920s; 1930s
- See also: Other events of 1912; List of years in Afghanistan

The following lists events that happened during 1912 in Afghanistan.

== Incumbents ==
- Monarch – Habibullah Khan

== Events ==
The disturbances in the Khost country, which at one time threatened to expand into a general rising, are quieted by the removal of the governor, whose exactions and oppressions are believed to have been the real cause of the trouble, and the tribesmen who fled into British territory are induced to return to their homes. The amir continues his improvement of the main roads and strengthens the outposts on the Perso-Afghan border, and to the north of Herat as well as in Afghan Turkestan.
