= 1914 in Afghanistan =

- Decades: 1890s; 1900s; 1910s; 1920s; 1930s
- See also: Other events of 1914; List of years in Afghanistan

The following lists events that happened during 1914 in Afghanistan.

== Incumbents ==
- Monarch – Habibullah Khan

== Events ==
The relations between the government of India and the amir continued to be cordial.

Complaints were sent by Afghanis on the frontier to the amir against outlaws from British-held territory who have taken refuge in Khost. These representations were met by the amir and he issued stringent orders to his officers on the frontier to deal severely with offenders. It was reported that the Khost outlaws implicated in the complaints were arrested and sent to Kabul for trial.

In his reply to the viceroy's letter, announcing the outbreak of hostilities between the United Kingdom and Turkey, the amir expressed his deep regret at the step taken by the Turkish government, and declares his firm intention to maintain a strict neutrality, and added that he has issued a proclamation enjoining the same on all his subjects. He resisted pressures from Mahmud Beg Tarzi, Amānullāh (Habibullah's third son, who had married Soraya, a daughter of Tarzi), and others to enter World War I on the side of the Central Powers.
