= 1928 in Afghanistan =

- Decades: 1900s; 1910s; 1920s; 1930s; 1940s
- See also: Other events of 1928; List of years in Afghanistan

The following lists events that happened during 1928 in Afghanistan.

== Incumbents ==
- Monarch – Amanullah Khan
- Prime Minister – Shir Ahmad

== January 8 ==
Having completed their stay in Egypt, the king and queen arrive in Rome. Two state banquets are here given in the king's honour, and he also has an interview with the pope. While in Italy he visits Milan and a number of other cities, paying special attention to engineering and motor works. From Italy he goes through the Riviera to Paris, where he is officially received by the president of the republic. Here, as elsewhere, the official visit is succeeded by a much longer unofficial stay. In the course of February visits are paid to Belgium, Switzerland, and Germany, and on March 13 the royal party crosses over to London, where the crowd gives them an enthusiastic welcome. State banquets are given in the king's honour at Buckingham Palace, the Guildhall, and the Foreign Office. On March 23 he goes with Queen Souriyah to Oxford, where a brother of the queen is an undergraduate, and receives there the degree of Doctor of Civil Law.

== February 17 ==
On February 17, 11 people were shot dead by unknown assailants in Abu Shakir, a village in Kabul. (Now Wazir Akbar Khan) police speculated that the attackers were Arab militants belonging to Jund Al Farooq, the armed wing of the Ansar Al Farooq anti-Shia group. The motive of the attack is probably because the siege of Jund Al Farooq controlled village of Bani Khalid, (Now Sheerpur) near Abu Shakir, by the Afghani Army.

== February 18 ==
On February 18, 23 policemen were shot dead by Jund Al Farooq.

In the evening, 14 Pashtuns were killed by Jund Al Farooq. This angered many Afghans and led to the killing of 43 Arabs. It was also reported that Pashtun militants entered the Jund Al Farooq stronghold of Bani Khalid and massacred 56 Arab residents of the village.

By the end of the day, 61 Arabs and 17 Pashtuns were killed. Jund Al Farooq's leader Mohammad Ahmad was also killed.

== February 19 ==
On February 19, Mohammad Ahmad's brother Khalid took control over Jund Al Farooq. By this time, Pashtun militias controlled 2/3 of Bani Khalid.

Khalid's son Omar was killed as Pashtun militias backed by the Afghani Army sieged Jund Al Farooq controlled areas in the village.

By noon, Jund Al Farooq withdrew from the village, however, clashes still occurred between local Arabs and Pashtuns.

By the end of the day, 3 Arabs and 16 Pashtuns were killed.

== April 5 ==
The king leaves England for the East of Europe. On his way he finds it necessary to stay in Berlin to undergo an operation for tonsillitis. While in Germany he is presented by the German government with a specially upholstered Junkers aeroplane, and discusses with Professor Junkers the subject of an airline between Afghanistan and Persia. From Berlin the king and queen proceed to Warsaw (April 29), and thence two days later to Moscow, where they receive a royal welcome in spite of the anti-royalist professions of their hosts. While in Russia they pay a visit to Leningrad, where they witness the Baltic Fleet manoeuvres at Kronstadt. The next country to be visited is Turkey, which King Amanullah regards with peculiar affection. At a banquet given in his honour at Angora on May 20, President Mustafa Kemal Pasha lays stress on the close ties between the Afghan and Turkish peoples, and King Amanullah replies with a speech expressing admiration of the work accomplished by the president. From Angora the royal party proceeds to Constantinople, and after spending a few days there sail in a Turkish steamer to Batum, with an escort of Turkish and Russian warships. On June 9 they arrive at Tehran, where they are greeted by the shah and his son the valiahd in the presence of large crowds. On June 16 they leave Tehran for Meshed by motor car, and thence journey via Herat, Farah, Kandahar, Mukur, and Ghazni partly by car and partly by aeroplane to Kabul, where they arrive on July 1, after an absence of nearly seven months. A huge crowd has gathered from all parts of the country to welcome them, and their return is made the occasion for great festivities.

== April ==
An agreement is concluded between Afghanistan and Russia for an air service between Kabul and Tashkent.

== May 25 ==
A close treaty of friendship and security, to be valid in the first instance for ten years, is concluded between Afghanistan and Turkey.

== June ==
A pretender to the throne, who claims that he is a grandson of the amir Mohammad Yakub, appears in Kabul, but he is soon discovered to be an impostor and secures no following. Other than this, the country has remained perfectly peaceful during the absence of the king.

== July ==
Shortly after the king's return, complaints reach his ear that he has spent on his tour money which could ill be spared from the public treasury. He silences such murmurings by pointing out that he has brought back presents far outweighing in value the expense of the tour. He can also boast truly that he has made Afghanistan known to the world as a country with great potentialities, and one whose friendship is worth cultivating. Among the definite results of his trip he is able to announce the impending conclusion of treaties with thirteen states, agreements with French and German companies to undertake a survey preparatory to the construction of a railroad linking Kabul, Kandahar, Herat, and Kushk, and the acquisition of over 50,000 rifles, over 100 cannon, six model machine guns, six tanks, and five armoured cars. The bulk of this armament, however, does not reach Afghanistan within the year. King Amanullah's tour has impressed on him more strongly than ever the advantages of European civilization. Contact with the great personages of the West has put a keen edge upon his reforming zeal, and he is determined to follow as closely as possible in the footsteps of his distinguished co-religionist, Mustafa Kemal of Turkey. Dazzled by the latter's success, he overlooks the fact that there is a fundamental difference between Turkey and Afghanistan: the Turks are a fairly homogeneous people with a long tradition of obedience to a central authority, whereas the Afghans are a conglomeration of diverse tribes accustomed to a certain measure of autonomy and attached to their local customs. He is advised by the foreigners at his court and the most prudent of his counsellors to proceed slowly with his reforms, but in his eagerness to Westernize the country he resolves to make the pace even more rapidly than his Turkish confrère. The first fruits of the tour are made apparent to their subjects a few days after their return when the queen sits through a state banquet without the purdah or religious veil. The mullahs are greatly scandalized and remonstrate with the king. He points out to them that the working women in the villages do not wear the purdah, and bids them see to their own flocks. They are nonplussed for the moment, but are nevertheless reconciled to the king's innovations.

== August ==
A loya jirga (assembly of the people) is held at Paghman, and discusses a number of the reforms proposed by the king. It is decided among other things to replace the Council of State with a National Assembly of 150 members selected from the Grand Assembly for three years, and to which government servants shall be ineligible; that the period of compulsory military service shall be extended from two to three years and all exemptions abolished; that preaching certificates shall be introduced for Afghan mullahs and that mullahs from neighbouring countries shall be excluded; and that persons entering the government service in future shall not have more than one wife. It is also resolved that Afghanistan shall adopt a tricoloured flag in place of the present black flag, which is said to be an emblem of mourning, not fitting for Afghanistan since she achieved her independence. The king also desires to prohibit the marriage of youths before 22 and girls before 18, but he cannot persuade the assembly to agree to this. Hardly is the jirga over when a number of mullahs begin to preach sedition among the people. The king promptly arrests the ringleaders, and on October 30 the chief kadi of Kabul and three other mullahs are executed. The king meanwhile proceeds with his scheme of reforms. He has already decreed that education up to a certain point shall be compulsory for all and free for the poor. By the end of October several roads and bridges are being constructed, telegraphs and telephones are working between Kabul and the chief towns, and college buildings are being erected in Kabul and Kandahar. For the improvement of the Army, 65 officers have gone to Russia, France, and Italy, and 20 more are to go to England, while a Staff College is to be opened at Khurd Zabitan. For the furtherance of the king's various schemes numerous foreigners are invited to the country. The king is desirous to introduce the system of cabinet government, but Shir Ahmad Khan, to whom he entrusted the task, is unable to form a cabinet, and he has, as he says, to be his own prime minister.

== End of November ==
The reforming activities of the king are brought to a sudden stop by the revolt of the Shinwari, a powerful tribe in eastern Afghanistan, much under the influence of the mullah of Chaknaur. They assemble in force in the neighbourhood of Jalalabad, and besiege that city. The king finds that in the hour of need he cannot rely upon his army, which is disaffected because its pay is in arrears. He therefore, after some indecisive fighting, begins to parley with the rebels in order to induce them to lay down their arms. A truce of ten days is declared early in December, during which the tribesmen consider the king's proposals. As he does not consent to abandon his reforms, they again take up arms at the end of the truce. At the same time (December 17) other tribesmen, acting apparently without any concert with the Shinwari, gather in force near Kabul. They are led by a Tajik brigand named Habibullah, but familiarly known as Bacha-i-Saqao or "son of the water-carrier," and are joined by numbers of disaffected persons, both soldiers and others, from Kabul itself. Kabul is reduced to a state of siege, and the king and queen judge it prudent to retire within the Arg, the fortified part of the palace. Although the rebels disclaim any hostility to the members of the British legation, the legation buildings, which are situated outside of the town in the zone of fighting, suffer damage from stray shots. The position being regarded as dangerous, five British aeroplanes on December 23 fly across from Peshawar and take off all the women and children to the number of about a dozen. Between that date and the end of the year the women and children from the other legations are rescued in a similar manner. The gallantry of the British airmen makes a great impression throughout Europe. The Russian women and children are conveyed northwards by Russian aeroplanes.

== December 25 ==
Bacha-i-Saqao suddenly retires with his troops to the mountains, and the king considers himself out of danger; the queen has already made her escape to Kandahar. His last act in the year is to reward his troops at Kabul with two months' pay and to increase the pay of his bodyguard from 14 to 20 rupees a month. When the new year opens, the king is still retaining a precarious hold upon the throne at Kabul. On the east the Shinwari and other tribes are at Jalalabad debating whether to advance on Kabul or not. For the moment they are parleying with the king's brother-in-law and minister, Ali Ahmad Jan, whose forces, however, are quite insufficient to keep them in check. From the north, Kabul is threatened by Bacha-i-Saqao and his army; though they were beaten off they are still encamped in force about twenty miles (32 km) away.

== 1928 ==
The first women's organisation in Afghanistan, the Anjuman-i Himayat-i-Niswan, is founded by Queen Soraya Tarzi.
