= 1909 in Afghanistan =

- Decades: 1880s; 1890s; 1900s; 1910s; 1920s
- See also: Other events of 1909; List of years in Afghanistan

The following lists events that happened during 1909 in Afghanistan.

In order to secure greater tranquility on the frontier, the special governor, Hakim Taniwal, was sent to the Khost Valley with a force of cavalry and infantry. He held a durbar (Imperial Assemblage) of the tribesmen at which he read a firman from the amir, and encouraged them to cease their feuds between themselves and prevent raids into British territory. They promised obedience. A telephone system is installed in various districts in order to ensure speedy communication between the frontier and Kabul.

== Incumbents ==
- Monarch – Habibullah Khan

== March 1909 ==
A plot against the life of the amir and his brother Nasrullah Khan is said to have been discovered from information given by the tutor of the heir. It was promptly suppressed by the "vigorous action" taken by the amir. But there was no public inquiry or trial, and no other information was recorded.
