= 1964 in Afghanistan =

- Decades: 1940s; 1950s; 1960s; 1970s; 1980s
- See also: Other events of 1964; List of years in Afghanistan

The following lists events that happened during 1964 in Afghanistan.

== Afghanistan ==
- Monarch – Mohammed Zahir Shah
- Prime Minister – Mohammad Yusuf

== July 1, 1964 ==
Field Marshal Mohammad Ayub Khan, president of Pakistan, visits Kabul briefly where he meets with King Mohammad Zahir. For the first time in several years relations between Afghanistan and Pakistan are relatively amicable following the decision of the government of Afghanistan to deal with the Pakhtunistan dispute only through diplomatic negotiations and to carry on normal relations with Pakistan in other respects. Afghanistan does not, however, join the Istanbul Pact drawn up in July between Pakistan, Iran, and Turkey to foster economic cooperation. Observers voice the belief that Afghanistan's desire to maintain a strictly neutral policy is the basis of the decision not to join, since all three of the other countries are members of pro-Western alliances.

== September 9, 1964 ==
The Grand Council (loya jirga) is convened to discuss and ratify a new constitution; the latter event takes place on September 19. The House of the People is to have 216 elected members, and the House of the Elders is to have 84 members, one-third elected by the people, one-third appointed by the king, and one-third elected indirectly by new provincial assemblies. Under the terms of the new constitution no members of the royal family may become Prime Minister or hold any other ministerial portfolio; neither may a member of the royal family become a member of the loya jirga, or Chief Justice of the Supreme Court. This is a complete reversal of the situation that prevailed until 1963 when Mohammad Yusuf became the first Afghan Prime Minister not of royal blood. On the other hand, the constitution also provides that only descendants of Mohammad Nadir Shah, father of the present king, may ascend the throne. Democratic reforms in the new constitution include the guaranteeing of such individual liberties as the right of free trial in all criminal cases, freedom of speech, freedom of the press, and the right to form political parties.

== September 1964 ==
The Salang Highway is opened, linking Kandahar in south Afghanistan and Kabul with Kushka, the southernmost town of the Soviet Union on the 1,900-km border between the U.S.S.R. and Afghanistan. This highway provides the first motor access through the mountains of the Hindu Kush to connect the northern towns of Afghanistan with the capital and the south. Built by Soviet engineers and with Soviet aid, the highway took more than four years to complete and cost about $38 million, which is to be repaid by Afghanistan. Its most spectacular feature is a tunnel 2,670 m long. In the meantime, the U.S. Agency for International Development authorized a loan of $7.7 million for the construction of an all-weather highway from Herat to Islam Qala on the Iranian border, and the Soviet Union signed an agreement to provide the equivalent of £10.5 million for another highway in northern Afghanistan.

== End of 1964 ==
Afghanistan's new progressive outlook is recognized when it receives a credit of $3.5 million from the International Development Association, the first ever granted to Afghanistan by that organization. Seven secondary vocational schools are created with the funds.
