= 1906 in Afghanistan =

- Decades: 1880s; 1890s; 1900s; 1910s; 1920s
- See also: Other events of 1906; List of years in Afghanistan

The following lists events that happened during 1906 in Afghanistan.

There are no internal disturbances and no disputes with foreign neighbours during the year. Even the usual rumours of differences and intrigues within the royal family have ceased. All its members are apparently on excellent terms.

== Incumbents ==
- Monarch – Habibullah Khan

== Summer 1906 ==
The amir makes a three months' tour of inspection through Jalalabad and the adjoining districts, and during his absence Sardar Nasrullah Khan acts as governor of Kabul with considerable success.

== September 15, 1906 ==
The relations between the amir and the government of India having continued to be most friendly, the amir holds a great durbar at Kabul, in which he informs his chiefs of the viceroy's invitation to him to visit India, and of his acceptance of it. He explains that the visit will be purely one of friendship and courtesy, all political questions having been finally settled by the treaty of 1905. By the close of the year the amir, with his escort and a large following of chiefs, has reached the frontier, and his visit passes off most satisfactorily.
