= 1913 in Afghanistan =

- Decades: 1890s; 1900s; 1910s; 1920s; 1930s
- See also: Other events of 1913; List of years in Afghanistan

The following lists events that happened during 1913 in Afghanistan.

== Incumbents ==
- Monarch – Habibullah Khan

== Early 1913 ==
In the Khost Valley the Mangals and Jadrans were in a dispute, and the leading chief of the Jadrans had to return several hundred rifles to the amir as his tribesmen refused to fulfill their agreement to render military service.

The tribes were never subdued, and in peace talks of the valley, which ended the operations of the Afghan expedition in 1912, they dictated the terms. The result was troubling to the British districts neighboring the valley because the outlaws who carried out the raids were safe when they made their escape into Khost.

On other parts of the frontier the amir carried out his agreement to remove all outlaws from a distance of fifty miles from the frontier, but in Khost his orders are ineffective.

== October 1913 ==
A new conspiracy against the amir was discovered at Kabul, led by Sardar Mohammad Yunus Khan, the grandson of Sardar Shah Khan, who had rebelled against the amir Abdur Rahman Khan in the later 1880s.

He was allowed by the amir to return and take up his residence in Kabul. On the discovery of the conspiracy the amir held a family durbar (an Afghan court session) at which he reproached Yunus for his ingratitude and condemned him to death. The amir then retired and Yunus is executed, being first stoned and then stabbed to death. Several of his accomplices are executed afterwards.
