= 1922 in Afghanistan =

- Decades: 1900s; 1910s; 1920s; 1930s; 1940s
- See also: Other events of 1922; List of years in Afghanistan

The following lists events that happened during 1922 in Afghanistan.

The amir personally sets a high standard of devotion to duty, which is followed by his civil service. He encourages the sending of Afghan youths abroad to be educated. During the year a number of telegraph and telephone lines are laid down or commenced, e.g., from Landi Khana to Kabul, and from Kabul to Peshawar; while young Afghans are trained for telegraph work at Karachi.

== Incumbents ==
- Monarch – Amanullah Khan

== February 1922 ==
An Afghan mission arrives in Ankara with an autograph letter from the amir expressing the warmest sentiments towards the Turkish government, and stating that he urged the British government to abstain from assisting the Greeks. Towards Russia Afghan sentiment is at first rather unfriendly.

== Beginning of March 1922 ==
Maj. Francis Humphrys reaches Kabul as British minister. At about the same time Sardar Abdul Hadi Khan arrives in London as Afghan minister to the Court of St. James. This interchange of ambassadors sets the seal upon the new relationship between the two countries. In an interview to The Times Hadi Khan says he thinks the treaty will strengthen trade relations between Afghanistan and India; he also says that his people are beginning to be better disposed towards England.

== Early summer 1922 ==
Many of the large number of refugees from Turkestan who are hostile to the Soviet government rally to the flag of Enver Pasha when on behalf of the Bokhara government he makes war on Russia. But the successes of the Russian arms soon cause a marked change of sentiment in Afghanistan. On June 17 there appears in the Ittihad-i-Mashriqi of Jalalabad an obviously inspired article strongly disapproving of the anti-Bolshevik insurrection in Turkestan and advocating relations of disinterested friendship all round. This policy is energetically pursued by Mohammad Wali Khan, who in July, on his return from his world diplomatic mission, becomes foreign minister in succession to Sardar Mahmud Beg Tarzi. On August 15 he issues a statement that he regards the disturbances in Bokhara as a purely internal affair, the Russo-Afghan treaty of last year having agreed to recognize the independence of Bokhara and Khiva.

== August 16–25, 1922 ==
Festivities are held at Paghman to celebrate the anniversary of Afghan independence. The amir on this occasion becomes reconciled with his elder brother, Inayatullah Khan. A rumour spread that he had been murdered, and he had to hasten to Kabul to show himself. He takes the opportunity of making a speech in which he lays stress on the importance of developing home industries, of dispensing with foreign officials, and of a strong army to preserve the national independence. Subject to these conditions the amir shows himself anxious to modernize the country. He welcomes the presence of all kinds of foreign missions. Thus on October 13 Raymond Poincaré demands from the French chamber credits for the creation of a French legation in Afghanistan, the two governments having agreed to receive permanent diplomatic missions.

== October 1922 ==
During the Near Eastern crisis Afghanistan remains outwardly calm, but that it has been profoundly impressed by the success of Turkey is shown a couple of months later when the Times of India publishes the terms of a new treaty between Afghanistan and Angora. In this document Afghanistan acknowledges Turkey as its "suzerain," i.e., as heir to the privileges of the caliphate, and recognizes the independence of Bokhara and Khiva. The chief object of the treaty is to institute a defensive alliance between the two countries, commercial and financial arrangements being left to a separate protocol. Turkey also undertakes to send teachers and military officers to remain in Afghanistan for a period of five years.

== Early November 1922 ==
The British commercial mission is in Kabul to arrange details of a trade convention on the lines laid down in the Anglo-Afghan treaty.
