= 1896 in Afghanistan =

- Decades: 1870s; 1880s; 1890s; 1900s; 1910s
- See also: Other events of 1896; List of years in Afghanistan

Related to 1896 in Afghanistan: Negotiations are going on between the Indian government and the amir tending to the appointment of a joint commission for determining the last 100 miles (160 km) of Indo-Afghan frontier yet unsettled, from Landi Kotal in the Khyber to Nawar Kotal on the Kunar River.

Nasrullah Khan is received in a most cordial manner on his return from his visit to England. There are great rejoicings for two or three weeks, but then he gradually drops out of notice. His brother, Habibullah Khan, on the other hand, is immensely popular with everybody, and is in high favour with the amir.

== Incumbents ==
- Monarch – Abdur Rahman Khan

== Events ==
=== Early 1896 ===
Conclusion of the Kafiristan campaign. The Afghans have captured twenty-five forts at an admitted loss of 1,500 killed and wounded. In some of the valleys, however, the Kafirs still hold out, although many of the chiefs submit to the amir at the beginning of February. Soon after hostilities are resumed on the southern and eastern sides of Kafiristan, and nearly all the fertile portions are taken by the Afghan forces. In May the troops are ordered into the more inaccessible northwestern part, so as to complete the subjugation of the country. The amir treats the conquered people with leniency. Orders are issued forbidding slave traffic in Kafirs, for it was alleged that after the victories in the Bashgal Valley at the beginning of the year certain captives were reduced to an atrocious form of slavery. The amir also gives orders to the Afghan officers to treat the Kafirs kindly, and not seek to convert them by force to Islam.

=== Summer 1896 ===
The amir sends a force of militia to occupy the Mittai Valley in Bajaur, where the clans previously received a demand for taxes. The Khan of Nawagai, who rendered excellent service in the Chitral expedition, is alarmed and complains to the government of India. The amir, after some hesitation, acknowledges his obligations under the Durand Line Agreement, but at the end of the year the Afghan outpost still remains at Mittai.

=== October 1896 ===
On the Pamir Mountains frontier the transfer of the Darwaz district of Bukhara to the Afghans up to the Amu Darya, as agreed upon between Russia and Britain, is completed. It is stated that Russia is making movements in the direction of Herat, and intends not only to extend the railway from Merv into the Kushk Valley, but also to build a line from Charjui along the Oxus to Karki, close to the Afghan frontier.

=== December 1896 ===
A slight collision takes place between the forces of the Khan of Nawagai, whose territory was threatened by the Afghans at Mittai, and the Khan of Pashat, and the Afghan force moves down the Kunar River about fifteen miles (24 km) from Asmar to protect their communications with Jalalabad, but nothing more serious happens, and the final solution of the frontier question is in a fair way of settlement. The arrangements for the demarcation of the boundary between British Baluchistan and Persia from Koh-i-Malik Siah on the north, to a point near Jalk, are concluded, and pillars are to be set up in the desert marking the frontier.

== See also ==
- History of Afghanistan
