= 1902 in Afghanistan =

- Decades: 1880s; 1890s; 1900s; 1910s; 1920s
- See also: Other events of 1902; List of years in Afghanistan

The following lists events that happened during 1902 in Afghanistan.

The first year of Habibullah Khan's reign passes without any internal disturbance, or event of importance. Gen. Mir Attar Khan, who was imprisoned by the late amir, is released and reinstated in his old post of commander-in-chief, or rather of Naib, or deputy commander-in-chief, for this is the title by which the successors of the late Gen. Gholam Haidar Khan in the command of the Army have been designated. The amir is said to be reluctant to confer the full appointment on anyone, and there is a belief current that he is likely to keep it for Yahya Khan, whose daughter, whom he lately married, has become his favourite wife. Yahya Khan is at present in great favour with the amir, and his position in Kabul not unnaturally excites the jealousy both of the amir's own relatives and of the leading chiefs and sardars. There are rumours of intrigues in favour of the amir's youngest half-brother, Mohammad Omar, but they seem to die away, and towards the end of the year Mohammad Omar is reported to be in delicate health. There are also rumours that the amir's full brother, Nasrullah Khan, has fallen into disgrace, and even that he has been imprisoned. These are, as usual, followed by complete denials, and assurances that the best feeling exists between the two brothers.

The relations of Habibullah Khan with the British government are reportedly of the most friendly nature throughout the year, and he orders his officers on the frontier to prevent all outlaws from British territory from entering Afghanistan. He is reported to have said in durbar that he found by experience that a mild rule was unsuited to the Afghans, and that he has consequently ordered the revival of his father's Secret Intelligence Department. But although the domestic history of Afghanistan during 1902 is comparatively colourless, a very important move is made or attempted by Russia in what may be called its foreign policy. The Russian government suggests to the British government that whilst it fully recognizes the existing agreement between the two countries by which it is precluded from direct diplomatic intercourse with Afghanistan, it would be of the greatest convenience if the Russian and Afghan officials on the frontier were allowed to communicate direct with one another for commercial purposes only. To this proposal the British foreign secretary, Lord Lansdowne, answers that before expressing any opinion on it he would like to know exactly what it means. As to what takes place since, no information is given to the public, except that correspondence is ongoing. But if there is any doubt of the true meaning of the Russian proposals this is removed by the Russian press, which declares openly that the time has come that the agreement excluding Russia from Afghanistan should be set aside and that Russia should insist on as full commercial and political intercourse with that country as is enjoyed by England itself.

== Incumbents ==
- Monarch – Habibullah Khan

== Early 1902 ==
The Hadda mullah, Najibuddin, visits Kabul and is received by the amir with great favour and distinction. It is first reported that the amir is completely under his influence; then it is said that he is virtually a prisoner, and that the amir never visits him. Towards the end of the year he is sent back to his own country, with an allowance of Rs. 16,000 a year.

== October 1902 ==
Habibullah holds a great durbar to commemorate the anniversary of his accession, and releases 8,000 prisoners.
