= 1879 in Afghanistan =

- Decades: 1850s; 1860s; 1870s; 1880s; 1890s
- See also: Other events of 1879; List of years in Afghanistan

The following lists events from 1879 in Afghanistan.

== Incumbents ==
- Monarch – Sher Ali Khan (until February 21), Ayub Khan (starting October 12)

== Events ==
=== February ===
February 21: Amir Sher Ali Khan dies in Mazar-i-Sharif, leaving the throne to his son, Mohammad Yaqub Khan.

=== May ===
May 26: Afghan and British leaders sign the Treaty of Gandamak during the Second Anglo-Afghan War. The treaty cedes parts of the Afghan frontier to Britain.

September

September 3: a British envoy led by Sir Louis Cavagnari are attacked and massacred by Afghan forces

=== October ===
October 12: Mohammad Yaqub Khan abdicates and takes refuge in the British camp near Kabul.

== See also ==
- History of Afghanistan
