= 1926 in Afghanistan =

- Decades: 1900s; 1910s; 1920s; 1930s; 1940s
- See also: Other events of 1926; List of years in Afghanistan

The following lists events that happened during 1926 in Afghanistan.

== Incumbents ==
- Emir - Amanullah Khan
- King - Amanullah Khan

== Events ==
- Afghanistan suffers during the year from the effects of the great Khost rebellion of the previous year, and little progress is made in developing the country.
- Amanullah declares the creation of The Sublime State of Afghanistan, transforming the country from an Emirate into a Kingdom.
- King Amanullah launches a series of modernization plans and attempts to limit the power of the Loya Jirga, the National Council.
- A treaty of neutrality and mutual nonaggression between Afghanistan and the Soviet Union is concluded in August. The first clause in the treaty provides for neutrality in the event of an armed conflict between either of the parties with a third power, while in another clause each party agrees not to permit in its territory the activities of elements having for their object hostile action against the other party to the treaty.
- The Swedish citizen Aurora Nilsson arrives with her Afghan spouse Asim Khan, and becomes a royal adviser to the queen and arouses a lot of attention in contemporary Kabul.

== Births ==
- Prince Ehsanullah
- Sibghatullah Mojaddedi
- Abdul Rahim Hatif
- Abdul Wahed Sarabi
