= Abdul Wahab Khan Tarzi =

Abdul Wahab Khan Tarzi (24 November 1903 – 20 January 1994) was an Afghan civil servant. He was born in Damascus in November 1903, and was educated at Oxford University. From 1925 to 1928, he served as director general of the Protocol Branch. In 1928, Abdul Wahab Tarzi became the acting foreign minister. On January 26, 1928, he was given the high prestige of officer, with the Order of the Legion of Honour of France. In 1929, Tarzi married Khadija, a daughter of Amir Habibullah Khan. She died in 1995.

Abdul Wahab Khan Tarzi would spend most of the rest of his career as a professor, mainly in Istanbul University from 1939 to 1952.

== See also ==
- Tarzi
