= 1963 in Afghanistan =

- Decades: 1940s; 1950s; 1960s; 1970s; 1980s
- See also: Other events of 1963; List of years in Afghanistan

The following lists events that happened during 1963 in Afghanistan.

Both the United States and the Soviet Union continued their road-building projects in Afghanistan. The U.S. grades and paves the road from Kabul to Peshawar (Pakistan) and is building another road, costing more than $30,000,000, from Kabul to Kandahar and thence to the Pakistan border. The Soviets are building a tunnel to connect the modern road from the Oxus river (their frontier with Afghanistan) to Kabul, at an estimated cost of $40,000,000.

== Incumbents ==
- Monarch – Mohammed Zahir Shah
- Prime Minister – Mohammed Daoud Khan (until 10 March), Mohammad Yusuf (starting 10 March)

== February 25, 1963 ==
A Soviet-Afghan trade protocol is signed in Moscow, pursuant to which Afghanistan is to export wool, cotton, dried and fresh fruits, and oilseeds in exchange for motor vehicles, rolled steel, oil products, and consumer goods.

== March 1963 ==
For the first time in Afghan history, a new administration is formed with no members of the royal family in the cabinet, when Sardar (Prince) Mohammad Daud Khan resigns and a commoner, Mohammad Yusuf, is appointed to the prime ministership. The new prime minister announces his cabinet on March 13, 1963; he makes several shifts within the cabinet, taking charge of external affairs, appointing new first and second deputy premiers, and changing other posts. His most controversial appointment is the designation of Gen. Mohammad Khan, who was dismissed as governor of Kandahar by a previous cabinet, as defense minister. The new prime minister undertakes serious currency reform, abrogating multiple rates which priced the Afghani to the U.S. dollar at anything from 20 to 57, while the free market rate was near 50.7. The new, uniform rate establishes 45 Afghanis to the dollar for all transactions. The reform is supported by the International Monetary Fund, which assigns Afghanistan a drawing fund of $5,625,000 to support Afghan foreign exchange reserves during the transition period.

== April 26, 1963 ==
An announcement is made that the U.S. Agency for International Development (AID) has granted Afghanistan a loan of $2,652,000 for the purchase of three U.S. passenger aircraft to be used by Ariana Afghan Airlines.

== Week of May 11, 1963 ==
Sarvepalli Radhakrishnan, the president of India, visits Kabul.

== June 4, 1963 ==
The prime minister receives a unanimous vote of confidence from the National Assembly. During the same month a constitutional commission, aided by the French expert Louis Phojean, enters the final phases of drafting a new constitution.

== Late July 1963 ==
In pursuance of better relations, the Afghan-Pakistan frontier is reopened, largely through the peace efforts of the Shah of Iran.

== Early September 1963 ==
King Mohammad Zahir Shah and his queen pay their first state visit to Washington, D.C.; on September 7 the king and U.S. Pres. John F. Kennedy issue a joint statement which places special emphasis on the Afghan policy of nonalignment.
