= 1907 in Afghanistan =

- Decades: 1880s; 1890s; 1900s; 1910s; 1920s
- See also: Other events of 1907; List of years in Afghanistan

The following lists events that happened during 1907 in Afghanistan.

== Incumbents ==
- Monarch – Habibullah Khan

== January 2, 1907 ==
On his visit to British India as guest of the viceroy (Gilbert Elliot-Murray-Kynynmound, 1st Earl of Minto), the amir reaches Landi Kotal and, on January 28, Calcutta, after witnessing a grand review of some 30,000 troops at Agra, with which he is said to have been much impressed. From Calcutta he proceeds to Bombay, where he arrives on February 12. He leaves by sea on February 25 for Karachi, landing on the 27th, and leaves Peshawar on his return home on March 7. The arrangement that no political questions should be discussed was strictly adhered to; the visit was purely for the exchange of personal courtesies and for enabling the amir to gain as great a general knowledge of India as was possible in so short a time. He appears to have been most genuinely pleased with his reception, but on his return to Afghanistan the more fanatical of his subjects express great dissatisfaction at his eating with Europeans. Nothing however comes of this, and if any outward signs of it are shown they are speedily suppressed.

== August 31, 1907 ==
An Anglo-Russian convention is signed, which relates to Afghanistan as follows:

- The British government disclaims any intention of changing the political position in Afghanistan, and undertakes neither to take measures in Afghanistan, nor to encourage Afghanistan to take measures, threatening Russia. The Russian government recognizes Afghanistan as outside the Russian sphere of influence, and agrees to act in all political relations with Afghanistan through the British government, and it also undertakes to send no agents to Afghanistan.
- Britain adheres to the provisions of the treaty of Kabul of March 21, 1905, and undertakes not to annex or to occupy, contrary to the said treaty, any part of Afghanistan, or to intervene in the internal administration. The reservation is made that the amir shall fulfil the engagements contracted by him in the aforementioned treaty.
- Russian and Afghan officials especially appointed for that purpose on the frontier, or in the frontier provinces, may enter into direct relations in order to settle local questions of a non-political character.
- Russia and Britain declare that they recognize the principle of equality of treatment for commerce, and agree that all facilities acquired already or in the future for British and Anglo-Indian commerce and merchants shall be equally applied to Russian commerce and merchants.
- These arrangements are not to come into force until Britain has notified to Russia the amir's assent to them. The general effect is merely to maintain the status quo; it is to the advantage of England that Russia shall definitely renounce all right to treat directly with Afghanistan, while on the other hand the grant of commercial equality is a decided gain to Russia.
