= 1955 in Afghanistan =

- Decades: 1930s; 1940s; 1950s; 1960s; 1970s
- See also: Other events of 1955; List of years in Afghanistan

The following lists events that happened during 1955 in Afghanistan.

Pakistan-Afghan relations remain marred by the continued support given by the Kabul government to the Pashtun (or Pakhtun) people of the former North-West Frontier Province of Pakistan in their demand for self-determination. The Kabul government does not recognize the 1893 Durand Line as the Afghan-Pakistani international frontier.

== Incumbents ==
- Monarch – Mohammed Zahir Shah
- Prime Minister – Mohammed Daoud Khan

== Tribal revolt (unknown date) ==
A tribal revolt occurred near Kabul and was easily crushed by the Afghan army, which had been bolstered by Soviet tanks and air-planes by this time. This was the last tribal revolt to take place in the Kingdom of Afghanistan.

== Anti-Pakistan radio speech (29 March) ==
The prime minister broadcasts a speech over Kabul radio which amounts to open incitement of the Afghan people against Pakistan. This speech is followed in the course of the next two days by demonstrations in Kabul, Kandahar, and Jalalabad during which Pakistani missions are wrecked and looted and Pakistani flags are pulled down. The government of Pakistan is, therefore, compelled to close its diplomatic and consular missions and withdraw their staffs. A "general mobilization" of Afghan armed forces is ordered in Kabul at the beginning of May, in reply to which Gen. Mohammad Ayub Khan, Pakistani Minister of Defense and Commander-in-Chief, comments that if any inroads are made into Pakistan territory Afghanistan will be taught a lesson to be remembered for life. Attik Khan Rafik, Afghan minister to Karachi, is recalled to Kabul. Mikhail V. Degtyar, Soviet ambassador to Kabul, is reported to have promised Afghanistan "total military aid" in the event of Pakistani aggression. This acute tension results in offers of mediation by Islamic powers, but Gen. Iskandar Mirza, Pakistani Minister of the Interior, makes it clear that his country will maintain the Durand Line. On June 30, when opening the session of the Afghan National Assembly, King Zahir pledges his country's support for the idea of an autonomous Pashtunistan.

== Rehoisting the Pakistani flag (13 September) ==
The Afghan foreign minister, Mohammad Naim Khan, rehoists the Pakistan flag on the Pakistani embassy in Kabul with full ceremonial honours and in the presence of Col. A. S. B. Shah, the Pakistani ambassador. Chaudhry Mohammad Ali, the Pakistani premier, says on September 15, in the Constituent Assembly, that relations between the two countries have taken a turn for the better. This improvement, however, does not continue for long. On September 30, the Pakistani Constituent Assembly passes a bill merging western Pakistan into a single province, and the Afghan government protests against this violation of the rights and wishes of the Pashtun people. Attik Khan Rafik is again recalled from Karachi (October).

== Tribal border incursion into Pakistan (Beginning of November) ==
A few thousand armed Afghan tribesmen enter Pakistan along a 160-km stretch of frontier about 480 km northeast of Quetta. A Pakistani army spokesman says that militarily there is no threat in the presence of these tribesmen. He adds, however, that there is evidence that this so-called invasion was inspired by Kabul with the moral and material support of the Soviet Union and India. The Afghan ambassador to Cairo, Salaheddin Salgooky, declares that his country will seek Soviet or Czechoslovak arms if the West fails to supply them.

== Strengthening Soviet-Afghan Relations (18 December) ==
During the visit to Kabul of Nikolai Bulganin, the Soviet premier, and Nikita Khrushchev, first secretary of the Communist Party of the Soviet Union, a protocol is signed extending for ten years the Soviet-Afghan treaty of neutrality and nonaggression of 1931. On the same day it is announced that the USSR grants to Afghanistan a 30-year credit of $100,000,000 at an annual rate of interest of 2%.
