= 1910 in Afghanistan =

- Decades: 1890s; 1900s; 1910s; 1920s; 1930s
- See also: Other events of 1910; List of years in Afghanistan

The following lists events that happened during 1910 in Afghanistan.

== Incumbents ==
- Monarch – Habibullah Khan

== Summer 1910 ==
A joint British and Afghan commission appointed to settle tribal disputes arising out of raids and counter-raids on each side of the British-Afghan border commences its work, starting from the Kurram Valley. Its labours are brought to a satisfactory conclusion before the close of the year. The agreement reached provides that outlaws from either side shall be removed to a distance of not less than fifty miles from the border, and orders to give effect to this within British territory are at once issued.
