= 1924 in Afghanistan =

- Decades: 1900s; 1910s; 1920s; 1930s; 1940s
- See also: Other events of 1924; List of years in Afghanistan

The following lists events that happened during 1924 in Afghanistan.

== Incumbents ==
- Monarch – Amanullah Khan

== January 1924 ==
After long delay, the Afghan government at length took energetic measures to arrest the lawless gangs which, after committing several murders of British officials and their wives across the border, had found refuge on Afghan territory. The so-called "Kohat gang" was captured on January 13 and brought to Kabul, and of the "Landi-Kotal" murderers one was killed a few days afterwards and the other wounded, but not captured. The prisoners were subsequently deported to Turkestan. At the same time the Afghan government desisted from employing Wazir tribesmen from British territory in its army, thus showing a less unfriendly spirit to Britain than had characterized it for some time previously.

== End of April 1924 ==
The amir had to, as in the previous year, meet a serious rebellion, the Khost rebellion, due to discontent with the reforms which he was seeking to introduce. The centre of the revolt was the Khost district, and the chief tribe engaged was the Mangals. The rebels threatened Matun, and a considerable force was sent by the amir to relieve it. A sharp engagement took place near the city in May, with indecisive result. The revolt gained strength, and in July the rebels proclaimed Abd-al Karim as amir, professing to be a grandson of amir Shir Ali. The Indian government, however, claimed he was the illegitimate Indian-born son of amir Yakub Khan, who disowned him as a disgrace to the Afghan community.

In August, the amir purchased two aeroplanes from the British for use against the rebels, and his consort stimulated the enthusiasm of his soldiers by distributing large rewards to all who served under his flag. Nevertheless, the struggle with the rebels, who had been joined by other tribes, continued for some time. In October the rebels began to show signs of demoralization; a severe defeat was inflicted on them at Logar, and by November the insurrection in the Khost had generally subsided. The government, however, still maintained a strong force in the Khost.

Earlier in the year Russian envoys at Kabul sought to excite anti-British feeling, and in particular to accuse Britain of fomenting the rebellion. In spite of this, relations between Afghanistan and Britain improved considerably.

== Births ==
- March 10 – Ludwig W. Adamec, Afghan-born Austrian historian (died 2019)
