= 1956 in Afghanistan =

- Decades: 1930s; 1940s; 1950s; 1960s; 1970s
- See also: Other events of 1956; List of years in Afghanistan

The following lists events that happened during 1956 in Afghanistan.

== Incumbents ==
- Monarch – Mohammed Zahir Shah
- Prime Minister – Mohammed Daoud Khan

== Events ==
- January 27 – King Zahir approves the new cabinet still headed by Mohammad Daud Khan, a king's cousin, who also holds the portfolio of defense; Naim Khan, another king's cousin, continues as Foreign Minister and Second Deputy Premier; Ali Mohammad Khan becomes First Deputy Premier. Daud has thus finally succeeded in ousting from the government the supporters of Gen. Mohammad Arif, Minister of Defense, who was dismissed and put under arrest at the beginning of December 1955. At the same time more than 70 other persons, both army officers and civilians, were also arrested.
- January 28, 1956 – A joint Soviet-Afghan statement says that the U.S.S.R. will ensure delivery of "equipment and materials" on account of the $100,000,000 credit granted in December 1955, and will also grant "other services connected with technical assistance in building certain installations" in many branches of Afghan economy. According to Pakistani sources, $40,000,000 of the Soviet credits is earmarked for arms from the U.S.S.R. and Czechoslovakia and $60,000,000 for building airports and roads.
- March 21–22 – On his way to India, Anastas Mikoyan stays in Kabul.
- July 1956 – The Swedish citizen Gunnel Gummeson and her American boyfriend Peter Winant disappear in Afghanistan on their way home from India.
- July 1956 – Adnan Menderes, the Turkish prime minister, pays a visit to Afghanistan.
- August 1956 – Maj. Gen. Iskander Mirza, the president of Pakistan, stays four days in the Afghan capital. It is believed that both Menderes and Mirza discussed at Kabul the possibility of Afghanistan's joining the Baghdad Pact, the problems of the Pathan or Pakhtu tribesmen, and their aspiration for a "Pakhtunistan" state.
- November 1956 – Mohammad Daud, the Afghan prime minister, visits Karachi, Pakistan. No mention is made thereafter in Afghan official statements of the "Pakhtunistan" question, that is, Afghan plans to create a separate state for Pakhtu-speaking peoples in Pakistan.
