= 1897 in Afghanistan =

- Decades: 1870s; 1880s; 1890s; 1900s; 1910s
- See also: Other events of 1897; List of years in Afghanistan

The following lists events that happened during 1897 in Afghanistan.

The amir's realm is quiet during the year. Suspicions that Abdur Rahman Khan is acting unfaithfully towards the British are dispelled by his loyal attitude in refusing to aid the rebel tribesmen engaged in the frontier war, or even to sympathize with them. Across the Indian border the First Mohmand Campaign in the North-West Frontier Province starts in August 1897.

== Incumbents ==
- Monarch – Abdur Rahman Khan

== Events ==
=== January 1897 ===
The Kamdesh Kafirs are being rapidly disarmed. The headmen of the villages in the Bashgal Valley send a deputation to the sipah salar (commander-in-chief) requesting him to keep back the force that is to be sent to collect arms in every village, promising themselves to collect the knives, guns, and other weapons, and to hand them over to the Afghans.

=== May 1897 ===
The amir withdraws the officials and irregular soldiers who occupied for a year the Mittai Valley in contravention of the Durand Line Agreement.

=== September 6 and 7, 1897 ===
Nearly 150 shops in the Kabul city bazaar are destroyed by fire, and several lives are lost.

== See also ==
- History of Afghanistan
