= 1898 in Afghanistan =

- Decades: 1870s; 1880s; 1890s; 1900s; 1910s
- See also: Other events of 1898; List of years in Afghanistan

The following lists events that happened during 1898 in Afghanistan.

The state of Afghanistan is peaceful and quiet throughout the year, with few exceptions. The amir suffers much inconvenience and loss through the frontier disturbances, and to steer a middle course between the fanatical forces about him and his foreign obligations is difficult. He is accused of harbouring Afridi refugees, but since they are fugitive Muslims, the amir by his religion is bound not to repel them when seeking refuge without prearrangement. The amir is not implicated in supplying arms and ammunition to the tribesmen. Across the Indian border, the First Mohmand Campaign in the North-West Frontier Province finishes in January 1898.

== Incumbents ==
- Monarch – Abdur Rahman Khan

== Events ==
=== April 1898 ===
The amir appoints Mir Atta Khan of Herat to succeed the late Sipah Salar Gholam Haidar Khan Orakzai.

=== May 1898 ===
It is announced that the Afridis are again sending jirgas to interview Abdor Rahman at Kabul. These deputations, which are composed of Zakka khels, are turned back by the governor of Jalalabad, no doubt by orders from the amir. Sir James Westland, when speaking at Simla in June, warmly eulogizes the conduct of the amir, and says that the tribesmen should now see that although the Indian government made an agreement with the amir, that agreement was not intended to interfere in any way with their independence.

=== December 1898 ===
A message from the amir is received by the Indian government in which he says, speaking of the raid by Waziris into Afghan territory, that he expects the British will check such raids, just as the Indian government expects the Afghan officials to prevent attacks similar to that made in August on a party of coolies in the Tochi Valley.

== See also ==
- History of Afghanistan
