= 1958 in Afghanistan =

- Decades: 1930s; 1940s; 1950s; 1960s; 1970s
- See also: Other events of 1958; List of years in Afghanistan

The following lists events that happened during 1958 in Afghanistan.

The five-year development plan, begun in 1957, is being revised on the basis of experience gained. The total expenditure envisaged amounts to 5,708,600,000 Afghanis at an average yearly rate of 1,141,700,000 Afghanis. This means a rate of investment equal to 8% of the national income. Three-fourths of the total development plan is to be financed from national sources, and the remainder from foreign assistance. The total foreign exchange requirement is estimated at $196,000,000. According to the U.S. International Cooperation Administration, Afghanistan received from the United States $18,300,000 of economic aid in 1955–56 and $14,400,000 in 1956–57. The amount for 1957–58 is estimated at $5,800,000.

== Incumbents ==
- Monarch – Mohammed Zahir Shah
- Prime Minister – Mohammed Daoud Khan

== February 1, 1958 ==
King Mohammad Zahir Shah pays an official visit to Pakistan. He also visits India in February. In his speech at the banquet given by Pres. Rajendra Prasad, the king speaks of the "traditionally neutral policy" of his country and of the "lasting friendship" between India and Afghanistan.

== May 30, 1958 ==
In Kabul, the representatives of Pakistan and Afghanistan sign an agreement guaranteeing reciprocal transit rights across each other's territory.

== June 24, 1958 ==
The Afghan prime minister arrives in Washington, where he addresses both the U.S. House of Representatives and the Senate.

== August 1958 ==
In August 1958, Pashtun intellectuals held a congress in Kabul, with the goal of standardizing the Pashto alphabet. During the congress, a number of standardizations were proposed in the use of the modern Pashto alphabet.

== September 2, 1958 ==
Viliám Siroký, the prime minister of Czechoslovakia, arrives in Kabul.

== September 12–20, 1958 ==
Celal Bayar, president of Turkey, is the guest of King Mohammad Zahir.

== October 1, 1958 ==
Kliment Voroshilov, chairman of the presidium of the Supreme Soviet of the U.S.S.R., makes a return visit of friendship to Afghanistan.
