= 1957 in Afghanistan =

- Decades: 1930s; 1940s; 1950s; 1960s; 1970s
- See also: Other events of 1957; List of years in Afghanistan

The following lists events that happened during 1957 in Afghanistan.

== Incumbents ==
- Monarch – Mohammed Zahir Shah
- Prime Minister – Mohammed Daoud Khan

== April and May 1957 ==
Mohammad Daud visits Austria, Czechoslovakia, Poland, Turkey, and Egypt.

== January 19–23, 1957 ==
Premier of the People's Republic of China Zhou Enlai visits Afghanistan.

== June 8–11, 1957 ==
H.S. Suhrawardi, the Prime Minister of Pakistan, visits Kabul and, as a result of his conversation with Mohammad Daud, the two governments agree to restore full diplomatic relations between the two countries.

== July 17–31, 1957 ==
King Mohammad Zahir Shah, accompanied by Mohammad Naim, Deputy Premier and Minister of Foreign Affairs (he is also a cousin of the king and his brother-in-law), pays a state visit to the U.S.S.R. After a few days in Moscow, the king tours the Soviet Union. On his return to Moscow he and Kliment Voroshilov, chairman of the Presidium of the Supreme Soviet, sign on July 30 a joint communiqué emphasizing the desire of their governments "to develop and promote the welfare of their countries"; the king explains to the Soviet statesmen "the neutral policy of Afghanistan" and the two parties affirm that "the principle of peaceful coexistence between all the nations" is in tune with the principles of the UN Charter. A statement is issued on July 31 that Soviet technicians will assist Afghanistan in prospecting for oil in the Maiman and Mazar-i-Sharif areas, near the Soviet frontier. On August 31 Mohammad Naim announces at Kabul that Afghanistan will receive about $25,000,000 worth of Soviet military material.

== August 26, 1957 ==
King Mohammad Zahir arrives in Turkey for a 15-day official visit.

== Autumn 1957 ==
Mohammad Daud Khan, the prime minister, pays a visit to Burma and to the People's Republic of China where, on October 25, Mao Zedong gives a banquet to honour the representative of a nation "that valiantly resisted colonialism."
