= 1965 in Afghanistan =

- Decades: 1940s; 1950s; 1960s; 1970s; 1980s
- See also: Other events of 1965; List of years in Afghanistan

The following lists events that happened during 1965 in Afghanistan.

In foreign affairs Afghanistan maintains its position of nonalignment, receiving aid from, and cultivating friendly relations with, Communist as well as non-Communist countries. Along with Pakistan, Afghanistan adjusts its boundary with Communist China. The improvement of relations with Pakistan continues, and although toward the end of 1964 the loya jirga (the traditional Grand Council of the nation, superseded under the new constitution) passed a formal resolution in favour of the creation of Pakhtunistan, the violent propaganda that had offended Pakistan so seriously died down. Trade between the two countries greatly increases, as does the flow of visitors and tourists. When war between India and Pakistan breaks out in the autumn, Afghanistan maintains a friendly neutrality and does not add to Pakistan's difficulties.

== Incumbents ==
- Monarch – Mohammed Zahir Shah
- Prime Minister – Mohammad Yusuf (until 2 November), Mohammad Hashim Maiwandwal (starting 2 November)

== September 1965 ==
Elections are completed, with women voting for the first time. Several unofficial parties run candidates with beliefs ranging from fundamentalist Islam to the extreme left. Turnout is very low, leading to the vocal predominance of Kabuli radicals. This first elected assembly meets on October 14; eleven days later dissident leftist students, dissatisfied with the newly appointed cabinet, disrupt the meetings and rioting ensues. Prime Minister Mohammad Yusuf resigns on October 29, and the king appoints Mohammad Hashim Maiwandwal to form a cabinet, which is confirmed on November 2.
