= 1920 in Afghanistan =

- Decades: 1900s; 1910s; 1920s; 1930s; 1940s
- See also: Other events of 1920; List of years in Afghanistan

The following lists events that happened during 1920 in Afghanistan.

== Incumbents ==
- Monarch – Amanullah Khan

== Spring 1920 ==
As relations with Britain remained strained, a conference between British and Afghan representatives takes place at Mussoorie, which results in steps being taken to reestablish more normal relations and to settle outstanding questions. No further hostilities occur, though there is some fear on the British side that Russian influence is penetrating the country to some extent.
