= 1960 in Afghanistan =

- Decades: 1940s; 1950s; 1960s; 1970s; 1980s
- See also: Other events of 1960; List of years in Afghanistan

The following lists events that happened during 1960 in the Kingdom of Afghanistan.

The U.S.S.R. has by this year spent or committed about $300,000,000 in economic aid to Afghanistan. The latest Soviet enterprise is the building of the Salang highway across the Hindu Kush range to shorten the route between Kabul and the northern provinces by 190 km. The Soviet government promises $22,400,000 in aid to construct the Jalalabad dam on the Kabul river to provide electricity to the capital. Soviet technicians find petroleum in the area of Mazar-i-Sharif, on the Afghan side of the Amu Darya (Oxus) river. United States economic aid to Afghanistan totals by 1960 about $165,000,000, including a loan of $50,000,000. The National Assembly approved the budget estimate for the year 1960–61, balanced at 4,500,000,000 Afghanis. Abdullah Malikyar, minister of finance, declares that a total of 2,540,000,000 Afghanis of the budget expenditure will be used to implement the last year of the 1957–61 development plan.

== Incumbents ==
- Monarch – Mohammed Zahir Shah
- Prime Minister – Mohammed Daoud Khan

== January 1960 ==
Mohammad Naim visits Karachi, Pakistan. In late February he held a press conference at Kabul, in which he complained of the "completely negative attitude" of Pakistan toward the Afghan claim to Pashtunistan (the former North-West Frontier Province in which, according to Kabul, 7,000,000 Pathan tribesmen are anxious to join Afghanistan).

== March 2–5, 1960 ==
Nikita Khrushchev, the Prime Minister of the U.S.S.R., visits Kabul. In a joint statement Khrushchev and Mohammad Daud, the Afghan Prime Minister, declare that in order to establish peace in the Middle East "the application of the principle of self-determination" is the reasonable way to solve the problems of Pashtunistan.

== August 1960 ==
At Kabul, a ten-year Sino-Afghan treaty of friendship is signed by Mohammad Daud and Chen Yi, the deputy premier and foreign minister of Communist China.

== September 1960 ==
Speaking at the UN General Assembly Mohammad Naim, the Deputy Prime Minister and Foreign Minister, describes his country's position as "most impartial and independent in international affairs," its only alliance being its membership in the United Nations.
