= 1961 in Afghanistan =

- Decades: 1940s; 1950s; 1960s; 1970s; 1980s
- See also: Other events of 1961; List of years in Afghanistan

The following lists events that happened during 1961 in Afghanistan.

== Incumbents ==
- Monarch – Mohammed Zahir Shah
- Prime Minister – Mohammed Daoud Khan

== April 1961 ==
Prime Minister Sardar Mohammad Daud Khan visits the Soviet Union at the personal invitation of Nikita Khrushchev. They issue a statement of full mutual understanding and identity of long-range views.

== June 1961 ==
Mohammad Daud announces that his government seeks $700 million in aid from the United States and the U.S.S.R. to implement the second five-year plan, which aims at an increase of 8% to 10% annually in the national income over the plan period. Industrial production is to rise 375% and investment 500%.

== Late August 1961 ==
Due to the controversy over Pakhtunistan (or Pathanistan; the Afghan demand for self-determination for about 7,000,000 members of border tribes), the Pakistan government closes Afghan consulates and trade missions in its territory. Afghanistan thereupon sets September 6, 1961, as a deadline for Pakistan to rescind the order. Pakistan does not.

== September 1961 ==
On September 3, 1961, Afghanistan seals its side of the border and on September 6, 1961, breaks relations. The consequences are far-reaching, as Afghanistan then demands that all trade, including U.S. economic aid, be channeled through Soviet access routes. Sixty percent of the Afghan population is Pakhtun (Pathan) and Afghanistan has steadfastly refused to accept the old Afghan-British Durand line of 1893 as a suitable permanent boundary between the Pathans of Afghanistan and of Pakistan, while Pakistan refused to draw a new frontier. Throughout 1961 the two nations exchanged charges, Afghanistan saying that Pakistan brutally suppressed tribal leaders and bombed them with U.S.-made aircraft, while Pakistan alleged that Afghan armed forces, using Soviet equipment, constantly violated the border. The Afghan representative to the United Nations, A.R. Pazhwak, strongly defended the concept of Pathan self-determination.

Afghanistan completes its first five-year plan, with some sectors described as over-fulfilled. Daud attends the Belgrade conference of non-aligned nations, visiting Britain and West Germany first.
