= 1916 in Afghanistan =

- Decades: 1890s; 1900s; 1910s; 1920s; 1930s
- See also: Other events of 1916; List of years in Afghanistan

The following lists events that happened during 1916 in Afghanistan.

== Incumbents ==
- Monarch – Habibullah Khan

== Events ==
The amir maintained his neutrality in World War I, and the state did not become involved in the troubles of Persia. At the end of the year information was published concerning a German mission sent to Afghanistan in the previous year. It appeared that Kaiser Wilhelm had sent a German officer, Lieut. Werner Otto von Hentig, accompanied by certain Indian revolutionaries who lived in Berlin, on a mission to the amir, with the object of inducing him to attack India. The members of the mission succeeded in making their way through Persia, by breaking up into small parties, and they remained in Afghanistan nearly a year. Nevertheless, the amir refused the Turco-German proposals, and after the mission left Afghanistan in May 1916, some of the members were captured by the Russians and British as they were trying to get back to Turkey.
