= 1899 in Afghanistan =

- Decades: 1870s; 1880s; 1890s; 1900s; 1910s
- See also: Other events of 1899; List of years in Afghanistan

The following lists events that happened during 1899 in Afghanistan.

Not for many years has Afghanistan been less disturbed than this year. Few tribal risings occur and the amir Abdor Rahman continues to express friendly relations with Britain. Yet there is a disquieting rumour that Russia is preparing to advance on Herat in certain eventualities, and that an experimental mobilization of Russian troops from Tiflis to Kushk (some sixty miles from Herat) was made at the close of the year. The amir keeps up a friendly correspondence with the viceroy, Lord Curzon, during the year, and the relations between Afghanistan and the Indian government were never more cordial.

== Incumbents ==
- Monarch – Abdur Rahman Khan

== Events ==
=== February 1899 ===
Several small disturbances are created along the frontier by marauding bands of Waziris and Mahsuds, which are easily suppressed by the local militia without aid from regular troops.

=== March 1, 1899 ===
Capt. George Roos-Keppel makes a sudden attack on a predatory band of Chamkannis that have been raiding in the Kurram Valley and captures 100 prisoners with 3,000 head of cattle. These raids, though tiresome, are, however, of no political importance.

=== May 1899 ===
In consequence of repeated outrages committed by the Waziris, and especially because of the murder of Col. E.H. le Marchant of the Hampshire Regiment, the Indian government orders the partial disarmament of the Peshawar division, and of all trans-border Pashtuns at the frontier, and the disarmament of all persons without licenses in all municipalities and cantonments within the division.

=== July 1899 ===
In spite of punitive measures, the Waziri robbers continue their lawless attacks, chiefly with a view to cattle raiding.

=== December 1899 ===
In accordance with the frontier policy of the viceroy, all regular troops are withdrawn from the Khyber Pass to Peshawar, leaving the forts and posts in the pass to be guarded by the Khyber Rifles. Complete tranquillity prevails in consequence, and the Afridis and other local tribes are thereby convinced that the government has no idea of annexing their territory or of placing British garrisons over the border.

== See also ==
- History of Afghanistan
