= 1900 in Afghanistan =

- Decades: 1880s; 1890s; 1900s; 1910s; 1920s
- See also: Other events of 1900; List of years in Afghanistan

The following lists events that happened during 1900 in Afghanistan.

Rumours of contemplated aggression by Russia continue throughout the year, and are the source of much annoyance to the amir Abdur Rahman. He complains that the British government takes no interest in his distresses, and that whenever he has proposed some check upon Russian aggressions the government of India has made no response except the suggestion that Afghanistan might consent to the construction of railways and telegraphs within her territories. From the Afghan point of view he declares that such concession will be impossible and only a step to ruin. For several years the amir has given much attention to increasing the efficiency of his army, and his regulars, backed by the tribes on the frontier, would be formidable against any invader of his territory. The amir has never departed from a purely defensive attitude, and under his treaty with England if an unprovoked attack was made upon him he could claim British help.

Trade with India is injured by the fiscal policy of the amir. Besides creating state monopolies with regard to several articles, he forbids the export of horses to India and the import of salt therefrom. Only sixty-two camel loads leave Peshawar in the year compared with 2,285 during the previous year.

== Incumbents ==
- Monarch – Abdur Rahman Khan

== Events ==
=== June 1900 ===
A cholera epidemic breaks out at Jalalabad and at Kabul and continues to the beginning of August, causing in Kabul the death of nearly 5,000 people. After the departure of Sir Thomas Salter Pyne the government workshops go on with their regular work under Afghan management.

=== September 1900 ===
The Mahsud Waziris resume their petty raids on the frontier. On the night of October 23 a band of them attacks the military post of Nasran, killing two men and robbing the magazine. Lieutenant Hennessey starts in pursuit, but his force is not sufficient to capture them and they escape to the ravines. A wounded Mahsud lying prone fires at Lieutenant Hennessey at a distance of five yards with fatal effect. The raiders lose one killed and five wounded.

=== October 1900 ===
A successful operation is carried out against the Madda Khels in the Tochi Pass by a small column. Four Pathan towers are blown up by the troops, who meet with no opposition. This action was due to the refusal of the Khels to surrender certain ringleaders implicated in the Maizar outrage of 1897.

=== November 1900 ===
The amir Abdor Rahman publishes his autobiography, in which he complains that English policy in Afghan affairs has been inconstant and vacillating, and he urges the importance of direct diplomatic relations with Britain. He considers that England ought to give Afghanistan more of her confidence and more of her moral and material support, allowing him to annex all the territory of the independent Pathan tribes and to form a triple alliance with the neighbouring Muslim states, Persia and Turkey. Also that Afghanistan ought to secure an outlet to the ocean and have a port for her own steamers at which to load and unload. He thinks that the policy of Afghanistan towards her two strong neighbours - England and Russia - should be friendly towards the one least aggressive, and hostile to the power wishing to pass through her country or interfere with her independence.

=== November 8, 1900 ===
The commissioner of Derajat, W.R.H. Merk, meets some 500 Mahsud Waziris and announces to them the terms of the government. Payment of a fine of one 0.1 million is demanded, one half to be paid by November 25, otherwise the whole tribe would be blockaded from December 1. Dreading a blockade much more than a punitive expedition the Mahsuds agree to pay the fine and promise not to raid. The Mullah Powindah, their fanatical leader, is personally assisting in the collection of the fine in December.

== See also ==
- History of Afghanistan
