= 1908 in Afghanistan =

- Decades: 1880s; 1890s; 1900s; 1910s; 1920s
- See also: Other events of 1908; List of years in Afghanistan

The following lists events that happened during 1908 in Afghanistan.

The amir's reply to the communication informing him of the convention between England and Russia so far as it relates to Afghanistan is not made known. His attitude during the Zakka Khel and Mohmand expeditions in India is much criticized by the British, and he is blamed for not taking more effectual measures to restrain his subjects from assisting the enemy. Others, however, consider that in such matters even an amir's power is limited, and there is no reason to doubt that he has been friendly to Britain throughout and has done all that he could.

== Incumbents ==
- Monarch – Habibullah Khan
