= 1927 in Afghanistan =

- Decades: 1900s; 1910s; 1920s; 1930s; 1940s
- See also: Other events of 1927; List of years in Afghanistan

The following lists events that happened during 1927 in Afghanistan.

== Incumbents ==
- Monarch – Amanullah Khan
- Prime Minister – Shir Ahmad (starting 25 October)

== Events ==
- The year is free from internal disturbances. During a tour in the southern provinces, King Amanullah is loyally received by the same Mangals who were in revolt against him a couple of years previously. Some restiveness shown by the Uzbeks of Afghan Turkestan is also calmed by a personal visit from the king in May.
- May - In pursuance of his settled policy of modernizing Afghan institutions, the king reorganizes the arrangements for the budget after a conference with his ministers at Jalalabad. The revenue estimates are satisfactory, and not only are liberal allocations granted to various departments, but provision is made for opening twenty-seven new primary boys' schools and three girls' schools, also schools of agriculture and telegraphy. In order to gain new ideas for the improvement of his country, the king further plans an extended tour in foreign, especially European, countries.
- December - The preparations for his tour having been completed, King Amanullah makes a farewell speech to his officials at Kabul, in which he states that Afghanistan, in the shadow of freedom, has said good-bye forever to her stationary position, and has joined the "social and living nations of the age." The farewell durbar is held at Kandahar - a place with which the king has close family connections - and from there the king travels via Quetta and Karachi to Bombay. He is accompanied by his queen and by his minister for foreign affairs, and other high officials. The minister of war, Sardar Mohammad Wali Khan, is left as regent in his absence. The royal party reaches Bombay on December 14. They are received by the governor - the viceroy being confined to bed with malaria - and are given an enthusiastic popular welcome. Amanullah during his stay visits the principal mosque, and delivers a sermon, in which he recommends to his Muslim hearers tolerance of other faiths. Leaving Bombay on December 18, the party sails to Egypt, stopping on the way at Aden, where the king and queen land for a few hours and visit the residency. Port Said is reached on December 26, and from there the party proceeds to Cairo, where they are entertained by King Fuad.
- The Swedish citizen Aurora Nilsson obtain a unique divorce from her Afghan spouse Asim Khan, possibly the first time in Afghanistan a woman could divorce a man on equal terms.

== Births ==
=== Full Date Unknown ===
- Fazal Hadi Shinwari, cleric (d. 2011)
