= 1923 in Afghanistan =

- Decades: 1900s; 1910s; 1920s; 1930s; 1940s
- See also: Other events of 1923; List of years in Afghanistan

The following lists events that happened during 1923 in Afghanistan.

Friction between the amir Amanullah and a large part of his subjects is one of the outstanding features of the year, and the other is the straining of Afghan-British relations which takes place towards its close. The chief causes of disaffection against the amir have been his attempts to purify the administration and to impose conscription on the people. The levying of taxes has also, as was to be expected, proved a most difficult matter, and want of money has not allowed the amir to proceed very far on his path of reform. Nevertheless, in some lines substantial progress has been made. Most notable is the spread of education among the people. There are now thousands of Afghan boys receiving schooling, and 200 are being educated abroad; and these are expected in course of time to provide an efficient civil service and judiciary.

== Incumbents ==
- Monarch – Amanullah Khan

== First half of 1923 ==
In interfering with the local hakims, who though notoriously corrupt have maintained some semblance of law and order in their respective districts, the amir tries to introduce more civilized methods for which the population is not yet ripe, and consequently lawlessness and unrest increase considerably, culminating in the revolt of the formidable Alizai tribe.

== January 1923 ==
The amir sends a message to King George V on the Lausanne conference, and the king's reply, expressing his earnest desire for an equitable solution of the Turkish problem, creates a favourable impression in Afghanistan.

== March 1923 ==
Telegraphic communication between Afghanistan and Britain started. An exchange of messages still more friendly than in January takes place on the occasion. The amir thanks the king for the services rendered by British officials in the progress of the work, and expresses a hope for the continuance of good relations between the two nations, at the same time appealing to Britain for fair dealing with the Muslim world. The king reciprocates the amir's good wishes, and emphasizes the desire of Britain to live in peaceful and neighbourly cooperation with the Muslim world. Despite this great step forward towards removing the isolation of Afghanistan, in the all-important matter of internal communications little advance is made during the year. No railways are commenced, and small progress is made with the new roads planned for motor traffic, while the existing roads from Kabul to Peshawar and Kandahar have if anything deteriorated. In the absence of good communications there can be little chance of developing the natural resources of the country.

== April 1923 ==
The amir's passion for justice is shown by his passing a sentence of imprisonment on the stepfather of his own mother, Shah Ghazi Mohammad Sarwar Khan, for misappropriation of public funds.

Two murders of British subjects are perpetrated by tribesmen on the North-West Indian frontier at Kohat and Landi Kotal, and the murderers flee to Afghanistan. On June 4 the Afghan government informs the British minister at Kabul that orders have been issued for their immediate arrest, but several weeks pass before the arrest is effected. The British suspect that the amir is acting under Bolshevik influence and purposely flouting England. When the murderers actually are arrested, they manage to escape from prison before trial, and though there is no proof of connivance on the part of the authorities, the incident makes a bad impression. In order to remove this the Afghan government for a time adopts more energetic measures against the outlaws on the border, and in October a joint Afghan and British commission meets at Karachi on the frontier to investigate a number of incidents that have occurred. From this point, however, matters instead of improving seem to grow rapidly worse. The Afghans become suspicious that England is once more harbouring imperialistic designs and seeking to regain her exclusive domination over their country. These feelings are strongly expressed by the Afghan minister in Paris, Sardar Tarzi Khan, in an interview which he gives to the Nation on December 16. He charges the British in particular with having three months earlier held up at Bombay a quantity of arms for the Afghan police, in breach of the treaty between Afghanistan and Britain made in 1921, and of the trade convention of June 5 of the current year which among other things confirmed the obligation then accepted by the British government to allow the transit of arms to Afghanistan through India. The British defense is that according to the treaty the importation is to be permitted only so long as the intentions of the Afghan government are friendly, and no immediate danger to India is involved. By the end of the year the situation as between the two countries is generally regarded as serious. The Afghan suspicions of Britain's intentions are believed to be fostered by other countries, notably Russia and France, as shown by a striking article in L'Ere Nouvelle of December 26, which suggests that it is the independent policy of Afghanistan rather than the activity of brigands which disquiets Britain. Britain's last act during the year is to demand the removal of the Bolshevik representative from Kabul, a step which is characterized in Russian quarters as an "ultimatum."

== May 1923 ==
The amir having given to France exclusive rights of archaeological research in Afghanistan, excavations near Kabul are commenced by Alfred Foucher, a professor at the Sorbonne, and a leading authority on Buddhism. On representations being made by the British government Foucher declares his intention of inviting the distinguished British authority Sir Aurel Stein to take a share in the investigations in Afghanistan. For one reason or other, however, the invitation is not extended, and in December Foucher, instead of commencing excavations near Jalalabad, as was his original intention, leaves, under instructions from Paris, for Balkh, 350 miles north of Kabul in the neighbourhood of the Hindu Kush, which has been regarded as the special archaeological province of Sir Aurel Stein.
