= 1901 in Afghanistan =

- Decades: 1880s; 1890s; 1900s; 1910s; 1920s
- See also: Other events of 1901; List of years in Afghanistan

The following lists events that happened during 1901 in Afghanistan.

== Incumbents ==
- Monarch – Abdur Rahman Khan (until October 1), Habibullah Khan (starting October 1)

== Events ==
- October 3 – The amir Abdor Rahman Khan dies at Kabul. His eldest son, Habibullah Khan, succeeds to the throne.

== See also ==
- History of Afghanistan
