= 1917 in Afghanistan =

- Decades: 1890s; 1900s; 1910s; 1920s; 1930s
- See also: Other events of 1917; List of years in Afghanistan

The following lists events that happened during 1917 in Afghanistan.

== Incumbents ==
- Monarch – Habibullah Khan

== May 1917 ==
It is reported that Turco-German agents are fomenting unrest in Afghanistan and are instigating the chiefs to make incursions into Russian Turkestan. These intrigues appear to have no success, however, and there are no indications that the loyalty of the emir to the Indian government has been in the least shaken.
