= Habibullah Khan (Kabul) =

Habibullah Khan I حبيب الله خان اول
- Sardar (Note: Persian: سردار, romanized: Sardār [säɾ.d̪ɑ́ːɾ])
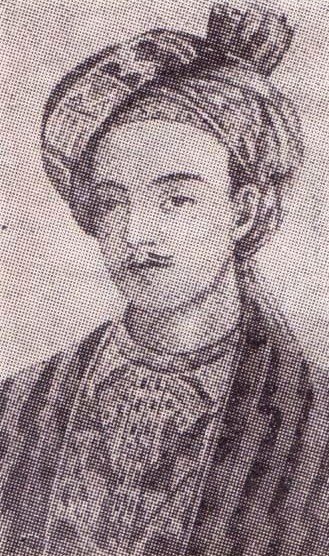
- Miniature portrait of Habibullah Khan c. 1823

Sardar of Kabul
- Reign: 1823 – August 1824
- Predecessor: Office established (Ayub Shah Durrani as King of the Durrani Empire)
- Successor: Yar Mohammad Khan
- Born: c. 1799; Kandahar, Durrani Empire
- Died: Kabul, Principality of Kabul
- Dynasty: Barakzai
- Father: Mohammad Azim Khan
- Mother: a Popalzai lady
- Religion: Sunni Islam

Habibullah Khan Barakzai (Note: Pashto: حبيب الله خان بارکزی, romanized: Habib Allāh Xān Bārakzai [(h)a.bi.bu(l).lɑ(h) xɑn bɑ.ɾak.zaɪ]; Persian: حبیب الله خان بارکزی, romanized: Habīb Allāh Khān Bārakzay [(h)ä.bíːb‿ʊl.lɑ́ː(ʱ) xɑːn bɑː.ɾäk.záj]) (born 1799) was the founder and the first Sardar of the Principality of Kabul who ruled from 1823 until his deposition in 1824.

== Early life ==
Habibullah Khan was born in Kandahar in 1799 (Note: states that Habibullah Khan was 25 years of age in 1823.) into the Mohammadzai branch of the Barakzai Pashtuns to his father Mohammad Azim Khan and to a Popalzai mother.

== Rise to power ==
Habibullah Khan's father Mohammad Azim Khan was the de facto head of state of Afghanistan from 1818 to 1823, while Ayub Shah Durrani ruled by name. With the Barakzais having power over the Afghan army, treasury and administration, their Durrani puppets would remain heads of state to represent the old Durrani legitimacy of Ahmad Shah Durrani's lineage.

Following his father's succumb to cholera, Habibullah Khan succeeded his position. Ayub Shah lost popularity among the Barakzais and was in a helpless position, which allowed Habibullah to plot against the de jure ruling Durranis, and called the Kandahar Sardars for assistance.

Pur Dil Khan seized the Bala Hissar while the Barakzais led by him looted the palace, leaving Ayub Shah's son Ismail Mirza Durrani killed in the process. Ayub Shah was publicly humiliated by being paraded on a donkey, ransomed, and exiled to India. The Durranis were left helpless for they had no army, nor did they have coherent tribal support nor any ability to enforce authority. Habibullah Khan then founded the Principality of Kabul and assumed the title of Sardar, without any Durrani head of state.

Wanting to curb Dost Mohammad Khan's growing influence, Habibullah Khan sought assistance from the Kandahar Sardars again, but this resulted in another interregnum, and led to him being deposed and imprisoned by Sher Dil Khan.
