= Abd al-Zahir =

ʻAbd al-Ẓāhir (ALA-LC romanization of Arabic: عبد الظاهر) literally, "servant (or slave) of the Evident (Outer)," "evident" or "outer" being a reference to Allah, is the name of:

- Abdul Zahir (politician) (1910–1983), Prime Minister of Afghanistan 1971–1972
- Abdul Zahir (Guantanamo detainee 753) (born 1972), Afghan, tenth Guantanamo captive to face charges
- Abdel-Zaher El-Saqua (born 1974), Egyptian footballer
