= Louis Dane =

British administrator in the British Raj

Sir Louis Dane GCIE CSI
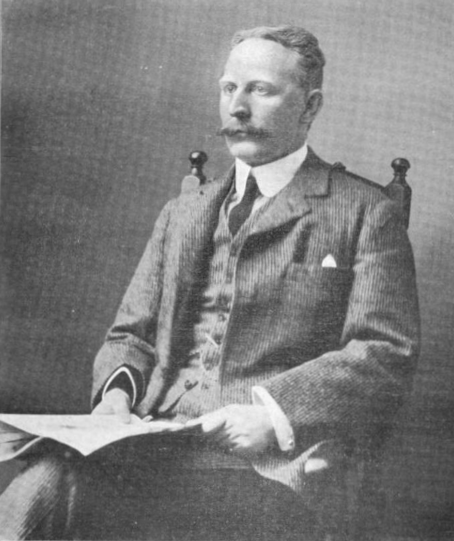
- Born: Louis William Dane; 21 March 1856; Chichester, England
- Died: 22 February 1946 (aged 89); South Kensington, England
- Resting place: Southampton Old Cemetery
- Occupation: Colonial administrator

Sir Louis William Dane GCIE CSI (21 March 1856 – 22 February 1946) was an Anglo-Irish administrator during the time of the British Raj.

== Early life ==
He was born on 21 March 1856 at Chichester, Sussex, the fifth son of Richard Martin Dane, an army staff surgeon, and Sophia Eliza, the daughter of Colonel Charles Griffiths who had served in the First Anglo-Afghan War. Richard Morris Dane, was his brother. He was educated at Dr Stackpole's school in Kingstown, Dublin and passed his examinations for the Indian Civil Service in 1874. He married Edith Norman on 3 March 1882.

== Civil service ==
In 1876, he was posted to the Punjab as assistant commissioner in Dera Ghazi Khan. In 1879, he became private secretary to Sir Robert Egerton, Lieutenant-Governor of the Punjab. He became Foreign Secretary to the Government of India in 1903.

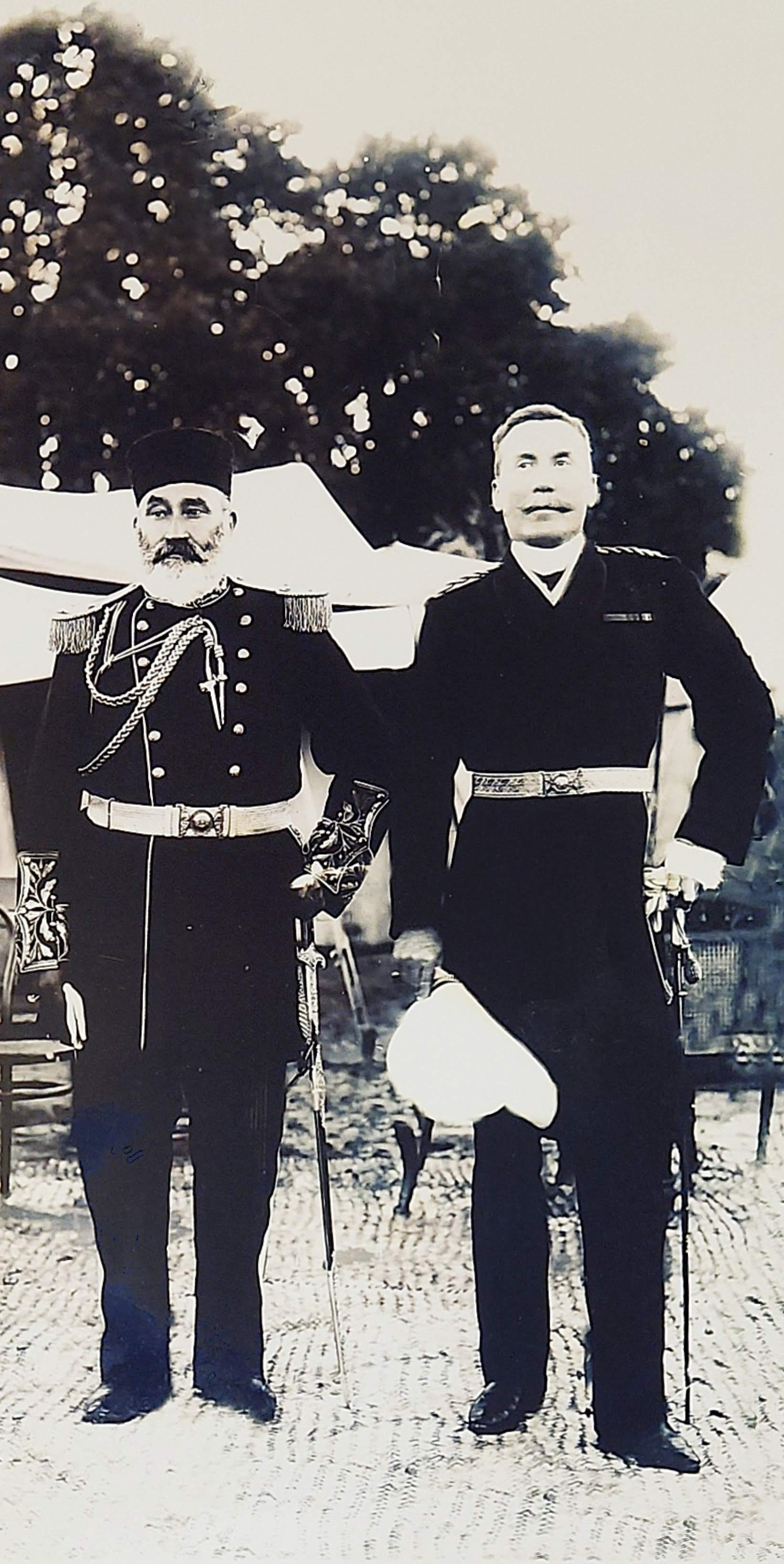
Sardar Abdul Wahab Khan and Sir Louis William Dane in Kabul c. 1904-1905

In 1904, the Dane Mission, named for his leadership, was sent by the British to Afghanistan to negotiate the friendship agreement with the country's new Amir, Habibullah Khan. The mission resulted in a reinforcement of the agreements between the British and Abdur Rahman Khan, Habibullah's father and predecessor as Amir. Afghanistan was a key player in The Great Game, and Dane's mission confirmed Britain's control over Afghanistan's foreign policy, and therefore gave the British the upper hand over the Russians.

In 1908, he was appointed Lieutenant-governor in the Punjab, a post from which he retired in 1913. Upon completion in 1913, the dam on Namal Lake in the Namal valley in Mianwali District, Punjab, Pakistan was subsequently named Dane Dam in his honor.

== Football ==
In 1928, Dane led a consortium of businessmen to found Thames A.F.C, following the construction of West Ham Stadium in the same year. In an interview with the Stratford Express, published on 1 August 1928, Dane said he believed West Ham Stadium, which had a capacity of 120,000, was "a wonderful stadium – one of the finest in the Country". Despite the Thames' facilities and the signing of former First Division players, such as Jimmy Dimmock and Henry White, the club never caught the imagination of the public, with the club setting a record low Football League attendance of 469 for a game against Luton Town on 6 December 1930. By 1932, following repeated poor finishes in the Third Division South, financial pressure and low attendances, Thames were wound up.

== Caxton Hall shooting ==
On 13 March 1940, Dane was one of four victims of a shooting at the Caxton Hall by Indian nationalist Udham Singh. Dane's successor (in 1913) as lieutenant-governor of the Punjab, Michael O'Dwyer, was killed instantly. Dane's arm was broken by a bullet; Lawrence Dundas, formerly Secretary of State for India and Charles Cochrane, formerly governor of the Bombay presidency were slightly injured.

== Death ==
Dane died at his home in South Kensington, London, on 22 February 1946. He is buried at Southampton Old Cemetery.
