= Mohammad Musa Shafiq =

Afghan politician and poet

Muḥammad Mūsá Shafīq
- محمد موسی شفيق

Prime Minister of Afghanistan
- In office 12 December 1972 – 17 July 1973
- Monarch: Mohammed Zahir Shah
- Preceded by: Abdul Zahir
- Succeeded by: Mohammad Daud Khan

Personal details
- Born: 1932 Kabul, Kingdom of Afghanistan
- Died: 1979 (aged 46–47) Kabul, Democratic Republic of Afghanistan
- Resting place: Unknown
- Party: Independent
- Education: Al-Azhar University, Columbia University
- Occupation: Politician, poet

Muḥammad Mūsā Shafīq (Pashto: محمد موسی شفيق; 1932–1979) was Prime Minister of Afghanistan for eight months. He was an Afghan politician and poet. He became Foreign Minister in 1971 and Prime Minister in December 1972. He lost both positions when Mohammed Zahir Shah was overthrown on July 17, 1973. He survived throughout the regime of Mohammed Daoud Khan, but was arrested after the 1978 communist coup d'état and executed along with many other anti-communist politicians in 1979.

== Early life ==
Mohammad Musa Shafiq was born in Kama district, Nangarhar province, Afghanistan in 1932. Son of prominent Afghan politician, civil servant and religious leader Mawlawi Mohammad Ibraheem Kamavi.

== Education ==
Mohammad Musa Shafiq was graduated from Kabul Arabic Religious High School. He earned his Master's degree from Al-Azhar University in Egypt after which he earned an additional Master's degree from Columbia University in New York, United States of America.

The last prime minister under the monarchy, Muhammad Musa Shafiq (1972-1973) appeared to many, in both the modernizing government camp and the traditional Islamic camp, to embody the compromise jurist who would ease the problem of shari'a versus statutory law. Shafiq had trained with a mawlawi and then had studied at the Shari'at Faculty, followed by al-Azhar and then Columbia University, where he studied Islamic and comparative law. His career was cut short by the Da'ud coup of 1973, and he was taken from arrest to execution by the Nur Muhammad Taraki regime.

— Ralph H. Magnus & Eden Naby, "Traditional Afghan Islam", Afghanistan: Mullah, Marx, and Mujahid (2002)

== Prime minister ==
As Prime Minister, Shafiq supported reforms of the largely conservative society of Afghanistan. He also sought closer ties with the United States and promised a crack-down on opium growing and smuggling. Other than that, he was also responsible for solving the then ongoing water dispute with Iran on diplomatic terms. Shafiq was prime Minister for seven months.
