= Mohammad Nur Ahmad Etemadi =

Afghan diplomat and politician

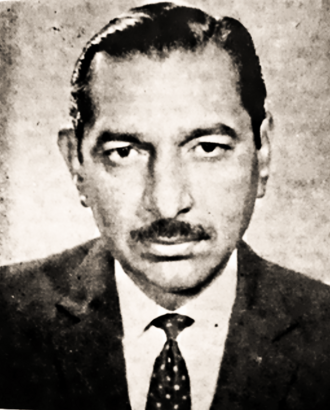

Prime Minister of Afghanistan
- In office 1 November 1967 – 9 June 1971
- Monarch: Mohammad Zahir Shah
- Preceded by: Abdullah Yaqta (acting)
- Succeeded by: Abdul Zahir

Personal details
- Born: 22 February 1921 Kandahar, Emirate of Afghanistan
- Died: 16 September 1979 (aged 58) Kabul, Democratic Republic of Afghanistan
- Party: Independent

Mohammad Nur Ahmad Etemadi (22 February 1921 – 16 September 1979) was an Afghan diplomat and politician.

Etemadi was born in Kandahar, Afghanistan. He served as ambassador to Pakistan for the first time from 1964 to 1965. He was appointed Foreign Minister in 1965 and became Prime Minister of Afghanistan on 1 November 1967. Due to a failure to improve the stagnating economy, he lost both positions on 9 June 1971 and was named ambassador to Italy. Unlike many politicians who were prominent under the rule of Mohammad Zahir Shah, Etemadi remained in the government after the 1973 coup in which a republic was established under the rule of Mohammad Daoud Khan. Etemadi left Italy and served as ambassador to the Soviet Union until 1976. He then had a second stint as ambassador to Pakistan, until the Communist coup of 1978.

Etemadi returned to Afghanistan and was arrested by the Communist government. In 1979, along with many other officials in the Zahir Shah and Daud Khan governments, including former prime minister Mohammad Musa Shafiq, Etemadi was executed.

== Resignation ==
Political offices
Preceded by Abdullah Yaqta; Acting	Prime Minister of Afghanistan; 1967–1971	Succeeded by Abdul Zahir
