= 1990 in Afghanistan =

- Decades: 1970s; 1980s; 1990s; 2000s; 2010s
- See also: Other events of 1990; List of years in Afghanistan

The following lists events that happened during 1990 in Afghanistan.

Fierce fighting flares anew at the beginning of the year between government troops and the mujaheddin guerrillas, but by winter no military victory is in sight for either side. In the face of an extended stalemate and in a bid to end the 12-year-old war, Washington and Moscow agree that elections should be held to decide the political future of the country. Neither superpower can agree on what role Najibullah would play in the interim government, however. Washington insists he relinquish control over the military and intelligence, a demand that Najibullah and Moscow reject. Nevertheless, the president is willing to relinquish control of the state media and a limited number of troops to an interim commission if new elections are held. Since their withdrawal after a nine-year intervention, the Soviets have sent an estimated $500 million in weapons and supplies to Kabul every month. The U.S. have funneled $300 million in aid to the Muslim resistance through Pakistan, but Washington lobbies for reduced aid to fundamentalist Gulbuddin Hekmatyar, considered the most anti-Western of all the seven resistance leaders, after numerous reports blamed him for brutal infighting that killed scores of Afghan civilians and guerrilla fighters. Pakistan's Prime Minister Benazir Bhutto also seeks a reduced role for the rebel leader, contradicting the Pakistani military's policy of favouring Hekmatyar for most of the civil war. But arms shipments to Hekmatyar reportedly rise dramatically after Bhutto is ousted August 6 and replaced by right-wing opponents. Renewed arms shipments coincide with escalating rocket attacks on Kabul in the first two weeks of October that kill at least 60 people and injure scores of others.

== Incumbents ==
- President: Mohammad Najibullah
- Chairman of the Council of Ministers: Sultan Ali Keshtmand (until 8 May), Fazal Haq Khaliqyar (starting 8 May)
- Vice Presidents: Abdul Rahim Hatif, Mohammed Rafie, Abdul Hamid Mohtat, Abdul Wahed Sorabi and Sultan Ali Keshtmand

== Early March 1990 ==
Defense Minister Lt. Gen. Shahnawaz Tanay, with the alleged support of the air force and some divisions of the army, leads an unsuccessful coup attempt against Najibullah's government.

== May 8, 1990 ==
Fazal Haq Khaliqyar replaces Keshtmand as prime minister.

== May 20, 1990 ==
The state of emergency is lifted.

== End of May 1990 ==
A loya jirga is convened in Kabul, which ratifies constitutional amendments providing for multiple political parties, ending the PDPA's and the National Front's monopoly over executive power.

== June 1990 ==
Najibullah creates a new political party, the Hezb-i-Wattan, or Homeland Party, in an attempt to whip up mass support. The announcement turns out to be a largely cosmetic exercise, however, as all top posts go to stalwarts from his old PDPA.

== July 1990 ==
Major guerrilla leaders form a Commanders' Council in Pakistan. It is seen as a deliberate attempt to sideline the moribund government-in-exile originally established as an alternative to Najibullah but later dismissed as a sham. The ethnic squabbles in the government-in-exile have reportedly contributed to the U.S.-backed guerrillas' failure to dislodge the Kabul government.

== October 1990 ==
After a lull in fighting, the Pakistan-based guerrillas stage a fresh assault and claim to have captured strategic outposts in the south and the capitals of Tarin Kowt and Qalat in Oruzgan and Zabol provinces. The guerrillas also step up fighting around the capital city of Kabul and in at least four other provinces. The latest offensive, led by Hekmatyar, is viewed as a prelude to a major attack on Kabul. Most moderate guerrilla leaders, however, seem to oppose an attack on Kabul, saying they have neither the equipment nor the manpower to overcome the government's overwhelming air power.

== Early October 1990 ==
The 40 major guerrilla commanders meet in northern Pakistan and agree to set aside their ethnic differences and draw up an overall coordinated strategy to counter Hekmatyar.

== November 1990 ==
It is reported that guerrillas have killed more than 200 government soldiers after the soldiers had surrendered.

== Sports ==
On December 2, 1990, at the California International Marathon in Sacramento, California, Waheed Karim set an Afghan national record in the marathon (2:28:46).
