= 1991 in Afghanistan =

- Decades: 1970s; 1980s; 1990s; 2000s; 2010s
- See also: Other events of 1991; List of years in Afghanistan

The following lists events that happened during 1991 in Afghanistan.

President Mohammad Najibullah, whom the U.S. government predicted would not last the summer when Soviet troops pulled out of Afghanistan in February 1989, continues to rule his war-wracked nation from a precarious position. A Moscow-brokered plan calls for Najibullah to step aside in favor of Prime Minister Khaliqyar, who would serve as a transitional administrative leader until a new government could be elected. However, on October 13 moderate guerrilla officials in Pakistan highlight the remaining obstacles to peace by withdrawing their support for Khaliqyar. The mujaheddin say his association with Najibullah makes him unacceptable. Afghanistan is like a maimed patient after 13 years of civil war. The streets of Kabul are full of one-legged men, victims of land mines. The government says it has released more than 19,000 prisoners in the past four years and has abolished the special tribunals set up to try those accused of political crimes. Meanwhile, fierce fighting continues between government troops and the Muslim guerrillas. The guerrillas launch their long-planned assault on Najibullah's hometown, the garrison town of Gardez in southeastern Afghanistan, and coordinate a series of attacks aimed at demoralizing the Afghan Army and destabilizing the government, but none of the attacks is decisive. In 1991 the guerrillas control 6 of Afghanistan's 31 provinces. In their only major gain during the year, they overrun a series of government-held garrisons to gain control of strategic areas along the border with the breakaway Soviet republics of Turkmenistan, Uzbekistan, and Tajikistan. They also hold the narrow corridor linking Afghanistan with China.

== Incumbents ==
- President: Mohammad Najibullah
- Chairman of the Council of Ministers: Fazal Haq Khaliqyar
- Vice Presidents: Abdul Rahim Hatif, Mohammed Rafie, Abdul Hamid Mohtat, Abdul Wahed Sorabi and Sultan Ali Keshtmand

== September 1991 ==
Najibullah proposes a five-point peace plan to end the 13-year war that has killed an estimated 1.5 million people and maimed hundreds of thousands of others. The plan calls for an end to weapons shipments to the warring factions, a cease-fire, and an intra-Afghan dialogue leading to the formation of a national unity government mandated to oversee elections. The national unity government would share power with the Pakistan-based government-in-exile, guerrilla commanders, Afghans living in exile, and the deposed king, Zahir Shah. Besides organizing elections, it would rewrite Afghanistan's constitution and oversee the return of the more than five million refugees who had fled to Pakistan and Iran. However, the Muslim guerrillas accuse Najibullah of merely repackaging old ideas in order to portray himself as a peacemaker. Most of the guerrillas vow to continue fighting until he is overthrown.

=== September ===
In a surprise move, the government restores the citizenship of Zahir Shah, who has been living in virtual banishment in Italy for 18 years. Nearly 77, Zahir Shah had been overthrown in 1973, and he and his family were stripped of their Afghan citizenship after the Communist revolution of 1978. Zahir Shah is under pressure from the Western countries (including the United States) not to respond to Najibullah's call for National Reconciliation because if Zahir Shah returns to Afghanistan and joins the government, most of the traditionalist mujahideen would quit fighting against the government and would probably join the government.

In mid-September the U.S. and the Soviet Union take the first step toward a negotiated settlement by agreeing to end arms shipments to their respective clients, the rebels and the government in Kabul, as of January 1, 1992.

== Sports ==
On March 2, 1991, in San Diego, California, Waheed Karim set an Afghan national record in the 5,000 meters (16:04.7).
