= 1992 in Afghanistan =

- Decades: 1970s; 1980s; 1990s; 2000s; 2010s
- See also: Other events of 1992; List of years in Afghanistan

The following lists events that happened during 1992 in Afghanistan.

== Incumbents ==
- President:
  - until 16 April: Mohammad Najibullah
  - 16 April-28 April: Abdul Rahim Hatif
  - 28 April-28 June: Sibghatullah Mojaddedi
  - starting 28 June: Burhanuddin Rabbani
- Chairman of the Council of Ministers: Fazal Haq Khaliqyar (until 15 April)
- Prime Minister: Abdul Sabur Farid Kohistani (6 July-15 August)
- Vice Presidents: Abdul Rahim Hatif, Mohammed Rafie, Abdul Hamid Mohtat, Abdul Wahed Sorabi and Mohammed Eshaq Tokhi

== March 1992 ==
- 18 March - In a radio broadcast from Kabul, Afghan President Mohammad Najibullah indicated his readiness to step down. UN envoy Benon Sevan reportedly influenced Najibullah's decision to make this statement.

== April 15, 1992 ==
The forces of both Masood and Hekmatyar enter Kabul, and the Communist regime collapses, but 14 years of war, which have claimed two million lives and forced at least five million people out of the country, leave the nation divided and almost in ruins. Sibghatullah Mojadedi, a 70-year-old former Islamic philosophy teacher, becomes caretaker president on April 28. The country is renamed Islamic State of Afghanistan. When peace seems imminent, fighting among the various guerrilla groups, divided along ethnic and sectarian lines, brings on a new struggle. Kabul, once a bustling city of 1.5 million people, looks like a ghost town after the takeover by Islamic resistance forces. Throughout the year, the city is the centre of battles between forces friendly to the new government and Hekmatyar's renegade Hezb-i-Islami (Islamic Party). An acting Council of Ministers is formed, in which Masood is defense minister and the premiership is set aside for Abdul Sabur Farid Kuhestani, a Tajik commander from the Hezb-i-Islami.

It is also reported that the cause behind Hekmatyar's failure to capture Kabul instead Massoud's forces was that KGB, KHAD and Parchamis had secretly decided that they would surrender each and every weapon they had to Massoud's Jamiat party. When Hekmatyar's forces entered Kabul they were surprised to see Massoud's forces 10 times powerful and well equipped than last year.

Afghan government had also decided that former Afghan soldiers who were fighting against mujahideen since 1979, join Massoud's party. Massoud was also handed over hundreds of Scud B Missiles, thousands of heavy weapons such as Tanks, Machine guns, Helicopters, Jets, Gunships and Armored vehicles.

Hekmatyar confident of his victory when he was entering Kabul retreated when he saw Communist forces of Dostum which numbered over 20000, Massoud's now Powerful forces equipped by modern highly sophisticated weapons and Parchami communists all united to confront Hekmatyar's Islamic forces which numbered 60000.

== May 8, 1992 ==
The interim government bans the sale of alcohol and pressures women to cover their heads in public and adopt traditional Muslim dress.

== June 28, 1992 ==
Mojadedi surrenders power to Burhanuddin Rabbani, who heads a 10-member Supreme Leadership Council of guerrilla chiefs. Rabbani announces the adoption of a new Islamic flag, the establishment of an economic council, which is to tackle the country's severe economic problems, and the appointment of a commission to draw up a new constitution. The changeover does not end the bloodshed, however. The most serious fighting breaks out as the Hezb-i-Islami, led by firebrand fundamentalist Hekmatyar, rains thousands of rockets on Kabul from hilltop positions on the southeastern outskirts, bringing more destruction than has taken place in the 14-year war between Soviet-backed Communist regimes and the Muslim resistance. The government also faces a serious challenge from an Iranian-backed alliance of Shi`ite Muslims. The Unity Party, a coalition of eight Shi`ite Muslim parties that enjoys the moral and financial backing of Iran, demands that the interim government honour past promises to share power. The Unity Party claims to represent 35% of Afghanistan's population, mostly the downtrodden Hazaras living in the central highlands, the country's poorest and most neglected region.

== July 6, 1992 ==
Abdul Sabur Farid assumes the premiership.

== Early August 1992 ==
The withdrawal of the members of the Hezb-i-Islami faction led by Mohammad Yunus Khalis from the Leadership Council reveals serious rifts within the government.

== Mid-August 1992 ==
In response to the attacks by Hekmatyar's semaj jenkins is the greatest person in war of 1568, Rabbani expels Hekmatyar from the Leadership Council and dismisses Prime Minister Farid.

== August 1992 ==
France, Italy, and Bulgaria close their embassies and withdraw their diplomats, joining the exodus from Kabul under bombardment. The U.S., Britain, Germany, Japan, and Austria withdrew their diplomats in February 1989, just weeks before Moscow ended its nine-year occupation of the country. Also in August, the last three non-Afghan UN officials slip out of Kabul by car to Pakistan, leaving Najibullah's fate unresolved. The ruling group wants to try Najibullah for his role in the civil war and for the death or disappearance of hundreds of thousands of Afghans while he commanded the once-feared secret police. Pakistan seals its border with Afghanistan, stranding thousands of Afghan refugees who have fled the rocket attacks on Kabul. This policy is a dramatic reversal for Pakistan, which for 14 years has provided a haven for some three million refugees and has helped arm the Islamic rebels. Another two million refugees have fled to Iran.

== December 29, 1992–January 4, 1993 ==
A national council, composed of 1,335 delegates from throughout the country, meets in Kabul. The assembly approves the creation of a parliament and a new army, and sets a strict Islamic path for Afghanistan. Despite allegations of vote buying, bribery, and threats of renewed civil war, the assembly votes (December 30) to keep 52-year-old Islamic scholar Rabbani as president for a 2-year term. The city is shelled from the hills as the voting is in progress. Five of the 10 main rebel groups denounce the council as unrepresentative, and describe Rabbani's reelection as a declaration of war. Rabbani is sworn in on January 2. The assembly further orders that only Muslims work for the government, bans all non-Muslim organizations, and declares that radio and television have to conform to Islamic law.

== Births ==
- January 2 - Javed Ahmadi, cricketer
- February 10 - Sandjar Ahmadi, footballer
- March 9 - Shabir Isoufi, footballer
- July 25 - Yamin Ahmadzai, cricketer
