= 1986 in Afghanistan =

- Decades: 1960s; 1970s; 1980s; 1990s; 2000s
- See also: Other events of 1986; List of years in Afghanistan

The following lists events that happened during 1986 in Afghanistan.

== Incumbents ==
- General Secretary of the People's Democratic Party of Afghanistan: Babrak Karmal (until 4 May), Mohammad Najibullah (starting 4 May)
- Chairman of the Revolutionary Council: Babrak Karmal (until 24 November), Haji Mohammad Chamkani (starting 24 November)
- Chairman of the Council of Ministers: Sultan Ali Keshtmand

== Events ==
Soviet general secretary Mikhail Gorbachev announces that soviet troops will be withdrawn from Afghanistan by the end of 1988. The withdrawal of troops begins on October 15. Gorbachev's offer is made from Siberia and is part of a much wider Soviet initiative in Asia. The withdrawal brings sharp reactions: the U.S. dismisses it as "inadequate" and suggests it is no more than a normal rotation of troops; Afghan resistance groups reject it as a "bluff," while Pakistan sees it as a small but positive move. Strategic analysts say the withdrawal has no military significance since three of the six units are air-defense regiments and the Afghan resistance has no air capability. The regiments constitute only a little over 6% of an estimated 120,000 Soviet troops in Afghanistan. The war continues unabated, with multiple clashes between Soviet-backed Afghan troops and the resistance. Claims of success are made by both sides, but they are impossible to verify. A number of major offensives are launched during the year. Toward the end of 1986, the resistance fighters begin to receive more and better weapons from the outside world - particularly from the United States, the United Kingdom, and China - via Pakistan, the most important of these being shoulder-fired ground-to-air missiles. The Soviet and Afghan air forces then begin to suffer considerable casualties.

=== February 1986 ===
A report by the U.S. State Department states that the war has resulted in "one of the greatest mass migrations in history" and that Kabul's population has more than doubled to two million. "More than five million have been uprooted, nearly four million of them becoming refugees abroad ... In large areas of the countryside where resistance is active, wartime conditions and longstanding animosities among competing tribal groups have led to multiple taxation, arbitrary detention, and outright banditry." The resistance shoots down several military aircraft in Herat province; the reported death toll is 200.

=== April 1986 ===
700 resistance fighters are killed in Paktia province.

=== May, July, and August 1986 ===
Karmal resigns as general secretary of the PDPA, retaining the less important position of Chairman of the Revolutionary Council. The resignation is officially attributed to reasons of health - he has made no public appearance since March 30 and is reported to have been in the U.S.S.R. for medical treatment. It is widely thought, however, that the Soviet leadership is dissatisfied with his performance and wants to create a broader power base. His successor, new general secretary Mohammad Najibullah, was formerly head of Khad, the country's secret police, and more recently took charge of security.

Government troops clash with resistance soldiers in Badakhshan province, leaving 200 Soviet-Afghan soldiers and "dozens" of resistance soldiers dead. Also in July 120 government troops died during an ambush on a military convoy in Zabol province.

A massive explosion destroys an ammunition dump in the headquarters of the Afghan Army's 8th Division near Kabul, reportedly killing up to 100 people.

For the fifth consecutive year, UN-sponsored talks are held in Geneva between Afghanistan and Pakistan with the object of ending the military presence in Kabul. None of the meetings produce any concrete results, though differences between the two countries have narrowed since the talks began in 1982. Discussions continue through diplomatic channels, and in December a UN spokesman announces that agreement has been reached on the monitoring of Soviet troop withdrawals. The remaining stumbling block is the timetable for a total withdrawal, with Pakistan insisting that this should take place as soon as technically feasible.

=== September 1986 ===
A national reconciliation campaign is approved by the Politburo, including a unilateral six-month cease-fire to begin on January 15, 1987, but it meets with little response inside Afghanistan and is rejected by resistance leaders in Pakistan.

=== November 1986 ===
A UN human rights report reports that 10,000 to 12,000 Afghan civilians have been killed in the previous nine months by Soviet and Afghan government forces, and that children have been killed by the indiscriminate use of explosives disguised as toys. The "continuation of the military solution," the report says, "will lead to a situation approaching genocide." The same month the UN General Assembly passes a resolution, by a vote of 122 to 20, calling for a negotiated settlement to the war. Karmal resigns from the largely ceremonial post of Chairman of the Revolutionary Council. He is succeeded on November 24 by Haji Mohammad Chamkani, formerly first vice-chairman and a non-PDPA member.

=== December 1986 ===
An extraordinary plenum of the PDPA Central Committee approves a policy of national reconciliation, involving negotiations with opposition groups, and the proposed formation of a coalition government of national unity. A cabinet reshuffle sees the elevation of Najibullah supporters Abdul Wakil and Mohammad Rafi to the posts of foreign minister and defense minister, respectively. Najibullah visits the U.S.S.R. to discuss prospects for ending the conflict in Afghanistan.
