= 1981 in Afghanistan =

- Decades: 1960s; 1970s; 1980s; 1990s; 2000s
- See also: Other events of 1981; List of years in Afghanistan

The following lists events that happened during 1981 in Afghanistan.

The stalemate in the Afghan crisis continues throughout the year. Babrak Karmal's government rejects negotiations except on its own terms, and the Soviets show no desire to withdraw or reduce their military presence. Rebel resistance against the Soviet presence intensifies throughout the country, despite all-out efforts by the 85,000-strong Soviet force and the Afghan Army to curb it. There are reports of widespread fighting between the Mujahideen (Islamic guerrillas) and the security forces in vast areas stretching from Kandahar in the south to Badakhshan on the Soviet border. The presence of rebels brings reprisals from the Soviet forces, and helicopter gunship and artillery attacks devastate several villages. Although there are no official estimates, Soviet casualties are also believed to be heavy. Although Pakistan denies the allegation, there is said to be evidence of a regular arms flow to the Mujahideen inside Afghanistan from across the border. During this year, the country and the USSR made a trade agreement for 1981 to 1985. Afghanistan shall provide the USSR with food, natural gas and raw materials while the USSR will provide machinery and industrial materials.

== Incumbents ==
- General Secretary of the People's Democratic Party of Afghanistan: Babrak Karmal
- Chairman of the Revolutionary Council: Babrak Karmal
- Chairman of the Council of Ministers: Babrak Karmal (until 11 June), Sultan Ali Keshtmand (starting 11 June)

== February 1981 ==
Karmal visits Moscow, where he signs a series of agreements, mainly economic, with Soviet leaders. The Afghan economy is moving further and further into the orbit of the Soviet bloc, which takes most of its exports in return for food grains and consumer goods.

== March 1981 ==
According to UN statistics, 1.7 million Afghans have so far fled to Pakistan and some 400,000 to Iran in order to escape the strife in their country.

== June 1981 ==
General Secretary Karmal gives up the post of prime minister; he is succeeded in that position on June 11 by Sultan Ali Keshtmand, another trusted member of the Parcham faction of the PDPA. Keshtmand is also put in direct charge of the National Patriotic Front, set up in December 1980 with the intention of rallying the people behind Karmal's Marxist revolutionary government.

== August 25, 1981 ==
Karmal announces a new set of proposals for negotiations with Pakistan and Iran, either separately or together; this is a slight departure from proposals he made in May and in December 1980. The democratic revolutionary government of Afghanistan, he says, will be prepared to hold tripartite talks with Pakistan and Iran under the aegis of UN Secretary-General Kurt Waldheim or his representative. The government wants a political settlement that would ensure "a full and reliable end to armed and other interference from outside into Afghanistan's internal affairs, and the creation of conditions under which such interference would be excluded in future." The Soviet troops could withdraw if such international guarantees were given and implemented. Iran, itself going through a period of internal chaos, reacts negatively to the Kabul proposal, while Pakistan at first considers it "flexible" and later rejects it. Pakistan maintains its earlier stand that any direct negotiation with a representative of the Karmal government would amount to recognition of the regime, contrary to the ruling of the Islamic Conference.

== September 1981 ==
During the General Assembly session, UN Secretary-General Waldheim and Javier Pérez de Cuéllar, UN special representative for Afghanistan, have separate discussions with the Afghan Foreign Minister Shah Mohammad Dost and Pakistan's Foreign Minister Agha Shahi. Efforts to bring the two parties together with or without the presence of a UN representative do not succeed, though it is agreed that Pérez de Cuéllar will continue his mediation efforts. The New York meetings are a consequence of a November 1980 General Assembly resolution that called for withdrawal of foreign troops from Afghanistan and appealed to all parties to create conditions for a political solution.
