= 1984 in Afghanistan =

- Decades: 1960s; 1970s; 1980s; 1990s; 2000s
- See also: Other events of 1984; List of years in Afghanistan

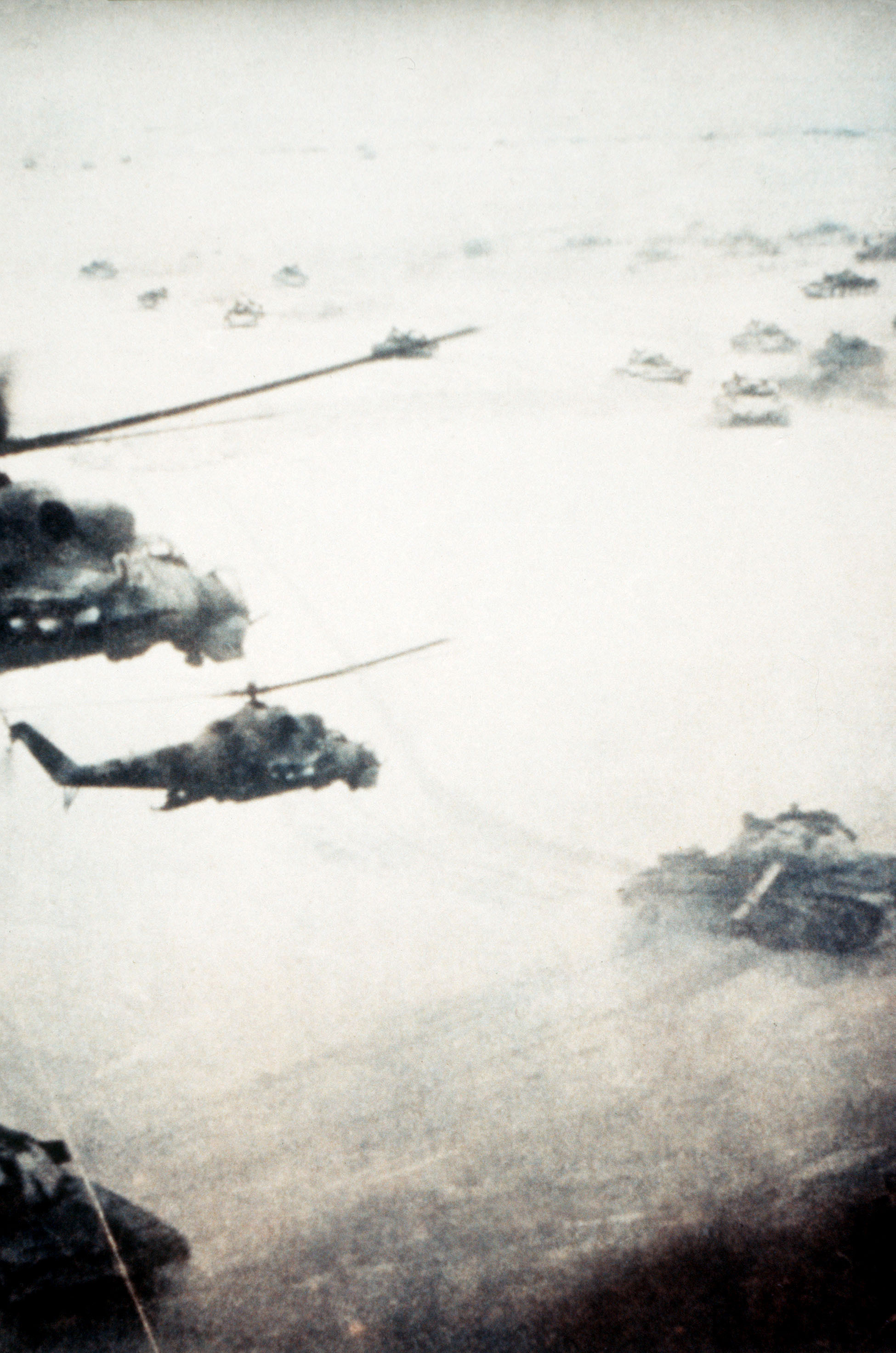
Soviet fighter tanks and helicopters in Afghanistan in 1984

The following lists events that happened during 1984 in Afghanistan.

Resistance against the Soviet-backed government increases sharply during the year. Afghanistan continues to be dependent on the USSR for military aid, food supplies, fuel, and even medical treatment for its leaders. Afghanistan's relations with the West remain strained, and its relations with Asian nations, with the exception of India, show no visible improvement. After five years of Soviet military presence, the nation is slowly but steadily becoming a satellite of Moscow.

== Incumbents ==
- General Secretary of the People's Democratic Party of Afghanistan: Babrak Karmal
- Chairman of the Revolutionary Council: Babrak Karmal
- Chairman of the Council of Ministers: Sultan Ali Keshtmand

== January 1, 1984 ==
New draft laws are proclaimed under which all Afghan youths over 18 years of age are to be conscripted into the Army. The move is seen as part of a desperate attempt to check the depletion of the Army, which has fallen to 30,000-40,000 personnel from 80,000 to 90,000 before the Soviet invasion.

== January 2, 1984 ==
The U.S.S.R. rejects a UN resolution demanding the withdrawal of foreign troops from Afghanistan. The resolution, which did not name the U.S.S.R. directly, was co-sponsored by 44 countries and adopted in the General Assembly the previous November.

== January 10, 1984 ==
Heavy fighting is reported from Kandahar, Afghanistan's second largest city. According to some sources, over 100 troops are killed in the operation, but the city remains under insurgent control. The Afghan media denies these reports.

== February 1, 1984 ==
Radio Kabul claims successes against the insurgents, reporting that 600 "bandits" - the official term for insurgents - have been killed during January.

== April and July 1984 ==
In the continuing battle for control of the strategic Panjsher Valley near Kabul, the government launches major offensives, claiming on each occasion that it has cleared the valley of rebels, though the claim is disputed by Western diplomats and by subsequent events. Independent reports put casualties among Soviet and Afghan troops during the July 18–24 offensive at 2,000, with the insurgents and valley residents suffering equally.

== July 9–August 3, 1984 ==
Karmal is in Moscow for "medical treatment".

== July and August 1984 ==
Pakistan claims that air and artillery attacks on Pakistan from Afghanistan have killed some 100 people. The allegation is promptly denied by Kabul, but Pakistan-based foreign journalists taken on a tour of the affected areas confirm the attacks. The affair heats up when the U.S. State Department issues a statement on August 24 "deploring the attacks on Pakistan".

== Late August 1984 ==
The most important diplomatic development of the year takes place in Geneva, where talks are held under UN auspices. Afghan Foreign Minister Dost and his Pakistani counterpart Khan do not meet face to face but hold negotiations through Cordovez. Nothing concrete emerges from the talks, however; UN officials refuse to comment, except to say privately that another round of discussions will be held later, possibly in 1985. The three main items under discussions are international guarantees of Afghanistan's security, the return to Afghanistan of the approximately 4.5 million refugees from Pakistan and Iran, and withdrawal of more than 100,000 Soviet troops from Afghanistan.

== August 31, 1984 ==
A bomb explodes outside the international airport at Kabul, killing 13 people and wounding 207. Karmal accuses Pakistan of masterminding the incident.

== November 1984 ==
Western diplomats say the Soviets are sending Afghan children to the Soviet Union for ten years of indoctrination. However, there is no independent confirmation of the report.

== December 3, 1984 ==
Abdul Qadir is replaced as defense minister by Nazar Mohammad.
