= 1985 in Afghanistan =

- Decades: 1960s; 1970s; 1980s; 1990s; 2000s
- See also: Other events of 1985; List of years in Afghanistan

Locked in a military stalemate in the Soviet-Afghan War (1979–1989), with neither the Muslim insurgents nor the Soviet-backed government troops mounting any decisive military action, 1985 was characterized by numerous operations and clashes. The insurgents appeared better equipped than previously, demonstrating new antiaircraft weaponry, which they used in their efforts to counter government forces, who are aided by an estimated 115,000 Soviet soldiers. Afghanistan remains completely dependent on Moscow, and at this point, an estimated half of the population has been displaced by the war.

The following lists events that happened during 1985 in Afghanistan.

== Incumbents ==
- General Secretary of the People's Democratic Party of Afghanistan: Babrak Karmal
- Chairman of the Revolutionary Council: Babrak Karmal
- Chairman of the Council of Ministers: Sultan Ali Keshtmand

== 1985 ==
Afghanistan produces 31% of the world's opium, according to the UN Office for Drug Control and Crime Prevention.

== January 1985 ==
Soviet-Afghan troops launch an offensive in the provinces of Konarha, Nangarhar, and Paktia in eastern Afghanistan and Nimruz and Herat in the west, part of a move designed to cut off guerrilla supply routes.

== January 10, 1985 ==
PDpA general secretary Karmal announces that membership of the ruling Communist Party has increased from 16,000 at the time it came to power to 120,000. On the same day, Afghanistan marks the 20th anniversary of the party's founding.

== March 1985 ==
A UN report on human rights in Afghanistan accuses Soviet forces of bombarding villages, destroying food supplies, massacring civilians, and disregarding the Geneva convention. The report claims that the government is holding 50,000 political prisoners and that tortures in jails are "commonplace." The government rejects the claims as "fabrication."

== March 23, 1985 ==
According to resistance sources in Pakistan, some 400 Soviet and Afghan troops are killed when a series of chain-reaction explosions triggered by a time bomb engulfs a military convoy at Ollamd, near the Salang tunnel.

== April 1985 ==
Western diplomats claim that several hundred civilians have been killed in late March during Soviet-Afghan attacks in the provinces of Laghman in the east, Qonduz and Samangan in the north, and Herat.

== April 23–25, 1985 ==
A three-day Loya Jirga (grand council) is attended by 1,796 delegates. This traditional national tribal assembly had not been convened since the 1979 coup.

== May 1985 ==
Pressure from the Pakistanis, from outside supporters, and from the guerrilla commanders force the seven major resistance groups based in Peshawar to form an alliance. Inside Afghanistan, neighbouring ethnolinguistically oriented resistance groups unite for military and political purposes within their various regions. Internal struggles for leadership also occur in certain areas where the Soviets have little influence, such as Hazarajat and Nurestan. Although no national liberation front exists, the resistance groups begin to feel that they are part of an overall effort to liberate Afghanistan.

== June 12, 1985 ==
At least 20 Afghan Air Force planes are blown up at Shindand air base in the western province of Farah.

== June, August, and September 1985 ==
The UN special representative for Afghanistan, Cordovez, shuttles between separate rooms in the UN building in Geneva, meeting alternately with Afghan Foreign Minister Dost and his Pakistani counterpart, Khan. The foreign ministers do not meet directly, since to do so would amount to recognition by Pakistan of Karmal's regime. Iran once again boycotts the talks but is kept informed. The last round of talks adjourns on December 19 to allow the parties to study new UN proposals. Earlier, the U.S. announced its willingness to act as guarantor of a settlement that would involve Soviet troop withdrawal and an end to U.S. aid to the guerrillas.

== August 1985 ==
Foreign Minister Dost visits India, the only country outside the Soviet bloc with which relations improve during the year.

== Mid-August 1985 ==
An anti-guerrilla onslaught is launched by the joint Soviet-Afghan military command in eastern Afghanistan but falls far short of success. However, the offensive, described by area experts as among the biggest since the Soviet intervention in 1979, brings the war closer to the Pakistani border, a fact that worries Islamabad.

== September 4, 1985 ==
An Afghan airliner traveling from Kabul to Farah crashes near Kandahar, killing all 52 people on board. The government blames the guerrillas for the incident.
