= 1983 in Afghanistan =

- Decades: 1960s; 1970s; 1980s; 1990s; 2000s
- See also: Other events of 1983; List of years in Afghanistan

The following lists events that happened during 1983 in Afghanistan.

The Muslim insurgency remains locked in military stalemate against Soviet and Afghan troops. The government controls the cities, while the guerrillas control the countryside. There are conflicting reports on the success of the regime in either neutralizing the insurgency movement or crushing it with the aid of some 110,000 Soviet troops. Reports on the war are sketchy and probably biased, since they are based on accounts given either by Pakistan-based rebel groups or by journalists taken on conducted tours by the government. General Secretary Karmal is firmly in command of the ruling PDPA. Infighting between the Parcham and Khalq factions of the party is less evident in 1983 than in previous years, and it appears that the Soviets have succeeded in bringing them under control. Afghanistan continues to depend on the Soviet Union for economic aid and food assistance.

== Incumbents ==
- General Secretary of the People's Democratic Party of Afghanistan: Babrak Karmal
- Chairman of the Revolutionary Council: Babrak Karmal
- Chairman of the Council of Ministers: Sultan Ali Keshtmand

== January 21–February 7, 1983 ==
Diego Cordovez, UN special representative for Afghanistan, holds consultations in Pakistan, Afghanistan, and Iran. He reports that the consultations centred on "substantive contents of a comprehensive settlement" and maintains that it is possible to widen the understanding reached at Geneva in June 1982. The interrelated elements of a comprehensive settlement are the withdrawal of foreign troops, international guarantees of noninterference and nonintervention, and arrangements for the return of Afghan refugees to Afghanistan.

== March 28, 1983 ==
Andropov, Soviet Foreign Minister Andrey Gromyko, and UN Secretary-General Pérez de Cuéllar hold talks in Moscow on ways of normalizing the situation in Afghanistan. No definite results emerge from the discussions, but the UN continues its efforts to find a political solution to the Afghan issue.

== June 24, 1983 ==
Seven days of talks sponsored by the UN on the withdrawal of Soviet troops end in Geneva with no sign of major progress on the issue. The talks were conducted by a UN negotiator who met separately and alternately with delegates from Pakistan and Afghanistan. Pakistan was involved in the talks because an estimated three million Afghan refugees had crossed into its territory and because the Soviet Union asserted that Pakistan was the main supporter of the Mujahideen and the major channel through which arms reached them. Iran, which by its own estimate houses 1.5 million Afghan refugees, boycotted the talks because it believed that no negotiations should be undertaken without the participation of the guerrillas.
