= 1989 in Afghanistan =

- Decades: 1960s; 1970s; 1980s; 1990s; 2000s
- See also: Other events of 1989; List of years in Afghanistan

The following lists events that happened during 1989 in Afghanistan.

== Incumbents ==
- President: Mohammad Najibullah
- Chairman of the Council of Ministers: Mohammad Hasan Sharq (until 21 February), Sultan Ali Keshtmand (starting 21 February)
- Vice Presidents: Abdul Rahim Hatif, Mohammed Rafie, Abdul Hamid Mohtat and Abdul Wahed Sorabi

== Events ==
=== February ===
- February 2 - Najibullah makes repeated offers to start a policy of national reconciliation, but rebel leaders reject them. Afghanistan's relations with Pakistan deteriorate further. Pakistan does not turn away refugees during the year, but the strain on its economy is increasing since other countries cut their contributions after the Soviet withdrawal. International relief agencies and government officials estimate that about 100,000 Afghans have returned home, but the flow is difficult to gauge because of the country's porous borders.
- February 15 - The last Soviet soldiers rides out of Afghanistan, ending a nine-year intervention that left 15,000 Soviet troops dead and that failed to defeat Muslim rebels seeking the government's overthrow. Predictions by Western governments that Najibullah's regime would fall as soon as the Soviets leave prove wrong. The former secret police chief shows himself to be a shrewd political infighter and deftly appeals to nationalistic sentiments in his war-ravaged nation. Three days after the Soviet pullout Najibullah declares a state of emergency, and on February 19 he replaces seven members of his cabinet who do not belong to the governing PDPA with party members, a move aimed at consolidating the party's powers. Prime Minister Sharq, another non-party member, resigns on February 20. Sultan Ali Keshtmand, a ranking member of the Politburo and a Communist hard-liner, is named prime minister on February 21 after a 21-member Supreme Defense Council headed by Najibullah effectively assumed power.
- February 23 - The Muslim rebels set up an interim government in Pakistan. After three weeks of fractious debate, an assembly of 440 delegates elects an interim government with Sibghatullah Mojadedi, considered a moderate, as president. Rasul Sayaf, a hard-line fundamentalist from the Ittehad-i-Islami rebel group, is elected prime minister. Afghan Shi`ite guerrillas, most of whom are in Iran, boycott the assembly after the Pakistan-based rebels, the majority of whom are Sunnites, refused to give them the representation they sought. The Shi`ites constitute only 17% of the Afghan population but make up 40% of the refugees, who provide many of the guerrillas. The rebel government is officially recognized by Saudi Arabia on March 9, and Bahrain, Malaysia, and The Sudan also announce their recognition. The U.S. and Pakistan, the rebels' main backers, withhold recognition until a functioning administration is established, but the U.S. names a special presidential envoy to the Afghanistan resistance, with the rank of ambassador.

=== July ===
- The Kabul regime successfully pushes back rebel forces from the strategic city of Jalalabad. Jalalabad, 70 km west of the Pakistani border, is the country's third largest city.

=== October ===
- A group of 15 former top officials and military officers, having formed what they call a third force to try to bridge the gap between Kabul and the guerrillas, issues a manifesto calling for an end to both Soviet and U.S. interference. Calling themselves the National Salvation Society, most of them served the deposed King Zahir Shah, and the government does not oppose the group because it might help lure the 74-year-old former monarch home from exile in Italy. The king is still a popular figure in Afghanistan, and his return might lend Najibullah the legitimacy he seeks at home and abroad. The king's return might also fracture the squabbling rebel alliance, since the leaders of the seven Pakistan-based rebel groups range from bitter antimonarchists to former palace advisers.

=== November ===
- November 1 - The UN General Assembly passes an unprecedented resolution calling on the Afghan government and the rebels to open negotiations to establish a coalition government.

=== December ===
- December 24: The Congress of People's Deputies of the Soviet Union declares the 1979 invasion of Afghanistan unconstitutional (Resolution no. 982-1), deeming it "a decision by a small circle of people taken in violation of the Soviet Constitution, which reserves such matters to jurisdiction of higher state institutions".
