= 1982 in Afghanistan =

- Decades: 1960s; 1970s; 1980s; 1990s; 2000s
- See also: Other events of 1982; List of years in Afghanistan

The following lists events that happened during 1982 in Afghanistan.

Fighting between the Mujahideen jihadists and the Afghan Army backed by Soviet forces is less widespread as the government appears to be in better control of the insurgency problem in general. Babrak Karmal, whose position has been considered shaky, is also firmly in command as his Parcham faction of the ruling PDPA manages to eliminate most of the pro-Khalq elements from the government and the party.

Diego Cordovez, UN special representative for Afghanistan, visits the capitals of Afghanistan, Pakistan, and Iran to convince their leaders of the necessity to find a peaceful settlement.

Clashes between insurgents and security forces are mainly centered on the Panjsher Valley, about 70 km northeast of Kabul. Bitter fighting takes place in this region during June–August. The Afghan Army and the Soviets commit numerous ground troops supported by helicopter gunships and MiG jet fighters to dislodge rebels from the valley. Rebel sources in Pakistan admit that the rebels have to take refuge in nearby mountains but insist that they are preparing to fight back. As a result of large-scale operations by Soviet and Afghan forces, Kandahar, in the south, also seems more secure. Western news agency reports estimate casualties in fighting since the Soviet intervention at 20,000 Afghan and 10,000 Soviet troops. Little is known about rebel losses.

== Incumbents ==
- General Secretary of the People's Democratic Party of Afghanistan: Babrak Karmal
- Chairman of the Revolutionary Council: Babrak Karmal
- Chairman of the Council of Ministers: Sultan Ali Keshtmand

== February 1982 ==
Karmal signs a trade protocol with the Soviet Union that thrusts Afghanistan further into the Soviet economic orbit. Most Afghan exports go to the USSR, allowing a credit of 10 million rubles to Afghanistan for essential imports.

== March 1982 ==
Karmal repeats that Afghanistan is ready to discuss proposals for a "flexible peace policy" with its neighbours but is thwarted by the hostile reaction of the U.S. and its allies. He also stresses his government's agreement with the USSR. on all policy matters.

== March 21, 1982 ==
The U.S., the UK, and other Western countries again condemn the Soviet intervention in Afghanistan on the start of the Afghan new year, which is proclaimed "Afghanistan Day" by Western nations. On the same day the USSR. declares its intention of staying in Afghanistan until the Kabul government is secure. The Soviet media criticizes the proclamation of Afghanistan Day as part of a "slanderous campaign" against the Soviet presence in Afghanistan.

== June 1982 ==
Afghan Foreign Minister Shah Mohammad Dost and his Pakistani counterpart, Sahabzada Yaqub Khan, meet in Geneva, while Iran backed out. Cordovez says that at the meeting he broadly outlined the principles of an agreement in separate talks with Khan and Dost and that he also kept Iran informed of progress. Both sides, Cordovez maintains, accepted the main agenda items: withdrawal of troops, resettlement of an estimated three million Afghan refugees, and international guarantees on noninterference in the internal affairs of Afghanistan. Khan comments that talks are "still at a preliminary stage" and reiterates Pakistan's refusal to hold direct talks with Kabul until Pakistan recognizes the Kabul government.

== September 1982 ==
General Abdul Qadir is appointed minister of defense in place of General Mohammad Rafi.

== Early November 1982 ==
An explosion in a mountain tunnel north of Kabul is reported to have killed hundreds of Soviet soldiers and Afghan civilians. According to accounts that reach the West, the lead truck of a Soviet military convoy collided with an oncoming fuel truck. The resulting blast and burning gasoline ignited other vehicles, and most of the deaths are believed to have been caused by asphyxiation from the smoke and fumes that filled the tunnel.

== December 31, 1982 ==
The Soviet news agency TASS declares that Soviet troops will remain in Afghanistan until long-standing Soviet conditions for their withdrawal (including an assurance of noninterference by Pakistan, Iran, and other nations in the internal affairs of Afghanistan) are met. Predictions of a change in Soviet policy toward Afghanistan had gained credence in some Western capitals after the death of Soviet President Leonid Brezhnev in November 1982 and the appointment of Yuriy Andropov as his successor. Western analysts claimed that Andropov, in his previous post as head of the Soviet State Security Committee (KGB), had consistently opposed Soviet military intervention in Afghanistan.
