= 1988 in Afghanistan =

- Decades: 1960s; 1970s; 1980s; 1990s; 2000s
- See also: Other events of 1988; List of years in Afghanistan

The following lists events that happened during 1988 in Afghanistan.

As the Soviets begin to leave, the division between Afghan Marxists and Muslims becomes even sharper, and the fear of even bloodier fighting heightens. Leaders of the Pakistan-based Muslim insurgent groups vow to continue fighting until they topple the Marxist regime and proclaim Afghanistan an Islamic republic. Efforts by the government either to form a coalition or to bring King Mohammad Zahir Shah back from his exile in Italy failed.

== Incumbents ==
- President: Mohammad Najibullah
- Chairman of the Council of Ministers: Sultan Ali Keshtmand (until 26 May), Mohammad Hasan Sharq (starting 26 May)
- Vice Presidents: Abdul Rahim Hatif, Mohammed Rafie, Abdul Hamid Mohtat and Abdul Wahed Sorabi (starting May)

== April 1988 ==
Elections are held for a two-chamber National Assembly to replace the Revolutionary Council. Although the elections are boycotted by the Mujahideen, the government leaves vacant 50 of the 234 seats in the House of Representatives and a small number of seats in the Senate, in the hope that the guerrillas will abandon their armed struggle and present their own representatives to participate in the new administration. The PDPA itself wins only 46 seats, but is guaranteed support from the National Front, which gains 45, and from the various newly recognized left-wing parties, which win a total of 24 seats.

== 14 April 1988 ==
The United States, the Soviet Union, Pakistan, and Afghanistan sign an agreement in Geneva after years of painstaking efforts by the UN to end one of modern history's most bitter conflicts. Under the accord Afghanistan and Pakistan pledge not to intervene in each other's affairs and to work for the safe, voluntary return of refugees.

== 15 May 1988 ==
The withdrawal of an estimated 115,000 Soviet troops, who had entered Afghanistan in December 1979 to prop up a faltering Communist regime, begins.

== 25 May 1988 ==
For the first time, the Soviet Union admits that it has suffered almost 50,000 casualties, including 13,310 deaths, in the conflict. A top general says that 35,478 soldiers were wounded and 311 missing without a trace. Gen. Aleksey D. Lizichev says that the death and injury toll includes casualties suffered from 27 December 1979 until 1 May 1988. The figure is slightly higher than some Western analysts have estimated.

== 26 May 1988 ==
Mohammad Hassan Sharq, a non-PDPA member and a deputy prime minister since June 1987, replaces Sultan Ali Keshtmand as prime minister. In June a new Council of Ministers is appointed.

== 22 September 1988 ==
A UN report released in Geneva says that the conflict has "produced unparalleled human sufferings and immeasurable social and economic havoc." The report states that the war has reduced Afghanistan "to the status of one of the poorest, least developed countries." It also says that the fighting has caused an estimated one million deaths and that hundreds of thousands of widows, orphans, and disabled people will need sustained care for years to come. The 169-page report cites extensive damage to agriculture, with the wheat-growing area reduced to 70% of its prewar size and one-fifth of the nation's livestock lost. It estimates that 2,000 schools and 130 health centres are damaged and that road transport infrastructure will require intensive repairs. The countryside, it says, is "littered with mines, unexploded bombs, hand grenades, shells and other ordnance [that will] pose a major threat to life and limb for years to come." (see unexploded ordnance)

== Early November 1988 ==
The Soviets halt the withdrawal of their troops and also begin supplying the Afghan Army with powerful weapons. The Soviets say that their action is caused by increased guerrilla activity in Afghanistan, and they accuse Pakistan of supporting the rebels.

== 3 December 1988 ==
The government of Afghanistan reveals that high-level negotiations between the Soviet Union and guerrilla leaders are beginning in Saudi Arabia. This is the first publicly announced top-level meeting between the two antagonists since the conflict began. Though it is not represented at the meeting or at a subsequent conference in Pakistan on December 17, the Afghan government is said to support the negotiations.
