= 1979 in Afghanistan =

- Decades: 1950s; 1960s; 1970s; 1980s; 1990s
- See also: Other events of 1979; List of years in Afghanistan

The following lists events that happened during 1979 in Afghanistan.

== Incumbents ==
- General Secretary of the People's Democratic Party of Afghanistan:
  - until 14 September: Nur Muhammad Taraki
  - 14 September – 27 December: Hafizullah Amin
  - starting 27 December: Babrak Karmal
- Chairman of the Revolutionary Council:
  - until 14 September: Nur Muhammad Taraki
  - 14 September – 27 December: Hafizullah Amin
  - starting 27 December: Babrak Karmal
- Chairman of the Council of Ministers:
  - until 27 March: Nur Muhammad Taraki
  - 27 March – 27 December: Hafizullah Amin
  - starting 27 December: Babrak Karmal

== 10-20 March 1979 ==
A mutiny in the Herat garrison by Afghan army officers is crushed.

== 27 March 1979 ==
In a cabinet reshuffle, Taraki inducts Foreign Minister Amin as prime minister and himself takes over chairmanship of the Supreme Defense Council.

== Early September 1979 ==
A rebel force is routed near Kabul in a major battle, and later an offensive is mounted to destroy guerrillas in districts bordering Pakistan.

Taraki leaves for Havana, Cuba, to represent Afghanistan at the sixth summit conference of nonaligned nations, leaving the government in the hands of Amin. Returning via Moscow, Taraki is advised by Soviet Premier Leonid Brezhnev to get rid of Amin, whose anti-Islamic policy is considered dangerous. Taraki, however, fails in this as Amin is tipped off about the plot and manages to turn the tide of events to his own favour.

== 16 September 1979 ==
Taraki is overthrown in a coup, and Amin becomes president of the Revolutionary Council, which is nominally in charge of running the government, together with the Central Committee of the Khalq party and the Council of Ministers. Contradictory reports suggest that Taraki is killed during the takeover, although his death is only announced on 9 October and stated to be the result of "a severe and prolonged illness." On 17 September Amin announces that his rule marks the beginning of a "better Socialist order."

== 19 September 1979 ==
A general amnesty is declared in an ineffective effort to placate the Muslims. This is followed by an administrative purge and a further attempt at reconciliation with Islam. Radio Kabul accuses Pakistan and Iran of sending armed infiltrators to undermine the government. Pakistan is also charged with arming the Afghan refugees and tribal rebels in the border areas with the help of Saudi Arabia, China, and the U.S. Afghan refugees in Pakistan are at one time estimated to number 140,000.

== 25 December 1979 ==
CCCP-86036, a Ilyushin Il-76M of the Soviet Air Force, crashed 36 km (22.5 miles) from Kabul on approach to Bagram Air Base on a flight from Tashkent-Yuzhny Airport, killing all 48 occupants (10 crew and 38 passengers). The plane hit the top of a mountain at 5000 m at 19:33 during a nighttime descent, with the crew unfamiliar with Bagram and no navigational equipment on the ground. The plane carried paratroopers of the Vitebsk Division, headed for Kabul on the first day of the Soviet invasion. The crash was Afghanistan's deadliest at the time.

== 27 December 1979 ==
Amin is overthrown and killed in a coup backed by Soviet troops. Viktor Karpukhin carries out the taking of the presidential palace, in which two Soviet soldiers are killed. Ex-deputy prime minister Karmal, who has been in exile in Czechoslovakia, is picked as Amin's successor. The Soviets have begun a massive military airlift into Kabul, and at least two motorized divisions have crossed the Soviet-Afghan border. Babrak Karmal, whose Parcham party spearheaded the coup against Daud but later lost power to the faction led by Taraki and Amin, is considered more pro-Soviet than Amin had been. In one of his first speeches, he denounces Amin as an agent of U.S. imperialism. At year's end reports from Kabul indicate that some 40,000 Soviet troops are fanning out through the country in an apparent attempt to crush the Muslim rebels. On 31 December U.S. Pres. Jimmy Carter declares it is imperative that world leaders immediately make it clear to the Soviet Union that its actions will have "severe political consequences."
