= 1978 in Afghanistan =

- Decades: 1950s; 1960s; 1970s; 1980s; 1990s
- See also: Other events of 1978; List of years in Afghanistan

The following lists events that happened during 1978 in Afghanistan.

== Incumbents ==
- General Secretary of the People's Democratic Party of Afghanistan:
  - Nur Muhammad Taraki
- President:
  - until 27 April: Mohammad Daoud Khan
- Chairman of the Revolutionary Council:
  - 27–30 April: Abdul Qadir
  - starting 30 April: Nur Muhammad Taraki
- Chairman of the Council of Ministers:
  - Nur Muhammad Taraki (starting 1 May)

== Deaths ==
- 28 April – Mohammad Daoud Khan

== Events ==
April – A bloody coup devised by Hafizullah Amin, a U.S.-educated Khalq leader who, before his impending arrest, contacted party members in the armed forces. The PDPA overthrows Daoud Khan's government. Daoud Khan and most of his family are killed. Daoud dies in Kabul together with the country's vice-president, leading ministers, and the commander of the armed forces, all of whom reportedly tried to resist the takeover. The fighting continues into the following day. On April 30, a Revolutionary Council headed by Nur Muhammad Taraki assumes control of the government. Amin becomes Foreign Minister. The country is renamed the Democratic Republic of Afghanistan. Although Taraki professes a non-aligned policy, there are signs that he is leaning heavily on the Soviet Union for economic aid and advice.

June – Taraki attempts to purge the ruling PDPA of prominent leaders of the Parcham wing of the party. Some are sent abroad as ambassadors, including Deputy Prime Minister Babrak Karmal, who is appointed ambassador to Czechoslovakia.

July – Taraki's reform program and political repression having antagonized large segments of the population, the first major uprising occurs in Nurestan. Other revolts, largely uncoordinated, spread throughout all of Afghanistan's provinces, and periodic explosions rock Kabul and other major cities.

August – Defense Minister, Gen. Abdul Qadir, one of the coup leaders, is arrested after the discovery of an alleged plot to overthrow the government. Qadir also belonged to the Parcham faction.

December – After two days of talks in Moscow, Taraki and Leonid Brezhnevs ign a treaty called the Soviet–Afghan Friendship treaty, which commits their countries to a 20-year treaty of friendship and cooperation. Among other things, both nations pledge to continue "to develop cooperation in the military field on the basis of appropriate agreements." Article 4 of the treaty justified Soviet intervention in the case of outside armed invasion, and this article was used by Soviets in 1979 to justify their invasion of the country. Taraki says Afghanistan will remain officially non-aligned. However, most political observers believe that Taraki's favourable view of Marxism signifies much more than a mere continuation of Afghanistan's traditional economic ties with its powerful Soviet neighbour to the north.
