= 1980 in Afghanistan =

- Decades: 1960s; 1970s; 1980s; 1990s; 2000s
- See also: Other events of 1980; List of years in Afghanistan

The following lists events that happened during 1980 in Afghanistan.

Karmal faces increasing friction within the Revolutionary Council and other wings of the government. One of the most striking evidences of Khalq-Parcham feuding comes when Karmal removes his deputy prime minister, Assadullah Sarwari, a prominent Khalqi, and three other Khalq followers from the scene by appointing them as ambassadors. Sarwari, who was once considered a potential Soviet choice to replace Karmal, is named envoy to Mongolia after a sojourn in the Soviet Union. There are reports of assassinations of Khalqis by Parchamites and vice versa, and bitter interparty fighting is said to have spread to army units and government agencies in various parts of the country. Karmal reshuffles his cabinet, promoting Sultan Ali Keshtmand, a trusted Parchamite colleague, to replace Sarwari as first deputy prime minister.

== Incumbents ==
- General Secretary of the People's Democratic Party of Afghanistan: Babrak Karmal
- Chairman of the Revolutionary Council: Babrak Karmal
- Chairman of the Council of Ministers: Babrak Karmal

== January 14, 1980 ==
A special session of the UN General Assembly passes a resolution (104-18) calling for the immediate withdrawal of "foreign troops" in Afghanistan. Similar resolutions are passed in subsequent years until November 10, 1987, when the vote in favour reaches a record 123.

== January 29, 1980 ==
An emergency session of the Conference of Islamic States, convening in Islamabad, Pakistan, condemns the "Soviet military aggression against the Afghan people" and demands that all Soviet troops be withdrawn immediately. The foreign ministers also suspend Afghanistan from their organization and ask that their respective governments sever diplomatic relations with it.

== February 1980 ==
Anti-Soviet feeling among the Afghans rises to a high pitch, when a general strike and violent demonstrations are staged against the Soviet presence in Kabul and other major cities. The mass uprising is quelled as Afghan armed forces and Communist militia inflict heavy casualties on the demonstrators. As cases of Soviet soldiers disappearing begin to increase, the Soviet troops assume more and more direct control of the security situation from the Afghan Army. The Soviets unleash a series of offensives against insurgents in the provinces of Paktia, Konarha, Ghazni, Herat, Kandahar, and Badakhshan.

== April 1980 ==
The demonstrations are repeated at the end of April, this time staged by students from Kabul University and other educational institutions. The April demonstrations, which occur during the anniversary celebrations of the Saur (April) Revolution launched by former leader Taraki on April 27, 1978, result in the brutal killings of more than 50 students.

== May 1980 ==
Attempts to bring about a peaceful solution of the Afghan crisis and Soviet withdrawal from the country are made by the Islamic Conference in Islamabad, Pakistan. No headway can be made, however. Pakistan refuses to have any direct talks with the Karmal regime, since this would involve recognition of the Soviet-backed government. Karmal insists that all subversive activities against his country must stop before any international discussion on the crisis could be held.

== June 1980 ==
The Soviet Union announces a token withdrawal of one of its divisions, but this fails to placate the Afghans. Despite intense propaganda by General Secretary Karmal, Afghan state organs, and the Soviet government to the effect that the Soviet presence had a "limited" purpose and the troops would pull out as soon as peace was restored, the Karmal regime is finding itself more and more isolated from the people. Except for a small percentage consisting of ruling PDPA cadres, bureaucrats, and intellectuals, no section of the population accepts the government's thesis: that all the country's ills either are caused by saboteurs and agents from Pakistan and the U.S. or result from the tyrannical measures adopted by the short-lived regime of Karmal's predecessor, Hafizullah Amin. Increasingly, Karmal is finding himself in a dilemma, because the very Soviet troops who are arousing such resistance from his countrymen are the only force preventing the collapse of his government. Meanwhile, several regional groups, collectively known as Mujahideen (from the Persian word meaning "warriors"), have united inside Afghanistan, or across the border in Peshawar, to resist the Soviet invaders and the Soviet-backed Afghan Army.

The Afghan Army's strength is down to 32,000 from an estimated 80,000 at the time of the Soviet intervention, due to large-scale desertions.

== September 1980 ==
Outside estimates place the number of Afghans seeking shelter in Pakistan at over 900,000.

== October 16, 1980 ==
Karmal begins an extended visit to Moscow, where he is welcomed by Soviet Pres. Leonid Brezhnev. Their subsequent discussion and joint signature of a document in the Kremlin is seen as a formal acknowledgment of the Afghan government's puppet status.

== November 1980 ==
It is disclosed that Egypt is sending arms to the Mujahideen.
