= 1987 in Afghanistan =

- Decades: 1960s; 1970s; 1980s; 1990s; 2000s
- See also: Other events of 1987; List of years in Afghanistan

The following lists events that happened during 1987 in Afghanistan.

The war continues, with no agreement on a timetable for withdrawal of the estimated 115,000 Soviet troops. There are conflicting reports on the military successes of both the resistance movements and the Soviet-backed Afghan forces. Western diplomats report fighting in all the major provinces, with heavy casualties on both sides. Widespread violations of human rights continue and attract the notice of the UN Commission on Human Rights. At year's end some of the fiercest fighting of the war is reported from the garrison town of Khost, eastern Afghanistan, where Soviet-backed government forces are attempting to end a guerrilla siege of the town. Morale in the Afghan military is low. Men are drafted only to desert at the earliest opportunity, and the Afghan military has dropped from its 1978 strength of 105,000 to about 20,000-30,000 by 1987. The Soviets attempt new tactics, but the resistance always devises countertactics. For example, the use of the Spetsnaz (special forces) is met by counter-ambushes. The only weapons systems that solidly continue to bedevil the resistance are combat helicopter gunships and jet bombers.

== Incumbents ==
- General Secretary of the People's Democratic Party of Afghanistan: Mohammad Najibullah
- Chairman of the Revolutionary Council: Haji Mohammad Chamkani (until 30 September), Mohammad Najibullah (starting 30 September)
- President of Afghanistan: Mohammad Najibullah (starting 30 November)
- Chairman of the Council of Ministers: Sultan Ali Keshtmand

== March and September 1987 ==
Two rounds of UN-sponsored talks are held in Geneva, with the UN mediator, Cordovez, acting as liaison between the foreign ministers of Pakistan and Afghanistan. Pakistan continues to refuse to have direct negotiations with Afghanistan since it does not recognize the Soviet-backed Afghan government. Pakistan rejects the Soviet-Afghan offer of a 16-month timetable for withdrawal of the Soviet troops, maintaining that it should be reduced to 8 months.

== July 1987 ==
PDPA general secretary Najibullah makes an unexpected visit to Moscow for talks with the Soviet general secretary Mikhail Gorbachev.

== July 1987 ==
A law permitting the formation of other political parties (according to certain provisions) is introduced.

== July 15, 1987 ==
The extension of a unilateral government offer of a cease-fire until January 15, 1988, brings no response, and by August even Kabul, the capital, is threatened as resistance is stepped up.

== August 1987 ==
A round of local elections throughout the country begins. A considerable number of those elected are reported to be non-PDPA members.

== September 30, 1987 ==
Najibullah is elected chairman of the Revolutionary Council (head of state). Chamkani resumes his former post as first vice-chairman.

== October 1987 ==
Najibullah ousts the remaining supporters of former General Secretary Karmal from the Central Committee and the Politburo of the PDPA.

== Late November 1987 ==
At a meeting of the loya jirga (grand national assembly), Najibullah announces that he will present a revised timetable for the withdrawal of Soviet troops, reduced from 16 months to one year, at UN-sponsored talks scheduled for February 1988. The assembly ratifies a new constitution under which the post of President of Afghanistan is created; Najibullah, the sole candidate, is elected to the post on November 30. The constitution also changes the name of the country back to the Republic of Afghanistan and embodies a call for other parties to partake in government alongside the ruling PDPA in an effort to promote national reconciliation.
