= Gul Aqa =

Afghan communist minister

Vice Chairman of the Revolutionary Council of Afghanistan
- In office 1983 – November 1986
- President: Babrak Karmal

Minister of Frontier Areas
- In office 1974–1974

Afghan Ambassador to Bulgaria
- In office 1974–1974

Chief of General Staff

Personal details
- Party: People's Democratic Party of Afghanistan
- Occupation: Military officer, politician

Military service
- Allegiance: Democratic Republic of Afghanistan
- Rank: Major General

Major-General Gul Aqa was an Afghan communist minister from the People's Democratic Party of Afghanistan.

He belonged to the Parcham faction. He was minister of frontier areas in 1974. He was made ambassador to Bulgaria in 1974.

He was the army's political chief until 1982. He was appointed as one of the vice chairmen of the Revolutionary Council under Babrak Karmal from 1983 to November 1986, when he was removed from the position.
