= Polada =

Polada may refer to:

- the Poladha, an Hazara tribe in Afghanistan
- the Polada culture of the Bronze Age, named after the Polada Bog (Lonato del Garda, Italy)
