= 1976 in Afghanistan =

- Decades: 1950s; 1960s; 1970s; 1980s; 1990s
- See also: Other events of 1976; List of years in Afghanistan

The following lists events that happened during 1976 in Afghanistan.

President Daud Khan pursues schemes of economic development and agricultural improvements with substantial aid from China, the U.S.S.R., Iran, and Kuwait, partly in the form of long-term loans and partly in technical aid.

== Incumbents ==
- President: Mohammed Daoud Khan

== Events ==
- Afghanistan and the Soviet Union signed a 5-year trade agreement to improve Soviet–Afghan trade by 50% in 1980.
- Henry Kissinger visits Afghanistan. He was the last US Secretary of State to visit the country until 2002 which is when Colin Powell visited the country.

== March 1976 ==
- Afghanistan launches its 7 year development plan

== April 1976 ==
Floods and earthquakes devastate the provinces of Herat, Helmand, and Kandahar. Pakistan sends a message of sympathy and contributes substantially to relief operations, indicating a marked relaxation of the previously mounting tension between the two countries, largely due to persuasion by Pres. Nikolai Podgorny of the Soviet Union and the Shah of Iran. By mutual consent, both countries refrain from hostile propaganda.

== June 7–11, 1976 ==
Prime Minister Zulfikar Ali Bhutto of Pakistan visits Kabul. There, both countries undertake to follow principles of respect for territorial integrity and noninterference in internal affairs set forth by the 1955 Bandung Conference of Asian and African nations.

== August 20–24, 1976 ==
Daud Khan pays a return visit to Islamabad. He and Bhutto reach tentative agreement on a solution to the Pashtunistan problem.

== End of November 1976 ==
An attempted coup, instigated by discontented retired officers and led by a retired general, Mir Ahmad Shah, is discovered and some 50 persons are arrested.
