= 1974 in Afghanistan =

- Decades: 1950s; 1960s; 1970s; 1980s; 1990s
- See also: Other events of 1974; List of years in Afghanistan

The following lists events that happened during 1974 in Afghanistan.

As of 1974, the World Bank estimated that Afghanistan had a GNP per capita of $70/capita. The Shah of Iran had also tried in 1974 to steer the country away from the influence of the Soviet Union and into Iran's influence. This, however, caused the Soviets to increase their presence in the country even more.

== Incumbents ==
- President: Mohammed Daoud Khan

== Events ==
- March: Afghanistan introduces policies to prevent foreigners from stealing art from the country unless they are granted an export certificate by the Kabul Museum.
- April: The country enacted policies to prevent foreigners looking for drugs, especially opium, from entering. In an interview with the Associated Press, Mohammed Daoud, the country's president, described this policy as trying to counteract the "hippies".
- September 1–16: Afghanistan participated in at the 1974 Asian Games; the country won only one bronze medal, placing it dead last out of all 19 competitor states.
- November 1: Henry Kissinger briefly visits to talk with Daoud for a grand total of four hours, then departs the country for Iran via Kabul Airport.
