= Dahla (Hazara tribe) =

Hazara tribe

The Dahla are a tribe of the Hazara people in Afghanistan.

One study indicated that the Dahla tribe were possibly extinct, and a subset of the Poladha tribe.

== See also ==
- List of Hazara tribes
