= 1977 in Afghanistan =

- Decades: 1950s; 1960s; 1970s; 1980s; 1990s
- See also: Other events of 1977; List of years in Afghanistan

The following lists events that happened during 1977 in Afghanistan.

== Incumbents ==
- President: Mohammed Daoud Khan

== January 30 – February 15, 1977 ==
Daud Khan's position is further strengthened by the proceedings of the Grand National Assembly (loya jirga). This body of notables nominated by the provincial governors last met in 1973 to ratify the abolition of the monarchy and the birth of the republic. Its task in 1977 is to approve a new constitution, the main features of which are the vesting of wide powers in the President as Head of State, henceforward to be elected by the Grand Assembly every six years, and the reaffirmation of Islamic institutions as the core of national life. The Assembly approves the constitution on February 14, having written in several new articles and amended others. It endorses the president's policy of nonalignment in foreign affairs and the cultivation of friendship with other Islamic countries.

== March 2, 1977 ==
Agreement on the resumption of air communications between Afghanistan and Pakistan and India is reached, as relations continue to improve. The idea of a "Pakhtun" state is not abandoned, but support for it is less strident.

== March 18, 1977 ==
Daud Khan appoints a new cabinet composed of sycophants, friends, sons of friends, and even collateral members of the royal family. Daud continues to be responsible for the office of Foreign Minister but relinquishes the Defense portfolio.

== April 12–15, 1977 ==
Daud Khan pays an official visit to the Soviet Union. A trade treaty is signed in Moscow on April 14. Soviet leader Leonid Brezhnev criticizes Daud for allowing Western specialists into the northern provinces of Afghanistan.

== April 1977 ==
Waheed Abdullah, Deputy Foreign Minister, is promoted to Foreign Minister.

== July 1977 ==
The two major leftist organizations, the Khalq ("Masses") and Parcham parties, reunite against Daud Khan after a 10-year separation to form the People's Democratic Party of Afghanistan (PDPA) with Nur Mohammad Taraki as secretary-general. There follows a series of political assassinations, massive anti-government demonstrations, and arrests of major leftist leaders.
