= 1975 in Afghanistan =

- Decades: 1950s; 1960s; 1970s; 1980s; 1990s
- See also: Other events of 1975; List of years in Afghanistan

The following lists events that happened during 1975 in the Republic of Afghanistan.

== Incumbents ==
- President: Mohammed Daoud Khan

== Events ==
Domestically, many of the economic difficulties of the previous year continued in areas remote from the capital, resulting in the gap in living standards between Kabul and the more distant provinces widening. Under the leadership of Mohammed Daoud Khan, considerable external help was secured for the construction of oil refineries, fertilizer factories, and various agricultural projects envisaged in the then current five-year plan, both China and the Soviet Union having contributed interest-free loans and technical aid.

There were no serious challenges to the president's authority, supported by a regular army equipped with Soviet weaponry, although there was occasional discontent expressed during the year with the prevalent economic policy. In foreign affairs, the government stuck closely to the traditional policy of accepting external aid but refusing to become entangled in alliances. The country secured improved terms from the Soviet Union for the sale of Afghanistan's natural gas, while maintaining equally friendly relations with China. Pakistan's actions against insurgents in Baluchistan and the North-West Frontier Province were criticized by the government and press in Kabul. The proscription by Pakistan of the National Awami Party, whose activities in Baluchistan and the North-West Frontier Province were favoured by Afghanistan, further worsened relations between the two countries. Daoud Khan attempted unsuccessfully to mobilize international opinion against Pakistan's action.

=== February ===
The Government of the Republic of Afghanistan condemned the Government of Pakistan for having banned the National Awami Party. As a result, the Pakistani government warned Afghanistan against meddling in Pakistani politics, calling it "grave provocations" and "ironical".

=== April ===
In April 1975, Daoud paid a visit to Iran, and returned with a credit extension of $2 billion. The majority of the sum—$1.7 billion—was expected to be used to fund the construction of a rail system connecting Herat, Kandahar and Kabul to the Iranian rail system, which could provide access to the Persian Gulf. The project was not realized due to oil price collapse and the subsequent ousting of the Iranian Shah.

The Afghanistan national under-20 football team participated in the 1975 AFC Youth Championship in Kuwait. They finished last overall in their group; they beat the Chinese team but lost to the Japanese, Singaporean, and Kuwaiti teams.

=== June ===
On 21 June 1975, Ahmad Shah Massoud led an uprising near the village of Bazarak.

=== July ===
A violent incident happened in the Panjshir area in July 1975, supposedly killing more than 600 people. Local leaders in Pakistan, egged on by the Government of Pakistan, condemned the incident.
