= Fazal Haq Khaliqyar =

Afghan politician (1934–2004)

Chairman of the Council of Ministers Head of Government
- In office 8 May 1990 – 15 April 1992
- President: Mohammad Najibullah
- Preceded by: Sultan Ali Keshtmand
- Succeeded by: Abdul Sabur Farid Kuhestani

Personal details
- Born: 1934 Herat, Kingdom of Afghanistan
- Died: 16 July 2004 (age 69–70) Amsterdam, Netherlands
- Party: Independent

Fazal Haq Khaliqyar (Dari: فضل‌حق خالقیار; 1934 – 16 July 2004) was an Afghan politician who served as the Chairman of the Council of Ministers of Afghanistan from May 1990 to April 1992.

He performed duties as deputy Minister of Finance during Mohammad Daud Khan's rule. He was appointed as Council of Ministers chairman during the period of President Mohammad Najibullah government. For the first time since 1978, a free parliamentary debate was held in order to select the Council of Ministers chairman. On May 21, 1990, Khaliqyar, who was non-party figure, was selected to this position. He replaced PDPA hard-liner Keshtmand. However, Khaliqyar's cabinet kept PDPA stalwarts in all the key security posts.

By the end of May 1990, A loya jirga was convened in Kabul, which ratified constitutional amendments providing for multiple political parties, ending the PDPA's and the National Front's monopoly over executive power. On December 11, 1990, President Najibullah inaugurated a National Commission for Clearing Mines and Unexploded Ordnance from the Lands of the Republic of Afghanistan under the chairmanship of Khaliqyar.

A Moscow-brokered plan called for Najibullah to step aside in favour of Khaliqyar, who would serve as a transitional administrative leader until a new government could be elected. In October, Mujaddidi praised Khaliqyar's government and said that he would consult his more radical colleagues on sharing power with him in a transitional government.

Later he backed off from this pledge due to pressure from hard-liners. The Mujaheddin said his association with Najibullah made him unacceptable for any compromise. His government ended with the fall of Najibullah in April 1992, led by the transition of power towards the Mujaheddin. On July 16, 2004, Khaliqyar died in Netherlands at the age of 70.

== Cabinet ==
Office	Incumbent	Took office	Left office
Chairman of the Council of Ministers	Fazal Haq Khaliqyar	21 May 1990	15 April 1992
Deputy Chairman of the Council of Ministers	Abdul Wahid Sorabi	21 May 1990	
Deputy Chairman of the Council of Ministers	Nematullah Pazhwak	21 May 1990	
Deputy Chairman of the Council of Ministers	Abdul Qayyum Nurzai	21 May 1990	
Deputy Chairman of the Council of Ministers	Sarwar Mangal	21 May 1990	
Deputy Chairman of the Council of Ministers	Mahbubullah Kushani	21 May 1990	
Adviser	Nur Ahmad Barits	21 May 1990	
Adviser	Faqir Muhammad Yaqubi	21 May 1990	
Adviser	Shah Wali	21 May 1990	
Adviser	Sayyid Akram Peigir	21 May 1990	
Minister of Foreign Affairs	Abdul Wakil		
Minister of Defence	Muhammad Aslam Watanjar	21 May 1990	
Minister of Interior	Raz Muhammad Paktin	21 May 1990	
Minister of State Security	Gen. Ghulam Faruq Yaqubi	21 May 1990	
Minister of Finance	Muhammad Hakim	21 May 1990	
Minister of Justice	Ghulam Muhyiuddin	21 May 1990	
Minister of Communications	Sayyid Nasim Alawi	21 May 1990	
Minister of Commerce	Zakim Shah	21 May 1990	
Minister of Planning	Abdul Wahid Sorabi	21 May 1990	7 February 1991
Minister of Planning	Ghulam Mayiuddin Shahbaz	7 February 1991	
Minister of Reconstruction, Rural Development	Hayatullah Azizi	21 May 1990	
Minister of Agriculture, Land Reform	Muhammad Ghufran	21 May 1990	
Minister of Health	Mehr Muhammad Ejazi	21 May 1990	
Minister of Education	Mas'uma Esmati Wardak	21 May 1990	
Minister of Higher and Vocational Education	Anwar Shams	21 May 1990	
Minister of Mines, Industries	Abdul Samad Salah	21 May 1990	
Minister of Transport	Khalillulah	21 May 1990	
Minister of Construction	Faqir Muhammad Nikzad	21 May 1990	
Minister of Civil Aviation	Hamidtullah Tarzi	21 May 1990	7 February 1991
Minister of Civil Aviation	Wadir Safi	7 February 1991	
Minister of Light Industry, Foodstuffs	Anwar Dost	21 May 1990	
Minister of Islamic Affairs	Muhammad Siddiq Sailani	21 May 1990	
Minister of Water, Power	Abdul Ghafur Rahim	21 May 1990	
Minister of Information, culture	Ahmad Bashir Ruigar	21 May 1990	
Minister of Border Affairs	Sarjang Zazai	21 May 1990	
Minister of Statistics	Shahbaz	21 May 1990	7 February 1991
Minister of Statistics	Muhammad Nazir Shahadi	7 February 1991	
Minister of Social Affairs	Saleha Faruq Etemadi	21 May 1990	
Minister of Repatriation	Fateh Muhammad Tarin	21 May 1990	
Adamec, Ludwig (2011). Historical Dictionary of Afghanistan. Scarecrow Press. pp. 66–68. ISBN 978-0-8108-7815-0.

Political offices
Preceded by Unknown	Minister of Planning; 1958–1960	Succeeded by Unknown
Preceded by Unknown	Minister of Internal Affairs; 1962–1964	Succeeded by Unknown
Preceded by Unknown	Minister of Communications; 1966–1967	Succeeded by Unknown
Preceded by Unknown	First Deputy Minister of Finance; 1972–1981	Succeeded by Unknown
Preceded by Sultan Ali Keshtmand	Chairman of the Council of Ministers; 8 May 1990 – 15 April 1992	Succeeded by Abdul Kuhestani
