= Mohammed Eshaq Tokhi =

Afghan politician

Major-general Mohammed Ishaq Tokhi is a politician from Afghanistan.

He was a member of People's Democratic Party of Afghanistan. He served as one of the Najibullah's vice presidents in 1992.
