= Sarab, Ghazni =

Sarab سراب
- Country: Afghanistan
- Province: Ghazni
- District: Jaghatu
- Time zone: + 4.30

Sarab or Sar Ab (Dari: سراب) is a residential area in Afghanistan, located in Jaghatu, Ghazni Province.

== See also ==
- Ghazni Province
