= Waheed Karim =

Afghan long-distance runner

Waheed Karim (born c. 1965) is an Afghan former long-distance runner who is recognized by the International Association of Athletics Federations as holding the Afghan national record in the marathon and the 5,000 meters.

On December 2, 1990 at the California International Marathon in Sacramento, California, Waheed covered the marathon distance in 2:28:46 and finished in 22nd place. Three months later on March 2, 1991 in San Diego, California, he ran the 5,000 in 16:04.7.
