= Poladha (Hazara tribe) =

The Dai Folad Poladha (alternatively Dai Folad, Foladi, Polada, Poladi, Foladi); (دای فولادی ) is a tribe of Hazara inhabit mainly in Afghanistan, of the Southern branch of Hazara.

== Origin ==
One study indicated that Maknak, Kalo Zaida, Khurdak Zaida, Kim Sung, Maradina are also subset of Dai Folad / Poladha; especially the Dahla tribe (possibly extinct) was a subset of the Dai Folad/ Poladha.

== See also ==
- List of Hazara tribes
