= Abdul Wahed Sarābi =

Afghan politician

Abdul Wahed Sarābi عبدالواحد سرابی

Personal details
- Born: 1926 Sarāb, Jaghatu district, Ghazni province
- Ethnicity: Hazara

Abdul Wahed Sarābi (Pashto, Dari: عبدالواحد سرابی; born 1926) is a former government minister and was one of the vice presidents of Mohammad Najibullah in Afghanistan.

He was born in 1926 in Sarāb valley, Ghazni province. He worked as a lecturer in Kabul University. He was the minister of planning in the Kingdom of Afghanistan from 1969 to 1973.

During the communist era of Afghanistan, he served in the Revolutionary council. After the elections of 1988, Sarābi was appointed as one of the vice presidents in May 1988. He was also appointed as Deputy Prime Minister in 1990. His term ended when Najibullah was overthrown in April 1992.

Sarābi belongs to Muhammad Khwaja tribe of Hazaras.

Political offices
| Preceded by Sultan Ali Keshtmand | First Vice President of Afghanistan; January 1991 - July 1991 | Succeeded by Abdul Rahim Hatif |
