= Vice President of Afghanistan =

Political position in Afghanistan

Vice President of the Republic of Afghanistan
- Emblem of the Islamic Republic of Afghanistan

- Flag of the Islamic Republic of Afghanistan
- Status: Office abolished
- Member of: Cabinet
- Reports to: President
- Seat: Kabul
- Appointer: Direct election
- Term length: Five years, renewable once
- Formation: 19 February 1978 (original); 7 December 2004 (latest form)
- First holder: Sayyid Abdullah
- Final holder: Amrullah Saleh (First VP); Sarwar Danish (Second VP)
- Abolished: 15 August 2021
- Superseded by: Deputy Leader

The vice president of Afghanistan was the second highest political position attainable in the Islamic Republic of Afghanistan. The vice presidents were elected on the same ticket as the president. A presidential candidate was responsible for nominating two candidates for vice president before the election.

Although Sardar Mohammad Dawood Khan was the founder of the Republic in Afghanistan and the first president of Afghanistan; however, the position of Vice president was, for the first time, created in Afghanistan by King Amanullah Khan when he declared a constitutional monarchy in 1926 and established the position of "Yawar" (later " Deputy") and appointed Mahmoud Khan Shaghasi as the "First Deputy Assistant" (later "Vice president") as the first appointee of this position.

Title	Name	Took office	Left office	Notes
First Deputy Assistan	Mahmoud Khan Shaghasi	June 1926	January 1929	Amanullah Khan declared a constitutional monarchy in 1926 and created the position of "First Deputy Assistant" (later "Vice president"), and appointed Mahmoud Khan Shaghasi to that position.

== Republic of Afghanistan (1973—1978) ==
Title	Name	Took office	Left office	President	Notes
Vice President	Sayyid Abdulillah	19 February 1978	29 April 1978	Mohammed Daoud Khan	Simultaneously served as minister of finance; killed in the Saur Revolution.

== Democratic Republic of Afghanistan ==
The deputy head of state was the vice chairman (or vice president) of the Revolutionary Council between April 1978 and April 1988.

Title	Name	Took office	Left office	Chairman
Vice Chairman of the Revolutionary Council	Babrak Karmal	1 May 1978	June 1978	Nur Muhammad Taraki
Vice Chairman of the Revolutionary Council	Assadullah Sarwari	1978	??	Nur Muhammad Taraki
Vice Chairman of the Revolutionary Council	Hafizullah Amin	March 1979	September 1979	Nur Muhammad Taraki
Vice Chairman of the Revolutionary Council	Sultan Ali Keshtmand	December 1979	1981	Hafizullah Amin
Vice Chairman of the Revolutionary Council	Assadullah Sarwari	December 1979	June 1980	Babrak Karmal
Vice Chairman of the Revolutionary Council	Nur Ahmed Nur	18 June 1981	1983	Babrak Karmal
Vice Chairman of the Revolutionary Council	Abdul Rashid Arian	18 June 1981	1988	Babrak Karmal / Mohammad Najibullah
Vice Chairman of the Revolutionary Council	Abdul Qader	1981	November 1985	Babrak Karmal
Vice Chairman of the Revolutionary Council	Gul Aqa	1983	November 1986	Babrak Karmal
Vice Chairman of the Revolutionary Council	Haji Mohammad Chamkani	January 1986	April 1988	Babrak Karmal / Mohammad Najibullah

== Republic of Afghanistan ==
Vice presidents were appointed after the new constitution and elections took place. Four vice presidents were appointed by president and approved by the National Assembly.

Title	Name	Took office	Left office	President	Notes
Vice President	Abdul Rahim Hatif	May 1988	April 1992	Mohammad Najibullah	First vice president July 1991 – April 1992.
Vice President	Mohammed Rafie	May 1988	April 1992	Mohammad Najibullah	
Vice President	Abdul Hamid Mohtat	May 1988	April 1992	Mohammad Najibullah	
Vice President	Abdul Wahed Sarābi	May 1988	April 1992	Mohammad Najibullah	First vice president January 1991 – July 1991.
Vice President	Sultan Ali Keshtmand	May 1990	April 1991	Mohammad Najibullah	First vice president May 1990 – January 1991.
Vice President	Mohammed Eshaq Tokhi	1992	April 1992	Mohammad Najibullah	

== Islamic State of Afghanistan ==
Vice presidents were appointed by the president.

Title	Name	Took office	Left office	President	Notes
Vice President	Abdulrab Rasul Sayyaf	July 1992	August 1992	Burhanuddin Rabbani	
Vice President	Mawlawi Mir Hamza	August 1992	January 1993	Burhanuddin Rabbani	Died in office.
Vice President	Mohammad Shah Fazli	January 1993	1994	Burhanuddin Rabbani	
Vice President	Mohammad Nabi Mohammadi	January 1993	1996	Burhanuddin Rabbani	

== Afghan Interim Administration ==
During the Afghan Interim Administration and the Afghan Transitional Administration, when the Loya Jirga hadn't appointed a new Constitution yet, there were more than two vice chairmen of the interim administration.

Title	Name	Took office	Left office	Notes
Vice Chairman	Hedayat Amin Arsala	22 December 2001	19 June 2002	Pashtun, representative of the Rome Group
Vice Chairman	Mohammad Qasim Fahim	22 December 2001	19 June 2002	Tajik and Defense Minister of the United Front
Vice Chairman	Sima Samar	22 December 2001	19 June 2002	Hazara, female and representative of the Rome Group
Vice Chairman	Mohammad Mohaqiq	22 December 2001	19 June 2002	Hazara and Commander in the United Front
Vice Chairman	Mohammad Shakir Kargar	22 December 2001	19 June 2002	Uzbek and leader in the United Islamic Front

== Islamic Republic of Afghanistan ==
After 2004, vice presidents were elected on the same ticket as the president.

Title	Name	Took office	Left office	Notes
Vice President	Hedayat Amin Arsala	19 June 2002	7 December 2004	Appointed for interim term, Pashtun mandate
Vice President	Mohammad Qasim Fahim	19 June 2002	7 December 2004	Appointed for interim term, Tajik mandate
Vice President	Nematullah Shahrani	19 June 2002	7 December 2004	Appointed for interim term, Uzbek mandate
Vice President	Karim Khalili	19 June 2002	7 December 2004	Appointed for interim term, Hazara mandate
Vice President	Haji Abdul Qadeer	19 June 2002	6 July 2002	Appointed for interim term, Pashtun mandate, assassinated
First Vice President	Ahmad Zia Massoud	7 December 2004	19 November 2009	Elected in the same ticket with Karzai
Second Vice President	Karim Khalili	7 December 2004	29 September 2014	Elected in the same ticket with Karzai
First Vice President	Mohammad Qasim Fahim	19 November 2009	9 March 2014	Elected in the same ticket with Karzai
First Vice President	Yunus Qanuni	11 March 2014	29 September 2014	Appointed for interim term
First Vice President	Abdul Rashid Dostum	29 September 2014	19 February 2020	Elected in the same ticket with Ghani
Second Vice President	Sarwar Danish	29 September 2014	15 August 2021	Elected in the same ticket with Ghani
First Vice President	Amrullah Saleh	19 February 2020	15 August 2021	Elected in the same ticket with Ghani

== See also ==
- List of current vice presidents
