= Abdul Rahim Hatif =

Afghan politician

- عبدالرحیم هاتف

Acting President of Afghanistan
- In office 16 – 28 April 1992
- Preceded by: Mohammad Najibullah
- Succeeded by: Sibghatullah Mojaddedi (acting)

Personal details
- Born: 20 May 1926 Kandahar, Afghanistan
- Died: 19 August 2013 (aged 87) Alphen aan den Rijn, Netherlands
- Party: Homeland Party

Abdul Rahim Hatif (Pashto: عبدالرحیم هاتف; 20 May 1926 – 19 August 2013) was a politician in Afghanistan. He served as one of the vice presidents during the last years of the Democratic Republic of Afghanistan.

== Early life ==
Hatif was born into a Pashtun family in Kandahar.

== Career ==
Hatif was one of the Vice Presidents of Mohammed Najibullah since the 1988 elections. He served as the first vice president from July 1991 to April 1992.

Before the first fall of Kabul, he was the acting President of Afghanistan for two weeks in April 1992, after the removal of President Najibullah, and before the takeover of power by the Jamiat-e Islami.

== Later life and death ==
Hatif went into exile after he was put out of power in 1992. He moved to the Netherlands, where he died on 19 August 2013.

Political offices
Preceded by Mohammad Hasan Sharq	Deputy Prime Minister of Afghanistan; 1987 – May, 1990	Succeeded by Abdul Qayyum Nurzai
Preceded by Abdul Wahed Sorabi	First Vice President of Afghanistan; July 1991 - April 1992	Succeeded by Abdul Rasul Sayyaf
Preceded by Mohammad Najibullah	President of Afghanistan acting 1992	Succeeded by Sibghatullah Mojaddedi acting
