= Revolutionary Council of the Republic of Afghanistan =

National legislature of Afghanistan (1978–1992)

Revolutionary Council شورای انقلاب د انقلابی شورا
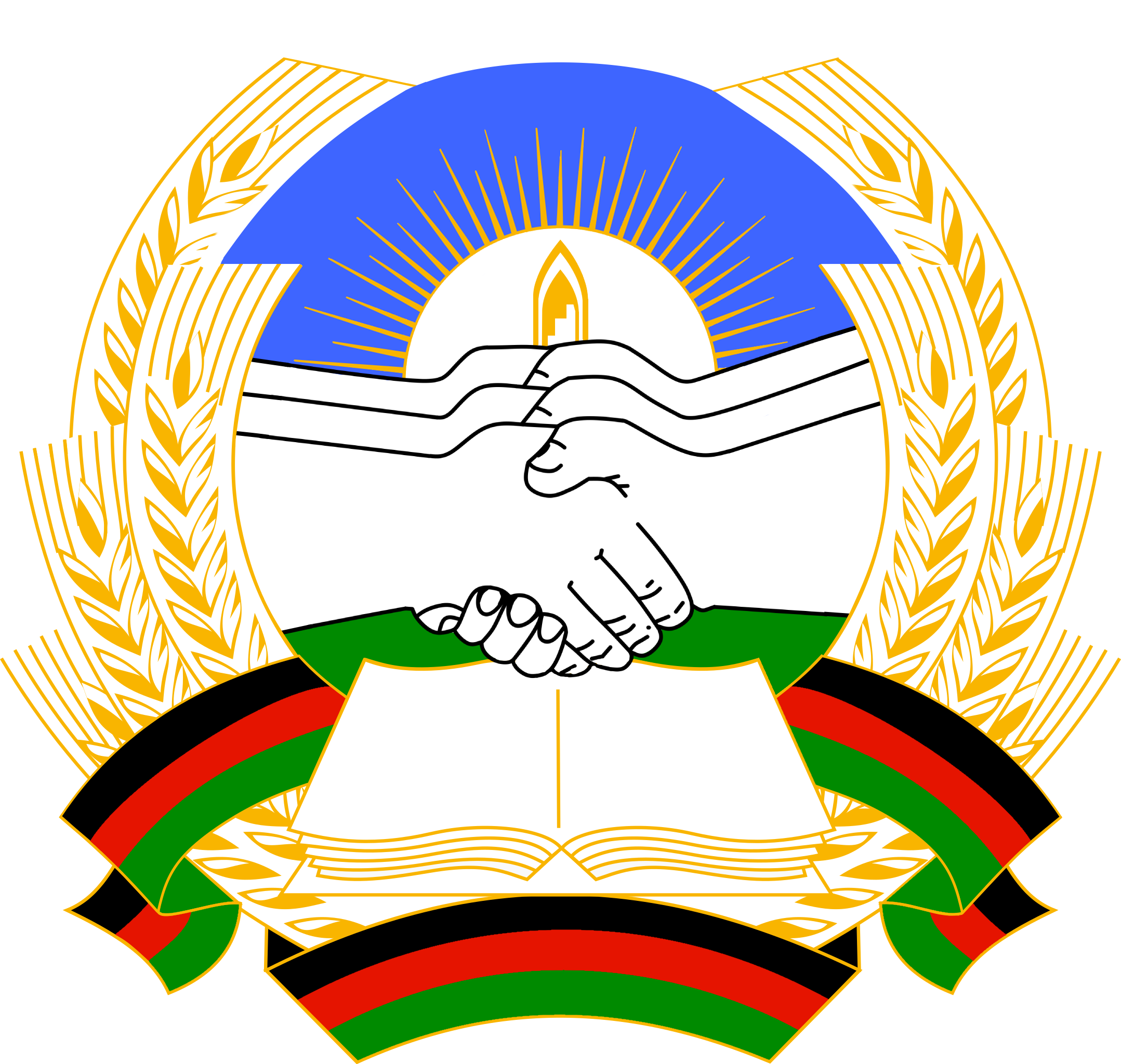

Type
- Type: Unicameral

History
- Disbanded: 1987 (de facto) 1990 (de jure)
- Preceded by: Loya Jirga
- Succeeded by: National Assembly (Afghanistan)

Leadership
- President of the Revolutionary Council: Nur Mohammad Taraki (first) (Note: Chairman of the Revolutionary Council and Chairman of the Council of Ministers of the Republic of Afghanistan (head of government) and general secretary of the People's Democratic Party of Afghanistan); Mohammad Najibullah (last) (Note: Last Chairman of the Revolutionary Council)
- Vice President: Gul Aqa

The Revolutionary Council (Dari: شورای انقلاب) was the national legislature of the Democratic Republic of Afghanistan from its formation after the 1978 Saur Revolution until its collapse in 1992. The council was the supreme state power under the communist regime and was a carbon copy of the Supreme Soviet in the Soviet Union. The council convened on a semiannual basis to approve decisions made by the Presidium.

== Rise to power ==
After the Saur Revolution the biggest problem facing the party was the inner conflict between the two biggest groups in the party, the Khalqs and the Parchams. After taking power, Nur Mohammad Taraki refused to reveal information about the PDPA's organization and how it was built up. Taraki never revealed the identities of the members of the Revolutionary Council during his reign.

When the PDPA seized power with help from the Afghan army, it was the army soldiers to announce their victory over Mohammed Daoud Khan and the first decree ever released by the government was released by the Revolutionary Council of the Armed Forces under the control of Afghan air force Colonel Abdul Qadir. The Revolutionary Council of the Armed Forces eventually merged itself with the Revolutionary Council of the Democratic Republic of Afghanistan. Later on the members of the Revolutionary Council met and elected Taraki as the Chairman of the Council and the Prime Minister of Afghanistan. Taraki eventually revealed that there were in total 35 members in the council, five of them military officers and all of them members of the PDPA. A full list of the members of the Revolutionary Council was never published, and because of that most of their names remain unknown.

On the Revolutionary Council's second meeting on 1 May 1978 they elected the new Ministers of Afghanistan. The meeting showed indicated that the distribution of power was in the Khalqs hands, with 11 Khalqis being elected and 7 Parchamis. Babrak Karmal was elected to the position of Vice Chairman of the council, the second highest position. He was also elected Deputy Prime Minister, which he shared with Hafizullah Amin and Mohammad Aslam Watanjar. While a minority, the Parcham were able to get some important ministries such as the Ministry of the Interior, under the control of Nur Ahmed Nur. The Khalqis had full control of the Afghan security forces; Major Daoud Taroon was elected Chief of Police and Assadullah Sarwari was elected as the new boss of the Afghan secret police, the AGSA.

On 24 May 1978 the Politburo announced the enlargement of the Revolutionary Council. This newly enlarged council met for the first time on 12 June 1978 and this meeting is marked with two controversial changes. The first being to change the flag and replace it with a fully red one. The other being the declaration of the royal family to be traitors and removing their Afghan citizenships. Five days later the Revolutionary Council had a new meeting about the Parcham in the government, while not much information was or has been released about this meeting most of the Parcham politicians of the party were sent abroad as ambassadors.

Under the regime of Karmal, the Parchamis took the most important government positions, while independent politicians also rose to power. The Khalqi faction still outnumbered the Parchamis, especially in Afghan military and other security sectors. Because of the Khalq-Parcham power struggle, discipline within the party broke down. Karmal tried to replace seven Khalqi military officers with Parchamis to get better control of the party; the officers ended up sending the letters back. The government did nothing to intervene or stop these officers, while the government of Karmal eventually executed thirteen Amin supporters. This would indirectly lead to the Khalqi failed military coups in June, July, and October, which all happened in 1980. This eventually led to the purge of the Khalqis from the government, which virtually shut down the government, leaving the country in the hands of the Soviet advisers. During this phase the Parchamis, with the help of the Soviets, were able to crush the coup at the last second. While Karmal was unsuccessful when it came to destroy factionalism within the party, the party became more secure because of the Khalqi purge of the government. In June 1981 the Revolutionary Council with the Central Committee was again expanded, with now including fifteen more members. At this meeting Nur was appointed President of the Council, and Sultan Ali Keshtmand became the new Prime Minister of Afghanistan.

== New constitution ==
In November 1986, Karmal resigned his post as President of the council and left the new post open to former KHAD leader Mohammad Najibullah. Before Najibullah rose to power, Sultan Ali Keshtmand was acting president of Afghanistan and the council. Under Najibullah, the government sought a ceasefire between the Mujahideen and government forces; this process was named "National Reconciliation". After the National Reconciliation talks the Loya jirga ratified the new constitution made by Najibullah and various resistance groups. The new constitution abolished the one-party system in the country and saw the establishment of the Meli Shura (Loya jirga), Sena (Senate) and the Wolasi Jirga (House of Representatives) which would eventually replace the Revolutionary Council. They also agreed to remove "democratic" from the official name of Afghanistan, so from 1987 to 1992 the official name was the Republic of Afghanistan.

== Organization ==
The Presidium of the Revolutionary Council consisted of all Revolutionary Council office bearers and some others. The main role of the Presidium in PDPA and DRA politics was to serve as a legislature of such, approving state decisions before the Revolutionary Council could ratify them. The Presidium office also watched over the Council of Ministers. None to few Presidium members were members of the Council of Ministers, suggesting a deliberate attempt of separating power between the two governmental bodies. Not much is known about the Presidium during Taraki and Amin's rule from 1978 to 1979. Right after the Soviet invasion it consisted of seven members, in which four of them were Parchams and three of them Khalqs.

The Presidium was the permanent ruling body of the Revolutionary Council. Members of the Presidium were elected by the Revolutionary Council. The President of the Revolutionary Council was the Chairman of the Presidium. The responsibilities of the Presidium were to enforce laws, granting amnesty or punishment among others.

== Presidium in 1984 ==
President
Babrak Karmal
Vice President
Maj.-Gen. Gul Aqa
Secretary
Mohammad Anwar Farzan
Members
Noor Ahmad Noor
Abdurrashid Aryan
Anahita Ratebzad
Nejmuddin Kawyani
Maj.-Gen. Naser Mohammad
Dr Saleh Mohammad Zearai
Source: Europa World Yearbook, 1985
