= Sultan Ali Keshtmand =

Afghan politician (1935–2026)

- سلطان‌علی کشتمند

Chairman of the Council of Ministers of Afghanistan (Head of Government)
- In office 21 February 1989 – 8 May 1990
- President: Mohammad Najibullah
- Preceded by: Mohammad Hasan Sharq
- Succeeded by: Fazal Haq Khaliqyar
- In office 11 June 1981 – 26 May 1988
- President: Babrak Karmal; Mohammad Najibullah
- Preceded by: Babrak Karmal
- Succeeded by: Mohammad Hasan Sharq

Minister of Planning
- In office 28 December 1979 – April 1982
- Preceded by: Muhammad Siddiq Alemyar
- In office 30 April – 23 August 1978
- Preceded by: Ali Ahmad Khurram
- Succeeded by: Muhammad Siddiq Alemyar

People's Representative for Kabul at the 12th Parliament of Afghanistan
- In office 1964–1968

Personal details
- Born: 22 May 1935 Kabul, Kingdom of Afghanistan
- Died: 12 March 2026 (aged 90) London, England
- Resting place: Putney Vale Cemetery
- Party: PDPA–Parcham (1965–1990); Watan Party (1990–1991)
- Spouse: Karima Keshtmand (m. 1966)
- Children: 4
- Education: Kabul University

Sultan Ali Keshtmand (Dari: سلطان‌علی کشتمند; 22 May 1935 – 13 March 2026), sometimes transliterated as Kishtmand or Kashtmand, was an Afghan politician, belonging to the Parcham faction of the People's Democratic Party of Afghanistan (PDPA). He served twice as the Chairman of the Council of Ministers during the 1980s, from 1981 to 1988 and from 1989 to 1990 in the Democratic Republic of Afghanistan.

== Early life ==
Keshtmand was born in the spring of 1935 in Kabul, in the Kingdom of Afghanistan to a farming peasant family. He was a prominent member of the Hazara ethnic group. His father was from the Daifolad Poladha (Hazara tribe) tribe of the Hazara, with Keshtmand claiming that his ancestral home is Ajristan, which is a part of Malistan district of Ghazni. Due to his farming background, he chose the pseudonym "Keshtmand" (Dari: کشت‌مند), which means "farmer" or "cultivator of land" in Dari, with it subsequently becoming his family name.

He attended Ghazi High School in the 1940s-50s, becoming involved in politics when organizing with his fellow students in political study circles, which would eventually lead to him meeting Babrak Karmal, then a student leader, through his own study circle.

He would go on to study economics at Kabul University, earning a living by writing and translating for newspapers and as a private tutor until he graduated in 1961. Subsequently, he found employment in the Ministry of Mines and Industry in various departments until 1972.

== Early political career ==
Keshtmand was a founding member of the PDPA in 1965, becoming one of seven members in the party's Central Committee. Later that same year, he would run for his home seat in the parliamentary elections, though would not be successful. In September 1967, Keshtmand was removed from the Central Committee, alongside two other members, for their support of Karmal over Hafizullah Amin. This led to all four formally leaving the PDPA, culminating in the official party split in 1967 between Khalq and Parcham factions, with Keshtmand becoming a leading figure of the latter.

Following Soviet diplomatic intervention, the PDPA was reunited in 1977, with Keshtmand being reinstated in his Politburo position. Immediately after the Saur Revolution in which the PDPA came to power, Keshtmand became the Minister of Planning in the new Democratic Republic of Afghanistan. However, old factionalism within the party resurfaced, leading to multiple Parchamis, including Karmal, being exiled as ambassadors, leaving Keshtmand as the de facto leader of the Parcham.

Due to this, alongside seeking Soviet aid in the face of the Khalq's crackdown, Keshtmand was removed from his post in August 1978 for this alleged plot against President Nur Mohammad Taraki, the leader of the Khalq. The Politburo arrested Keshtmand, alongside the Public Works Minister Muhammad Rafi'i, for their alleged role in the supposed anti-Khalq conspiracy. He and many of the other inmates were subjected to severe torture whilst in prison. He was originally sentenced to death under Taraki, but this decision was revoked by Amin and was instead sentenced to 15 years in prison.

In December 1979, the Soviet Union invaded Afghanistan, bringing Babrak Karmal and the Parcham faction to power. Keshtmand was subsequently released from jail, and re-joined the party's Politburo. He was, briefly, given a position in the Ministry of Radio and Television, before Karmal made him First Deputy Chairman of the Council of Ministers, replacing Assadullah Sarwari, a Khalqi and a member of the Gang of Four.

== Chair of the Council of Ministers (1981–1990) ==
In June 1981, Karmal resigned as Chairman of the Council of Ministers, whilst retaining all other offices as President, and was succeeded by Keshtmand, making him the most significant figure within the government.

As Premier of Afghanistan, Keshtmand met with other foreign leaders, including Indira Gandhi of India in March 1983 and Prince Souphanouvong of Laos.

The rise in the government deficit was of great concern, and the tax collections were inadequate because of the level of increased state spending, as Keshtmand noted in April 1983. The war in the country, however, prevented the government from improving the tax collection system.

In late April 1986, Keshtmand paid a three-day state visit to the Soviet Union, as part of the celebration of the 65th anniversary of the 1921 Soviet-Afghan Treaty of Friendship and Vladimir Lenin's 116th birthday, being received by Soviet Premier Nikolai Ryzhkov. During the visit, Soviet leader Mikhail Gorbachev informed Keshtmand of his plan to withdraw Soviet forces from Afghanistan and the need for the PDPA to prepare for this eventuality. The two nations would sign a five-year economic and technical agreement, alongside reaffirming their alliance and aligning diplomatic views in a joint communique, condemning the American bombing of Libya as a "bandit attack" and advocating for the self-determination of the Palestinian people.

During Karmal's fall from power, Keshtmand remained in his post, continuing on as Premier under Mohammad Najibullah's government.

In September 1987, the PDPA government sponsored a large assembly of Hazaras from various parts of the country and offered them autonomy, as part of the wider attempt to limit the Tehran Eight's influence on the Hazara population during their rebellion. In his speech to the group, Keshtmand, a fellow Hazara, said that the government would set up several new provinces in Hazarajat that would be administered by the local inhabitants, thereby granting them autonomy, however the dire situation in the country due to the war prevented this, alongside other plans for federalism in Afghanistan. Additionally, the 'Centre for the Coordination of the Hazara Nationality' was created in 1989 to allow educated Hazaras to work in government and administrative roles.

A radio station belonging to the mujahideen reported internal clashes by Parcham members in Kabul, caused because of a split between supporters of Najibullah and Keshtmand. Mohammad Hassan Sharq, who was a non-partisan independent, was selected by Najibullah to replace Keshtmand as the new Chair of the Council of Ministers in 1988.

Following the Soviet withdrawal from Afghanistan, Najibullah declared a three-day state of emergency and replaced Sharq with Keshtmand once more in February 1989 during his cabinet reshuffle. However, during Najibullah's liberalization attempts of the government to distance itself from its communist past, he once again removed Keshtmand from his position due to his apparent hardline communist views, replacing him with Fazal Haq Khaliqyar in May 1990.

Keshtmand served as Chair of the Council of Ministers from 1981 to 1988 and from 1989 to 1990, and as one of the vice presidents, although in actuality he held no real power from May 1990 until April 1991. After being replaced by Najibullah in July 1991 for the second time, Keshtmand quit the party, accusing Najibullah of being "authoritharian" and not actually believing in political pluarlism. During this same time Najibullah and his ruling Homeland Party were also facing tensions with ethnic Uzbek and ethnic Tajiks in the north of the country, with these tensions ending in an anti-Pashtun coalition toppling his regime in April 1992. Because of these experiences, Keshtmand came to the belief that Pashtuns held too much power in Afghanistan's regimes of the past, whatever it be the monarchy, the Republic, the Khalqists, the Soviet occupational government or Najibullah's Republic.

== Personal life and death ==
Keshtmand had five brothers and three sisters. One of his younger brothers, Asadullah (born 1949), who was a member of the PDPA like his brother, joining in 1967. He studied agriculture in France, becoming an "active member" of the French Communist Party in Toulouse during this time. He would later become a politician alongside his brother within the PDPA government, remaining as a prominent diplomat until the government's fall.

He married his wife, Karima (born September 1946), in 1966, having four children in total. She would become a politician alongside her husband in various important roles in the PDPA government.

Keshtmand and his family fled Afghanistan to Russia in 1992, however he returned to Kabul for a funeral prayer ceremony, where he was victim to an assassination attempt, leaving him with major head injuries that left him blind in one eye. He returned to Russia, and then moved to the United Kingdom with his family, undergoing surgery in both nations, before receiving political asylum from British Prime Minister John Major.

He subsequently became an activist and defender of the rights of Hazaras and other minorities, claiming that the Pashtun majority in Afghanistan had had too much power in all of Afghanistan's regimes, past and present. After the Saur Revolution, which toppled Daoud Khan's first Afghan Republic, he reportedly said, "Brothers, today the five long centuries of Pashtun political domination has come to an end." He would also remain a prominent figure within Afghan politics, reflecting on the PDPA era of Afghanistan in his book 'Political Notes and Historical Events' alongside writing articles on contemporary Afghan politics.

Keshtmand died in Wandsworth, London, on 12 March 2026 at the age of 90. The Australian Greens released a statement following his death, expressing condolences to his family and the wider Hazara community, of which he was a prominent leader.

Political offices
Preceded by Unknown	Ministry of Mines and Industry; 1960–1972	Succeeded by Unknown
Preceded by Ali Ahmad Khurram	Minister of Planning; 1978	Succeeded by Muhammad Siddiq Alemyar
Preceded by Muhammad Siddiq Alemyar	Minister of Planning; 1979-1982	Succeeded by Unknown
Preceded by Unknown	Ministry of Radio and Television; 1980	Succeeded by Unknown
Preceded by Assadullah Sarwari	Deputy Chairman of the Council of Ministers; 1980-1981	Succeeded by Unknown
Preceded by Babrak Karmal	Chairman of the Council of Ministers; 1981–1988	Succeeded by Mohammad Hasan Sharq
Preceded by Mohammad Hasan Sharq	Chairman of the Council of Ministers; 1989–1990	Succeeded by Fazal Haq Khaliqyar
Preceded by Haji Mohammad Chamkani	First Vice President of Afghanistan; May 1990 – January 1991	Succeeded by Abdul Wahed Sorabi
