= Council of Ministers of the Republic of Afghanistan =

The Council of Ministers was the governmental organ in the Democratic Republic of Afghanistan (later the Republic of Afghanistan). The leader of the Council of Ministers chose ministers for the different ministerial posts in the country. Under the leadership of Nur Mohammad Taraki, Hafizullah Amin and Babrak Karmal the council underwent massive changes. Under the rule of Karmal, there were 20 out of 24 ministers that belonged to the Parcham faction and the remaining belonged to the Khalq faction. All Afghan ministers had seats in the council.

== Cabinets ==
Note: This list may be missing some ministerial seats

Ministry	Lists
President	List of presidents of Afghanistan
Vice President	List of vice presidents of Afghanistan
Prime Minister	List of prime ministers of Afghanistan
Deputy Prime Minister	List of deputy prime ministers of Afghanistan
Ministry of Foreign Affairs	List of foreign ministers of Afghanistan
Ministry of Defense	List of defense ministers of Afghanistan
Ministry of Justice	List of ministers of justice and attorney general of Afghanistan
Ministry of State Security	List of leaders of the Afghan secret police
Ministry of Interior	List of interior ministers of Afghanistan
Ministry of Counter Narcotics	List of counter narcotics ministers of Afghanistan
Ministry of Borders and Tribal Affairs	List of borders and tribal affairs ministers of Afghanistan
Ministry of Finance	List of finance ministers of Afghanistan
Ministry of Education	List of education ministers of Afghanistan
Ministry of Communications	List of communication ministers of Afghanistan
Ministry of Information and Culture	List of information and culture ministers of Afghanistan
Ministry of Transportation and Commerce	List of transportation and commerce ministers of Afghanistan
Ministry of Agriculture and Livestock	List of agriculture ministers of Afghanistan
Ministry of Planning	List of planning ministers of Afghanistan
Ministry of Internal Affairs	List of internal affairs ministers of Afghanistan
Ministry of Public Health	List of public health ministers of Afghanistan
Ministry of Mines and Industry	List of mines and industry ministers of Afghanistan
Ministry of Islamic Affairs	List of islamic affairs ministers of Afghanistan
Ministry of Tribes and Nationalities	List of tribes and nationalities ministers of Afghanistan
Ministry of Social Affairs and Tourism	List of social affairs and tourism ministers of Afghanistan
Ministry of Public Works	List of public works ministers of Afghanistan
Ministry of Women's Affairs	List of women's affairs ministers of Afghanistan
Ministry of Water and Energy	List of water and energy ministers of Afghanistan
