= 1929 in Afghanistan =

- Decades: 1900s; 1910s; 1920s; 1930s; 1940s
- See also: Other events of 1929; List of years in Afghanistan

The following lists events that happened during 1929 in Afghanistan. The Afghan Civil War continued from the previous year.

== Incumbents ==
- Monarch –
  - until 14 January – Amanullah Khan
  - 14 January-17 January – Inayatullah Khan
  - 17 January-16 October – Habibullāh Kalakāni
  - starting 16 October – Mohammed Nadir Shah
- Prime Minister –
  - until January - Shir Ahmad
  - January-1 November - Shir Giyan
  - starting 1 November - Mohammad Hashim Khan

== January 7 ==
In order to placate the Shinwaris, Amanullah issues a proclamation cancelling most of his reforms, such as the education of women, and the introduction of conscription and European dress, and also promises to appoint a council, including clergy, nobles, and officials, to assist him in revising the law, and in reviewing the decisions of the popular assembly. But his efforts are now too late to save him. When Bacha-i-Saqao resumes the offensive on January 9 Amanullah is able, with the help of Russian airmen, to ward off his attacks, but the Shinwaris clamour for further concessions, and in fact seem determined upon his dethronement. Feeling himself powerless to resist them, Amanullah, on January 14, abdicates in favour of his elder brother, Inayatullah Khan, who for the previous ten years had lived a private life. Soon after, he succeeds in making his way to Kandahar, where the tribesmen are still loyal to his house, and where he had sent his queen Souriyah some time before. The change of monarchs only hastens the fall of the dynasty. Bacha-i-Saqao continues to press his attack on Kabul and by January 17 succeeds in gaining possession of the city. Inayatullah immediately abdicates, after a reign of three days, and Bacha-i-Saqao declares himself amir, with the name of Habibullah Ghazi. Inayatullah is allowed to retire in safety with the members of his household, being conveyed, with them, by British aeroplanes to Peshawar, and he soon after joins his brother in Kandahar.

== January ==
Britain is loudly accused in the Russian and German press of fomenting civil strife in Afghanistan. The charge, which is not supported by any evidence, is officially denied, and the Indian government takes stringent measures to prevent the border tribes from taking part in the Afghan fighting.

== January 21 ==
Amanullah, in Kandahar, under pressure from the tribesmen, formally rescinds his abdication and again proclaims himself king. At the same time a force favourable to him begins to concentrate at Ghazni, between Kandahar and Kabul. The tribes in the eastern part of the country also show no disposition to acknowledge Habibullah, partly because they look upon him with suspicion as being a Tajik and not a true Pashtun, partly because they prefer to be independent. Thus the new amir's authority extends to only a comparatively small part of the country, comprising chiefly Kabul and the district north of it, where his own tribesmen reside. Himself being illiterate, he has no sympathy with the reforms of Amanullah, and restores the old regime in Kabul.

== End of January ==
Though up to this point foreigners in Kabul have not been molested, nor is there any sign of an anti-foreign movement there, the Indian government, mistrusting the ability of the new ruler to keep order, decides to advise all British subjects to leave the city, and to place aeroplanes at their disposal for doing so. The work of evacuation commences early in February, and goes on throughout the greater part of the month. Besides British subjects - mostly Indians - a large number of Turks and members of other nationalities are brought to Peshawar by the British aeroplanes. The evacuation is completed with the departure of Sir Francis Humphrys, the British minister, and the last members of his staff on February 25. Within two months the British aeroplanes have brought from Kabul to Peshawar some 600 people in seventy-two flights, without casualties and almost without mishaps - a remarkable achievement considering the height of the mountain ranges which had to be crossed and the intense cold. After the departure of Sir Francis Humphrys, the only diplomats left in Kabul are the Russian and Turkish ambassadors, and the Persian and German chargés d'affaires.

== Early February ==
The Shinwari and other tribes of the neighbourhood being no more disposed to accept the rule of Ali Ahmad Khan (who had declared himself amir at Jalalabad when Habibullah entered Kabul) than that of Amanullah, they inflict a severe defeat on him at Jagdalak. At about the same time tribesmen enter and plunder Jalalabad. A powder magazine is blown up in the course of the plundering, killing hundreds of people, and the town is reduced nearly to ruins. The tribes which supported Ali Ahmad now offer their allegiance to the amir of Kabul, but the rest remain independent, and commence to quarrel with one another. Ali Ahmad makes his way to Kandahar, where he is first imprisoned by Amanullah but afterwards released.

== February and March ==
Habibullah is engaged in military operations with the Tagari and Wardak tribes immediately south of Kabul. He succeeds in defeating or pacifying them, and thus clears a way for himself to Ghazni, where the Malik Ghaus-ed-Din, of the Ahmadzai Ghilzais, has proclaimed himself amir. During this time Amanullah has been inactive at Kandahar, though his agents were busy trying to win for him adherents in eastern Afghanistan, without success, as it proves. He shows little confidence in himself and at one time seriously thinks of withdrawing to Herat, and only desists in deference to the protests of the townsmen of Kandahar, who point out that such a step would involve them in heavy loss. A well known Shinwari Mir Akbar (k.b) from Lavargi (Landikotal) was the supporter of Habibullah, while taking oath as the King requested Mir Akbar to come to Kabul & give him the security from other tribes. The offer was accepted, as it was because of Mir Akbar Shinwari that the king gained power.

== March 6 ==
Shah Nadir Khan, a member of the royal family who was living in retirement in the Riviera and who watched the disruption of the country and its gradual relapse into anarchy with deep concern, returns to Afghanistan. He had been minister of war in 1919, and had won for himself a position of unique influence among the tribes. In 1925, not being able to agree with King Amanullah, he had gone as Afghan minister to France, but after holding that post for two years he had resigned and gone to live in the Riviera for the benefit of his health. He now determined to return to his native land, ostensibly to look after the interests of his relatives there, but really to see whether he could do anything to restore peace and unity to the country. He reached Peshawar on February 25 - the same day as Sir Francis Humphrys - and on March 6, in company with one of his brothers, Sardar Shah Wali Khan, crosses the frontier. Habibullah has made preparations for receiving him at Kabul, but instead of proceeding thither he joins another brother of his, Sardar Shah Mahmud Khan, at Khost. Habibullah thereupon orders his house to be looted and imprisons some members of his family in Kabul. Nadir does not attach himself to any of the rival amir's, but seeks to bring about the convocation of a jirga (tribal assembly) which should proclaim an amir of the whole country. At the same time he tries to induce Habibullah to submit his claims to such a jirga. He writes him a letter telling him that he made a mistake in declaring himself king, as he had no qualifications for such a position, and inviting him to call a conference for the purpose of selecting a ruler, adding that, if he refused to cooperate, he (Nadir Khan) would use his influence with the tribesmen against him. Shortly afterwards, Nadir sends another letter to Habibullah couched in most conciliatory terms, and assuring him that if he abdicated in favour of Amanullah, or any other member of the royal family, he would receive a full and honourable pardon. These overtures produce no effect.

== April ==
The Soviet government suspects Persia of a design to annex part of the Herat province, and issues to it a peremptory warning to desist. The fighting in the north leads to some incursions into Soviet territory, which give rise to preventive measures, but no armed intervention.

On 15 April, a Soviet military force disguised as Afghans entered Afghanistan under command of Vitaly Primakov in an attempt to support Amanullah, captured some territory, but was forced to leave Afghanistan in late May.

Amanullah's forces finally move northward and reach Mukur without opposition. Habibullah meanwhile has marched south from Kabul, and on April 19 meets Amanullah's troops south of Ghazni, and with the help of the Ghilzais decisively defeats them. Amanullah for a time makes a stand at Mukur, but owing to the hostility of the tribesmen is forced to retire from there on May 14. He then gives up the struggle as hopeless, and on May 23 leaves Afghanistan in company with his brother Inayatullah. During this period fortune is equally favourable to the cause of Habibullah in other quarters. In the north, on the frontier of Russian Turkestan, Amanullah's standard was raised by Sardar Ali Gholam Nabi Khan, who had formerly been his minister in Moscow. Habibullah's cause is espoused in the same quarter by Said Hussein, who keeps Gholam in check and finally drives him across the Russian frontier at the end of June. On May 4 Sardar Abdor Rahim Khan occupies Herat, in the west of the country, in the name of the amir of Kabul.

== May 9 ==
Nadir Khan, having raised a force in the Khost district, starts an advance on Kabul, but he is met by a Kabuli force at Baraki in the Logar valley, and defeated, chiefly through the treachery of his ally, the amir of Ghazni. At the end of May Habibullah's troops occupy Kandahar without opposition, and capture the amir Ali Ahmad Khan, who is sent to Kabul as a prisoner and executed there in July. After his defeat, Nadir Khan is left utterly without resources; nevertheless he remains Habibullah's most formidable opponent on account of his influence with the tribes and the loyal cooperation of his brothers. Habibullah now tries to conciliate him and proposes a conference. Nadir Khan stipulates that he shall first resign the throne, but to this he does not consent.

== June 16 ==
Nadir Khan succeeds in obtaining the support of an important jirga of tribes convened by the Hazrat Sahib of Shor Bazar, an influential religious leader, at Shishrak, not far from Gardez. Meanwhile, Habibullah has assumed the offensive, and sent a force into the Logar valley to seize Gardez, which Nadir Khan had occupied in March. Its first attempt on the place, on June 13, was frustrated by the tribesmen, but a second attempt, made a few days later (June 25), is successful. Further advance is, however, barred to the amir's troops by the hostility of the tribesmen. During the next couple of months there is an active competition in propaganda between the amir on one side and Nadir Khan and his brothers on the other, for the purpose of gaining over the tribes. Gradually Nadir Khan wins the day. Already in the middle of July he is able to launch a small offensive, which, however, meets with no success. On August 22 his forces make a determined attack on Gardez, and eventually recapture it, but are unable to retain it. The amir just made his peace with the Hazaras, on the west of Kabul, who had long been a thorn in his side, and is thus able to spare more men for the campaign against Nadir Khan, and so to neutralize his success. Early in September the Durrani tribe drives his governor and garrison out of the town of Kandahar. From a military point of view this loss is not of great consequence, but it cuts off Kabul from one of its great sources of food supply, and causes the price of bread to rise there seriously.

== September 15 ==
The forces of Habibullah, under his brother Hamidullah, again show their superiority in the field by inflicting a decisive defeat at Gandamak, near Jalalabad, on Mahmud Hashim Khan, a brother of Nadir Khan, who had collected a lashkar among the tribes of eastern Afghanistan. This success, however, avails the amir but little. The constant fighting of the last four months has exhausted his resources, and his failure to open communications with India has prevented him from replenishing them. Nadir Khan, on the other hand, has strengthened his influence with the tribes, and at the beginning of October his army, under the command of his brother, Shah Wali Khan, is in a position to commence an advance on Kabul through the Logar valley. The amir's troops meet them outside Kabul on October 6 and suffer a decisive defeat, after which his resistance rapidly collapses. Shah Wali Khan is at the gates of Kabul on October 8, and two days later is in possession of the city. The amir holds out a few days longer in the Arg (citadel), but this also is captured by bombardment on October 13.

== October 17 ==
Nadir Khan makes his formal entry into the capital, and calls an assembly of chiefs and notables to thank them for their support. The spokesmen of the tribes beg him to accept the crown. He at first declines on the ground of ill-health, but as the whole assembly continues to insist, he at length consents. Most of the provinces within a short time declare their acceptance of his rule. Habibullah escapes from Kabul into the district of his own tribesmen, the Koh-i-danis, in the north. He is unable, however, to rally a force to his support, and is in a few days captured along with a number of his chief officials and brought to Kabul. On the demand of the Hazaras and other tribes hostile to Habibullah, all 18 are executed on November 2. The new amir's first steps are to form a ministry and enroll troops for a regular army. On October 19 he sends a message to Europe through a newspaper correspondent that he hopes to lead Afghanistan along the path of progress and to make it an independent and civilized state, to reopen the schools, and to build up roads, railways, and industries. He is anxious to create bonds of friendship with all nations, especially with France, which he regards with particular affection. At the end of November he issues a proclamation summing up his policy in ten points which include the maintenance of Islamic law as the basis of administration, the total prohibition of alcoholic liquor, the establishment of a military school and an arsenal for manufacturing modern arms, the continuance of King Amanullah's relations with foreign powers, a progressive educational policy, and the continuance of the old Council of State.
