= Ministry of Justice (Afghanistan) =

Justice ministry of Afghanistan

- (Dari: وزارت عدلیه افغانستان; Pashto: د افغانستان د عدلیې وزارت)
- Ministry flag

Agency overview
- Jurisdiction: Government of Afghanistan
- Headquarters: Pashtunistan Watt, Kabul, Afghanistan; 34.464562°N 69.114437°E
- Ministers responsible: Abdul Hakim Haqqani; Maulvi Abdul Karim
- Website: http://moj.gov.af/en

Current and past governments of Afghanistan have included a Minister of Justice (Dari: وزارت عدلیه افغانستان, Pashto: د افغانستان د عدلیې وزارت) in the Afghan cabinet.

The Ministry of Justice of Afghanistan assumes responsibilities such as drafting and reviewing laws and decrees of the president, raising public awareness of legal topics, managing affairs relating to legal aid, and printing and disseminating legislative documents. In 1967, the Ministry of Justice was combined with the Attorney General's Office. By 1977, the Ministry of Justice took over the functions of the Chief Justice.

Old flag of ministry, existed during the Islamic Republic of Afghanistan.

== List of ministers ==
=== Ministers of Justice During the Amir Amanullah Khan Period (1919-1926) ===
Name	Term	Appointed by	Notes
Mohammad Sarwar Khan “Barakzai”	1882-1919	Amanullah Khan	1st Minister of Justice
Sardar Hayatullah Khan	1919-1926	Amanullah Khan	

=== Ministers of Justice During the Mohammed Nadir Shah Period (1929-1933) ===
Name	Term	Appointed by	Notes
Fazl Omar Mujadidi	1929-1933	Mohammed Nadir Shah	
Fazl Ahmad Mujadidi	1929-1933	Mohammed Nadir Shah	Deputy Minister of Justice

=== Ministers of Justice During the Mohammad Zahir Shah Period (1933-1973) ===
Name	Term	Appointed by	Notes
Fazl Omar Mujadidi	1933-1946	Mohammad Hashim Khan	
Ata Muhammad Hussein	1946-1958	Shah Mahmud Khan	
Sayed Abdullah Khan	1958-1963	Mohammed Daoud Khan	
Sayyid Shamsuddin Majrooh	1963-1965	Mohammad Yusuf	
Abdul Hakim Tabibi	1965-1966	Mohammad Hashim Maiwandwal	
Mohammad Haider Khan	1966-1967	Mohammad Hashim Maiwandwal	
Mohammad Ihsan Tarakai	1967	Mohammad Hashim Maiwandwal	
Mohammad Asghar	1967-1969	Abdullah Yaqta	
Abdul Satar Sirat	1969-1971	Mohammad Nur Ahmad Etemadi	
Mohammad Anwar Arghandiwaal	1971-1973	Mohammad Nur Ahmad Etemadi	

=== Ministers of Justice for Mohammed Daoud Khan's Presidential Palace (1973-1978) ===
Name	Term	Appointed by	Notes
Abdul Majid	1973-1977	Mohammed Daoud Khan	Prime Minister post abolished
Wafiullah Samiee	1977-1978	Mohammed Daoud Khan	Prime Minister post abolished

=== Ministers of Justice From 1978-1992 (Years involving a coup) ===
Name	Term	Appointed by	Notes
Abdul Hakim Sharaiee Jawzjani	1978-1979	Nur Muhammad Taraki	
Abdul Rashid Aryan	1979-1981	Babrak Karmal	
Abdul Wahab Safi	1981-1983	Sultan Ali Keshtmand	
Muhammad Bashir Baghlani	1983-1990	Mohammad Hasan Sharq	
Ghulam Muhyiuddin	1990-1992	Fazal Haq Khaliqyar	

=== Ministers of Justice During the Islamic State of Afghanistan ===
Name	Term	Appointed by	Notes
Jalaluddin Haqqani	1992-1996	Mujahideen	

=== Minister of Justice During the Taliban (1996-2001) ===
Name	Term	Appointed by	Notes
Nooruddin Turabi	1996-2001	Mullah Omar	Abdul Razak, one of the Taliban's Minister of Commerce, testified during his 2005 Administrative Review Board hearing, that Noorudin Turabi was the Taliban's Minister of Justice.^{[2]}

=== Minister of Justice During the Transitional Period (2001-2004) ===
Name	Term	Appointed by	Notes
Abbas Karimi	December 2001 - December 2004	Hamid Karzai	A member of the Uzbek ethnic group.^{[1]}; Appointed during the Afghan Interim Administration and the Afghan Transitional Administration.^{[1]}

=== Ministers of Justice for the Islamic Republic of Afghanistan (2004-2021) ===
Name	Term	Appointed by	Notes
Sarwar Danish	December 2004 - January 2010	Hamid Karzai	Former Governor of Daykundi.; The Afghan Parliament didn't give vote of confidence in 2010 to Danish's renomination.
Habibullah Ghaleb	January 2010 – 20 March 2014	Hamid Karzai	Previously Chairman of the Legal Consultative Board to the President of Afghanistan.
Sayed Yousuf Halim	2014-2015	Hamid Karzai	Acting
Abdul Baseer Anwar	2015–2021	Ashraf Ghani	

=== Ministers of Justice for the Islamic Emirate of Afghanistan (2021-present) ===
Name	Term	Appointed by	Notes
Abdul Hakim Haqqani	7 September 2021	Hibatullah Akhundzada	Declared to be in an acting capacity..

== See also ==
- Justice ministry
- Politics of Afghanistan
