= 1932 in Afghanistan =

- Decades: 1910s; 1920s; 1930s; 1940s; 1950s
- See also: Other events of 1932; List of years in Afghanistan

The following lists events that happened during 1932 in Afghanistan.

Kabul University is established. Initially, only a faculty of medicine exists.

== Incumbents ==
- Monarch – Mohammed Nadir Shah
- Prime Minister – Mohammad Hashim Khan

== February 1932 ==
Towards the end of the month, the new Fundamental Rules of the Afghan government are promulgated in an issue of the Islah of Kabul. These rules declare Afghanistan to be fully independent in both external and internal affairs, with Kabul as its capital. Islam is to be the country's official religion, and Sharia (Islamic law) is to be binding. Afghan subjects are to enjoy liberty of person and freedom in all matters of trade, industry, and agriculture, while slavery and forced labour are prohibited. A Council of State (Majlis-i-Shora-Milli) consisting of 120 elected representatives from the provinces will review proposals for new laws. Additionally, there will be a 40-member Chamber of Notables (Majlis-i-Ayan) selected and appointed by the king. Primary education is made compulsory, and foreign newspapers that do not offend the religion and policy of the state will be free to enter Afghanistan.

== End of September 1932 ==
Sardar Ala Gholam Nabi Khan, son of Abdor Rahman's famous general, Haidar Khan Charkhi, who was himself for many years Afghan minister at Moscow under King Amanullah, and made an abortive attempt to restore that monarch in May 1929, with Russian assistance, returns to Kabul from Berlin, where he had been living since the accession of Nadir Khan. Early in November he is arrested on a charge of fomenting rebellion among the tribes of the southeast among whom his family has great influence, and of intriguing with the Soviet government, with a view to procuring the restoration of King Amanullah. He is brought to trial before the Loya jirga, or Great Assembly, early in November, and, incriminating documents being produced, he is condemned to death and shot. One of his brothers, Gholam Jilani Khan, who recently returned from Moscow, is also arrested, and another, Gholam Zaddiq Khan, who was minister in Berlin, is dismissed from his post. The king's brother, Sardar Shah Mahmud, takes energetic steps to combat disaffection in the south, where one or two pretenders have appeared.
