= 1938 in Afghanistan =

- Decades: 1910s; 1920s; 1930s; 1940s; 1950s
- See also: Other events of 1938; List of years in Afghanistan

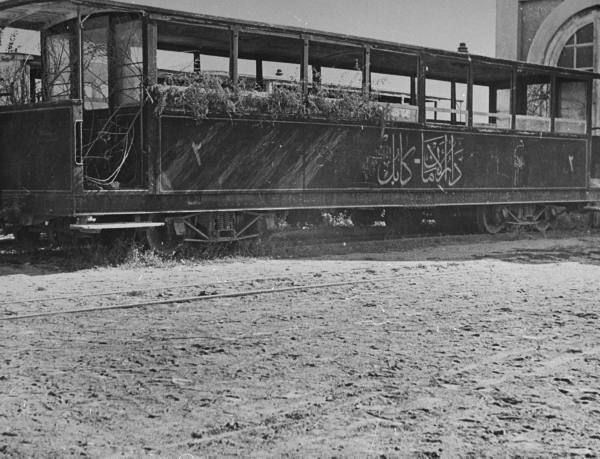
A deserted Afghan railway car

The following lists events that happened during 1938 in Afghanistan.

Afghanistan made rapid strides towards western civilization. Roads were laid out for motor traffic; industries, based originally on military requirements, were developed; and education spread. Three colleges were instituted in Kabul, and schools were set up everywhere.

== Incumbents ==
- Monarch – Mohammed Zahir Shah
- Prime Minister – Mohammad Hashim Khan

== Early 1938 ==
Treaties of friendship are concluded with Liberia and with Brazil, and the treaty with Turkey is extended for ten years. On the other hand, on the proposal of the Soviet government, the Afghan consulates in Russia and the Soviet consulates in Afghanistan are closed.

== June 1938 ==
A number of Wazirs from South and West Waziristan cross the Afghan frontier with the object of looting and of stirring up a rising against the reigning Afghan house. This movement is the result of an agitation carried on for some months in Waziristan by one Syed Mohammad Sadi, commonly known as the Shami Pir (Syrian imam), a imam from Damascus whose family is connected with the ex-king Amanullah. A rebellion breaks out in southeast Afghanistan, headed by the Suleiman khel, and the number of the insurgents soon rises to 2,000. The government, which has been watching the activities of the Shami Pir, is not taken unawares, and quickly sends to the scene of the disturbances two brigades with ten aeroplanes, which are soon after reinforced by two more brigades. The insurgents are defeated in two battles on June 22 and 24, and the revolt soon comes to an end.

Another slightly different version of the events are described as follows:

Pir Shami, the Holy Man from Syria, suddenly appeared in Waziristan in the spring of 1938 and declared King Zahir Shah a usurper and ex-king Amanullah the legitimate ruler of Afghanistan. With the apparent intention of reinstating Amanullah on the throne, he managed to rally the Mahsuds and the Wazirs around him and marched on Mattun, a provincial town in southern Afghanistan. For a moment it seemed that he would overrun that outpost and continue on to Kabul. But the British persuaded him to abandon his plans. He accepted a bribe of £25,000 sterling and left India for Iraq. Some observers have seen the German hand, and some the British hand, in Pir Shami’s scheme. But, in all likelihood, he embarked on this adventure on his own and, surprisingly, the British services in India, to their dismay, found out about him too late. — Abdul Samad Ghaus, The fall of Afghanistan: an insider's account,
