= 1931 in Afghanistan =

- Decades: 1910s; 1920s; 1930s; 1940s; 1950s
- See also: Other events of 1931; List of years in Afghanistan

The following lists events that happened during 1931 in Afghanistan.

King Mohammed Nadir Shah further consolidates his position, and continues to bring the country into a more settled state, as is noted by traders at the end of the year. Relations with foreign powers continue to be friendly, but the immigration of Europeans is not encouraged, and only a small number of European advisers are retained in the country. King Nadir devotes special attention to the reorganization of the army and the control of the national finances.

== Incumbents ==
- Monarch – Mohammed Nadir Shah
- Prime Minister – Mohammad Hashim Khan

== April 1931 ==
After a campaign of several months, the king's brother, Shah Mahmud, succeeds in driving Ibrahim Beg, "the Robin Hood of Bokhara," who has been stirring up disaffection in the northeast, across the Oxus into Soviet territory, where he is apprehended and executed. Shah Mahmud's victory is celebrated at the annual festival of national independence in August.

== May 1931 ==
A consignment of 10,000 rifles and large quantities of ammunition arrives in Afghanistan from France.
