= 1935 in Afghanistan =

- Decades: 1910s; 1920s; 1930s; 1940s; 1950s
- See also: Other events of 1935; List of years in Afghanistan

The following lists events that happened during 1935 in Afghanistan.

The country remains peaceful, although there is trouble among the Mohmands just across the frontier; see Second Mohmand Campaign. King Zahir Shah, with the assistance of his uncle, the prime minister, continues the policy of his father, and strengthens the defenses of the state while introducing reforms very gradually.

== Incumbents ==
- Monarch – Mohammed Zahir Shah
- Prime Minister – Mohammad Hashim Khan

== Summer 1935 ==
Dr. W. Baldow, a German civil servant, is engaged by the Afghan government to survey the entire country, as a preliminary to improving the posts, telegraphs, telephones, and road transport generally.

== October 1935 ==
Celebrations are held in Kabul in honour of the twenty-first birthday of King Zahir Shah, as also of the anniversary of the restoration of the dynasty by Nadir Shah. The king gives a dinner to the diplomatic corps and the prime minister, and entertains leading local residents and foreigners.
