= 1933 in Afghanistan =

- Decades: 1910s; 1920s; 1930s; 1940s; 1950s
- See also: Other events of 1933; List of years in Afghanistan

The following lists events that happened during 1933 in Afghanistan.

== Incumbents ==
- Monarch – Mohammed Nadir Shah was assassinated in 8 November, Mohammed Zahir Shah (starting 8 November)
- Prime Minister – Mohammad Hashim Khan

== February 1933 ==
Towards the end of the month a "Crazy Fakir" appears in the Khost district in the south of Afghanistan, proclaiming that the ex-king Amanullah will soon arrive. At his instigation a number of tribesmen take up arms with the intention of marching on Kabul, and they receive considerable reinforcements from the Wazir and Mahsud tribes across the Indian border. They meet the government troops which were sent south to oppose them in the neighbourhood of Matun, and some sharp fighting takes place at the end of February and beginning of March. The tribesmen from across the border then begin to withdraw at the bidding of some of their elders who were sent by the British authorities to recall them, and the uprising soon comes to an end. Later in the year one of the ringleaders, Tor Malang, is executed with some of his associates, but the "Crazy Fakir", who fled abroad, is allowed to return with the assurance of a free pardon, on account of his advanced age.

== July 1933 ==
Afghanistan becomes a party to the Eight-Power Pact of Nonaggression formulated by the Soviet Union.

== October 6, 1933 ==
The first Afghan minister, Habibullah Tarzi, arrives in Tokyo. It was decided earlier in the year to establish an Afghan legation there on account of the increasing demand in Afghanistan for Japanese textiles, chemicals, and machinery.

== November 8, 1933 ==
King Mohammed Nadir Shah is assassinated at a school prize-giving in the courtyard of the palace. The assassin proves to be a servant of Yusufzai Sardar Ali Gholam Nabi Khan, who was executed for conspiracy and treason exactly a year previously, and his motive was to avenge his master. He is executed along with a number of his associates on December 22. Nadir Shah reigned for just over four years, during which time he laboured chiefly to instil into his subjects a desire for national unity and for peaceful progress in the arts of civilization. The success of his policy is demonstrated by the fact that his assassination has no political repercussions. His son Mohammed Zahir Shah, a youth of 19, is immediately proclaimed king, and receives the allegiance of his three uncles, Mohammad Hashim Khan, the prime minister, Faiz Mohammad Khan, the minister for foreign affairs, and Shah Mahmud Khan, the minister of war, and of the rest of the ministry, the Ulemas, and the tribal leaders. Kabul soon resumes its wonted aspect and the rest of the country remains perfectly quiet. One of the new king's first acts is to accept the surrender of Ghulam Dastgir, the "Kotkai pretender", whose rebellion had given a good deal of trouble earlier in the year and who now transfers his allegiance from Amanullah to Zahir Shah.
