= 1942 in Afghanistan =

- Decades: 1920s; 1930s; 1940s; 1950s; 1960s
- See also: Other events of 1942; List of years in Afghanistan

The following lists events that happened during 1942 in Afghanistan.

== Incumbents ==
- Monarch – Mohammed Zahir Shah
- Prime Minister – Mohammad Hashim Khan

== June 1942 ==
Diplomatic relations with the United States are opened.

== July 1942 ==
The king again reaffirms his country's policy of neutrality "provided Afghanistan is left unmolested."

== November 26, 1942 ==
The 9-year-old crown prince, Mohammad Akbar Khan, dies.
