= 1941 in Afghanistan =

- Decades: 1920s; 1930s; 1940s; 1950s; 1960s
- See also: Other events of 1941; List of years in Afghanistan

The following lists events that happened during 1941 in Afghanistan. Under Zahir Shah the country is advancing steadily in education and in the industries. The ex-emir Amanullah is hanging on to the other side of the frontier and is believed to be under Nazi orders to foment disaffection. German nationals organize themselves as a foreign branch of the Nazi party. The government orders the deportation of all German and Italian nationals. During the year, Sir Francis Verner Wylie succeeds Sir William Fraser-Tytler as British minister at Kabul.

== Incumbents ==
- Monarch – Mohammed Zahir Shah
- Prime Minister – Mohammad Hashim Khan

== August 1941 ==
Iran is invaded and occupied by the Soviet Union and the British Empire, cutting Afghanistan from its trade routes with Germany, Japan and Czechoslovakia. This significantly exacerbates Afghanistan's wartime economic issues, specifically inflation and scarcity.

== October 1941 ==
On 9 October, due to issues related to World War II, Britain requests Afghanistan to expel all unofficial German and Italian officials. The request is echoed by the Soviet ambassador on the 11th. Accordingly, 206 Axis nationals leave Afghanistan over the course of 29-30 October.

== November 1941 ==
The king, Zahir Shah, formally opens the Loya jirga (Grand Council). The foreign minister takes the opportunity to reiterate the government's determination to maintain neutrality and to follow a peaceful policy.

== See also ==
- Other events of 1941
