= 1939 in Afghanistan =

- Decades: 1910s; 1920s; 1930s; 1940s; 1950s
- See also: Other events of 1939; List of years in Afghanistan

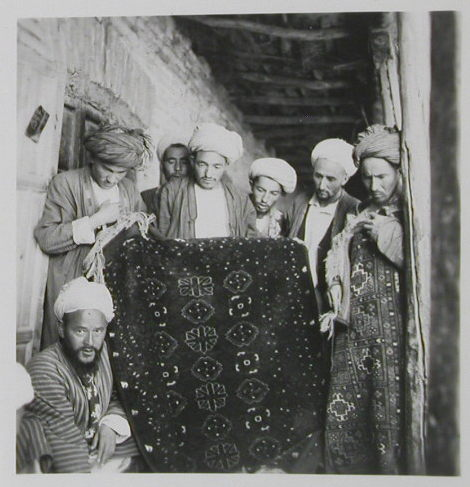
Afghanistan-Turkestan Bazar, 1939-1940

The following lists events that happened during 1939 in Afghanistan.

A year of otherwise peaceful progress is broken by echoes of the trouble in Europe. The government declares its neutrality, but is reported to have ordered a general mobilization and to be exercising special vigilance on the Soviet frontier. In its attitude generally, Afghanistan is keeping touch with the other signatories of the Treaty of Saadabad, (Turkey, Iraq, and Iran).

== Incumbents ==
- Monarch – Mohammed Zahir Shah
- Prime Minister – Mohammad Hashim Khan

== May 1939 ==
It is announced that the government has decided to privatize all government-owned factories.

== September 7, 1939 ==
In the week following the German invasion of Poland, hostilities against the government are opened on the eastern border by a tribal gathering from Tirah, but it is suppressed in little more than a week by joint action on the part of the Afghan and British authorities.

== September 17, 1939 ==
The Soviet Union invades Poland; this act of aggression induces fear of Soviet imperialism within Afghanistan and swings popular opinion decisively in favour of Britain.

== December 1939 ==
The government announces the opening of a twice-weekly bus service between Kabul and Mazari Sharif, in Afghan Turkestan, a distance of 382 miles (615 km), by a road traversing the Hindu Kush which was first planned by King Nadir Shah.
