= 1937 in Afghanistan =

- Decades: 1910s; 1920s; 1930s; 1940s; 1950s
- See also: Other events of 1937; List of years in Afghanistan

The following lists events that happened during 1937 in Afghanistan.

== Incumbents ==
- Monarch – Mohammed Zahir Shah
- Prime Minister – Mohammad Hashim Khan

== Events ==
- 8 July - Treaty of Saadabad is signed between Afghanistan, Iran, Iraq, and Turkey.
- The prime minister, Sardar Mohammad Hashim Khan, the uncle of the king, having gone to Berlin to undergo an operation, takes the opportunity before returning home to visit London, spending a week there as the guest of the government, and confirming Afghanistan's friendly relations with Britain.
