= 1940 in Afghanistan =

- Decades: 1920s; 1930s; 1940s; 1950s; 1960s
- See also: Other events of 1940; List of years in Afghanistan

The following lists events that happened during 1940 in Afghanistan.

Internal economic development is furthered by increasing the availability of land for cultivation, by assistance to the sugar-beet industry, and by official sanction of a scheme for the formation of a joint-stock company to coordinate the work of the country's cotton pressing, spinning, and weaving factories. Special taxation is imposed for the purchase of arms from abroad and the construction of two radio stations and three railway lines.

== Incumbents ==
- Monarch – Mohammed Zahir Shah
- Prime Minister – Mohammad Hashim Khan

== January 1940 ==
Obligatory national service for all males over 17 is decreed.

== Early 1940 ==
Archaeology benefits by the discovery of the long-buried city of Begram, the ancient capital at the time of the Greek domination, by the French research expedition (withdrawn in July) under Prof. Joseph Hackin.

== July 1940 ==
A trade agreement with the U.S.S.R. is signed, under which Afghanistan exchanges wool, casings, skins, and herbs against textiles, salt, sugar, and kerosene.

== August 17, 1940 ==
Parliament is opened at Kabul, and the king says that the country is pursuing a policy consistent with a declaration of neutrality, and that political and economic relations between Afghanistan and the belligerent powers are very cordial. However, he stresses the necessity of being prepared and united in view of current external events.
