= 1936 in Afghanistan =

- Decades: 1910s; 1920s; 1930s; 1940s; 1950s
- See also: Other events of 1936; List of years in Afghanistan

The following lists events that happened during 1936 in Afghanistan.

The chief control of affairs remains in the hands of the three uncles of the young king, Zahir Shah, who continue to work together in complete harmony. The country enjoys peace both internally and externally and makes further material progress. New motor roads are built in the Southern Province, and classes in practical agriculture are opened in Kabul under the guidance of a Japanese expert.

== Incumbents ==
- Monarch – Mohammed Zahir Shah
- Prime Minister – Mohammad Hashim Khan

== January 1936 ==
The minister of foreign affairs visits Turkey.

== Early 1936 ==
Direct telegraphic communication is opened with Iran, the Afghan line being connected with the Iranian at Kalk Ala.

== April 1936 ==
The American minister in Tehran visits Kabul to negotiate a treaty of friendship between the United States and Afghanistan, and about the same time the governor of the North-West Frontier Province visits Kabul to discuss frontier problems.

== June 1936 ==
An agreement, virtually amounting to a trade agreement between the Soviet Union and Afghanistan, is concluded between the Afghanistan National Bank and the Soviet Trade Agency, by which arrangements are made for the barter of commodities between the two countries, with imports and exports balancing at a value of 10,500,000 gold dollars over a three-year period beginning on June 1. Afghanistan is to export cotton, wool, opium, and other commodities, and import kerosene, cotton seeds, linen goods, petrol, and sugar.

== July 1936 ==
The minister of war visits London.

== November 1936 ==
The prime minister visits Paris and Berlin.

== End of 1936 ==
It is reported that the Afghan government has granted to the Inland Exploration Company of New York a 75-year concession for oil covering 270,000 square miles (700,000 km^{2}).
