= 1934 in Afghanistan =

- Decades: 1910s; 1920s; 1930s; 1940s; 1950s
- See also: Other events of 1934; List of years in Afghanistan

The following lists events that happened during 1934 in Afghanistan.

Steps are taken by the semi-official trading company, the Shirkatiashami, to organize the trade in petrol, sugar, and cement. On August 8 a trade exhibition is opened by the king at Kabul.

== Incumbents ==
- Monarch – Mohammed Zahir Shah
- Prime Minister – Mohammad Hashim Khan

== Early 1934 ==
The religious leaders publish a statement thanking the Afghan nation for having shown wisdom in discharging its duty to the late king by recognizing his son as king. Ghilzais wintering in India also send declarations of their allegiance to the new king to Kabul by leading representatives. A pretender who claims that he is a relative of the ex-king Amanullah appears soon after among the Madda Khel tribe just over the Indian frontier southeast of the Khost, but the Indian government prevents the tribesmen from giving him any support.

== April 1934 ==
The Afghan Red Crescent Society is founded.

== September 1934 ==
Afghanistan makes application through its minister in London, Ali Mohammad Khan, to be admitted to the League of Nations. The application is duly granted on September 26. In presenting the report of the subcommittee appointed to deal with it, Tevfik Rüstü Bey says that Afghanistan "was making resolute efforts towards international cooperation, and would give valuable aid to the League's work for peace." Sir Denys Bray says on behalf of India that India will be glad to welcome Afghanistan, which has already shown its will to work for the League's ends during the Disarmament Conference; while Maksim Litvinov, on behalf of Russia, says that it is good to know that all the U.S.S.R.'s neighbours are to be united within the League. British delegate Archibald Skelton says that the Afghan entry is in conformity with a long-felt desire of the United Kingdom, and the representatives of Iraq, China, France, and Italy also add their congratulations.

== October 25, 1934 ==
The government of the United States extends recognition to the present government of Afghanistan, under date of August 21, 1934.
