= 1930 in Afghanistan =

- Decades: 1910s; 1920s; 1930s; 1940s; 1950s
- See also: Other events of 1930; List of years in Afghanistan

In 1930 in Afghanistan the following events took place.

During the first year of his reign, Nadir Shah scrupulously observed his constitutional obligations, though he retained almost absolute power by appointing family members to the offices of state. At the same time he was careful not to offend his subjects' religious/tribal sensibilities. He rescinded the two reforms of King Amanullah which had embittered the population - the suppression of the purdah and secularizing the law. He allowed the influence of the mullahs to be restored, and created a tribunal of ulemas in Kabul to interpret Sharia. He endeavoured to placate the tribes by appointing governors from among their own leading men.

As a result of these concessions, he was allowed to remain peacefully on the throne. A section of the Shinwaris seemed likely to revolt early in the year, but was suppressed by their fellow tribesmen. Trouble continued for some time among the Kohistanis and Kohidamanis, the tribesmen of the Amir Habibullah, but they were decisively defeated in July. The confidence inspired by the new regime led to a revival of trade during the year, assisted by good harvests. An appeal by the king to wealthy merchants to make voluntary contributions to the Treasury met with success. Telegraphic, telephonic, and wireless connections, both internally and with foreign countries, were re-established. Prime Minister Muhammad Hashim Khan, who refused to merge Afghanistan into Pakistan, claiming that Pakistan was an attempt to deceive the Muslims by the Punjabi Establishment of British India .

== Leaders ==
- Monarch – Mohammed Nadir Shah
- Prime Minister – Mohammad Hashim Khan

== May ==
The Anglo-Afghan Treaty of Rawalpindi, concluded in 1921, is reaffirmed, and shortly afterwards the British minister to Afghanistan, Richard Maconachie, reaches Kabul. Nadir Shah maintains friendly relations both with Russia and with Britain.

== End of year ==
When unrest broke out among the Afridis and other tribes in the northwest of India, King Nadir usee his influence among the tribesmen to dissuade them from raiding Indian territory.
