= Deputy Prime Minister of Afghanistan =

Cabinet position

The deputy prime minister of Afghanistan is a senior political office in the Cabinet of Afghanistan. The deputy prime minister is the vice office to the prime minister of Afghanistan. Throughout history, several persons have held the office concurrently.

== In the Kingdom of Afghanistan ==
- Gen. Abdul Rahim (Kohistani Safi) (b. ca. 1886), First Deputy Prime Minister, 1938-1940
- Muhammad Naim, First Deputy Prime Minister, 1940-1948
- Gen. Abdul Rahim (Kohistani Safi), Second Deputy Prime Minister, 1940-1947
- Gen. Asadullah Siraj (b. 1910), First Deputy Prime Minister, 1948-1949
- Ali Muhammad (b. ca. 1893), First Deputy Prime Minister, 1949-1963
- Mohammed Naim Khan, Second Deputy Prime Minister, 1953-1963
- Abdullah Malikyar (b. 1909), First Deputy Prime Minister, 1963
- Dr. Ali Ahmad Popal (b. 1916), First Deputy Prime Minister, 1963-1965
- Abdul Zahir (b. 1909), Second Deputy Prime Minister, 1964-1965
- Sayyid Shamsuddin Majruh, Deputy Prime Minister 1965-1967
- Dr. Ali Ahmad Popal (b. 1916), First Deputy Prime Minister, 1967-1969
- Abdullah Yaftali (b. 1918), Second Deputy Prime Minister, 1967
- Abdullah Yaftali (b. 1918), First Deputy Prime Minister, 1969-1971
- Dr. Abdul Qayyum (b. 1919), Second Deputy Prime Minister, 1970-1973
- Dr. Abdul Samad Hamed (b. 1929), First Deputy Prime Minister, 1971-1972

== In the Republic of Afghanistan ==
- Mohammad Hasan Sharq, 1973-1975
- Mohammad Hasan Sharq, First Deputy Prime Minister, 1975-1978
- Sayyid Abdullah, Second Deputy Prime Minister, 1975-1978

== In the Democratic Republic of Afghanistan ==
- Babrak Karmal, April 1978 - 1979
- Hafizullah Amin, April 1978 - 1979
- Mohammad Aslam Watanjar, April 1978 - 1979
- Shah Wali, 1979
- Asadullah Sarwari, 1979-1981
- Sultan Ali Keshtmand, 1979-1981
- Abdul Rashid Arian, 1980-1981
- Saleh Mohammad Zeray, 1980-?
- Pohanmal Guldad, ?-1982-1984-?
- Abdul Majid Sarbuland, ?-1982-1984-?
- Sarwar Mangal, ?-1986-?
- Mohammed Rafie, ?-1986-?
- Abdul Majid Sarbuland, ?-1986-?
- Pohanmal Guldad, ?-1986-?
- Abdul Hamid Mohtat, 1988-1990
- Mahmud Baryalai, First Deputy Prime Minister, 1990-?
- Abdul Wahid Sorabi, 1990-?
- Nematullah Pazhwak, 1990-?
- Abdul Qayyum Nurzai, 1990-?
- Sarwar Mangal, 1990-?
- Mahbubullah Kushani, 1990-?

== In the Islamic Emirate of Afghanistan ==
- Hasan Akhund, 1996–2001
- Abdul Ghani Baradar (for economic affairs), Since 2021
- Abdul Salam Hanafi (for administrative affairs), Since 2021
- Abdul Kabir (for political affairs), 2021–2025

== See also ==
- Prime Minister of Afghanistan
- Cabinet of Afghanistan
