= Frederick Herbert Willasey Wilsey =

- Born: 25 June 1898; Simla, India
- Died: 1 January 1971 (aged 72); Henley-on-Thames, England
- Relatives: Major-General Anthony Patrick Willasey Wilsey CB MBE MC (son)
- Military career
- Allegiance: United Kingdom
- Branch: British Army; British India
- Rank: Colonel
- Nickname: Freddie
- Commands: Commandant of the Infantry Training Centre
- Conflicts: World War I World War II
- Awards: Military Cross

Colonel Frederick Herbert Willasey Wilsey MC (25 June 1898 – 1 January 1971) was a Senior Officer in the 8th Gurkha Rifles, Commandant of the Infantry Training Centre and Senior Liaison Officer to the Afghan delegation during the coronation of Queen Elizabeth II in 1953.

Willasey Wilsey developed a good understanding of Afghanistan politics and Pashtun culture, and was a proficient speaker of Urdu and Hindi with an additional working knowledge of Dari and Pashto. Together with Thomas Coke, 5th Earl of Leicester, Willasey Wilsey accompanied Field Marshal Sardar Shah Wali Khan and Mohammed Daoud Khan, the 5th Prime Minister of Afghanistan, during the coronation of Queen Elizabeth II.

In 1945 he published a history of the 8th Gurkha Rifles.

== Life ==
Frederick Herbert Willasey-Wilsey was born in Simla, India, on 25 June 1898. He was the son of Herbert George Grausmore Willasey Wilsey and Ellen Margaret Willasey Wilsey. He was educated in England at Bedford Modern School and later graduated from the Royal Military College, Sandhurst.

During the First World War, he saw active service in Mesopotamia and Palestine. In 1916, he was on the unattached list to the British Indian Army as a Second Lieutenant. He was attached to the 9th Gurkha Rifles in 1917. The citation for his award of a Military Cross in 1918 read:

Lt. Frederick Herbert Willasey Wilsey, l/9th (attd. l/8th) Gurkha Rif., I.A. (EGYPT) For conspicuous gallantry and devotion to duty. 'When out on a reconnaissance patrol with eighteen men he came upon an enemy picquet on a knoll about 200 yards from our line. Three of the patrol were bombed, but he charged the post, capturing one man and driving the others away. On withdrawing he found two of his men missing, so he again charged the knoll and recovered them, bringing the whole patrol back intact. He gained valuable information, and showed both courage, and resource.

After the First World War, Wilsey remained in the army and was promoted to Major in 1934, Lieutenant Colonel in 1942, and Colonel in 1947. He was made Commandant of the Infantry Training Centre in 1940.

Willasey Wilsey was Senior Liaison Officer to the Afghan delegation during the coronation of Queen Elizabeth II in 1953. He had developed a good understanding of Afghanistan politics and Pashtun culture, and was a proficient speaker of Urdu and Hindi with an additional working knowledge of Dari and Pashto. Together with Thomas Coke, 5th Earl of Leicester, Willasey Wilsey accompanied Field Marshal Sardar Shah Wali Khan and Mohammed Daoud Khan, the 5th President of Afghanistan, during the coronation.

Willasey Wilsey married Eleanor Margerison. He died suddenly at his home in Henley-on-Thames on New Year’s Day, 1971, and was survived by his wife and two sons. His son, Major-General Patrick Willasey Wilsey CB MBE MC, distinguished himself in the Royal Marines, and Major Michael Willasey Wilsey was in the Coldstream Guards. His grandson is Tim Willasey-Wilsey, a visiting professor at King’s College, London.

== Publication ==
A Brief Outline Of The 8th Gurkha Rifles, by F. H. W. Wilsey. Published by The Civil And Military Gazette, Quetta, 1945
