= Mohammad Aziz Khan =

Afghan prince and diplomat

Sardar Mohammed Aziz Khan
- محمد عزیز خان
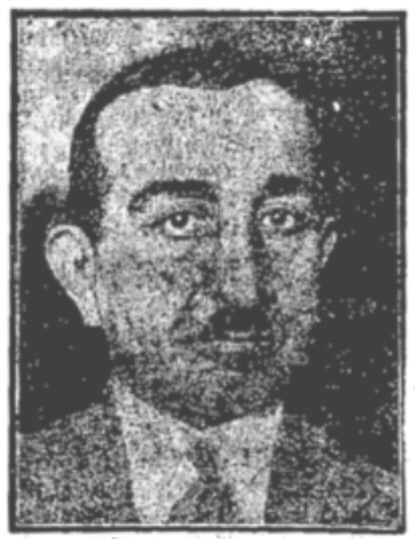

Ambassador of Afghanistan to Germany
- In office 1931 – 6 June 1933
- Monarch: Mohammed Nadir Shah
- Prime Minister: Mohammad Hashim Khan
- Preceded by: Ghulam Siddiq Charkhi
- Succeeded by: Allah Nawaz Khan Ghulam Faruq

Minister of Foreign Affairs of Afghanistan
- In office 1917–1919
- Monarch: Habibullah Khan
- Preceded by: Mirza Ghulam Mohammad Mir Munsi
- Succeeded by: Mahmud Tarzi

Personal details
- Born: 1877 Dehradun, British India
- Died: 6 June 1933 (aged 55–56) Berlin, Nazi Germany
- Cause of death: Assassination
- Party: Independent
- Spouse: Khurshid Begum
- Children: Mohammed Daoud Khan; Mohammed Naim Khan

Sardar Mohammed Aziz Khan (Pashto: محمد عزیز خان) (1877 – June 6, 1933) was an Afghan prince and diplomat who served as Minister of Foreign Affairs of the Emirate of Afghanistan, and as Ambassador of the Kingdom of Afghanistan to Nazi Germany, until his assassination by an Afghan gunman in Berlin. He was a member of the Musahiban Barakzai dynasty, a son of Mohammad Yusuf Khan, elder half-brother of King Mohammed Nadir Shah, and father of President Mohammed Daoud Khan and Minister of Foreign Affairs Mohammed Naim Khan.

Upon the succession of his half-brother to the throne, following the Afghan Civil War, he was appointed to the ambassadorship along with his other brothers, who all received high positions of power in return for their continued support in exile in Europe, and on the return to Afghanistan.

== Assassination ==
While on his assignment to Berlin, Aziz was killed by Sayed Kamal (born on 18 September 1900), an Afghan student of the Technische Hochschule Berlin, on the steps of the Afghan Embassy. The gunman told the Gestapo that he was discontent with the Nadir Shah regime's cooperation with the United Kingdom. Aziz's assassination came a couple of months before his half-brother, the King was also killed by a gunman in Afghanistan.

The gunman was tried and sentenced to death in 1934 for the murder by Germany, and after a failed extradition attempt by the Afghan government, was executed in 1935.

== See also ==
- List of assassinated serving ambassadors
