= Nik Mohammad Khan Mangal =

Afghan military officer

Major General Nik Muhammad Khan Mangal نیک محمد خان منگل MH-FSGC OS-MM
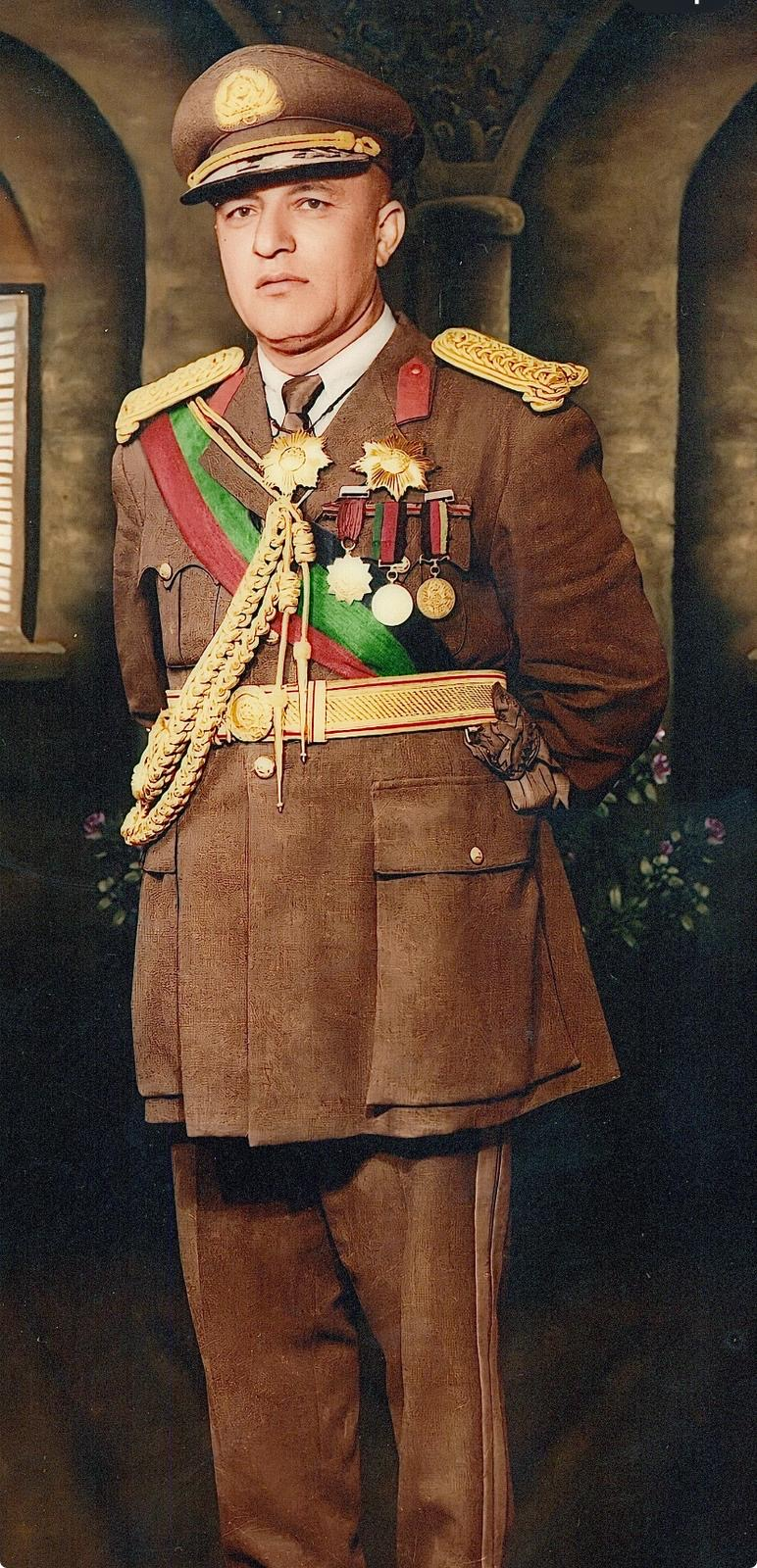
- Official Portrait of Nik Mohammad Khan Mangal

Commander of Military Operations Department
- In office 1966–1973

Personal details
- Born: 1913 Manzi, Musa Khel District, Mangal, Khost Province, Kingdom of Afghanistan
- Died: 1979 (aged 65–66) Kabul, Democratic Republic of Afghanistan
- Known for: Military Leadership, Educational Support
- Awards: Order of the Sun Merit Medals; Medal of Honour for Faithful Service and Good Conduct; Officers' Star of Honour for the Campaign against Bachha-i-Saqqa

Military service
- Allegiance: Kingdom of Afghanistan
- Branch/service: Royal Afghan Army
- Years of service: ? - 1973
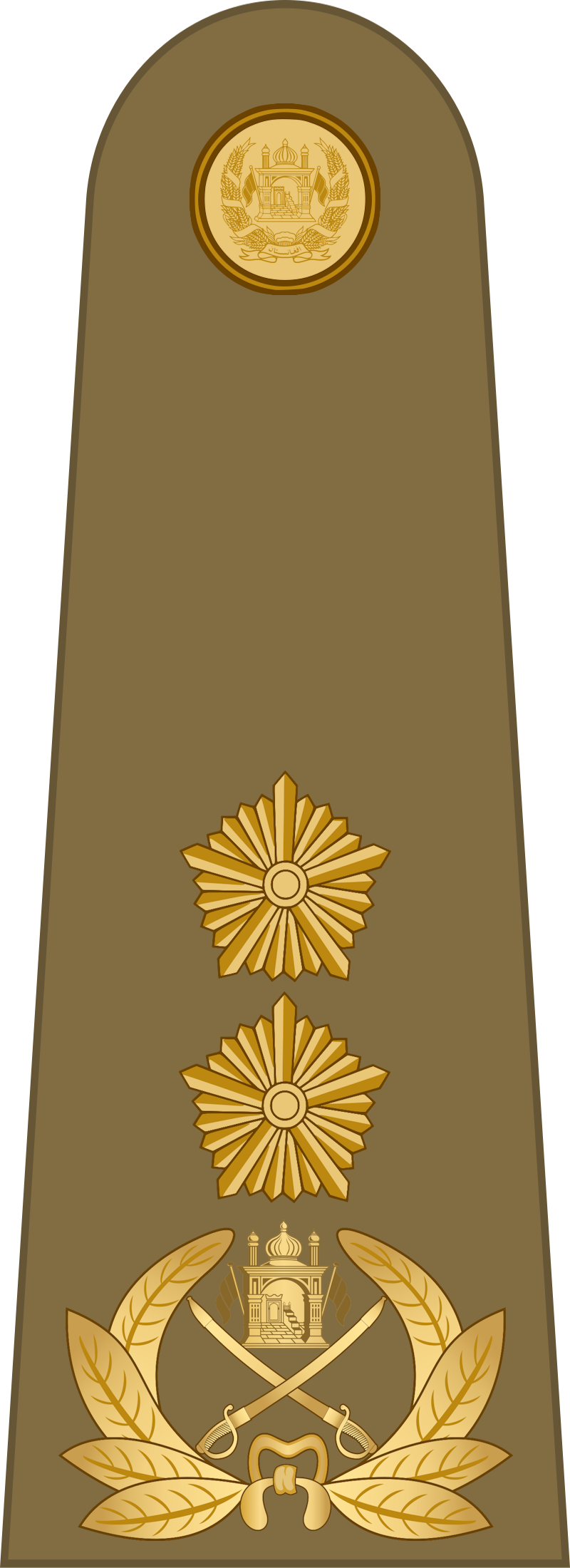
- Rank: Major General
- Battles/wars: 1961 Kunar Incursion

Nik Muhammad Khan Mangal (1913 – 1979) was an Afghan Major General who led the Military Operations Department at the Ministry of National Defense from 1966 to 1973.

== Arrest and disappearance ==
On the night of April 27, 1979, Mangal and his nine sons were taken from their home in Jamal Mina, Karta 4, Kabul, by the police. He had been retired for seven years and had no official role at the time. While Mangal was never seen again after his arrest, his nine sons were released later, after a tribal leader asked the government to release them.

== Military career ==
He completed his military studies up to the Arkan-e-Harb, the highest level. In 1962, he was promoted to Brigadier General and led military units in Qala Jangi and Rishkhoro, Kabul. In 1966, he was promoted to Major General and appointed as Commander of the Military Operations Department at the Ministry of National Defense. He retired in 1973.

== Education and military training ==
Mangal showed a strong passion for education from a young age. A family elder sent him to Kabul to pursue his studies. He eventually enrolled in the military university course known as "Course A" which he successfully completed.
