= Mohammed Asif Safi =

Royal Afghan Army General

Mohammed Asif Safi محمد آصف صافي
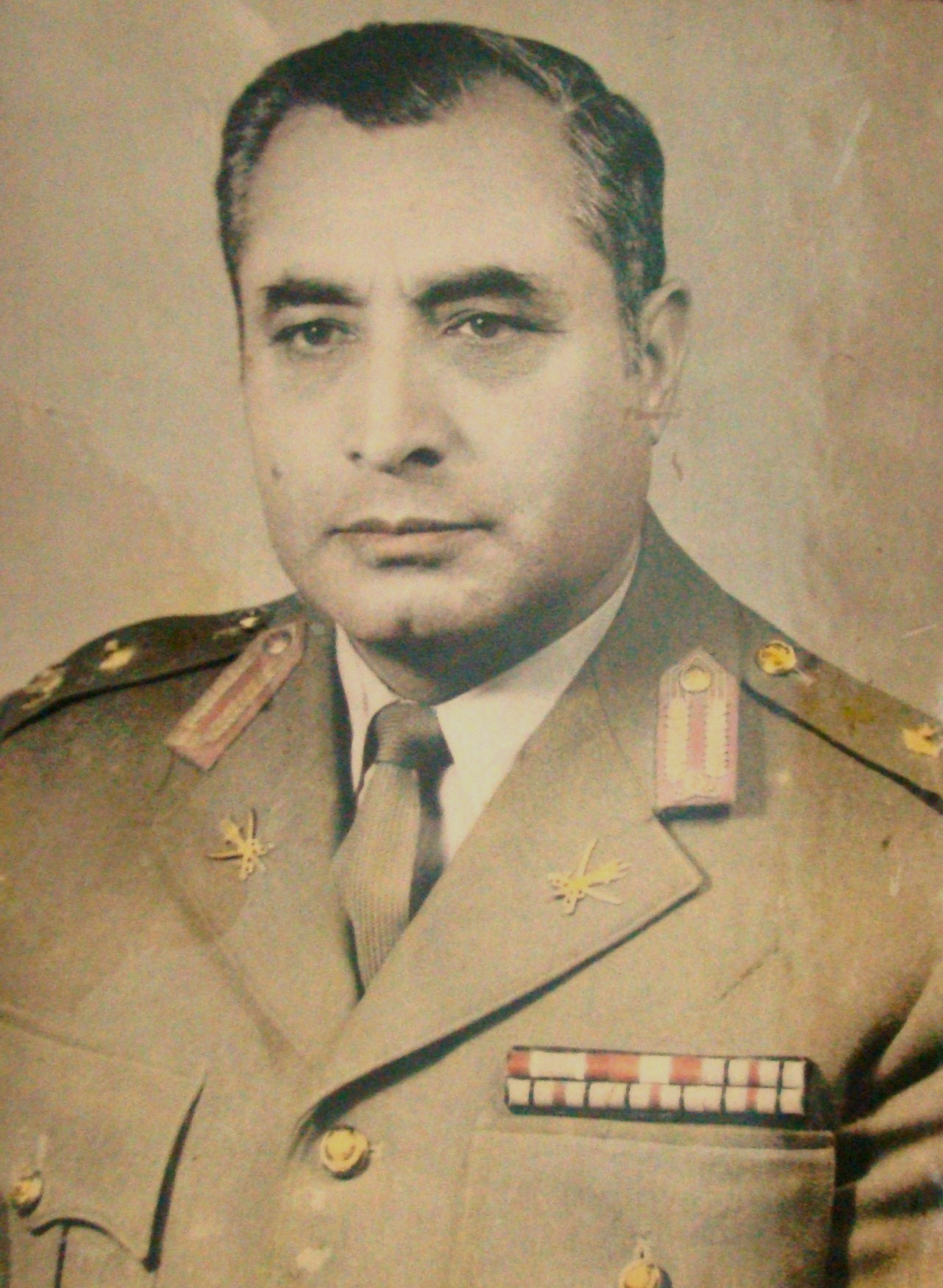

Personal details
- Born: 1923 Alikhel District, Laghman Province, Afghanistan
- Died: July 26, 2009 (aged 85–86)
- Resting place: Sacramento, California
- Occupation: Army General in the Royal Afghan Army
- Known for: Military service
- Awards: Medal of Honour

Military service
- Allegiance: Kingdom of Afghanistan; Republic of Afghanistan
- Branch/service: Royal Afghan Army
- Years of service: 1944-1978
- Rank: General

General Mohammed Asif Safi (1923 — July 26, 2009) (Pashto:تور نجنرال اركانحرب محمد آصف صافي) was an Army General in the Royal Afghan Army during King Zahir's rule in the Kingdom of Afghanistan, and later also served in the Afghan Army during the 1970s regime of President Mohammed Daoud Khan in the Republic of Afghanistan.

== Early life and education ==
General Safi was born in Laghman Province in eastern Afghanistan. His father, Mohammed Ayub Khan (also known as Malik Saylob), was a local Malik of Ali Khel district. At age four, Safi attended Afghanistan's National Army school (Pashto: Arbi Shwanzai). In 1944, he graduated from Afghanistan's National Army University (Pashto: Arbi Pohantoon) with highest honor. In 1945, he went to India for higher education, and attended an army institute in the city of Ambala. In 1955, he went to Turkey where he obtained a master's degree, and went again in 1959 to obtain a doctorate degree. He attended the Turkish War College of Command (Turkish: Harp Akademileri Komutanlığı), the same army institute attended by Mustafa Kemal Atatürk.

== Career ==
Safi did not affiliate with any political movement or party in the Kingdom of Afghanistan. In 1962, Safi was appointed as Commander for Officer's University of Heytyaat. In 1967, he was appoint as Commander and Professor at Officer's Higher University (Dari: Course of Haa, Haa being short for Haali = Higher), which he also founded. During this time hundreds of Army Officers were trained under him, and he established himself a unique position in Afghan Army, considered one of the most educated and influential of the army officers. Based on his qualification and the respect that he earned in Army, Safi was promoted to the first rank of army General (Pashto: بريت جنرال Breet General) in 1970.

In 1973, General Safi was appointed as the Commander of Air Defense at Qala-i-Jangi of Kabul Province. In 1974, he was appointed as the Director of Army's Ministry of Education (Pashto: Taleem-O-Tarbia). In 1975, he was appointed as the Commander of Army's 12th Infantry in Gardēz (Dari: گردیز, Pashto: ګردېز), the capital of Paktiā province of Afghanistan. In 1976, he was appointed as the Commander of Army's 20th Infantry in Nahrin, a town in Baghlan Province of north-eastern Afghanistan. Also during this year he was promoted to the rank of the second rank of army General (Pashto; توران جنرال Tooran General).

The Afghan Army 1978

- Central Corps (Kabul)
  - 7th Division (Kabul)
  - 8th Division (Kabul)
  - 4th and 15th Armoured Brigades
  - Republican Guard Brigade
- 2nd Corps (Kandahar)
  - 7th Armoured Brigade
  - other units (15th Inf Div?)
- 3rd Corps (Gardez)
- 9th Division (Chugha-Serai)
- 11th Division (Jalalabad)
- 12th Division (Gardez)
- 14th Division (Ghazni)
- 15th Division (Kandahar)
- 17th Division (Herat)
- 18th Division (Mazar-i-Sharif)
- 20th Division (Nahrin)
- 25th Division (Khost)

== Establishment of First Army Officer’s Academy ==
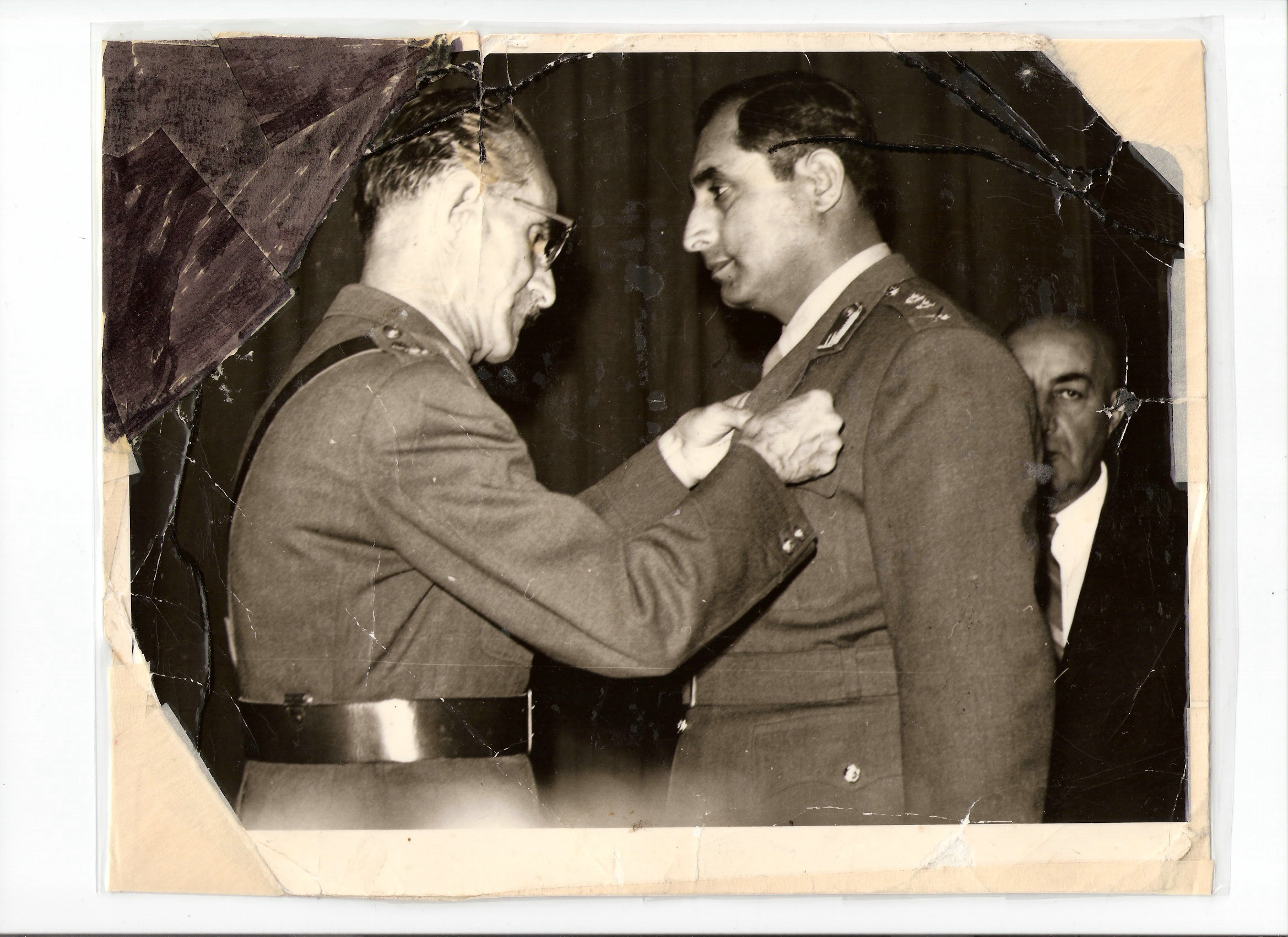
General Safi receiving a medal of honor from Sardar Shah Wali Khan and then Prime Minister Daoud Khan in the background.

One of General Safi's greatest achievement and service to Afghan National Army was the establishment of the first Officer's Academy in the history of Afghanistan known as Course-e-Haa (short for Course e Haali Afsaran meaning Academy of Higher Education for Officers). Before this course, Afghanistan's army only had Harbi Shwanzai (Army School of 1 through 12K), and Harbi Pohantun (Army University which offered 4-year program), which meant that Master Degree program were not offered for army officers. Most army officer, including Safi himself, would travel to India, United States, Turkey, and Russia, to obtain higher army education. Safi was the first army officer to obtain a Doctorate Degree from Turkey, and therefore, had academic credentials to issue a Master Degree for army officers. Given his experience of commanding and teaching at Officer's University of Heytyaat (Army Reserve University), Army University (Harbi Pohantun), and Army High School (Harbi Shwanzai), Safi, in 1967, established the Course-e-Haa (Officer's Academy for Higher Education). The Diploma offered by Course-e-Haa was equivalent to that of a Master Degree. Hence, for the first time in the history of Afghanistan's armed forces, since its modern era establishment by Amir Shir Ali Khan during the 1860s, Afghanistan's army officer could obtain higher education in Afghanistan instead of travelling to other countries. Hundreds of Afghan army officers, including many prominent figures, attended and graduated from Course-e-Haa.

During his time as general, he had received medals from Marshal Sardar Shah Wali Khan Ghazi, King Zahir Shah, and President Daoud Khan. General Safi had traveled numerous times on behalf of Defense Ministry to other countries for weapon purchases and signing defense contracts. He accompanied King Zahir Shah on an official state visit to the Soviet Union in 1967. General Safi was the Security in Charge (Pashto: Yaawar) to many foreign dignitary and heads of state visiting Afghanistan, including Iran's prime minister Amir-Abbas Hoveida’s official visit to Afghanistan.

Safi's biography in honor of his service to Afghanistan has been written in the Defense Ministry. His work as founder and leading instructor of Course-e-Haa, Air Defense, and for translating numerous military books and articles from Turkish to Pashto and Dari was recognized even during the communist regime of Afghanistan.

== Political turmoil of Afghanistan ==
General Safi was forced out of the Army since he did not assist Sardar Mohammed Daoud Khan during his successful coup d'etat in 1973 against King Zahir. Eventually President Daoud Khan met with Safi and acknowledged his service for Afghanistan rather than for the disposed monarchy, and reappointed him.

In 1973, shortly after Daoud Khan's rise to the Presidency, a coup attempt, which may have been planned before Daoud Khan took power, was subdued shortly after the start of his Presidency. The former prime minister, Mohammad Hashim Maiwandwal (Pashto: محمد هاشم میوندوال), was arrested for his alleged part in this plot. Whether Maiwandwal was in on the plot from the start is open to question. This led to the arrest of Maiwandwal and 20 others, including General Safi, who was jailed for a fortnight before being released. President Daoud Khan personally apologised to Safi for the arrest and for forcing him out of the Army. Safi cautioned and advised Daoud Khan during this meeting of the threat of the rising communist movement, and specifically named Babrak Karmal as one of the members of this movement. Maiwandwal was supposedly killed by the Parcham (Pashto: پرچم meaning "Banner" or "Flag") wing of the communist party (who controlled the Interior Ministry) during his custody.

General Safi was in Nahrin when he heard the news of the Saur Revolution in 1978, unable to bring his infantry to Kabul to assist President Daoud Khan. After his return to Kabul, Safi was put under house arrest by the new communist regime for a short period of time, and later on forced to an honorable retirement.

== Post-service life ==
During the communist regime, General Safi was put under house arrest twice during President Nur Muhammad Taraki and then Hafizullah Amin. He was not harmed because he was not associated with any political movement. Following the outbreak of the Soviet-Afghan War, General Safi developed medical depression. He was invited to many government sponsored events but Safi refused to attend, except those related to Afghanistan's military history and culture.

In 1986, when Dr. Mohammad Najibullah became president, some freedom of movement and expression was restored in Afghanistan. However, security was constantly destabilizing during this time.

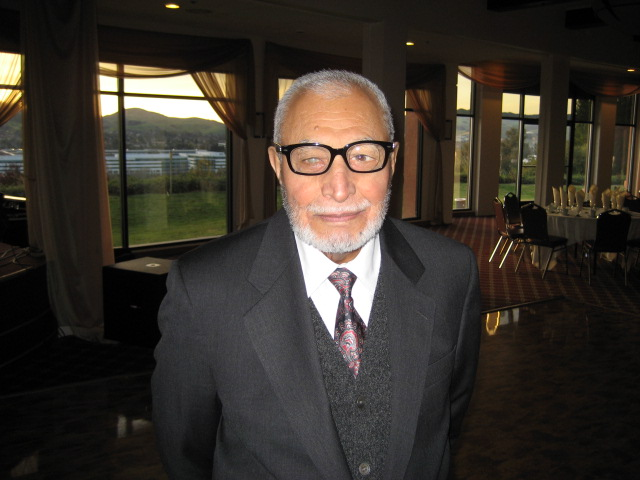
Safi in January 2007.

General Safi did attend a Loya Jirga under President Najibullah. The Defense Ministry eventually honored Safi's service by putting his name and biography officially as the leading instructor of Course-e-Haa and Air Defense. Also during this period Safi was given a diplomatic passport and all his travel restrictions were removed. Safi left for India in 1989 before settling in United States in 1997. General Safi died of natural causes on July 26, 2009. Safi's grave site is located in Sacramento Muslim Cemetery in northern California. He left behind his second wife and twelve children.
