= Khan Mohammad Khan =

Major General Khan Mohammad khan خان محمد خان MH-FSGC
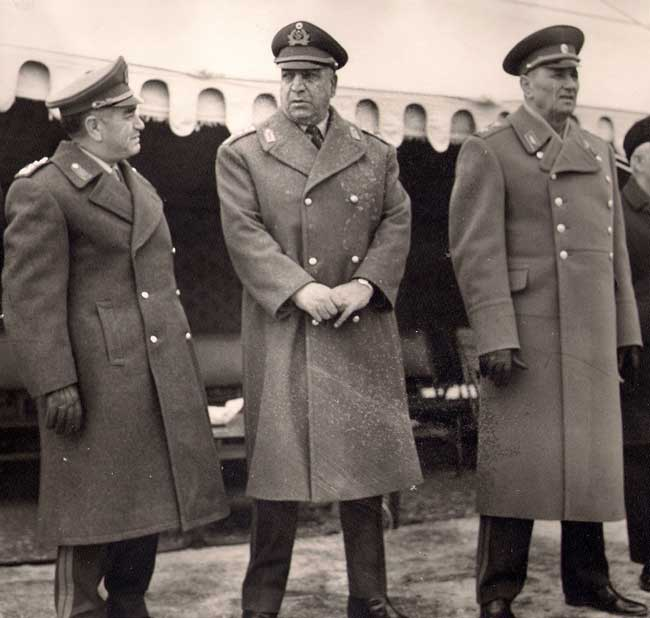
- Khan Mohammad Khan Next to General Maiwand in the middle.

Minister of Defense of Afghanistan
- In office 1963–1973
- Preceded by: Mohammad Daoud Khan
- Succeeded by: Mohammad Daoud Khan

Personal details
- Born: 1911 Emirate of Afghanistan
- Died: 2006 (aged 94–95) United States of America
- Occupation: Military General
- Awards: Medal of Honour for Faithful Service and Good Conduct; Order of the Sun Merit Medals

Military service
- Allegiance: Kingdom of Afghanistan
- Branch/service: Royal Afghan Army
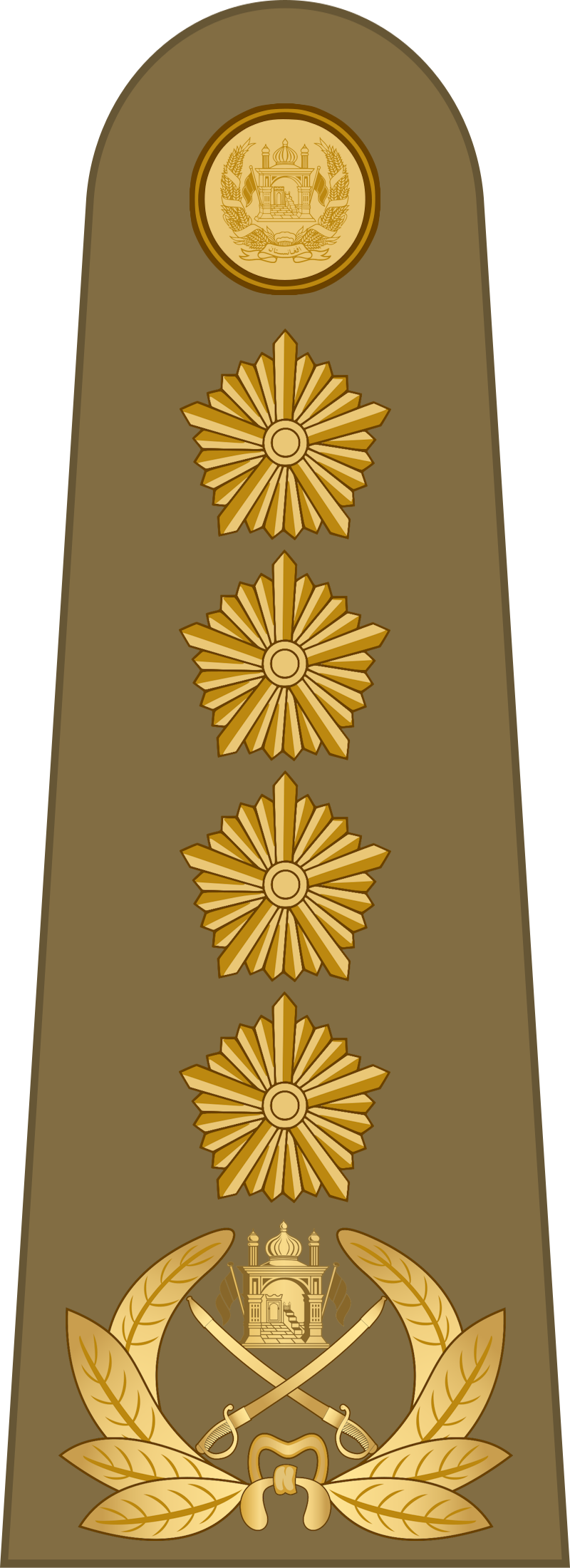
- Rank: Major General
- Battles/wars: 1961 Kunar incursion

Khan Mohammad Khan (Pashto: خان محمد خان) was a general in the Royal Afghan Army who served as the Minister of Defense of Afghanistan in 1961.
