= Zar Ajam =

Pakistani teenager executed for terrorism

- زار عجم
- Ajam in a BBC News interview shortly before his execution
- Born: Zar Ajam; 1993 or 1994; North Waziristan, Pakistan
- Died: 20 June 2011 (aged 17); Pul-e-Charkhi prison, Kabul, Afghanistan
- Status: Executed by hanging
- Conviction: Terrorism
- Criminal charge: Terrorism
- Penalty: Death (18 May 2011)

Details
- Date apprehended: 19 February 2011

Zar Ajam (Pashto: زار عجم; 1993/1994 – 20 June 2011) was a Pakistani teenager and convicted mass murderer and terrorist who was executed by hanging in Afghanistan for the February 2011 attack on the New Kabul Bank in Jalalabad, which left 40 people dead.

Ajam showed remorse and apologized for his actions shortly before his execution. He was 17.

== Case ==
Ajam was born in 1993 or 1994 in North Waziristan District in Pakistan. He dropped out of school at the age of seven and never learned to read or write. In his childhood, he began to work as a day laborer and had no economic stability, reporting his last job in Pakistan as a gravel maker. He did not know his age when interviewed by the BBC in 2011 and had never heard of Islamabad, his country's capital, prior to the attacks. Ajam was recruited by the Taliban–Haqqani network as a child suicide bomber, a practice that saw a peak in the 2010s in Afghanistan. In February 2011, Ajam was given an Afghan National Police uniform, an AK-47 rifle, and a suicide vest to attack the New Kabul Bank building in Jalalabad, in the eastern Nangarhar Province.

On 19 February 2011, Ajam and other four men, including a local man from Kunar Province carried out a terrorist attack on the New Kabul Bank in Jalalabad. Ajam was one of five attackers; of these, the Afghan National Army and Police shot and killed one of them, while another detonated his suicide vest, killing himself. Ajam and one Afghan accomplice indiscriminately shot at the bank's customers, mostly government employees lining for their salaries. A total of 40 people were killed in the attack and more than 100 others were wounded.

Ajam attempted to escape by taking off his suicide vest and uniform and blending into the crowd. However, he and his accomplice (identified only as Matiullah) were quickly identified and arrested at the scene. Police took Ajam to a local prison in Nangarhar. The three surviving terrorists, including Ajam, were charged with terrorism and quickly tried.

On 2 May 2011, a primary provincial court found the defendants guilty as charged and referred the sentencing to an appellate court which, on 18 May 2011, sentenced them to death. Ajam and the other two men appealed the sentence to the Supreme Court. On 29 May 2011, the Supreme Court ratified the death sentences for Ajam and Matiullah, reducing the punishment of death to 20 years in prison for the third defendant, Allah Dad.

== Execution ==
The attack drew strong condemnation from locals in Nangarhar and president Hamid Karzai, who demanded the Supreme Court to impose "harsh punishments" to the terrorists.

Upon interrogation, Ajam said that he had received training from Taliban official Maulvi Abdul Karim (later Afghanistan's Deputy Minister of Justice) while he lived in North Waziristan. He testified that he "enjoyed the killings" and that he had been told that "killing everyone inside the Kabul Bank was halal".

Ajam was taken by car from Pakistan to Afghanistan three days before the attack, visiting the Bank one day before. During an interview from the Pul-e-Charkhi prison in Kabul with ABC News shortly before his execution, Ajam admitted responsibility and showed remorse for his actions, saying that if he had the chance, he would not do that again. However before the ABC interview, he had told BBC News the opposite in another interview, reaffirming that he was convinced that what he did was right.

He recounted an experience during his stay in prison in Jalalabad, saying that his cell's window was open, and he heard a call to prayer. When he looked outside, Ajam reported seeing a police officer praying and that he realized that those he shot in the Bank were innocent people and Muslims too.

He also said that he was told by the Taliban that the people inside the Kabul Bank were foreigners dressed in local clothes and speaking Pashto because they were "afraid of them [the Taliban]".

Karzai, facing pressure to execute convicted terrorists, signed Ajam's and Matiullah's death warrants in early June 2011 and a spokesman for the Ministry of Justice confirmed that they had been executed by hanging on 20 June 2011 at Pul-e-Charkhi prison.

Taliban spokesman Zabihullah Mujahid condemned the executions, calling them "martyrs" and vowing to seek revenge. Similarly, Sirajuddin Haqqani of the Haqqani network vowed to target judges and the courts in response to the hangings. The insurgents had insisted that it was not a civilian attack and that the victims were military targets.

The Anti-Death Penalty Asia Network and Amnesty International condemned the executions, especially Ajam's because he was a juvenile offender.

Ajam's body was handed over to Pakistani authorities in Afghanistan. The executions of Ajam and Matiullah were the first hangings authorized by Karzai, who was hesitant to issue death warrants. Previous executions under Karzai were carried out by shooting.
