= Abdullah Yaqta =

Interim Prime Minister of Afghanistan (1914–2003)

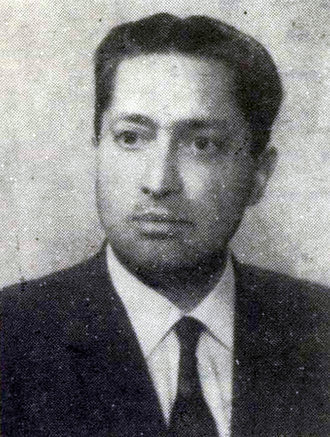
- Yaqta in 1946

First Deputy Prime Minister of Afghanistan
- In office 1967–1971
- Prime Minister: Mohammad Nur Ahmad Etemadi

Minister of Finance of Afghanistan
- In office November 1965 – January 1967
- Prime Minister: Mohammad Daoud Khan
- In office 1959–1965
- Prime Minister: Mohammad Yusuf Khan

Minister of Planning and Minister without Portfolio
- In office March 1965 – November 1965
- Prime Minister: Mohammad Yusuf Khan
- In office 1967–1967
- Prime Minister: Mohammad Hashim Maiwandwal

Personal details
- Born: 1918 Kabul, Emirate of Afghanistan
- Died: 17 July 2003 (aged 84–85) Ventura, California, United States
- Party: Independent
- Education: Kabul University (BSc), Faculty of Economics at the University of Tokyo (since 1935)

Abdullah Yaqta, also known as Abdullah Yaftali (1918 – 17 July 2003) was a politician from Afghanistan.

Yaftali was appointed as director of the department of income tax in 1949. He worked in the ministry of planning in 1950s. He was appointed as deputy minister of planning in 1962, minister of planning in 1962, minister of finance (November 1965 to January 1967) and minister of planning in 1967. He was Second Deputy Prime Minister in 1967 and First Deputy Prime Minister from 1969 to 1971.

He was acting Prime Minister of Afghanistan from 11 October to 1 November 1967.

Yaftali was born in Kabul. He is a Tajik. He later emigrated to the United States, where he died.
