= Abdul Rashid Arian =

Afghan politician

- عبد الرشید آریان

Vice Chairman of the Revolutionary Council
- In office June 1981 – 1988
- President: Babrak Karmal, Mohammed Najibullah

Deputy Prime Minister of Afghanistan
- In office 1980–1981
- President: Babrak Karmal

Minister of Justice
- In office 1980–1981
- President: Babrak Karmal

Ambassador of Afghanistan to Pakistan
- In office 1978–1980

Member of the House of Elders
- In office 1988–1990

Personal details
- Born: November 1941 (age 84) Kandahar, Kingdom of Afghanistan
- Party: People's Democratic Party of Afghanistan
- Occupation: Politician, Journalist

Abdul Rashid Arian is an Afghan politician formerly affiliated with the People's Democratic Party of Afghanistan.

Arian was born in Kandahar in November 1941. He worked as a journalist in Kandahar before joining the People's Democratic Party of Afghanistan, where he became the secretary of the Kandahar provincial committee. In 1973, he became an alternate member of the party's central committee, and a full member in 1977.

In 1978, Arian became a member of the Revolutionary Council of the Democratic Republic of Afghanistan. He was appointed ambassador to Pakistan in 1978 and served until 1980. In 1980, Babrak Karmal appointed him as Deputy Prime Minister and minister of justice, positions he held until 1981.

Arian was one of the vice chairmen of the Revolutionary Council from June 1981 to 1988 under Babrak Karmal and Mohammad Najibullah. In 1988, he was elected to the House of Elders. He was expelled from the government in 1990.
