= Abdul Hakim Katawazi =

Brigadier General Abdul Hakim Katawazi عبدالحکیم کتوازی MH-FSGC
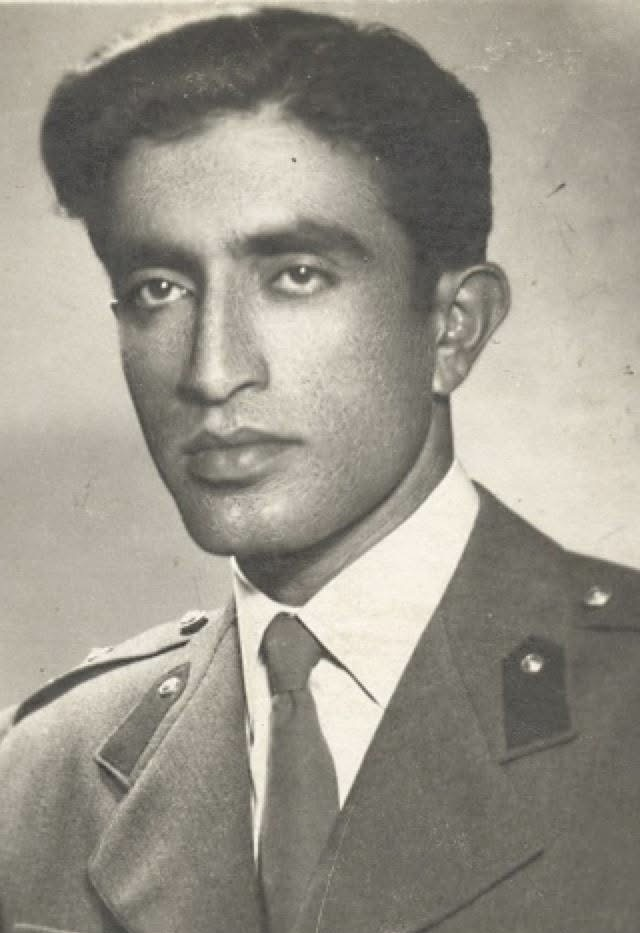
- Official Portrait of Abdul Hakim Katawazi in 1950s

Commander of the Junior Officers’ School
- In office 1957–1960

Director General of the Ministry of Defense
- In office 1962–1965

Chief of Police of Kabul
- In office 1965–1969

7th Infantry Division in the Central Corps
- In office 1969–1973

Personal details
- Born: 1925 Kherkoot Kotwazi, Paktika, Kingdom of Afghanistan
- Died: 2 November 1995; Aged (70) Peshawar, Pakistan
- Education: Rashidya Military School, Yohanton Military Academy, Turkish Military Academy
- Occupation: Military Officer
- Awards: Medal of Honour for Faithful Service and Good Conduct

Military service
- Allegiance: Kingdom of Afghanistan
- Branch/service: Royal Afghan Army
- Years of service: 1957-1973
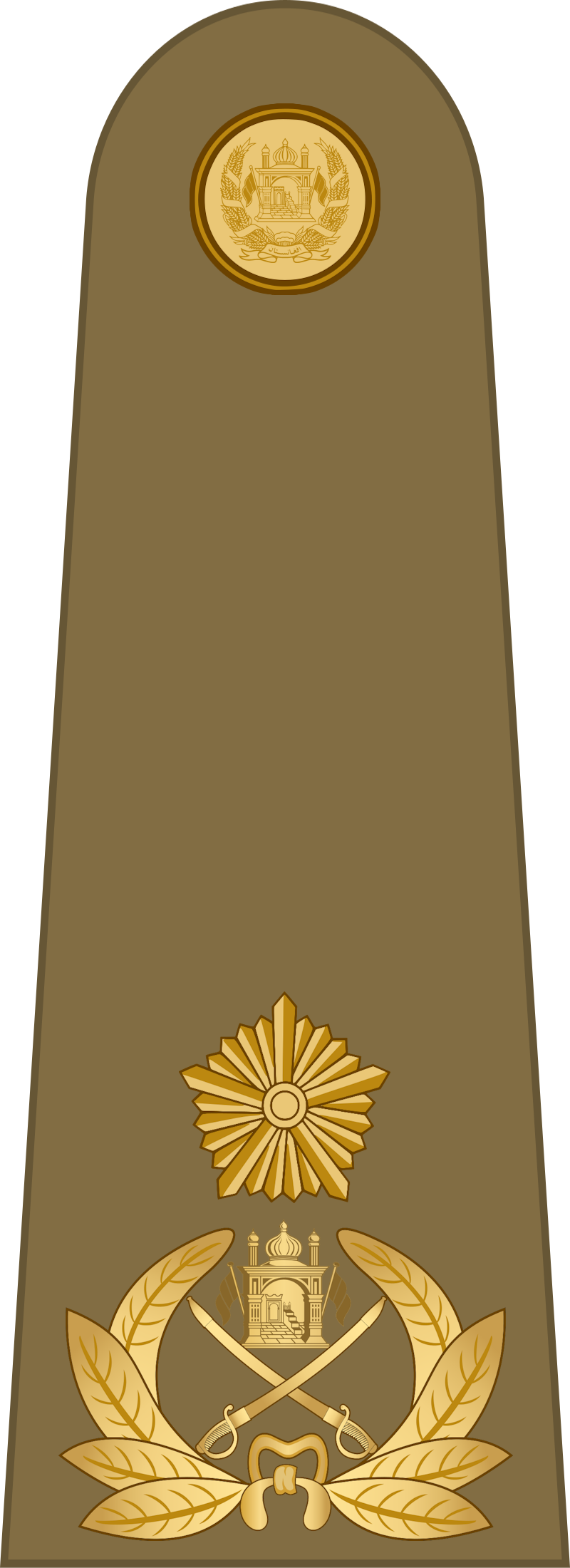
- Rank: Brigadier General
- Commands: 7 Mechanized Infantry Division

Abdul Hakim Katawazi was a Brigadier General in the Royal Afghan Army, where he served as the commander of the 7 Mechanized Infantry Division in the Central Corps.

== Military career ==
From 1957 to 1960, Katawazi was in charge of the Junior Officers’ School, where he trained new military officers. From 1962 to 1965, he served as the Director General of the Ministry of Defense. After that, he became the Chief of Police in Kabul from 1965 to 1969. He later commanded the 7th Infantry Division, one of the country's main military units, until the coup d’état in 1973.

== Early life and education ==
Katawazi was born into a religious family in Kherkoot Kotwazi, Paktika province.At the age of eight, he moved with his father and uncle to Kabul. During this time, his father and uncle were imprisoned due to political unrest in their home region. While his father was imprisoned, Katawazi and his brother attended the Rashidya Military School.

== Imprisonment ==
Following the 1973 Afghan coup d’état, Katawazi was imprisoned for his loyalty to King Zahir Shah, but he was later released. Katawazi was imprisoned again after the Saur Revolution in 1978, but he avoided execution because General Sayed Abdul Ghani Wardak testified that Katawazi was not involved in the coup against the communist government.
