= Mohammed Naim Khan =

Afghan politician

Sardar Sardar Muhammad Naim Khan
- سردار محمد نعیم خان
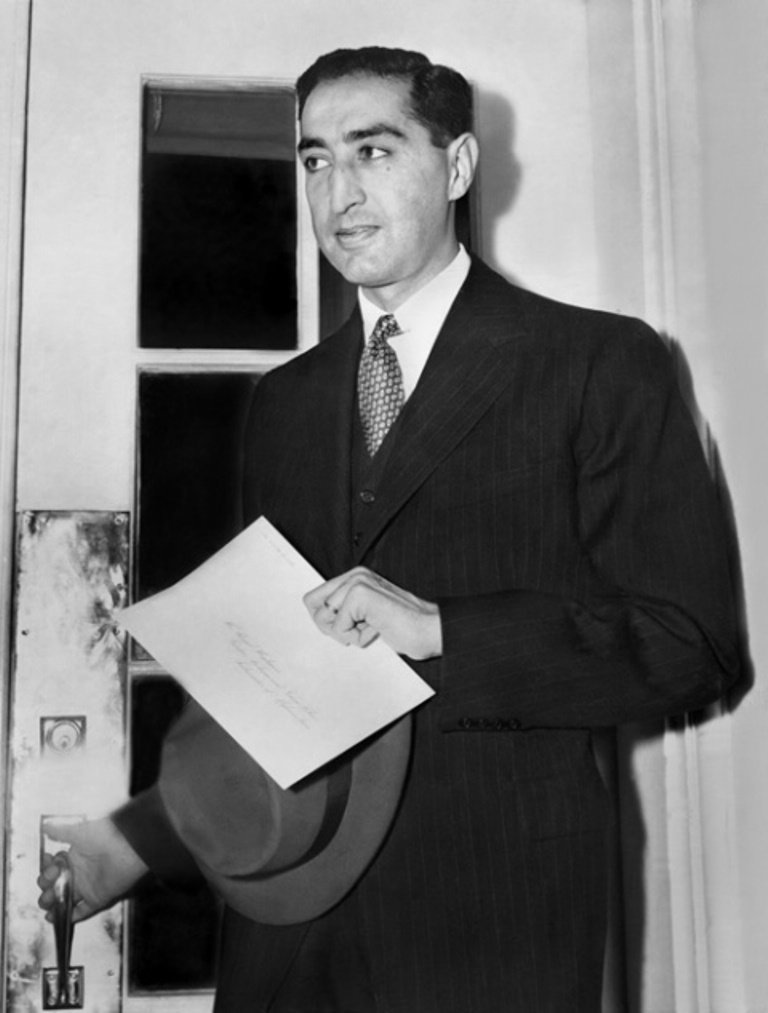
- Mohammad Naim Khan When he was Ambassador of Afghanistan in the United States 1948

Minister of Education
- In office 1937

Acting Foreign Minister
- In office 1937, 1938

Assistant to the Prime Minister
- In office 1939

Officiating Minister of National Economy
- In office 1941

Officiating Prime Minister
- In office Winter 1943

Ambassador to the United Kingdom
- In office 1946

Ambassador to the United States
- In office 1948

Minister of Public Works
- In office 1949–1950

Personal details
- Born: 1911 Kabul, Emirate of Afghanistan
- Died: April 27, 1978 (aged 66–67) Kabul, Democratic Republic of Afghanistan
- Spouse: Eldest sister of King Zahir Shah (m. 1934)
- Parent(s): Mohammad Aziz Khan (father); Khurshid Begum (mother)

Military service
- Allegiance: Afghanistan
- Battles/wars: Saur Revolution †

Sardar Muhammad Naim Khan (1911 – 27 April 1978) was an Afghan politician, a member of the Barakzai royal family, the brother-in-law of King Zahir Shah, and the brother of Daoud Khan.

== Early life and education ==
Sardar Muhammad Naim Khan was born in 1911 to Sardar Muhammad Aziz Khan, a member of the Muhammadzai clan of the Barakzai dynasty. He was educated in Afghanistan and abroad, and married the eldest sister of King Zahir Shah in 1934.

== Political career ==
=== Early Government Positions (1930–1950) ===
Naim Khan entered the Afghan government in 1930 as an Under-Secretary in the Foreign Office, was appointed Minister to Italy in 1932 until 1934, and later served in various roles including Extra Secretary and First Secretary in the Foreign Ministry, before becoming Minister of Education in 1937; he also served as Acting Foreign Minister in 1937 and 1938, Assistant to the Prime Minister in 1939, Officiating Minister of National Economy in 1941, and Officiating Prime Minister in 1943; in 1953, he was appointed Deputy Prime Minister and Foreign Minister under Prime Minister Mohammad Daoud Khan, where he played a key role in shaping Afghanistan’s foreign policy, meeting world leaders such as U.S. President John F. Kennedy in 1962, and securing foreign aid while maintaining Afghanistan’s neutral stance in the Cold War.

== Assassination (1978) ==
On April 27, 1978, the Saur Revolution led by the People’s Democratic Party of Afghanistan (PDPA) overthrew the government of Mohammad Daoud Khan. During the coup, Naim Khan and his family were assassinated alongside Mohammad Daoud Khan at the Presidential Palace in Kabul.

== See also ==
- Daoud khan
