= Maulvi Abdul Karim =

Afghan Deputy Minister of Justice

Maulvi Abdul Karim مولوی عبدالکریم

Deputy Minister of Justice
- Incumbent
- Assumed office 14 March 2022 (Note: Acting: 14 March 2022 – 15 August 2025)
- Prime Minister: Mohammad Hassan Akhund
- Minister: Abdul Hakim Sharie
- Leader: Hibatullah Akhundzada

Personal details
- Party: Taliban
- Occupation: Politician, Taliban member

Maulvi Abdul Karim is an Afghan leader of the Taliban militant organization and currently the Deputy Minister of Justice since 14 March 2022. Karim has also been a member of the Taliban negotiating team in Qatar office.

In June 2011, shortly before being executed, teenage terrorist Zar Ajam confessed to have received training from Karim while he resided in North Waziristan, Pakistan.

Karim is from Herat province. He is considered a close associate of Mullah Baradar.
