= Abdur Rahim Khan (governor) =

Afghan governor

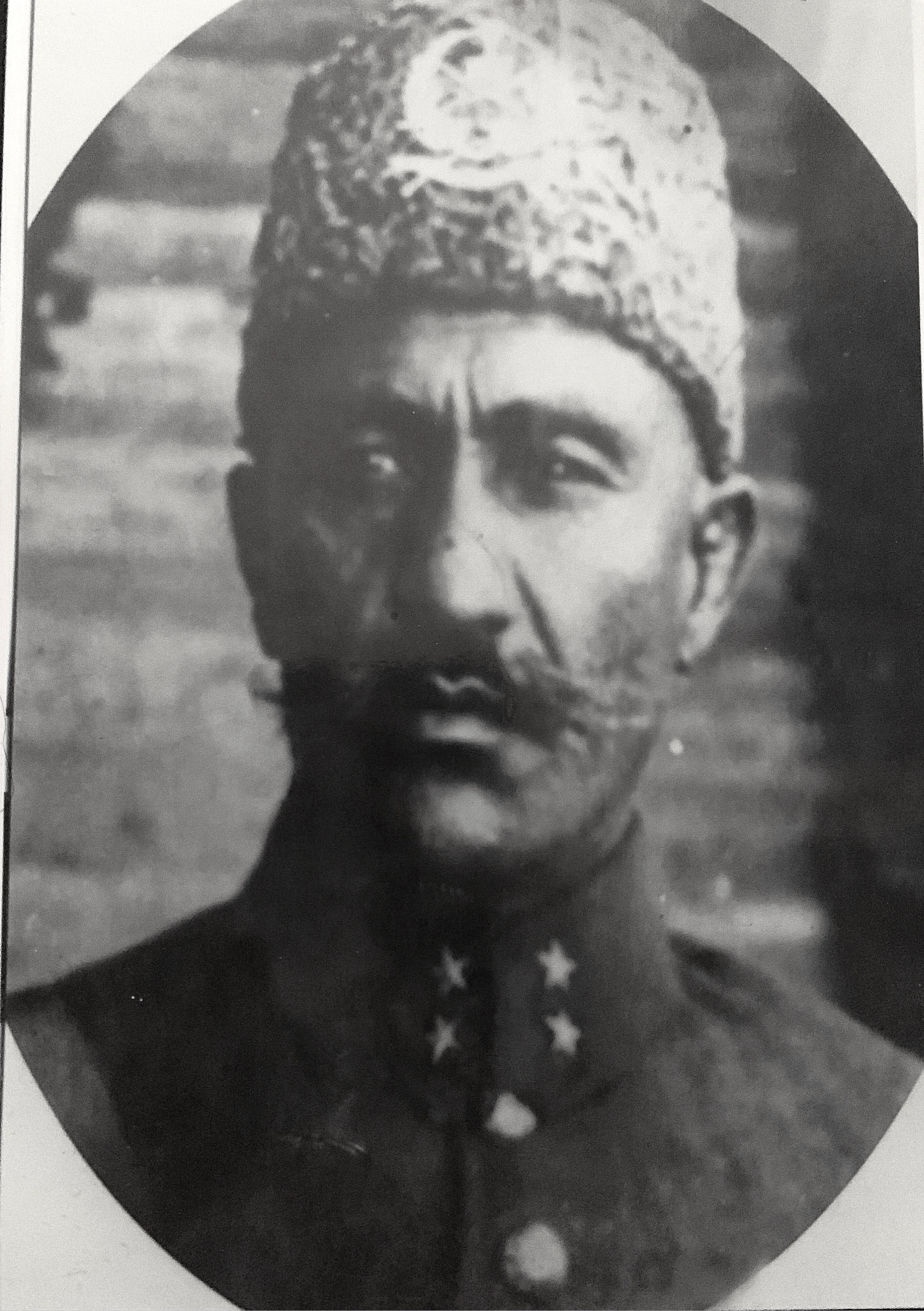
- General Abdur Rahim Khan

Governor of Herat
- In office September 1932 – September 1934
- Appointed by: Mohammed Nadir Shah
- Succeeded by: Ghulam Faruq Usman

Personal details
- Born: 1886 Kohistan, Emirate of Afghanistan

Military service
- Battles/wars: Afghan Civil War (1928–1929); Afghan tribal revolts of 1944–1947 (Suspected)

Abdur Rahim Khan (عبدالرحیم‌ خان) was an Afghan governor of Herat. He was born in 1886 in Kohistan. He served as the commander of Habibullah Khan's bodyguard from age 16. In 1921 he was promoted to brigadier. During the Afghan Civil War of 1928-1929 he joined the Saqqawists and was sent to Mazar-i-Sharif to organize a revolution. In September 1932 he was appointed by Mohammed Nadir Shah as governor of Herat. Also in 1932, he prevented a mutiny in Herat. He was appointed head of Perso-Afghan Boundary Commission in September 1934. He was appointed First Deputy Prime Minister in 1938, and then as Second Deputy Prime Minister in 1940. In January 1946, he was arrested for suspected complicity with the Safi during the Afghan tribal revolts of 1944–1947, together with his son-in-law Khalilullah Khalili. He was released in 1948.

In a book that was written by Abdul K. Safi, it states; "Late professor Ustad Khalili, writes about the event of capturing Herat. "Abdul Rahim Khan captured Herat without bloodshed. The garrison of Herat surrendered as soon as they heard Abdul Rahim Khan's name." He was a symbol of loyalty and peace. He was the minister of public work and deputy Prime Minister. One of Abdur Rahim Khan's sister was Khalilullah Khalili's mother. Later on Abdur Rahim Khan's daughter married Khalilullah Khalili.
