= Mohammad Hasan Sharq =

Prime Minister of Afghanistan

- محمد حسن شرق

Chairman of the Council of Ministers Head of Government
- In office 26 May 1988 – 21 February 1989
- President: Mohammad Najibullah
- Preceded by: Sultan Ali Keshtmand
- Succeeded by: Sultan Ali Keshtmand

Deputy Chancellor of Afghanistan
- In office 2 August 1973 – 1975
- Chancellor: Mohammad Daud Khan

Personal details
- Born: 17 July 1925 (age 101) Anar Dara District, Emirate of Afghanistan
- Party: Independent

Mohammad Hasan Sharq (Dari/Pashto: محمد حسن شرق, born 17 July 1925) is an Afghan former communist politician (belonging to the Parcham faction of the People's Democratic Party of Afghanistan (PDPA)) who was active in the communist government of Afghanistan. Sharq became Chairman of the Council of Ministers – the government of the Soviet-backed Democratic Republic of Afghanistan. He was selected as a compromise candidate after a loya jirga ratified a new constitution in 1987. However, the power of his office was relatively slight compared with the powers held by the presidency.

== Career ==
Sharq served as spokesman for earlier Chairman of the Council of Ministers Mohammad Daoud Khan during the Kingdom of Afghanistan. When Daoud took over the cabinet posts of Prime Minister, Defense Minister and Foreign Minister, he appointed Sharq as his Deputy Prime Minister. Sharq was Deputy Prime Minister from 1973 to 1975 and First Deputy Prime Minister from 1975 to 1978. He was also Daoud's Minister of Finance from 1975 to about 1976. He also served as spokesman for then prime minister Daud Khan and his Milli Ghurzang Party, as well as being the Afghan ambassador to Japan.

In March 1986, Afghan foreign minister Abdul Wakil invited mujahideen leaders, former king Zahir Shah and ex-ministers from previous governments to join a government of national unity. The new parliament that convened on May 30, 1989, two weeks after the Geneva Accords became effective and the beginning of the Soviet troop withdrawal in 1989, consisted of 184 lower-house deputies and 115 senators; 62 house and 82 senate seats were left vacant for the resistance "opposition". As a compromise candidate, Sharq was selected by President Mohammad Najibullah to be the new Chairman of the Council of Ministers, replacing Sultan Ali Keshtmand. The appointment was intended dramatically to reinforce the point that the People's Democratic Party of Afghanistan (PDPA) was going to take a backseat. The new constitution, however, vested key powers in the presidency and Najibullah did not give up that central role.

Sharq had served as the regime's Deputy Chairman of the Council of Ministers since June 1987 and before that as its Ambassador to India. Sharq's association with the Parcham communist faction, dating back to the Daoud government, made the "non-PDPA" appellation meaningless. Likewise, on June 7, when Sharq announced his cabinet, consisting of 11 new members and 10 former ones, the non-party credentials of the "new" ministers were undermined by the fact that most had served the regime government previously in other capacities. Furthermore, the powerful ministries of interior, state security, and foreign affairs remained in PDPA hands. The major exception was the effort to enlist a resistance commander or a respected retired general from an earlier era as minister of defense. This post remained vacant for nearly two months, but in August it was finally given to Army Chief of Staff General Shahnawaz Tanai of the Khalq communist faction.

Thus, almost two years after he announced the national reconciliation policy in January 1987, Najibullah was unable to attract a single major figure of the resistance or prominent Afghan refugee to join the government. During 1988, two new provinces were created - Sar-e-Pol in the north and Nuristan in the northeast - by carving out territory from adjoining provinces. In each case, the purpose appears to have been to create a new entity where an ethnic minority, the Hazaras and Nuristanis respectively, would dominate. This readjustment would guarantee representation in the new parliament for these ethnic groups. At the same time, the Sharq government abolished the special ministry for nationalities that carried connotations of a Soviet-style system. In February 1989, Sharq resigned from the government of Najibullah, a move underscoring the failure by Afghans to establish a government of national reconciliation. A resident of the Anar Dara district in the western Farah province, Sharq was prime minister in the Najibullah government from 1986 to 1990.

== Cabinet ==
Office	Incumbent	Took office	Left office
Chairman of the Council of Ministers	Mohammad Hasan Sharq	16 June 1988	21 February 1989
Minister of Foreign Affairs	Abdul Wakil	16 June 1988	
Minister of Defence	Lieut. Gen. Shahnawaz Tanai	16 June 1988	
Minister of Interior	Maj. Gen. Sayed Mohammad Gulabzoy	16 June 1988	
Minister of State Security	Gen. Ghulam Faruq Yaqubi	16 June 1988	
Minister of Finance	Hamidullah Tarzi	16 June 1988	
Minister of Justice	Muhammad Bashir Baghlani	16 June 1988	
Permanent Representative to the United Nations	Shah Muhammad Dost	16 June 1988	
Minister of Communications	General Mohammad Aslam Watanjar	16 June 1988	
Minister of Commerce	Mohammad Khan Jalallar	16 June 1988	
Minister of Returnees Affairs	Abdul Ghafur	16 June 1988	
Minister of Tribal Affairs	Sulaiman Layeq	16 June 1988	
Minister of Planning	Sultan Husain	16 June 1988	
Minister of Rural Development	Mohammad Asef Zaher	16 June 1988	
Minister of Agriculture, Land Reform	Muhammad Ghofran	16 June 1988	
Minister of Public Health	Abdul Fatah Najm	16 June 1988	
Minister of Education	Ghulam Rasul	16 June 1988	
Minister of Higher Education	Nur Ahmad Barits	16 June 1988	
Minister of Mines, Industry	Muhammad Ishaq Kawa	16 June 1988	
Minister of Transport	Muhammad Aziz	16 June 1988	
Minister of Construction	Nazar Muhammad	16 June 1988	
Minister of Civil Aviation	Pacha Gul Wafadar	16 June 1988	
Minister of Light Industry, Foodstuffs	Dost Muhammad Fazl	16 June 1988	
Minister of Water, Power	Raz Muhammad Paktin	16 June 1988	
Minister of Information	Ahmad Bashir Ruigar	9 July 1988	
Minister without Portfolio	Nematullah Pazhwak	16 June 1988	
Minister without Portfolio	Gen. Ghulam Faruq Yaqubi	16 June 1988	
Minister without Portfolio	Fazl Haq Khaliqyar	16 June 1988	
Minister without Portfolio	Shah Muhammad Dost	16 June 1988	
Minister without Portfolio	Sarjang Khan Jaji	16 June 1988	
Adamec, Ludwig (2011). Historical Dictionary of Afghanistan. Scarecrow Press. pp. 80–81. ISBN 978-0-8108-7815-0.

== See also ==
- List of oldest living state leaders
- List of living centenarians

Political offices
Preceded by Unknown	Deputy Prime Minister of Afghanistan; 1973 – 1978	Succeeded by Unknown
Preceded by Unknown	Deputy Prime Minister of Afghanistan; June 1987 – 1987	Succeeded by Abdul Rahim Hatef
Preceded by Sultan Ali Keshtmand	Prime Minister of Afghanistan; 26 May 1988 – 21 February 1989	Succeeded by Sultan Ali Keshtmand
