= Medal of Honour for Faithful Service and Good Conduct =

- Presented by: Kingdom of Afghanistan
- Eligibility: Afghan citizens
- Ribbon
- Status: No longer awarded
- Established: 1942
- Final award: 1972

The Medal of Honour for Faithful Service and Good Conduct was an award of the Kingdom of Afghanistan established in 1942 and awarded by King Zahir Shah to military officers in recognition of their exemplary service and conduct.

== Notable recipients ==
- Abdul Hakim Katawazi
- Sardar Shah Wali Khan
- Mohammed Asif Safi
