= Shir Giyan =

Afghan politician

Shir Giyan served as Prime Minister of the Emirate of Afghanistan from January 1929 to November 1, 1929. He was preceded by Shir Ahmad and was succeeded by Mohammad Hashim Khan after being deposed. He died in 1929.

== See also ==
· · ·
