= Shir Ahmad =

Sirdar Shir Ahmad Sura-i-Milli served as Prime Minister of the Kingdom of Afghanistan from October 25, 1927, to January 1929. He was succeeded by Shir Giyan after being deposed. He was born circa 1885.
