= Progressive Democratic Party of Afghanistan =

Political party in Afghanistan

- Leader: Mohammad Wali Arya
- Founder: Mohammad Hashim Maiwandwal
- Founded: 1966

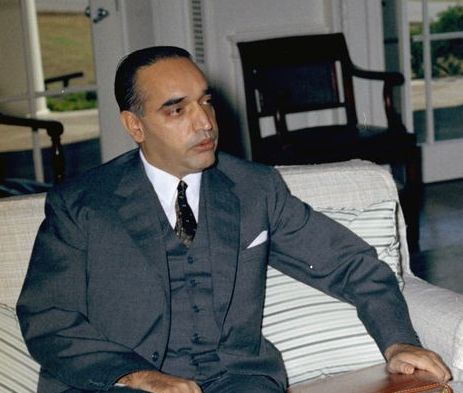
Mohammad Hashim Maiwandwal, founder of the party

Progressive Democratic Party of Afghanistan (Persian: حزب مترقی دموکرات افغانستان) is a political party in Afghanistan, founded in 1966. It was led by Mohammad Hashim Maiwandwal, who was prime minister from 1965 to 1967.

The party and its followers were generally known by the name of the party newspaper, Musawat.

The party has recently reemerged as a legal party, and is registered with the Ministry of Justice. It is led by Mohammad Wali Arya who resides in the United States of America at the moment.
