= Mohammad Yusuf (politician) =

Afghan politician (1917–1998)

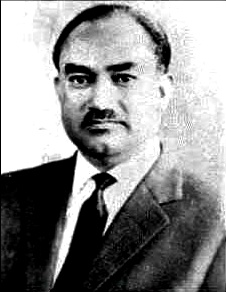
- Yusuf in 1966

Prime Minister of Afghanistan
- In office 10 March 1963 – 2 November 1965
- Monarch: Mohammed Zahir Shah
- Preceded by: Mohammed Daoud Khan
- Succeeded by: Mohammad Hashim Maiwandwal

Foreign Minister of Afghanistan
- In office 1963–1965

Personal details
- Born: January 21, 1917 Kabul, Emirate of Afghanistan
- Died: January 23, 1998 (aged 81) Germany
- Party: Independent
- Education: Ludwig-Maximilians-Universität München; University of Göttingen

Mohammad Yusuf (January 21, 1917 – January 23, 1998) was Prime Minister and Foreign Minister of Afghanistan from March 10, 1963, to November 2, 1965. Yusuf was a technocrat and served under the reign of Mohammed Zahir Shah. He was born into a Tajik family in Chindawol, Kabul. He is considered the first Afghan prime minister to not be part of the royal family. He resigned on October 29, 1965.

Yusuf's predecessor, Mohammed Daoud Khan, had made him Minister of Mines and Industries in 1953, a position in which he would serve for 10 years (prior to which he had been Deputy Minister of Education from 1949 to 1953). After serving as prime minister, he was appointed Ambassador to the Soviet Union, but left this post in 1973 following Daoud Khan's coup. When the Soviets invaded Afghanistan in 1979, he went into exile in Germany, where he lived until his death. His family moved to the west during the fall of the Communist Regime in Afghanistan, to the United States.

Before his political career, Yusuf had a tenure as a professor at Kabul University for over three decades, starting in 1949.

Political offices
Preceded by Mohammed Daoud Khan	Prime Minister of Afghanistan; 1963–1965	Succeeded by Mohammad Hashim Maiwandwal
