= Mohammad Hashim Maiwandwal =

Afghan politician (1921–1973)

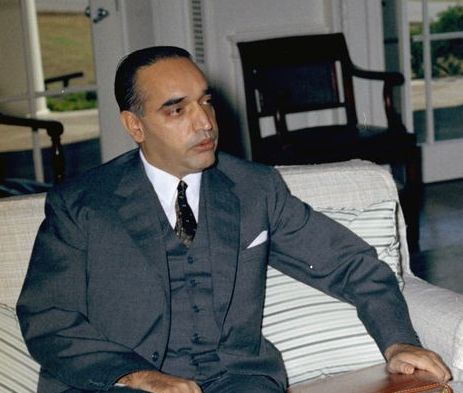
- Maiwandwal during a meeting with U.S. President John F. Kennedy in the Oval Office on October 4, 1961

Prime Minister of Afghanistan
- In office 2 November 1965 – 11 October 1967
- Monarch: Mohammed Zahir Shah
- Preceded by: Mohammad Yusuf
- Succeeded by: Abdullah Yaqta (acting)

5th Ambassador of Afghanistan to the United States
- In office 1958–1963
- Monarch: Mohammed Zahir Shah
- Preceded by: Najib Ullah
- Succeeded by: Abdul Majid

Personal details
- Born: 12 March 1921 Kabul, Emirate of Afghanistan
- Died: 20 October 1973 (aged 52) Kabul, Republic of Afghanistan
- Cause of death: Assassination by suffocation
- Party: Progressive Democratic Party of Afghanistan
- Spouse: Sultana Malikyar

Mohammad Hashim Maiwandwal (Dari: محمد هاشم میوندوال; 12 March 1921 – 20 October 1973) was an Afghan politician and diplomat during the reign of Zahir Shah. His death in prison is believed to have resulted from torture.

== Biography ==
Mohammad Hashim, son of a preacher originally from Bukhara, modern-day Uzbekistan, became a journalist after graduating from high school, editing several newspapers. During the 1950s, he was appointed as the Kingdom of Afghanistan's ambassador to the United Kingdom, the United States and Pakistan from 1955 to 1963.

In October 1965, following the election of the new legislature, an impasse over its approval of the new cabinet brought rioting and an intervention by the army, leading to the death of at least three student demonstrators. The proposed cabinet was withdrawn, and the formation of a new one under the leadership of Muhammad Hashim Maiwandwal was approved with little opposition. Nominated by the King, he quickly established friendly relations with the students, while making it clear that he was in charge and there were going to be limits to student political activity.

He served as Prime Minister of Afghanistan from November 2, 1965 until October 11, 1967. He also served as Minister of information and culture. He resigned due to ill health. Maiwandwal had no children, and he left all his property his nephew, who had moved to Canada, but it was taken by the state.

In 1966 he founded the Jam’iat Demokrate-ye Mottaraqi (Progressive Democratic Party), a leftist monarchist party. It advocated evolutionary socialism and parliamentary democracy. Maiwandwal, who was elected in 1965, lost his seat when the government selectively influenced the elections.

== Arrest and death ==
The rise of Prince Mohammad Daoud Khan to power after the 1973 coup was galling to other would-be successors, such as Sardar Abdul Wali, who was quickly put behind bars. A coup attempt, which may have been planned before Daoud took power, was subdued shortly after his coup. Whether Maiwandwal was in on the plot from the start is open to question, but his pro-Western reputation may explain why he was chosen for its leadership. This led to the arrest of Maiwandwal and twenty others on September 20, 1973, including the newly promoted chief of air staff, two serving lieutenant generals, five colonels and one member of the now defunct Wolesi Jirga.

Maiwandwal was known to be anti-communist and the communists regarded him as an obstacle to their ideology. It is said that the news of Maiwandwal's arrest for conspiracy in the aborted coup was surprising to many, as he was liked by President Daoud, and Maiwandwal considered Mohammad Naim, President Daoud's brother, as a mentor when serving in the Foreign Affairs Ministry. The Parcham faction of the PDPA controlled the Ministry of Interior, and they feared the likely scenario of Daoud pardoning Maiwandwal and actually reinstating him in the government. On October 20, 1973, he was said to have committed suicide while awaiting trial, after a staged investigation. He died in prison at a time when Parchamites controlled the Ministry of Interior under circumstances corroborating the widespread belief that he had been tortured to death.

His body was secretly buried by the police department in the Shuhada-e Saliheen graveyard in southern Kabul, which was discovered in 2004 by Daoud Malikyar.

It has been suggested that Maiwandwal's death at the hands of the Parchamites led to President Daoud Khan purging Parchamites from his cabinet in the following years.

Political offices
Preceded by Mohammad Yusuf	Prime Minister of Afghanistan; 1965–1967	Succeeded by Abdullah Yaqta; Acting
