= Sardar Shah Wali Khan =

Field Marshal of Kingdom of Afghanistan

Ghazi Shah Wali Khan OSS MH-FSGC
- سردار شاه ولی خان

Commander of Royal Bodyguard
- In office 1906–Unknown

Commander of Cavalry Corps
- In office 1921–Unknown

Equerry to King Amanullah
- In office 1924–Unknown

Chief-of-staff
- In office 1929–Unknown

Viceroy to King Nader Shah
- In office 1929–Unknown

Acting Minister for Defence
- In office 1935–1936

Acting Prime Minister of Afghanistan
- In office 1936–1937

Ambassador to Pakistan
- In office 1948–1949

Personal details
- Born: April 16, 1888
- Died: April 1977 (aged 88–89)
- Awards: Order of the Supreme Sun; Medal of Honour for Faithful Service and Good Conduct

Military service
- Allegiance: Kingdom of Afghanistan
- Branch/service: Royal Afghan Army
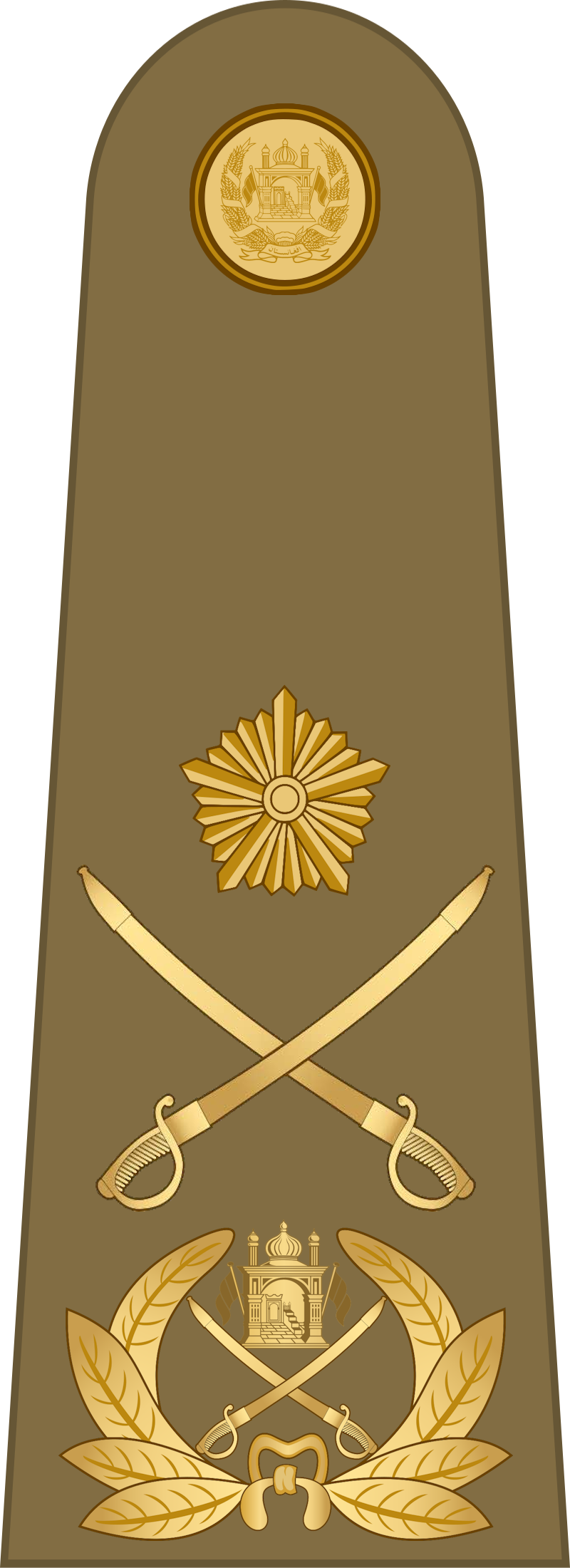
- Rank: Field Marshal
- Battles/wars: Third Anglo-Afghan War; Afghan Civil War (1928–1929); Basmachi movement Afghan tribal revolts of 1944–1947

Field Marshal Sardar Shah Wali Khan (Pashto: سردار شاه ولی خان) (April 16, 1888 – April 1977), also known as Field Marshal Sardar Shah Wali Khan Ghazi, was a political and military figure in Afghanistan. He was a member of the Musahiban and an uncle of both King Zahir and President Mohammed Daoud Khan. He was a full brother of Prime Minister Shah Mahmud Khan, King Mohammad Nadir Shah and paternal half-brother of Prime Minister Mohammad Hashim Khan.

He was the father of Lieutenant-General Abdul Wali Khan, cousin and senior power behind the throne of King Zahir during the 1963-1973 constitutional period and throughout their exile.

== Career ==
- Commander of Royal Bodyguard in 1906
- Commander of Cavalry Corps in 1921
- Equerry to King Amanullah in 1924
- Commander-in-chief of the army that defeated Habibullah Kalakani (also known as Bacha-ye Saqqow) and captured Kabul on 10 October 1929, for which he received the titles of Ghazi and Fateh-e-Kabul ("Conqueror of Kabul").
- Viceroy to King Nader Shah in 1929
- Acting Minister for Defence from 1935 to 1936
- Acting Prime Minister from 1936 to 1937
- Ambassador to Pakistan from 1948 to 1949.
