= Prime Minister of Afghanistan =

Head of government

Prime Minister of the Islamic Emirate of Afghanistan
- د افغانستان د اسلامي امارت لومړی وزیر (Pashto) Də Afġānistān Islāmī Imārat lomři ozīr; رئیس الوزرای امارت اسلامی افغانستان (Dari) Raʾīs al-ozrāi Imārat-i Islāmī-yi Afghānistān
- Emblem of Afghanistan

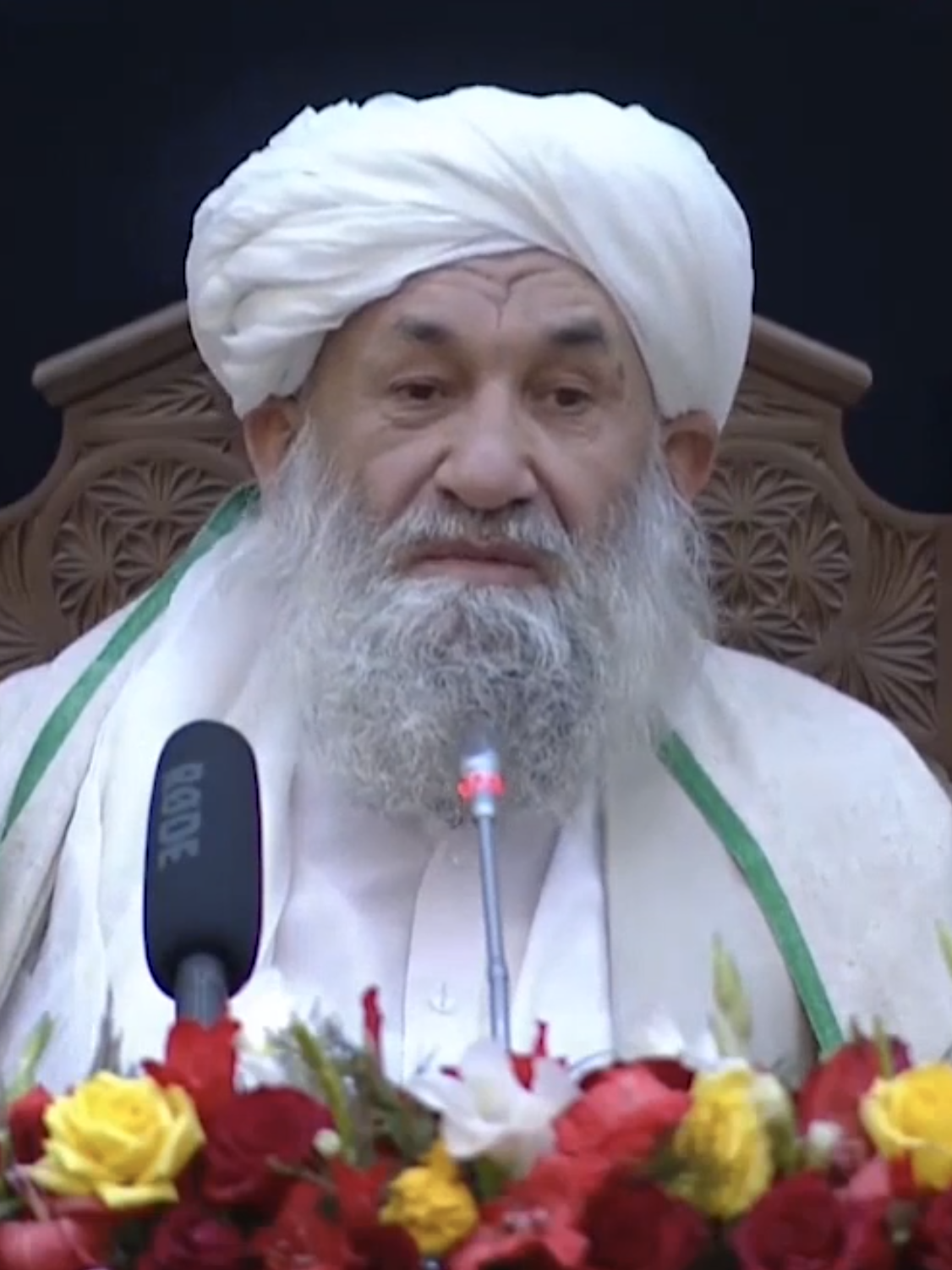
- Incumbent; Hasan Akhund since 7 September 2021 (Note: Hasan Akhund served in acting capacity until 15 August 2025. Deputy Abdul Kabir carried out the duties of acting prime minister from 17 May 2023 to 17 July 2023 while Akhund was recovering from an illness.)
- Government of Afghanistan
- Type: Head of government
- Member of: Cabinet; Leadership Council
- Reports to: Leadership
- Seat: Kabul
- Appointer: Supreme Leader
- Term length: At the pleasure of the supreme leader
- Constituting instrument: 1998 dastur
- Formation: 25 October 1927 (original); 7 September 2021 (current form)
- First holder: Shir Ahmad
- Succession: No (Deputy Leader succeeds Supreme Leader)
- Deputy: Deputy Prime Minister
- Salary: ؋198,250 monthly
- Website: Office of the Chief of Staff to the Prime Minister

The prime minister of Afghanistan, officially the prime minister of the Islamic Emirate of Afghanistan, (Note: Pashto: د افغانستان د افغانستان د اسلامي امارت لومړی وزیر, romanized: Də Afġānistān Islāmī Imārat lomři ozīr; Dari: رئیس الوزرای امارت اسلامی افغانستان, romanized: Raʾīs al-ozrāi Imārat-i Islāmī-yi Afghānistān) is the head of government of Afghanistan.

The position was created in 1927 as an official appointed by the king of Afghanistan. The holder served mostly as an advisor, until the end of the Kingdom of Afghanistan in 1973. During the 1980s, the position was the head of government. The post was abolished after the US invasion that ousted the Taliban regime, after which a presidential form of government was established which lasted from 2004 to 2021. After the US withdrawal and the re-establishment of the Taliban rule, the post was revived.

The prime minister and government are subject to the instruction of the supreme leader. On September 7, 2021 the Taliban officials who exercised de facto control of Afghanistan announced Islamic scholar Hasan Akhund as acting prime minister in a new interim government of the recently re-established Islamic Emirate of Afghanistan. On August 15, 2025 Akhund and other members of his cabinet were appointed on a permanent rather than acting basis.

== History ==
=== Kingdom ===
The chairman of the Council of Ministers was not the prime minister, but the king. Only during his absence was the prime minister the acting chairman of the Council.

Until 1963, King Mohammad Zahir Shah appointed his relatives as prime ministers. The king also had the power to dismiss or transfer the prime minister. From 1963 onwards, this was changed, stating that the head of the Afghan government was the prime minister, and that the government consisted of its ministers. It was the first time that the king did not play an important role in the government, leaving it to an elected authority. However, it also stated that they cannot engage in any other profession during their tenure of office.

The 1964 Constitution also granted the prime minister the power to summon the Electoral College in case of the death of the king. The prime minister only answered to the Wolesi Jirga (lower house of the Parliament) about the General Policy of the government, and individually for their prescribed duties.

=== Democratic Republic ===
In April 1978, Mohammad Daoud Khan was killed during a coup that started the Saur Revolution. The People's Democratic Party of Afghanistan (PDPA) revived the office of prime minister that year, and it remained throughout the 1980s.

The president was in charge of the appointment of the prime minister, who in turn appointed the Council of Ministers. The Council's stated purpose was to formulate and implement domestic and foreign policies, to formulate economic development plans and state budgets, and to ensure public order.

Under the 1987 Constitution, the president was required to appoint the prime minister in order to form the government. The prime minister had the power to dissolve the government. Several Afghan presidents during the Democratic Republic era were also appointed as prime minister. With the Soviet invasion of Afghanistan, the prime minister was no longer in charge of the government. The general secretary of the PDPA or the director of the KHAD exercised greater power.

Also, the 1990 Constitution established that only Afghan-born citizens are eligible to hold the office, something that was not specified in the previous documents.

=== Islamic State ===
After the collapse of Mohammad Najibullah's government, a transitional state was created. Thus, the office of prime minister once again played an important role in the history of the nation.

There was constant friction between the president and the premier during this period. The state had collapsed and there was not an effective central government from 1992 until 1996. Thus, the position became de facto ceremonial, with little power in what was left of the government.

=== Islamic Emirate ===
The title was abolished when the Taliban forces of the Islamic Emirate of Afghanistan took over control in 1996. The deputy leader of the Taliban was often known as the prime minister throughout its rule. With the death of Mohammad Rabbani in 2001, the Taliban decided not to revive the office.

Until September 1997, the government which the Taliban had ousted, which remained in rebellion until the end of the Taliban rule in 2001, had a prime minister in the government, but the position was abolished.

On September 7, 2021, the Taliban reinstated the position of prime minister with the formation of a new interim government.

== List of prime ministers ==
(Dates in italics indicate de facto continuation of office)

Name	Portrait	Lifespan	Term of office			Political affiliation
Name	Portrait	Lifespan	Took office	Left office	Time in office	Political affiliation
Kingdom of Afghanistan (1926–1973)
Shir Ahmad		c. 1885–?	25 October 1927	January 1929	1 year, 2 months	Independent
Shir Ahmad		c. 1885–?	Prime Minister; Deposed.			
Shir Giyan		died 1929	January 1929	1 November 1929	10 months	Saqqawist
Shir Giyan		died 1929	Prime Minister of the Emirate of Afghanistan (1929); Deposed.			
Mohammad Hashim Khan		1884–1953	1 November 1929	9 May 1946	16 years, 189 days	Independent
Mohammad Hashim Khan		1884–1953	Prime Minister; Member of the Barakzai dynasty.			
Amanat Lewana		Unknown	c. 1944	c. 1946	c. 2 years	Unknown
Amanat Lewana		Unknown	Prime Minister under king Salemai; Eastern Province only during the 1944–47 tribal revolts.			
Shah Mahmud Khan		1890–1959	9 May 1946	7 September 1953	7 years, 121 days	Independent
Shah Mahmud Khan		1890–1959	Prime Minister; Member of the Barakzai dynasty.			
Mohammad Daoud Khan		1909–1978	7 September 1953	10 March 1963	9 years, 184 days	Independent
Mohammad Daoud Khan		1909–1978	Prime Minister; Member of the Barakzai dynasty.			
Mohammad Yusuf		1917–1998	10 March 1963	2 November 1965	2 years, 237 days	Independent
Mohammad Yusuf		1917–1998	Prime Minister.			
Mohammad Hashim Maiwandwal		1919–1973	2 November 1965	11 October 1967	1 year, 343 days	Independent (until 1966)
Mohammad Hashim Maiwandwal		1919–1973	2 November 1965	11 October 1967	1 year, 343 days	Progressive Democratic Party
Mohammad Hashim Maiwandwal		1919–1973	Prime Minister.			
Abdullah Yaqta		1914–2003	11 October 1967	1 November 1967	21 days	Independent
Abdullah Yaqta		1914–2003	Acting Prime Minister.			
Mohammad Nur Ahmad Etemadi		1921–1979	1 November 1967	9 June 1971	3 years, 220 days	Independent
Mohammad Nur Ahmad Etemadi		1921–1979	Prime Minister.			
Abdul Zahir		1910–1982	9 June 1971	12 November 1972	1 year, 156 days	Independent
Abdul Zahir		1910–1982	Prime Minister.			
Mohammad Musa Shafiq		1932–1979	12 November 1972	17 July 1973	247 days	Independent
Mohammad Musa Shafiq		1932–1979	Prime Minister; Deposed during the 1973 coup d'état.			
Post abolished (17 July 1973 – 1 May 1978)
Democratic Republic of Afghanistan (1978–1992)
Nur Muhammad Taraki		1917–1979	1 May 1978	27 March 1979	330 days	People's Democratic Party (Khalq faction)
Nur Muhammad Taraki		1917–1979	Chairman of the Council of Ministers.			
Hafizullah Amin		1929–1979	27 March 1979	27 December 1979	275 days	People's Democratic Party (Khalq faction)
Hafizullah Amin		1929–1979	Chairman of the Council of Ministers; Assassinated by Soviet special forces during the Operation Storm-333.			
Babrak Karmal		1929–1996	27 December 1979	11 June 1981	1 year, 166 days	People's Democratic Party (Parcham faction)
Babrak Karmal		1929–1996	Chairman of the Council of Ministers.			
Sultan Ali Keshtmand		1935–2026	11 June 1981	26 May 1988	6 years, 350 days	People's Democratic Party (Parcham faction)
Sultan Ali Keshtmand		1935–2026	Chairman of the Council of Ministers; First tenure.			
Mohammad Hasan Sharq		born 1925	26 May 1988	21 February 1989	271 days	Independent
Mohammad Hasan Sharq		born 1925	Chairman of the Council of Ministers; Appointed as part of the National Reconciliation process.			
Sultan Ali Keshtmand		1935–2026	21 February 1989	8 May 1990	1 year, 76 days	People's Democratic Party (Parcham faction)
Sultan Ali Keshtmand		1935–2026	Chairman of the Council of Ministers; Second tenure.			
Fazal Haq Khaliqyar		1934–2004	8 May 1990	15 April 1992	1 year, 343 days	People's Democratic Party (Parcham faction) (until June 1990)
Fazal Haq Khaliqyar		1934–2004	8 May 1990	15 April 1992	1 year, 343 days	Homeland Party
Fazal Haq Khaliqyar		1934–2004	Chairman of the Council of Ministers; Resigned.			
Islamic State of Afghanistan (1992–2002)
Abdul Sabur Farid Kohistani		1952–2007	6 July 1992	15 August 1992	40 days	Hezb-e Islami Gulbuddin
Abdul Sabur Farid Kohistani		1952–2007	Prime Minister.			
Post vacant (15 August 1992 – 17 June 1993)
Gulbuddin Hekmatyar		born 1947	17 June 1993	28 June 1994	1 year, 11 days	Hezb-e Islami Gulbuddin
Gulbuddin Hekmatyar		born 1947	Prime Minister; First tenure.			
Arsala Rahmani Daulat		1937–2012	28 June 1994	1995	≈ 1 year	Ittehad-e Islami
Arsala Rahmani Daulat		1937–2012	Acting Prime Minister.			
Ahmad Shah Ahmadzai		1944–2021	1995	26 June 1996	≈ 1 year	Ittehad-e Islami
Ahmad Shah Ahmadzai		1944–2021	Acting Prime Minister.			
Gulbuddin Hekmatyar		born 1947	26 June 1996	11 August 1997	1 year, 46 days	Hezb-e Islami Gulbuddin
Gulbuddin Hekmatyar		born 1947	Prime Minister; Second tenure; Fled Kabul following its fall to the Taliban on 27 September 1996; Continued to serve as Prime Minister in areas controlled by the Northern Alliance during the 1996–2001 Civil War; Between 1996 and 2001, the Islamic State remained the internationally recognized government, despite only controlling about 10% of Afghan territory.			
Abdul Rahim Ghafoorzai		1947–1997	11 August 1997	21 August 1997	10 days	Independent
Abdul Rahim Ghafoorzai		1947–1997	Prime Minister; Served only in areas controlled by the Northern Alliance due to the 1996–2001 Civil War; Between 1996 and 2001, the Islamic State remained the internationally recognized government, despite only controlling about 10% of Afghan territory; Killed in an aircraft crash.			
Islamic Emirate of Afghanistan (1996–2001)
Mullah; Mohammad Rabbani		1955–2001	27 September 1996	13 April 2001	4 years, 198 days	Taliban
Mullah; Mohammad Rabbani		1955–2001	Deputy Head of the Supreme Council; Prime Minister; Deputy leader of the Taliban; Died in office; Between 1996 and 2001, the Islamic Emirate never attained widespread international recognition, despite controlling about 90% of Afghan territory. (Note: Between 1996 and 2001, only three UN member states—Pakistan, Saudi Arabia, and the United Arab Emirates (UAE)—recognized the Islamic Emirate as the rightful government of Afghanistan.)			
Mawlawi; Abdul Kabir		born 1958	16 April 2001	13 November 2001	211 days	Taliban
Mawlawi; Abdul Kabir		born 1958	Acting Deputy Head of the Supreme Council; Acting Prime Minister; Deposed following the fall of Kabul.			
Post abolished (13 November 2001 – 7 September 2021)
Islamic Emirate of Afghanistan (2021–present)
Mullah; Hasan Akhund		between 1945 and 1958	7 September 2021	Incumbent	5 years, 0 days	Taliban
Mullah; Hasan Akhund		between 1945 and 1958	Prime Minister; Served in acting capacity until 15 August 2025; The Islamic Emirate currently has limited international recognition, despite controlling all Afghan territory. (Note: As of 2026, only one UN member state—Russia—recognized the Islamic Emirate as the rightful government of Afghanistan.) Hasan Akhund spent 17 May to 17 July 2023 in Kandahar recovering from an illness, during which his deputy Abdul Kabir carried out the duties of the prime minister.			
Mawlawi; Abdul Kabir		born 1958	17 May 2023	17 July 2023	61 days	Taliban
Mawlawi; Abdul Kabir		born 1958	Acting Prime Minister pro tempore while Hasan Akhund was recovering from an illness.			

== Timeline ==
This is a graphical timeline of the heads of government of Afghanistan. They are listed in order of first assuming office.

The following chart lists heads of government by lifespan (living heads of government on the green line), with the years outside of their tenure in beige. Heads of government with an unknown birth date or death date are shown with only their tenure or their earlier or later life.

The following chart shows heads of government by their age (living heads of government in green), with the years of their tenure in blue. Heads of government with an unknown birth or death date are excluded. The vertical black line at 35 years indicates the minimum age to be chairman of the Council of Ministers during the existence of the Democratic Republic of Afghanistan.

== See also ==
- Supreme Leader of Afghanistan
- President of Afghanistan
- List of heads of state of Afghanistan
- Chief Executive (Afghanistan)
- Deputy Prime Minister of Afghanistan
