= Mohammad Hashim Khan =

Afghan Prime Minister

Mohammad Hashim Khan محمد هاشم خان
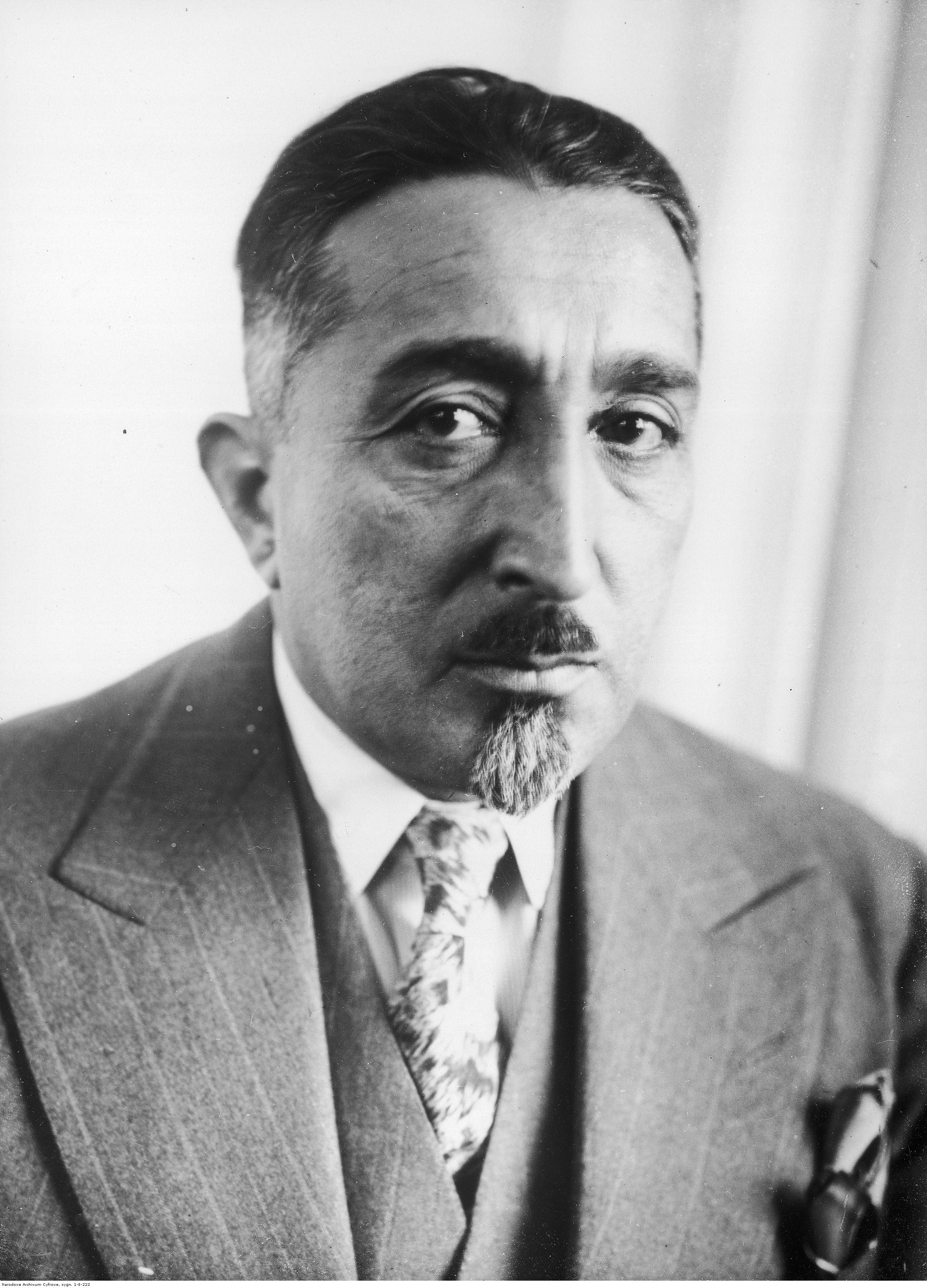

Prime Minister of Afghanistan
- In office 9 November 1929 – 9 May 1946
- Monarchs: Mohammad Nadir Shah (9 November 1929 – 8 November 1933); Mohammad Zahir Shah (8 November 1933 – 9 May 1946)
- Preceded by: Shir Giyan
- Succeeded by: Shah Mahmud Khan

Personal details
- Born: 1884 Dehradun, British India
- Died: 26 October 1953 (aged 68–69) Kabul, Kingdom of Afghanistan
- De facto ruler of the Kingdom of Afghanistan (1933–1946): ← (First in role); Shah Mahmud Khan →

Sardar Mohammad Hashim Khan (Pashto: محمد هاشم خان) (1884 – 26 October 1953) was a political figure in Afghanistan.

== Life and career ==
Mohammad Hashim Khan was born in 1884 in Dehradun, British India. He was the younger brother of King Mohammad Nadir Shah, and the elder brother of Sardar Shah Mahmud Khan and Sardar Shah Wali Khan. Hashim put into effect the policies already orchestrated by his brothers. Internal objectives of the new Afghan government focused on strengthening the army and shoring up the economy, including transport and communications. Both goals required foreign assistance. Preferring not to rely on the Soviet Union or Britain, Hashim turned to Nazi Germany. By 1935, German experts and businessmen had set up factories and hydroelectric projects at the invitation of the Afghan government. Smaller amounts of aid were also offered by Imperial Japan and Fascist Italy. He served as Afghanistan's Prime Minister from 8 November 1933 to 9 May 1946. During the reign of his nephew Mohammad Zahir Shah, Mohammad Hashim Khan, who was prime minister, was the de facto ruler of Afghanistan. Mohammad Hashim Khan was succeeded as prime minister and as de facto ruler by Shah Mahmud Khan.

During the war years, he faced significant opposition as a result of his stance on the ongoing political question of whether to yield to the British or resist them. The decision to expel Axis colonies from Afghanistan was particularly unpopular, and by October 1941 the Italian Minister in Kabul was reporting to the Foreign Affairs Office in Rome that Hashim would 'have his work cut out to save not only appearances but his life itself'.
