= Abdur Rahman Mahmudi =

Afghan physician and politician (1909 – 1960s)

Abdur Rahman Mahmudi (Dari: عبدالرحمن محمودی, 1909 – early 1960s) was an Afghan medical doctor and politician. Despite having grown up in poverty, he obtained a medical degree and became a prominent social activist. Mahmudi represented a Kabul constituency in the Afghan parliament 1949–1951. Ibrahimi (2012) described him as 'a well-known intellectual and leading figure of constitutional and reformist movement of 1940s and 1950s'. He was jailed in 1952, and died shortly after being released in the early 1960s.

== Childhood and youth ==
Mahmudi was born in 1909 in the Shahri Baraneh slum of Kabul. He hailed from a Hazara from Jaghori (Ghazni province). His father Mahmud Khan had been a landowner but had been exiled to Kashmir by Amir Abdur Rahman Khan. During the reign of Amir Habibullah Khan the family was welcomed back to Afghanistan and settled in Kabul. Mahmud Khan began running a bookstore in Kabul. Abdur Rahman's father Mirza Muhammad Khan worked at the Ministry of Finance.

Abdur Rahman received teaching from his grandfather. At the age of seven Abdur Rahmam began studying at Hemmat school, a madrasa in Tanur Sazi. When Hakim Mohammad Ibrahim opened a Yunani medicine school, Abdur Rahman enrolled there. After three years this Yunani medicine school closed down, after which Abdur Rahman enrolled at the Rushdia School. During his Rushdia School years, Abdur Rahman's mother died. The family endured economic hardship, as Mirza Muhammad Khan was a low-ranking employee suffering from chronic illness. Mirza Muhammad Khan married off his son, in order to pass over the care of his younger children to his new daughter-in-law. Abdur Rahman would go on to study medicine, but at same time he had to take odd jobs to feed his impoverished family (carrying ice blocks to market in the summer and selling charcoal in the winter).

== Medicine and social activism ==
In 1938 Mahmudi became one of the first graduates of the Medical Faculty of Kabul University. He would become known for having a simple lifestyle and providing free medical services to the poor. Around 1941–1942 he went to work as a physician at the hospital in Herat. Around 1943–1944 he was named director of the Mental Health Clinic in Kabul, whilst simultaneously working for the health insurance service of textile and sugar companies.

In 1947 Mahmudi joined the Wesh Zalmian (Awakening of Youth) movement, having been actively recruited by the predominately Pashtun group for being a prominent non-Pashtun intellectual. A text authored by Mahmudi was included in an anthology of the articles of Wesh Zalmian members, in which Mahmudi called for equal rights for all ethnic groups.

In 1948 municipal elections were held, the first modern multi-candidate elections in Afghanistan. Mahmudi stood as a candidate in for a seat in the Kabul City Council. He visited mosques and cinemas seeking votes, and emerged as a popular leader. His rising popularity worried the government. After a campaign speech between movies at a cinema, Mahmudi was arrested.

== Parliamentarian ==
Mahmudi contested a Kabul seat in the 1949 Afghan parliamentary election, and was elected with some 14,000 votes (one of the highest number of any candidate country-wide). Along with four other Wesh Zalmian deputies, Mahmudi formed the National Front parliamentary faction (a name borrowed from the Iranian National Front). Mahmudi and his (predominately Shia) followers later broke with the Wesh Zalmian movement due to its pro-government inclination.

Mahmudi was the most radical personality in Afghan national politics at the time, but 'still within the boundaries of democratic reform'. In 1951 Mahmudi founded a political party, the Hezb-e Khalq ('People's Party'). He was the publisher of the party organ Neda-ye Khalq ('Call of the People'). Per Ibrahimi (2012) 'by most accounts' Mahmudi was not a communist, but that the Hezb-e Khalq program had left-wing elements. The twenty-four article document committed to an Islamic constitutional monarchy and democratic principles. The party program spoke of elimination of oppression. It mentioned that the right to establish political parties and that there should be free elections. It called for struggle against social injustice and argued in favour for equality of all citizens. The core of the party membership consisted of people from the Kabul University Students Union.

He supported strikes by coal miners, textile workers and employees of the Abdul Majid Zabuli trading sherkats in Kandahar and Qataghan.

Mahmudi published the Hezb-e Khalq on the front page of Neda-ye Khalq. The state authorities confiscated the entire edition of the newspaper. Although Hezb-e Khalq was never legalized, the government banned the party and Neda-ye Khalq after its 29th issue. On 1 July 1951 Mahmudi survived an assassination attempt.

== Imprisonment, death, and legacy ==
Mahmudi stood for re-election in the 1952 Afghan parliamentary election. Before the election Mahmudi was arrested along with 16 of his followers. The official result declared Mahmudi and Ghulam Muhammad Ghobar as defeated in their two respective Kabul constituencies. The opposition, including the Kabul University Students Union, protested against the alleged election rigging and demanded that the result of those two constituencies be annulled. Among those arrested in the protests against the arrest of Mahmudi was Babrak Karmal.

Mahmudi would spend years at Deh Mazang prison without trial. Mahmudi was suffering from kidney disease, having previously had one kidney removed in an operation in Turkey before his imprisonment. He was beaten in prison, causing his health conditions to further deteriorate. In his cell, Mahmudi would write poems using onion juice as ink. He was released for health reasons in the early 1960s, and died shortly thereafter.

Mahmudi's brother Dr. Rahim Mahmudi and his nephew Dr. Hadi Mahmudi would become prominent leaders of the Maoist Shola-e Jawid movement in Afghanistan. Their kinship with Abdur Rahman Mahmudi gave the Mahmudi duo political prestige, and the Shola-e Jawid movement would claim to uphold the legacy of the struggles of Abdur Rahman Mahmudi.
