= Mohammad Ibraheem Khwakhuzhi =

Ustad Mohammad Ibraheem Khwakhuzhi استاد محمد ابراهیم خواخوږی
- Born: February 28, 1920; Kandahar, Afghanistan
- Died: October 24, 1992 (aged 72); Kabul, Afghanistan
- Resting place: Shuhada-e-Saliheen
- Occupations: Poet, Writer, Journalist, Teacher, Public Servant
- Political party: Wish Zalmiyan
- Children: 2 sons & 2 daughters
- Website: http://www.ikhwakhuzhiworld.com

Ustad Mohammad Ibraheem Khwakhuzhi (Pashto: استاد محمد ابراهيم خواخوږى) son of Dur Mohammad Khan Baloch (descendant of Khan of Kalat Mir Muhammad Nasir Khan I) was born on 28 February 1920 in Malajat district of Kandahar province, Afghanistan.
His son Gharzai Khwakhuzhi is an active politician in Afghan government and his grandson Gharanai Khwakhuzhi is an Afghan Foreign Service Officer at Ministry of Foreign Affairs of Islamic Republic of Afghanistan.

== Early life ==
Ibraheem Khwakhuzhi started his primary schooling at age 6 and after his baccalaureate in 1936 attended Teachers Training College, finishing it successfully in 1938.
In 1942 he managed to get a diploma in Education and Literature followed by a degree in Journalism in 1962.
After graduation, he started his teaching career as principle of Ahmad Shah Baba High School in Kandahar and later on as the teacher of literature at Habibia High School. His first poem was published in 1934 (at the age of 14) in Tolo-e-Afghan newspaper.

== Political life ==
Mohammad Ibraheem Khwakhuzhi started his political career with the establishment of Weesh Zalmyan (Awakened Youth) movement in 1947 where he was amongst the founding members of the movement from Kandahar province. Mr. Zarmalwal mentions him in one of his articles which states;

The following people were amongst the founding members of the movement: From Kandahar and Farah: Pohand Abdul Hai Habibi, Ustad Abdul Rauf Benawa, Late. Faiz Mohammad Angar, Late. Mohammad Rasul Khan Pashtoon, Pohand Abdul Shakoor Rashad, Ustad Mohammad Ibraheem Khwakhuzhi and Late. Abdul Razaq Farahi. From Nangarhar: Ustad Gul Pacha Ulfat, Ustad Qyam-ud-Dean Khadim, Pohand Siddique ullah Reshtein and Late. Ghulam Hassan Khan Safi. From Ghazni: Late. Nur Muhammad Taraki. From Pakiya: Neek Mohammad Pakityanai and Ghulam Mai-ud-Dean Zarmalwal who was known as Ghulam Mai-ud-Dean Roshan.

In 1950 Weesh Zalmyan movement came under a crackdown of the government for its liberal and modernized demands and Mohammad Ibraheem Khwakhuzhi who was then director of Education in Kandahar Province, became the first member of the movement to be arrested. Ghulam Gelani Khan writes about this in a topic in Mohammad Alam Buserkai's book called “Weesh Zalmyan” where he states;

"In 1950 the Afghanistan’s Weesh Zalmyan Movement was at its best in the Kandahar Province and was progressing well.
As one of our active member late. Mohammad Ibraheem Khwakhuzhi the director of Education in Kandahar Province was arrested by the Kandahar’s governor Mohammad Younus Khan; he was the first member of our Movement to be arrested by the Government."

Later in mid 60s he joined the Progressive Democratic Party of Afghanistan under the leadership of Late. Mohammad Hashim Maiwandwal.

== Public service ==
After Khwakhuzhi was released he was forced to leave Kandahar province, therefore, he settled in Kabul and started his public service career in the Government of Afghanistan.
His performed his service for the government in the following order:
In 1956, he was assigned as a skilled member of Pashto Academy
In 1957, as the Head of Broadcast Monitoring of Radio Afghanistan
In 1959, as the deputy director of Radio Afghanistan
In 1960, as the deputy director of Afghan Theater (Pohane Nandare) as well as teacher of History in Naderia High School
In 1961, he was selected as a member of Afghan-China Friendship Association
In 1963, he was assigned as the Director General of Literature at the Ministry of Publications (then)
In 1966, as the Director General of the Book Publication in the Ministry of Culture
In 1967, as the President of Public Libraries of Afghanistan
In 1969, he was selected as a member of the Afghan National Committee for UNESCO
In 1971, as the Director General of Virtue of Pashtu Language at the Academy of Sciences
In 1973, he was invited by Shah Faisal to visit Saudi Arabia and during his visit he also completed a pilgrimage (Hajj) to Mecca.
In the same year after the regime change and Daoud Khan coming to power, Khwakhuzhi was required to retire from public service.

== After retirement and death ==
After his retirement, Khwakhuzhi returned to reciting poems writing, and teaching, including teaching Tafsir of Quran at Qala-e-Fatehullah mosque, Kabul.
On 24 October 1992, due to long-standing diabetes and cardiovascular disease, he died in Kabul and was buried in Shuhada-e-Saliheen, Kabul.

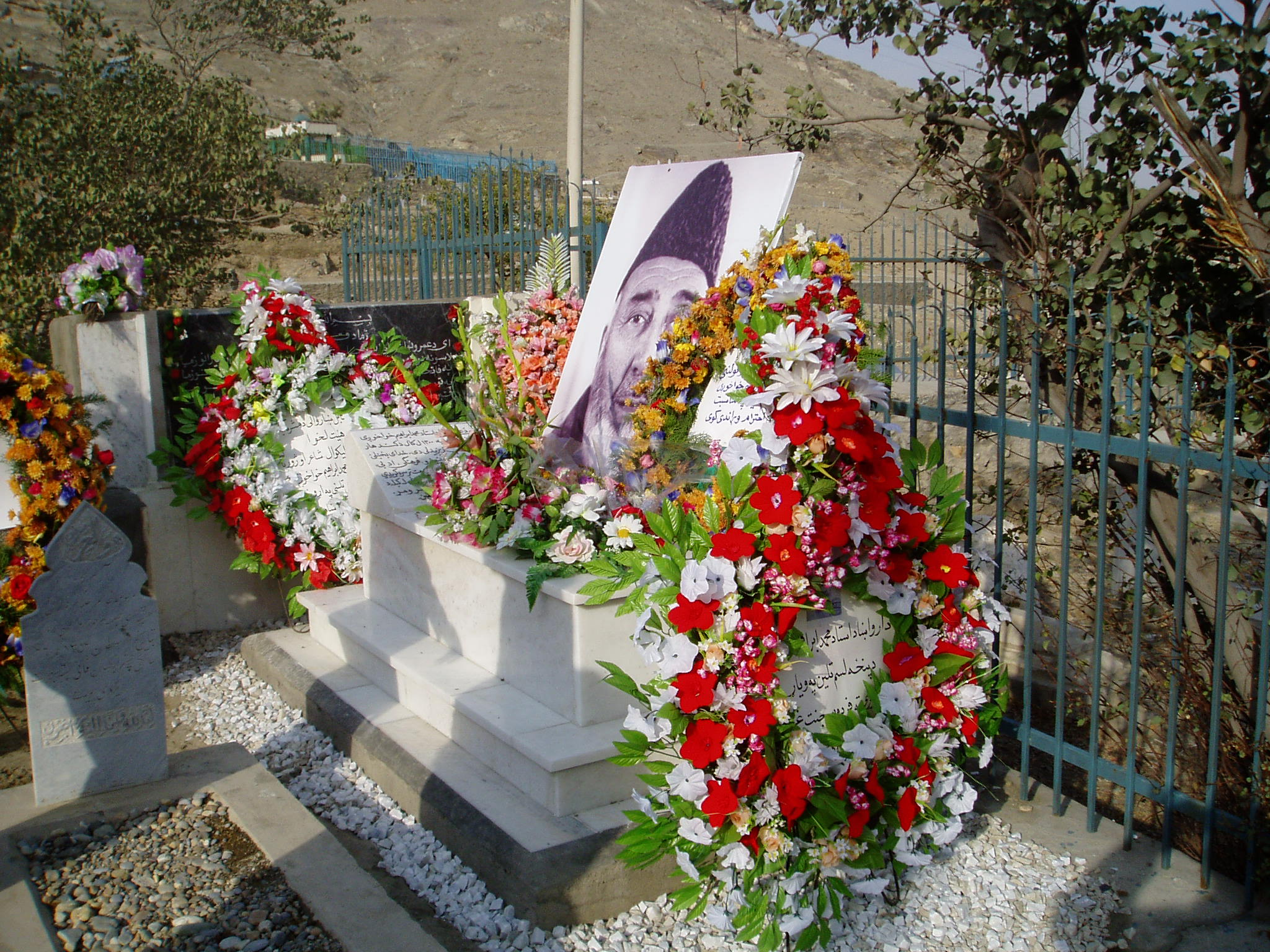
Mohammad Ibraheem Khwakhuzhi's tomb during the 15th Death Anniversary of his - 2007

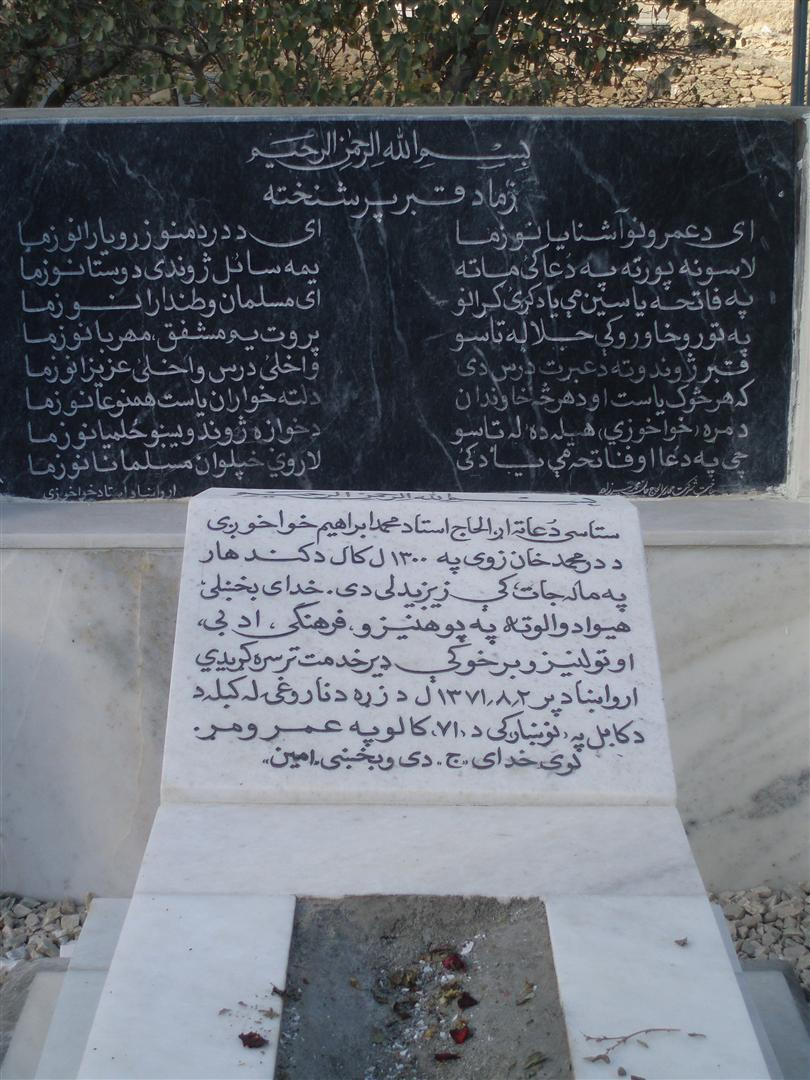
Mohammad Ibraheem Khwakhuzhi's tombstone with his poem (as per his well) on it - 2009

== Accolades ==
During his life Mohammad Ibraheem Khwakhuzhi was rewarded by the Government of Afghanistan for his service with the following honors:

- First position award in Pashtu Literation (1946)
- Second grade medal of Da Meenapal Nishan from His Excellency King Mohammed Zahir Shah (1965)
- First grade medal of Da Meenapal Nishan from His Excellency King Mohammed Zahir Shah (1969)
- Best Cultural Activist Award (Pohanpal) (1972)

== Literary works ==
He left behind nine books consisting of poems, stories and philosophy.

1. Da Meenae Wazhma (Collection of poems)
2. Aikayat Na Dai Aqiqat Dai (It is not a story but the Truth)
3. Yawa Zharawonki Manzara (A tearful scene)
4. Marghalara Aow Noor Khan (The story of Marghalara & Noor Khan)
5. Sheen Khali Aow Ghulalai (The story of Sheen Khali & Ghulalai)
6. Dwa Zwane Marg Mayenan (Two young lovers)
7. Da Gustave Le Bon Landi Khabari (Sayings of Gustave Le Bon)
8. Da Meenae Wazhma 2 (Collection of poems Part 2)
9. Da Meenae Wazhma 3 (Collection of poems Part 3)

=== Translated works ===
He also translated the works of other authors.

1. Thoughts of Yesterday and Tomorrow - Gustavo Lobon
