= 1945 in Afghanistan =

- Decades: 1920s; 1930s; 1940s; 1950s; 1960s
- See also: Other events of 1945; List of years in Afghanistan

The following lists events that happened during 1945 in Afghanistan. The year saw the continuation of the Afghan tribal revolts of 1944–1947.

== Incumbents ==
- Monarch – Mohammed Zahir Shah
- Prime Minister – Mohammad Hashim Khan

== Events ==
=== January ===
- 6 January – Five Hawker Hind aircraft leave Kabul for Jalalabad; they will carry out reconnaissance once every two weeks and return in April.

=== February ===
- 9 February – Ely Palmer, formerly with the foreign service at the Australian embassy, succeeds Cornelius Van H. Engert as U.S. minister at Kabul.
- February to March: Hashim Khan negotiates with Eastern tribal leaders in Jalalabad, easing tensions through diplomacy and bribes. Safi and Shinwari remain defiant, protesting grain seizures and conscription, and prepare for renewed rebellion.

=== March ===
- Food scarcity, exacerbated by smuggling and profiteering, leads to riots in Herat, leading to the assassination of local director of food supplies and two of his assistants.

=== Spring ===
- In southern Afghanistan, battles beak out between the Afghan army and forces of the Wazirs and Mahsuds, who declared their goal to be the restoration of Amanullah Khan to the Afghan throne.
  - This rebel offensive is eventually contained with reinforcements and aerial power.
- The Amanullah loyalists launch an intense propaganda campaign within the Afghan army, urging officers and soldiers to defect and not serve a government that had "sold itself to the British."

=== April ===
- 6 April – A Hind aircraft makes a forced landing at Mazar-i-Sharif.
- 8 April – All Hind aircraft that had departed Kabul for Jalalabad on 6 January, save for the one that crash-landed on the 6th, return to Kabul.
- 15 April – One Hind aircraft flies to Matun for reconnaissance, returning on the 17th.
- 18 April – One Hind aircraft flies to Matun for reconnaissance, returning the same day.

=== May ===
- 2 May – the Soviet Union conquers Berlin. Among the people captured is prominent Amanullah loyalist Ghulam Siddiq Khan, who had been lobbying for German support for Amanullah's restoration since 1941; he is sent to Moscow.
- 8 May – Germany surrenders. Germany's defeat had been anticipated by Afghan government elites, but comes as a shock to the Afghan public, who know Germany as a beneficial trading partner that won impressive victories early in the war.

=== June ===
- An uprising erupts in the Eastern Province as Safi, Shinwari, Khugiani, and Mohmand tribes rebel under Sultan Muhammad, demanding an end to forced grain procurement. The Afghan government rejects talks and appoints Mohammad Daoud Khan to crush the revolt.
- 23 June – the last serviceable Breda Ba.28 aircraft (Italian) crash-lands in Kabul and is written off as a complete loss, leaving the Afghan aircraft with 12 serviceable Hawker Hind aircraft (British), 6 Romeo aircraft (Italian) and one Stearman aircraft (American) by 31 October.
- 24 June – 4 Hind aircraft are dispatched to Jalalabad to deal with the Safi and Mohmad uprising.
- 24 June to 31 October – the Afghan air force regularly partakes in bombing, machine gunning and reconnaissance against the rebels. The number of aircraft in Jalalabad during this period varies from 4 to 10

=== July ===
- The Red Crescent Society of Afghanistan donates £5,000 to the fund opened by the International Red Cross at Geneva as a token of its sympathy with the fate of European peoples.
- 1 July – Daoud arrives in Jalalabad and develops a plan for a major offensive.
  - Several brigades work to cut off the Safis and allied tribes from the Southern province and eliminate the main strongholds in the Kunar valley through coordinated strikes.
- 2 July – An additional 4 Hind aircraft are sent to Jalalabad to reinforce the offensive.
- 6 July – Daoud's offensive concludes as rebels retreat into the hills.
  - Afterwards, Daoud offers amnestry. The near-defeated rebels agree, but Daoud reneges on his promises, arresting 450 tribal leaders.
- 16 July – After being reinforced by tribes from British India, the Safi launch a counteroffensive in which loyalist forces suffer 4,000 casualties.
  - Around this time, the rebels receive blessings from the clergy.
  - The counteroffensive leads to the rebels capturing Kunar, Asmar, Chaghasarai, and all surrounding settlements to the north. The offensive threatens to capture Jalalabad.
  - The government dispatches 6 infantry brigades, and Daoud executes officers who retreat. These measures stabilise the situation near Jalalabad.

=== August ===
- 9 August to 7 September – Ramadan leads to a temporary reduction of military operations.
- 26 August – Muhammad Ishan Khan, commander of the Afghan air force, dies of illness; his illness and death contribute to a decline in aviation training between the end of July and the end of October
- 30 August – Asdullah Khan, inspector general of the army, is named as Muhammad Ishan Khan's replacement, despite his lack of aviation experience. He proves himself more reliant on British instructors than his predecessor.

=== September ===
- 8 September – the Siege of Kunar Khas, which began late in August, is broken by an offensive led by Daoud Khan. Gerald Crichton, HM Charge de 'affairs at Kabul, considers this the turning point of the tribal revolts as most rebels surrendered by the end of October.
- 13 September – Britain sends 10,000 rifles, 5,000 submachine guns, 900,000 rounds of ammunition, 25 artillery pieces and 15,000 artillery shells to Afghanistan to assist the war against the rebels.

=== October ===
- 3 October – One Hind aircraft flies to Matun for reconnaissance, returning the same day.
- 7 October – One Hind aircraft flies to Matun for reconnaissance, returning the same day.
- 9 October – One Hind aircraft flies to Matun for reconnaissance, returning the next day.
- 13 October – Three Hind aircraft flies to Matun for reconnaissance, two returning the same day and one returning on the 15th.
- End of October – by this time, most of the rebels have come to terms with the Afghan government. The peace agreement includes the abandonment or postponement of Safi conscription, end of forced grain requisitions, and full amnesty to all rebels. A minority of Safi, as well as Mazrak Zadran, reject the peace agreement and continue the insurgency.

=== November ===
- 1945 Hazara Rebellion: Due to a new tax imposed only on Hazaras, Muhammad Ibrahim Khan launches a Hazara revolt in Shahristan. After a siege lasting for about a week, the district, as well as arms and ammunition, fall into the hands of the rebels, who maintain control until 1946.
- Early November – aerial operations against the Safis and Mohmands in the Kunar valley come to an end, though 4 Hawker Hind aircraft are retained in Jalalabad for the duration of winter as a precaution.

=== December ===
- The Afghan government requests the supply of 6 Avro Anson XIX transport aircraft in April 1946, but the manufacturers can not promise delivery before February to April 1947.

== Births and deaths ==
=== Births ===
- Muhammad Akbari
- Sayyid Abdulillah (d. 1978)
- Abdul Rahim Wardak
- 28 February – Zahir Howaida (d. 2012)
- 24 July – Ghulam Dastagir
- 11 November – Sher Mohammad Karimi
