= 1946 in Afghanistan =

- Decades: 1920s; 1930s; 1940s; 1950s; 1960s
- See also: Other events of 1946; List of years in Afghanistan

The following lists events that happened during 1946 in Afghanistan. The Afghan tribal revolts had receded by this time as most rebels had surrendered in October 1945, though pockets of resistance continued the insurgency. In June, Afghanistan applied for United Nations membership; the request was granted and the nation took its seat in November.

== Incumbents ==
- Monarch – Mohammed Zahir Shah
- Prime Minister – Mohammad Hashim Khan (until 9 May), Shah Mahmud Khan (starting 9 May)

== Events ==
- The women's movement in Afghanistan is resumed by the foundation of Women's Welfare Association, the first women's organisation in Afghanistan since the Anjuman-i Himayat-i-Niswan.

=== January ===
- One Hawker Hind aircraft crash-lands on the Jalalabad airfield, and is damaged beyond repair.

=== February ===
- 1 February – Gerald Crichton, British Charge de 'affairs at Kabul, reports on the situation in Afghanistan.
  - "Every effort is being made to reduce prices and to secure a wider and cheaper distribution of the main commodities, particularly of cotton piece-goods, petrol and kerosene oil. These two factors, high prices and shortages of commodoities, more than anything else, are responsible for the internal discontent which makes such a dangerous accompaniment to tribal trouble, and it is to be hoped that the Government of India will respond as generously as possible to Afghan appeals for more liberal export quotas of such things as piece-goods and petrol."
  - "There are still some Safi extremists actively hostile to the Government, keeping the embers of revolt alive in the Kunar and these are not without sympathisers among the neighbouring tribes."

=== March ===
- 16 March – the commander of the Afghan Air Force, Asadullah Khan, returns to Kabul after a 2 month leave for British India to obtain medical treatment for his family.

=== Spring ===
- The 1945 Hazara Rebellion ends. There are multiple accounts as to how the rebellion ended.
  - According to Encyclopædia Iranica, the Afghan government sends a force to pacify the region and subsequently withdrew the tax that caused the initial uprising.
  - According to Niamatullah Ibrahimi, the rebellion ends in spring 1946, when Mohammed Zahir Shah sends a delegation to the rebels, offering to lift the tax if the rebels lay down their arms, which is accepted.

=== April ===
- Early April – 7 Tiger Moth aircraft arrive in Kabul, having flown from Peshawar after their purchase by the Afghan government. An eighth Moth, which had also been purchased, crash-lands shortly after takeoff and needs to be repaired before it can be delivered.
- 30 April –One Hawker Hind aircraft crash-lands on the Sherpur airfield while practicing the dropping of messages, and is damaged beyond repair. The two crewmen do not sustain injuries in the accident.

=== May ===
- 9 May – Sardar Shah Mahmud succeeds Sardar Mohammad Hashim as prime minister. The Afghan Minister of the Royal Court attributed Hashim's policies to the earlier eruption of the tribal revolts, saying: "With his dictatorial regime, Hashim Khan has alienated the entire Afghan population, especially the nomadic Pashtun tribes, who almost annually rise against the government with weapons in hand."

=== June ===
- 5 June – Afghanistan applies for membership in the United Nations. This is approved on 29 August, and Afghanistan is formally admitted as a member by the Assembly on 19 November.
- 13 June – An agreement is signed in Moscow by Vyacheslav Molotov and Sultan Ahmad Khan, Afghan ambassador, clarifying nuances of the 1921 border agreement and ownership of islands across the Oxus.

=== July ===
- A pilot of a Romeo aircraft swerves during formation take off, leading the aircraft to turn over on its back and catching fire. The pilot was uninjured, but the aircraft had to be written off due to damage.
- 20 July – King Zahir Shah holds a speech at the opening of the sixth session of the National Council, discussing, among other things, Afghan foreign policy. While the section regarding the Soviet Union did not have anything objectionable to the Soviet ambassador, it was noted to be less cordial than the sections about Britain and America.
- 25 July – Giles Squire, British envoy to Kabul, reports: "In the Southern Province the efforts of Mazrak and Sultan Ahmad to stir up trouble has been ineffective, largely because the tribesmen of Waziristan have been occupied with local affairs and because the Faqir of Ipi, in order to concentrate the greatest possible strength in opposition to the Government of India, has deprecated any diversion of forces against Afghanistan."

=== August ===
- A Tiger Moth aircraft flies from Peshawar to Kabul, bringing the Afghan government's stock of this aircraft type up to 8.

=== September ===
- Abdur Razaq Khan, commander of the Sherpur airfield, leaves to attend an October conference on civil aviation in Cairo.

=== October ===
- By this time, a shortage of wheat flour had emerged in Kabul. An Afghan official writes an op-ed criticising the government's economic policies and gets it published; censors let it slip into publication in an unusual (or accidental) step. The economic minister, Abdul Majid, responds by blaming British India for delivering inadequate supplies.
- 3 October – King Zahir Shah embarks on a 2 month tour around the country.
  - "The Afghan government are themselves aware of the unpopularity of their rule and it was largely for this reason that His Majesty made a prolonged tour, the first since his accession, in the north to see things for himself and to show that his government are not uninterested in the prosperity of their northern subjects."
- 15 October – Zahir Shah celebrates his 35th birthday at Dahana-i-Farang.

=== November ===
- Sultan Ahmad, Mazrak Zadran's principal colleague, surrendered and is returned to Balochistan in custody. Around this time, it is reported that Mazrak is tired of the "unequal struggle" and only undecided whom he should to surrender to.
- 20 November – an outbreak of cholera leads to one death in Gardez. To contain the outbreak, the government takes steps to limit the movement of troops and civilians between Kabul and the southern province.
- 23 November – Mohammed Dauod Khan gives the remaining Safi peace terms, which includes the return of rifles and small arms ammunition captured from government troops, the surrender of Shahswar, Said Muhd, Salim Khan and Allahdadd Khan, the sale of grain to the government at reasonable rates, and the despatch of Safi youths to Kabul for education. The Safi accept the terms that same month.

=== December ===
- 6 Hawker Hind aircraft are dispatched from Kabul to Jalalabad for reconnoisance; they will return in March 1947.
- 20 December – By this time, the cholera outbreak in the southern province has subsided.
- 23 December – Two Hind aircraft escorting the prime minister to Ghazni collide in mid-air at Shashgao and crash; 4 pilots die but the prime minister survives.
