= 1950 in Afghanistan =

- Decades: 1930s; 1940s; 1950s; 1960s; 1970s
- See also: Other events of 1950; List of years in Afghanistan

The following lists events that happened during 1950 in Afghanistan.

== Incumbents ==
- Monarch – Mohammed Zahir Shah
- Prime Minister – Shah Mahmud Khan

== January 4, 1950 ==
The year begins auspiciously by the signature at New Delhi, India, of a treaty of friendship with India. The treaty provided that each signatory should be able to establish trade agencies in the other's territory. The treaty would last for five years in the first instance, and at the end of that period it would be terminable at six months' notice. This friendship with India does not find reflection in Afghanistan's relations with Pakistan. Pakistan feels that Afghanistan is too tolerant of the so-called independent Pashtunistan movement, which has for its aim the creation of a Pashto-speaking enclave and therefore a new state to be carved out of Pakistan territory. Afghanistan develops closer relations during the year with Egypt, Saudi Arabia, and Iran.

== July 1950 ==
On 17 July 1950, the USSR and Afghanistan signed a 4-year Trade Agreement providing for duty-free transit of Afghan goods through Soviet territory.

== September 1950 ==
Disturbances are caused by an apparent invasion of Pakistan near the Bogra pass. The Afghan government promptly denies that the invaders have comprised Afghan troops. The prime minister of Pakistan, Liaquat Ali Khan, in disclosing that a protest has been sent to Kabul on what he describes as the culminating incident in a number of minor frontier violations, declares that Pakistan is willing to discuss economic and cultural questions of common concern to the two countries. He nevertheless deprecates any action which might disturb the peace of the strategic frontier area.
