= 1952 in Afghanistan =

- Decades: 1930s; 1940s; 1950s; 1960s; 1970s
- See also: Other events of 1952; List of years in Afghanistan

The following lists events that happened during 1952 in Afghanistan.

== Incumbents ==
- Monarch – Mohammed Zahir Shah
- Prime Minister – Shah Mahmud Khan

== January 6, 1952 ==
Shah Wali Khan, Afghan ambassador to the United Kingdom, says in an interview with The Hindu that the area of Pakhtunistan includes the states of Chitral, Dir, Swat, Bajaur, Tirah, Waziristan, and Baluchistan. "The right of 8,000,000 Pakhtuns to enjoy freedom cannot be ignored," he adds.

== January 1952 ==
A bill to nationalize oil is passed by the seventh National Assembly and a UN technical assistance mission under Philip Beck (U.S.) is invited to Afghanistan. Shortly after its arrival the mission visits the Shibarghan area in the northwest, about 72 km from the Soviet border, where rich oil deposits have been discovered. On August 21 Izvestiya publishes a report that this mission is a tool of the U.S. imperialists, who are planning the construction of military roads and airfields near the Soviet border. Later Andrey Vyshinsky, the Soviet foreign minister, sends a strong note to Kabul protesting against the mission's presence in Afghanistan. The Kabul government refutes this note in September, explaining that, as Afghanistan's economic life depends on motor transport, all oil prospecting is in the country's vital interests.

== February 1952 ==
A royal proclamation is issued calling upon the people to elect the eighth National Assembly (171 seats) within three months. As no census of population has ever been taken there are no electoral lists, and elections consist in calling public meetings which vote for the official candidates by acclamation. In Kabul, where the election takes place on April 20, there are two opposition candidates, but the government candidates are said to be elected by considerable majorities; however, out of about 50,000 entitled to vote only 7,000 actually voted.

== October 1952 ==
King Zahir at the opening of the new National Assembly reiterates the country's desire to maintain close and friendly relations with all nations. He deplores the fact, however, that relations with Pakistan have not improved. "We have," he says, "the most friendly feelings for Pakistan, but we cannot forget the cause of Pakhtunistan."

== December 1952 ==
The Helmand Valley Authority was created on December 4, 1952.
