= 1953 in Afghanistan =

- Decades: 1930s; 1940s; 1950s; 1960s; 1970s
- See also: Other events of 1953; List of years in Afghanistan

The following lists events that happened during 1953 in Afghanistan.

The Kabul government sends a strongly worded note of protest to Karachi over the bombing of the tribal villages in the Afridi area, pointing out that such bombing breaks the Anglo-Afghan agreement under which both parties promised to consult the other before taking any punitive measures against the border people.

== Incumbents ==
- Monarch – Mohammed Zahir Shah
- Prime Minister – Shah Mahmud Khan (until 7 September), Mohammed Daoud Khan (starting 7 September)

== 1953 ==
The government appropriates 120,000,000 Afghanis for oil exploitation and 8,000,000 Afghanis for improvement of existing transport facilities. The Helmand valley irrigation projects are coordinated under a specially appointed development board. This board will have under its control the two large irrigation and hydroelectric power dams of Arghandab and Kajakai as well as the Nahr-i-Boghra 154-km-long canal. The two major dams will irrigate 650,000 ac of formerly arid land, and the new power stations will have a generating capacity of more than 200,000 kW. These projects have cost the country more than $60,000,000 since their inception in 1946. In addition to these projects, the Sarobi hydroelectric power plant about 65 km downstream from Kabul enters its third and last phase; it will have a generating capacity of 24,000 kW. The main use of the power will be to run the Gul-Bahar textile mill of 1,800 looms, which will substantially increase the cloth production that by 1953 stands at 10,000,000 m per year from the four existing mills. Coal production was increased by one-third during 1952–53 to 14,500 tons yearly. Plans in hand call for the opening of new collieries which will treble the 1953 output. Deposits of talc, mica, silver, lead, beryl, chromite, copper, lapis lazuli, and iron ore have been mapped and are to be worked.

== September 1953 ==
The elderly and ailing Sardar Shah Mahmud Khan, the king's uncle, prime minister since May 1946, resigns and is succeeded by Lieut. Gen. Sardar Mohammad Daud Khan, a younger member of the ruling family.

== November 26, 1953 ==
A new Afghan ambassador, Ghulam Yahia Khan Tarzi, arrives in Moscow. On December 24, a protocol is signed at Kabul concerning trade between the U.S.S.R. and Afghanistan for 1954, according to which deliveries by both sides are to be increased. Soviet diplomacy has decided to support Afghanistan against Pakistan by fanning the Afghans' fear that their neighbour will grow stronger because of U.S. military assistance.
