= 1951 in Afghanistan =

- Decades: 1930s; 1940s; 1950s; 1960s; 1970s
- See also: Other events of 1951; List of years in Afghanistan

The following lists events that happened during 1951 in Afghanistan.

As in the previous year, relations between Afghanistan and Pakistan are not happy, because of charges and countercharges regarding border incidents and, on the Pakistan side, particularly because of the alleged encouragement by Afghanistan of the Pashtunistan movement.

== Incumbents ==
- Monarch – Mohammed Zahir Shah
- Prime Minister – Shah Mahmud Khan

== January 1951 ==
A visit of the Afghan prime minister, Shah Mahmud Khan, to New Delhi gives an indication of the cordial relationship maintained with India. Shah Mahmud is entertained by the government of India and a tribute to Indo-Afghan relations is paid by Chhakravarthi Rajagopalachari, Indian home minister.

== February 1951 ==
Under the Point Four program, an agreement with the United States is signed in Kabul to assist the Afghan government in the economic development of the country.

== September 5, 1951 ==
The Afghan prime minister, who is paying yet another visit to Delhi, is invited to address members of the Indian parliament, and he reaffirms his hope that the close and sincere relations already existing between Afghanistan and India will remain for the benefit of world peace. At a press conference Shah Mahmud Khan stresses the friendliness of Afghan policy toward Pakistan, and maintains that in supporting the "Pashtunistan" movement Afghanistan is not animated by hostility to Pakistan.

== October 16, 1951 ==
Liaquat Ali Khan, prime minister of Pakistan, is assassinated, calling forth from Kabul a sympathetic message and a tribute to his ability. The Pakistan government on its side is careful to stress the point that, although the assassin is stated to be of Afghan origin, there is no sinister significance in that fact, especially as he has been an exile in Pakistan for some time.
