= Muhammad Ibrahim Khan (Hazara leader) =

Leader of the Hazara people in Afghanistan

Ibrahim Gaosawar ابراهیم گاوسوار
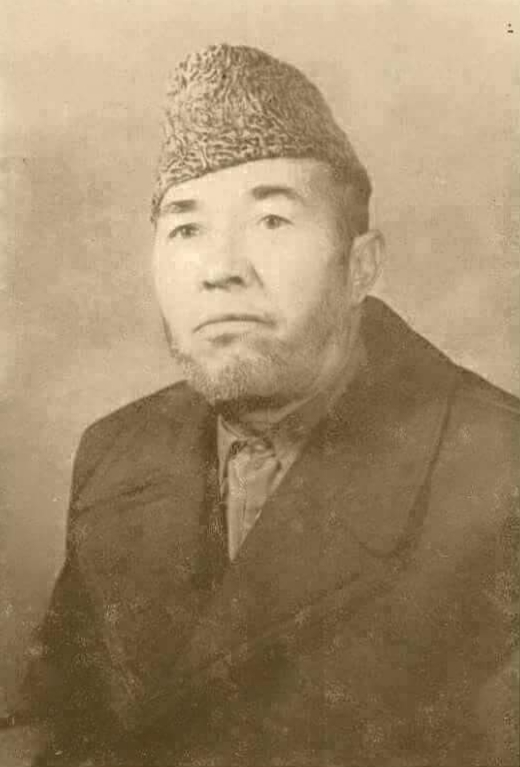
- Ibrahim Gaosawar c.1944
- Born: Muhammad Ibrahim; 1915; Sharistan, Uruzgan (now Daikundi), Emirate of Afghanistan
- Died: 1982 (aged 66–67); Puli Khumri, Baghlan, Democratic Republic of Afghanistan
- Other names: Ibrahim Beig, Ibrahim Khan, and Ibrahim Sharistani

Muhammad Ibrahim Khan (Dari: محمد ابراهیم خان), known as Ibrahim Gaosawar (ابراهیم گاوسوار; 1915 – 1982), was the leader of the armed uprising of the Hazara people of Afghanistan in protest against taxes during Zahir Shah's rule.

== Life and story ==
Ibrahim Gaosawar was born in 1915 in Sharistan, Uruzgan province (now Daikundi province) in Afghanistan. His father "Muhammad Musa Khan" and his grandfather "Amir Dad" were the beigs and the elders of local people. Amirdad, was called Gaosawar (گاوسوار); (bull rider) because he was riding a "saddled bull"; And Ibrahim Khan was called the son of Gaosawar or Ibrahim Gaosawar.

=== Uprising ===
Ibrahim Gaosawar was the leader of the armed uprising against Zahir Shah's rule, protesting the heavy taxes imposed on the Hazaras. When the decree of Chancellor Mohammad Hashim Khan was issued to collect oil tax was issued on a per capita basis from all animals and dairy cattle in Hazara regions, this government action made life difficult and unbearable for the people of this region because the people did not have the power to pay the tax and a large part of Hazaras were forced to immigrate and flee within or to neighboring countries. To end this excruciating situation, Ibrahim Gaosawar, with the support and participation of the people, revolted against Zahir Shah's government and forced the government to retreat. In 1944 Ibrahim Gaosawar, with a group of peasants and local people, started an armed uprising and presented their request to cancel the oil tax on Hazaras to the ruler of Panjab after many struggles. The ruler of Panjab transferred their request to the central government and after long negotiations, finally in 1946, oil tax was removed from Hazara people. And this uprising was called his peasant uprising. Ibrahim Gaosawar then went to Kabul along with some other influential and elders of the Hazara people to meet with the government officials, but at the request of the government, he stayed in Kabul so that the ground for anti-government uprisings would be taken away from him. When the scope of the uprising spread, Zahir Shah removed Mohammad Hashim Khan from the position of chancellor and appointed Shah Mahmud Khan instead. One of the consequences of Ibrahim Gaosawar's uprising was the removal of Mohammad Hashim Khan from his position. Ibrahim Gaosawar in the "Ittihad party", along with Ismael Balkhi and some other members of the Ittihad party's central council, had an armed approach, and in Nowruz 1950, they made a plan to assassinate the new chancellor Shah Mahmoud Khan and change the state of the government. Ibrahim Gaosawar was supposed to be responsible for the shooting. but this plan was revealed before its implementation and the leadership circle of the Ittihad party were all arrested and remained in Dehmzang prison in Kabul without trial until 1964.

=== End of life ===
After his release from Dehmzang prison, Ibrahim Gaosawar lived in Puli Khumri, Baghlan province, because when he was imprisoned with the Ittihad party members, his family and some of his relatives were exiled to Pul Khumri, by Zahir Shah's government. Ibrahim Gaosawar lived under the care of the government until the end of his life. Finally, he died on the 5 December, 1982, in Pul Khumri.

== See also ==
- 1945 Hazara Rebellion
- List of Hazara people
