= Ghulam Hassan Safi =

Afghan politician (1902–1984)

Ghulam Hassan Safi (1902–1984) (Safi alternative spelling for Safay, Sapi, Saapai etc.) was a prominent Afghan politician and diplomat. He was one of the founding members of Afghan political movement Weesh Zalmyan (Awakened Youth). Other founding members of the movement were Qazi Bahram, Abdul Hadi Tokhay, Mohammad Rasul Pashtun, Fayz Mohammad Angar, Gul Pacha Ulfat, Qiamuddin Khadem, Ghulam Mohayuddin Zurmulwal, Abdur Raof Benawa, Nur Mohammad Taraki, and others.

He was born in Omarzai district of Laghman, a province in eastern Afghanistan. Ghulam Hassan Safi is father of Afghan politician and law professor Dr. Wadir Safi.

Ghulam Hassan Safi played a major role in the history and the political arena of Afghanistan during the 1950s and 1960s.
