= Awakened Youth =

Awakened Youth may refer to:

- Weekh Zalmian, an Afghan political movement active from 1947 to 1952
- Angkatan Pemuda Insaf (API), Malay youth division of Parti Kebangsaan Melayu Malaya (PKMM)
