= 1949 in Afghanistan =

- Decades: 1920s; 1930s; 1940s; 1950s; 1960s
- See also: Other events of 1949; List of years in Afghanistan

The following lists events that happened during 1949 in Afghanistan.

The cold war between Afghanistan and Pakistan continues. Political circles in Kabul and the Afghan government insist that Pakistan should constitute the North-West Frontier Province as an independent Pashtun republic, or at least allow the Pashtuns of the tribal areas on the Pakistan side of the Durand Line to opt for Kabul. The British government categorically refuses the Afghan request that it should intervene. The press and wireless of Kabul continue to pour out propaganda against Pakistan. The Pakistan government refrains from reprisals and trade between the two countries goes on as before; in fact economic cooperation is offered. Afghanistan is in the grip of an economic crisis. The Persian lamb trade, a vital element in Afghan finance, is languishing; Indian import duties paralyze the export of fruit.

== Incumbents ==
- Monarch – Mohammed Zahir Shah
- Prime Minister – Shah Mahmud Khan

== June 1949 ==
The Afghan parliament cancels all treaties which former Afghan governments have signed with the British, including the Durand Line Agreement, and thus proclaims that the Afghan government does not recognize the Durand Line as a legal boundary between Afghanistan and Pakistan.

== November 24, 1949 ==
The Export-Import Bank of Washington grants Afghanistan a $21,000,000 loan on the strength of which important work on roads, bridges, and irrigation dams, which a U.S. firm had been carrying out for two or three years but which was held up because of dwindling Afghan credit, is to be resumed.
