= Asmai =

Asmai may refer to:

- Al-Asma'i (c. 740 – 828), Arab scholar, philologist and anthologist at the court of Haroun al-Rashid
- Asmai Heights in Afghanistan
