= 1948 in Afghanistan =

- Decades: 1920s; 1930s; 1940s; 1950s; 1960s
- See also: Other events of 1948; List of years in Afghanistan

The following lists events that happened during 1948 in Afghanistan.

Relations between Afghanistan and Pakistan are peaceful and formally correct. The unsettled relations between Pakistan and India, however, interfere with the Afghan foreign trade which for decades had gone mostly by the Khyber Pass. Another reason for the unfavourable balance of trade is the falling price of Karakul lambskins, the most valuable of the country's exports. Three new motor roads were under construction in 1948: Kabul to Mazar, Kabul to Khyber Pass, and the Badakhshan road from Kabul toward Sinkiang province, China.

== Incumbents ==
- Monarch – Mohammed Zahir Shah
- Prime Minister – Shah Mahmud Khan

== March 29, 1948 ==
It is announced that the British legation at Kabul and the Afghan legation in London are to be raised to the status of embassies. On June 5 a similar step is taken between the US and Afghanistan.
