= Abdul Shakoor Rashad =

Afghan scholar (1921–2004)

Abdul Shakoor Rashad عبدالشکور رشاد
- Born: November 14, 1921; Kandahar, Afghanistan
- Died: December 1, 2004 (aged 83); Kabul, Afghanistan
- Occupations: Professor, historian; researcher; linguist; writer; poet
- Years active: 1934–1978
- Employer: Kabul University
- Organization: Pashto Academy

Abdul Shakoor Rashad (Pashto: عبدالشکور رشاد; 14 November 1921 – 1 December 2004) was an Afghan professor, researcher, linguist, and writer. He is known for his work in Pashto language and literature, for which he has written several books. Prior to his academic career, Rashad served as a local politician in Kandahar.

== Early life ==
Rashad was born in Kandahar, Afghanistan. In 1933 he graduated from school at the age of 12. In 1934, the 13-year-old Rashad became a teacher and began his official career.

In 1948, Abdul Shakoor went to India to further his education and to continue his research in Pashto. While there, he wrote a 351-page book titled Lodi Pashtoons and learned Hindi.

== Academic life ==
In 1957, Rashad became a member of the Pashto Academy and a professor of the Pashto language at the Faculty of Language and Literature at Kabul University. He was later appointed as Assistant Director of the Pashto Academy.

In 1961, he was appointed as a Pashto-language teacher in the Institute of Eastern Research in Leningrad, where he served for two and a half years. He moved back to Kabul where he continued to serve as a professor at Kabul University in the Faculty of Language and Literature as Professor and as the Chief of the Pashto Department.

Besides his native language Pashto, he was fluent in Persian, Tajik, Arabic, Urdu, Hindi, Russian, and English. He was also knowledgeable in Sanskrit, Hebrew, Bengali, Brahui, Balochi, Hazaragi, Ossetian, Kurdish, Pashayi, Nuristani, the Pamir languages, Latin, Greek, Ukrainian, Polish, Serbo-Croatian, French, German, Italian, Spanish, Japanese, Korean, Chinese, Mongolian, Uzbek, Turkmen, and Turkish. He wrote poems in Persian and Urdu, and has devoted his life in Pashto literature. He has written around 105 books (of which 36 were published) and hundreds of articles.

== Political life ==
In 1946, Abdul Shakoor was appointed as the Director of Kandahar City Selection Committee and in 1947 he became the Deputy Mayor of Kandahar City.

At the age of 26, Abdul Shakoor joined the "Weesh Zalmian" (ويښ زلميان), an Afghan youth movement. In 1952, he was elected as a representative of Weesh Zalmian to the parliament. But due to the opposition of Governor Abdul Ghani Khan and the officials of that time, his vote box was confiscated by the police from the election bureau. In this movement the high-profile leaders, writers, activists such as Hasham Maiwandwal (Prime Minister of Afghanistan), Abdul Rauf Benawa, Sadiqullah Reshteen, Faiz Mohammad Angar, Khwakhuzhi Sahib, Abdul Hye Habibi, Noor Mohammad Angar, Bari Jahani, Habibullah Rafi, Gul Pacha Ulfat, Basarki Sahab and others were associated with him.

Abdul Shakoor remained in Afghanistan during the Russian invasion of Afghanistan (1979–1989) and the Civil War in Afghanistan followed by the withdrawal of the Russian forces form Afghanistan. He wrote several poems and articles critical of the communist regimes during the Soviet occupation and the warlords during the civil war. For security reasons, most of his works were published by alias names.

Abdul Shakoor Rashad retired after the communist coup in 1978. However, he always kept a close academic relation with the institutions and other academics.

He died on 1 December 2004, at the age of 83 in Kabul, Afghanistan. He was buried by the Kandahar University campus.

== Books ==
Some of his notable publications include:

- Hazrat Abu Bakr Siddiq – on the life and eminence of first Muslim Caliph Abu Bakr
- Pəx̌tāna šuwarā: bašpaṛ matn – a collective biography of Pushto poets from ancient times to 20th century from Afghanistan and Pakistan; includes samples from their works
- Də Kandahār yādāx̌tuna –historical and cultural study of Kandahar from ancient times to 20th century
- Də Dawlat Lawāṇay diwān – a Pashto poem
- Lodi Pəx̌tāna, political history of Lodi dynasty of Afghanistan; includes biographical sketches of noted personalities of the tribe
- Milli atal Ǧāzi Wazir Muhammad Akbar Khan – on the life of Wazir Akbar Khan, a national hero of Afghanistan
- Də Pəx̌to pakhwānay Alafbe – history of the Pashto alphabet
- Luǧawi seṛana – analysis of Pashto lexicon
- Makhārij al-hurūf – annotation and commentary on a work of Arabic phonology by Avicenna
