= Pork in Pakistan =

The sale and consumption of pork is mostly illegal in Pakistan, a Muslim-majority country where halal dietary guidelines are observed. Being 98.1853% Muslim majority makes pork hard to find. Like alcohol however, the meat may be consumed by non-Muslim citizens and foreigners who reside in the country.

== Background ==
In Urdu and other regional languages, a pig is referred to as a suwar or khinzeer. Due to pork being outlawed, foreign airlines which fly to Pakistan, such as British Airways, follow these requirements by excluding pork-containing items from their meals.

== Boar distribution ==
The Margalla Hills surrounding the capital city of Islamabad are home to a significantly large population of Eurasian wild boars. These pigs can weigh up to 100 kg and have sharp teeth, while the male adults typically also have upward curving tusks. The thickly-vegetated plains and ravines of Margalla Hills National Park provide a favourable living environment for the pigs, and their population is estimated to number 800,000, an exponential increase from 100,000 when the effort to build the new national capital started. Known for their aggressive behaviour, they are considered a pest in the city, where they often overrun landfill sites in search of food and attack local residents. They are also known to have intruded into properties and caused traffic accidents. In addition to waste material, they feed on grass, roots and organic matter. In rural locations, they are regarded as a top agricultural pest, causing damage worth millions to crops. The Capital Development Authority (CDA) in Islamabad has sought to cull their population through various pest control measures, including by poisoning, laying traps, and granting boar hunting licences. Despite this, their distribution has not been affected significantly over the years due to high reproductive growth.

The wild hogs are also found elsewhere in the country, particularly near sugar plantations and to some extent the irrigated farms of maize, wheat, barley, rice, sorghum, potato, and millet crops, which are prone to damage when used by the pigs as a sanctuary. They are prevalent in the wildlife preserves of Changa Manga and Piranwala in Punjab, as well as in the national park areas of Murree and Azad Kashmir, the wider Potohar region, and in forestland or riparian areas next to the Indus River basin, with some numbers in Sindh. They are not common in the more arid and mountainous regions of the country's north and west, and are a rarity in the Peshawar and Kohat locations of Khyber Pakhtunkhwa. As a result of dislocation from their natural habitats due to climate change, urbanisation and food competition with other species, some boars have migrated upward into the Galyat region which includes the Ayubia National Park and adjoining areas. In Balochistan, the boars are found in a smaller concentration on agricultural fields, riverbanks and forests in the Nasirabad, Sibi, Kachhi, Lasbela, and Jafarabad districts.

== Hunting ==
It is posited that one of the reasons for the boar's large population is the lack of a real predator, and because it does not have consumptive use for the vast majority of Pakistanis out of cultural and religious beliefs. The wild boar is not a protected species, and as such used to be hunted freely in Pakistan, by both locals and foreigners (some of whom came for trophy hunting). During the 1980s, wild hogs were targeted extensively for pest control. In Punjab, farmers were given a payment of USD$1 for each pig hunted and the program was estimated to have culled up to 20,000 boars annually. The military also culled nearly 10,000 boars in a single elimination exercise. The program was abandoned later due to lack of funds. The poaching of wild creatures such as boars was once considered a "time-honoured sport" (shikar) for men, who would locate and hunt the animals for days along the bordering regions with India, often straying close to the boundary unintentionally. Once making their kill, they would either hand over the boar to their Christian servants who ate pork, or sold the meat to butchers in India.

In 2006, the CDA enacted a program to cull wild boars using poisoning techniques. In the 2010s, a ban was imposed on hunting in Islamabad due to security issues relating to carrying weapons, which led to another population increase. The CDA stopped the wide distribution of hunting permits in this regard.

== Import and consumption ==
Pork products are imported into Pakistan to serve the culinary needs of the country's growing Chinese community. Unlike the Pakistani version of Chinese cuisine, which relies on chicken or beef gravies made with ingredients such as garlic, tomatoes and ginger, authentic Chinese cuisine is described to be much different with heavy use of pork ingredients in dishes.

== Export ==
The export of swine meat from Pakistan is legal under a statutory regulatory order provided by the Ministry of Commerce. In the 2015–16 financial year, Pakistan exported $2.8 million worth of swine meat, and an additional $447,000 in the 2016–17 financial year based on State Bank of Pakistan data. The vast majority of these exports were delivered to Afghanistan, to serve the dietary requirements of NATO personnel stationed there. According to the Daily Times, it remained unclear if these exports comprised wild boar meat or commercially raised pork, the latter being preferred in the food industry, leading to speculations of undisclosed pig farming in the country. The All Pakistan Meat Exporters and Processors Association (APME&PA) categorically denied the involvement of any of its members in this sector.

== See also ==
- Animal husbandry in Pakistan
- Cattle slaughter in India
- Khanzir, Afghanistan's only pig
- Pork in Ireland
