= 1944 in Afghanistan =

- Decades: 1920s; 1930s; 1940s; 1950s; 1960s
- See also: Other events of 1944; List of years in Afghanistan

The following lists events that happened during 1944 in Afghanistan. The year saw the beginning of the Afghan tribal revolts of 1944–1947.

== Incumbents ==
- Monarch – Mohammad Zahir Shah
- Prime Minister – Mohammad Hashim Khan

== Events ==
=== January ===
- Gen. Patrick J. Hurley visits Kabul as U.S. President Franklin D. Roosevelt's personal representative.
- Afghanistan negotiates the sale of 10,000 tons of wool to the Soviet Union.
- 28 January – Giles Squire, British envoy to Afghanistan, reports on the situation in Afghanistan.
  - "The Prime Minister's health is precarious and that of his brother, the Minister of Defence, is none too good. Nor are the Royal Family a happy team, and reports of differences between the Prime Minister of Defence and his nephew, Sirdar Muhammad Daud Khan, the Governor of Kandahar, are too persistent to be entirely ignored. In spite of their fourteen years of power, the present dynasty have not succeeded in acquiring the loyalty and affection of the country, though recent efforts to achieve this object, such as Muhammad Naim Khan’s tour to which I have already referred, seem to have met with some measure of success. A single bad harvest or the failure of His Majesty's Government and Government of India to ensure the punctual arrival of essential supplies might cause a serious and rapid deterioration in the economic condition leading to tribal unrest and widespread disturbances. The end of the war may well see also the end of the usual docility of the border tribes, causing trouble which may spread beyond tribal limits. We have still to maintain a careful watch against the unforeseen, but never altogether unexpected, in Afghanistan, while endeavouring to encourage any tendencies which make for stability and ordered progress."

=== February ===
- Early February – the Afghan tribal revolts of 1944–1947 begin. The exact sequence of events varies across sources:
  - According to a later Pakistani inquiry, the conflict began after the Afghan government raided Mazrak's summer homes at the Taragharai hills and his winter home at Almara, since Mazrak was suspected of housing Amanullah loyalist elements.
  - According to British records, it began shortly after the Afghan government moved troops into the southern province to reassert their authority in the area, which by then was a safe haven for smugglers.
  - Tikhonov (2007): After failed negotiations in 1943, Wazir tribesmen looted government grain depots near Urgun, and the well-armed Zadran tribe soon followed in revolt after Afghan troops tried to intercept Zadran trade of firewood in early February. General Faiz Muhammad Khan, commanding in the South, retaliated with artillery fire on Pashtun villages, forcing many Zadrans into Waziristan while soldiers looted those who remained. Such abuses provoked Zadran leader Mazrak Zadran to escalate the uprising, which gained support from neighboring Mangals, Tanais, and Safis. With nearly 10,000 fighters assembled, early battles inflicted serious government losses, prompting Kabul to send reinforcements. News of the rebellion, according to Soviet intelligence, deeply unsettled the Afghan leadership.
- 12 February – King Zahir Shah convenes with key officials: Hashim Khan (Prime Minister), Shah Mahmud Khan (Minister of war), Daoud Khan (Commander of the Central Forces), and Naim Khan (Deputy Prime Minister), to discuss the uprising. Shah Mahmud urges peaceful negotiation; Zahir Shah and Hashim Khan agree. Daoud Khan rejects concessions, demands force. He prevails: three regiments, artillery, and armored cars are ordered to Khost that night. Command formally goes to Daoud, but Shah Mahmud leads operations in practice.
  - Government offensives against the Zadran and allied tribes fuel rebel hostility and sabotage of the sudden national draft. Tribes demand an end to forced food procurement and tax cuts. The Shinwari, Safi, Khugiani, and Tani seek united action; Shah Mahmud Khan arrests their delegates, then releases them amid growing unrest. He warns Hashim Khan that military suppression is impossible, as rebel forces outnumber government troops.

=== March ===
- The Afghan ambassador and Chinese minister in Ankara conclude a lengthy negotiation with the signing of a treaty of friendship establishing diplomatic and consular relations between the two countries.
- Early March – Amidst growing insurrection, Hashim Khan orders Shah Mahmud to negotiate peace, offering major concessions—ending timber monopoly, paying market grain prices, reducing conscription, and sending funds to bribe tribal leaders.
- c. 20 March (Note: In his account of the tribal revolts, Yuri Tikhonov writes that the rebellion had been localized by spring. The March equinox, often used to denote the start of spring, occurred on 20 March this year.) – By this time, Shah Mahmud has used Kabul’s bribes (several million Afghanis), tax reductions, and promises of autonomy to localize the Eastern Province’s rebel movement.
  - The government also offers Mazrak Zadran amnesty and compensation, but he rejects it, denouncing the government as untrustworthy. Shah Mahmud orders an assault on Mount Almara; rebels, aided by the Mangals, defeat a government regiment. News spreads, drawing support from Suleiman Khel, Wazirs, Madakhel, Tani, and Daragi—rebel number reach 180,000. British bombing threats halt cross-border tribal unity. Nationwide revolt looms, with Tajiks and Hazara unrest emerging.
- End of March – The Afghan ministry of defence informs the British military attache that they would like to send 3 pilots to Britain or India for training under the RAF.

=== April ===
- Mazrak Zadran invites the Faqir of Ipi, operating on the British side of the border, to join the Afghan rebel war effort.
- Loyalist troops in the Southern Province (specifically Urgun, Gardez, and Khost) are significantly reinforced.
- Afghanistan requests the British Raj to prevent Waziri tribes from reinforcing Afghan rebels.
- Shah Mahmud Khan bribes two tribal leaders, Miru and Muhammad Sarwar, to turn 1,000 warriors against Mazrak, prompting his withdrawal to Waziristan as he is unwilling to fight fellow Zadrans. After his departure, Zadran envoys seek peace but are arrested as the government begins repressions.
- 2,000 Amanullah loyalists, led by Ghulam Muhammad Khan and by the Shinwari and Afridi, rise up, as they seek to take advantage of the tribal revolts.
- 19 April – 4 Romeo aircraft are dispatched to Khost to drop leaflets on rebel-held villages.
- 20 to 24 April – Aerial reconnaissance over Khost.
- 22 April – Mazrak is forced to retreat into the hills following an attack by the Afghan government.
- 25 April – 6 Hawker Hind aircraft are dispatched to Gardez for potential future anti-rebel operations.
- End of April – Despite their sentiment in favour of the Afghan rebels, Waziri tribes had yet to cross into Afghanistan in large numbers. Robert Gascoyne-Cecil, British Secretary of State for Dominion Affairs, attributes this to British political pressure.
- 30 April or 1 May – 600 gallons (~2700 litres) of petroleum are dispatched to Gardez in a tanker lorry to supply aerial operations.
- 30 April to 31 July: over this period, 2000 gallons (~9000 litres) of petroleum are sent from Sherpur to Gardez for aerial operations.

=== May ===
- After being defeated in several battles with the government, Ghulam Muhammad Khan joins his Amanullah loyalist forces into Mazrak Zadran's army.
- 5 May – Giles Squire reports on the situation in Afghanistan.
  - Regarding the tribal revolts, Squire writes: "though the Government intentions are moderate and their position is apparently strong, the situation is still uncertain and the possibility of serious developments cannot be ignored".
  - The Afghan government "recently" introduced an income tax, estimated to yield £2 million (Note: equivalent to £76,681,040 in 2025) over the course of the year.
  - The Afghan government is grateful for British economic assistance and looks forward to its post-war continuation.

=== June ===
- Afghan troops attempt to assassinate Mazrak during a meeting at Mount Almara but are defeated; Zadrans capture 500 rifles and three machine guns. The clergy reject Zahir Shah’s gifts and refuse to issue an anti-rebel fatwa. Shah Mahmud orders airstrikes destroying Mazrak’s fortress, but troops refuse to fight fellow Muslims. Kabul fails to crush rebels, facing potential army mutiny.
- 5 June – One Hind aircraft from Kabul is dispatched to Khost, returning the next day.
- mid-June
  - reports state that Wazirs plan to join Mazrak after the harvest; Zangi Khan (rebel Zadran) negotiates with the Mahsud
  - a Safi uprising is on the verge of breaking out.
  - Kabul offers Mazrak amnesty and to return land, but he refuses as he suspects a trap.
- 21 June – Six Hawker Hind aircraft, previously dispatched to Gardez on 25 April, return to Kabul. They had been used to drop leaflets and incendiary bombs. There had been no casualties during this operation.

=== July ===
- Giles Squire tells Soviet Ambassador Bakulin that Mazrak Zadran and the Faqir of Ipi lead parallel insurgencies in Afghanistan and British India, warning their alliance could overpower Kabul. To protect Hashim Khan’s government, NWFP governor George Cunningham convenes with Waziristan leaders in Bannu, using threats and bribes to ensure non-interference—though Wazirs still shelter Zadran families.
- 2 July – Three Hind aircraft are sent to Khost, returning to Kabul after 2 hours.
- 17 July – Nine aircraft are dispatched to Khost for reconnaissance, returning to Kabul after 2 hours.
- End of July – Muhammad Ihsan Khan, commander of the Afghan Air Force, has fallen ill by this time. The British Military Attaché, Alexander Lancaster writes: "It will be unfortunate if he is forced to retire, as he appears to be the only officer who can maintain discipline in the air force".

=== August ===
- 28 August – Two Hind aircraft are dispatched from Kabul to Khost for reconnaissance. One returns after two hours; the other makes a forced landing at Matun owing to oil leaking from badly maintained exhaust pipes.
- 29 August – Two Hind aircraft are dispatched to Khost for additional reconnaissance. The aircraft that had undertaken a forced landing the prior day is repaired, and three aircraft return to Kabul.

=== September ===
- No aerial operations take place the entire month. This is reflects a broader reduction of Afghan aviation in the third quarter of 1944 due to the desire to preserve petroleum.
- 2 September – Zahir Shah hosts a grand palace reception for Zadran tribal leaders who had been paid to swear loyalty and defect from Mazrak. The government agrees to abolish the timber monopoly, adjust taxes to market rates, and grants the Zadrans the right to form a militia—temporarily stabilising the situation, though Mazrak remains active in Waziristan.

=== October ===
- 9 October – two Hind aircraft are dispatched to Khost for reconnaissance, returning to Kabul after 2 hours.
- 21 October – two Hind aircraft are dispatched to Khost for reconnaissance, returning to Kabul after 2 hours.
- End of October
  - the Afghan ministry of defense informs British India of its intent to purchase 6 to 8 Tiger Moth aircraft.
  - Muhammad Ihsan Khan remains alive by this time, but his continued illness has impaired the effectiveness of the Afghan air force over the course of August to October.

=== November ===
- The appearance of a mysterious Malang who posed as the brother of Amanullah temporarily helped boost Mazrak's fortunes, but lack of money with which to bribe the tribes caused the failure of the movement, and Malang had disappeared into obscurity by March 1945. By this time, the situation of the Afghan government was the most critical since the Ghilzai rebellion of 1938 - their aerial capacity was limited by a shortage in bombs, their resources were stretched between the southern and eastern provinces, and the general population was discontented by high prices and a shortage of commodities.
- Muhammad Ihsan Khan departs for British India for medical treatment; he will be absent from military service until March 1945. This makes the Afghan air force even less active during the winter months than before.

=== December ===
- By December, Anglo-Afghan aerial bombardment has forced Mazrak to temporarily halt his activities in Waziristan.
- A military mission of six officers departs to British India to inspect newer forms of training and equipment, and to garner insight from the Burma campaign.
