= 1947 in Afghanistan =

- Decades: 1920s; 1930s; 1940s; 1950s; 1960s
- See also: Other events of 1947; List of years in Afghanistan

The following lists events that happened during 1947 in Afghanistan.

Because of close ties of kinship and common cultural tradition, Afghanistan is deeply concerned over the question of the right to self-determination of the Afghans of the North-West Frontier Province of India, arising from the creation of the separate independent states of India and Pakistan.

Afghanistan sends an observer-delegate to the Geneva meetings of the UN Conference on Trade and Employment.

== Incumbents ==
- Monarch – Mohammed Zahir Shah
- Prime Minister – Shah Mahmud Khan

== 30 September 1947 ==
Afghanistan is the only country to vote against the admission of Pakistan to the United Nations.
