= 1954 in Afghanistan =

- Decades: 1930s; 1940s; 1950s; 1960s; 1970s
- See also: Other events of 1954; List of years in Afghanistan

The following lists events that happened during 1954 in Afghanistan.

The Export-Import Bank of the United States lends $18,500,000 to Afghanistan to help buy the U.S. material, equipment, and services for the Helmand river valley development project.

== Incumbents ==
- Monarch – Mohammed Zahir Shah
- Prime Minister – Mohammed Daoud Khan

== January 5, 1954 ==
The Pakistani government orders the release of Abdul Ghaffar Khan, the 63-year-old leader of the Red Shirts (Khudai Khidmatgars), who had been detained at Rawalpindi since June 1948, on a charge of championing the cause of Pashtunistan, i.e., the establishment within the northwest frontiers of Pakistan of a Pashtu-speaking province united with Afghanistan. About 45 other persons detained for the same reason are set free, but Abdul Ghaffar Khan is to reside in Punjab.

== January 27, 1954 ==
An agreement is signed at Kabul by Mikhail V. Degtyar, the Soviet ambassador, and Abdul Malik, the Afghan Minister of Finance, under which the U.S.S.R. grants Afghanistan a loan of $3,500,000, at 3.5% interest, for the construction at Kabul of a grain elevator of 20,000 tons, of a flour mill with a capacity for grinding 60 tons of wheat in 24 hours, and of a mechanized bakery capable of converting 50 tons of flour into bread every 24 hours. Another grain elevator of similar capacity is to be constructed at Puli Khumri. The cost of both elevators is estimated at $8,000,000.

== February 2, 1954 ==
An Afghan cultural mission arrives in New Delhi. Its leader, Ali Ahmad Popal, Deputy Minister of Education, says that the military pact between the U.S. and Pakistan will bring war nearer to Afghan frontiers.

== Spring 1954 ==
The construction of a 100-km pipeline from Termez (Uzbek S.S.R.) to Mazar-i-Sharif is started by Soviet technicians; it will have an annual delivery capacity of 30,000,000 gal. of gasoline.

== May 1954 ==
A foreign investment law granting capital from abroad equal treatment with national capital is promulgated. It makes provision for the transfer of profits abroad after payment of income tax, for the repatriation of capital, and for the transfer abroad of up to 70% of salaries of the foreign employees.

== Summer 1954 ==
Extensive oil deposits in northern Afghanistan are further surveyed by Swiss technicians. As the oil fields are near Shibarghan, about 145 km from the Soviet frontier, the Moscow government urges the Kabul government to develop them either by an Afghan-Soviet company or with financial and technical aid derived from countries which are not members of the North Atlantic Treaty Organisation.

== October 6, 1954 ==
Another loan of $2,100,000 is granted for buying industrial equipment in the USSR.

== November 6–7, 1954 ==
Mohammad Naim Khan, the Afghan foreign minister, visits Karachi.
