= 1943 in Afghanistan =

- Decades: 1920s; 1930s; 1940s; 1950s; 1960s
- See also: Other events of 1943; List of years in Afghanistan

The following lists events that happened during 1943 in Afghanistan.

The Treaty of Saadabad with Turkey, Iran, and Iraq is automatically renewed for a further five years, as none of its signatories has denounced it six months before expiration.

== Incumbents ==
- Monarch – Mohammed Zahir Shah
- Prime Minister – Mohammad Hashim Khan

== June 1, 1943 ==
A new departure is taken by the appointment of the first Afghan minister to the U.S., Abdul Hossein Aziz, who formerly represented his country in Moscow.

== October 24, 1943 ==
It is learned that negotiations for a treaty of alliance between China and Afghanistan have been completed in Ankara.
