= Kabul Zoo =

Zoo in Kabul, Afghanistan, opened in 1967

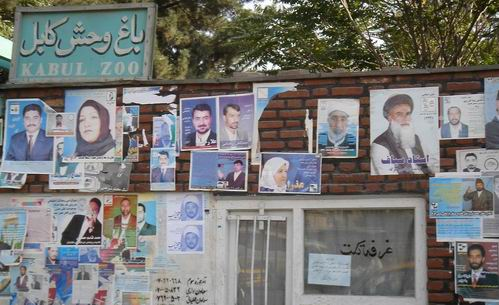
- Interactive map of Kabul Zoo
- 34°30′34″N 69°09′19″E
- Date opened: 1967
- Location: District 3, Kabul, Afghanistan

The Kabul Zoo (Dari: باغ‌وحش کابل; Pashto: د کابل باغ‌وحش) is located in Kabul, Afghanistan, on the bank of the Kabul River and adjacent to the Deh Mazang Circle. Its public entrance is on Asmayi Road across from the Kabul Traffic Police Headquarters. The City Park and Gardens of Babur are nearby. Visited by around a million people annually, the zoo has been one of the popular tourist attractions in the city. Its director is Aziz Gul Saqeb.

== History ==
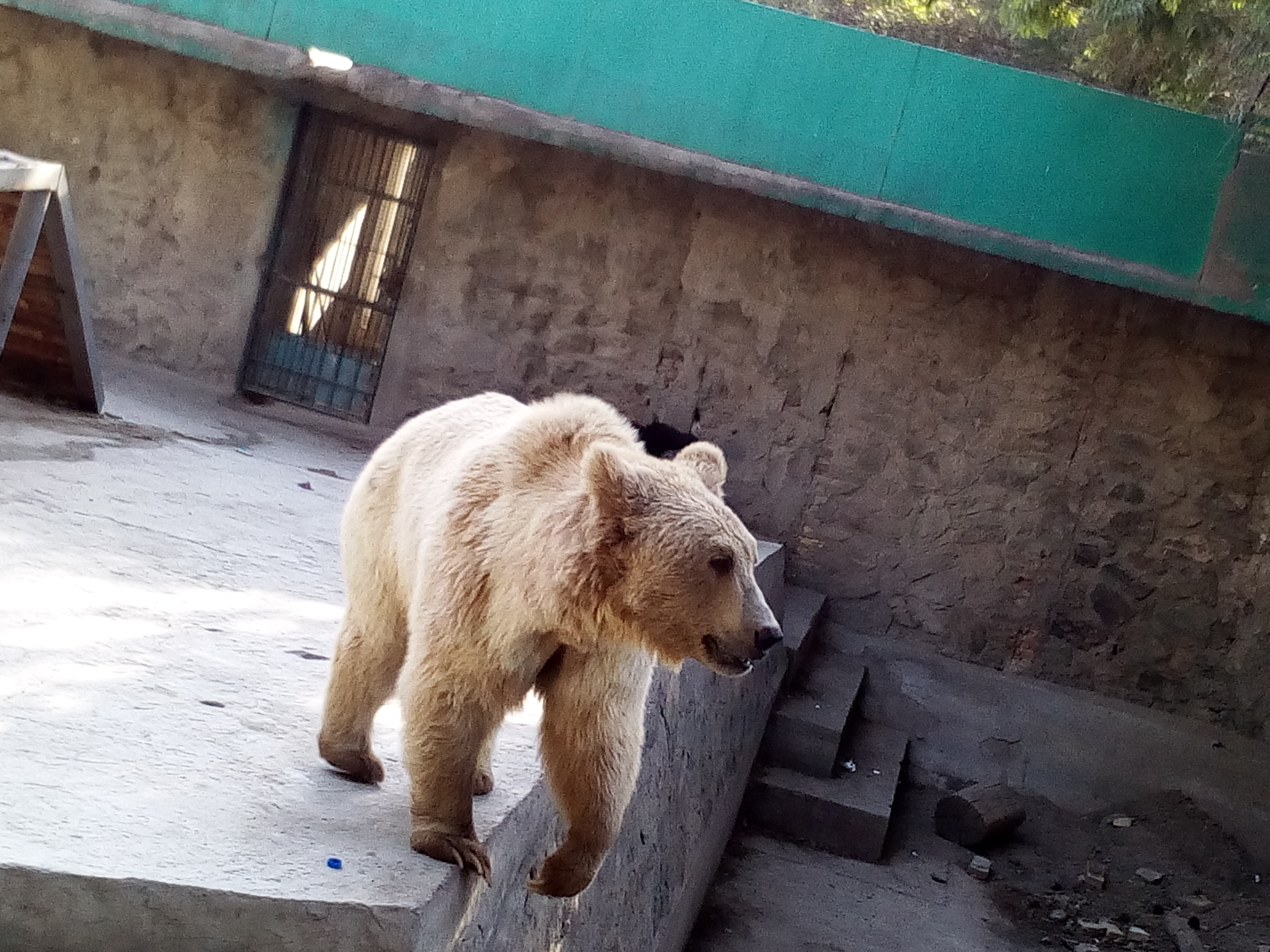
A brown bear at the Kabul Zoo in 2018.

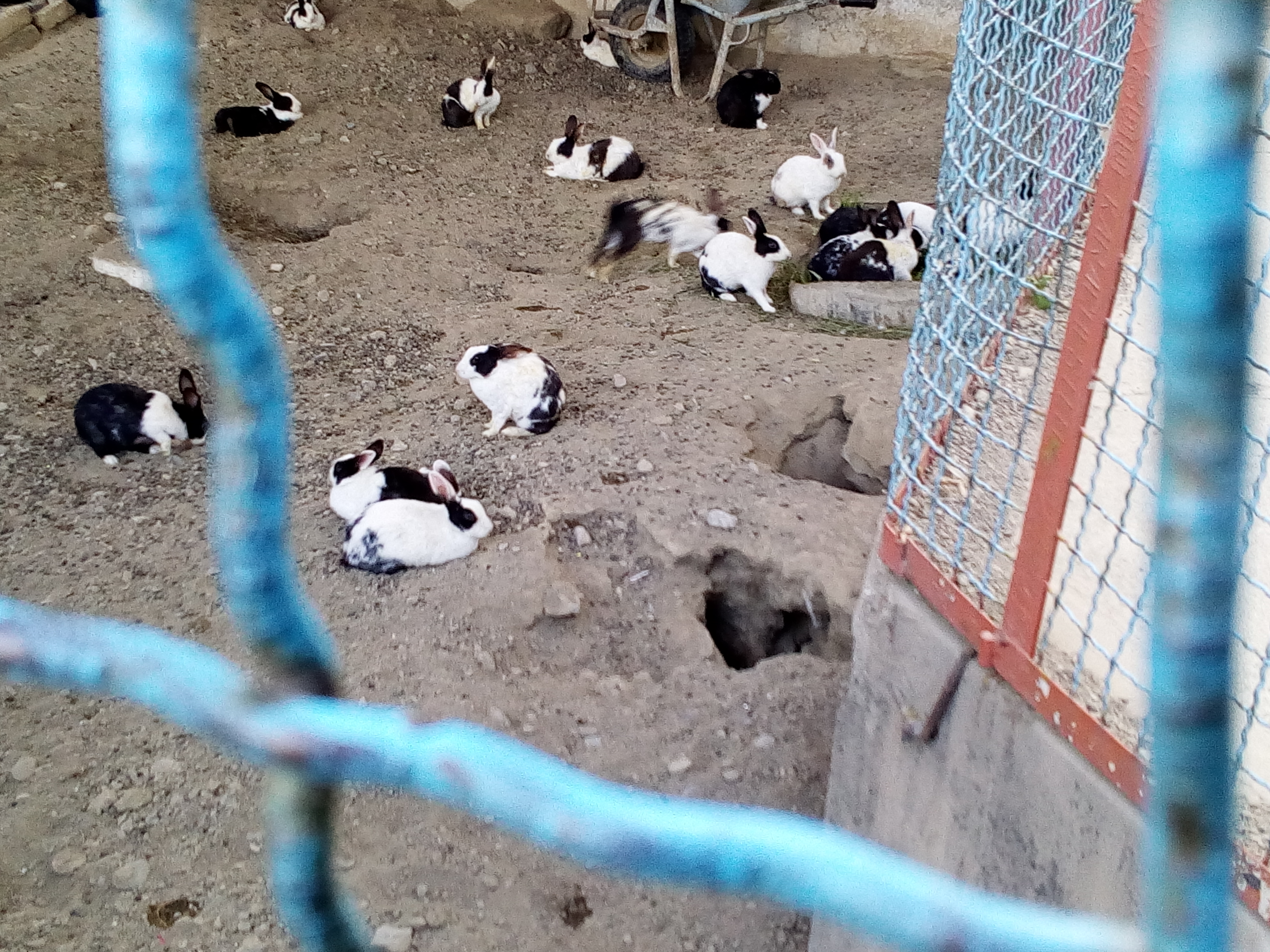
Rabbits at the Kabul Zoo in 2018.

Kabul Zoo was inaugurated in 1967 with a focus on Afghan fauna, being very popular with visitors and press. The zoo once had more than 500 animals, with about 150,000 visitors coming to see them in 1972.

The zoo suffered significant damage during the 1990s civil war; the aquarium was damaged by shelling, and combatants took the deer and rabbits for food. An elephant, 25-year-old Hathi, was killed when a rocket hit the zoo. Some exotic animals like rare species of birds, were smuggled out and sold in the black market. The Taliban, who took control of Kabul in 1996, initially thought the zoo was incompatible with their version of Islam, but kept it open after the zookeeper Sheraq Omar said research at Kabul University showed that Muhammad kept pets.

The most famous resident of the zoo was Marjan the Lion, who died in 2002 and is buried there. A bronze statue of Marjan stands at the zoo's entrance.

The zoo once had about 500 animals, including 45 species of birds and mammals, and 36 species of fish. Among the animals were two lions and Afghanistan's only pig. As many as 10,000 people visit during the weekends. The zoo employed a staff of 60 to care for the animals as of 2003. It is one of the popular places in Kabul for locals and visitors.

The zoo generated 15 million afghanis ($268,000) in revenue in 2012, which increased to 33 million in 2020.

In April 2017, the zoo took four of the white lions that were saved from a smuggling attempt. It has been reported that the zoo will be expanded in the future from its current 7.1 hectares (18 acres) of land to 29 hectares (72 acres).

=== Donations and assistance ===
- The Chinese government, a primary donor of animals, has expressed concerns about the safety of the animals it has already donated to Afghanistan. In 2004 – 2005, one male bear and one deer died, apparently from diseases and improper nutrition. Chinese authorities say they will not donate any more animals to Kabul until conditions improve.
- The North Carolina Zoo in the United States has funded and supervised many projects at the zoo, including improvements to housing of the animals, such as climbing structures and standoff barriers, with additional help in creating a business plan for the zoo. Director David Jones tried to help send Kabul Zoo staff to India, for training.
- London Zoo in the United Kingdom shared its expertise with Kabul Zoo Director Aziz Gul during a visit to London in January 2019.

== See also ==
- Tourism in Afghanistan
- Wildlife of Afghanistan
