= Gul Pacha Ulfat =

Gul Pacha Ulfat ګل پاچا الفت

President of Tribal Affairs of Afghanistan
- In office 25 April 1963 – 25 October 1965
- Prime Minister: Mohammad Yusuf

Personal details
- Born: 1909 Qarghayi District, Laghman Province, Emirate of Afghanistan
- Died: 19 December 1977 (aged 67–68) Qarghayi District, Laghman Province, Republic of Afghanistan

Gul Pacha Ulfat ګل پاچا الفت
- Occupations: Professor, Writer, Poet
- Years active: 1935 - 1967

Sayyid Gul Pacha Ulfat (Pashto: ګل پاچا الفت) was born in 1909 in Qarghayi District of Laghman Province, Afghanistan. Ulfat was a prominent poet and author of the Pashto language.

== Early life ==
Gul Pacha Ulfat, son of Meer Sayed Pacha, was born in 1909 in the village of Aziz Khan Kats, Qarghayi District of Laghman Province. After acquiring a good knowledge of Arabic and religion, he studied Sarf, Nahw, Mantiq, Hadith and Tafseer from the local Islamic scholars.

== Work life ==
After completing his religious education and private studies in 1935, he was appointed as a clerk in national Anis Newspaper. In 1949 and 1952, he was elected as member of the National Assembly by the people of Jalalabad, capital of Nangarhar Province, and people of Qarghayi District of Laghman respectively. Meanwhile, he founded the Wolas, a national weekly in 1951. He remained as the chief editor of Wolas Weekly until the end of 1953.

Ulfat attended the Grand Assembly sessions in 1955, representing the people of Jalalabad. In 1956, he was appointed as the president of the Pashto Academy, locally known as the "Pashto Tolana" and in 1963 he was promoted to a central cabinet post as the President of the Tribal Affairs. At the same time he served as a professor of Pashto language and literature in Kabul University, Faculty of Literature and Faculty of Law and Political Sciences. In 1964, he resigned from his ministerial post and was once again elected to the National Assembly by the people of Jalalabad. At the end of his term, he went into retirement.

Ulfat along with Ghulam Hassan Safi, Abdul Hadi Tokhay, Mohammad Rasul Pashtun, Fayz Mohammad Angar, Qiamuddin Khadem, Ghulam Mohayuddin Zurmulwal, Abur Raof Benawa, Nur Mohammad Taraki, and others were the founding member of Afghan political movement Weesh Zalmyan (Awakened Youth) in 1947.

== Academic contributions ==
After his retirement, Ulfat continued his contribution to the enrichment of Pashto Literature, as a poet and writer until the last moment of his life. He was the author of several books about religious, ethical, political and social matters, in verse and prose forms in addition to numerous articles. Some of his books are still unpublished. Ulfat had been awarded some medals namely Khushhal Khan, Abu Ali Sina, Education and the Star medals.

== Death ==
Gul Pacha Ulfat spent the last days of his life in his village in Laghman Province. He died on the 19 December 1977 at the age of 67 due to heart failure. He was buried in his family graveyard in the same village.
