= Marjan (lion) =

Famous lion at the Kabul Zoo, Afghanistan (c. 1976 – 2002)

Marjan (Dari: مرجان; c. 1976 – January 25, 2002) was the most famous resident of Kabul Zoo. Marjan, which in Persian means coral, was born in West Germany in 1976 and was given as a gift to Kabul Zoo in 1978 by the Cologne Zoo. He arrived in the Afghan capital and, soon afterwards, a lioness by the name of Chucha (چوچه) joined him.

The lion witnessed Afghanistan's turbulent history, from the communist coup, the Soviet occupation, the state of warlordism, and the hardline Taliban regime. During the 1990s civil war, the state of total chaos enveloped Kabul Zoo in the middle of a battlefield. The zoo was shelled on many occasions, even destroying its medical supply facility, leaving zoo personnel unable to help Marjan. He is seen as a symbol of survival and a desire for peace by the Afghan people.

== Murder attempt ==
On March 27, 1995, a soldier sneaked into the lion's den to show off his bravery to fellow soldiers. The man stroked Chucha, the lioness, who did not react, but Marjan attacked the man and killed him within minutes. The following day, the man's brother threw a hand grenade in Marjan's den in revenge of his death, seriously injuring Marjan. His eyes had to be removed by MDM, a PSF (Pharmaciens Sans Frontières) Logistics Officer who first called for help, MSF doctors and an Italian photojournalist, thus rendering him blind, deaf, and permanently disabled. Despite several operations, neither Marjan's eyesight nor his mouth could be saved. He lost all of his teeth, making it impossible for him to eat boned meat. A ramp was also built for him to get back into his den, as he was seen falling a few times while trying to make it back inside.

The incident sparked outrage with animal rights activists, local and abroad. The man who threw the grenade was violently attacked a week later, and died of injuries.

== Final years and death ==
With the arrival of the United States-led coalition in 2001 and the revealing of the devastating conditions in Kabul's once well-kept Zoo, the western media quickly picked up the story of the lion. As the news spread, Marjan became an instant celebrity and many animal welfare organizations, such as World Animal Protection, the Association of Zoos and Aquariums and many zoos around the world, lent a helping hand in form of money, medical supplies, as well as personnel that included vets and nurses. Despite overwhelming response, Marjan succumbed to old age and died in January 2002. Both private and public funeral ceremonies were held for the famous lion that was buried in the zoo. On his grave is posted a sentence in Pashto: Here lies Marjan, who was about 23. He was the most famous lion in the world.

In March 2002, China donated a pair of lions to the Kabul Zoo to replace Marjan.

== In fiction ==
Marjan is mentioned in Khaled Hosseini's novel The Kite Runner and is the central and eponymous figure in the play The Lion of Kabul by Colin Teevan, part of The Great Game: Afghanistan. Marjan appears in Denis Johnson's essay collection Seek. More recently Marjan has also been mentioned in Kim Barker’s book The Taliban Shuffle. A deleted scene in Whiskey Tango Foxtrot features the attack on Marjan.

He is also the subject of Dwyer Jones' poem, "Lion of Afghanistan (Apology to Marjan)." In a poem "In Kabul Zoo, The Lion", Jeet Thayil writes about the suffering, resilience and strength from the perspective of Marjan himself.

Marjan's story is told in Libraires envolés, Bangkok-Damas by Anne & Laurent Champs-Massart.
