= Khanzir =

Only pig in Afghanistan

Khanzir (Pashto: خنزير, lit. 'Pig') is a male pig exhibited at Kabul Zoo in Kabul, Afghanistan. The animal achieved fame as the only pig in Afghanistan, a predominantly Islamic country which has no pig farms because the eating of pork is not permitted.

In 2002, the People's Republic of China presented two piglets to the Kabul Zoo, both Khanzir and the female that became his mate. Khanzir and his mate produced piglets during the early years of the War in Afghanistan. The family of pigs was attacked by a brown bear that broke into the exhibit after a caretaker left a door open, and Khanzir was the only pig survivor.

Khanzir's status as "Afghanistan's lone pig" attracted international attention in May 2009, when he was moved into quarantine due to visitor concerns about the worldwide outbreak of influenza A (H1N1) ("swine flu"). Aziz Gul Saqib, director of Kabul Zoo, explained that Khanzir was in fact "strong and healthy", noting that "The only reason we moved him was because Afghan people don't have a lot of knowledge about swine flu, and so when they see a pig they get worried and think they will get ill." He was released from quarantine after two months.

In 2016, Khanzir weighed 500 pounds, and his longtime zookeeper said, "He doesn't move much these days, but he shows enthusiasm every time he sees me, because he knows that I bring him food". That year, the zoo began to request pigs from foreign countries to give Khanzir a new companion, but none were sent.

== See also ==
- Marjan (lion)
- List of individual pigs
