= 1945 Hazara Rebellion =

Rebellion in the Kingdom of Afghanistan

Date	November 1945 – Spring 1946 (Note: Dowlatabadi dates the first armed clash between Ibrahim Khan and the district administration to 1944 (1323 SH), and an abortive march on the district centre to late summer 1945 (Sunbula 1324 SH).)
Location	Shahristan District, Hazarajat, Kingdom of Afghanistan
Status	Rebel demands met; Taxes revoked; Rebel withdrawal; Removal of Mohammad Hashim Khan from the post of Prime Minister

Belligerents
Kingdom of Afghanistan	Hazara rebels

Commanders and leaders
(Kingdom of Afghanistan) Mohammad Hashim Khan (surrendered) (Kingdom of Afghanistan) Sayyid Abbas Lowgari (governor of Hazarajat) (Kingdom of Afghanistan) Abdul Quddus Paghmani (police commander)	Ibrahim Khan; Islam Beg

Strength
50–60 (garrison of Alqan at its surrender)	6,000 (according to Dowlatabadi) (Note: Dowlatabadi reports a muster of 6,000 men before the attack on the district centre. He notes that some writers give up to 16,000 rebels and 20,000 men on the government side, and considers these figures much too high in view of the accounts of the fighting.)

Casualties and losses
10–15 killed, 10 captured (siege of Alqan)	7–11 killed (siege of Alqan) (Note: Four to five rebels (eight according to another version) were killed in the first night, and three more in the fighting for the mosque.)

The 1945 Hazara Rebellion was a rebellion by the Hazaras in the Kingdom of Afghanistan which occurred in 1945 and 1946. Its causes laid in the introduction of a new tax imposed only on the Hazaras. It began in November 1945, when Hazara Rebels under Ibrahim Khan, also known as "Bačča-Gāw-sawār" (Son of the bull rider) revolted against the local administration of Shahristan. After a siege lasting for about a week, the district, as well as arms and ammunition, fell into the hands of the rebels.

There are two different accounts as to how the rebellion ended: According to Encyclopædia Iranica, the Afghan government sent a force to pacify the region and subsequently withdrew the tax. According to Niamatullah Ibrahimi, it ended in spring 1946, when Mohammed Zahir Shah sent a delegation to the rebels, offering to lift the tax if the rebels laid down their arms, which was accepted.

== Background ==
=== Taxation ===
According to the Hazara historian Basir Ahmad Dowlatabadi, the main grievance was a tax in clarified butter (roghan) known as roghan-e sherkat or roghan-e kata pawi. It was imposed during the premiership of Mohammad Hashim Khan on the Hazaras of the Hazarajat alone. Every animal was assessed, whether it gave milk or not, including male animals, horses, mules and donkeys. Quoting the former member of parliament Abdul Hussain Maqsudi, Dowlatabadi writes that one charak of butter was due each year for every cow, goat and sheep, so that each household owed several sir (one sir being 7 kg). Government weighers routinely credited 9 kg of butter as 7.

A sir of butter sold for about 100 afghanis in Kabul, while the government paid 22 afghanis for it, half in cash and half in cloth from the state mills at Pul-e Khumri and Jabal al-Siraj. Taxpayers carried the butter on their backs to the administrative centres, sometimes as far as Kabul. Those who could not pay fled with their families to northern Afghanistan or abroad, and their houses and land were confiscated and given to Kuchis or to supporters of the government. Dowlatabadi adds that some Hazara khans and mirs took part in this system.

The butter tax came on top of other levies described by Dowlatabadi:

- a land tax of one sir of grain for every ten harvested, due whether the land was cultivated or not;
- a livestock tax of 4 afghanis per cow, 5 per horse or donkey and 2 per sheep or goat;
- a poll tax (kala-puli) of 5 to 7 afghanis per person;
- compulsory deliveries of wheat to government granaries (gandom-e godam).

=== Kuchi incursions ===
Dowlatabadi also names the grazing of Hazara pastures by Kuchi nomads, backed by the government, as a cause of the revolt. Ibrahim Khan, son of Musa Khan, was born in 1915–16 (1294 SH) in Bargar, in present-day Shahristan District. His father, an influential local notable, had long resisted the Kuchis. He was killed in one of these conflicts by a rival, Yusuf Beg of Shahristan, who had sided with the nomads. Ibrahim Khan was then 14 or 15 years old, and took over his father's role.

== Course of the rebellion ==
Dowlatabadi's account of the rebellion summarises Ali Najafi's Riwayat-e eftekhar (1998). Dowlatabadi describes it as the only book devoted to the uprising, and as based on interviews with many witnesses.

=== First clashes (1944) ===
According to Dowlatabadi, the first confrontation took place in 1944 (1323 SH) at Alqan, the government seat of Shahristan. The district governor, Abdul Jalil, insulted men who were in arrears on the butter tax, and their religion. Ibrahim Khan drew his pistol and the governor shut himself in. Ibrahim Khan withdrew to the fort of his father-in-law, Rustam Beg, and fired from its roof on the governor's party when it came to arrest him.

The governor then sent the district police chief with ten soldiers to bring him in, without success. When government forces later surrounded his house, Ibrahim Khan's men drove them back and besieged the government fort. Local elders prevented them from burning its gate, but the government offices and the house of the qazi outside the walls were looted. The governor reported the losses to Sayyid Abbas Lowgari, head of the provincial government of Hazarajat, at 50,000 afghanis. The chiefs of Daizangi, Daikundi, Behsud and Shahristan were asked to settle the matter. One of them, Yusuf Beg, warned that more than 1,000 armed men were ready to fight.

=== Second phase (1945) ===
Ibrahim Khan then went to plead against the tax before the provincial governor, who had him imprisoned for forty days. He was released on the guarantee of Hazara chiefs. In late summer 1945 (Sunbula 1324 SH) he gathered his supporters at Bargar, detained a party of tax collectors at Ghujan and marched on Alqan. He turned back without fighting when Yusuf Beg, one of his allies, went over to the government side.

In the autumn a party of about 100 tax collectors was sent to Shahristan. After complaints of abuses at Siyah Dara, Ibrahim Khan disarmed them with about 50 men. He then declared publicly that no one should pay the butter tax, and that he would resist any attempt to collect it by force.

=== Siege of Alqan ===
The provincial police commander, Abdul Quddus Paghmani, was then sent to Shahristan and fortified Alqan. Ibrahim Khan was joined by 600 to 700 of his kinsmen and by Islam Beg with his riflemen, and Dowlatabadi reports a muster of 6,000 men. The rebels attacked at night from the village of Khwaja Chasht, about two hours' walk from Alqan.

In the first night the rebels took all the outer positions except a mosque. Four to five government men were killed, and as many rebels (eight according to another version); ten government men were captured. The mosque was taken after three days of fighting, in which three more rebels were killed. The rebels then dug two tunnels over six days and blew up one of the towers of the fort with gunpowder. The garrison surrendered after an eleven-day siege. (Note: Ibrahimi describes the siege as lasting about a week; Dowlatabadi gives eleven days.) Ibrahim Khan let the commander and his 50 to 60 men leave under escort. In all, 10 to 15 government men had been killed, and the government stores of butter, wheat and cloth fell into the rebels' hands.

The rebels then established themselves at the fort of Zardani. A government force sent by the provincial administration camped at Ribat, where it plundered the population, and fled when the rebels advanced against it. According to Dowlatabadi, the provincial governor warned Kabul that the Hazarajat was being lost, and the rebellion kept spreading into the spring of 1946.

== Negotiations and end ==
Hashim Khan left the premiership in 1946 and was succeeded by Shah Mahmud Khan; according to Dowlatabadi, ill health was the official reason given. Dowlatabadi links his departure to the rebellion, and notes that non-Hazara historians have not made this connection. (Note: Dowlatabadi gives the date as 29 Hamal 1325 SH (18 April 1946).) Shah Mahmud adopted a policy of conciliation and asked Hazara notables to end the revolt.

A delegation of 150 to 200 people gathered at Panjab. It included:

- the governor of Kabul, Ismail Khan Mayar, as the government's envoy;
- Hazara leaders from the north and from the Shaykh Ali, among them General Isa Khan;
- Hazara notables and clerics from Jaghori, Ghazni, Daizangi, Daikundi and Behsud.

At a large meeting at Zardani, Ibrahim Khan agreed to go to Kabul on three conditions:

1. the abolition of the 1,000 kharwar of butter levied on the Hazarajat (one kharwar being 80 sir);
2. an inquiry into the abuses of government officials;
3. no prosecution of those who had taken part in the uprising.

The delegation accepted the conditions. Ibrahim Khan left his brother Arzi Husayn in command in Shahristan, and travelled with the delegation to Panjab and then to Kabul.

== Aftermath ==
Ibrahim Khan remained in Kabul, where Dowlatabadi describes him as partly under surveillance. He later joined the circle of Sayed Ismail Balkhi. He was arrested in Shah-du Shamshira street in Kabul in the first hours of 1 Hamal 1329 SH (21 March 1950), and two secret agents were wounded during the arrest. Balkhi's party was broken up the same day.
