= Koh-e Asamai =

Afghan mountain range

The Koh-e Asamai (Pashto, Dari: کوه آسمایی Kōh-e Āsamā'ī) is a mountain located directly to the west of downtown Kabul, Afghanistan at an elevation of 2,126 metres (6,975 ft). It is known colloquially as the Television Hill due to the large TV mast and antennas at its summit. Asamayi is named after its Hindu temple at the foothill, which is an important site of Afghan Hindus and one of the oldest temples in Kabul. The temple was re-located in the foothill from the original location from the Peak of the mountain, which still has a small original temple site.

== History ==
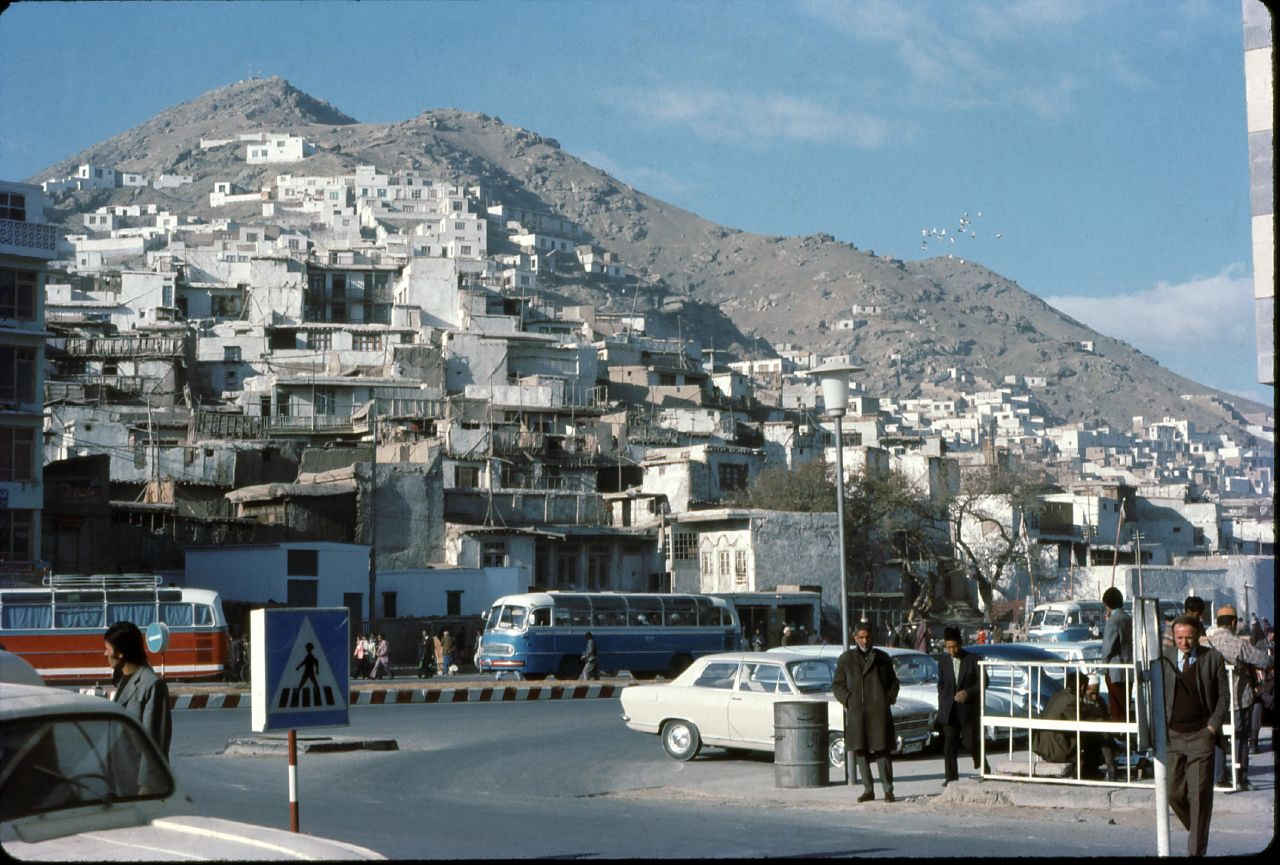
Traditional hill dwellings in the Koh-e Asamai area (1974)

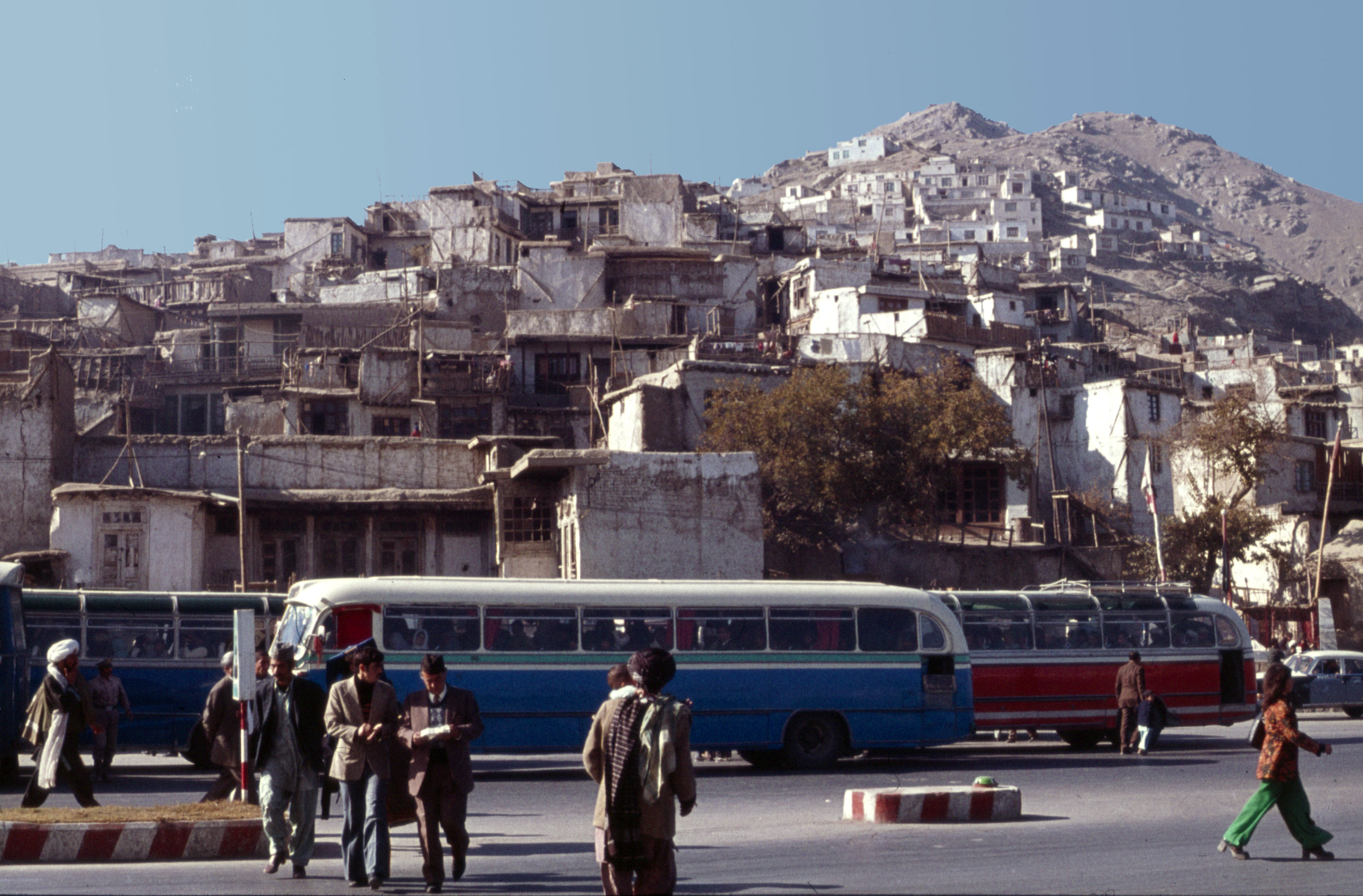
People and traffic in 1976

The mountain is the site of an ancient fort. In December 1879 during the Second Afghan War the Asamai mountains were the site of a prolonged siege and battle where the British forces made up of the 9th Lancers and 5th Punjab Cavalry

== Geography ==
The hill forms the boundary of Districts 2 and 3 and is opposite the Sher Darwaza mountain. There are three peaks with heights of 2126 m, 1975 m and 2110 m from north-west to south-east. It is only a mile away from the city center of Kabul (Deh Afghanan), dividing the center from the suburbs to the west including the Kabul University. Shahr-e Naw is to the north-east, Karte Parwan to the north-west, the old city to the south-east and Deh Mazang to the south.

== AsaMai Hindu Temple ==
The temple is named after Asha Mai ( माई, माता, माँ ) the Goddess of Hope is another name of Durga Maa, consort Lord Shiva, It is believed by Afghan Hindus that the Goddess of Hope AsaMai has been residing at the hilltop of Asamai. There is also, Asamayee Watt, adjoined to the lower part of the temple, which has been there for thousands of years, adjoining to Joi-Shir.

Ehsan Bayat funded the renovation of the temple in 2006.

Other mandirs worldwide from the Afghan Hindu diaspora are named after Asamai, denoting its importance to the community.

== Transmission site ==
It has been the location of the city's terrestrial TV masts since 1978. As of 2012, broadcasts from here are from 2 kW VHF transmitters.

== See also ==
- Hinduism in Afghanistan
- Tourism in Afghanistan
