= Pharmaciens Sans Frontières =

Humanitarian association

Pharmaciens Sans Frontières logo

Pharmaciens Sans Frontières Comité International (PSFCI) is the largest humanitarian association in the world specialized in the pharmaceutical sector. Founded in 1985 to retrieve unused drugs from chemists for use in developing countries, PSFCI extended its objectives to help developing countries set up a locally adapted health care system.

Like Médecins Sans Frontières, PSFCI was founded and based in France, but has since evolved to an international organization, with support from national associations in a number of countries, including Belgium, Canada, the Czech Republic, Denmark, Germany, Italy, Luxembourg, Morocco, the Netherlands, Norway, Poland, Spain, Sweden, Switzerland and Tunisia. PCFCI has organized missions in countries in Africa, the Balkans, Central Asia, the Far East, and Latin America.

The missions of PSFCI are typically either emergency missions to countries affected by natural, human, or economic disasters; development missions to improve healthcare in impoverished countries; and technical assistance missions.

PSFCI has received donations from the industry and members for its internal organization but claims that it relies heavily on government donations to finance international missions.

In October 2009, the French nonprofit organization Pharmaciens Sans Frontières – International Committee (PSF-CI), involved in reorganization proceedings since July 2009, wound-up by decision of the court. The French NGO Agency for Technical Cooperation and Development, one of the main charities in France, offered to take up some of the projects implemented by PSF-CI in order to continue their action in the field. Several other national and independent associations of the PSF network, like Switzerland, Denmark, Canada and Germany, are still active.

== Award ==
Pharmaciens Sans Frontières was awarded the "practitioner of the year award" for their performance during 1999 by the FIP Foundation for Education and Research.

== Pharmacists without borders Germany ==
The Association Pharmacists without borders Germany was founded in June 2000 and is based in Munich, Germany. It is an accredited non-profit and charitable organisation. More than 1,400 members in Germany and worldwide engage in various areas of our work. Most of them are pharmacists and pharmaceutical-technical assistants who work in public pharmacies, hospitals and the pharmaceutical industry.

=== Objectives ===
Improvement in health care – The aim of their work is to improve the health care provision in their project countries. Key practice areas are:

- Humanitarian aid and development cooperation

The Pharmacists without borders Germany provides high-quality pharmaceutical services for both emergency aid and development cooperation. They always consider the specific regional requirements and cooperate closely with local and international partners.

- Pharmaceutical products

They offer support with medicine of proven quality according to the guidelines of the WHO Model List of Essential Medicines.

- Training courses (basic and advanced education)

In their project countries the Pharmacists without borders Germany promote the training of pharmaceutical staff. In addition, they organise training courses, for example in hygiene or the organisation of a drug storage.
In Germany they periodically offer training courses for interested members during which they are introduced to the basics of humanitarian work for pharmacists. In addition they conduct pharmaceutical trainings for partner organisations.

- Education and advice

The Pharmacists without borders Germany are advocate against counterfeit medicines (e.g. in the project IMPACT of the WHO) and inform people about a good drug-donation practice.

=== Long term projects ===
In addition to various emergency operations in Sri Lanka, Haiti, Myanmar, India, Indonesia, Pakistan, Kenya, Bangladesh and the Philippines Pharmacists without borders Germany works on long-term projects in the following countries:

==== Argentina ====
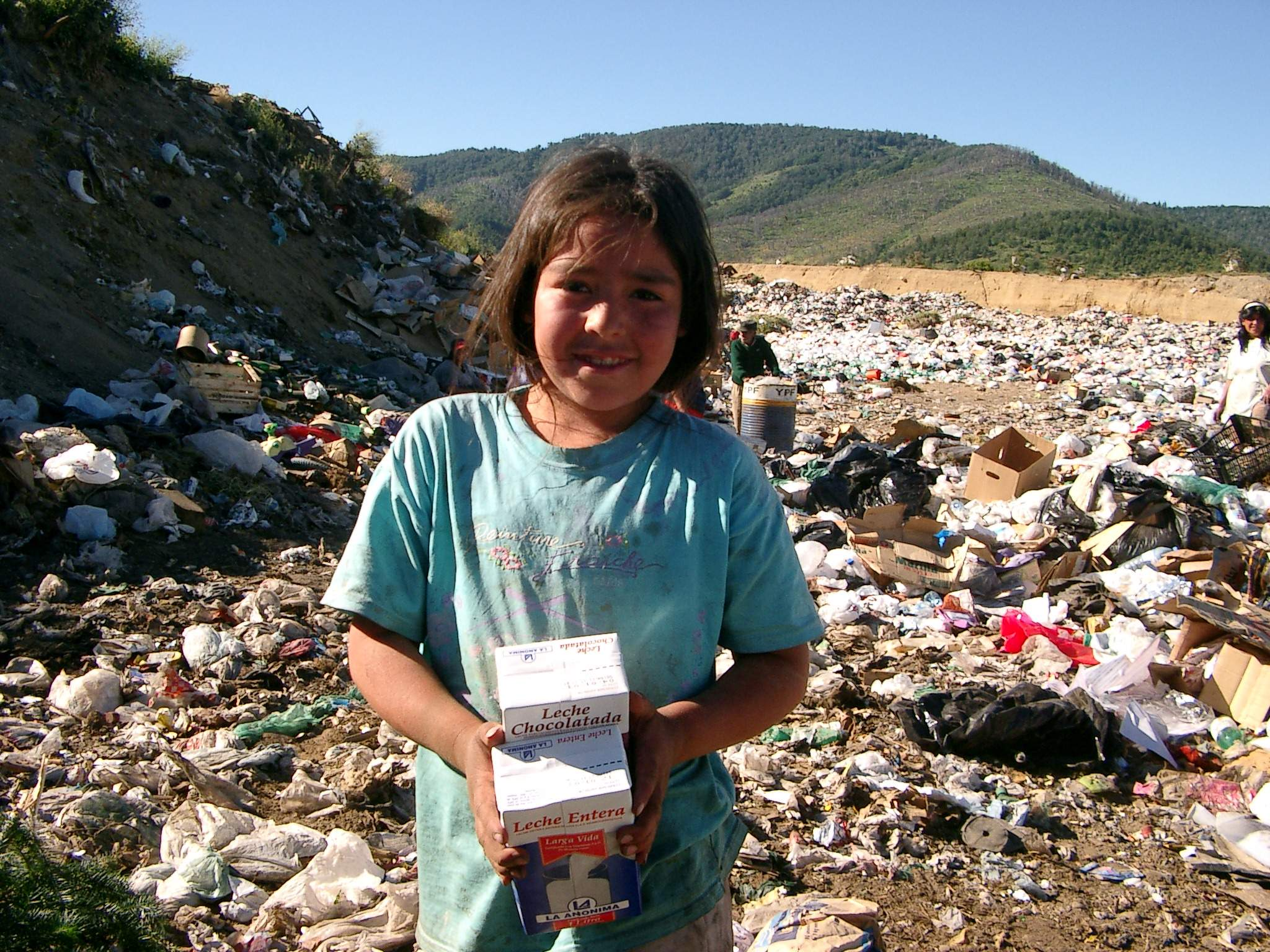
"Cartoneros" in Argentina

The aid of the Pharmacists without borders Germany in Argentina is versatile: In various locations and projects, this organisation provides the supply of medicinal products, the construction of well-functioning pharmacies in health centres, dental hygiene projects for children as well as training courses in the healthcare sector.

Their tasks include the supply of the health centre with essential pharmaceuticals, especially for people with chronic diseases such as diabetes, hypertonia and asthma. The organisation also provides reagents and test strips.

==== Haiti ====
Since 2008 the Pharmacists without borders Germany has been involved in several aid projects in Haiti.

The focus of their efforts is to create an access to health care and essential drugs for the people who need it the most. After the emergency operations in 2008 (hurricane), 2010 (earthquake) and 2010-2011 (Cholera intervention) the Pharmacists without borders Germany are focussed on the expansion of a health centre in Léogâne, a city southwest of the capital Port-au-Prince.

==== Mexico ====
The Pharmacists without borders Germany are committed to the health care of the indigenous populations of Mexico and provide a training program for health assistants, the so-called `Promotores de Salud`, and with purchasing medicinal products.

One of their cooperation partners is Justicia y Amor, a private foundation based in Mexico City. They attend to numerous communities located in the mountains of Guerrero as well as in the states of Oaxaca, Puebla, Tabasco and Veracruz.

The remote location of many indigenous communities brings a multitude of obstacles for supplying health care: Transport paths and streets are often in such a bad condition that some places can only be reached by foot.

==== Kenya ====
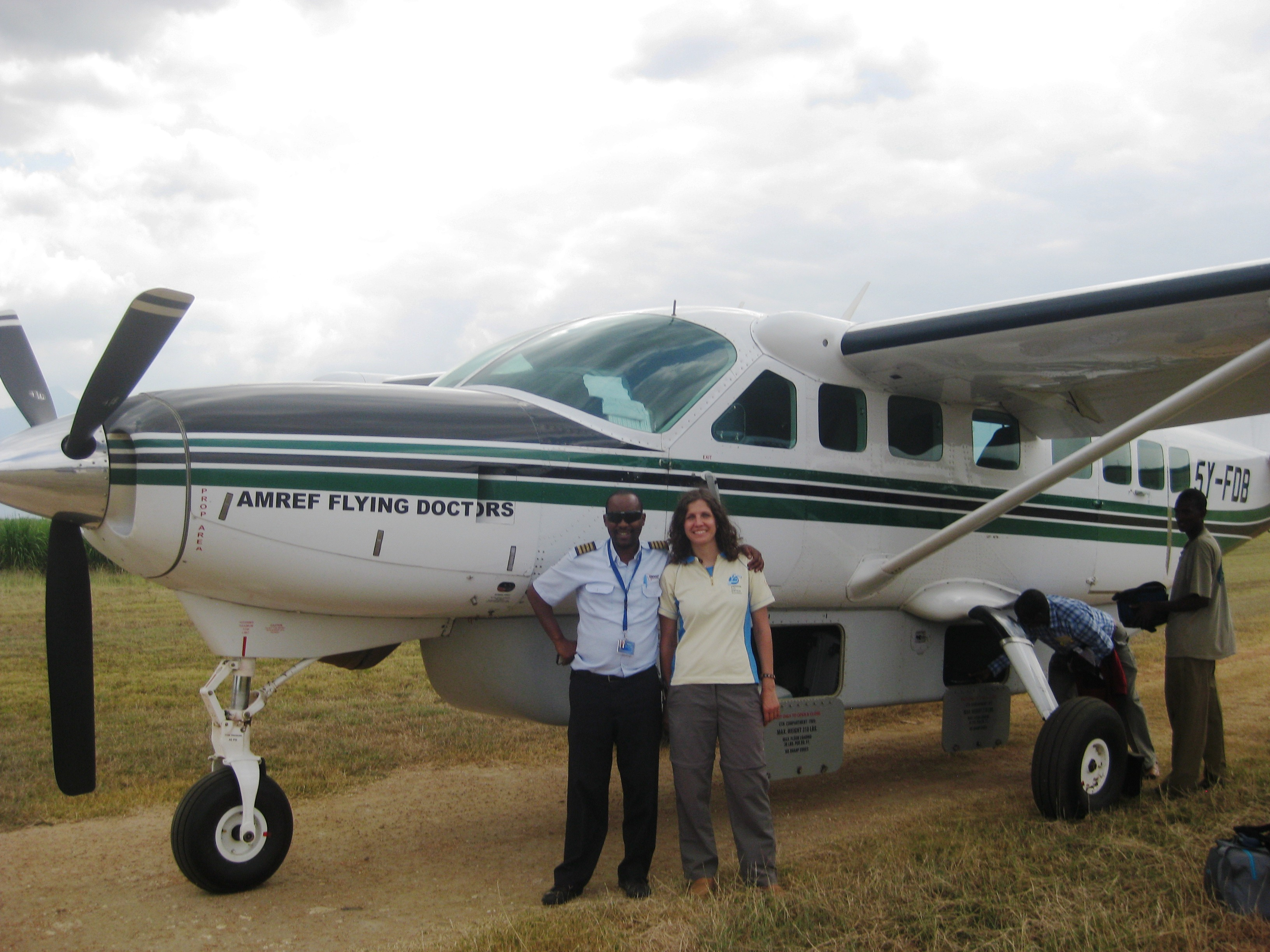
"Clinical Outreach Service" Kenia

Since 2011 Pharmacists without borders Germany support the AMREF Outreach Service and complement the nationwide supply of medical services with pharmaceuticals and personal assistance. On top of that they provide training and support to Kenyan health care workers.

The Pharmacists without borders Germany were thus reacting to the unfolding famine at the Horn of Africa. In cooperation with Landsaid e.V. they sent out pharmacists to an operation in Kenya.

==== Nepal ====
At the beginning of 2009 the Pharmacists without borders Germany started their project work in Nepal. In five villages the Primary Health Centres or Sub Health Posts are supported with drugs, dressing materials, disinfectants and other supplies which are ordered through a wholesale company in Kathmandu, the capital of Nepal.

The Pharmacists without borders Germany work together with their local partner organisation Social Welfare Association of Nepal (SWAN) and with the District Hospital in Baglung.

Several times a year German pharmacists are engaged in the improvement of the stock, the storage and the hygienic conditions in the project area. : During this time health workers are trained and further measures are discussed with representatives of SWAN.

==== Tanzania ====
In Tanzania the Pharmacists without borders Germany support the supply of the pharmaceuticals of a ward in Hanga, a city with a catchment area over 20.000 people.

The WHO estimates that every second or third drug is counterfeit. Through their support it is possible to order the pharmaceuticals in the capital Dar es Salaam at the branch of the German Drug-Donation Organisation action medeor. This ensures that those people get treated with safe pharmaceuticals.

==== Moldova ====
Already since 2003 the Pharmacists without borders Germany are involved in various projects in Moldau, the poorest country in Europe. The main effort of their work here is the health care of newborns and toddlers. Five maternity wards in the country as well as in Chisinau, the capital, receive vitamin K through the Pharmacists without borders Germany, which until this day is still unavailable in the country. Furthermore, they could specifically improve the medical equipment.

They also supply a school for pharmaceutical technical assistants in the capital with teaching material, medical equipment and reagents. The Pharmacists without borders Germany cooperate with both the Moldovan organisation Ajutor Copiilor and the French organisation Pédiatres du Monde.
