= Deh Mazang =

Deh Mazang ده‌مزنگ
- Neighborhood of Kabul
- Coordinates: 34.510467°N 69.153197°E
- Country: Afghanistan
- Province: Kabul

Deh Mazang (Dari: ده‌مزنگ), also spelled Demazang or Dih Mazang, is a hillside settlement in west Kabul, Afghanistan, located on the southern side of the Asamayi mountain. It forms part of District 3. Kabul Zoo is located to its south and Chindawol in the old city to its east. Deh Mazang is known for its former major prison which was made in the 1930s. The Deh Mazang Circle is located to its south, which connects the Asamayi Watt, Sevom Aqrab and Darulaman roads.

Mazang Khan Hilal was a pottery maker who settled in this area in the early 1700s and created clay pots, cups, and trays. People called it Deh Mazang (Mazang's Village). His family relocated and grew over the decades and was incorporated into Kabul City.
