= 1949 Afghan parliamentary election =

- 1949

All seats in the House of the People

Parliamentary elections were held in Afghanistan in 1949 after a royal proclamation was issued calling upon the people to elect the House of the People. The elections were considered relatively free, and around 40–50 opposition candidates were elected.
