= 1952 Afghan parliamentary election =

- 1952

All seats in the National Assembly

Parliamentary elections were held in Afghanistan in 1952. They followed a royal proclamation calling upon the people to elect the eighth National Assembly, consisting of 171 seats, within three months. As no census of population has ever been taken there were no electoral lists and the elections were held using public meetings in which people voted for the official candidates by acclamation. In Kabul there were two opposition candidates, but the government candidates were elected by considerable majorities when the vote was held on 20 April. However, only 7,000 of the 50,000 voters in the city participated. After liberal parties failed to win a seat, they accused the government of electoral fraud. A protest in Kabul demanding new elections was joined by university students, but dispersed by the army on the orders of Prime Minister Mohammed Daoud Khan. Several of its leaders were arrested and later jailed, with others fleeing to Pakistan.
