= Wesh Zalmian =

Awakened Youth Movement
- Founded: 1947
- Dissolved: 1951

Wesh Zalmian (Pashto: ويښ زلميان or Awakened Youth) was a reformist youth movement started in 1947 in Kandahar, Afghanistan. The movement was focused on a nationalist agenda of modernization. Following a brief period of liberalisation encouraged by Prime Minister Shah Mahmud Khan, it was dissolved in a crackdown in 1951 and 1952. The crackdown has been described as a contributing factor in the radicalisation of many leaders who later established the People's Democratic Party of Afghanistan. Noor Mohammad Tarakai stated he was a founder of the movement, and Babrak Karmal and Hafizullah Amin also said they had been involved.

== See also ==
- Khalq
- PDPA
- Mir Akbar Khyber
- Shah Mahmud Khan
- Sulaiman Layeq
