= Shah Mahmud Khan =

Afghan prime minister

Sardar Sardar Shah Mahmud Khan سردار شاه محمود خان
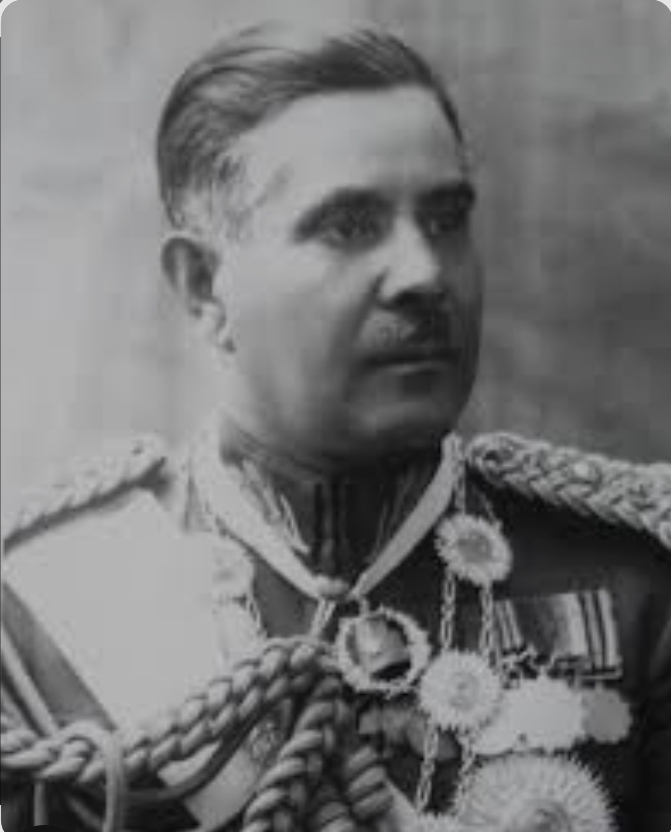

Prime Minister of Afghanistan
- In office 9 May 1946 – 7 September 1953
- Monarch: Mohammad Zahir Shah
- Preceded by: Mohammad Hashim Khan
- Succeeded by: Mohammad Daoud Khan

Personal details
- Born: 1890 Dehradun, North-Western Provinces, British India
- Died: 27 December 1959 (aged 68–69) Kingdom of Afghanistan
- Party: Wesh Zalmian

Military service
- Allegiance: Kingdom of Afghanistan
- Branch/service: Royal Afghan Army
- Battles/wars: Third Anglo-Afghan War; Afghan tribal revolts of 1944–1947; Kabul Conspiracy
- De facto ruler of the Kingdom of Afghanistan (1946–1953): ← Mohammad Hashim Khan; Daoud Khan →

Sardar Shah Mahmud Khan (Pashto/Dari: سردار شاه محمود خان – 1890 – 27 December 1959) was the Prime Minister of Afghanistan from May 1946 to 7 September 1953, under King Mohammad Zahir Shah's monarchy. He was from the Pashtun tribe of Barakzai Mohammadzai. He was a brother of King Mohammad Nadir Shah, who ousted Habibullāh Kalakāni (also known as Bacha-ye Saqao), and uncle of both Zahir Shah and Sardar Mohammad Daoud Khan, his eventual successor. His other two brothers are Sardar Mohammad Hashim Khan and Sardar Shah Wali Khan. He was married to Safora Sultan, a sister of Amanullah Khan.

== Reign ==
Under his leadership, relatively free 1949 elections were permitted, in response to a mostly middle-class youth movement wanting reforms. However, by the 1952 elections, the policy reverted to strict control. Also during his time as prime minister, the Pakistani state was formed following India's independence from the United Kingdom. The Afghans contended that the Pashtuns living in the border regions of Pakistan should be given a choice to join Afghanistan or form an independent state, which led to tense relations with Pakistan from the onset. Afghanistan went through economic troubles in the early 1950s, and having failed at an ambitious irrigation scheme in western Afghanistan, Mahmud Khan was eventually replaced by Daoud Khan.

== See also ==
- Weekh Zalmian
- Daoud Khan

Political offices
Preceded by Mohammad Hashim Khan	Prime Minister of Afghanistan; 1946–1953	Succeeded by Mohammad Daoud Khan
