= Assadullah Amin =

Afghan politician (died 1980)

Director of KAM
- In office September 1979 – December 1979
- President: Hafizullah Amin
- Preceded by: Assadullah Sarwari
- Succeeded by: Mohammad Najibullah

Personal details
- Born: Kingdom of Afghanistan
- Died: June 9, 1980 Kabul, Democratic Republic of Afghanistan
- Party: PDPA - Khalq
- Education: Kabul University

Military service
- Allegiance: Democratic Republic of Afghanistan
- Branch/service: KAM
- Battles/wars: 1979 uprisings in Afghanistan

Assadullah Amin (Pashto: اسدالله امین) was an Afghan politician and the nephew of Hafizullah Amin, who was an Afghan communist head of state for three months from September 1979 until his killing in late December that year.

Asadullah was the head of the Afghan intelligence agency KAM from September 1979 until December 1979, when his uncle was assassinated by the KGB. Assadullah Amin was executed by the Soviet-backed Afghan Government of Babrak Karmal for his role in KAM a year later.

== Biography ==
Assadullah Amin was born to a Kharoti Ghilzai Pashtun family. In 1977, Asadullah Amin graduated from Kabul University. Following the Saur Revolution in 1978, Asadullah served as the Deputy Minister of Health and Secretary of the Kabul City Committee. In September 1979, Asadullah's uncle Hafizullah Amin had consolidated power to become the new leader of Afghanistan. Asadullah was appointed as the head of the National Security Committee more commonly known as KAM. He was present during an attempted assassination attempt on his uncle by the Soviet KGB. The Soviets had attempted to poison President Amin along with his guests. None of the guests died, however, as they had been drinking Coca-Cola which diluted the poison. Assadullah's condition was serious and he was sent to a hospital in Moscow. Following Operation Storm-333, Hafizullah Amin was killed by the Soviets. Assadullah Amin was extradited back to Afghanistan, now under the rule of the Parchamite Babrak Karmal. He was tortured to testify against his uncle, but he didn't do so. On June 9, 1980, he was executed.

== See also ==
- Hafizullah Amin
- KhAD
- Khalq
- Mohammad Najibullah

== Sources ==
- Arnold, Anthony (1983). Afghanistan's Two-party Communism: Parcham and Khalq. Hoover Press. ISBN 978-0-8179-7792-4.
