= Assadullah Sarwari =

Former Afghan politician

- اسد الله سروري

Director of AGSA
- In office April 1978 – September 1979
- President: Nur Muhammad Taraki
- Preceded by: Office Established
- Succeeded by: Asadullah Amin

Vice President of Afghanistan
- President: Babrak Karmal
- Preceded by: Sultan Ali Keshtmand
- Succeeded by: Nur Ahmed Nur

Personal details
- Born: 1941 (age 84–85) Ghazni Province, Kingdom of Afghanistan
- Party: People's Democratic Party of Afghanistan-Khalq

Military service
- Allegiance: Democratic Republic of Afghanistan (1978–1980)
- Branch/service: Royal Afghan Air Force; AGSA
- Years of service: 1978–1992

Assadullah Sarwari (Dari: اسد الله سروری) is an Afghan former politician, former ambassador to the Mongolian People's Republic and convicted war criminal who belonged to the Khalq faction of the communist People's Democratic Party of Afghanistan (PDPA). He was born in Ghazni Province.

== Career ==
Asadullah Sarwari was born in 1930 in Ghazni Province into a Tajik family. Sarwari received his education in the Soviet Union and would later serve as a helicopter pilot for the Royal Afghan Air Force during the monarchy of Mohammed Zahir Shah, and later as the air force garrison commander under President Mohammed Daoud Khan, who ousted Shah in a coup in 1973.

When the Communist government took over during the Saur Revolution, in which Daoud was deposed and killed, Sarwari was appointed head of the Afghan Security Service (AGSA) in 1978 and continued to serve until he was replaced by Hafizullah Amin's nephew, Asadullah Amin in October 1979.

In September 1979 Sarwari was involved in a pro-Nur Muhammad Taraki plot to oust Prime Minister Hafizullah Amin. After the failure of the plot, he and his comrades (the 'Gang of Four') escaped to the Soviet Embassy, where he was given asylum until the Soviet invasion and the fall of Amin in December 1979.

After the invasion, under the government of Babrak Karmal, Sarwari was first given the position of deputy prime minister, but he was soon removed from the government and posted as ambassador to Mongolia from 1980 to 1986. In January 1980, Sarwari also became a member of the PDPA Politburo. In 1981, he was stripped of membership in the PDPA Politburo, and expelled from the party's Central Committee five years later in July 1986. President Mohammad Najibullah appointed him as ambassador to East Germany until 1988 and then South Yemen in 1989.

Sarwari was expelled from the party following his alleged role in support of Shahnawaz Tanai's coup attempt in 1990.

In May 1992, after the collapse of the Afghan government, Sarwari was arrested by the Shura-e Nazar militia of Ahmad Shah Massoud and was kept in detention in Panjshir. In 2005, he was transferred to the National Directorate of Security (NDS).

== Death sentence and imprisonment ==
On December 25, 2005, he was charged with the involvement in the arbitrary arrest, torture and mass killing of hundreds of opponents during his tenure as head of Afghan intelligence for a period of one year. On February 25, 2006, he was sentenced to death by firing squad for ordering the killing of over 400 people; he was cleared of charges involving conspiracy against the post-Communist government. His was the first trial involving war crimes in Afghanistan in the post-Taliban era. The proceedings of the trial were condemned by the Amnesty International as "grossly unfair".

Reuters reported that he received a death sentence in January 2006. In 2008 a court of appeal commuted his sentence to 19 years' imprisonment. He was released from jail in January 2017.
