= Fatana Najib =

Afghan linguist

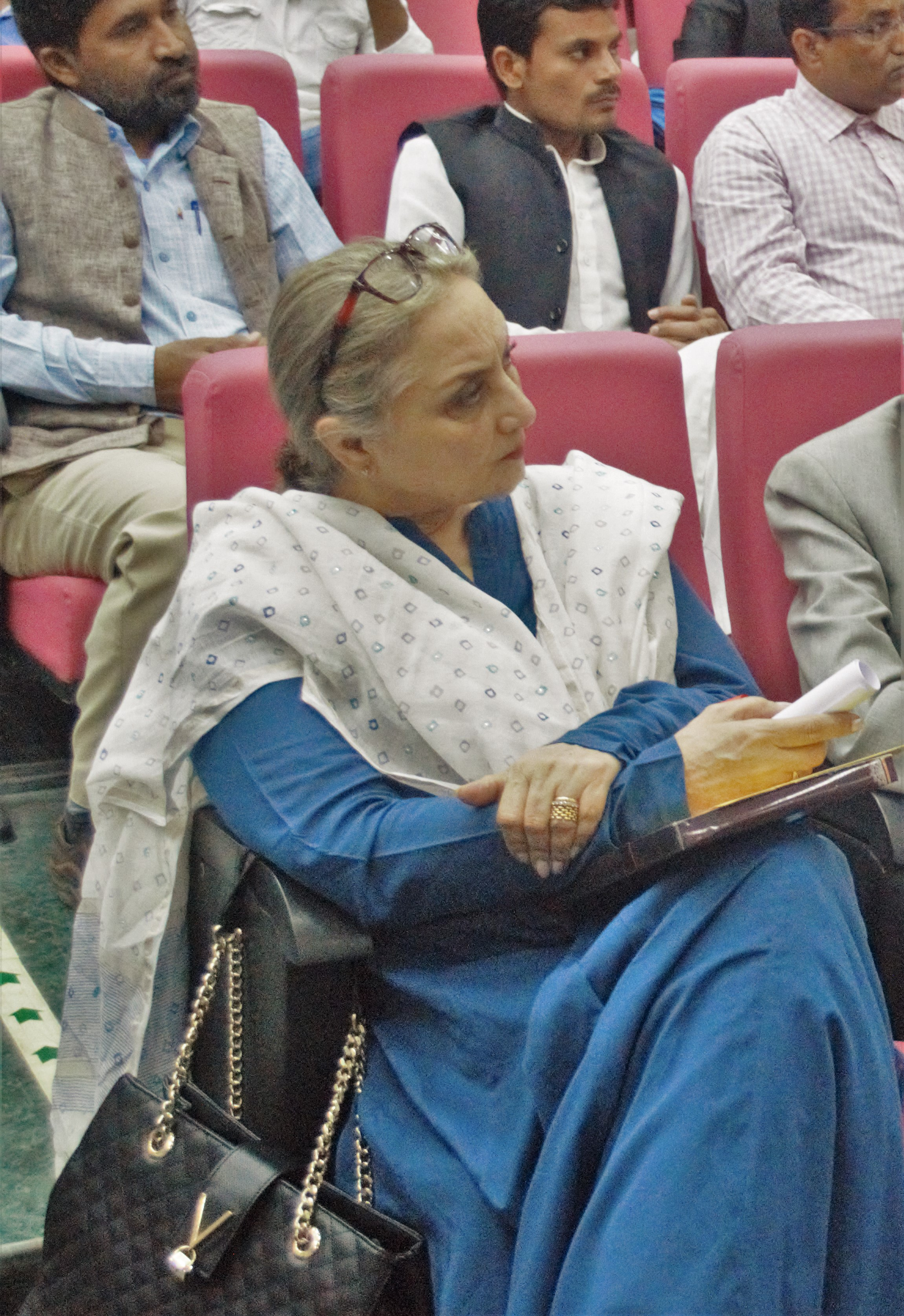
- Najib in 2016

First Lady of Afghanistan
- In role: 4 May 1986 – 16 April 1992
- President: Mohammad Najibullah
- Predecessor: Mahboba Karmal
- Successor: Vacant (1992–2001); Zeenat Karzai
- Born: 9 August 1953 (age 72)
- Spouse: Mohammad Najibullah (m. 1974; died 1996)
- Children: 3
- House: Barakzai
- Occupation: Linguist

Fatana Najib (born 9 August 1953) is an Afghan linguist and former First Lady of Afghanistan. She served as First Lady from 30 September 1987 until 16 April 1992. She was the wife of PDPA general secretary and Afghan president Mohammad Najibullah, who was murdered in 1996 by the Taliban. During her period as First Lady, Najib provided support to families of servicemembers of the Afghan Armed Forces, visiting the families of wounded soldiers.

== Personal life ==
Fatana Najib is from the royal line of King Amanullah.

Fatana Najib met the future Afghan leader, Mohammad Najibullah when she was an eighth-grade student and he was her science tutor. They married on September 1, 1974, and had three daughters, Heela (born 1977), Moska (born 1984) and Onai (born 1978). Najib later became principal of the Peace School in Kabul.

Najib and her three daughters fled Afghanistan in 1992 to live in exile in Delhi, India. She has resided in India ever since, while Heela and Moska have studied and worked abroad. Heela has worked and lived in Thailand and currently lives in Switzerland where she graduated from Franklin College and now studies for a Ph.D. in religious studies at the University of Zurich. Moska was also educated in Switzerland and lives and works in Singapore.
