= Rula Ghani =

First Lady of Afghanistan from 2014 to 2021

- رولا غنى
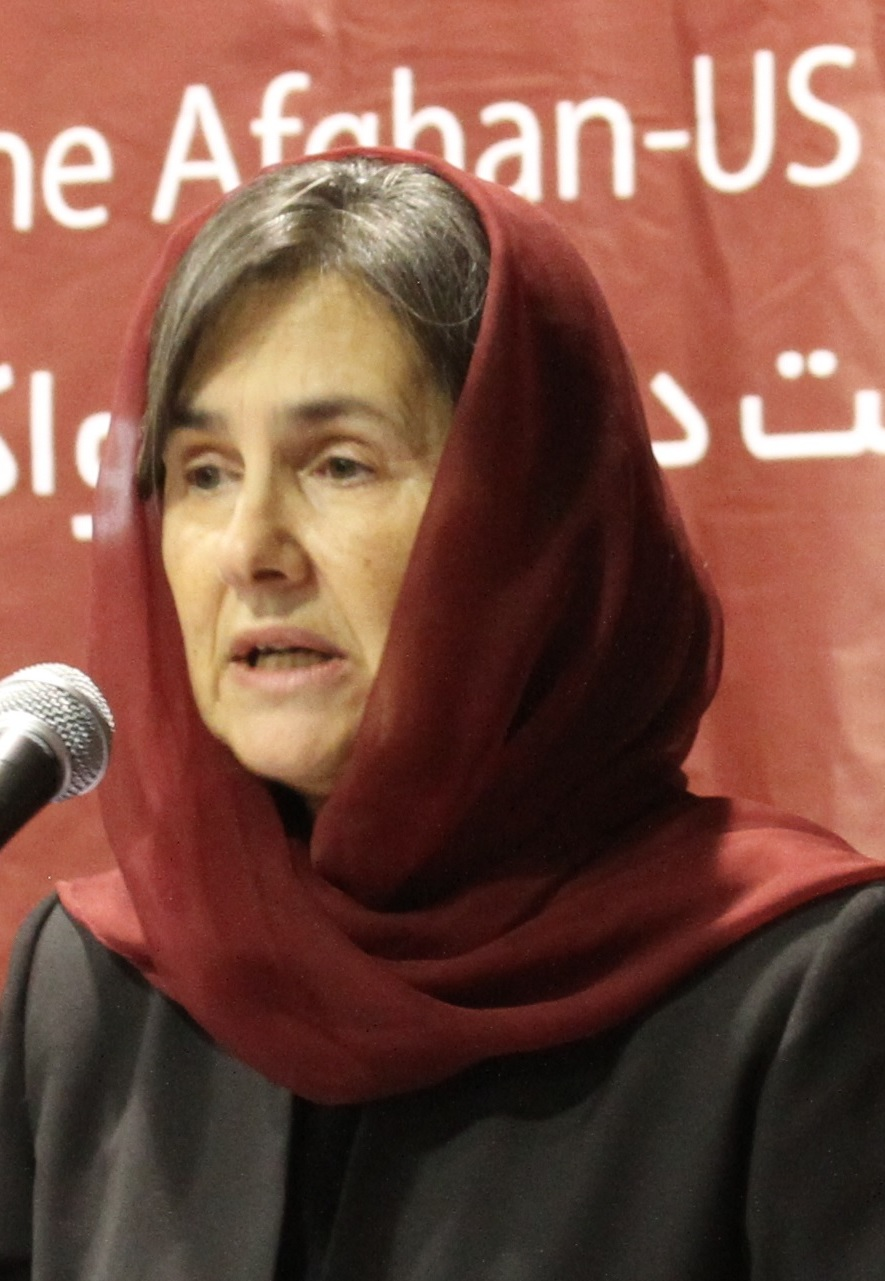
- Ghani in 2014

First Lady of Afghanistan
- In role 29 September 2014 – 15 August 2021
- President: Ashraf Ghani
- Preceded by: Zeenat Karzai

Personal details
- Born: Rula F. Saadah; 1948 (age 77–78) Lebanon
- Citizenship: Lebanon; Afghanistan; United States
- Spouse: Ashraf Ghani (m. 1975)
- Children: 2, including Mariam
- Education: Sciences Po University, Paris; American University of Beirut; Columbia University
- Religion: Maronite Catholicism
- Nickname(s): بی بی گُل; Bibi Gul

Rula F. Saadah Ghani (nickname: Bibi Gul; born 1948) is a former first lady of Afghanistan and wife of former president of Afghanistan, Ashraf Ghani.

In 2015, Rula Ghani was named to the Time 100, a list of the world's most influential people, by Time magazine.

== Personal life ==
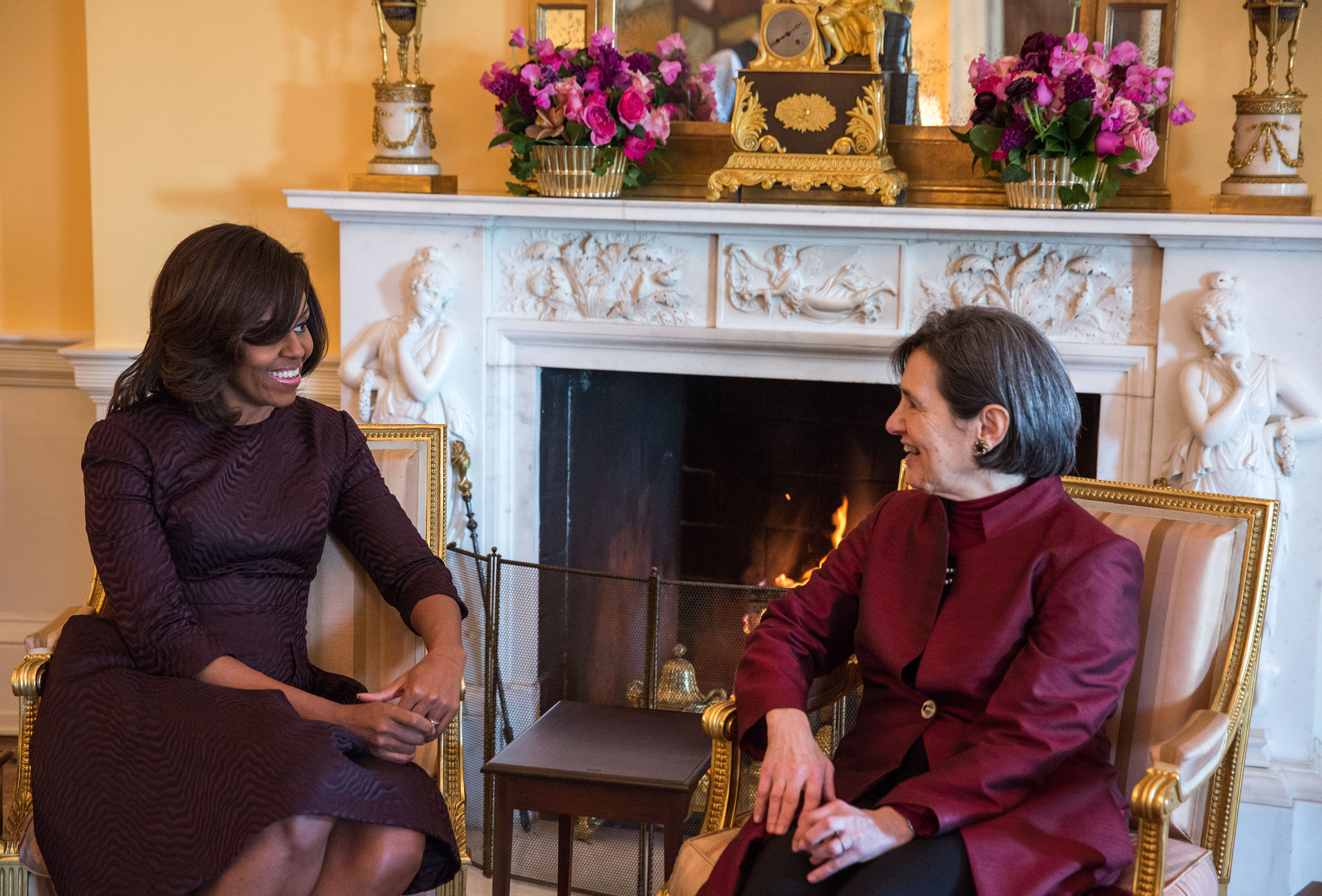
Michelle Obama hosts a tea with Rula Ghani, 2015.

Rula Ghani was born Rula Saade or Roula Saadé and raised in Lebanon, in a Lebanese Maronite Catholic family. She received a diploma from Sciences Po, France, in 1969. She completed a master's degree in Political Studies from the American University of Beirut in 1974, where she had met her future husband, Ashraf Ghani.

The couple married in 1975 and have two children: a daughter, Mariam Ghani, a Brooklyn-based visual artist, and a son, Tariq. Rula Ghani earned another master's degree in journalism from Columbia University in New York City in 1983. She returned to Afghanistan in 2003.

Ghani holds citizenship in Afghanistan, Lebanon, and the United States. She reportedly speaks Arabic, English, French, Pashto and Dari.

=== Since 2014 ===
At his presidential inauguration in 2014 Ghani publicly thanked his wife, acknowledging her with an Afghan name, Bibi Gul. "I want to thank my partner, Bibi Gul, for supporting me and Afghanistan," said President Ghani, looking emotional. "She has always supported Afghan women and I hope she continues to do so." Historian Ali A Olomi argued in 2017 that, following the precedent of Afghanistan's Queen Soraya, Rula Ghani could help bring real change for women's rights in the country.

As First Lady, Ghani was an advocate for women's rights.

On 15 August 2021, Ghani fled from Afghanistan with her husband, children, and two close aides as the Taliban captured Kabul; the Arg, the Afghan presidential palace, was captured a few hours later by the Taliban. On 18 August 2021, the government of the United Arab Emirates said that the Ghani family were in their country.

== See also ==
- Hamid Karzai
- Hashmat Ghani Ahmadzai
- Queens of Afghanistan
