= First Lady of Afghanistan =

Ceremonial position for the spouse of the Afghan head of state

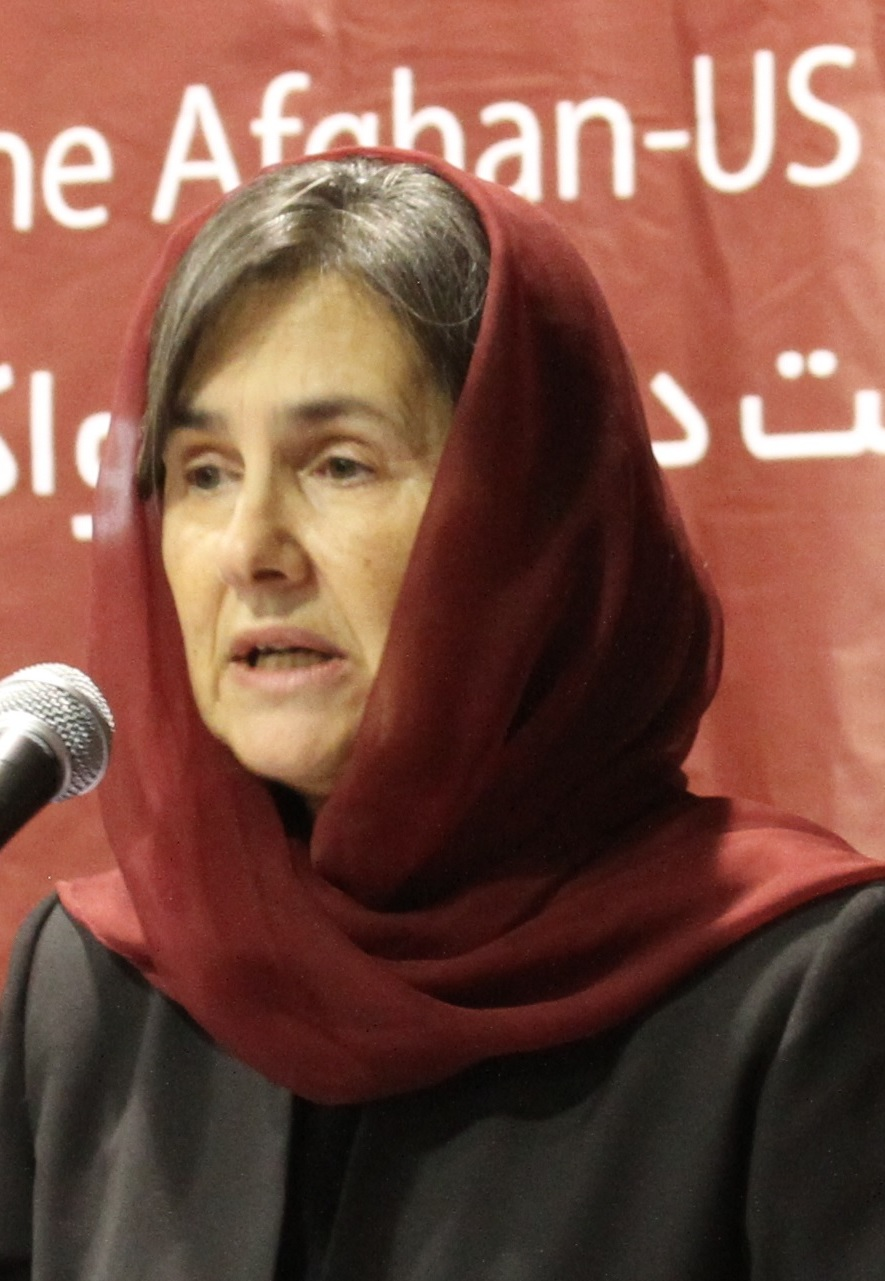
- Final holder Rula Ghani; 29 September 2014 – 15 August 2021
- Status: Presidency abolished
- Residence: Presidential Citadel, Kabul, Afghanistan
- Term length: Concurrent with the president's term (unless a divorce or death takes place)
- Formation: 17 July 1973
- First holder: Zamina Begum
- Final holder: Rula Ghani
- Abolished: 15 August 2021

First Lady of Afghanistan was the title attributed to the wife of the president of Afghanistan. Rula Ghani, wife of former President Ashraf Ghani, was the last and most recent first lady of Afghanistan from 2014 to 2021.

== List of first ladies of Afghanistan ==
(Scroll Down)

Nº	Image	First Lady	Birth	Marriage	President	Tenure began	Tenure ended	Age at tenure start	Death
1		Zamina Begum	1917	September 1934	(Afghanistan) Mohammed Daoud Khan	17 July 1973	28 April 1978	55–56	1978
2		Nur bibi Taraki			(Afghanistan) Nur Muhammad Taraki	30 April 1978	14 September 1979		
3		Patmana Amin			(Afghanistan) Hafizullah Amin	14 September 1979	27 December 1979		
4		Mahboba Karmal	1934	1953	(Afghanistan) Babrak Karmal	27 December 1979	4 May 1986		
5		Fatana Najib	1953		(Afghanistan) Mohammad Najibullah	30 September 1987	16 April 1992		-
6	Zenat Karzai	Zeenat Karzai	1970	1999	(Afghanistan) Hamid Karzai	22 December 2001	29 September 2014	31	-
7	Rula Saadah	Rula Saadah	1948	1975	(Afghanistan) Ashraf Ghani	29 September 2014	15 August 2021	64	-

== See also ==
- Queens of Afghanistan
- President of Afghanistan
- List of presidents of Afghanistan
- List of monarchs of Afghanistan
