= Watan Party of Afghanistan =

Former political party in Afghanistan

Homeland Party of Afghanistan Pashto: د افغانستان د وطن ګوند Dari: حزب وطن افغانستان
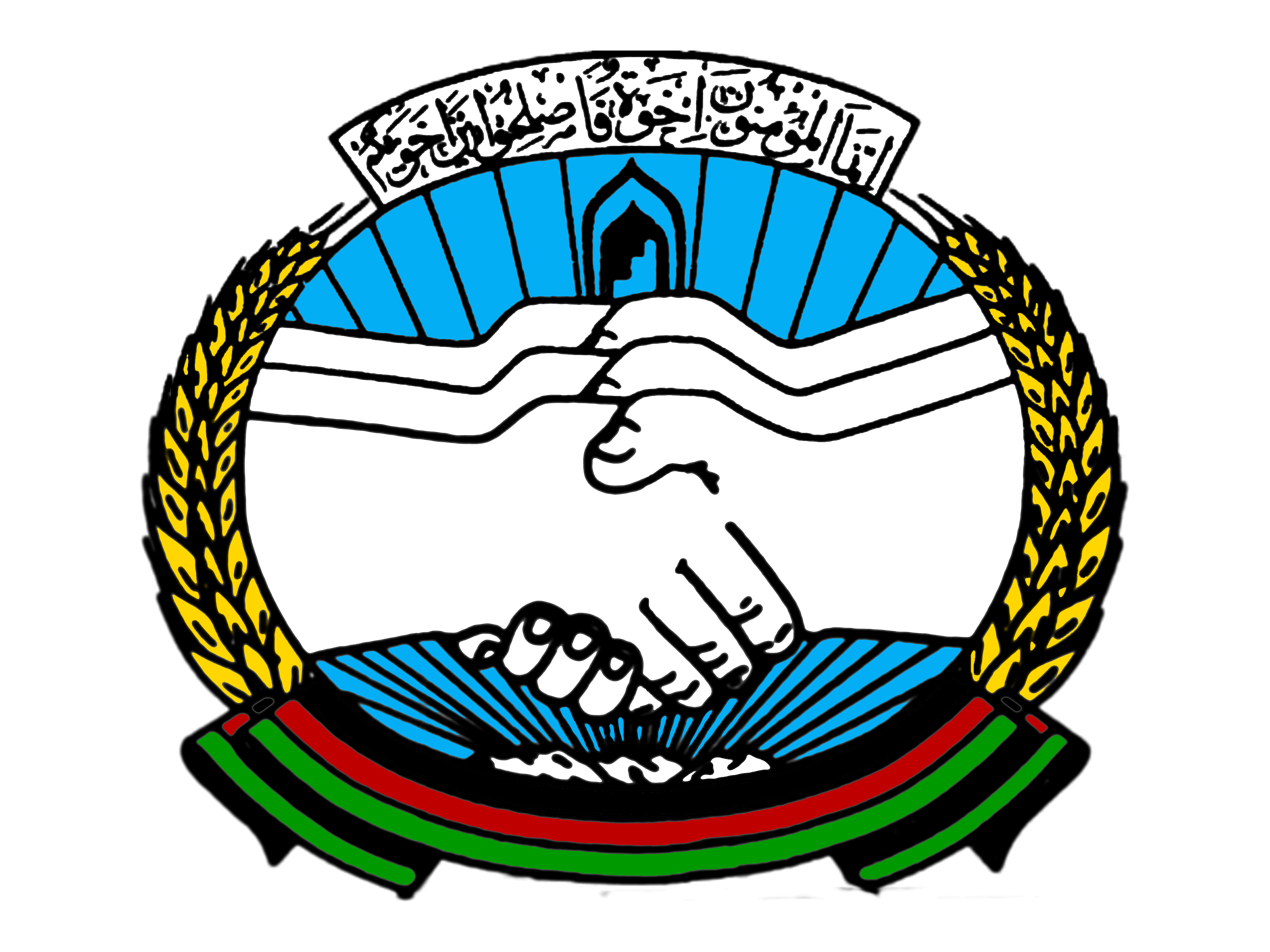
- Founders: Mir Afghan Bawary
- Founded: 28 June 1997 (29 years, 128 days)
- Banned: 16 August 2023 (3 years, 79 days)
- Preceded by: Homeland Party
- Membership: 13,000
- Ideology: Afghan nationalism (Civic nationalism); Social democracy
- Political position: Centre-left

Party flag
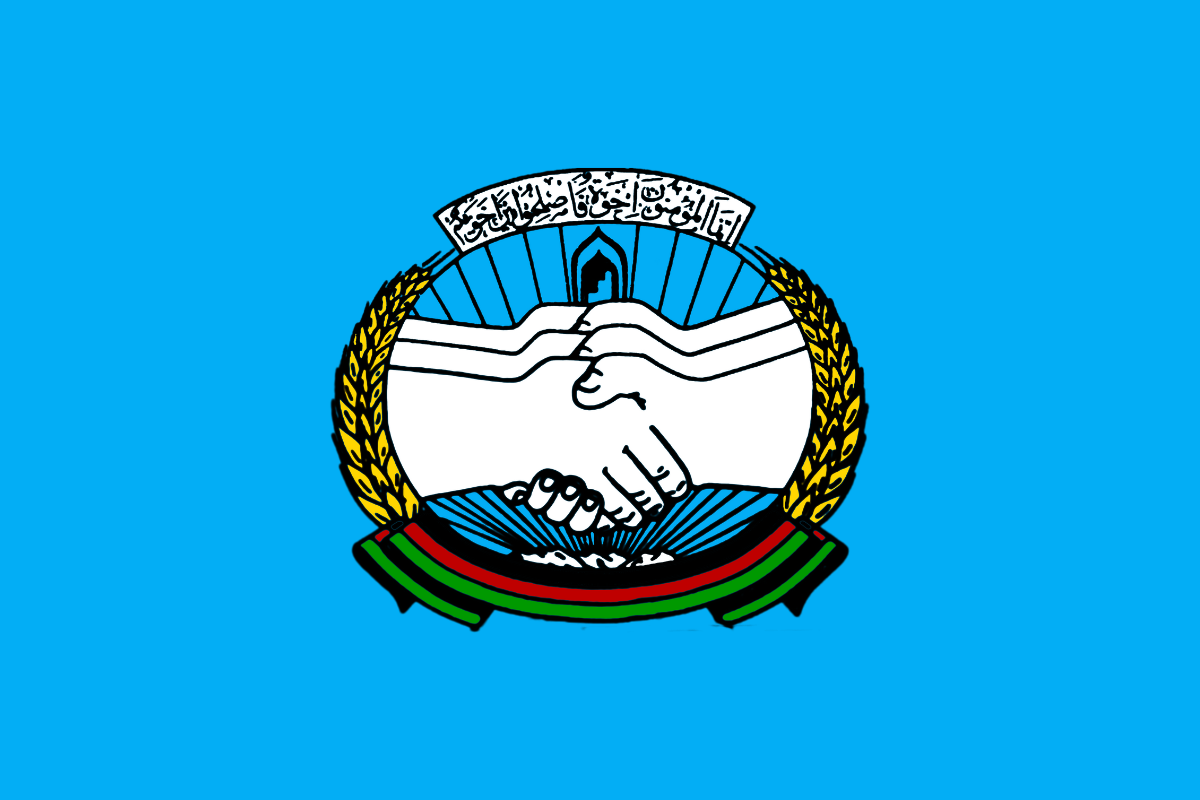

Website
- www.hezbe-watan.com

The Homeland Party of Afghanistan (Pashto: د افغانستان د وطن ګوند, romanized: Da Afghanistan Da Watan Gwand; Dari: حزب وطن افغانستان, romanized: Hezb-e Watan-e Afghanistan) was a political party in Afghanistan. The party considered itself the successor to former President Mohammad Najibullah's ruling Watan Party which was banned following his overthrow in 1992. The party has described itself as "national and democratic, progressive and reformist".

== History ==
The party was founded in exile during the time of the first Taliban regime on 28 June 1997 in Munich, Germany, and has members inside the country where it is not officially registered. It considered itself a continuation of the leftist ideas of Mohammad Najibullah and his Watan Party, which was established in 1990 as the successor to the ruling People's Democratic Party of Afghanistan (PDPA). The Munich conference elected Muhammad Isa Jassur as the leader of the party. The party held its second congress in Frankfurt/Main in 2000.

On 28 July 2017, thousands attended an event at a Kabul hotel for the fourth "consultative gathering for a legal relaunch of Watan Party". In the past, the party has attempted to register under the PDPA name, but has been refused registration.

== Ideology ==
The party does not identify with either the Khalq or Parcham (which they refer to as "Karmalist"). The Party has described itself as "national and democratic, progressive and reformist" and is against foreign interference in Afghanistan, particularly from the Pakistanis. At the party's second congress in November 2000, it declared all former PDPA leaders, including Babrak Karmal, and the officers linked to Dostum's anti-Najib 'coup' in 1992 'national traitors' and barred them from party membership.

== See also ==
- Mohammad Najibullah
- Abdul Jabar Qahraman
- National United Party of Afghanistan
