= Abdul Jabar Qahraman =

Afghan Army general, militia leader and politician

Personal details
- Born: 1959 Kandahar, Kingdom of Afghanistan
- Died: October 17, 2018 (aged 58–59) Lashkargah, Islamic Republic of Afghanistan
- Party: HIG (1978–1982); PDPA (1982–1990); Homeland Party (1990–1992); HIG (1992–1993); Watan Party (2017–2018)

Military service
- Branch/service: KhAD; Afghan Army
- Rank: General
- Battles/wars: Soviet-Afghan War; Afghan Civil War (1989-1992); Afghan Civil War (1992-1996); War in Afghanistan (2001–2021)

General Abdul Jabar Qahraman (Pashto (Note: Pashto pronunciation: [ʔab.dul d͡ʒa.bɑr kah.ra'mɑn, ʔab.dul d͡ʒa'bɑr kɑ'ra.mɑn]): عبدالجبار قهرمان) was an Afghan military officer, warlord and politician. He was the de facto ruler of Helmand from 1992 to 1993 retaining Helmand's secular character until being ousted and forced into exile following an offensive by Rabbani's forces.

In 2017 Qahraman revived Najibullah's Homeland Party. Qahraman was assassinated by the Taliban on October 18, 2018.

== Early career and military background ==
Abdul Jabar Qahraman was born to a Noorzai Durrani Pashtun family in Kandahar province. His family had a modest background, with his father being a shopkeeper. However, Qahraman's exceptional talents were recognized early on when he was talent-spotted by the national military commission during his time at the Ghazi Abdullah Khan Lycee in Kandahar. In 1976, he was sent to Kabul to join the military high school.

However, the Saur Revolution in Afghanistan in 1978 influenced Qahraman's path. Some of his peers opted to join militant groups, believing the conflict to be a struggle between Islam and the non-believers. Qahraman initially joined Hezb-e Islami led by Gulbuddin Hekmatyar but eventually had a change of heart, realizing that the group's alignment with Pakistan might not serve Afghanistan's national interests. He returned to Kandahar with the help of friends in the Ministry of Interior and the intelligence agency, KHAD. He was sent to Tashkent for 3 months of training, afterwards being deployed to Spin Boldak as part of KhAD. He initially recruited 25 men until he was transferred to Maiwand where he built up another group and was extremely successful commanding a militia of over 500 men. In 1984 the Ministry of Defense realized Jabar's potential to build up militias transferring him out of KHAD. He retained his base in Maiwand but ended up commanding an independent brigade group in 1988. Jabar's forces were deployed in Hemland, Paktia, Kandahar and were tasked with protecting the Kandahar-Kabul highway. He was reportedly on a first names basis with President Najibullah, Defense Minister Mohammed Rafie and key members of both Parcham and Khalq. In Maiwan Jabar got the nickname "Qahraman" meaning Hero for pushing back the Mujahedeen. Later on his militia received division status and even got higher pay then the Afghan Army itself.

In August 1991 Soviet hardliners launched a coup against President Gorbachav, the coup failed, many of the coup supporters being supporters of the Najibullah Government. In January 1992 the new Russian president Boris Yeltsin ceased all support for the Najibullah government. Being internationally isolated Najibullah announced his willingness to resign in March 1992. This led to many of his Militias and own party members switching sides mostly based on ethnic lines. In April 1992 Najibullah was removed from power by 4 Tajik Generals who invited Ahmad Shah Massoud into Kabul. The predominantly Pashtun Khalqist generals aligned with Gulbuddin Hekmatyar while Tajik Generals aligned with Massoud. Jabar talked directly to Hekmatyar and rejoined Hezbi Islami helping Hekmatyar's forces into Kabul to counter the militias of Ahmad Shah Massoud. Jabar would be the de facto ruler of Helmand province from 1992 to 1993 with Helmand retaining its secular character under Jabar.

In 1993 an offensive by the Islamist ethnic Tajik warlord Ismail Khan who was loyal to Burhanuddin Rabbani's Islamic State of Afghanistan, forced Jabar to evacuate his secular enclave, with Abdul Rashid Dostum who was allied with Hezbi Islami Gulbuddin at the time, helping conduct the aerial evacuation of the Helmand Militia.

== Exile ==
During his period of exile, Jabar spent time in different locations. He enjoyed protection under veteran nationalist politician Mahmood Khan Achakzai in Quetta. Additionally, he found support and shelter in Mazar-i-Sharif, under the protection of General Abdul Rashid Dostum.

Apart from these external locations, Jabar also spent time in Moscow, where he engaged in export-import business activities. Throughout his exile, Jabar continued to offer advice and insights but refrained from being a major conflict actor.

== Return and assassination ==
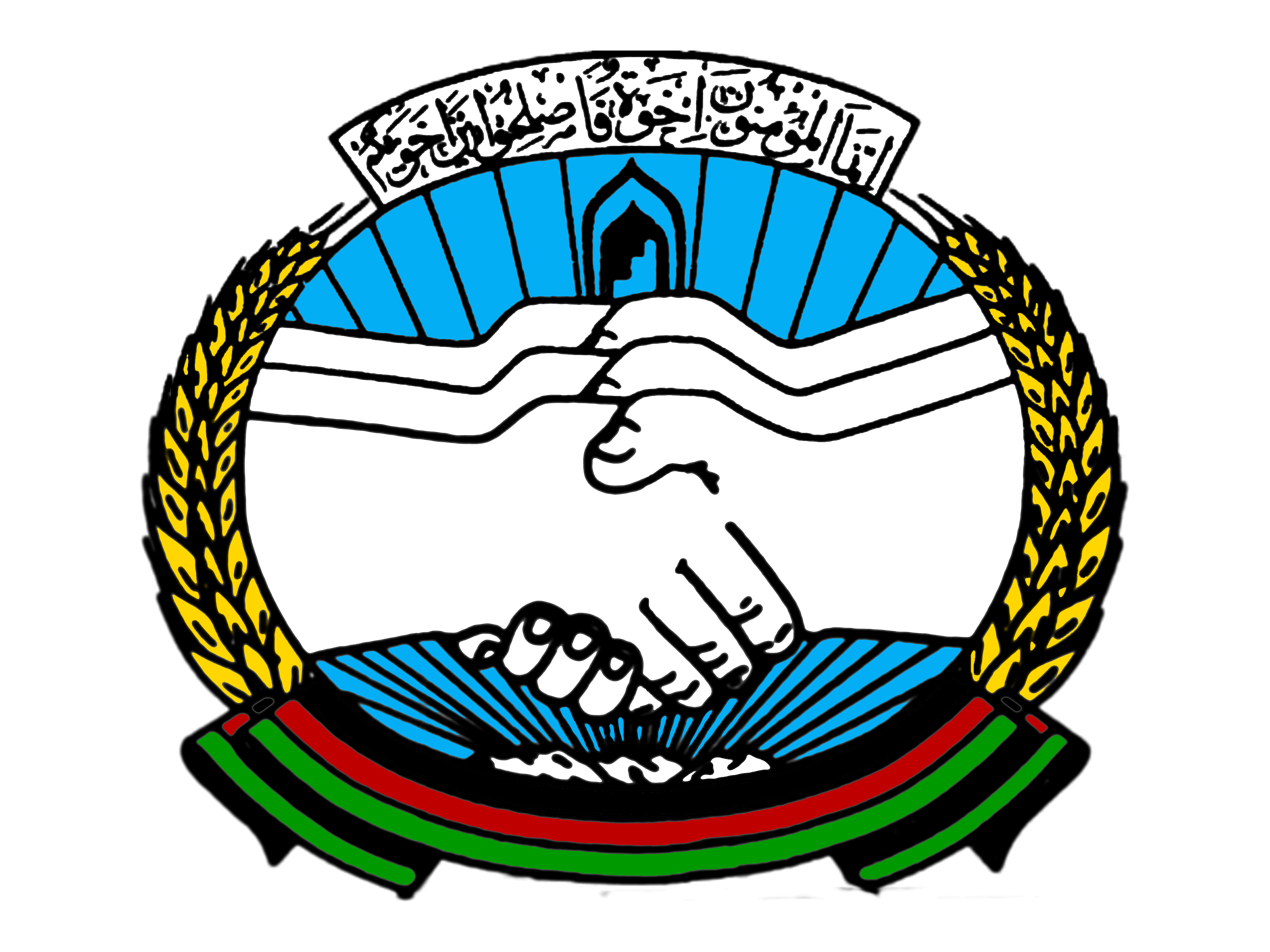
The Emblem of Mohammad Najibullah's Original Homeland Party

After the fall of the Taliban Jabar returned to Helmand opening a tuition center in Lashkargah. The center had a flower garden, taught advanced mathematics, computing, language and science. In 2010, he was elected to the Afghan parliament, where he used his intelligence and charisma to make an impact. Jabar's presence in parliament was notable, as it also included former commanders who had faced each other on opposing frontlines during the 1980s and 1990s.

President Ashraf Ghani recognized Jabar's political acumen and appointed him as a special representative for security in Helmand province. However, his experience in this role challenging as Helmand had become more factionalized then it was in the late 1980s. He later stepped down citing corruption in the government.

In July 2017, Jabar was one of many people who attempted to relaunch Dr Najibullah's Hezb-e Watan (Homeland Party) which had been defunct and officially banned since May 1992. On October 17, 2018, Jaber was assassinated in his office 2 days before the elections. The Taliban claimed responsibility.

== Personal life ==
Jabar was married with one son and two daughters. He was fluent in Pashto, Dari and Russian.

== See also ==
- KHAD
- Nur ul-Haq Ulumi
- Abdul Rashid Dostum
