= Zeenat Karzai =

First Lady of Afghanistan

- Zeenat Karzai in 2005

First Lady of Afghanistan
- In role 22 December 2001 – 29 September 2014
- President: Hamid Karzai
- Preceded by: Fatana Najib; Vacant (1992–2001)
- Succeeded by: Rula Ghani

Personal details
- Born: Zeenat Quraishi; 1970 (age 55–56)
- Spouse: Hamid Karzai (m. 1999)
- Children: 4
- Education: Kabul University
- Religion: Sunni Islam

Zeenat Quraishi Karzai (Pashto: زینت قریشي کرزی) (born 1970) is the wife of former President of Afghanistan Hamid Karzai and was the First Lady of Afghanistan from 2001 to 2014. Originally from the city of Kandahar, she moved to Kabul, where she lived at the Arg (the Presidential palace) with her husband and their four children.

== Education and career ==
Born in 1970 and raised in Kandahar, Afghanistan, the daughter of a civil servant, Zenat Quraishi moved to Kabul after high school to attend Kabul University.

She was a gynaecologist by profession and worked in hospitals treating Afghan refugees in Pakistan before she married Hamid Karzai.

== Family ==
She is an ethnic Pashtun. Zeenat belongs to the Quraish family line and her husband Karzai is from the Popalzai tribe.

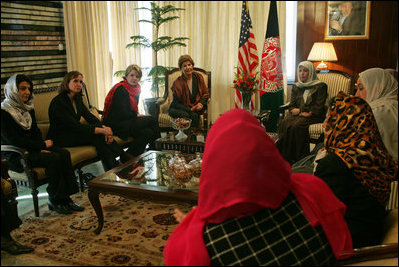
Zeenat Karzai with then U.S. First Lady Laura Bush talking with women.

In 1993, she and her family escaped from the civil war to neighboring Quetta in Balochistan, Pakistan.

She is a distant relative of Hamid Karzai.

They have one son and three daughters.

For a president who has been credited for helping the women of Afghanistan regain their civil rights, Karzai has been criticized for being overly conservative with his own spouse. Many have accused Karzai of keeping the first lady out of the media's reach over fears of criticism from conservative mullahs and religious leaders.

== See also ==
- Rula Ghani
- Queens of Afghanistan
