= Parcham =

Faction of the People's Democratic Party of Afghanistan

Parcham پرچم
- Leader: Babrak Karmal (1967–1986); Mohammad Najibullah (1986–1990)
- Founder: Babrak Karmal
- Founded: June 1967
- Dissolved: 27 June 1990 (36 years, 146 days) (succeeded into Democratic Homeland Party)
- Preceded by: Social Democratic Party of Afghanistan
- Succeeded by: National Islamic Movement of Afghanistan; National United Party of Afghanistan; Democratic Homeland Party
- Membership: ▼ near 10,000 (1977) ▲150,000 (1986 est.)
- Ideology: Afghan nationalism Marxism-Leninism; Progressivism; Secularism; Sovietism
- Political position: Left-wing
- National affiliation: People's Democratic Party of Afghanistan

Party flag

Parcham (Pashto/Dari: پرچم, lit. 'banner' or 'flag') was the more moderate socialist faction of the People's Democratic Party of Afghanistan (PDPA) led by Afghan communist politician Babrak Karmal. It was later turned into the Watan (Homeland) Party of Afghanistan with a more Islamic outlook under Mohammed Najibullah. The faction was formed directly after the founding of the Party in 1965 following ideological splits in the PDPA. While the Parchamites stressed the need for swift social-economic reforms to achieve revolution, this was in direct contrast with their PDPA rivals, the Khalqists, who sought an immediate and violent overthrow of the government. Karmal believed that Afghanistan was not developed enough for a Leninist revolutionary approach and instead sought a patriotic and anti-imperialist united front to take the next steps toward revolution.

== History ==
In 1965, Babrak Karmal and Nur Muhammad Taraki established the People's Democratic Party of Afghanistan. By 1967, the party split into different sects, the largest and most powerful of which were Parcham and Khalq. Despite spawning from the same founding party, they differed in both their ideologies and their bases. While the Khalqists were primarily rural Pashtuns, the Parchamites were supported by middle-class residents of urban city centers, predominantly ethnic Tajiks.

From 1968 to 1969, Parcham published a weekly magazine. This was allowed by King Mohammed Zahir Shah and further divided the two factions, as the Khalqs' newspaper was shuttered by the government in 1966. Because of Parcham's links with the Kingdom of Afghanistan, initially wishing to keep the constitutional monarchy intact, it was derisively referred to as the "Royal Communist Party" by their Khalqist rivals.

The 1973 coup d'état saw heavy support from Parchamites, especially those within the Afghan Army. Following the coup's success, many Parchamites held high-ranking jobs in Mohammed Daoud Khan's government and security forces. However, in the following years, widespread reports of Parchami participation in the death of anti-communist former Primer Minister Mohammad Hashim Maiwandwal led to members of Parcham being purged from Khan's administration and persecuted by his regime.

In 1977, Parcham managed to reconcile with the Khalq faction, and following the Saur Revolution of 1978, many Parchamis were represented in the initial Khalqi government. Very soon after the revolution however, Parchamites were again purged from the government by the hardline leadership of Muhammad Taraki, who strictly opposed their alleged "revisionism", and the regime eventually went into a reign of terror, jailing and executing many Parchamis who were accused of deviating from Marxism-Leninism. The Parcham faction eventually gained power in the country after the overthrowing of Hafizullah Amin in December 1979 by the Soviet Union's Operation Storm-333 intervention, which supported a more moderate and pragmatic leadership. The new government under Parcham leader Babrak Karmal struggled to win popularity after the excesses of the Khalqists, and they were now low in numbers following the mass executions committed by the Khalq regime from 1978 to 1979.

Karmal was replaced by Mohammad Najibullah in 1986 after the Soviet Union voiced discontent about his inability to decisively defeat the Mujahideen, and in June 1990, the Parcham-led PDPA converted itself into the Watan Party (Homeland Party), with all references to Marxism-Leninism removed from the party's manifesto, instead adopting a uniquely Afghan version of Islamic socialism.

The Watan Party was officially banned in Afghanistan on 6 May 1992. There have been numerous attempts to relaunch the party including Mir Afghan Bawary's Watan Party of Afghanistan and General Abdul Jabar Qahraman's Watan Party.
