= List of Afghan royal consorts =

This is a list of the consorts of Afghan rulers. Historically, Afghan rulers, being Muslim, may have several wives, and not always a queen consort.

Afghanistan has only intermittently been a republic – between 1973–1992 and from 2001 onwards – at other times being governed by a variety of kings.

== Consorts of the Hotaki Empire (1709–1738) ==
=== Hotaki Empire ===
Picture	Name	Parents	Birth	Spouse	Marriage	Became consort	Death
	Khanzada Sadozai	Jaffar Khan Sadozai		Mir Wais Hotak			

== Consorts of Durrani Empire (1747–1823) ==
=== Durrani Empire ===
Picture	Name	Parents	Birth	Spouse	Marriage	Became consort	Death
	Hazrat Begum and Iffat-un-Nissa Begum	Mughal Emperor Muhammad Shah		Ahmad Shah Durrani			
	Gauhar-un-Nissa Begum; Maryam Begum; Gauhar Shad Begum; Ayesha Durrani			Timur Shah Durrani			
	Possibly Shako Jan and/or Aziz Bibi	Nur Muhammad Khan		Zaman Shah Durrani			
				Mahmud Shah Durrani			
	Wa'fa Begum	Fath Khan Tokhi		Shah Shujah Durrani			
	Malikdin Khel	Daughter of Khan Bahadur Khan		Shah Shujah Durrani			

== Consorts of Emirate of Afghanistan (1823–1926) ==
=== Emirate of Afghanistan ===
Picture	Name	Parents	Birth	Spouse	Marriage	Reign	Death
	16 wives, among them Mirmon Khadija Popalza			Dost Mohammad Khan			
	Mirmon Ayesha			Sher Ali Khan			
	Asal Begum, Uzbek consort, Babo Jan, etc.			Abdur Rahman Khan			
	44 wives, among them Ulya Janab and Sarwar Sultana Begum.			Habibullah Khan			
Soraya Tarzi	Soraya Tarzi	Mahmud Tarzi & Asma Rasmiya Tarzi	24 November 1899 Damascus, Ottoman Empire	Amānullāh Khān		1919–1929	20 April 1968 (aged 68) Rome, Italy

== Consorts of Kingdom of Afghanistan (1926–1973) ==
=== Kingdom of Afghanistan ===
Picture	Name	Parents	Birth	Spouse	Marriage	Reign	Death
	Khairiya Enayat Seraj	Mahmud Tarzi & Asma Rasmiya Tarzi	1893	Inayatullah Khan	1910		1980, (aged 87), Kabul, Afghanistan
	Mah Parwar Begum	Sardar Muhammad Asif Khan & Murwarid Begum		Mohammed Nadir Shah		1929–1933	13 December 1941 Tehran, Iran
Humaira Begum	Humaira Begum	Sardar Ahmad Shah Khan & Zarin Begum	1918	Mohammed Zahir Shah	1931	1933–1973	26 June 2002 (aged 83–84) Rome, Italy

== See also ==
- First Lady of Afghanistan
- List of presidents of Afghanistan
- President of Afghanistan
