= Haji Mohammad Chamkani =

Afghan politician (1920–2012)

Haji Mohammad Tsamkani
- حاجي محمد څمکنی

Acting Chairman of the Presidium of the Revolutionary Council
- In office 24 November 1986 – 30 September 1987
- Premier: Sultan Ali Keshtmand
- Preceded by: Babrak Karmal
- Succeeded by: Mohammad Najibullah

Personal details
- Born: 1919 Chamkani, Emirate of Afghanistan
- Died: 2012 (aged 92–93) Peshawar, Pakistan
- Party: Independent

Haji Mohammad Tsamkani (Pashto: حاجي محمد څمکنی; Dari: حاجی محمد چمکنی; 1920–2012) was an Afghan politician who was a Pashtun and held the post of interim President of Afghanistan during the period of the Soviet-backed Democratic Republic of Afghanistan. Previously, he served as deputy head of state aka vice chairman of the Presidium of the Revolutionary Council under Babrak Karmal.

He reached the position after the resignation of Babrak Karmal. A non-party member, a tribal leader with power and connections in key areas of provinces bordering Pakistan, his influence extended inside Pakistan as well. However, Mohammed Najibullah was in charge of the country, due to his powerful positions of Director of the KHAD and General Secretary of the People's Democratic Party of Afghanistan. It was during his term in office that the Soviet Union indicated willingness to negotiate and remove some troops from Afghanistan. His term was also marked by the creation of a new Constitution.

Political offices
Preceded by Gul Aqa	Vice Chairman of the Revolutionary Council; November 1986 - April 1988	Succeeded by Several vice presidents
Preceded by Babrak Karmal	Chairman of the Presidium of the Revolutionary Council; 1986 – 1987	Succeeded by Mohammad Najibullah
