= National Reconciliation (Afghanistan) =

Najibullah-era policy of the Democratic Republic of Afghanistan

National Reconciliation is the term used for establishment of so-called 'national unity' in countries beset with political problems. In Afghanistan the People's Democratic Party of Afghanistan government under Babrak Karmal issued a ten-point reconciliation program in 1985 upon the advice of Soviet leadership, called the National Reconciliation Policy or NRP.

== Creation ==
Karmal appointed a six-member group of people who were not political party members to develop the National Reconciliation Policy. Mohammad Najibullah later intensified and broadened the proposals in 1987 to stop the Afghan Civil War which had continued since 1978 after the Saur Revolution. At the National Reconciliation meeting they came to the conclusion that the Soviet Armed Forces in Afghanistan should withdraw.

In addition to ending the armed conflict with the Mujahideen and the integration of the Mujahideen into a multi-party political process and the withdrawal of Soviet Union security forces, the development of a new constitution was proposed as a component of the National Reconciliation Policy.

In 1985 Mikhail Gorbachev was appointed General Secretary of the Communist Party of the Soviet Union. Gorbachev pushed new Afghan president Mohammad Najibullah to come with a peace proposal in the Democratic Republic of Afghanistan. On 15 January 1987, Najibullah requested a six-month ceasefire between Mujahideen and government forces, and made other proposals as part of the National Reconciliation Policy. The resistance replied to these proposals at a general meeting in Ghor Province in July 1987. The meeting was called together by Mujahideen resistance leader Ismail Khan in Herat Province. Najibullah's proposal was rejected and the six-month ceasefire agreement ended.

== Government–Mujahideen negotiations ==
Peace processes used to negotiate between government and Mujahideen included non-aggression or other peace agreements with local commanders, discussion of the proposed agreements at district level, and proposals such as disarmament, demobilization and reintegration of fighters into their local communities. The 1988 Geneva Accords did not set rules for political processes linked with these local peace arrangements; it was limited to withdrawal of Soviet forces from Afghanistan.

By 1991, National Reconciliation Policy negotiations had made progress. Factors creating difficulties included Afghan distrust for Najibullah as a former head of the Afghan intelligence agency; support by regional and global powers for exiled opposition leaders; and the time scale needed for peace and reconciliation processes.

== The new constitution ==
Under Najibullah's leadership a new constitution was ratified by the Loya jirga in 1987. The new constitution abolished the one-party system in the country and saw the establishment of the Meli Shura (Loya jirga), Sena (Senate) and the Wolasi Jirga (House of Representatives) which would eventually replace the Revolutionary Council which had been the ruling organ since the PDPA's establishment in 1965. The word "Democratic" was also removed from the country's official name, and since 1987 the official name of the country was the Republic of Afghanistan. Islam became the official state religion again after the talks.
