= Babo Jan =

Late 19th-century Afghan royal consort

Mirmon Halima, also known as Babo Jan or Bobo Jan (fl. 1880), was an Afghan royal consort. She was married to Abdur Rahman Khan (r. 1880–1901).

== Biography ==
She was a granddaughter of Amir Dost Mohammed Khan, a former ruler of Afghanistan who was also Abdur Rahman's grandfather.

She was one of the many wives of the king. It was the custom of the monarch to have four official wives and a large number of unofficial wives as well as slave concubines in the harem of the royal Palace complex in Kabul. She was however his favorite wife, and came to influence him and the affairs of state.

She acted as his adviser and was assigned by him the task to represent him on diplomatic missions as the mediator during clan and tribal conflicts, and as such made trips around Afghanistan with his permission to undertake such tasks. To act as a mediator in this way was acceptable for a royal woman, and had a predecessor in Zarghona Anaa a century before; but it was by no means a given thing, but rather testifies to the great confidence she was given by her spouse. Reportedly, she was able to ride a horse (not a given thing for a woman at this time and place) and had her enslaved maidservants trained in military self defense.

Babo Jan was described as wise and patriotic. She was known to write poetry, which was common for royal and aristocratic women of the harem.

== Sources ==
- M. Saed: Women in Afghanistan history
- Canadian Women for Women in Afghanistan. Afghan Women in History:The 20th Century
