= Mohammad Najibullah =

Leader of Afghanistan from 1987 to 1992

- محمد نجیب‌الله احمدزی
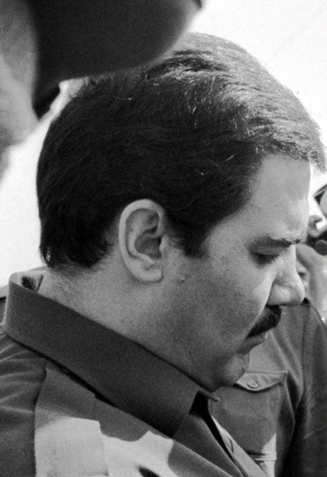
- Najibullah in 1986

Leader of Watan Party of Afghanistan
- In office June 1990 – 6 May 1992

General Secretary of the People's Democratic Party of Afghanistan
- In office 4 May 1986 – 16 April 1992
- Preceded by: Babrak Karmal
- Succeeded by: Position abolished

2nd President of Afghanistan
- In office 30 November 1987 – 16 April 1992
- Premier: Sultan Ali Keshtmand; Mohammad Hasan Sharq; Fazal Haq Khaliqyar
- Vice President: Abdul Rahim Hatif; Mohammed Rafie; Abdul Hamid Mohtat; Abdul Wahed Sorabi; Sultan Ali Keshtmand; Mohammed Eshaq Tokhi
- Preceded by: Himself (as Chairman of the Presidium of the Revolutionary Council)
- Succeeded by: Abdul Rahim Hatif (acting); Burhanuddin Rabbani

Chairman of the Presidium of the Revolutionary Council
- In office 30 September 1987 – 30 November 1987
- Preceded by: Haji Mohammad Chamkani
- Succeeded by: Himself (as president)

Director of the State Information Service
- In office 11 January 1980 – 21 November 1985
- Leader: Babrak Karmal (as General Secretary)
- Preceded by: Assadullah Amin
- Succeeded by: Ghulam Faruq Yaqubi

Personal details
- Born: 6 August 1947 Gardez, Afghanistan
- Died: 27 September 1996 (aged 49) Kabul, Afghanistan
- Cause of death: Assassination by gunshot
- Resting place: Gardez, Paktia, Afghanistan
- Party: PDPA (Parcham); Watan Party (from 1990)
- Spouse: Fatana Najib (m. 1974)
- Children: 3
- Education: Habibia High School; SJS Baramulla
- Awards: Domestic: Hero of the Republic of Afghanistan; Order of the Sun of Freedom; Order of the Red Banner (Afghanistan); Order of the Saur Revolution; Order of Friendship of Peoples (Afghanistan); Order For Gallantry (Afghanistan); Foreign: Order of José Marti; Order of Friendship of Peoples

Military service
- Allegiance: Democratic Republic of Afghanistan (1978–1987); Republic of Afghanistan (1987–1992)
- Branch/service: Afghan Army; KHAD
- Years of service: 1980–1992
- Rank: General
- Battles/wars: Soviet–Afghan War; Afghan Civil War (1989–1992)
- Top Leader: ← Karmal; (Last in role) →

Mohammad Najibullah Ahmadzai (Note: Pashto: محمد نجيب الله احمدزی, romanized: Muhammad Najibullāh Ahmadzai, [mu.wa.mad̪/mu.ham.mad̪ na.d͡ʒi.bu(l).lɑ(h) ʔɑ.mad̪.zaɪ/ʔah.mad̪.zaɪ]; Dari: محمد نجیب‌الله احمدزی, romanized: Mohammad Najibullāh Ahmadzay, [mʊ.wäm.mád̪/mo̞.ɦäm.mád̪ nä.d͡ʒíː.bʊl.lɑ́ː(ʱ) ʔɑː.mäd̪.záj/ʔäɦ.mäd̪.záj]) (6 August 1947 – 27 September 1996) was an Afghan military officer and politician who served as the fifth president of Afghanistan from 1987 until his resignation in April 1992, shortly after the Afghan mujahideen's takeover of Kabul. He was also the General Secretary of the People's Democratic Party of Afghanistan (PDPA) from 1986 to 1992. After a failed attempt to flee to India, Najibullah remained in Kabul, and lived in the United Nations headquarters until his assassination during the Taliban's first capture of Kabul in 1996.

A graduate of Kabul University, Najibullah held different careers under the PDPA. Following the Saur Revolution and the establishment of the Democratic Republic of Afghanistan, Najibullah was a low-profile bureaucrat. He was sent into exile as Ambassador to Iran during Hafizullah Amin's rise to power. He returned to Afghanistan following the Soviet intervention which toppled Amin's rule and placed Babrak Karmal as head of the state, the party and the government. During Karmal's rule, Najibullah became head of the KHAD, the Afghan equivalent of the Soviet KGB. He was a member of the Parcham faction led by Karmal. During Najibullah's tenure as KHAD head, it became one of the most brutally efficient governmental organs. Because of this, he gained the attention of several leading Soviet officials, such as Yuri Andropov, Dmitriy Ustinov and Boris Ponomarev. In 1981, Najibullah was appointed to the PDPA Politburo. In 1985, Najibullah stepped down as the state security minister to focus on PDPA politics; he had been appointed to the PDPA Secretariat. Soviet General Secretary Mikhail Gorbachev, also the last Soviet leader, was able to get Karmal to step down as PDPA General Secretary in 1986, and replace him with Najibullah. For a number of months, Najibullah was locked in a power struggle against Karmal, who still retained his post of Chairman of the Revolutionary Council. Najibullah accused Karmal of trying to wreck his policy of National Reconciliation, a series of efforts by Najibullah to end the conflict.

During his tenure as leader of Afghanistan, the Soviets began their withdrawal, and from 1989 until 1992, his government tried to solve the ongoing civil war without Soviet troops on the ground. While direct Soviet assistance ended with the withdrawal, the Soviet Union still supported Najibullah with economic and military aid, while Pakistan and the United States continued their support for the mujahideen. Throughout his tenure, he tried to build support for his government via the National Reconciliation reforms by distancing from socialism in favour of Afghan nationalism, abolishing the one-party state and letting non-communists join the government. He remained open to dialogue with the mujahideen and other groups, made Islam an official religion, and invited exiled businessmen back to re-take their properties. In the 1990 constitution, all references to communism were removed and Islam became the state religion. For various reasons, such changes did not win Najibullah any significant support. Following the August Coup in Moscow and the dissolution of the Soviet Union in December 1991, Najibullah was left without foreign aid. This, coupled with the internal collapse of his government (following the defection of general Abdul Rashid Dostum), led to his resignation in April 1992. In 1996, he was tortured and killed by the Taliban.

In 2017, the pro-Najibullah Watan Party was created as a continuation of Najibullah's party. Najibullah's legacy remains mixed as supporters laud him for his democratic efforts while critics cite the various human rights abuses during his tenure as head of the KHAD as well as alleged corruption under his government.

== Early life and career ==
Najibullah (second from right) among other communist PDPA members Nur Ahmed Nur, Nur Muhammad Taraki and Babrak Karmal at the funeral of former Parcham leader Mir Akbar Khyber in Kabul on 19 April 1978.

Najibullah was born on 6 August 1947 in the city of Gardez in the Paktia Province of the Kingdom of Afghanistan. His ancestral village of Najibqilla is located between the towns of Gardez and Said Karam, in an area known as Mehlan. He belonged to the Ahmadzai clan (Khel) of the Ghilji tribe of Pashtuns.

Najibullah was educated at Habibia High School in Kabul, at St. Joseph's Higher Secondary School in Baramulla, Jammu and Kashmir, India, and at Kabul University where he began studying in 1964 and completed his Bachelor of Medicine, Bachelor of Surgery in 1975; however, he never practiced medicine.

In 1965, during his study in Kabul, Najibullah joined the Parcham (Banner) faction of the People's Democratic Party of Afghanistan (PDPA) and was twice imprisoned for political activities. He served as Babrak Karmal's close associate and bodyguard during the latter's tenure in the lower house of parliament (1965–1973).

In 1977, Najibullah was elected to the Central Committee. On 27 April 1978, the PDPA took power in Afghanistan (Saur Revolution), with Najibullah a member of the ruling Revolutionary Council; however, the Khalq (People's) faction of the PDPA gained supremacy over his own Parcham (Banner) faction, and after a brief stint as Ambassador to Iran, he was dismissed from government and went into exile in Europe, until the Soviet Union intervened in 1979 and supported a Parcham-dominated government.

== Under Karmal: 1979–1986 ==
=== Minister of State Security: 1980–1985 ===
In 1980, Najibullah was appointed the head of KHAD, the Afghan equivalent to the Soviet KGB, and was promoted to the rank of Major General. He was appointed following lobbying from the Soviets, including Yuri Andropov, then KGB Chairman. During his six years as head of KHAD he had two to four deputies under his command, who in turn were responsible for an estimated 12 departments. According to evidence, Najibullah was dependent on his family and his professional network, and more often than not appointed people he knew to top positions within the KHAD. In June 1981, Najibullah, along with Mohammad Aslam Watanjar, a former tank commander and the then Minister of Communications and Major General Mohammad Rafi, the Minister of Defence were appointed to the PDPA Politburo.

Under Najibullah, KHAD's personnel increased from 120 to 25,000 to 30,000. KHAD employees were amongst the best-paid government bureaucrats in communist Afghanistan, and because of it, the political indoctrination of KHAD officials was a top priority. During a PDPA conference, Najibullah, talking about the indoctrination programme of KHAD officials, said "a weapon in one hand, a book in the other." Counter-insurgency activities launched by KHAD reached its peak under Najibullah. He reported directly to the Soviet KGB, and a big part of KHAD's budget came from the Soviet Union itself. As the head of KHAD, Najibullah was also involved in the planning of the hijacking of Pakistan International Airlines Flight 326 with Murtaza Bhutto.

As time would show, Najibullah was very efficient, and during his tenure as leader of KHAD, thousands were arrested, tortured, and executed. KHAD targeted anti-communist citizens, political opponents, and educated members of society. It was this efficiency which made him interesting to the Soviets. Because of this, KHAD became known for its ruthlessness. During his ascension to power, several Afghan politicians did not want Najibullah to succeed Babrak Karmal because Najibullah was known for exploiting his powers for his own benefit. Additionally, during his period as KHAD chief, the Pul-i Charki had become the home of several Khalqist politicians. Another problem was that Najibullah allowed graft, theft, bribery and corruption on a scale not seen previously. As would later be proven by the power struggle he had with Karmal after becoming PDPA General Secretary, despite Najibullah heading the KHAD for five years, Karmal still had sizeable support in the Parcham faction leading to Najibullah relying more on Khalqists.

=== Rise to power: 1985–1986 ===
He was appointed to the PDPA Secretariat in November 1985. Najibullah's ascent to power was proven by turning KHAD from a government organ to a ministry in January 1986. With the situation in Afghanistan deteriorating, and the Soviet leadership looking for ways to withdraw, Mikhail Gorbachev wanted Karmal to resign as PDPA General Secretary. The question of who was to succeed Karmal was hotly debated, but Gorbachev supported Najibullah. Yuri Andropov, Boris Ponomarev and Dmitriy Ustinov all thought highly of Najibullah, and negotiations of who would succeed Karmal might have begun as early as 1983. Despite this, Najibullah was not the only choice the Soviets had. A GRU report argued that he was a Pashtun nationalist, a stance which could decrease the regime's popularity even more. The GRU preferred Assadullah Sarwari, earlier head of ASGA, the pre-KHAD secret police, who they believed would be better able to balance between the Pashtuns, Tajiks and Uzbeks. Another viable candidate was Abdul Qadir, who had been a participant in the Saur Revolution. Najibullah succeeded Karmal as PDPA General Secretary on 4 May 1986 at the 18th PDPA meeting, but Karmal still retained his post as Chairman of the Presidium of the Revolutionary Council.

On 15 May, Najibullah announced that a collective leadership had been established, which was led by himself consisted of himself as head of party, Karmal as head of state and Sultan Ali Keshtmand as Chairman of the Council of Ministers. When Najibullah took the office of PDPA General Secretary, Karmal still had enough support in the party to disgrace Najibullah. Karmal went as far as to spread rumours that Najibullah's rule was little more than an interregnum, and that he would soon be reappointed to the general secretaryship. As it turned out, Karmal's power base during this period was KHAD. The Soviet leadership wanted to ease Karmal out of politics, but when Najibullah began to complain that he was hampering his plans of National Reconciliation, the Soviet Politburo decided to remove Karmal; this motion was supported by Andrei Gromyko, Yuli Vorontsov, Eduard Shevardnadze, Anatoly Dobrynin and Viktor Chebrikov. A meeting in the PDPA in November relieved Karmal of his Revolutionary Council chairmanship, and he was exiled to Moscow where he was given a state-owned apartment and a dacha. In his position as Revolutionary Council chairman Karmal was succeeded by Haji Mohammad Chamkani, who was not a member of the PDPA.

In 1986, there were more than 100,000 political prisoners and there had been more than 16,500 extrajudicial executions. Its main objectives were the opponents of communism and the most educated classes in society.

== Leader: 1986–1992 ==
=== National Reconciliation ===
Najibullah at the Belgrade Conference in 1989

In September 1986, the National Compromise Commission (NCC) was established on the orders of Najibullah. The NCC's goal was to contact counter-revolutionaries "in order to complete the Saur Revolution in its new phase." Allegedly, an estimated 40,000 rebels were contacted by the government. At the end of 1986, Najibullah called for a six-months ceasefire and talks between the various opposition forces, this was part of his policy of National Reconciliation. The discussions, if fruitful, would lead to the establishment of a coalition government and be the end of the PDPA's monopoly of power. The programme failed, but the government was able to recruit disillusioned mujahideen fighters as government militias. A number of prominent Mujahideen commanders defected to the government, such as Ismatullah Muslim in Kandahar, Fazal Ahmad in Herat, and Juma Khan in Andarab with a large number of their followers in exchange for cash. Many more Mujahideen joined the government's tribal militias, some of them being incorporated into the Afghan Army as divisions. In many ways, the National Reconciliation led to an increasing number of urban dwellers to support his rule, and the stabilisation of the Afghan Armed Forces.

In September 1986, a new constitution was written, which was adopted on 29 November 1987. The constitution weakened the powers of the head of state by cancelling his absolute veto. The reason for this move, according to Najibullah, was the need for real-power sharing. On 13 July 1987, the official name of Afghanistan was changed from the Democratic Republic of Afghanistan to Republic of Afghanistan, and in June 1988 the Revolutionary Council, whose members were elected by the party leadership, was replaced by a National Assembly, an organ in which members were to be elected by the people. The PDPA's socialist stance was denied even more than previously, in 1989 the Minister of Higher Education began to work on the "de-Sovietisation" of universities, and in 1990 it was even announced by a party member that all PDPA members were Muslims and that the party had abandoned Marxism. Many parts of the Afghan government's economic monopoly was also broken, this had more to do with the tight situation than any ideological conviction. Abdul Hakim Misaq, the Mayor of Kabul, even stated that traffickers of stolen goods would not be prosecuted by law as long as their goods were given to the market. Yuli Vorontsov, on Gorbachev's orders, was able to get an agreement with the PDPA leadership to offer the posts of Gossoviet chairman (the state planning organ), the Council of Ministers chairmanship (head of government), ministries of defence, state security, communications, finance, presidencies of banks and the Supreme Court. The PDPA still demanded it held on to all deputy ministers, retained its majority in the state bureaucracy and that it retained all its provincial governors. The government was not willing to concede all of these positions, and when the offer was broadcast, the ministries of defence and state security.

==== Elections: 1987 and 1988 ====
Local elections were held in 1987. It began when the government introduced a law permitting the formation of other political parties, announced that it would be prepared to share power with representatives of opposition groups in the event of a coalition government, and issued a new constitution providing for a new bicameral National Assembly (Meli Shura), consisting of a Senate (Sena) and a House of Representatives (Wolesi Jirga), and a president to be indirectly elected to a 7-year term. The new political parties had to oppose colonialism, imperialism, neo-colonialism, Zionism, racial discrimination, apartheid and fascism. Najibullah stated that only the extremist part of the opposition could not join the planned coalition government. No parties had to share the PDPA's policy or ideology, but they could not oppose the bond between Afghanistan and the Soviet Union. A parliamentary election was held in 1988. The PDPA won 46 seats in the House of Representatives and controlled the government with support from the National Front, which won 45 seats, and from various newly recognized left-wing parties, which had won a total of 24 seats. Although the election was boycotted by the Mujahideen, the government left 50 of the 234 seats in the House of Representatives, as well as a small number of seats in the Senate, vacant in the hope that the guerrillas would end their armed struggle and participate in the government. The only armed opposition party to make peace with the government was Hizbollah, a small Shi'a party not to be confused with the bigger party in Iran or the Lebanese organization.

=== Emergency ===
Several figures of the intelligentsia took Najibullah's offer seriously, even if they sympathised or were against the regime. Their hopes were dampened when the Najibullah government introduced the state of emergency on 18 February 1989, four days after the Soviet withdrawal due to a mujahideen offensive starting to take shape in Nangarhar Province, later leading to the Battle of Jalalabad. 1,700 intellectuals were arrested in February alone, and until November 1991 the government still supervised and restricted freedom of speech. Another problem was that party members took his policy seriously too, Najibullah recanted that most party members felt "panic and pessimism". At the Second Conference of the party, the majority of members, maybe up to 60 percent, were radical socialists. According to Soviet advisors (in 1987), a bitter debate within the party had broken out between those who advocated the Islamisation of the party and those who wanted to defend the gains of the Saur Revolution. Opposition to his policy of National Reconciliation was met party-wide, but especially from Karmalists. Many people did not support the handing out of the already small state resources the Afghan state had at its disposal. On the other side, several members were proclaiming anti-Soviet slogans as they accused the National Reconciliation programme to be supported and developed by the Soviet Union. Najibullah reassured the inter-party opposition that he would not give up the gains of the Saur Revolution, but to the contrary, preserve them, not give up the PDPA's monopoly on power, or to collaborate with reactionary Mullahs.

==== An Islamic state ====
During Babrak Karmal's later years, and during Najibullah's tenure, the PDPA tried to improve their standing with Muslims by moving, or appearing to move, to the political centre. They wanted to create a new image for the party and state. Communist symbols were either replaced or removed. These measures did not contribute to any notable increase in support for the government, because the mujahideen had a stronger legitimacy to protect Islam than the government; they had rebelled against what they saw as an anti-Islamic government, that government was the PDPA. Islamic principles were embedded in the 1987 constitution, for instance, Article 2 of the constitution stated that Islam was the state religion, and Article 73 stated that the head of state had to be born into a Muslim Afghan family. The 1990 constitution stated that Afghanistan was an Islamic state, and the last references to communism were removed. Article 1 of the 1990 Constitution said that Afghanistan was an "independent, unitary and Islamic state." In 1990, Najibullah abolished the Democratic Women's Organisation of Afghanistan, eradicating their Marxist rhetoric as early as 1986, and replaced it with the apolitical Afghan Women's Council, which is still in existence.

In 1992, Najibullah appealed to the United States to help Afghanistan become a bulwark against the spread of Islamic fundamentalism. He said: "If fundamentalism comes to Afghanistan, war will continue for many more years. Afghanistan will turn into a centre of world smuggling for narcotic drugs. Afghanistan will be turned into a centre for terrorism".

=== Economic policies ===
Najibullah continued Karmal's economic policies. The augmenting of links with the Eastern Bloc and the Soviet Union continued, and so did bilateral trade. He encouraged the development of the private sector in industry. The Five-Year Economic and Social Development Plan which was introduced in January 1986 continued until March 1992, one month before the government's fall. According to the plan, the economy, which had grown less than 2 percent annually until 1985, would grow 25 percent in the plan. Industry would grow 28 percent, agriculture 14–16 percent, domestic trade by 150 percent and foreign trade with 15 percent. As expected, none of these targets were met, and 2 percent growth annually which had been the norm before the plan continued under Najibullah. The 1990 constitution gave due attention to the private sector. Article 20 was about the establishment of private firms, and Article 25 encouraged foreign investments in the private sector.

=== Afghan–Soviet relations ===
==== Soviet withdrawal ====
While he may have been the de jure leader of Afghanistan, Soviet advisers still did the majority of work when Najibullah took power. As Gorbachev remarked "We're still doing everything ourselves [...]. That's all our people know how to do. They've tied Najibullah hand and foot." Fikryat Tabeev, the Soviet ambassador to Afghanistan, was accused of acting like a governor general by Gorbachev. Tabeev was recalled from Afghanistan in July 1986, but while Gorbachev called for the end of Soviet management of Afghanistan, he could not help but to do some managing himself. At a Soviet Politburo meeting, Gorbachev said "It's difficult to build a new building out of old material [...] I hope to God that we haven't made a mistake with Najibullah." As time would prove, the problem was that Najibullah's aims were the opposite of the Soviet Union's; Najibullah was opposed to a Soviet withdrawal, the Soviet Union wanted a Soviet withdrawal. This was logical, considering the fact that the Afghan military was on the brink of dissolution. The only means of survival seemed to Najibullah was to retain the Soviet presence. In July 1986 six regiments, which consisted up to 15,000 troops, were withdrawn from Afghanistan. The aim of this early withdrawal was, according to Gorbachev, to show the world that the Soviet leadership was serious about leaving Afghanistan. The Soviets told the United States Government that they were planning to withdraw, but the United States Government did not believe them. When Gorbachev met with Ronald Reagan during his visit the United States, Reagan called for the dissolution of the Afghan army.

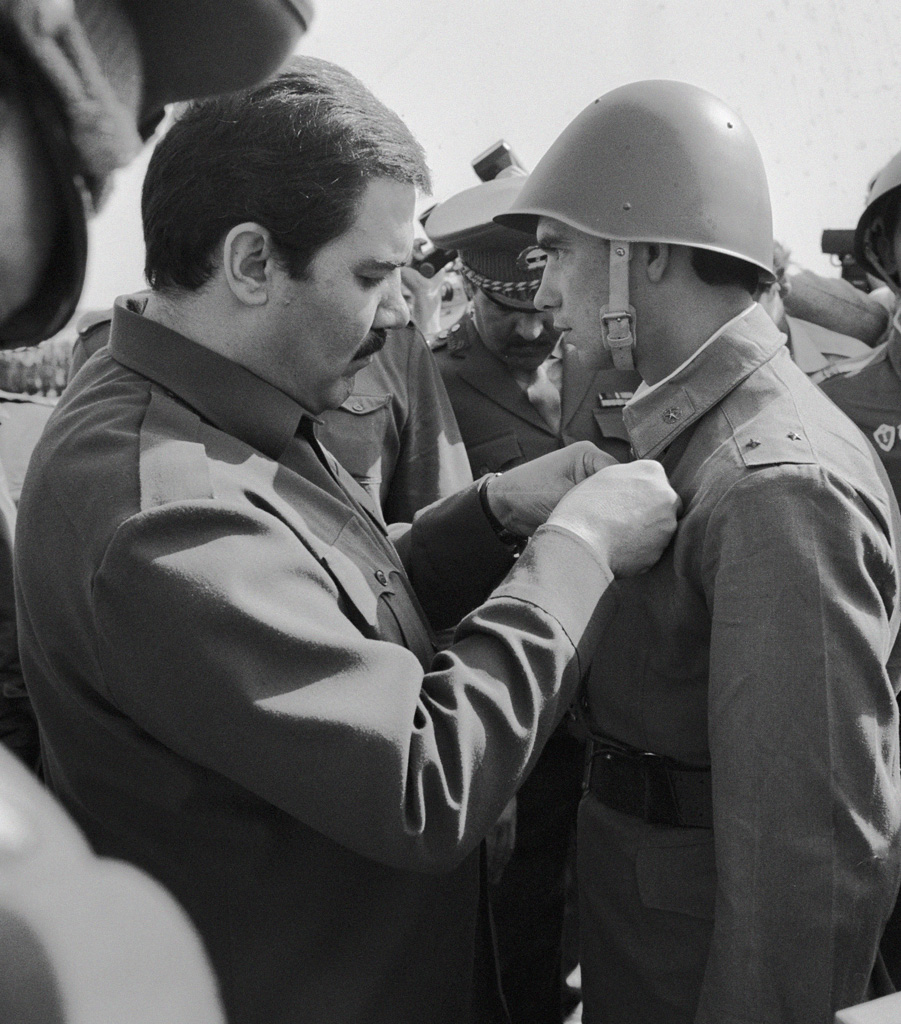
Najibullah giving a decoration to a Soviet serviceman in 1986

On 14 April 1988, the Afghan and Pakistani governments signed the Geneva Accords, and the Soviet Union and the United States signed as guarantors; the treaty specifically stated that the Soviet military had to withdraw from Afghanistan by 15 February 1989. Gorbachev later confided to Anatoly Chernyaev, a personal advisor to Gorbachev, that the Soviet withdrawal would be criticised for creating a bloodbath which could have been averted if the Soviets stayed. During a Politburo meeting Eduard Shevardnadze said "We will leave the country in a deplorable situation", and further talked about the economic collapse, and the need to keep at least 10 to 15,000 troops in Afghanistan. In this Vladimir Kryuchkov, the KGB Chairman, supported him. This stance, if implemented, would be a betrayal of the Geneva Accords just signed. During the second phase of the Soviet withdrawal, in 1989, Najibullah told Valentin Varennikov openly that he would do everything to slow down the Soviet departure. Varennikov in turn replied that such a move would not help, and would only lead to an international outcry against the war. Najibullah would repeat his position later that year, to a group of senior Soviet representatives in Kabul. This time Najibullah stated that Ahmad Shah Massoud was the main problem, and that he needed to be killed. In this, the Soviets agreed, but repeated that such a move would be a breach of the Geneva Accords; to hunt for Ahmad Shah Massoud so early on would disrupt the withdrawal, and would mean that the Soviet Union would fail to meet its deadline for withdrawal.

During his January 1989 visit to Shevardnadze, Najibullah wanted to retain a small presence of Soviet troops in Afghanistan, and called for moving Soviet bombers to military bases close to the Afghan–Soviet border and place them on permanent alert. Najibullah also repeated his claims that his government could not survive if Ahmad Shah Massoud remained alive. Shevardnadze again repeated that troops could not stay, since it would lead to international outcry, but said he would look into the matter. Shevardnadze demanded that the Soviet embassy created a plan in which at least 12,000 Soviet troops would remain in Afghanistan either under direct control of the United Nations or remain as "volunteers". The Soviet military leadership, when hearing of Shevardnadze's plan, became furious. But they followed orders, and named the operation Typhoon, maybe ironic considering that Operation Typhoon was the German military operation against the city of Moscow during World War II. Shevardnadze contacted the Soviet leadership about moving a unit to break the siege of Kandahar, and to protect convoys from and to the city. The Soviet leadership were against Shevardnadze's plan, and Chernyaev even believed it was part of Najibullah's plan to keep Soviet troops in the country. To which Shevardnadze replied angrily "You've not been there, [...] You've no idea all the things we have done there in the past ten years." At a Politburo meeting on 24 January, Shevardnadze argued that the Soviet leadership could not be indifferent to Najibullah and his government; again, Shevardnadze received support from Kryuchkov. In the end Shevardnadze lost the debate, and the Politburo reaffirmed their commitment to withdraw from Afghanistan. There was still a small presence of Soviet troops after the Soviet withdrawal; for instance, parachutists who protected the Soviet embassy staff, military advisors and special forces and reconnaissance troops still operated in the "outlying provinces", especially along the Afghan–Soviet border.

==== Aid ====
Soviet military aid continued after their withdrawal, and massive quantities of food, fuel, ammunition and military equipment was given to the government. Varennikov visited Afghanistan in May 1989 to discuss ways and means to deliver the aid to the government. In 1990, Soviet aid amounted to an estimated 3 billion United States dollars. As it turned out, the Afghan military was entirely dependent on Soviet aid to function. When the Soviet Union was dissolved on 26 December 1991, Najibullah turned to former Soviet Central Asia for aid. These newly independent states had no wish to see Afghanistan being taken over by religious fundamentalists, and supplied Afghanistan with 6 million barrels of oil and 500,000 tons of wheat to survive the winter.

=== After the Soviets ===
With the Soviets' withdrawal in 1989, the Afghan army was left on its own to battle the insurgents. The most effective, and largest, assaults on the mujahideen were undertaken during the 1985–86 period. These offensives had forced the mujahideen on the defensive near Herat and Kandahar. The Soviets ensued a bomb and negotiate during 1986, and a major offensive that year included 10,000 Soviet troops and 8,000 Afghan troops.

The Pakistani people and establishment continued to support the Afghan mujahideen even if it was in contravention of the Geneva Accords. At the beginning, most observers expected the Najibullah government to collapse immediately, and to be replaced with an Islamic fundamentalist government. The Central Intelligence Agency stated in a report that the new government would be ambivalent, or even hostile towards the United States. Almost immediately after the Soviet withdrawal, the Battle of Jalalabad broke out between Afghan government forces and the mujahideen, in cooperation with Pakistan's Inter-Service Intelligence (ISI). The offensive against the city began when the mujahideen bribed several government military officers, from there, they tried to take the airport, but were repulsed with heavy casualties. The willingness of the common Afghan government soldier to fight increased when the mujahideen began to execute people during the battle. Hamid Gul, leader of the ISI, hoped that the battle would topple Najibullah's government and create a mujahideen government seated in Jalalabad. During the battle, Najibullah called for Soviet assistance. Gorbachev called an emergency session of the Politburo to discuss his proposal, but Najibullah's request was rejected. Other attacks against the city failed, and by April the government forces were on the offensive. During the battle over four hundred Scud missiles were shot, which were fired by a Soviet crew, which had stayed behind, in joint cooperation with the Afghan 99th Missile Brigade. When the battle ended in July, the mujahideen had lost an estimated 3,000 troops. One mujahideen commander lamented "the battle of Jalalabad lost us credit won in ten years of fighting." After the mujahideen's defeat in Jalalabad, Gul blamed the administration of Pakistani Prime Minister Benazir Bhutto for the defeat. Bhutto eventually sacked Gul.

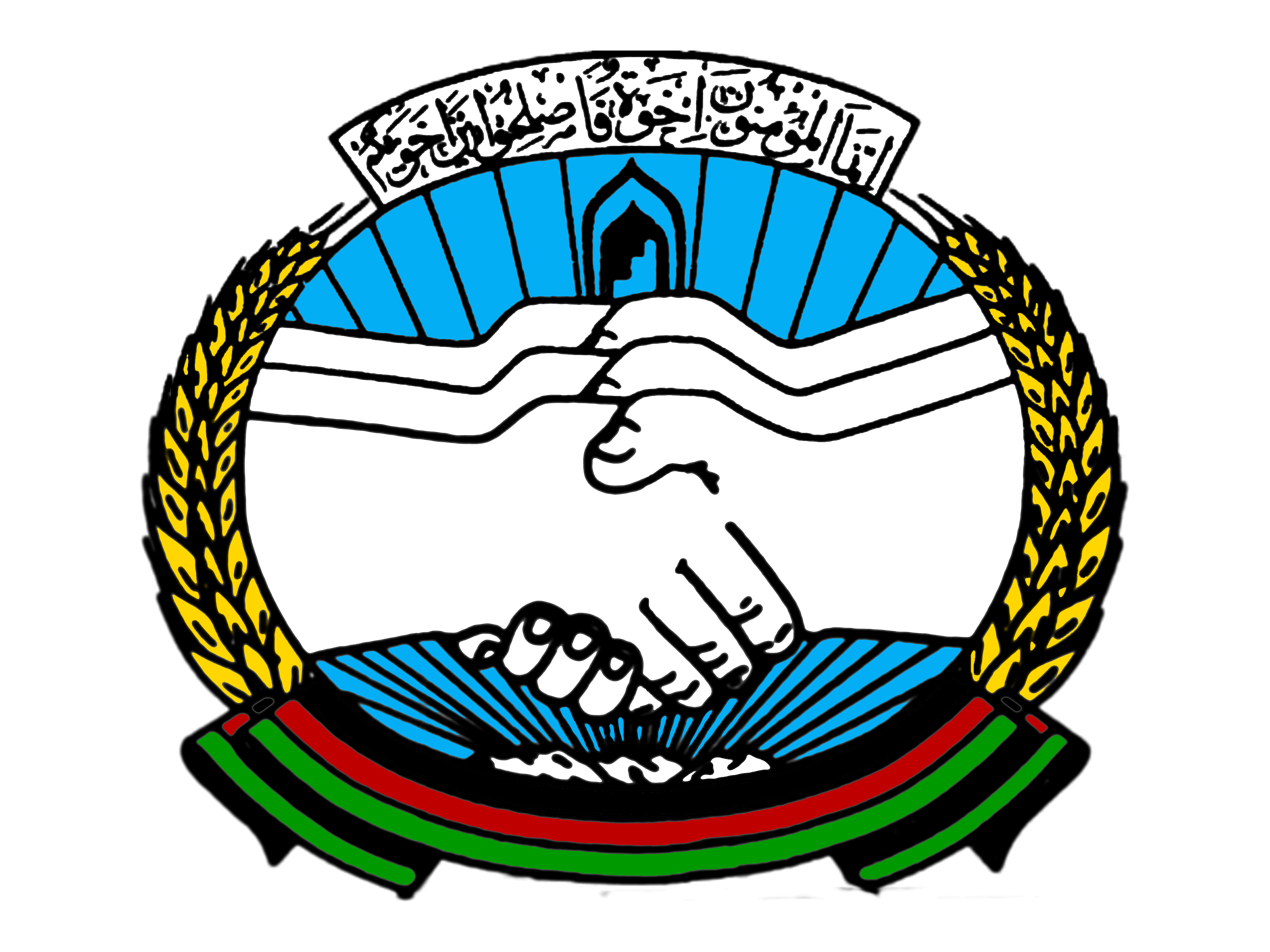
In 1990, Najibullah formed the "Watan Party" which consisted mostly of PDPA Members and members of Daoud Khan's National Revolutionary Party of Afghanistan

Hardline Khalqist Shahnawaz Tanai attempted to overthrow Najibullah in a failed coup attempt in March 1990, the coup was stopped however by the Khalqist General Aslam Watanjar. Although Tanai and his forces failed and fled to Pakistan, the coup attempt still managed to show weaknesses in Najibullah's government.

From 1989 to 1990, the Najibullah government was partially successful in building up the Afghan defence forces. The Ministry of State Security had established a local militia force which stood at an estimated 100,000 men. The 17th Division in Herat, which had begun the 1979 Herat uprising against PDPA-rule, stood at 3,400 regular troops and 14,000 tribal men. In 1988, the total number of security forces available to the government stood at 300,000. This trend did not continue, and by the summer of 1990, the Afghan government forces were on the defensive again. By the beginning of 1991, the government controlled only 10 percent of Afghanistan, the eleven-year Siege of Khost had ended in a mujahideen victory and the morale of the Afghan military finally collapsed. In the Soviet Union, Kryuchkov and Shevardnadze had both supported continuing aid to the Najibullah government, but Kryuchkov had been arrested following the failed 1991 Soviet coup d'état attempt and Shevardnadze had resigned from his posts in the Soviet government in December 1990 – there were no longer any pro-Najibullah people in the Soviet leadership and the Soviet Union was in the middle of an economic and political crisis, which would lead directly to the dissolution of the Soviet Union on 26 December 1991. At the same time, Boris Yeltsin became Russia's new leader, and he had no wish to continue to aid Najibullah's government, which he considered a relic of the past. In the autumn of 1991, Najibullah wrote to Shevardnadze "I didn't want to be president, you talked me into it, insisted on it, and promised support. Now you are throwing me and the Republic of Afghanistan to its fate."

== Fall from power: 1992 ==
By January 1992, with the loss of his biggest supporter, Najibullah had become internationally isolated, while the cut-off of aid led to food and fuel shortages within the capital. He decided to consolidate his power over the non-Pashtuns in the north who were considered less loyal to the regime and began the process of removing non-Pashtun commanders and replacing them with Pashtuns. This came after complaints from his fellow Pashtun Kochis of harassment from an ethnic Tajik general, Abdul Momin. Momin had developed secret ties with the Tajik leader Ahmad Shah Massoud and was passing on secret information to Massoud which led to Najibullah ordering the sacking of Momin which was carried out by Juma Achak, an Achakzai Pashtun who served as Commander of the Northern Zone and was known to hold Pashtun chauvinist views. General Momin was replaced with General Rasul, an ethnic Pashtun Khalqist known for his brutal reputation as commander of Pul-e Charkhi Prison. Now considered to be one of Najibullah's biggest miscalculations, this move opened up ethnic tensions and offended many of the non-Pashtun troops and militias in the north of the country, leading to the army's powerful General Abdul Rashid Dostum, an ethnic Uzbek, to begin secret negotiations with rebel leader Massoud. Simultaneously Najibullah began to negotiate with the Pashtun elements of the mujahideen including Gulbuddin Hekmatyar's Hezbi Islami in an attempt to preserve the Pashtun dominated state institutions of his Homeland Party government.

Kabul ultimately fell to the mujahidin because the factions in its government had finally pulled it apart. Until demoralized by the defections of its senior officers, the army had achieved a level of performance it had never reached under direct Soviet tutelage. It was a classic case of loss of morale. The regime collapsed while it still possessed material superiority.[..] They did not fight because their leaders were reduced to scrambling for survival. Their aid had not only been cut off, the Marxist-Leninist ideology that had provided the government its rationale for existence been repudiated at its source.

— U.S. Library of Congress

Meanwhile, the U.N. Secretary General representative for Afghanistan, Benon Sevan, had been negotiating with Najibullah and the mujahideen rebels for a peaceful settlement to the conflict through the creation of an interim coalition government. Mohammad Najibullah announced his intention to resign as president on March 18, 1992, pending the creation of a neutral, transitional government brokered by the U.N. However, Najibullah effectively lost control after this announcement: his government and military broke into several factions, and the following day General Dostum and his 40,000 soldiers revolted. The defectors would form an anti-Pashtun coalition known as the Movement of the North (Harakat-e Shamal) and ally with the Tajik Jamiat-e Islami, Hazara Hezbe Wahdat, and the Ismaili figure Sayed Mansur Naderi, in taking on the mostly Pashtun, Afghan Military. This move cut off Kabul from the north of the country and its former Soviet border. On March 21, the coalition took control of the city of Mazar-i-Sharif. Many Tajik Parchamites loyal to Babrak Karmal would defect en masse during the capture, including General Nabi Azimi, while the Pashtun Khalqist and pro-Najibullah army and paramilitaries defended the city. Over the next weeks, mujahideen along with defected army officials increased its control in Afghanistan, while the U.N. progressed in negotiations for a new interim government. Many Pashtun Khalqist and Najibullah loyalists decided to ally with Gulbuddin Hekmatyar's Hezb-e Islami Gulbuddin in order to prevent non-Pashtuns from seizing Kabul.

During the tumultuous period leading to the fall of Dr. Najibullah's government in Afghanistan, the Ismaili community, under the leadership of Sayed Mansur Naderi and his son Sayed Jafar Naderi, played a significant role in orchestrating the political and military maneuvers that culminated in Najibullah's ousting. The strategic mutiny led by these Ismaili leaders, in collaboration with other non-Pashtun factions, effectively disrupted Najibullah's main supply route from the former Soviet Union, directly contributing to the collapse of his regime. This pivotal action not only marked a turning point in Afghanistan's history but also highlighted the critical influence of the Ismaili community in shaping the nation's political landscape during a period of profound change and instability.

On April 16, 1992, Najibullah was formally ousted from power after six years in charge. He was scheduled to fly out by the U.N. as rebels closed in the capital, but was stopped at Kabul Airport, which was controlled by Dostum's troops (who were flown in by defected General Azimi the day before) and was commanded by Babrak Karmal's brother, Mahmud Baryalai, effectively sealing vengeance between the Parcham factions. Najibullah was stripped of power and his government replaced by an eight-man council consisting of the four Watan Party vice presidents and army generals in cooperation with the mujahideen, including General Azimi and General Baba Jan Zahid. Najibullah's foreign minister, Abdul Wakil, also rebelled and served under the new administration. The LA Times commented: "Among Afghans, there was remarkably little public display over the fall of their dictator--no celebrations, no sorrow."

Najibullah found refuge at the U.N. compound in Kabul and was refused for a safe passage out by Dostum. Meanwhile, the interim regime that replaced him agreed a few days later to hand over power to a coalition mujahideen government. The Peshawar Accord would be signed on 26 April 1992 between various mujahideen factions, leading to the creation of the new Islamic State of Afghanistan. However, Hezb-e Islami Gulbuddin, the Khalqists and former loyalists of Najibullah would band together and continue to fight this new government in the Third Afghan Civil War.

== Final years and assassination ==
Not long before Kabul's fall, Najibullah appealed to the UN for protection after his guards fled, which was rejected. His attempt to flee to the airport was thwarted by troops of Abdul Rashid Dostum – once loyal to him, but now allied with Ahmad Shah Massoud – who controlled the airport. At the UN compound in Kabul, while waiting for the UN to negotiate his safe passage to India, he occupied himself by translating Peter Hopkirk's book The Great Game into his mother tongue Pashto. India was placed in a difficult position by deciding to allow Najibullah political asylum and safely escorting him out of the country. Supporters claimed he had always been close to India and should not be denied asylum, but others said doing so would risk antagonizing India's relationship with the new mujahideen government formed under the Peshawar Accord.

India also refused to let him take refuge at the Indian embassy in Afghanistan as it risked creating "subcontinental rivalries" and reprisals against Kabul's Indian community, arguing that Najibullah would be far safer at the UN compound. All attempts failed and he eventually sought refuge in the local UN headquarters, where he would stay until 1996. In 1994, India sent senior diplomat M. K. Bhadrakumar to Kabul to hold talks with Ahmad Shah Massoud, the defence minister, to consolidate relations with the Afghan authorities, reopen the embassy, and allow Najibullah to fly to India, but Massoud refused. Bhadrakumar wrote in 2016 that he believed Massoud did not want Najibullah to leave as Massoud could strategically make use of him, and that Massoud "probably harboured hopes of a co-habitation with Najib somewhere in the womb of time because that extraordinary Afghan politician was a strategic asset to have by his side". At the time, Massoud was commanding the government's forces fighting the militias of Dostum and Gulbuddin Hekmatyar during the Battle of Kabul. A few months before his death, he quoted, "Afghans keep making the same mistake," reflecting upon his translation to a visitor.

In September 1996, when the Taliban were about to enter Kabul, Massoud claimed to have offered Najibullah an opportunity to flee the capital. Najibullah refused. The reasons for his refusal might have been that unlike other members of the former regime, Najibullah had not been granted amnesty by the Islamic State of Afghanistan. The UN Secretary-General Boutros Boutros-Ghali had pleaded with the government of Burhanuddin Rabbani to allow Najibullah to leave the country as he felt that Najibullah was not safe as his presence was well known; Rabbani however refused to grant Najibullah amnesty. Massoud (a member of Rabbani's Jamiat-e Islami Party) himself claimed that Najibullah feared that "if he fled with the Tajiks, he would be for ever damned in the eyes of his fellow Pashtuns." Others, like General Tokhi, who was with Najibullah until the day before his torture and murder, stated that Najibullah mistrusted Massoud after his militia had repeatedly fired rockets at the UN compound and had effectively barred Najibullah from leaving Kabul. "If they wanted Najibullah to flee Kabul in safety," Tokhi said, "they could have provided him the opportunity as they did with other high-ranking officials from the communist party from 1992 to 1996." Dr Najibullah was the only member of the old regime (besides Assadullah Sawari) to not be granted amnesty by the Islamic State of Afghanistan. Whatever his true motivations were, when Massoud's militia went to both Najibullah and General Tokhi and asked them to flee Kabul, they rejected the offer.

Najibullah was at the UN compound when unknown soldiers came for him on the evening of 26 September 1996. He was abducted from UN custody, and shot in the head. It is alleged that members of the Taliban after finding his corpse dragged his corpse behind a truck through the streets of Kabul. His brother, General Shahpur Ahmadzai, was given the same treatment. Najibullah and Shahpur's bodies were hanged from a traffic light pole outside the Arg presidential palace the next day in order to show the public that a new era had begun. The Taliban prevented Islamic funeral prayers for Najibullah and Shahpur in Kabul, but the bodies were later handed over to the International Committee of the Red Cross who in turn sent their bodies to Gardez in Paktia Province, where both of them were buried after the Islamic funeral prayers for them by their fellow Ahmadzai tribesmen. The perpetrators of the murder have been debated; some -including Soviet journalists Plastun and Andrianov who knew Najibullah personally, US Special Envoy to Afghanistan Peter Tomsen, the former National Directorate of Security, Afghanistan's Strategic and Scientific Research Center, and many Pashtun Nationalist including a former senator in Pakistan, Afrasiab Khattak - have claimed that Najibullah was assassinated by the ISI (alongside members of the Taliban working for them) allegedly over his Pashtun nationalist stance against the Durand Line as well as revenge for the botched Battle of Jalalabad in 1989. In his book The Wars of Afghanistan, Tomsen wrote, “Najib's entrapment and execution carried the hallmarks of a classic intelligence operation. The Taliban, on their own, would not have taken such elaborate precautions to avoid violating the UN's diplomatic premises (where Dr Najibullah had taken sanctuary since stepping down in 1992).” In 1996, Mullah Borjan, who was the commander-in-chief of the Taliban siege force on the southeast side of Kabul, claimed to have been approached by the ISI and asked to kill Najibullah. He made it clear that he would never allow Taliban forces to kill former President Najibullah. On 20 September, Mullah Borjan was shot and killed by his bodyguards for unknown reasons. Less than a week later, Najibullah was killed.

=== Reactions ===
News of Najibullah's murder met with widespread international condemnation, particularly in the Muslim world. The United Nations issued a statement which condemned the killing of Najibullah, and claimed that it would further destabilise Afghanistan. The Taliban responded by issuing death sentences on Dostum, Massoud and Burhanuddin Rabbani. India, which had been supporting Najibullah, strongly condemned his killing and began to support Massoud's United Front/Northern Alliance in an attempt to contain the rise of the Taliban.

On the 20th anniversary of his death, in 2016, Afghanistan's Research Center blamed the ISI for his death, claiming that the plan to kill Najibullah was implemented by Pakistan.

On 1 June 2020, following a visit to his grave in Gardez by the Afghan National Security Advisor Hamdullah Mohib, Najibullah's widow Fatana Najib said that before constructing a mausoleum for him, the government should first investigate his assassination.

== Legacy ==
After Najibullah's death, the ongoing brutal civil war between mujahideen factions, the Taliban regime, with escalating corruption and poverty led to his image among the Afghan people dramatically improving. Najibullah came to be accepted as a strong and patriotic leader posthumously. Since the 2010s, posters and pictures of him have become a common sight in many Afghan cities. Najibullah is a very popular figure amongst Pashtun Nationalists many of whom view his fall as the biggest blow to the Pashtun Nationalist Movement. Since the creation of Pakistan, the various governments of Afghanistan - whether Monarchy, Republican or Communist - had all backed Pashtun Nationalist parties such as ANP. The fall of Najibullah was considered by Afghan Mellat Wakman faction leader Anwar ul-Haq Ahady as "the end of Pashtun dominance in Afghan politics".

In 1997, the Watan Party of Afghanistan was formed and in 2003, the National United Party of Afghanistan was registered – who seek to unite former PDPA members formerly led by Mohammad Najibullah.

== Views ==
Najibullah is often referred to as a communist by some; however, his rule from 1987 to 1992 was marked with a shift away from communism towards Islamic socialism and a mixed economy. In terms of policy, Najibullah can be best compared to Daoud Khan, who ruled the Republic of Afghanistan before the PDPA took power in 1978. Najibullah's government also featured many former ministers of the Daoud Khan government.

Najibullah was in support of restoration of the monarchy to some capacity, he restored Zahir Shah's citizenship and actively encouraged Zahir Shah to take part in negotiations, Najibullah's wife Fatana Najib is also related to former Afghan King Amanaullah. Najibullah was a Pashtun Nationalist being hailed as the first Afghan leader to speak Pashto at the UN General Assembly and having Afghan Cosmonaut Abdul Ahad Momand (also an Ethnic Pashtun) making Pashto the 4th language spoken in space under his leadership. He often questioning the legitimacy of Pakistan's existence claiming it was "born out of British colonialism". Najibullah whose father was also a Pashtun Nationalist, had strong ties to the Pashtun Nationalist community in the Pashtun majority North West Frontier province. Najibullah was present during the funeral for Pashtun Nationalist leader Abdul Ghaffar who was granted military honors.

Najibullah also attempted to hand over the control of non Pashtun ethnic militias to Pashtun leaders as he had grown to distrust many northern militias such as Abdul Rashid Dostum's Uzbek militia which had committed atrocities and started to open channels with Ahmad Shah Massoud. A Soviet GRU dossier on Najibullah described him as "A Pushtun nationalist, he is one of the motivating spirits of the policy of “Pushtunization” of Afghan society. Within his closest circle he speaks only in Pashto. He is inclined to select colleagues not for their professional qualities but for their personal devotion to him, predominantly relatives and fellow-villagers". Under Najibullah over 50% of Afghan media was in the Pashto language.

== Family ==
Najibullah was married on 1 September 1974 to Fatana Najib, principal of the Peace School whom he met when she was an eighth-grade student and he was her science tutor. The couple had three daughters, who were forced to leave Afghanistan after the Taliban seizure and the start of the civil war. The daughters grew up with their mother in New Delhi, India, after moving there in 1992.

Najibullah had at least three brothers: General Shahpur Ahmadzai who was murdered along with Najibullah in 1996, Sediqullah Rahi, a one-time Afghan National Bank employee who had also lived in Hamburg (then West Germany) and in 1988 defected to the Northern Alliance and fled to Pakistan aged 37 (born 1950 or 1951), and another, unnamed brother mentioned by Rahi as "working for the KGB" in 1988. This possibly refers to Roshan Ahmadzai, the third brother of Najibullah, who was a junior official of the Ministry of Foreign Affairs. Rahi later moved to the United States and denounced the Taliban as a "religious fanatic group" not wanted by the people of Afghanistan and stated that they "represent the interests of Pakistan". Their father died at a hospital in Kabul in 1983.

== See also ==
- Watan Party of Afghanistan
- Sulaiman Layeq

== Notes ==
Party political offices
Preceded by Babrak Karmal	General Secretary of the Central Committee of the People's Democratic Party; 1986–1992	Succeeded by Office abolished
Political offices
Preceded by Haji Mohammad Chamkani	Chairman of the Presidium of the Revolutionary Council; 1987	Succeeded by Himself as President
Preceded by Himself as Chairman of the Presidium of the Revolutionary Council	2nd President of Afghanistan; 1987–1992	Succeeded by Burhanuddin Rabbani
Vacant Title last held by Mohammed Daoud Khan (1978)	2nd President of Afghanistan; 1987–1992	Succeeded by Burhanuddin Rabbani
Government offices
Preceded by Asadullah Amin	Director of the State Intelligence Agency; 1980–1985	Succeeded by Ghulam Faruq Yaqubi
