= Ulya Janab =

Ulya Janab (fl. 1901), was an Afghan royal consort. She was married to Habibullah Khan (r. 1901–1919).

She was born to Mohammad Yusuf Khan, sister of Mohammed Nadir Shah, the great grandchild of Sultan Mohammad Khan, brother of Dost Muhammad Khan. She was raised in British India, since her father had been exiled there by Abdur Rahman Khan.

She was one of the many wives of the king. It was the custom of the monarch to have four official wives and a large number of unofficial wives as well as slave concubines in the harem of the royal Palace complex in Kabul. She was one of his more prominent wives. Having been raised in British India, she dressed in Western fashion, which was well seen by Habibullah Khan who wished all of his wives to dress in Western fashion, though they only did so inside of the royal palace complex.

She spoke Urdu, and has been referred to as the first woman to make a translation from Urdu to Dari when she translated 'Al-Farooq, a life of the Caliph Omar, companion of the Prophet Mohammed', which was finished and published after her death by Najaf Ali Khan 1932.

Her spouse died in 1919 and her brother succeeded to the throne in 1929.
