= Afghan nationalism =

Form of nationalism relating to the Afghan national identity

The traditional black-red-green tricolor is the most common symbol of Afghan nationalism

Afghan nationalism is the belief or assertion that the Afghan people are a distinct nation. Afghan nationalists promote the social and cultural integration of all people living in Afghanistan. Afghan nationalists also tend to promote the re-unification of the Pashtun people living in the neighboring Pakhtunkhwa region to form a 'Greater Afghanistan'. This tends to cause Afghan nationalism to overlap with Pashtun nationalism.

== History ==
It has been argued that Afghan nationalism has its roots in the years 1901–1929. Much of Afghanistan's nationalism is rooted to be after the Great Game, with it arising following the victory of the Emirate of Afghanistan against the British Empire after the Third Anglo-Afghan War. Afghan nationalism has been viewed as a cause of the Soviet–Afghan War due to what the Afghan mujahideen described as fighting against 'Soviet neocolonialism' during the era of warm relations in the 1970s between the Soviet Union and communist-leaning Afghan governments. During the continuous Afghan Civil Wars in the late 1990s, Afghan nationalism and or Afghan patriotism was described as being at a weak point. To protect its own interests, Pakistan has also played a role in keeping Afghan nationalism down to prevent "Greater Afghanistan" from becoming a reality as it overlaps with Pashtun nationalism and separatism in the Pakhtunkhwa region. Afghan nationalism has also been associated with the Taliban movement.

Afghan nationalism became increasingly prominent in the late 1980s under Mohammed Najibullah. The ideology of the ruling party had gradually changed to one seeking pan-Afghan unity against what was called the threat posed by Pakistan and other foreign actors.

== Beliefs ==
Afghan nationalists have, at least historically, attempted to implement a modern Afghan national identity as a united people who share a common historical culture and legacy. Afghan nationalists tend to have right-wing conservative positions like those of the Taliban movement, or left-wing Marxist/Socialist positions like those of the Khalqists, Daoud Khan's Revolutionary Party, and supporters of the former president Najibullah Ahmadzai.
