= People's Democratic Party of Afghanistan =

Ruling party of Afghanistan from 1978 to 1992

People's Democratic Party of Afghanistan Pashto: د افغانستان د خلق ډموکراټیک ګوند Dari: حزب دموکراتيک خلق افغانستان
- Abbreviation: PDPA
- Governing body: Central committee
- Founders: Nur Muhammad Taraki; Babrak Karmal
- Founded: 1 January 1965 (61 years, 302 days)
- Banned: 6 May 1992 (34 years, 177 days)
- Succeeded by: Homeland Party
- Youth wing: Democratic Youth Organisation of Afghanistan
- Women's wing: Democratic Women's Organisation of Afghanistan
- Membership: ▲160,000 (late '80s est.)
- Ideology: Communism Marxism–Leninism Left-wing nationalism Afghan nationalism
- Political position: Far-left
- National affiliation: National Fatherland Front; Left-Democratic Parties
- Colours: Red Yellow
- Slogan: “Long live the PDPA, protector of the working class” (1978)
- Anthem: "Anthem of the PDPA"

Party flag

The People's Democratic Party of Afghanistan (PDPA), (Note: Pashto: د افغانستان د خلق دموکراټیک ګوند, Da Afghanistān da khalq dimukrātīk gund; Dari: حزب دموکراتيک خلق افغانستان, Hezb-e dimūkrātĩk-e khalq-e Afghānistān) known as the Homeland Party after June 1990, was a Marxist–Leninist political party in Afghanistan established on 1 January 1965. Four members of the party won seats in the 1965 Afghan parliamentary election, reduced to two seats in 1969, albeit both before the party was fully legal. For most of its existence, the party was split between the hardline Khalq and moderate Parcham factions, each of which claimed to represent the "true" PDPA.

The party adhered to Marxist–Leninist ideology and toed a staunch pro-Soviet political line. The PDPA's secret constitution, which was adopted by the party during its founding congress in January 1965 but never publicly released to party cadres, described itself as "the vanguard of the working class and all laborers in Afghanistan" and defined its party ideology as "the practical experience of Marxism–Leninism". While PDPA's internal documents incorporated explicitly Marxist terminology, the party refrained from formally branding itself as "communist" in public, instead using labels such as "national democratic" and "socialist". PDPA's public platform document published in April 1966 asserted that its political objectives involved the creation of a "democratic national government" as well as the long-term goal of establishing a socialist state.

The Khalq-Parcham organizational split erupted within the PDPA in 1967. While the Khalqists adhered to rigid Marxist–Leninist dogma and toed a militant revolutionary line, the Parchamis wanted to establish a "common front" with other left-wing parties. In July 1977, Khalq and Parcham factions re-merged into the PDPA after Soviet mediation, with the objective of preparing a coup against Daoud Khan's regime. During the initial period of Khalqist rule from 1978 to 1979, PDPA portrayed itself as advancing a "socialist revolution" in Afghanistan. After the ouster and killing of Hafizullah Amin in a palace coup launched by Soviet military forces in December 1979, a Parchamite-dominated PDPA claimed that its government was facilitating what it described as the "national-democratic stage" of Marxist transformation. In its final 5 years, the party under Najibullah moved away from Marxism–Leninism and towards Afghan nationalism.

While a minority, the party helped Mohammad Daoud Khan, former Prime Minister of Afghanistan, overthrow King Mohammad Zahir Shah in 1973 and establish the Republic of Afghanistan. Initially, the PDPA was highly represented in the government cabinet, but many PDPA officials were later dismissed as relations between the party and President Khan worsened. In 1978, the PDPA, with help from members of the Afghan National Army, seized power from Daoud Khan in what became known as the Saur Revolution. The PDPA led by Nur Muhammad Taraki established the Democratic Republic of Afghanistan, which would last until 1987. After National Reconciliation talks in 1987, the official name of the country reverted to the Republic of Afghanistan (as it was known before 1978). Under the leadership of Mohammad Najibullah in 1990, the party was renamed the Homeland Party and much of the party's symbols and policies were altered or removed. The republic lasted until 1992, when mujahideen rebels seized the capital Kabul and took over the country's government. The Homeland Party was subsequently banned, with some officials joining the new government, some joining militias, and others deserting.

== History ==
Nur Mohammad Taraki started his political career as an Afghan journalist. On 1 January 1965, Taraki, with Babrak Karmal, established the Democratic People's Party of Afghanistan. In the beginning the party ran under the name People's Democratic Tendency, since secularist and anti-monarchist parties were illegal. The People's Democratic Party of Afghanistan (PDPA) was officially formed at the unity congress of the different factions of the Socialist Party of Afghanistan on 1 January 1965. Twenty-seven men gathered at Taraki's house in Kabul, elected Taraki as the first party Secretary General and Karmal as Deputy Secretary General, and chose a five-member Central Committee (also called a Politburo). Taraki was invited to Moscow by the International Department of the Communist Party of the Soviet Union (CPSU) later that year.

The PDPA was known in Afghan society at that time as having strong ties with the Soviet Union. Eventually, the PDPA was able to get three of its members into parliament, in the first free elections in Afghan history; these three parliamentarians were Karmal, Anahita Ratebzad, Nur Ahmed Nur. Later on, Taraki established the first radical newspaper in Afghan history under the name The Khalq; the newspaper was eventually forced to stop publishing by the government in 1966.

=== Khalq and Parcham ===
In 1967 the party divided into several political sects, the biggest being the Khalqs and the Parchams, as well as the Setami Milli and Grohi Kar. These new divisions started because of ideological and economic reasons. Most of Khalqs supporters came from ethnic Pashtuns from the rural areas in the country. The Parchams supporters mostly came from urban citizens who supported social-economic reforms in the country. The Khalqs accused the Parchams of allegiance to King Mohammed Zahir Shah because their newspaper, the Parcham, was tolerated by the king and published from March 1968 to July 1969.

Karmal sought, unsuccessfully, to persuade the PDPA Central Committee to censure Taraki's excessive radicalism. The vote, however, was close, and Taraki in turn tried to neutralize Karmal by appointing new members to the committee who were his own supporters. After this incident, Karmal offered his resignation, which was accepted by the Politburo. Although the split of the PDPA in 1967 into two groups was never publicly announced, Karmal brought with him less than half the members of the Central Committee.

As a result of the internal strife within the party, the party's representation in the Afghan parliament decreased from four to only two seats in the Afghan parliamentary election in 1969. In 1973 the PDPA assisted Mohammed Daoud Khan with a seizure of power from Zahir Shah in a nearly bloodless military coup. After Daoud had seized power, he established Daoud's Republic of Afghanistan. After the coup, the Loya jirga approved Daoud's new constitution, establishing a presidential one-party system of government in January 1977. The new constitution alienated Daoud from many of his political allies.

=== Reconciliation ===
The Soviet Union set in Moscow played a major role in the reconciliation of the Khalq faction led by Taraki and the Parcham faction led by Karmal. In March 1977, a formal agreement on unity was achieved, and in July the two factions held their first joint conclave in a decade. Since the parties division in 1967 both sides had held contact with Soviet government.

Both parties were consistently pro-Soviet. There are allegations that they accepted financial and other forms of aid from the Soviet embassy and intelligence organs. However, the Soviets were close to King Zahir Shah and his cousin Daoud Khan—the first Afghan President—and it could have damaged their relations. There are no facts proving that the Soviets provided financial help to either Khalqis or Parchamis.

Taraki and Karmal maintained close contact with the Soviet Embassy and its personnel in Kabul, and it appears that Soviet Military Intelligence (Glavnoye Razvedyvatel'noye Upravleniye – GRU) assisted Khalq's recruitment of military officers.

=== Saur Revolution ===
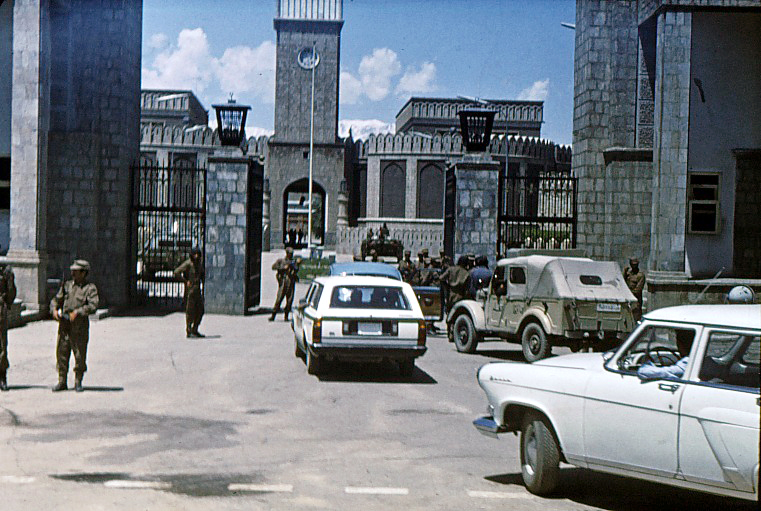
Outside the gate of Arg in Kabul, the day after Saur revolution on 28 April 1978.

In 1978 a prominent member of the PDPA on the Parcham side of the party, Mir Akbar Khyber, is claimed to have been assassinated by the government and its associates. While the government rejected any claims of having assassinated him, the PDPA members apparently feared that Mohammad Daoud Khan was planning to exterminate them all. Shortly after a massive protest against the government during the funeral ceremonies of Khaibar, most of the leaders of PDPA were arrested by the government. With a number of Afghan military officers supporting the Khalq faction of the PDPA wing, Hafizullah Amin stayed out of prison long enough to organize an uprising with the group.

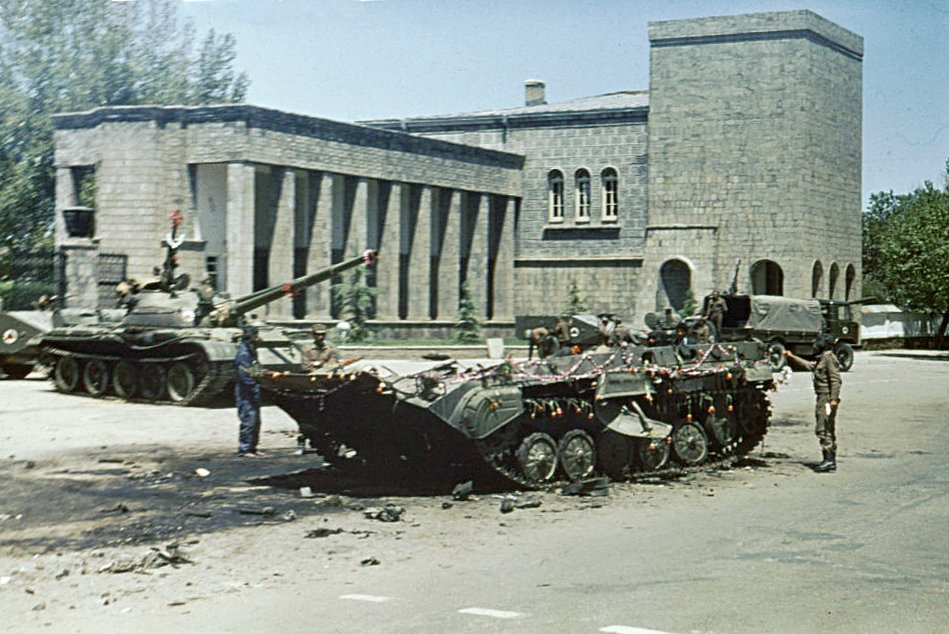
The day after the Saur revolution in Kabul.

On the eve of the coup, the Afghan police did not send Amin to immediate imprisonment, as it did with the three Politburo members and Taraki on 25 April 1978. His imprisonment was postponed for five hours, during which time he was under house arrest. He gave instructions to the Khalqi military officers through his family before being sent to jail on 26 April 1978.

The regime of President Daoud came to a violent end in the early morning hours of 28 April 1978, when military units from the Kabul military base loyal to the Khalq faction of the party stormed the Presidential Palace in Kabul. The coup was also strategically planned for this date because it was the day before Friday, the Muslim day of worship, and most military commanders and government workers were off duty. Tanks were utilized in the coup d'état, with Major Aslam Watanjar commanding the tank units. With the help of the Afghan air force led by Colonel Abdul Qadir, the insurgent troops overcame the resistance of the Presidential Guard, assassinated Daoud, and killed most members of his family. Hafizullah Amin renamed the country to the Democratic Republic of Afghanistan (DRA), and Qadir assumed the control of the country from 27 to 30 April 1978 as the Head of the Military Revolutionary Council.

=== New reforms ===
The divided PDPA succeeded the Daoud regime with a new government under the leadership of Nur Muhammad Taraki of the Khalq faction. In Kabul, the initial cabinet appeared to be carefully constructed to alternate ranking positions between Khalqis and Parchamis. Taraki was Prime Minister, Babrak Karmal was senior Deputy Prime Minister, and Hafizullah Amin was foreign minister.

Once in power, the PDPA embarked upon a program of rapid modernization centered on separation of Mosque and State, eradication of illiteracy (which at the time stood at 90%), land reform, emancipation of women, and abolition of feudal practices. A Soviet-style national flag replaced the traditional black, red, and green.

Traditional practices that were deemed feudal – such as usury, bride price and forced marriage – were banned, and the minimum age of marriage was raised. The government stressed education for both women and men, and launched an ambitious literacy campaign. Sharia Law was abolished, and men were encouraged to cut off their beards.

These new reforms were not well received by the majority of the Afghan population, particularly in rural areas; many Afghans saw them as un-Islamic and as a forced approach to Western culture in Afghan society. Most of the government's new policies clashed directly with the traditional Afghan understanding of Islam, making religion one of the only forces capable of unifying the tribally and ethnically divided population against the unpopular new government, and ushering in the advent of Islamist participation in Afghan politics. The literacy campaign additionally proved to be a political disaster, where the Khalq sent volunteers from all over the country with orders to make the entire Afghan population literate in under a year. Unlike previous literacy reforms, where villagers were involved in building school houses and teachers were local, the Khalq sent new teachers from Kabul and other provincial capitals, who were perceived as arrogant by the rural population and 'insufferably disrespectful' towards village elders. Enforced coeducation, with young men teaching adult women in mixed-gender classes, was also a shock to local value systems. The textbooks locals received featured Marxist slogans, and they additionally had to study the Russian language which was perceived as an 'infidel language' of a European imperialist power, further increasing the literacy program's unpopularity among the rural population.

The first signs of a rebellion appeared on 20 July 1978 in the far eastern provinces of Nuristan and Kunar.

=== Repression ===
The new government launched a campaign of repression, which killed thousands, mostly at Pul-e-Charkhi prison. Estimates for the number executed at the prison, between April 1978 and December 1979, are as high as 27,000. Political scientist Olivier Roy estimated between 50,000 and 100,000 people disappeared during the Taraki–Amin period.

Despite accusations and predictions by conservative elements, a year and a half after the coup no restrictions had been placed on religious practice.

=== Parcham rule ===
In the 1979 Soviet Operation Storm-333, the Soviet special force Spetsnaz stormed the Tajbeg Palace and killed PDPA general secretary Hafizullah Amin. The death of Amin led to Babrak Karmal becoming the new Afghan leader and General Secretary of the PDPA, and marked the beginning of the Soviet–Afghan War.

According to photographic evidence, the PDPA established its own tea brand which would be handed out to government employees, contractors and factory workers under Parcham rule.

The Khalq–Parcham rivalry remained in place. Clashes between members often resulted in fatalities, with rival gangs of each side firing at each other.

Moscow came to regard Karmal as a failure and blamed him for the problems. Years later, when Karmal's inability to consolidate his government had become obvious, Mikhail Gorbachev, then General Secretary of the CPSU, said:

The main reason that there has been no national consolidation so far is that Comrade Karmal is hoping to continue sitting in Kabul with our help.

Additionally, some Afghan soldiers who had fought for the socialist government began to defect or leave the army. In May 1986, Karmal was replaced as party general secretary by Mohammad Najibullah, and six months later he was relieved of the presidency. His successor as head of state was Haji Mohammad Chamkani. Karmal then moved (or, allegedly, was exiled) to Moscow.

=== National reconciliation ===
After the Soviet Union had leveled most of the villages south and east of Kabul, creating a massive humanitarian disaster, the demise of the PDPA continued with the rise of the Mujahideen guerrillas, who were trained in Pakistani camps with US support. Between 1982 and 1992, the number of people recruited by Pakistan's Inter-Services Intelligence (ISI) agency to join the insurgency topped 100,000.

The Soviet Union withdrew in 1989, but continued to provide military assistance worth billions of dollars to the PDPA regime until the USSR's collapse in 1991.

==== Homeland Party ====
Homeland Party
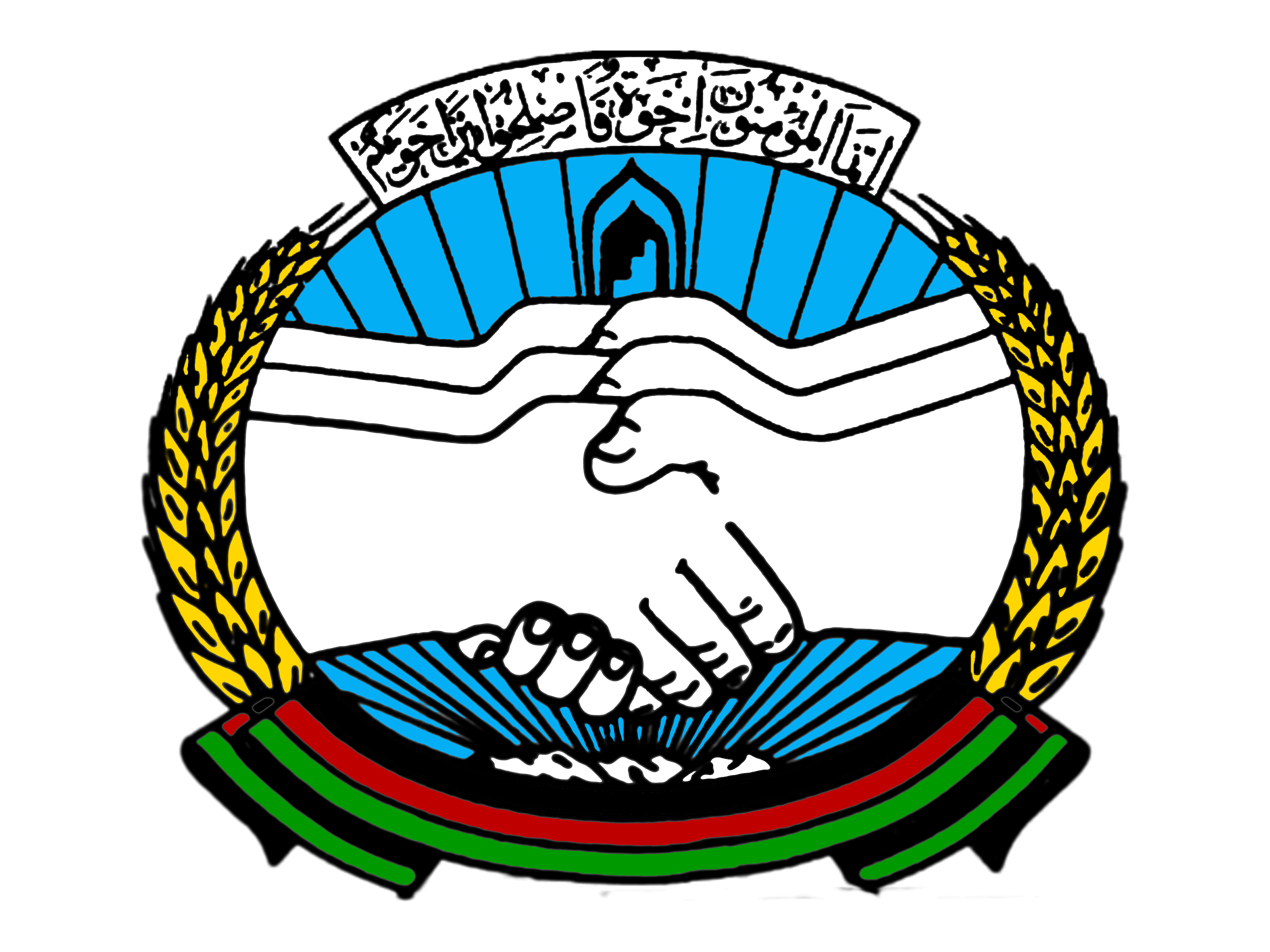
- Leader: Mohammad Najibullah; (1990–1992)
- Founded: June 1990
- Dissolved: 6 May 1992
- Preceded by: Parcham
- Succeeded by: Watan Party
- Headquarters: Kabul, Afghanistan
- Ideology: Afghan nationalism
- Political position: Centre-left to left-wing
- International affiliation: Socialist International

Party flag
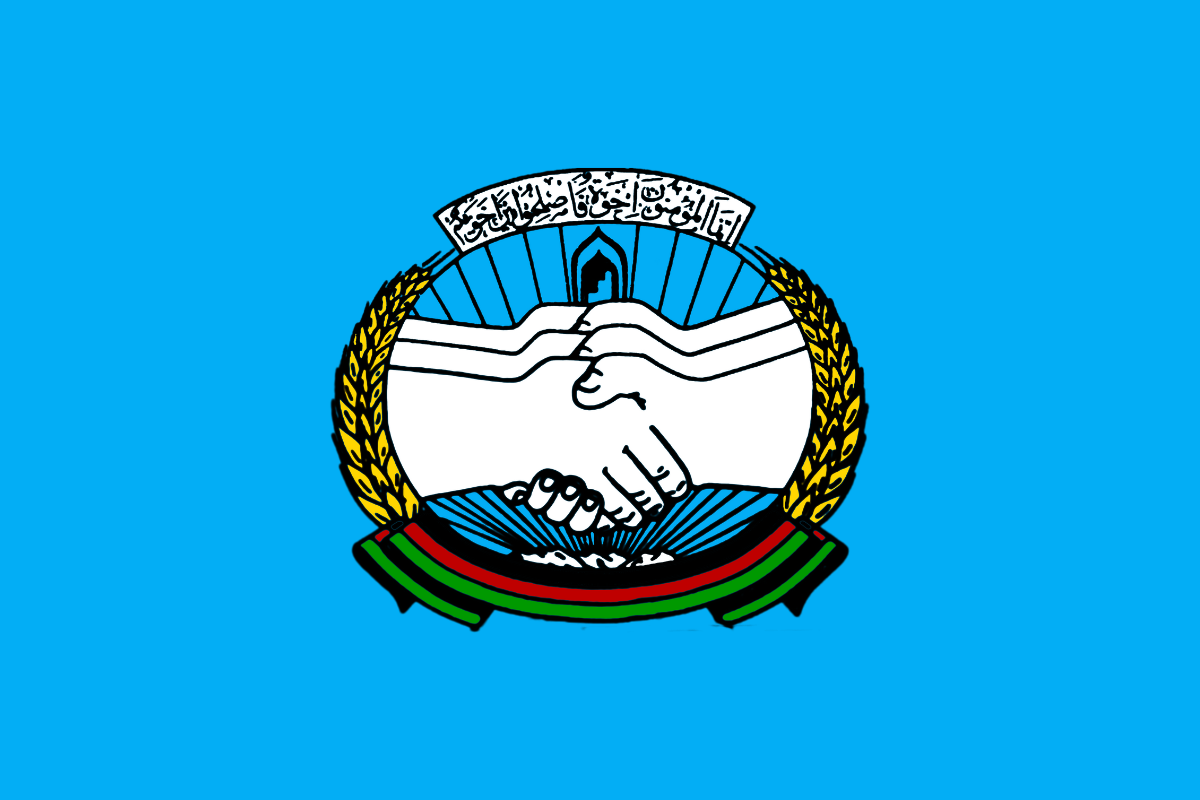

The Soviet troop withdrawal in late 1989 changed the political structure that had enabled the PDPA to stay in power all those years. Inner collapse of the government started when Gulbuddin Hekmatyar withdrew his support for the government. Later in March 1990 Defense Minister and Chief of Staff of the Armed Forces Shahnawaz Tanai tried to seize power in a military coup. The coup failed and Tanai was forced to flee the country. Najibullah still hung on to the presidency, so in June 1990 he renamed the party the Homeland Party. The party dropped the Marxist–Leninist ideology that had been held previously by the PDPA.

In 1991, the USSR dissolved and all support for the government stopped after Boris Yeltsin came into power. In April 1992, the Homeland Party regime in Afghanistan collapsed after the sudden mass defection of non-Pashtuns such as General Abdul Rashid Dostum following President Najibullah's sacking of ethnic Tajik General Abdul Momin in favor of General Rasul who was an ethnic Pashtun like Najibullah. Post-Najibullah interim leader Abdul Rahim Hatif agreed on 22 April 1992 to a rebel-led state. The party was banned on 6 May 1992, by the predominately Tajik led Jamiat-i Islami Government.

== Ideology ==
Since 1919, the Soviet Union had strongly influenced Afghan politics, economy and military (see Soviet–Afghan relations before 1979). The thousands of Afghan academic students and military trainees in the USSR were compelled to study Marxism–Leninism and the international communist movement; some of them became communists. Nur Muhammad Taraki, the first PDPA General Secretary in 1978, had worked and studied in India in 1932, had met members of the Communist Party of India there, and had become a communist. Hafizullah Amin, the second PDPA General Secretary, had seen his leftist beliefs strengthened during his studies in the United States in the late 1950s. Taraki and Babrak Karmal (the third PDPA General Secretary) were Soviet agents since the 1950s.

From its inception in 1965 until at least 1984, the PDPA labeled themselves "national democratic", not communist; however, in its view of international relations, the PDPA was clearly pro-Soviet oriented. The party also publicly asserted that their desired changes could be achieved peacefully, however their ultimate goal was a revolution, and they were aware that it could only be accomplished through violence. The secret party constitution of 1965 called for "expanding and strengthening Afghan-Soviet friendly relations". A party history in 1976 stated, "The party struggles against imperialism, particularly American imperialism and its ally, Maoism, and is fighting alongside our brother parties, foremost among them the Leninist party of the Soviet Union." In a 1978 party pamphlet, the PDPA described itself as a "vanguard of the working class" and General Secretary Taraki as an "experienced Marxist–Leninist". These descriptions led Western authors to label PDPA as either of "clear Marxist orientation", "an avowedly pro-Soviet socialist movement", or reformist "with a socialist bent". The PDPA's party constitution leaked in 1978 explicitly mentioned Marxism-Leninism as the future of Afghanistan and by the end of 1978, Amin declared the Saur revolution as the "continuation of [the] Great October Revolution", leaving no doubts about the PDPA's orientation.

After the April 1978 PDPA coup d'état, PDPA general secretary Taraki stated that the PDPA were nationalists and revolutionaries but not communists, and declared a commitment to Islam within a secular state. Once in power, however, it became clear that the PDPA was dominated by an urban intelligentsia and lacked any real social base in the overwhelmingly rural and Islamic communities of Afghanistan. The party launched a programme ranging from land redistribution to emancipation and education of women, which violated traditional customs, religious laws, and the balance of power between Kabul and the rural localities. The radical reform program, class-struggle, anti-imperialistic rhetoric, the signing of a friendship treaty with the Soviet Union, increased presence of Soviet advisers in the country, and support of countries like Cuba and North Korea led to the international media and domestic opponents giving the label of "communist" to the PDPA.

Pro-Najibists relaunched the Hezb-e Watan in 2004 and again in 2017.

== Organization ==
=== Congress ===
- 1st Congress (1967)
- 2nd Congress (1987)

==== Central Committee ====
In the period April 1978 – September 1979 the Central Committee contained 38 individuals, of these, 12 were either purged, imprisoned or executed on the orders of Taraki after the Saur Revolution. With Taraki's ouster and execution in 1979, another member was removed. During Hafizullah Amin's short rule, September–December 1979, the Central Committee had at most 33 members, 12 of which were appointed by him. Upon Babrak Karmal's ascension to power 25 members were either executed or purged on his orders (76% of the members). He reinstated 14 members (including himself), who had been purged by either Taraki or Amin, appointed 15 newcomers and retained 7 Amin appointees. The Central Committee now contained 36 members. A year later, in June 1981, 10 new members were appointed to the Central Committee (the body now containing a record high 46 members), in a bid to increase the representation of Parchamites. Two years later, in 1983, six more members were appointed, with the Central Committee now containing 52 full members and 27 candidate members. Of these 52 members, only three had held offices continuously through Taraki's, Amin's and Karmal's rule; they were Abdur Rashid Arian, Mohammed Ismail Danesh and Saleh Mohammad Zeary (often referred to as a Khalqist).

=== Central Committee apparatus ===
==== General Secretary, Politburo and Secretariat ====
The Politburo and Secretariat were elected by a plenum of the Central Committee, exactly as how it was done within the Communist Party of the Soviet Union (CPSU). As in the CPSU, the Politburo was the main executive and legislative body of the PDPA when the congress nor the Central Committee were in session. All decisions of the Politburo were implemented by the Secretariat, a body concurrently in session with the Politburo.

Throughout its existence, the body usually had between 7 and 9 members. During Taraki's rule, 10 members had held seats in the PDPA Politburo, this was reduced to seven by Amin (only four members from the Taraki period were retained under Amin), and it was increased back to nine by Karmal. 6 members from the Amin period were either executed or disappeared, and Karmal turned the Politburo into a Parcham-dominated body. In the immediate aftermath of the Saur Revolution, there was "almost an even balance" between the Khalqist and the Parchamites in the body, but Khalqist representation was continuously increased under they formed a majority under Amin. The Politburo had one female member throughout its existence; Anahita Ratebzad. Unlike the Soviet practices the PDPA did not publish the list of Politburo members according to rank, but rather by alphabetical order. There is one exception however, and it was published in the book Handbook for Party Activists of the People's Democratic Party of Afghanistan (published after the 6th Plenary Session of the 1st Central Committee in June 1981).

- Nur Muhammad Taraki, 1965–1979
- Hafizullah Amin, 1979
- Babrak Karmal, 1979–1986
- Mohammad Najibullah, 1986–1992

==== Subordinate bodies ====
The PDPA Central Committee had several specialized commissions which handled day-to-day affairs. For instance, the party had the International Relations Commission, responsible for PDPA's relations with other parties, the Organization Commission, responsible for personnel appointments nationwide, and the Defense and Judicial Commission, responsible for military policy.

=== Lower-level organizations ===
From 1982 onward, the PDPA experienced an organizational expansion into the countryside. For instance, in 1982 there existed 144 district and sub-district party committees, by mid-1984 it had increased to 205. Out of Afghanistan's fifty-five border districts, fifteen of them lacked a primary party organization (PPO), another nineteen had only one PPO in each district, and in the remaining twenty-one the party, while better organized, remained ineffective. Despite this, in the period 1982 to 1987 the PDPA did witness an organizational growth; witnessing a growth of PPOs from 443 to 1,331. However, the main problem facing the party was that it was not organized in the small villages scattering Afghanistan; out of an estimated 25,000 villages which existed in Afghanistan, the party was organized in an estimated 2,000. Another daunting problem was that the central party leadership had little contact with lower-level organizations in the provinces or, in general, with the people. In 1987, during Najibullah's rule, village-level party secretaries were appointed to the Central Committee in a bid to strengthen central-local contact. Concurrently, a threefold increase in visits by central party personnel to the provinces occurred, in another bid to strengthen the party's contact with the PDPA's lower-level and non-members alike.

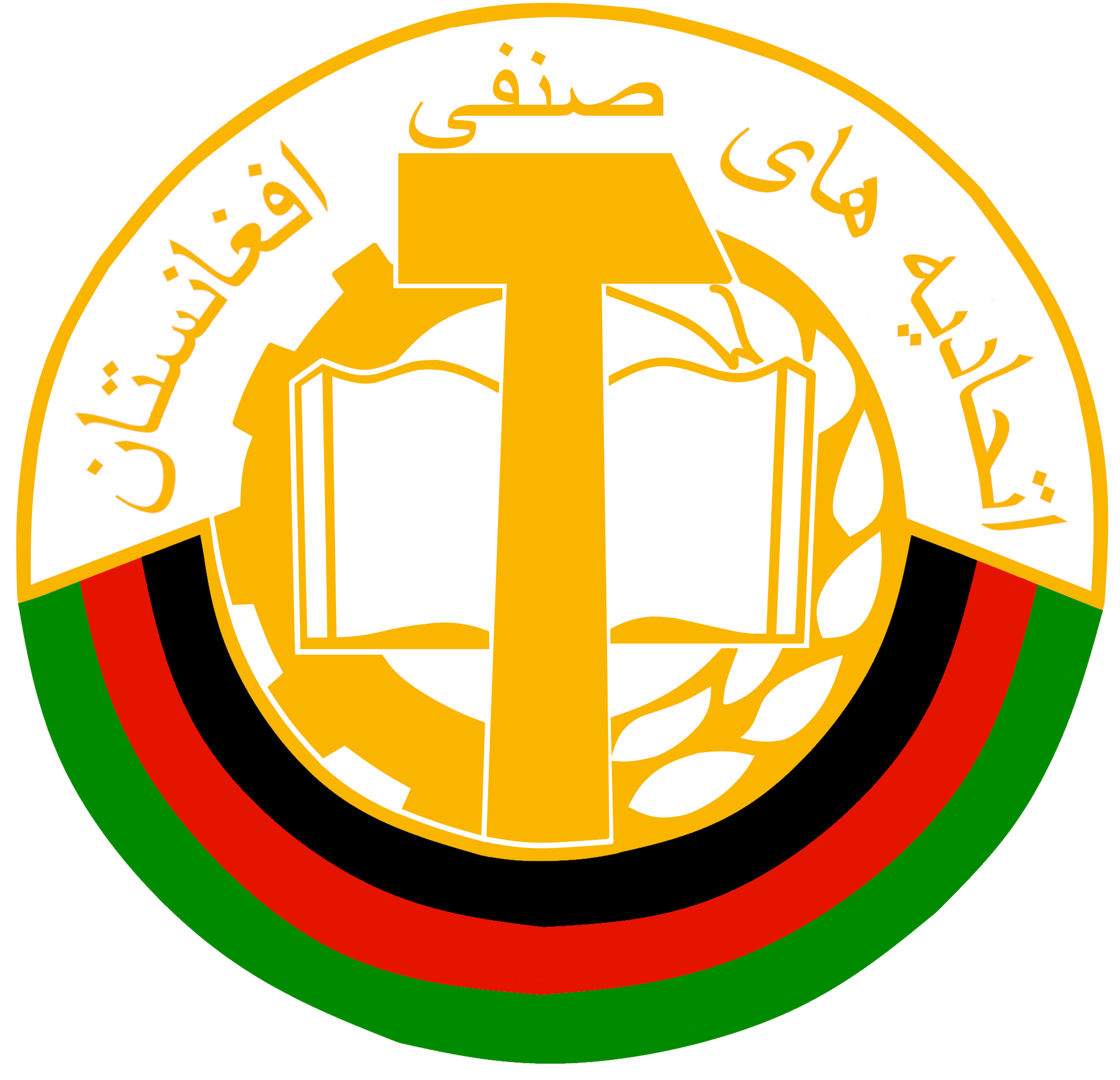
The emblem of the Guild of Trade Unions, under the PDPA

A major problem throughout PDPA's rule was that the majority of mid-level cadres resided in Kabul, rather than the places they were responsible for. Of the 10,000 mid-level cadres in the mid-1980s, 5,000 of them resided in Kabul. For instance, in the period 1982–83 the governor of Faryab province only visited the province during the winter months, since the mujahideen withdrew their troops from the area during those months. Another problem, in Faryab province the PDPA was inactive and the majority of the locals believed that Mohammad Daoud Khan, the president which the communists overthrew in 1978, was still ruling the country. Another case, that of Nangrahar province (in which the government was in complete control) faced a similar problem; the party organization laying dormant. To solve this problem, the PDPA sought to improve the cadres' education by enrolling them to educational institutions within the PDPA, public universities or giving them educational opportunities in the Eastern Bloc or the Soviet Union. The Social Science Institute of the PDPA had a capacity of 2,500 students, and by the end of the 1980s it had given degrees to over 10,000 individuals. Despite all this, the main problem facing the party was the unsafe conditions facing party members serving in the countryside; for instance, when the Ghazni Provincial Committee convened for a meeting the participants had to wait for three months to get home (waiting for an armoured column and a helicopter).

==== Membership ====
The PDPA had 5,000 to 7,000 members upon taking power. However, author Bruce Amstutz believes that PDPA membership probably stood at around 6,000 when Karmal took power. A little over a year later, the membership was estimated to stand between 10,000 and 15,000. By 1984, the party had between 20,000 and 40,000 members (this figure included both ordinary and probationary members), as a result of concerted membership drives in government institutions, state-owned enterprises, and the military. However, at the 1st PDPA Conference, Karmal claimed that the party had 62,820 ordinary and probationary members; this number was exaggerated. The conference reported a growth of 21,700 members since August 1981. From then until a party meeting in 1983, leading party officials claimed the party had between 63,000 and 70,000 members. Half of the members in 1982, were in the armed forces (which was dominated by the Khalqists). In August 1982, Karmal alleged that the PDPA had 20,000 members within the military, and said that "the army party organization forms the greatest part of the PDPA". Earlier that year, in March, Soviet sources stated that the largest concentration of PDPA members were to be found in Kabul Polytechnic Institute (with an estimated 600 members) and at Kabul University (with an estimated 1,000 members). In 1983, Karmal claimed that party membership had grown 35% to 90,000, the following year it had allegedly grown 33% to 120,000 members.

While the membership increase did make the PDPA look more powerful than it really was, the increase was concurrently followed with increased indiscipline amongst members (a majority joined because of sheer opportunism). Before the 1973 coup led by Mohammad Daoud Khan, the vast majority of members either had "graduates of junior colleges or colleges", with many of them either being students or working in the public sector. After the 1973 coup, the Khalqist began recruiting members amongst the Officers Corps, which was proven successful by the takeover of 1978. However, in the aftermath of the coup, membership decreased notably (probably because of the increasing authoritarian policies of the government). By 1979, only the most blatant opportunists would be willing to join the party; the party was at its nadir. After the Soviet intervention, the Soviets forced the PDPA to recruit more members; in 1981 the probationary period for a new member was reduced from one year to six months, and to join a person needed fewer party sponsors. The 1981–83 recruitment drive increased party membership; the majority of the new members worked either in state-owned enterprises, the military. The main problem was that most of these new recruits were "functional illiterate", which in reality led to an overall decline in the quality of party members. In April 1981, 25–30% of members were "workers, farmers, soldiers, and other toilers"; this increased to 38% (both ordinary and probationary members) in 1982 and in 1983, according to Karmal, 28.4% were ordinary members.

== Successors ==
In 1997, Watan Party of Afghanistan was formed, which made attempts to register the old name of the PDPA, but the party was refused registration.

In 2003, the National United Party of Afghanistan, which sought to unite former PDPA members, was registered.
