= Ethnicity in Afghanistan =

Ethnic categories in Afghanistan as of 1997

Afghanistan is a multiethnic country, with its population comprising a variety of social, linguistic, cultural, and tribal communities. The formal categorization of ethnicity in Afghanistan is a relatively recent development, emerging primarily in the 20th century and gaining political significance during the conflicts that began in the 1970s.

Major ethnic categories traditionally identified in Afghanistan include Pashtuns, Tajiks, Hazaras, and Uzbeks. Minor categories include Aimaqs, Turkmens, Balochs, Nuristanis, and Arabs, among others. However, the boundaries between these communities are fluid, with language, self-identification, urban or rural residence, and regional affiliations intersecting in complex ways.

Reliable data on the size and distribution of communities is limited due to decades of conflict, population displacement, and the absence of comprehensive national censuses including these categories. Estimates are based on surveys, historical records, academic studies, and reports from international organizations, each using different methodologies and criteria, therefore often producing widely divergent figures, which reflects the contested and constructed nature of Afghan social categories.

The study of ethnicity in Afghanistan is closely linked to political power, representation, and social organization. Ethnicity has historically influenced the formation of political alliances, patterns of local governance, militia mobilization, and conflict dynamics, while urbanization, state-building, refugee return, and national identity have continued to shape how Afghans perceive themselves and others.

Considering the points outlined above, ethnic categories in Afghanistan should be understood as historically constructed, context-dependent, and politically significant, rather than as fixed or purely objective divisions.

== History of ethnic categorization in Afghanistan ==
The concept of fixed ethnic categories in Afghanistan is relatively recent. Before the 19th century, social identities were defined primarily by tribal belonging (or lack thereof), religious or sectarian affiliation, profession, or social status rather than by ethnicity in the modern sense. Identity markers were situational and fluid, changing with social interactions.

Ethnic categorization began to take shape under colonial and state influences in the 19th century. Scottish historian Mountstuart Elphinstone (1815) mentioned "Afghaun tribes" and other inhabitants of "Afghaunistan." Later, British officers such as Henry Bellew sought to classify the "races of Afghanistan" along linguistic and cultural lines. These early typologies reflected administrative interests more than social realities but initiated systematic framing of the population in terms of ethnicity.

In the 20th century, Afghan state institutions further consolidated these categories for governance, military recruitment, and political representation. At the same time, foreign scholars and anthropologists like René Dollot and Donald Wilber produced surveys equating language, religion, and lifestyle with fixed ethnic boundaries, often simplifying complex and fluid identities into more discrete, standardized groups. Labels such as "Shiite" and "Hazara", previously used interchangeably, became more rigid. Terms like "Tajik" or "Farsiwan", rarely used by the people themselves, emerged in the 1950s as distinct categories for Persian-speaking populations without tribal affiliation. Scholars like Franz Schurmann also contributed to establishing categories such as "Pashai" and "Mountain Tajiks", even where identities had previously been heterogeneous.

By the early 21st century, ethnic categories had become politically and socially significant, embedded in bureaucracy, education, and media. Nonetheless, many Afghans still primarily identified through locality, religion, or other social affiliations rather than ethnicity (see § Identification by other social affiliations). Surveys of ethnic composition varied widely, reflecting political and methodological agendas rather than precise demographics.

Ethnic categories in Afghanistan are likely to remain fluid and contested. Urbanization, migration, and the reintegration of returnees continue to reshape identities, while political narratives further influence social cohesion. Thus, ethnic categories are best understood as historically constructed frameworks shaped by administrative, academic, and political forces, rather than as objective social realities.

== Major ethnic categories ==
=== Pashtun ===
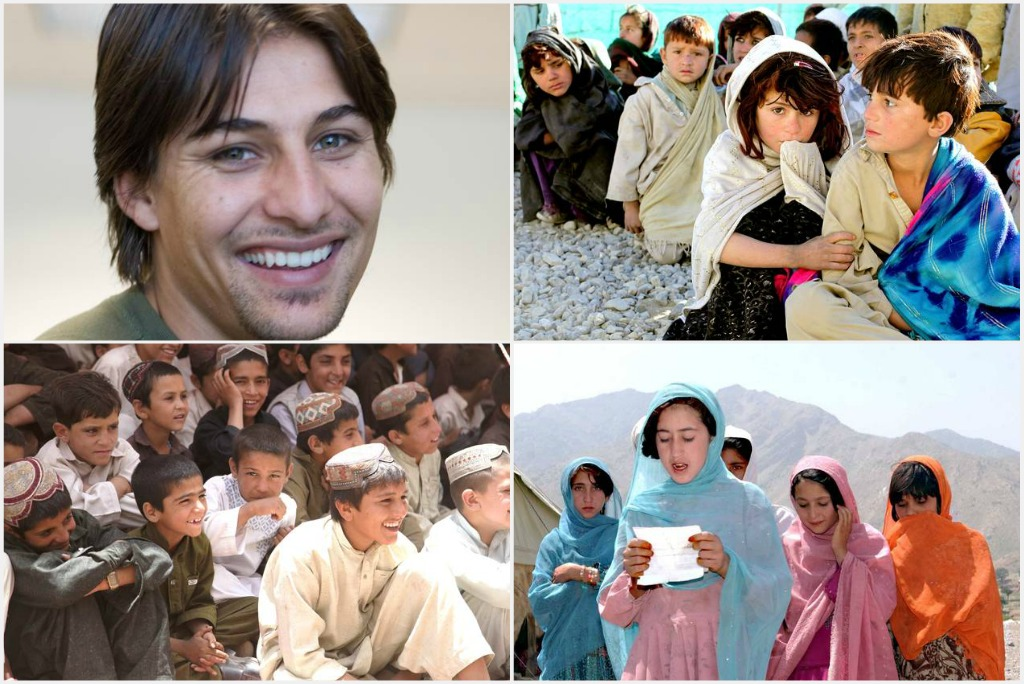
Pashtuns of Afghanistan

The Pashtuns constitute the largest ethnic category in Afghanistan, traditionally forming the backbone of Afghanistan’s social, political, and military structures. Estimates of their share of the population vary from 37% to over 60%, depending on the source, period, and methodology, reflecting the challenges of measuring demographics in a country where no comprehensive census has ever included ethnicity and where conflict, displacement, and fluid social identities complicate population assessment (see § Ethnic composition).

Historically, the Pashtuns have been closely associated with the Durrani tribal confederation, which emerged as a central political force in the 18th century when Ahmad Shah Durrani founded the Durrani Empire in 1747. Their traditional homelands span southern and eastern Afghanistan, extending into the border regions with Pakistan, commonly referred to as Pashtunistan (Loy Pakhtunkhwa). Within this framework, the Kochi represent a nomadic subgroup whose identity revolves around pastoral mobility rather than fixed settlements. Pashtun society is deeply organized around tribal and kinship structures, with customary law—Pashtunwali—regulating conduct, conflict resolution, and inter-tribal relations, reinforcing both social cohesion and local autonomy over centuries.

Ethnic identity among Pashtuns has historically been intertwined with political power. The Durrani dynasty, as well as subsequent Pashtun rulers, emphasized Pashtun leadership as central to Afghan governance. For much of history, the term "Afghan" was synonymous with Pashtun identity, while other groups were categorized primarily by language or religion. Only gradually, particularly in the 20th century and following the upheavals from the 1970s onward, did "Afghan" begin to evolve as a broader national identity embracing all ethnic categories (see § Identification with the Afghan nation).

The Pashto language remains a key marker of Pashtun identity, though bilingualism with Dari is widespread, especially in southern and eastern Afghanistan, urban centers and among those involved in administration or education. Pashtuns have traditionally lived in rural areas, but since the 1960s, large numbers have moved to cities such as Kabul, Kandahar, Jalalabad, and Herat, where interactions with Tajiks, Hazaras, Uzbeks, and other groups create cosmopolitan social settings. Urbanization has led to nuanced expressions of identity, with some emphasizing professional, local, or city-based affiliations alongside ethnic belonging (see § Identification by other social affiliations).

Despite their prominence, Pashtuns are far from monolithic. Tribal, regional, and linguistic divisions create complex social dynamics, and individual identification can vary according to local, urban, or professional circumstances. Religiously, most Pashtuns are Sunni Muslims, which complements ethnic identity and provides a unifying framework across tribal divisions. In contemporary Afghanistan, Pashtuns continue to play a central role in politics, security, and society while negotiating the balance between traditional tribal structures and modern state institutions.

=== Tajik and Farsiwan ===
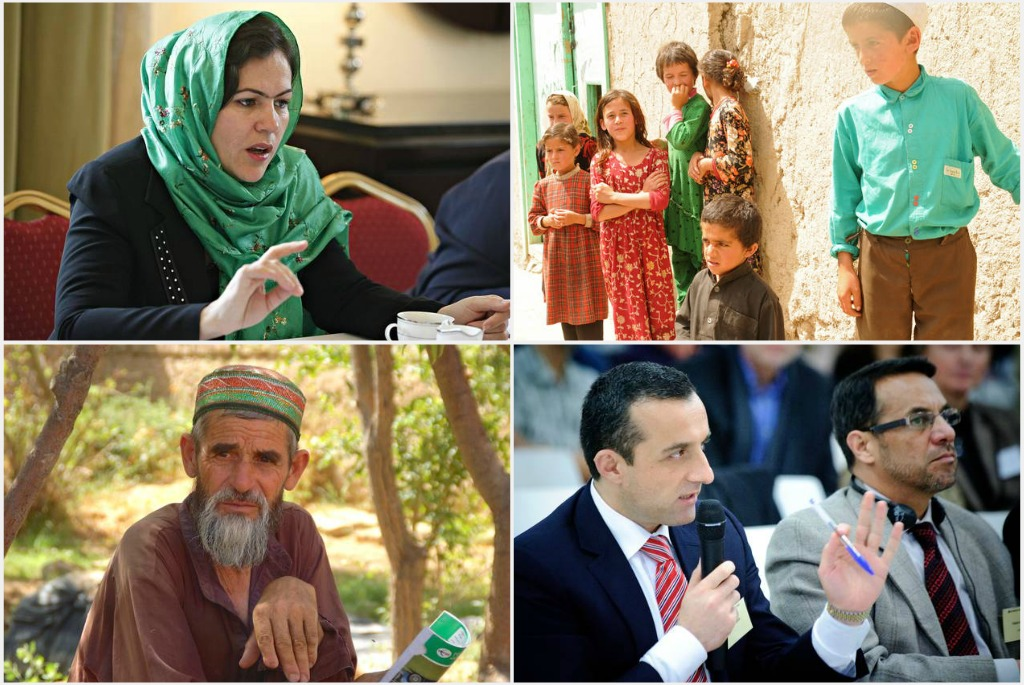
Tajiks of Afghanistan

In Afghanistan, a 'Tajik' is typically defined as any primarily Dari-speaking Sunni Muslim who refers to themselves by the region, province, city, town, or village from which they originate, such as Badakhshi, Baghlani, Mazari, Panjsheri, Kabuli, Herati, Kohistani, and others. The term "Tajik" is primarily a linguistic identity, with the use of Dari, a Persian dialect, serving as a primary marker of Tajik identity, even though Dari is widely used by other groups as well, including Hazaras, Aimaqs, Farsiwan, and others as a first or second language, which further complicates ethnic identification (see § Linguistic identification). Religious affiliation, predominantly Sunni Muslim of the Hanafi school, provides a secondary layer of shared identity but is less distinctive than among Shia communities like the Hazaras. Despite these complexities, Tajiks play a central role in Afghanistan's cultural, economic, and political life, particularly in urban regions, where they contribute to governance, trade, and culture.

The Tajiks are estimated to make up between 20% and 39% of the population, although precise figures are difficult to ascertain due to said lack of clear definition and distinction from other groups, but also due to migration, displacement, urbanization, and the absence of comprehensive ethnic censuses (see § Ethnic composition). Urbanization and the assimilation of other members of social groups like Pashtuns and the Uzbeks, particularly in Kabul and other major cities, have blurred distinctions between "native" Tajiks and mere persianized groups. Geographically, Tajiks are concentrated in the northeastern and northern provinces, including Badakhshan, Panjshir, Baghlan and Parwan, with substantial populations in urban centers such as Kabul, Herat, Mazar-i-Sharif, and Ghazni.

=== Hazara ===
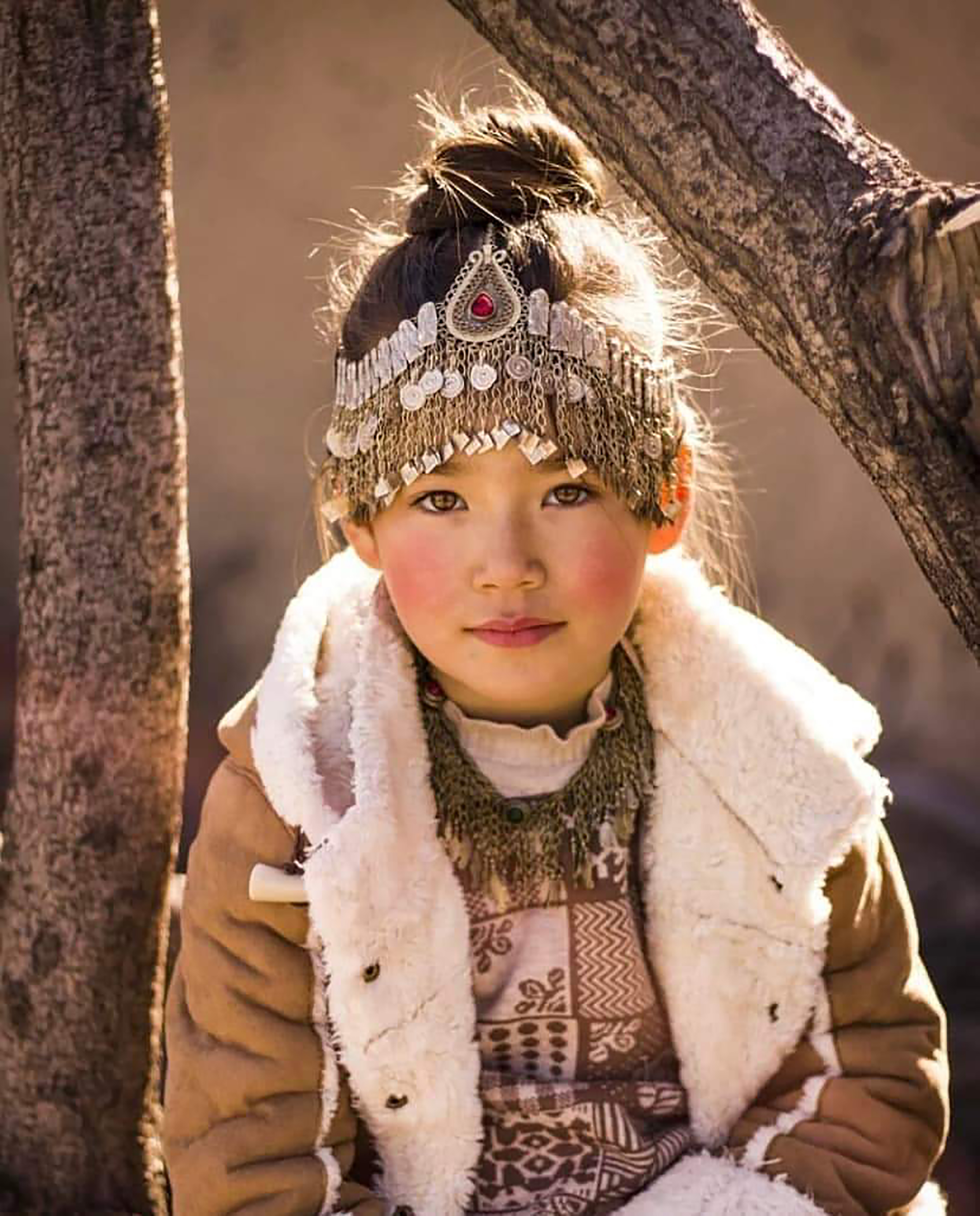
A Hazara girl in Afghanistan

The Hazaras are one of Afghanistan's major ethnic categories, primarily concentrated in central Afghanistan in the mountainous region known as Hazarajat, which includes Bamyan, Daikundi, and parts of Ghazni and Uruzgan. Urban Hazara communities are also found in Kabul, Mazar-i-Sharif, and Herat, participating in education, commerce, and professional sectors. Estimates of their population vary widely, from 3% to 19% of the total population depending on methodology and political context, reflecting the lack of reliable censuses, migration, displacement, and the effects of prolonged conflict (see § Ethnic composition).

Hazaras speak Hazaragi, a Persian dialect closely related to Dari that incorporates Turkic and Mongolic influences. Religious affiliation has historically been a key marker of Hazara identity. Most are Shia Muslims, though there are also Sunni and Isma'ili minorities. This combination of language, religion, and regional heritage produces a distinct social identity, differentiating Hazaras from other ethnic categories in Afghanistan.

The origins of Hazaras remain debated. Linguistic, historical, and anthropological evidence points to a complex ethnogenesis. Some theories suggest Mongol ancestry, including possible connections to Genghis Khan's armies and consecutive Mongol settlers, while others emphasize autochthonous Iranian roots or mixed Turkic heritage from successive waves of migration. Traditional Hazara society was organized around village communities with local leadership, though urbanization and migration have increasingly integrated Hazaras into national politics and urban life.

Hazaras endured significant persecution in the late 19th century under Emir Abdur Rahman Khan, including killings, enslavement, and forced displacement, events that continue to shape collective memory and social structures. In the 20th and 21st centuries, Hazaras actively participated in resistance movements against the Soviets and the Taliban, and later in governance within the post-2001 governments. Prominent Hazara figures include Abdul Ali Mazari, Karim Khalili, and Mohammad Mohaqiq. Despite progress in education, civil service, and public life, Hazaras still face socioeconomic challenges and security risks in some areas.

=== Uzbek ===
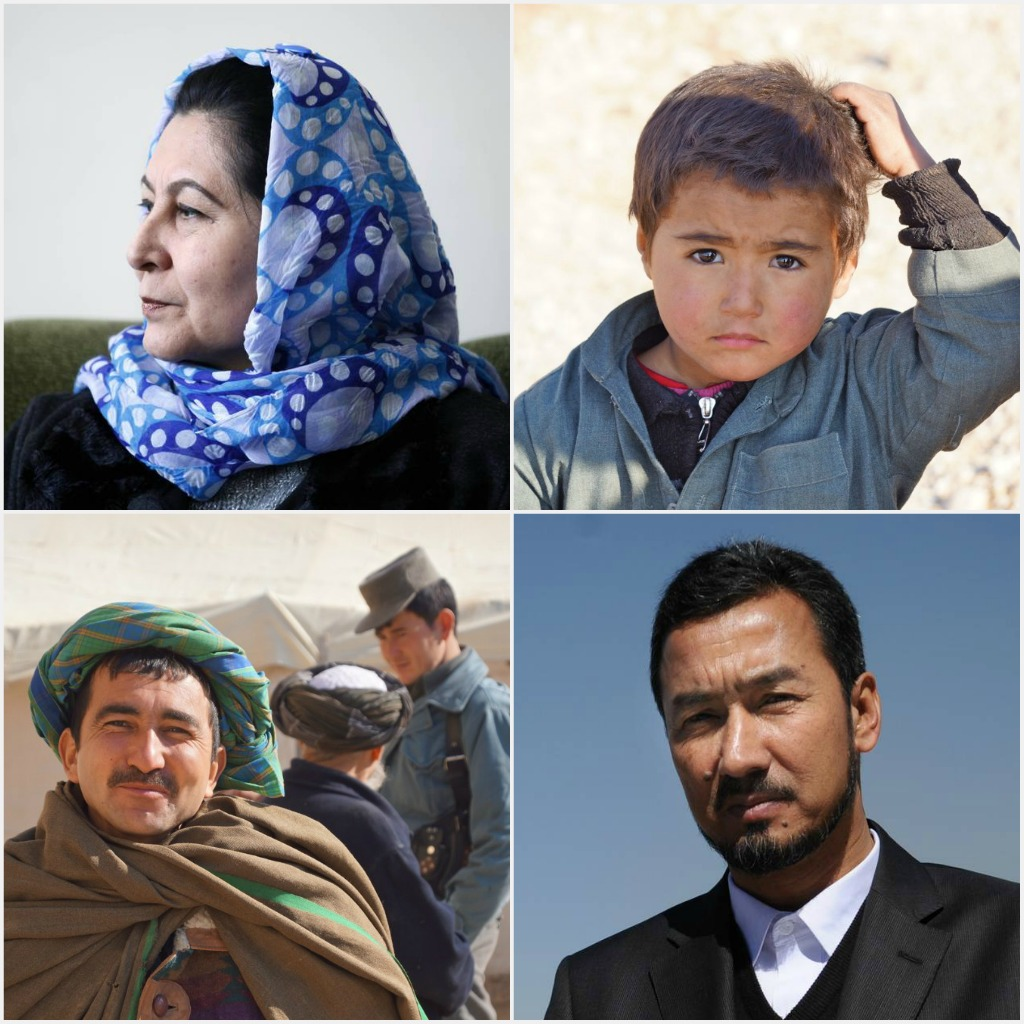
Uzbeks of Afghanistan

The Uzbeks are one of Afghanistan's significant ethnic categories, estimated to constitute between 3% and 10% of the population, though precise figures are difficult to determine due to unreliable censuses, migration, and displacement (see § Ethnic composition). They are primarily concentrated in northern Afghanistan, in provinces bordering Uzbekistan and Turkmenistan, such as Faryab, Jowzjan, Sar-e-Pol, and Balkh, with additional communities in Kunduz, Takhar, and Badakhshan. This northern region is often referred to as Turkic stronghold, where Uzbeks live alongside Turkmens, Tajiks, and Pashtuns.

Uzbeks speak Southern Uzbek and maintain cultural practices influenced by Turkic and Islamic traditions. Most are Sunni Muslims, aligning them religiously with the majority Pashtuns and Tajiks, though their Turkic linguistic and cultural identity varies in strength across different communities. Linguistic and urban assimilation, particularly in cities like Kabul, sometimes blurs these distinctions, as some Uzbeks adopt Dari or integrate into Persian-speaking urban identities.

Despite often being viewed as a single group, the Uzbek population is internally diverse, reflecting historical migration waves. Anthropologists distinguish between the Watani (also called Asli), descendants of 16th-century settlers organized in semi-independent chiefdoms, and the Mohajirin (also called Narg-e Bet or Yengi Geldi), descendants of migrants who arrived in the late 19th and early 20th centuries after the Russian conquest of Central Asia or as refugees from the Basmachi movement and Sovietization. The Watani are often tribal or regionally oriented, while the Mohajirin emphasize urban life, Islamic identity, and connections to Central Asia. These internal distinctions have historically prevented the emergence of a unified Uzbek identity in Afghanistan.

Historically, Uzbeks maintained clan- and kinship-based social structures and were largely rural, engaging in agriculture and animal husbandry. Urbanization, education, and integration into state institutions in the 20th and 21st centuries fostered increased visibility in politics, commerce, and urban society, especially in northern cities like Sheberghan and Mazar-i-Sharif. Nonetheless, regional, linguistic, and cultural distinctions continue to influence self-identification and community organization among Uzbeks.

== Minor ethnic categories ==
=== Turkmen ===
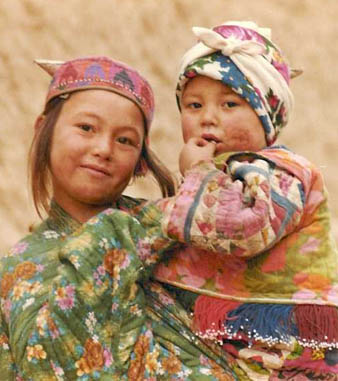
Turkmen girl and baby in Afghanistan

The Turkmens are a Turkic-speaking minority in Afghanistan, generally estimated to make up between 1% and 3% of the total population (see § Ethnic composition). They are primarily concentrated along the border with Turkmenistan in the northern provinces of Jowzjan, Faryab, Balkh, and Sar-e-Pol, with smaller communities in Kunduz and Badghis. Their settlements are often located among those of Uzbeks and Tajiks, reflecting a long history of coexistence and intermarriage.

As an Oghuz Turkic group, Turkmens share close cultural and linguistic affinities with their counterparts in Turkmenistan and speak various dialects of the Turkmen language. Historically, they were known for nomadic and semi-nomadic lifestyles based on pastoralism, horse breeding, and the production of carpets and textiles, which distinguished them from the Uzbeks, another Turkic group in Afghanistan who were traditionally sedentary. Over the 20th century, many Turkmens gradually transitioned to settled agricultural life, influenced in part by Afghan state policies encouraging sedentarization.

Most Turkmens adhere to Sunni Islam of the Hanafi school, shared with the majority of the Afghan population. Today, they participate in agriculture, local trade, and handicrafts, while some have integrated into urban centers, maintaining communal networks and traditional practices alongside broader economic and social engagement.

=== Baloch ===
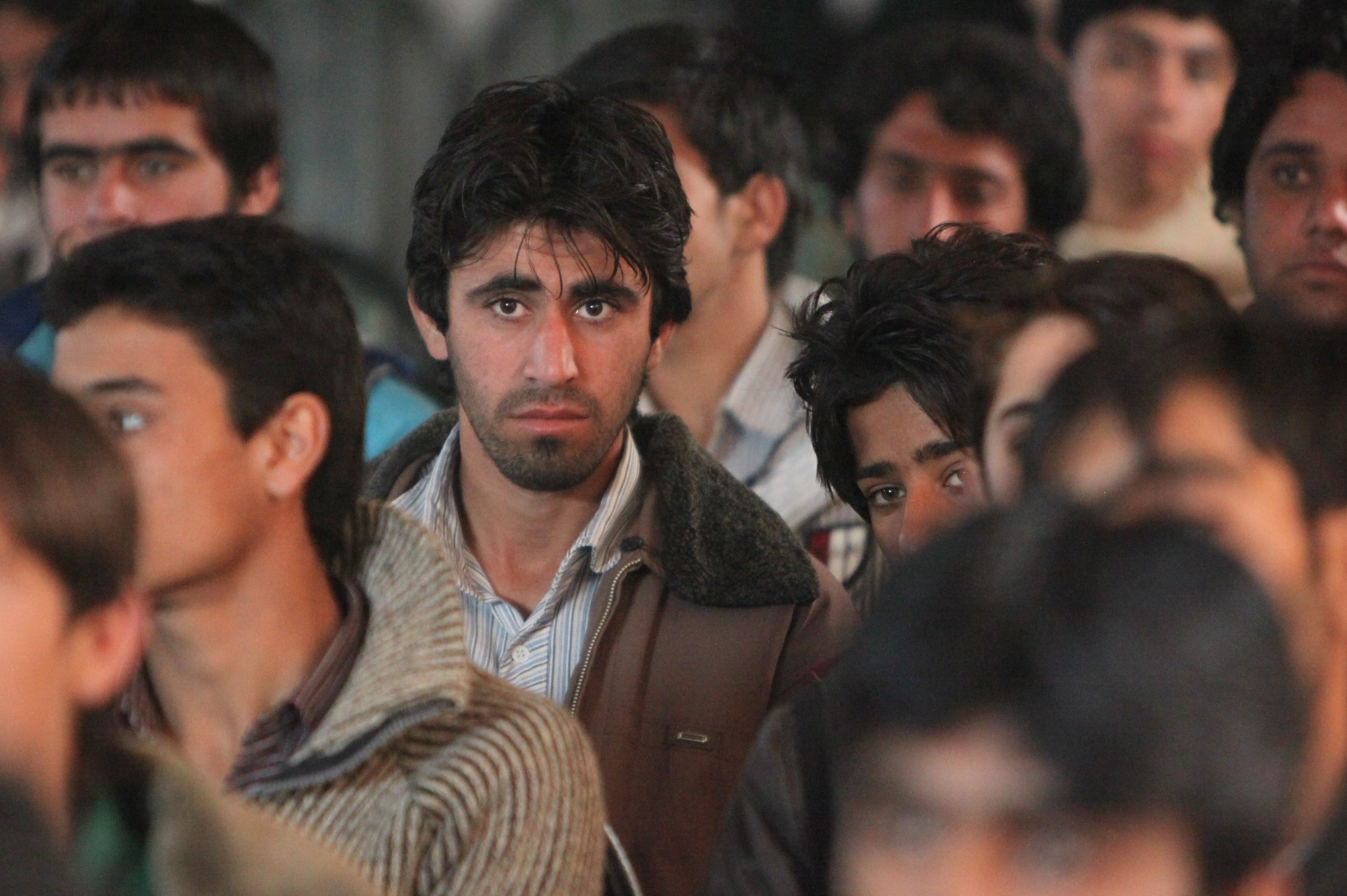
Balochs of Afghanistan

The Baloch are an ethnic minority in Afghanistan, estimated to comprise between less than 1% and 3% of the total population (see § Ethnic composition). They are primarily concentrated in the Balochistan region, spanning the southwestern provinces of Nimruz, Helmand, and Kandahar. Many Baloch settlements lie in sparsely populated desert and semi-desert areas along the borders with Iran and Pakistan, reflecting centuries of migration and cross-border tribal linkages with the larger Baloch populations of those neighboring states. Their livelihoods are based on a mix of agriculture, livestock herding, and seasonal trade.

The Baloch speak the Balochi language—a member of the Northwestern Iranian branch of the Indo-Iranian languages—which is divided into several dialects. Bilingualism in Pashto or Dari is common, particularly in trade and administration. Culturally, the Baloch maintain strong tribal structures organized under sardars (tribal chiefs), emphasizing values of honor, kinship, and hospitality that underpin social cohesion.

Historically, Baloch society was semi-nomadic, relying on pastoralism, camel herding, and limited farming, though many have gradually adopted a more settled lifestyle. The majority of Baloch in Afghanistan are Sunni Muslims, aligning them with the national religious majority. Nonetheless, their identity remains deeply influenced by tribal affiliations and transnational connections, which often transcend formal religious and linguistic boundaries.

=== Aimaq ===
The term Aimaq (from Turkic–Mongolic oymaq, meaning "tribe" or "group of tribes") does not denote a distinct ethnicity, but rather a social designation for semi-nomadic herding and agricultural tribal groups of mixed origins—including Hazara, Tajik, and Pashtun elements—that coalesced between the 16th and 17th centuries. They are estimated to constitute between less than 1% and 4% of Afghanistan's total population (see § Ethnic composition). Historically, the Aimaqs differed from the Tajiks and Farsiwan through their tribal and semi-nomadic organization, in contrast to the more urbanized and de-tribalized Tajik communities (for further detail, see § Lifestyle-based identification).

The Aimaqs speak a distinctive Persian dialect known as Aimaqi, which serves as a key marker of their collective identity. They are primarily concentrated in western and central Afghanistan, particularly in Badghis, Ghor, Herat, and Faryab. The term Chahar Aimaq ("Four Aimaqs") collectively refers to the four major tribal groups—Jamshidi, Firozkohi, Taymani, and Timuri—and is often used synonymously with Aimaq in historical and ethnographic sources.

Religiously, the Aimaqs are predominantly Sunni Muslims, distinguishing them from neighboring Shia Hazara communities. Despite growing urban migration and modern influences, Aimaq groups continue to preserve traditional cultural practices, dress, and social customs reflecting their tribal heritage. Their livelihoods have historically centered on pastoralism, herding, and small-scale agriculture, supported by strong local and tribal networks that remain integral to their social structure.

=== Nuristanis ===
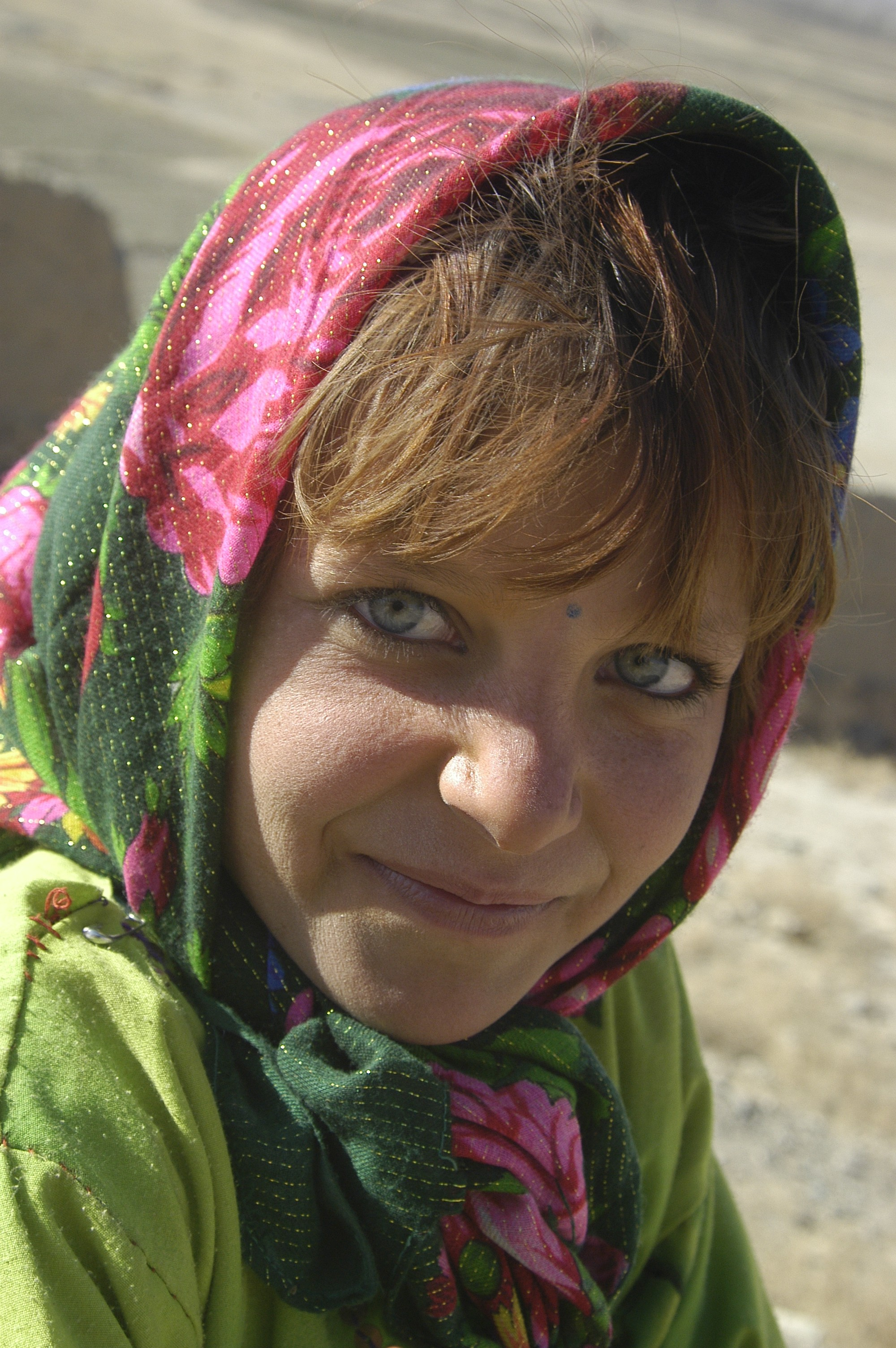
A Nuristani girl in Afghanistan

The Nuristanis are a small ethnic category in eastern Afghanistan, primarily concentrated in the mountainous Nuristan east of the Hindu Kush. Estimates suggest they make up between less than 1% and 4% of the national population (see § Ethnic composition). The term "Nuristani" collectively refers to several groups, including the Ashkun, Prasun, and Kalasha-ala, each with its own language, customs, and local affiliations. They are united by geography, historical conversion to Islam in the late 19th century, and their linguistic distinctiveness, as Nuristani languages form an independent branch of the Indo-Iranian family.

Historically, Nuristanis practiced a polytheistic, Vedic- or Hindu-like religion with Indo-Iranian elements (Note: Elements of ancient Indo-Iranian religion: Witzel (2004, p. 2): "an ancient, common substrate (TUITE 2000, cf. BENGTSON 1999, 2001, 2002). These must be separated from what may appear to be Vedic."; "A few key features that highlight the position of Hindukush religion in between the IIr. [Indo-Iranian], BMAC and Vedic religions will be summarized and discussed in some detail, as they by and large even now remain unknown to Vedic specialists, in spite of BUDDRUSS 1960 and the selective summary "d'un domaine mal connu des indianistes" by FUSSMAN (1977: 21-35), who, even with an "esprit hypercritique comme le nôtre" (1977: 27), overstresses (post-Vedic) Indian influences (1977: 69; for a balanced evaluation of the linguistic features, see now DEGENER 2002). However, both Hindukush and Vedic mythology, ritual, and festivals, in spite of many layers of developments and mutual influences, tend to explain each other very effectively; cf. the similar case of Nepal (Witzel 1997c: 520-32)."; Ruhland (2019, p. 107): "Their traditional shamanic religion is probably rooted in Indo-Iranian, pre-Zoroastrian Vedic traditions."; Vinogradov & Zharnikova (2020, p. 182): "... the pagan Kafir pantheon, which has preserved the relics of the most ancient Indo-Iranian mythological concepts."; Richard Strand, Peoples and Languages of Nuristan: "Before their conversion to Islâm the Nuristânis practised a form of ancient Hinduism, infused with accretions developed locally. They acknowledged a number of human-like deities who lived in the unseen Deity World (Kâmviri d'e lu; cf. Sanskrit deva lok'a-)"; West (2010, p. 357): "The Kalasha are a unique people living in just three valleys near Chitral, Pakistan, the capital of North-West Frontier Province, which borders Afghanistan. Unlike their neighbours in the Hindu Kush Mountains on both the Afghani and Pakistani sides of the border the Kalasha have not converted to Islam. During the mid-20th century a few Kalasha villages in Pakistan were forcibly converted to this dominant religion, but the people fought the conversion and, once official pressure was removed, the vast majority continued to practice their own religion. Their religion is a form of Hinduism that recognises many gods and spirits and has been related to the religion of the Ancient Greeks, who mythology says are the ancestors of the contemporary Kalash [...] However, it is much more likely, given their Indo-Aryan language, that the religion of the Kalasha is much more closely aligned to the Hinduism of their Indian neighbours than to the religion of Alexander the Great and his armies.) until conversion by Emir Abdur Rahman Khan in 1896, when the region was renamed from Kafiristan ("land of the non-believers") to Nuristan ("land of light"). Today, the vast majority are Sunni Muslims, though many pre-Islamic cultural practices and festivals continue to be observed alongside Islamic traditions.

Nuristanis traditionally live in small, autonomous villages with strong kinship networks and informal leadership. Social norms emphasize communal decision-making, honor, and hospitality. Economically, they rely on subsistence agriculture, livestock herding, forestry, and small-scale trade. The region's rugged terrain has historically limited external contact, preserving distinct cultural practices while also constraining integration into broader state structures. In recent decades, education, migration, and development initiatives have gradually increased engagement with wider Afghan society, though local identity, language, and cultural distinctiveness remain central to community life.

=== Arab ===
In contemporary Afghanistan, the term "Arab" refers primarily to an ancestral identity and communal memory rather than a distinct linguistic, cultural, or social group. The community is generally estimated at less than 1% to 2% of the total population (see § Ethnic composition). Most Afghan Arabs trace their ancestry to Arab traders, settlers, and soldiers who arrived over several centuries, especially during the early Islamic period. Their settlements are scattered, mainly in northern provinces such as Balkh, Kunduz, and Takhar, and in eastern Nangarhar, often living alongside Pashtuns, Tajiks, and other groups. While some reside in cities, most maintain a rural lifestyle centered on agriculture and livestock.

The Arab identity is closely associated with Sunni Islam, which serves as the main unifying factor and supports the continuation of traditional practices, including mosque-centered gatherings and observance of Islamic festivals. Culturally, Arabs have largely assimilated into the broader population, speaking Dari or Pashto as their first language, while Arabic is primarily retained for religious education. Community networks and family ties remain important, helping preserve traditional knowledge, cultural customs, and a sense of ancestral heritage. A small portion identify as Sayyid or Sadat, claiming descent from the Prophet Muhammad (see § Sadat).

== Other ethnic categories ==
Beyond the major and minor ethnic categories, Afghanistan is home to a wide range of smaller communities, each generally thought to constitute less than 1% of the population (see § Ethnic composition). Their presence reflects the position of Afghanistan at the crossroads of Central, South and West Asia, where waves of migration, trade and conquest left traces in the population makeup of the country.

=== Qizilbash ===
The Qizilbash are concentrated in urban centers like Kabul, Herat, Mazar-i-Sharif, and Kandahar. They trace their origins to Persia—modern-day Iran— during the Safavid era of the 18th century and later migrations, historically serving as military officers, administrators, and skilled craftsmen. Primarily Persian-speaking Twelver Shia Muslims, their identity combines religious affiliation with a legacy of service in governance. Unlike rural Shia groups such as the Hazaras, the Qizilbash have historically been urban, professional, and administratively oriented. Over time, they have largely integrated linguistically into Dari-speaking society while maintaining a distinct communal consciousness. Their social networks often revolve around familial ties, shared religious practices, and historical traditions of service.

=== Pashayi ===
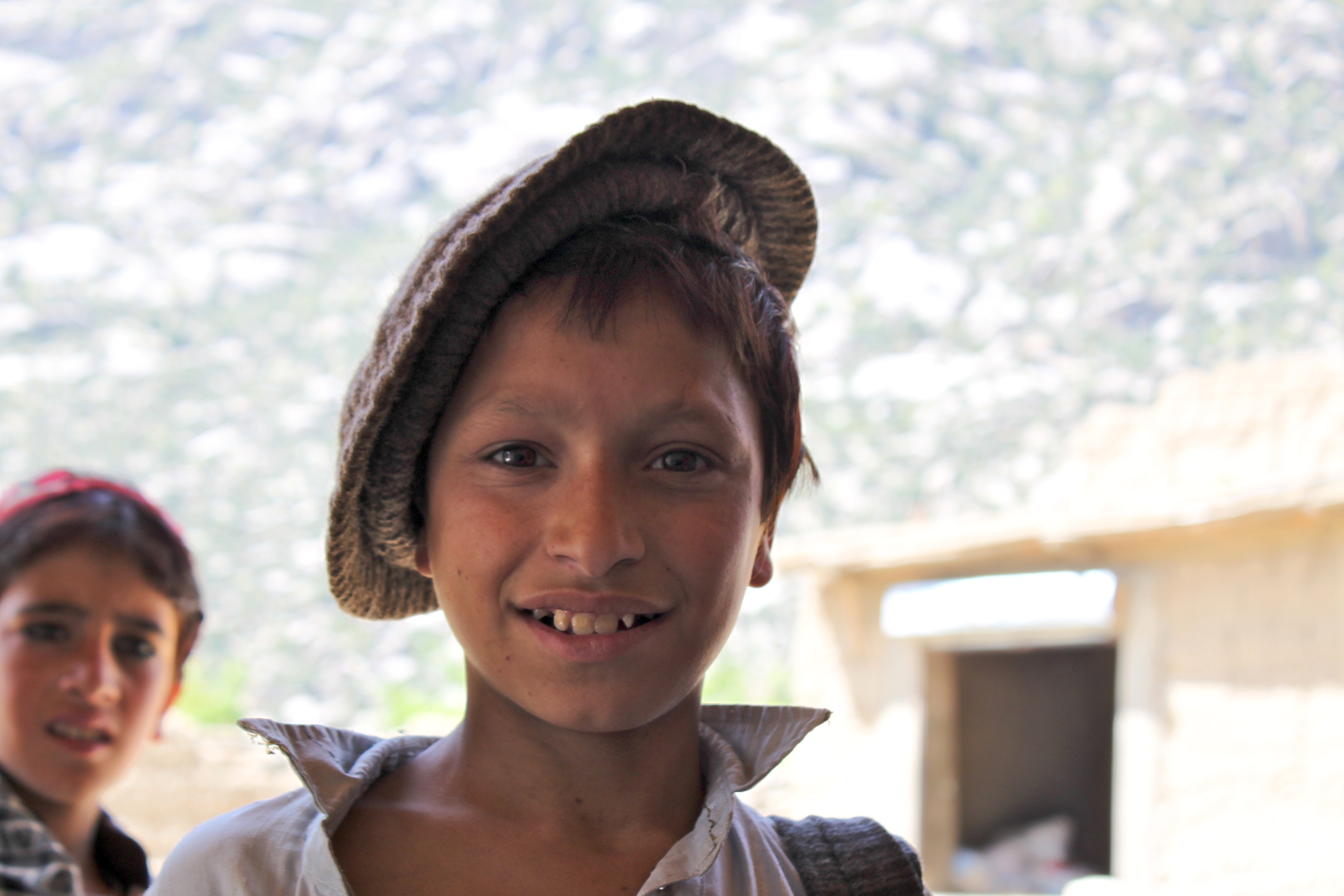
A Pashai boy wearing a pakol

The Pashayi mainly inhabit the mountainous eastern provinces of Laghman and Nangarhar, but also parts of Kunar, Kapisa, Parwan, Nuristan, and Panjshir. Historically grouped under the broader label "Kohistani", which loosely denoted various mountain-dwelling groups east of Kabul, they are now recognized for their distinct language and geographic identity.

The Pashayi speak the Pashayi languages, a separate branch of the Indo-Aryan family with multiple dialects shaped by the fragmented terrain, and are predominantly Sunni Muslims of the Hanafi school. Their communities are largely rural, organized around village networks and local elders, with livelihoods centered on subsistence farming and pastoralism. Cultural practices and language serve as key markers of identity, helping maintain cohesion despite geographic isolation and historical marginalization within the broader Afghan social landscape.

=== Sadat and Sayyid ===
The status of the Sadat as an ethnic category is disputed, as they are often regarded more as a religious-genealogical group than a distinct ethnicity. They claim descent from the Prophet Muhammad through Ali and Fatima, and are dispersed across northern provinces such as Herat, Balkh, and Kunduz, as well as central and southern provinces including Kabul and Nangarhar. The term "Sayyid", often used interchangeably with Sadat, denotes this claimed lineage. Most Sadat are linguistically and culturally assimilated into larger populations, including Arabs, Hazaras, Tajiks, and Pashtuns. Their religious affiliation is predominantly Sunni Islam, with a minority Shia community. Traditionally, Sadat families have held respected roles as religious scholars, judges, and community leaders, giving them influence that transcends their small numbers.

=== Kyrgyz ===
The Kyrgyz inhabit the high-altitude Wakhan Corridor in Badakhshan, living in small, remote communities. They speak Kyrgyz language and are primarily Sunni Muslims. Historically nomadic pastoralists, they herded yaks and sheep across the Pamir Mountains, maintaining seasonal migration patterns and strong ties to clan-based networks. Many Kyrgyz migrated to Kyrgyzstan or Turkey following the onset of conflict in the 1970s, but those who remain continue traditional lifestyles, with limited integration into broader Afghan society due to their geographic isolation, making them one of the most geographically and culturally distinct communities in Afghanistan.

=== Gujar ===
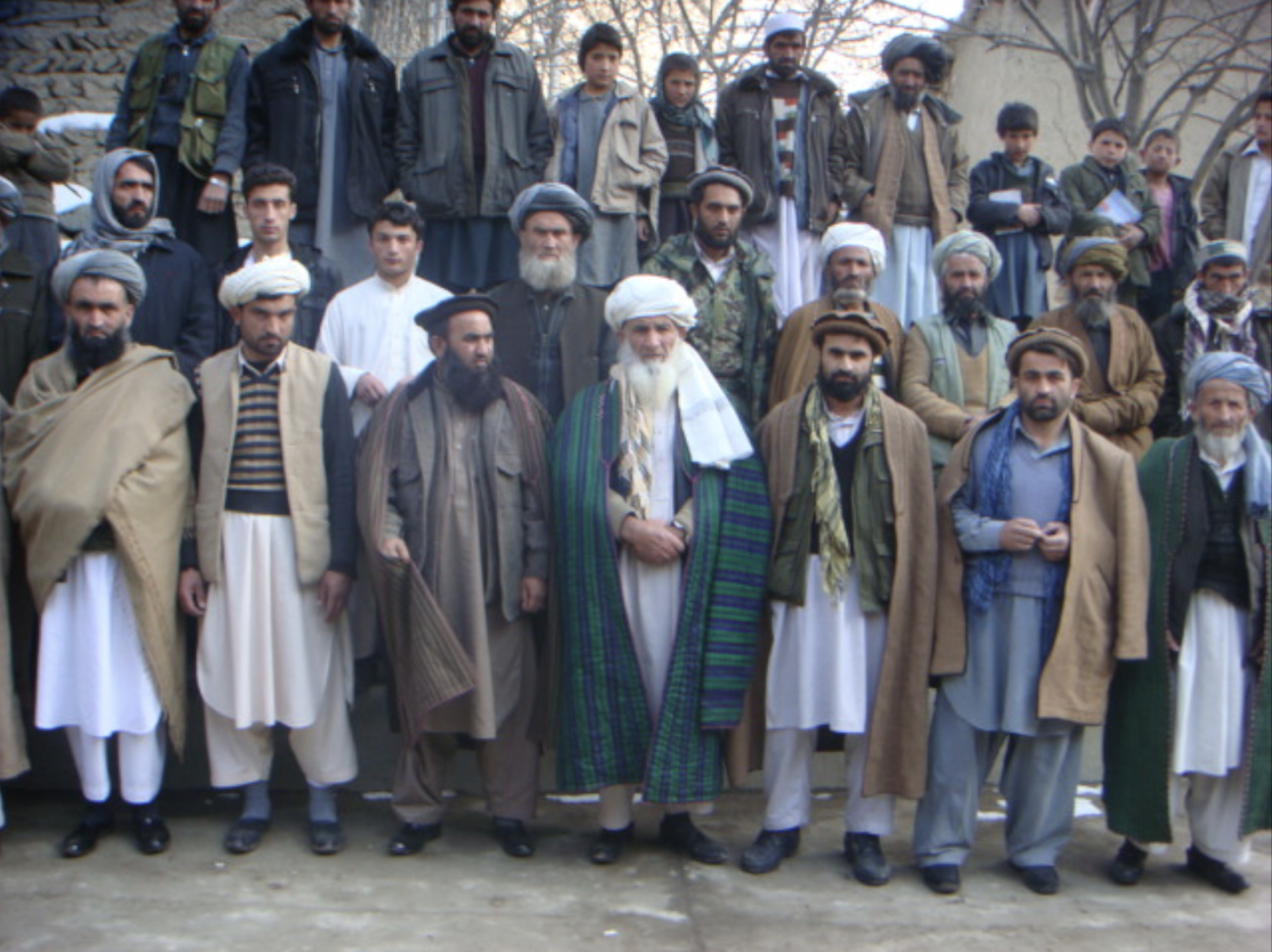
Gathering of Gujar tribal people in northern Afghanistan

The Gujar are a semi-nomadic, pastoral community primarily found in provinces within the Kunar valley in northeastern Afghanistan. Internal displacement due to conflict has occasionally disrupted their communities, but traditional identities persist. Traditionally herders of cattle and buffalo, many Gujar today combine pastoralism with settled agriculture, maintaining distinct cultural practices and social organization.

Their origins trace to broader Gujar populations across Central and South Asia, including Pakistan and northern India. In Afghanistan, they commonly speak the official languages Pashto or Dari, while some retain their native Gojri language, an Indo-Aryan language related to Rajasthani. The Gujars are Sunni Muslims, integrated into the wider Afghan religious landscape, yet their tribal networks, mobility patterns, and localized customs distinguish them from surrounding ethnic groups.

=== Pamiri ===
The term "Pamiri" is a collective and geographic term for several Eastern Iranian-speaking communities living in the Pamir Mountains and the Wakhan Corridor of Badakhshan. These include speakers of Shughni, Wakhi, Ishkashimi and related languages, each maintaining distinct local traditions. Historically known as "Mountain Tajiks" or "Galcha", they are culturally and linguistically separate from the lowland Tajiks. Pamiri communities are predominantly Nizari Isma'ili Shia Muslims, a faith that strongly shapes their social structure and religious leadership. They live in village-based societies, relying on agriculture, herding and small-scale trade adapted to high-altitude conditions. Dress, architecture and craftsmanship vary by valley, with characteristic regional styles—especially in headwear—serving as subtle ethnic markers that distinguish one community from the next.

=== Brahui ===
The Brahui inhabit southern Nimruz and adjacent border areas with Iran and Pakistan. They speak the Brahui language, a Dravidian language that stands out in an otherwise Indo-Iranian linguistic environment, making it one of the rarest linguistic enclaves in Afghanistan. Historically organized along tribal and pastoral lines, the Brahui have long practiced small-scale agriculture and animal herding. Centuries of interaction with neighboring Baloch communities have led to widespread bilingualism in Balochi, as well as gradual cultural blending. Despite this, Brahui identity remains tied to kinship networks and oral traditions that preserve elements of their distinct heritage. The Brahui are predominantly Sunni Muslims, sharing religious affiliation with most southern Afghan groups while maintaining their own local customs and leadership structures.

=== Other ===
Turkic minorities include small numbers of Tatars and Kazakh living in the northern provinces and the highlands of the Pamir Mountains. Kazakh communities, once larger, have largely assimilated into Uzbek and Turkmen populations. Among Persian- and other Iranian-speaking groups are the Parachi, who inhabit secluded valleys of Kapisa, and the Ormuri, speakers of an archaic Iranic tongue in Logar and Paktia. The Moghols, descendants of Mongol soldiers, have lost their original Mongolic language and are now fully integrated into Dari-speaking society.

South Asian–related populations include the Jats and other peripatetic groups historically linked to pastoralism, itinerant work, and caravan trade. Afghanistan also hosts small Hindu and Sikh communities—formerly active in trade in Kabul, Jalalabad and Ghazni—whose numbers have declined sharply due to emigration in the late 20th century. The country's historic Jewish community, once centered in Herat and Kabul, has nearly disappeared through migration to Israel. Hindus, Sikhs, and Jews are religious communities rather than ethnic categories, distinguished by faith and social roles rather than language or descent (see § Religious identification).

== Ethnic composition ==
=== Caveats on reliability of estimates ===
Estimates of ethnic composition of Afghanistan are inherently uncertain and vary widely due to methodological and historical factors No comprehensive census has ever included ethnicity, and the last nationwide population count was conducted in 1979, long before modern institutions or systematic surveys could capture demographic diversity. Available figures rely on surveys, historical accounts, and academic studies, each using different definitions, methods, and selection criteria. Some classify people by language, others by self-identification, and still others by historical, political, or administrative considerations, leading to widely divergent numbers.

Ethnic categories themselves are socially constructed and historically contingent (see § History of ethnic categorization in Afghanistan). Overlaps with other forms of social identity—such as language, religion, urban/rural residence, and lifestyle—further reduce the reliability of statistics (see § Identification by other social affiliations). Decades of war since the 1970s, refugee movements, urbanization, and internal resettlement have shifted the geographic distribution and composition of groups, making static figures unreliable. Moreover, political actors have historically used demographic data strategically, influencing how population numbers are presented and interpreted (see § Politicization of ethnicity in Afghanistan).

Scholars generally agree that the ethnic composition of the country should be understood as both uncertain and contested. The very practice of defining ethnicity in the country is relatively recent, emerging mainly in the 20th century and gaining political significance primarily during the Afghan conflict. Presenting multiple perspectives, rather than relying on a single set of numbers, reflects the complexity of Afghan social realities more accurately.

=== Estimated ethnic composition (in percent) ===
Ethnicity	Major ethnic categories	Minor ethnic categories

Period	Pashtun	Tajik/ Farsiwan	Hazara	Uzbek	Turkmen	Baloch	Aimaq	Nuristani	Arab	Others

post-2021 (Islamic Emirate)	40 – 50	25 – 27	9 – 18	6 – 15	2 – 3	–	–	–	–	–
2022 EUAA	40 – 50	25 – 27	9 – 18	6 – 15	1.5 – 3	–	–	–	–	–

2004–2021 (Islamic Republic)	37 – 46	25 – 39	6 – 19	5 – 9	1 – 3	0 – 3	0 – 4	0 – 4	0 – 2	∅
2021 MRG	42	27	9	9	3	2	–	–	–	∅
2021 AF	40 (Note: excl. <0.5% Alokozay, <0.5% Noorziaye, <0.5% Stanikzai, and <0.5% Afghan.)	39	11	5	1 (Note: excl. <0.5% Bayat.)	<0.5	1 (Note: excl. <0.5% Jamshidi and <0.5% Temori.)	1	<0.5	∅ (Note: incl. 1% Sadat, <0.5% Qizilbash, <0.5% Kyrgyz, <0.5% Pashayi, <0.5% Gujar, <0.5% Khwaja, <0.5% Tatar and <0.5% Wakhi.)
2019 AF	39	37	11	8	1	<0.5	<0.5 (Note: excl. <0.5% Jamshidi and <0.5% Temori.)	1	1	∅ (Note: incl. 1% Sadat, 1% Pashayi, <0.5% Qizilbash, <0.5% Kyrgyz, and <0.5% Gujar.)
2019 FW	42	27	9	9	∅	∅	∅	∅	–	∅ (Note: incl. Kyrgyz.)
2018 AF	37 (Note: excl. <0.5% Afghan.)	37	10	9	2	1	1	1	1	∅ (Note: incl. 1% Sadat, <0.5% Qizilbash, <0.5% Pashayi, <0.5% Gujar, <0.5% Wakhi, 1% "Don't know", <0.5% "Refused", and <0.5% "Nothing".)
2017 AF	37 (Note: excl. <0.5% Afghan.)	37	11	9	2 (Note: excl. <0.5% Bayat.)	<0.5	1 (Note: excl. <0.5% Temori.)	1	1	∅ (Note: incl. 1% Sadat, <0.5% Qizilbash, <0.5% Pashayi, <0.5% Gujar, <0.5% Khwaja, and <0.5% Brahui.)
2015 AF	40 (Note: excl. <0.5% Safi, <0.5% Sahak, <0.5% Alokozay, <0.5% Popalzay, and <0.5% Kharoti.)	34	11	8	2 (Note: excl. <0.5% Bayat.)	1	1	1	1	∅ (Note: incl. 1% Sadat, <0.5% Sayyid, <0.5% Pashayi, <0.5% Gujar, and 1% "Don't know".)
2014 AF	40 (Note: excl. <0.5% Safi.)	36	10	8	2	1	1	1	1	∅ (Note: incl. 1% Sadat, 1% Pashayi, and <0.5% Qizilbash.)
2013 AF	43	32	10	7	2	1	1	1	2	∅ (Note: incl. 1% Sadat.)
2013 CIA	42	27	9	9	3	2	4	–	–	∅
2012 AF	40	33	11	9	2	1	1	1	2	∅ (Note: incl. 1% Sadat, 1% Pashayi, also Qizilbash, and Kyrgyz.)
2011 AF	41	32	11	9	2	1	1	1	1	∅ (Note: incl. 1% Sadat, also Pashayi, Qizilbash, and Kyrgyz.)
2010 AF	42	31	10	9	2	1	2	1	2	∅ (Note: incl. Pashayi, and Kyrgyz.)
2010 FW	40	25	15	5	∅	∅	∅	∅	–	∅ (Note: incl. Kyrgyz.)
2009 FW	40	25	15	5	∅	∅	∅	∅	–	∅ (Note: incl. Kyrgyz.)
2009 ABC	40	37	11	7	2	1	∅	1	2	∅ (Note: incl. "No opinion".)
2007 ABC	38	38	6	6	2	3	0	4	0	∅ (Note: incl. 2% "No opinion", and 1% "Other".)
2007 AF	40	35	10	8	3	1	1	1	1	0
2007 WA	42	27	9	9	–	–	–	–	–	–
2006 AF	41	37	9	9	2	1	0	0	1	0
2006 FW	40	25	15	5	–	–	–	–	–	∅
2006 ABC (Note: The provinces of Zabul, Uruzgan, and Nuristan were not sampled directly for security or accessibility issues. Despite this, ABC News states that the survey results remain nationally representative. The total population share of these provinces lies within the stated ±3.5% margin of error.)	42	37	12	5	3	0	0	0	0	∅ (Note: incl. 1% "Other", also "No opinion".)
2006 DS	38 – 44	25	10	6 – 8	∅	∅	∅	–	–	∅
2005 DS	38 – 44	25	10 – 19	6 – 8	∅	∅	∅	–	–	∅
2005 ABC	40	37	13	6	1	0	0	0	0	∅ (Note: incl. 3% "Other", also "No opinion".)
2004 AF	46	39	6	6	1	0	–	1	1	1
2004 DS	38	25	19	6	∅	∅	∅	–	–	∅
2004 EB	42	27	9	9	3	–	4	–	–	∅
2004 ABC (Note: The provinces of Uruzgan, Ghor, and Nimruz were not sampled directly for security or accessibility issues. Despite this, ABC News states that the survey results remain nationally representative, as the total population share of these provinces lies within the stated ±3.5% margin of error.)	46	39	6	6	1	0	0	0	0	∅ (Note: incl. 3% "Other".)

1992–2004 (Islamic State)	38 – 44	25 – 28	8 – 19	5 – 9	3	∅	∅	∅	–	∅
2003 FW	40	25	15	5	∅	∅	∅	∅	–	∅ (Note: incl. Kyrgyz.)
2003 WA	44	25	10	8	–	–	–	–	–	–
2000 FW	40	25	15	5	∅	∅	∅	∅	–	–
1998 FW	40	25	15	5	∅	∅	∅	∅	–	–
1997 LC	40	25.3	18	6.3	2.5	–	–	–	–	∅ (Note: incl. 1% Qizilbash.)
1996 FW	40	25	15	5	∅	∅	∅	∅	–	–
1995 FW	43	28	8	9	3	∅	∅	∅	–	–
1993 FW	43	28	8	9	∅	∅	∅	∅	–	–
1993 WA	38	25	19	6	–	–	–	–	–	–
1992 CIA	38	25	19	6	∅	∅	∅	–	–	∅

1979–1992 (Democratic Republic)	50 – >60	20 – 30	3 – 15	5 – 9	∅	∅	∅	∅	–	∅
1991 CIA	50	25	12 – 15	9	∅	∅	∅	–	–	∅
1991 FW	>50	20	9	9	∅	∅	∅	∅	–	–
1988 FW	>50	25 – 30	3	5	–	∅	∅	∅	–	–
1986 FW	>50	25 – 30	3	5	–	∅	∅	∅	–	–
1985 FW	>50	25 – 30	3	5	–	∅	∅	∅	–	–
1984 WA	50	25	9	9	–	–	–	–	–	–
1984 FW	>50	25 – 30	3	5	–	∅	∅	∅	–	–
1982 FW	>60	25 – 30	3	5	–	∅	∅	∅	–	–
1981 FW	>60	25 – 30	3	5	–	∅	∅	∅	–	–
1981 CIA	50	25	9	9	∅	∅	∅	–	–	∅

pre-1979 (Kingdom)	54 – >60	25 – 37	3	5 – 6	∅	∅	∅	∅	–	–
1979 FW	>60	25 – 30	3	5	–	∅	∅	∅	–	–
1978 FW	>60	25 – 30	3	5	–	∅	∅	∅	–	–
1978 WA	60	30	∅	>5	–	–	–	–	–	–
1969 FW	60	30	3	6	∅	∅	∅	∅	–	–
1951 WA	53.5	36.7	3	6	–	–	–	–	–	–

Legend:
- ∅: Ethnicity mentioned in source but not quantified
- –: Ethnicity not mentioned specifically
- Source abbreviations: Empirical sources: AF – Asia Foundation survey, ABC – ABC News/BBC/ARD opinion poll, Government sources: CIA – CIA World Factbook, DS – U.S. Department of State, EUAA – European Union Agency for Asylum, LC – U.S. Library of Congress, Editorial sources: EB – Encyclopædia Britannica, FW – Der Fischer Weltalmanach, MRG – Minority Rights Group, WA – The World Almanac.

== Identification by other social affiliations ==
In Afghanistan, social identity has historically been multidimensional, with ethnic affiliation playing a relatively limited role in the everyday lives of most people. Prior to the outbreak of the Afghan war in 1979 and the civil war of the 1990s, social belonging was primarily structured around local, regional, tribal, and religious networks. Ethnic labels were often applied externally and were rarely adopted as primary markers of self-identification.

Although the wars and mass displacement of the late 20th century increased the prominence of ethnicity, pre-existing forms of social identification continued to shape both self-perception and external classification. In contemporary times, scholars and political analysts frequently consider these overlapping affiliations—including regional origin, lifestyle, language, religion, and urbanity—alongside or even instead of ethnic identity. This highlights the complex, context-dependent, and dynamic nature of social identity in Afghanistan.

=== Identification as Afghan ===
The emergence of a national Afghan identity is a relatively recent and fragile phenomenon. Traditionally, the term "Afghan" referred almost exclusively to Pashtuns, and well into the 19th and early 20th centuries, it remained largely synonymous with Pashtun identity. The modern concept of a unified Afghan nation was unevenly internalized, as different groups tended to identify primarily through family, clan, tribe, region or religion rather than as members of a nation-state.

A significant shift occurred during the Afghan war. The collapse of state institutions, widespread violence and mass displacement fundamentally altered patterns of identification. Refugee movements were particularly influential, as Afghans living in exile experienced their country from the outside and began to perceive Afghanistan as a single territorial entity. This shift fostered a broader national consciousness that had been largely absent in earlier periods.

The development of this collective sense of nationhood, often referred to as Afghaniyat or "Afghanness", has been shaped by the interplay of cultural identities, social dynamics, and traditional norms, guiding how individuals and communities relate to the Afghan nation as a shared imagined community. Central to this identity, alongside other national symbols of Afghanistan, has been an attachment to the territorial integrity of the state, with the map of Afghanistan becoming a prominent symbol across ethnic and ideological lines.

Nation-building efforts, such as centralized education, conscription and official language policies have promoted a sense of Afghan national belonging, though these initiatives often competed with strong local or ethnic loyalties. In urban centers like Kabul, exposure to state institutions and diverse populations sometimes reinforced national identification, whereas in rural or peripheral areas, allegiance to local networks frequently remained more important. This process also involved the gradual de-Pashtunization of the national concept, as non-Pashtun groups increasingly adopted the label "Afghan". Today, surveys indicate that a significant proportion of Afghans express pride in belonging to Afghanistan, e. g. a nationwide poll conducted in 2009 found that 72% of respondents identified primarily as Afghans.

=== Tribal identification ===
Tribal affiliation has long been one of the most enduring and influential forms of social identification in Afghanistan, particularly among Pashtun, Turkmen, and some Baloch and Uzbek populations. Tribal structures historically provided the main framework for social organization, governance, and protection, especially in rural areas where state authority was weak or absent. Belonging to a tribe (qawm) offered social security, political representation, and access to economic and kinship networks, shaping individual identity, behavior, and status within the community.

Among Pashtuns, tribal identification is particularly significant, organized through patrilineal descent into tribes, subtribes (khel), clans (zai), and extended families (kor). The Pashtunwali code of honor and conduct reinforces this structure, regulating hospitality, loyalty, justice, and revenge. Tribal leaders or elders (maliks or khans) mediate disputes, represent members in local councils (jirgas), and maintain cohesion through consensus-based decision-making. Even today, tribal affiliations influence political alliances, electoral behavior, and social mobility, especially in southern and eastern Afghanistan.

Non-Pashtun groups also retain forms of tribal or clan-based identification, though often less rigidly organized. Among Hazaras, kinship networks and local identities sometimes function similarly to tribes, particularly in rural central Afghanistan. Turkmens and Uzbeks maintain clan affiliations (urug, tayfa), historically shaping marriage alliances, leadership roles, and land use. While modernization, urbanization, and displacement have weakened tribal authority in many regions, tribal identity remains a salient marker of belonging and social influence.

=== Linguistic identification ===
Language is one of several criteria by which groups and individuals in Afghanistan may be classified or classify themselves. Because language is immediately perceptible in social interaction, it is frequently used as an indicator of regional origin, social environment, or cultural affiliation. This classification is complicated by widespread multilingualism, as many Afghans grow up speaking multiple languages and use them in different contexts, blurring boundaries between linguistic and ethnic categories.

Several groups illustrate the divergence between ethnic identity and first language. Among Pashtuns, Pashto is considered the ancestral language, yet many communities in Kabul, Herat, Balkh, Uruzgan, Nimruz, and parts of Nangarhar now speak Dari as their mother tongue while maintaining a Pashtun identity. Similarly, some Baloch speak Pashto, while some Pashtuns in the southwest speak Balochi—yet all continue to recognize their original tribal or ethnic belonging. Comparable patterns exist among Uzbeks, Pashayi, Gujars, and Arabs, many of whom have shifted to Dari or Pashto without abandoning their ethnic identities. For example, roughly one-third of Uzbeks in Afghanistan speak Dari as their primary language while still identifying as Uzbek.

Especially the category "Tajik" (or Farsiwan, literally meaning "Persian-speaker") illustrates the linguistic rather than ethnic basis of such classifications. It broadly encompasses all non-Hazara Dari speakers, including Aimaq, Qizilbash, Arabs, even Pamiri speakers in Badakhshan and other "persianized" or assimilated people like Dari-speaking Baloch, Uzbeks, and Safi Pashtuns. Many of these groups historically did not identify as Tajik, highlighting how the designation functions as a linguistic umbrella term rather than a discrete ethnic category. Therefore, while language shapes social interaction and classification, it is not a reliable indicator of ethnicity in Afghanistan.

=== Local/regional identification ===
In Afghanistan, regional and local identities have historically been at least as significant as ethnic categories. Many Afghans—especially those without tribal affiliation, like Tajiks—primarily identify through their region, province, or city of origin rather than ethnic labels, emphasizing territorial belonging and shared cultural environments over abstract ethnic affiliation.

For instance, a resident of Kabul may describe themselves simply as Kabuli, highlighting urban culture and neighborhood networks rather than ethnicity. In Herat, inhabitants often call themselves Herati, reflecting attachment to local traditions and historical urban identity. Likewise, someone from Kandahar would identify as Kandahari, while in the north, residents of Panjshir commonly describe themselves as Panjshiri, signaling the social networks and kinship patterns of the province rather than a broader Tajik category.

The administrative divisions of Afghanistan are not primarily defined in ethnic terms and have long enjoyed significant provincial and local autonomy. The modern provincial system, established in 1964, aligns closely with these patterns of identification. In recent decades, Afghans increasingly name their province when describing their origins rather than referencing ethnicity or broader regional affiliation. Regional and local identities influence political alliances, marriage patterns, and social networks, often undermining externally imposed ethnic categorizations and demonstrating that lived identities are more closely tied to territorial and local structures than to abstract ethnospheres.

=== Urban/rural identification ===
The distinction between urban and rural populations is an important social marker in Afghanistan. In cities such as Kabul, Herat and Mazar-i-Sharif, urban dwellers often perceive themselves as more cosmopolitan and socially distinct from rural populations, regardless of ethnic affiliation. Urban identification in these centers tends to be ethnically neutral, shaped by shared experiences of city life, access to institutions and services, frequent use of Dari as a marker of social refinement, and the gradual entrenchment of de-tribalized lifestyles across ethnic and tribal groups. For example, Kabul hosts Pashtuns, Tajiks, Hazaras, and others living side by side. Access to universities, professional employment, and government institutions fosters a "modern elite" whose social standing is tied more to education and urbanity than to ethnic background.

By contrast, rural communities are often organized around tribal, kinship, or village-based networks, emphasizing local autonomy, tradition, and collective decision-making. These urban–rural distinctions can sometimes outweigh ethnic considerations, shaping perceptions of social status, political legitimacy, and cultural orientation. Rural Afghans may perceive urban elites—even those of their own ethnicity—as detached, overly influenced by foreign ideas, and disconnected from the realities of village life.

=== Religious identification ===
Religious affiliation has historically been a central axis of social identification in Afghanistan. The vast majority of Afghans are Muslims, predominantly Sunni of the Hanafi school, while a significant minority adheres to Shiism, including Twelver Shia (notably among Hazaras) and Ismailis. In many contexts, religious identity has had more immediate social and political relevance than ethnicity. For instance, the label "Hazara" has historically been used interchangeably with Shiite, demonstrating how religion could define group boundaries more strongly than language or region. Beyond Islam, small religious minorities—including Hindus, Sikhs, and Jews—have historically formed distinct communities, whose identities were primarily defined by religion rather than ethnicity.

=== Lifestyle-based identification ===
Historically, lifestyle categories played a major role in how people in Afghanistan identified themselves and were classified by others. Afghan society traditionally distinguished between sedentary, semi-nomadic, and nomadic populations, distinctions that often cut across ethnic boundaries. Many groups that are now partially or fully sedentary once led nomadic or semi-nomadic lives. For example, Turkmens and Kyrgyz were historically nomadic pastoralists, while Uzbeks, Pashtuns, and various Persian-speaking groups included substantial semi-nomadic segments.

In pre-war periods, labels such as "Tajik", "Aimaq", and "Kochi" were often used less as ethnic markers than as indicators of lifestyle or social organization. Persian-speaking nomadic or semi-nomadic groups were frequently called "Aimaq", "Kochi" referred to Pashtun nomads practicing seasonal migrations, and "Tajik" typically denoted sedentary Persian-speakers, regardless of deeper genealogical origin.

Over the 20th century, state consolidation, enclosure of pastures, and socio-economic changes led to a sharp decline in nomadism. Consequently, these older lifestyle-based distinctions have become far less relevant in everyday life. This shift also affected classification. The Aimaq, for instance, are increasingly considered part of the broader Tajik or Farsiwan category in both popular and administrative usage. In contrast, early administrative documents and statistics often listed groups like Kochi or Aimaq explicitly as lifestyle categories rather than ethnic groups, reflecting the historical significance of lifestyle in shaping social identity. Because these categories historically encompassed multiple linguistic and genealogical backgrounds, they are generally not considered ethnic groups, even though they frequently appear alongside ethnic labels in historical sources.

== Politicization of ethnicity in Afghanistan ==
Ethnicity in Afghanistan has historically served not only as a social identifier but also as a strategic instrument for political organization. Ethnic categories have generally been fluid and context-dependent (see § Identification by other social affiliations), and their significance has often shifted according to political, ideological, and historical circumstances. These categories have been deliberately instrumentalized to negotiate power, secure representation, and organize both state and non-state structures.

=== Ethnic dynamics during the monarchy (pre-1978) ===
Under Emir Abdur Rahman Khan (1880–1901), Afghanistan experienced a process of centralization that included tribal resettlement, migration policies, and administrative restructuring. These measures aimed to strengthen central governance and manage local resistance, affecting communities such as the Hazaras across different regions. The policies significantly shaped the evolving relationship between ethnic groups and state authority, particularly in northern and frontier areas.

During the reign of King Mohammad Zahir Shah (1933–1973), the government promoted a national identity centered on the Pashto language, tribal networks, and cultural practices. State institutions, including the military, civil administration, and education system, largely reflected historical settlement patterns and social networks, resulting in comparative underrepresentation of communities such as Tajiks, Hazaras, and Uzbeks. Scholars sometimes describe these policies as a form of "Pashtunization", as state-building efforts emphasized Pashto language and cultural norms as instruments of national integration. At the same time, the monarchy sought to unify the diverse population under a shared state framework while allowing regional elites to retain local influence, balancing centralization with local autonomy.

=== The role of foreign intervention in ethnic division and war (1978–1992) ===
The Saur Revolution of 1978 brought the People's Democratic Party of Afghanistan (PDPA) to power, initiating efforts to de-ethnicize politics through modernization, secularization, and a class-based revolutionary ideology. However, the PDPA itself was internally divided along both ideological and ethnic lines. The Khalq faction, predominantly rural and Pashto-speaking, dominated the early revolutionary structures, while the Parcham faction, largely urban and Dari-speaking, promoted broader ethnic inclusion and urban representation.

The Soviet invasion of Afghanistan in 1979, aimed at stabilizing the PDPA regime, along with subsequent foreign involvement supporting the Mujahideen resistance, contributed to the rise of ethnically organized militias. External actors, including the Soviet Union, United States, Pakistan, and Iran, often engaged with factions along ethnolinguistic lines, providing assistance based on perceived communal affiliations. Within this context, groups such as Jamiat-e Islami (Tajik), Hezb-e Wahdat (Hazara), and Junbish-i Milli (Uzbek) mobilized fighters along ethnic lines to assert control over territory and local governance. While alliances and loyalties shifted over time, ethnic identity became a key instrument for mobilization and political legitimacy.

=== Ethnicity during the civil war and Taliban rule (1992–2001) ===
The collapse of the Najibullah government in 1992 ushered in a new phase of ethnicized power struggles. The rise of the Tajik-dominated Jamiat-e Islami in Kabul temporarily reversed Pashtun political dominance, while Hazara and Uzbek factions, through Hezb-e Wahdat and Junbish-i Milli, consolidated control over significant regions.

During this period, demographic claims became highly politicized. For example, following the Northern Alliance's ascendancy, the CIA World Factbook revised the estimated Pashtun population from approximately 50% in 1991 to 38% the next year, reflecting political negotiation rather than demographic reality. Similar contestations of ethnic statistics occurred repeatedly, showing how population data became a strategic instrument in disputes over representation, resources, and authority.

The Taliban, emerging in the mid-1990s, drew the majority of their support from southern and eastern Afghanistan, rooted in local social networks. While they recruited across ethnic lines, their political organization remained shaped by regional dynamics and social affiliations, reinforcing Pashtun dominance. Foreign actors like Pakistan and Iran continued to engage along ethnic and regional lines. These relationships influenced military and political structures without implying inherent dominance of any single group.

=== Political inclusion and ethnic balancing after the United States invasion (post-2001) ===
The 2001 U.S.-led invasion and the adoption of the 2004 Constitution established a political framework emphasizing ethnic inclusion without formal quotas. Government positions, parliamentary representation, and provincial appointments were informally distributed to reflect perceived demographic proportions, despite the absence of a nationwide census.

The lack of reliable demographic data made estimates of ethnic composition a frequent instrument of political negotiation. Afghan actors, both within the country and in exile, often presented divergent figures to justify claims over representation, language rights, or political authority, making such numbers highly contested and integral to broader struggles for legitimacy. For example, during the drafting of the constitution, representatives of the Northern Alliance and other interest groups disputed questions of representation, language, and distribution of authority, a situation exacerbated by the absence of reliable census data.

Simultaneously, the legacy of wartime ethnic networks persisted, with former commanders and militia leaders acting as regional power brokers, often integrated into security forces or provincial administrations. NATO-backed state-building initiatives frequently relied on these networks to stabilize governance, institutionalizing ethnic patronage and reinforcing pre-existing divisions. Regional powers also maintained influence through alliances with ethnic leaders. Iran supported Hazara representatives, Uzbekistan backed Uzbek commanders, and Pakistan engaged with both Pashtun and, at times, Tajik-affiliated factions. These interactions embedded ethnic considerations deeply into the political and administrative landscape of Afghanistan.

After the re-establishment of the Islamic Emirate in 2021, observers debated whether the predominantly Pashtun leadership might influence demographic figures. However, there is no verifiable evidence of systematic manipulation. Available analyses tend to focus on the group's perceived dominance rather than altered statistics, leaving claims of "Pashtunization" under Taliban rule contested.

== See also ==
- Demographics of Afghanistan

== Sources ==
- Ruhland, Heike (2019). Peacebuilding in Pakistan: A Study on the Religious Minorities and Initiatives for Interfaith Harmony. Waxmann Verlag.
- Vinogradov, A.G.; Zharnikova, S.V. (2020). Indo-European Ornamental Complexes and their Analogies in the Cultures of Eurasia.
- West, Barbara A. (2010). Encyclopedia of the Peoples of Asia and Oceania. Infobase Publishing. p. 357. ISBN 9781438119137.
- Witzel, Michael (2004). "Kalash Religion (extract from 'The Ṛgvedic Religious System and its Central Asian and Hindukush Antecedents')" (PDF). In A. Griffiths; J. E. M. Houben (eds.). The Vedas: Texts, Language and Ritual. Groningen: Forsten. pp. 581–636. Archived (PDF) from the original on 28 September 2024.
