= Battle of Kafir Qala =

War fought between Iranians and Afghans

Date	June 1818
Location	Kafir Qala, Afghanistan
Result	Disputed, see Result

Belligerents
Durrani Empire	Qajar Iran

Commanders and leaders
Fateh Khan (WIA); Sher Dil Khan; Kohan Dil Khan; Sher Mohammad Hazara; Mohammad Khan Qaraei-Torbati	Hasan Ali Mirza; Mirza Abdul Wahhab Khan; Faiz Ali Khan

Casualties and losses
Unknown	10,000 Killed

The Battle of Kafir Qala (Persian: نبرد کافر قلعه, romanized: Nabard-e Kāfir Qal'ah) was fought in June 1818 between Iran and the Durrani Empire.

When Hasan Ali Mirza arrived in Mashhad and became governor of Khorasan he lunched a campaign into Afghanistan marched toward Herat, captured the Mahmudabad fort and occupied Jam, He then advanced on Herat, Firuz al-Din capitulated agreed to pay 50,000 tomans and acknowledged Fath-Ali Shahs authority in the Friday sermon but they were forced abandon Herat after the Afghans resisted the occupation of the city with an intense guerrilla war on the countryside. In 1818 the Iranian Shah, Fath-Ali Shah Qajar, sent his son Hasan Ali Mirza, with a huge Iranian army to recapture Herat. The Iranians marched from Khorasan and met the Afghan army shortly after crossing the border in the town of Kafir Qala.

== Battle ==
Although the exact numbers are debatable, all sources agree that the Durrani forces outnumbered the Qajars more than 2 to 1. The battle were set up as follows:

On Fateh Khan's right wing was Sherdil Khan with his Sistani, Firozkohi, and Jamshidi tribal forces. On the left side he placed Kohandil Khan with Herati, Taymani, and Darazi troops. The forces of Banyad Khan Hazara, chieftain of the Hazara tribesmen of Bakharz and Jam, were positioned on the right side with Sherdil Khan. Mohammad Khan Qara'i was positioned on the left side with Kohandil Khan.

On the Iranian side, Mirza ʿAbd al-Wahhab Khan “Mutamid al-Daula” and FayzʿAli Khan Qowanlu-ye Qajar formed the right side with their Khwajawand and 'Abd al-Maliki cavalry. In front of the right wing, Astarabadi infantry were placed with a single piece of artillery. The flank of the right wing included Husayn Qoli Khan Bayat Nishapuri with the infantry of Khorasan.

During the battle, Fateh Khan was shot in the mouth. This had a grave impact on the morale of the Afghan army, forcing them to retreat to Herat. The Qajars lost 10,000 men.

== Result ==
According to Christine Noelle Karimi, the result of the battle was inconclusive. Both armies fled from each other, and the Hazaras plundered the baggage of both. According to Percy Sykes the Afghans won by using strong and repeated cavalry charges, which broke the Persian infantry formations. As a result, the Persian army suffered 10,000 men and was forced to retreat, securing a clear Afghan victory. According to Historian Faiz Muhammad the Battle of Kafir Qal‘ah is described as an Afghan victory, although both sides eventually withdrew from the battlefield. Afghan forces dominated the fighting and inflicted heavy pressure on the Iranian army, but the battle ended without a decisive pursuit after confusion followed the wounding of Wazir Fath Khan. As a result, neither side fully exploited the outcome, and both armies later retreated.
