= Herati Civil War (1823–1829) =

| Date | 1823–1829 |
| Location | Emirate of Herat |
| Result | Loyalist victory |

Belligerents
| Loyalists; Herat; Principality of Kandahar; Qajar Iran | Opposition; Rival factions Aimaq tribesmen Uzbek tribesmen Hazara tribesmen | Rival factions Rebels; Herati Army defectors |

Commanders and leaders
| Kamran Mirza Durrani; Husain Khan; Mustafa Khan Zori (AWOL); Yar Mohammad Khan; Sher Dil Khan; Hasan Ali Mirza | Mahmud Shah Durrani # Saleh Khan (POW); Mustafa Khan Zori; Ata Mohammad Khan # Din Mohammad Khan; Yar Mohammad Khan | Firuz Mirza Durrani; Mustafa Khan Zori (executed) |

The Herati Civil War (Note: Pashto: د هرات کورنۍ جگړه, romanized: Də Harāt Koranəi Jagṛa [d̪ə (h)ä.ɾɑt̪/(h)i.ɾɑt̪ ko.ɾä.nəɪ d͡ʒäg.ɻä]; Persian: جنگ داخلی هرات, romanized: Jang-i Dākhilī-yi Harāt [d͡ʒäŋ.gɪ d̪ɑː.xɪ.líː.jɪ (h)ä.ɾɑ́ːt̪/(h)ɪ.ɾɑ́ːt̪]) was a dynastic conflict within the Emirate of Herat fought between Mahmud Shah Durrani and his son Kamran Mirza Durrani fought from 1823 to 1829.

== Background ==
Herat under Kamran Mirza Durrani has always refused to pay tribute, and actively supported internal revolts in Iran, specifically the revolt of Banyad Khan Hazara, the Hazara chieftain of Torbat-e Jam and Bakharz. On 25 June 1821, an Iranian force of 3,000 shattered Banyad Khan's troops, mainly consisting of Jamshidi, Firozkohi, Hazara Aimaq troops at the Battle of Kariz, and was pursued into their lands. Iranian forces invaded Herat less than a year later, and besieged the city, aiming to restore Mahmud Shah Durrani's uterine brother Firuz al-Din Mirza Durrani to the throne. In the process, Ibrahim Khan Jamshidi, Khalil Khan Taymani, and Qilij Khan Timuri who was the governor of Khaf, were all killed during a battle on 22 May 1822. Herat then withstood the siege by Iranian forces, despite the provine being ravaged dearly, but did not have an effect on Kamran, who aimed to attack Kandahar.

In 1823 or 1824, Kamran Mirza attempted to conquer Kandahar, and left the administration of Herat in the hands of Husain Khan and Mustafa Khan Zori. En route to Kandahar, Firuz al-Din Mirza was installed into the throne by his own allies. However, Mahmud Shah Durrani ended Firuz al-Din's 18-day rule, through his instigation that resulted in convincing the latter's allies to desert to himself. Firuz al-Din would then flee to Torshiz after being deposed, and would be assassinated at the instigation of Kamran Mirza 8 or 9 years later.

== Conflict ==
When Kamran Mirza Durrani returned from Kandahar, his father Mahmud Shah Durrani refused to let him back in. As a result, Kamran Mirza besieged Herat with support of the Principality of Kandahar. Mahmud Shah then recruited the help of Saleh Khan, who sent Mustafa Khan Zori to break the siege. Despite success, Mustafa Khan turned against his allies, imprisoned Saleh Khan, and forced Mahmud Shah out of the city. Mahmud Shah and Kamran Mirza then united against the rebellious instigator Mustafa Khan, and deposed him within a month, with Mahmud Shah executing him in the winter of 1824 through putting a paper hat on Mustafa Khan's head and pouring lamp oil on top of it.

After the death of Mustafa Khan, the two sides ended their temporary truce, and immediately started fighting each other for control. Mahmud Shah fled to Khwaja Abdullah Ansari's tomb at Gazurgah, and fled across the Murghab while occupying Bala Murghab lands 6 months later, to seek help from the Jamshidi tribe in the war. Kamran Mirza then requested the aid of Qajar Iran, to which Hasan Ali Mirza sent 6,000 or 10,000 men with 4 guns to his aid, reaching Herat on 16 July 1826. They then combined 2,000 of Kamran's Herati troops and marched towards the Murghab, but these plans were leaked by Mahmud's spies, who set up an ambush. The Aimaqs and Uzbeks then routed the Iranians, and refused to storm the citadel, despite marching onward to Herat, but camped outside instead, leading to a failure and the dissipation of the victory at Badghis.

Mahmud Shah fled to the Hazaras of Qala e Naw, but Kamran sent an army after him. The Herati army starved the Hazaras of supplies, and forced them to hand over Mahmud. However, he fled to Lash-Juwayn, rather than being taken prisoner. In 1827, Kamran Mirza took a pity on his father, and invited him back to Herat. In 1828 or 1829, Ata Mohammad Khan died, and was succeeded as vizier by his son Din Mohammad Khan, who later gave up the viziership to his 40-year old cousin Yar Mohammad Khan, due to courtiers being against the former appointment. Yar Mohammad Khan would later depose Mahmud Shah, who died shortly after, leading to the restoration of Kamran Mirza.
