= Timuri =

Timuri تیموری
Total population
- 350,000

Regions with significant populations
- Afghanistan: 145,000
- Iran: 196,000

Languages
- Persian dialects

Religion
- Islam (Sunni, Shia)

Related ethnic groups
- Hazaras, Iranian peoples

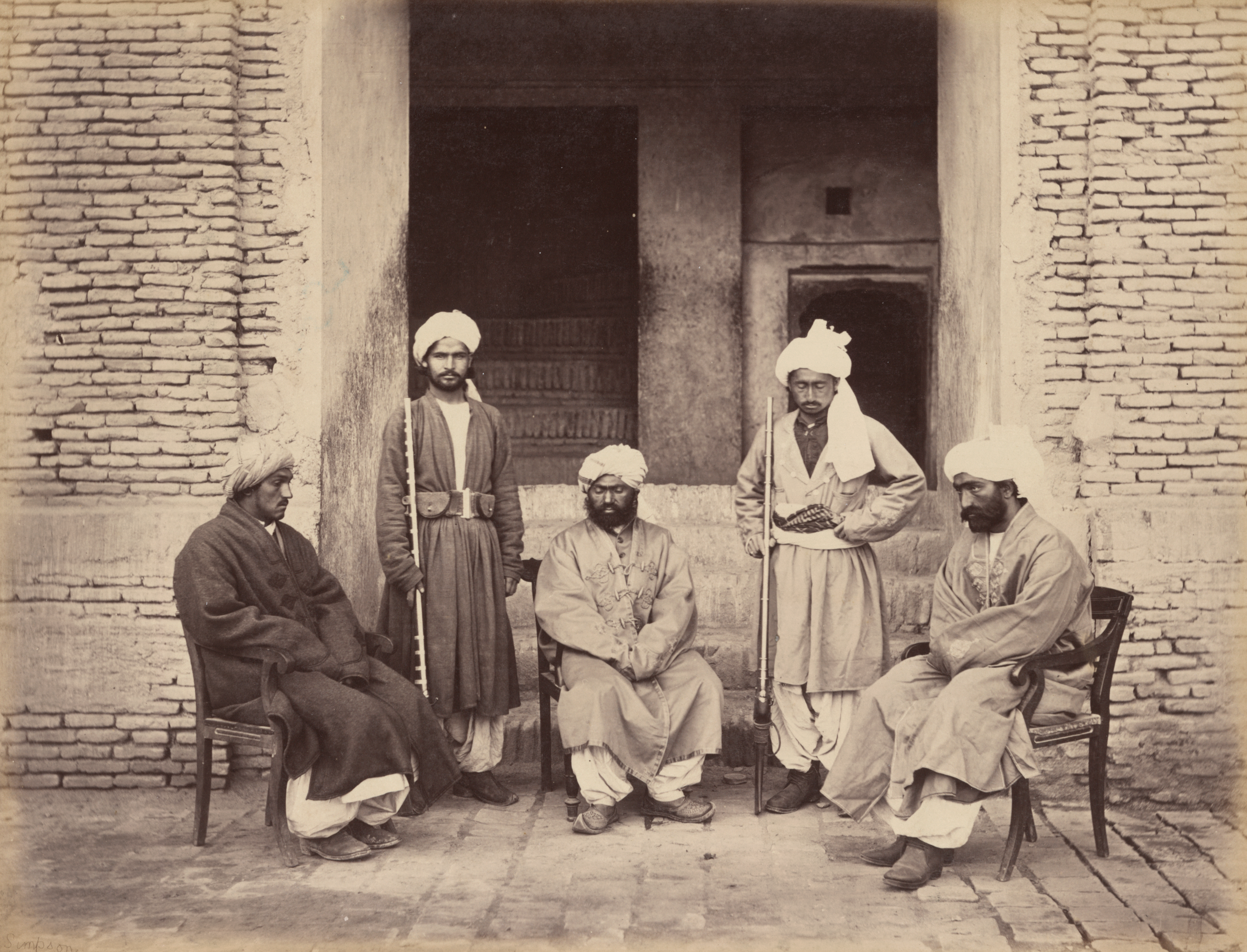

The Timuri or Taimuri (Persian: تیموری) are a sub-tribe of the Aimaq people of Afghanistan and Iran, which also include Jamshidi, Aimaq Hazara, Firozkohi, and Taymani. The Timuri originated in western Badghis Province. They mostly speak the Persian dialects.

The Timuri were once the largest and most powerful of the Aimaqs. They are believed to be descendants of Timur. Nowadays, they live in Afghanistan and Iran. In Iran, they live in the former Khorasan Province and around Mashhad. In Afghanistan, their traditional nomadic homeland is Badghis Province, while others are settled in oases near Herat and Shindand in western Afghanistan and near Ghazni in central Afghanistan. There is also a small group of Pashtunised pastoralist Timuri in Baghlan Province in northeastern Afghanistan.

Johnathan Lee notes that in 19th century accords, the Taimuri were often confused with the Taimani, but as the Taimuri were generally a small tribe living in Persian territory, it is usually the Taimani that chroniclers intended to note.

== See also ==
- Aimaq people
- Hazaras
- Timurid dynasty
