= Genetic studies of ethnic groups in Afghanistan =

DNA study results of the ethnic groups of Afghanistan refers to a body of population genetic research that uses DNA data to investigate the genetic origins, historical connections, and levels of admixture among the various ethnic groups residing in Afghanistan. These studies are typically based on genetic markers such as the Y chromosome, mitochondrial DNA (mtDNA), and autosomal genome-wide data.

Afghanistan is home to numerous ethnic groups with diverse ancestral backgrounds, including Iranian, South Asian (Indic), Turkic, Mongolic, Arab, and others, all of whom share intertwined history and culture.

== Background ==
Due to its geographical position at the crossroads of Central Asia, South Asia, the Iranian Plateau, and the Turkic–Mongolic world, Afghanistan has historically been a region of migration, settlement, and interaction among diverse populations. This long history of demographic movements and cultural exchange has resulted in a highly diverse and admixed genetic structure among Afghanistan's present-day populations.

Important note: The figures presented below represent average estimates derived from autosomal DNA studies in academic population genetics research. These percentages may vary depending on region, sampling strategy, and methodological approach. They reflect inferred ancestral genetic components rather than definitive or exclusive definitions of ethnic or cultural identity.

== Results ==
Approximate genetic composition of ethnic groups (percentage estimates)
Ethnic group	Iranian	Turkic	Mongolic	South Asian (Indic)	Arab	Total	Interpretation
Pashtuns	63%	2%	10%	19%	6%	100%	Iranian-related
Tajiks	76%	2%	13%	8%	1%	100%	Iranian-related
Hazaras	31%	34%	32%	1%	2%	100%	Turkic-related
Uzbeks	15%	65%	20%	0%	0%	100%	Turkic-related
Turkmen	10%	75%	15%	0%	0%	100%	Turkic-related
Aimaq	35%	28%	32%	5%	0%	100%	Iranian-related
Baloch	60%	0%	5%	30%	5%	100%	Iranian-related
Nuristanis	75%	3%	2%	20%	0%	100%	Iranian-related
Pashayi	49%	8%	8%	35%	0%	100%	Iranian-related
Qizilbash	25%	55%	7%	0%	13%	100%	Turkic-related
Mongols in Afghanistan	10%	15%	75%	0%	0%	100%	Mongolic-related
Hindus	14%	6%	5%	67%	8%	100%	South Asian (Indic)-related

== See also ==
- Ethnic groups in Afghanistan
- History of Afghanistan
- Population genetics
