= Kipchak (Aimaq tribe) =

Aimaq tribe of Kazakh origin in Herat Province, Afghanistan

Aimaq Kipchaks (Persian: قپچاق) are a group Taymani Aimaqs in Afghanistan who are of Kazakh origin.

== Distribution ==
They can be found in Obi district to the east of western Afghanistan's province of Herat, between the rivers Farāh Rud and Hari Rud.

== See also ==
- Taymani
- Kipchaks
