= Pashtunization =

Cultural or linguistic change towards Pashtun

Pashtunization (Pashto: پښتون‌ جوړونه), is a process of cultural or linguistic change in which someone or something non-Pashtun becomes acculturated or assimilated to Pashtun influence. Pashtuns are the largest ethnic group in Afghanistan and second-largest in Pakistan.

== History ==
Pashtunization has historically taken place whenever non-Pashtuns have settled in Pashtun-dominated areas, leading to them adopting the Pashtun culture and language over generations.

There are also many cases of Pashtun tribes migrating and settling in large numbers in non-Pashtun lands, resulting in the erosion of the local customs, traditions, and languages of the non-Pashtun peoples due to the political power and regional influence of the Pashtuns.

=== Pashtunization of the Khalaj Turks ===
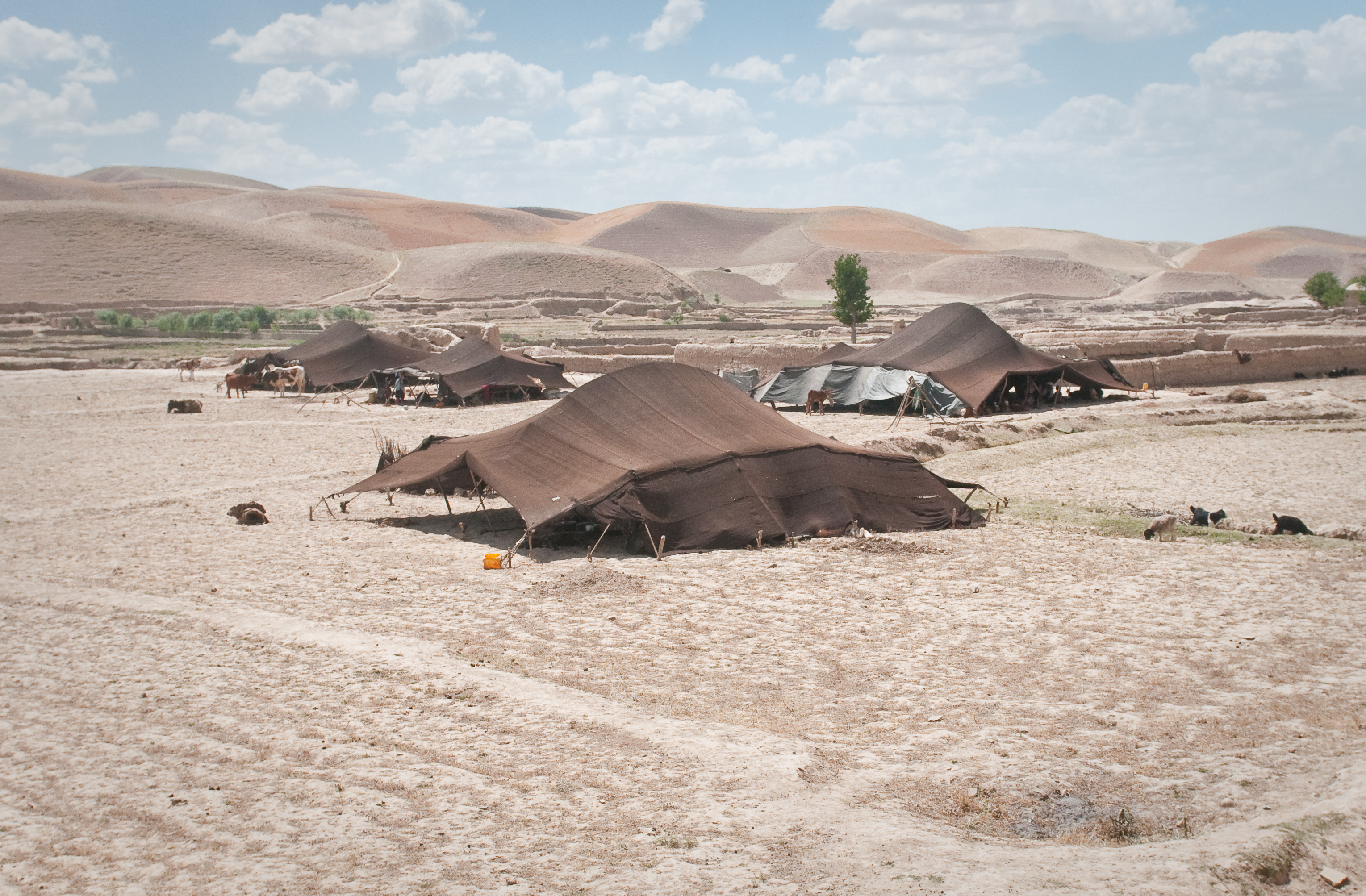
Tents of nomads in Badghis Province, Afghanistan. Known in Pashto as Kōchyān, they are mostly from the Ghilji tribe and migrate seasonally. Farming villages came into existence in Afghanistan about 7,000 years ago.

The Khalaj people underwent a form of cultural assimilation as a result of living in the Pashtun-populated regions of Afghanistan and Pakistan for several centuries.

"In the eighth and ninth centuries, ancestors of many of today's Turkic-speaking Afghans settled in the Hindu Kush area (partly to obtain better grazing land) and began to assimilate much of the culture and language of the Pashtun tribes already present there."

— Craig Baxter, Library of Congress Country Studies

The Khalaj were originally a Turkic tribe which had long domiciled in the Ghazni, Qalati Ghilji (also known as Qalati Khalji), and Zabulistan regions of present-day Afghanistan. They intermarried with the local Pashtuns and gradually adopted the Pashtun culture. Najib Bakran's geography, Jahān Nāma (c. 1200–1220), described the Khalaj as a "tribe of Turks" that had been going through a language shift. During the Mongol invasion of Central Asia, many found refuge in the Subcontinent, where they established the Khalji dynasty. Because they had already been Pashtunized by then, the Khalji were often seen as Pashtuns by the Turkic nobles of the Delhi Sultanate.

The Ghiljis are one of the largest Pashtun tribes. According to historian C.E. Bosworth, the tribal name "Ghilji" is derived from the name of the Khalaj, and it is likely that the Khalaj Turks initially formed the core of the tribe.

=== Pashtunization of Khyber Pakhtunkhwa ===
Pashtuns migrated into and settled in the region of modern Khyber Pakhtunkhwa for centuries, resulting in the Pashtunization of local Indo-Aryan tribes. By the 15th century, the Pashtuns were prominent political players in the region, establishing the Lodi dynasty of the Delhi Sultanate. Several Yusufzai tribesmen also began moving into the Peshawar Valley, displacing other Indo-Aryan and Pashtun tribes. In the 16th century, further migrations occurred during the rule of the Sur dynasty. In the 18th century, this process was once again intensified due to the establishment of the Durrani Empire.

In the 20th century, as the British prepared to depart from India, tensions over the Durand Line resurfaced. The Pashtunistan Resolution was adopted by Pashtun tribesmen a few months before the Partition, demanding the British to offer independence to a newly formed Pashtunistan comprising all Pashtun territories in British India, rather than being forced to choose between Pakistan or India. The British rejected their demands, and the region was joined with Pakistan following the North-West Frontier Province referendum. Following the referendum, a 6-year rebellion would break out in Waziristan, supported by Afghanistan and India. Pashtun nationalists in neighboring Afghanistan began propagating the idea of "Loy Afghanistan" (Greater Afghanistan), which argued that the Pashtun-majority areas of Pakistan, especially Khyber Pakhtunkhwa, should be annexed by Afghanistan. This led to tense situations such as the failed Bajaur Campaign in 1960-1961. Most Pakistani Pashtuns tend to focus more on obtaining political autonomy rather than irredentist politics.

Between the Soviet invasion of Afghanistan in 1979 to the USA's withdrawal from the area in 2021, millions of Afghan refugees, many of whom were Pashtuns, found refuge in Khyber Pakhtunkhwa and other provinces of Pakistan. Popular support would diminish as Kalashnikov (gun) culture and ethno-nationalism took root in the refugee camps. Some refugees would maintain ties with the Afghan Taliban, which has links to the Pashtun nationalist Pakistani Taliban. Several million refugees have now been repatriated or deported back to Afghanistan.

Many former Pashayi speakers have adopted the ethnonym Safi and often refer to themselves by the mountain valleys in which they live, whereas many of the former Dardic speakers of Swat and Indus Kohistan now claim to be Pashtuns.

=== Pashtunization of Rohilkhand ===
In the 17th and 18th centuries, Pashtun tribesmen (collectively known as the Rohillas) settled in present-day Western Uttar Pradesh. These Rohillas gave their name to the Rohilkhand region. The Rohilla dynasty, which was a Pashtunized Jat dynasty, led the Rohillas and established the Kingdom of Rohilkhand, and later the Rampur State.

Following the Partition of India, some Rohillas would join other Muhajirs and migrate to Pakistan. However, a sizable Rohilla community still exists in India, especially in the cities of Rampur, Bareilly, and Shahjahanpur.

=== Pashtunization of Afghanistan ===
The Pashtun colonization of Northern Afghanistan started in the late 19th century. In 1880, when Abdur Rahman Khan came into power, the Pashtun population in the north was almost nonexistent, numbering around 2 to 4% of the population. The Amir encouraged Pashtuns to settle in the north, while Turco-Persians and Tajiks were brought in to the south. This was done to strengthen the Amir's rule in Afghan Turkestan, and to consolidate Afghanistan's northern borders with the Russian Empire. The British Empire supported the Amir's policies, hoping to reduce Russian influence in Afghanistan.

Following the Hazara uprisings, roughly 80,000 Hazaras would flee from Hazarajat to escape the Hazara genocide. The abandoned land was then redistributed to nearby non-Hazara loyalists, such as the Kochi Pashtuns.

Pashtunization attempts were continued by the Musahiban, leading to some success. In the central Ghor Province, some southern groups of Aimaqs adopted the Pashto language, with the Taymani and Firozkohi subtribes claiming Pashtun descent. In the eastern Laghman Province and Nangarhar Province, many Pashayi are now bilingual in Pashto. Following the Saur Revolution, the Khalqists attempted to undermine the status of Dari in a bid to make Pashto the lingua franca of Afghanistan and remove Dari as an official language.

Before the overthrow of Mohammad Najibullah in 1992, Pashto made up more than 50% of media in Afghanistan. A Soviet GRU dossier described Najibullah as: "a Pashtun nationalist, he is one of the motivating spirits of the policy of “Pashtunization” of Afghan society. Within his closest circle he speaks only in Pashto. He is inclined to select colleagues not for their professional qualities but for their personal devotion to him, predominantly relatives and fellow-villagers".

Richard Strand argues that Pashtunization continues to occur due to intermarriages between Pashtun women and native Dardic Indo-Aryan and Nuristani men. He argues that the Pashtun wives rarely learn their husbands' language due to the "chauvinistic" attitude of Pashto speakers, leading to the children speaking Pashto as their primary language.

== See also ==
- Afghan (ethnonym)
- Pashtun people
- Pashtunistan
- History of Afghanistan
- List of Pashtun dynasties
- Pashtun nationalism
- Ashrafization (in India)
