= Aimaq =

Aimaq may refer to:

- Aimaq people, a collection of nomadic and semi-nomadic tribes in central and western Afghanistan
- Aimaq dialect, a dialect of the Persian language

== See also ==
- Aimag, an administrative subdivision of Mongolia, Russia and China
