= Afghan Qizilbash =

Shia Muslim ethnic group in Afghanistan

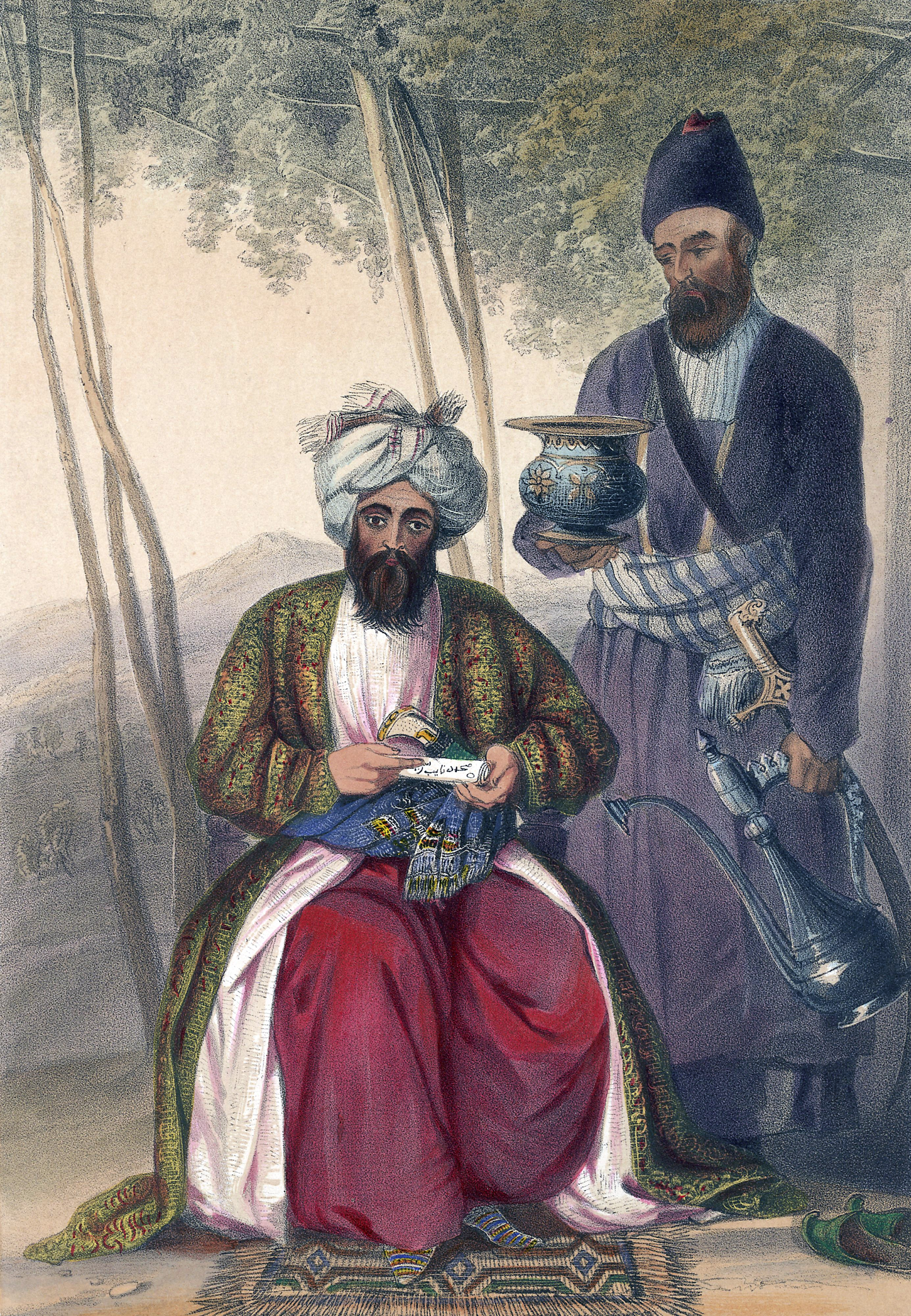
- Depiction of the Afghan Qizilbash leader Mohammad Naib Sharif and his secretary by James Rattray, dated 1848

Regions with significant populations
- Afghanistan: 30,000

Languages
- Dari Persian

Religion
- Twelver Shia Islam

The Afghan Qizilbash (Dari: قزلباش‌های افغان) are a Persian-speaking ethnic group in Afghanistan, mainly residing in Herat, Kabul and Kandahar. Numbering around 30,000, they are adherents of Twelver Shia Islam.

The Qizilbash were originally Turkoman tribesmen who supported the Safavid dynasty in Iran. Many Qizilbash were stationed in present-day Afghanistan during the reign of the Iranian shah (king) Nader Shah in 1738–1739, when garrisons were established in Kabul and Kandahar. After the assassination of Nader Shah in 1747, the Durrani king Ahmad Shah integrated the Qizilbash into his forces and administration. He granted them land, self-governance, and religious autonomy, enabling them to maintain their Shia faith while supporting his rule. The Qizilbash formed part of the bodyguard regiment ghulam khana, recruited to balance the power of Durrani and Ghilzai tribal leaders. The Qizilbash have historically presented themselves as Sunni or Pashtun to avoid religious discrimination and participate fully in Afghan government and society.

== History ==
=== Background ===
Scholarship has traditionally overlooked the numerous Shia Muslim minority communities in Afghanistan. Minimal research has been done on the Qizilbash and Farsiwan, while a few publications has been made about the Ismailis and Hazaras.

The name "Qizilbash" (meaning "red head") was first used in the late 15th-century to describe the red cap worn by Turkoman tribesmen who backed Shaykh Haydar (d. 1488), the father of Ismail I (r. 1501–1524), the founder of the Safavid dynasty of Iran. The Qizilbash held a prominent position as provincial governors and administrators under the Safavids. During this time, some Qizilbash migrated to Herat and Kandahar since present-day western Afghanistan was a part of Safavid Iran. It is generally accepted that the garrisons established by the Iranian shah (king) Nader Shah (r. 1736–1747) in Kandahar and Kabul during his 1738–1739 Indian invasion was when the Qizilbash became a large community in Afghanistan. 12,000 families were reported to have made up the garrison in Kabul. Referred to as "Khorasani" or "Persian", the Qizilbash was the biggest group from Iran to live near Kabul, with the Javanshir tribe forming the biggest part of their group.

=== In the Durrani Empire ===
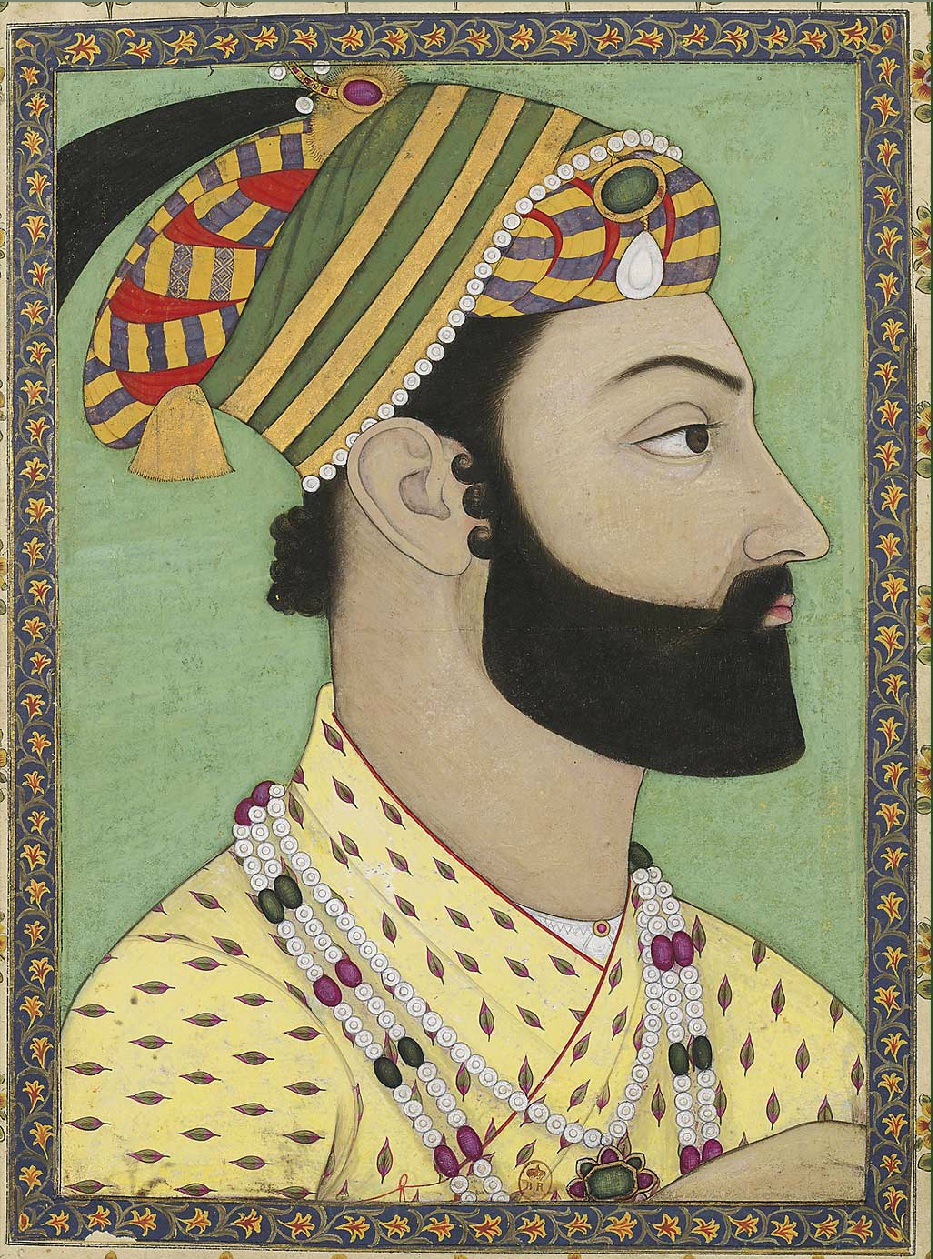
Portrait of Ahmad Shah Durrani, Bibliothèque nationale de France (c. 1757)

Nader Shah was murdered by mutinous officers on 21 June 1747. His death led to a power vacuum, which resulted in his vast empire being divided by various sovereigns. Ahmad Khan, the leader of the Afghan Abdali tribe and formerly part of the Afghan cadre of Nader Shah's army, fled to the city of Naderabad in Kandahar. There he assumed the title of Durr-i Durran ("Pearl of Pearls") and thus changed the name of his Abdali tribe to "Durrani." Ahmad Khan (now titled Ahmad Shah) then went on to conquer what had originally served as the frontier region between Safavid Iran and the Mughal Empire.

The majority of Afghan historians disagree with the importance that Nader Shah had in establishing the Afghan Qizilbash, considering the Durrani kings to have played a bigger role. Aziz al-Din Fofalzai notes that in 1740, Nader Shah left only one army unit in Kabul and one in Kandahar after withdrawing the majority of his forces to western Afghanistan. He also questions whether any lasting settlements in Kabul were established by Nader Shah. He believes that in 1748 and 1755, Ahmad Shah imported large groups of "new and old Khorasanis" to Kabul and granted them property in the city's environs based on their tribal affiliations.

In Autumn 1747, Ahmad Shah began a campaign against the Mughals, seizing Ghazni, before advancing on Kabul. Mohammad Taqi Khan Shirazi, a former officer of Nader Shah, joined Ahmad Shah and gained the support of the Qizilbash garrison in the Bala Hissar. The Qizilbash opened the gates of Kabul to Ahmad Shah as a result when he arrived at the city. The two sides exchanged many terms, with Ahmad Shah granting the Qizilbash a share in loot gained from war, self-governance, and protection to practice their Shia faith. The Qizilbash were further given districts in Chindawol and Murad Khani to have under Afghan suzerainty. Since the majority of Durrani leaders were unable to read and write, the Qizilbash controlled the civil service nearly entirely.

Under Ahmad Shah's successor Timur Shah Durrani (r. 1772–1793), more of the Qizilbash (as well as the Iranian Kurdish Rikas) were settled in Kabul. According to Husaini, a historian of Zaman Shah Durrani (r. 1793–1801), the Qizilbash were imported from Iran by Ahmad Shah so that they could serve in his personal bodyguard regiment, known as the ghulam khana. Ahmad Shah did this to keep the power of the Durrani and Ghilzai confederacy leaders in check, as they primarily constituted the core of his strength. The ghulam khana, made up primarily of Qizilbash but also included Tajiks, Hazaras, Firozkohis, Jamshidis, Taymanis, Kalmyks, and Habashis, was composed of cavalry and artillery.

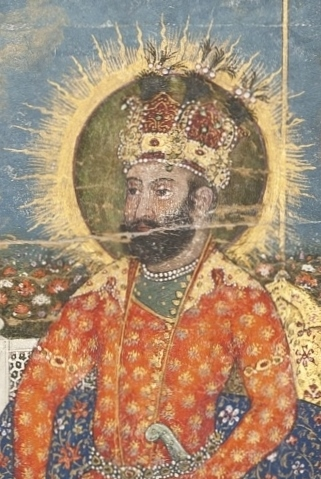
Illustration of Zaman Shah Durrani, dated 1793

The exact proportion of Qizilbash in the ghulam khana is to some extent disputed. The Indian historian Ganda Singh claimed that during Ahmad Shah's reign, one-third of the regiment was composed of Qizilbash. The Qizilbash played a crucial role in Timur Shah's local expeditions as mercenaries and bureaucrats. To counterbalance the Durrani cavalry, the ghulam khana was increased to 12,000 troops under his reign. Husaini reported that out of Zaman Shah's cavalry of 100,000, 15,000 belonged to the ghulam khana. The Scottish explorer and military officer Alexander Burnes observed that the Qizilbash were largely autonomous, only swearing directly allegiance to their individual leaders, who was subject to the Durrani king. According to the Iranologist Christine Noelle, "This statement is borne out by the fact that the command of the entire bodyguard rested with the Qizilbash leader Mahmud Khan Bayat during Timur Shah's time."

The Khorasani contingents were organized by tribal allegiance prior to Zaman Shah's reign. The Qizilbash leaders Ja'far Khan Jawansher and Khan Shirin Khan were in charge of the elite royal guard of kashikchis. However, Zaman Shah also gave non-Qizilbash figures like his Pashtun father-in-law Nur Muhammad Babar Amin al-Mulk and the treasurer Iltifat Khan command of several ghulam khana contingents. Possibly in response to an attempt by the Durrani rulers to challenge the independent structure of the Qizilbash cavalry, Ja'far Khan sent a petition to Zaman Shah just before the latters coronation, insisting on the need to preserve tribal distinctions within the army.

Similar concerns about Zaman Shah's intended consolidation of government agencies may have led Ja'far Khan and Arsalan Khan to join Payinda Khan and Muhammad Azim Khan Alakozai's conspiracy to overthrow Zaman Shah in the winter of 1799/1800. This conspiracy was also supported by Nur Muhammad Khan Baburi and several Durrani and Ghilzai leaders. They planned to assassinate Zaman Shah and his vizier Wafadar Khan, and install Zaman Shah's younger full-brother Shuja al-Mulk on the throne. Wafadar Khan eventually discovered the plans of the conspirators, who were beheaded and publicly displayed in Kandahar.

Payinda Khan's sons (including his eldest, Fateh Khan Barakzai) fled to Iran, where they swore allegiance to Zaman Shah's brother Mahmud Mirza. Due to the execution of Ja'far Khan and Arsalan Khan, the Qizilbash of Kabul and Kandahar also declared their allegiance to Mahmud Mirza. Mahmud Mirza (now known as Shah Mahmud) eventually emerged victorious in 1801, becoming the new Durrani ruler largely due to support by the Qizilbash, who now viewed themselves as kingmakers. Marriage links with the descendants of Hajji Jamal Khan Barakzai also contributed to the Qizilbash's increased dominance. Musa Khan Jawansher's daughter was also the wife of Payinda Khan, with whom she had Dost Muhammad Khan, who would later become the ruler of the Emirate of Afghanistan (1823–1926). Two of Payinda Khan's sons, as well as several of his grandsons, also had a Qizilbash wife.

In the early 1800s, the Qizilbash were almost fully independent, but their participation in the succession conflict intensified racial and religious xenophobia. They were never recognized as native to the nation by the Durrani council, who referred to them as "Persians". It was claimed by the enemies of Fateh Khan and the Qizilbash that, in the event of an attack by the shah of Iran on Herat and Kandahar, the Qizilbash would be support the invasion.

=== In the Emirate of Afghanistan ===
Discrimination against Shias intensified throughout the rule of Abdur Rahman Khan (r. 1880–1901) over Afghanistan. Because he thought the Twelvers were in league with Iran, Abdur Rahman Khan defended his actions against them. He used a variety of tactics to suppress the Twelvers. He first forced a large number of Twelvers to convert to Sunni Islam. If a person from the Qizilbash refused to convert, they had to pay a poll tax or wear a black turban with red marks on them. Later, Abdur Rahman Khan planned to deport the Qizilbash to Iran and India. This was never carried out, since Abdur Rahman Khan needed Qizilbash help to fight the Ghilzais, in 1886. Abdur Rahman Khan, however, dealt aggressively with the Hazaras and the Qizilbash after the Hazara rebelled. Blame for the start of the Hazara rebellion fell on the clerics in the Iranian city of Mashhad and Qizilbash, who were accused of telling Shia Muslims to disregard the authority of Sunni rulers. Abdur Rahman Khan used the Hazara rebellion as a justification to persecute the Hazaras and Shia Muslims. A number of Shia Muslims received sentences of stoning, with some even burned alive. The majority of Qizilbash in the army and administration lost their jobs, and many, particularly those from western Afghanistan, departed for Iran.

During the Third Anglo-Afghan War in the reign of Amanullah Khan, one of Amanullah's generals, 'Abd al-Quddus Khan, intended to advance into Balochistan. A religious revolt however, tied his forces down in Kandahar and after finally taming the revolt with the aid of Ali Ahmad Khan, the Qizilbash in the city were massacred.

=== In present-day Afghanistan ===
Like other adherents of Twelver Shia Islam, the Qizilbash in private followed their Shia faith while in public they presented themselves as Sunnis or Pashtuns in order to participate in government and society. Reliable census data is problematic to obtain since the Qizilbash still engage in taqiyya, the practice of hiding their true beliefs or having a dual religious identity, to avoid religious and political persecution. They seem to live mostly in cities and are typically lawyers, doctors, engineers, and teachers. They are thought to number around 30,000 and are primarily found in Herat, Kabul, and Kandahar. They are Persian-speakers and no longer speak their native Turkic language.

=== Notable people ===
- Ehsan Bayat, Afghan American business entrepreneur.

== Sources ==
- Axworthy, Michael (2006). The Sword of Persia: Nader Shah, from Tribal Warrior to Conquering Tyrant. I.B.Tauris. ISBN 978-1850437062.
- Dupree, Louis (1979). "Further Notes on Taqiyya: Afghanistan". Journal of the American Oriental Society. 99 (4): 680–682. doi:10.2307/601454. JSTOR 601454. (registration required)
- Green, Nile (2017). Afghanistan's Islam: From Conversion to the Taliban. University Press of California Press. ISBN 978-0520294134.
- Johnson, Thomas H.; Adamec, Ludwig W. (2021). Historical Dictionary of Afghanistan. Rowman & Littlefield. ISBN 978-1538149287.
- Lee, Jonathan L. (2019-01-15). Afghanistan: A History from 1260 to the Present. Reaktion Books. ISBN 978-1-78914-010-1.
- Kramer, Martin (2019) [1987]. Shi'ism, Resistance, And Revolution. Routledge. ISBN 978-0367287245.
- Nejatie, Sajjad (2017). "Iranian Migrations in the Durrani Empire". Comparative Studies of South Asia, Africa and the Middle East. 37. Project Muse: 494–509. doi:10.1215/1089201x-4279212. S2CID 148940975.
- Noelle, Christine (1997). State and Tribe in Nineteenth-century Afghanistan: The Reign of Amir Dost Muhammad Khan (1826–1863) (illustrated ed.). Routledge. ISBN 0-7007-0629-1.
- Rubin, Barnett R. (2002). The Fragmentation of Afghanistan: State Formation and Collapse in the International System. Yale University Press. ISBN 978-0300095197.
- Tucker, Ernest S. (2006). Nadir Shah's Quest for Legitimacy in Post-Safavid Iran. University Press of Florida. ISBN 978-0813029641.
