= Ansarlu =

Turks adherent of Twelver Shi'ism

The Ansarlu or Ansaroğlu are Turks adherent of Twelver Shī‘ism. This tribe belongs to a branch of Kangarlu, Afghan Qizilbash people. This tribe is also found in the Qala e Fatullah villages of Wazirabad in Kabul.

== Origin ==
In Afghanistan the clan is known to have who originally migrated into the country with Nader Shah Afshar. Takht e Nadir Shah Afshar, located in Wazirabad, was Nader Shah's base during his Indian campaign.

== See also ==
- Qizilbash
- Oghuz Turks
- Afshār
- Azerbaijani people
