= Khorasan province =

Former province of Iran

Khorasan Province استان خراسان Khurasan Khorassan
- Former province of Iran
- Location of Khorasan within Iran (pre-2004)
- Country: Iran
- Dissolved: September 2004

Area
  - Total: 299,231 km^{2} (115,534 sq mi)

Population (1996 census)
  - Total: 6,047,661
  - Density: 20.2107/km^{2} (52.3454/sq mi)
- Time zone: UTC+03:30 (IRST)
- Main language(s): Persian

Khorasan (Persian: استان خراسان [xoɾɒːˈsɒːn]; also transcribed as Khurasan, Xorasan and Khorassan), also called Traxiane during Hellenistic and Parthian times, was a province in northeastern Iran until September 2004, when it was divided into three new provinces: North Khorasan, South Khorasan, and Razavi Khorasan.

Khorasan historically referred to a much larger area, comprising the east and the northeast of the Persian Empire. The name Khorāsān is Persian and means "where the sun arrives from". The name was first given to the eastern province of Persia during the Sasanian Empire and was used from the Late Middle Ages in distinction to neighbouring Transoxiana.

This province, whose people are mainly Shia Muslims, roughly encompassed the western portion of the historical Khorasan. The modern boundaries of the Iranian province of Khorasan were formally defined in the late nineteenth century and the province was divided into three separate administrative divisions in 2004.

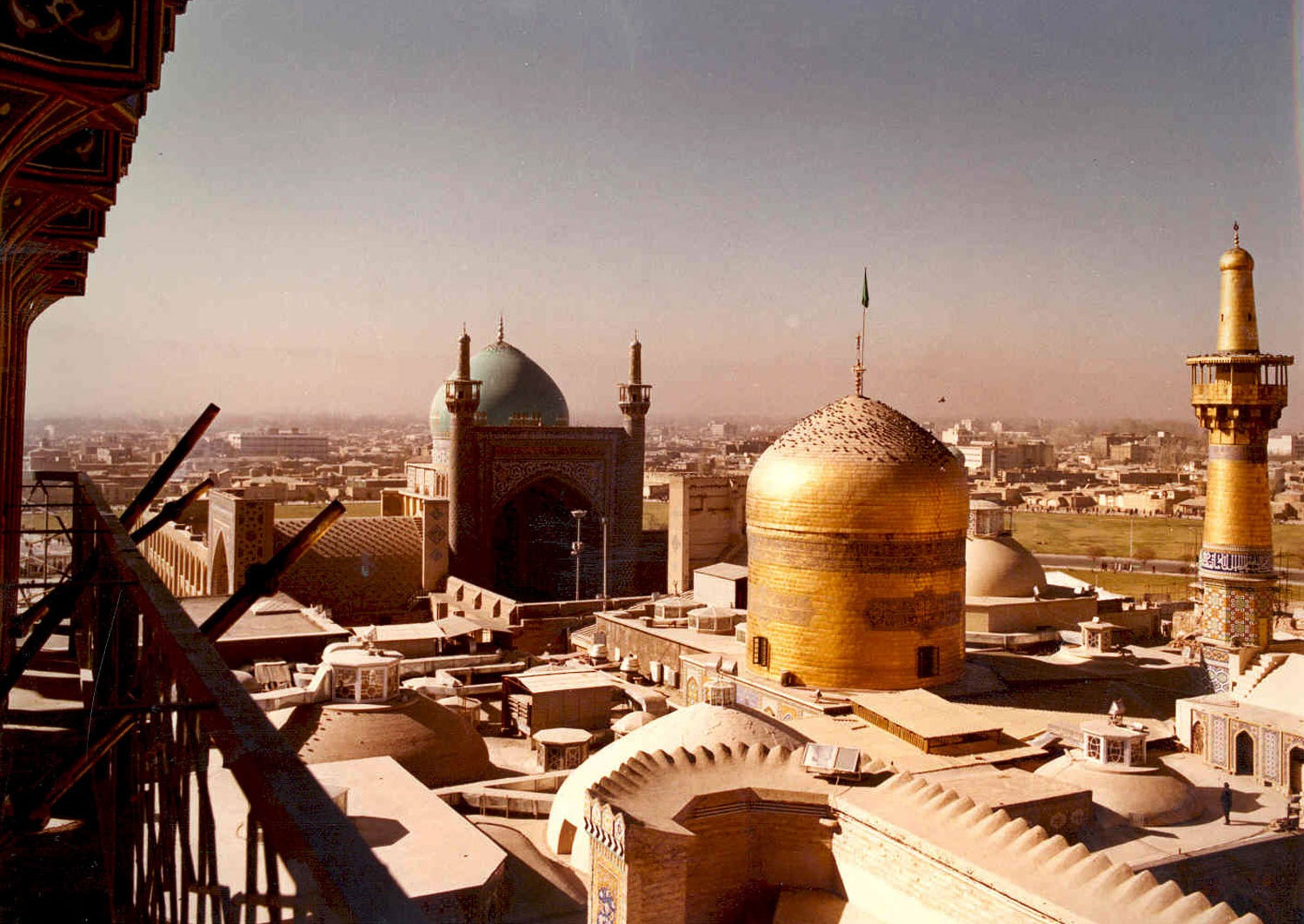
The domes of the Imam Reza Shrine and the Goharshad Mosque, 1976, at Mashhad, a major city in the former Khorasan and now the capital of the Razavi Khorasan province

== History ==
The name Khorāsān (lit. "sunrise"; "east"; or "land of the rising sun") was originally given to the eastern province of Persia during the Sassanian period. The old Iranian province of Khorasan roughly formed the western half of the historical Khorasan a region which included parts that are today in Iran, Afghanistan, Tajikistan, Turkmenistan and Uzbekistan. Some of the major historical cities of Persia are located in the greater Khorasan: Nishapur and Tus (now in Iran); Merv and Sanjan (both ruined, now in Turkmenistan); and Herat and Balkh (now in Afghanistan). The term was also used from the Late Middle Ages—especially in post-Mongol (Chagatai and Timurid) times—to distinguish the region from neighbouring Transoxiana, which includes Samarkand and Bukhara (now in Uzbekistan) as well as Khujand and Panjakent (now in Tajikistan). The modern Iranian boundaries of the province of Khorasan were defined and formalised in the late 19th century.

In August 1968 and September 1978, the region was the scene of two major earthquakes that left 12,000 and 25,000 people dead, respectively. A third major earthquake, the 1997 Qayen earthquake, took place on 10 May 1997 and left 1,567 dead, 2,300 injured, and 50,000 homeless.

== Modern divisions ==
Khorasan was the largest province of Iran until it was divided into three separate provinces in September 2004:

- North Khorasan, center: Bojnourd, other counties: Shirvan, Esfarayen, Garmeh and Jajarm, and Maneh and Samalgan
- South Khorasan, center: Birjand, other counties: Ferdows, Qaen, Nehbandan, Sarayan, Sarbisheh and Darmian.
- Razavi Khorasan, center: Mashhad, other counties: Sabzevar, Neyshabour, Torbat-e-Heydariyeh, Quchan, Torbat-e Jam, Kashmar, Taybad, Gonabad, Dargaz, Sarakhs, Chenaran, Fariman, Khaf, Roshtkhar, Bardaskan, Kalat and Khalilabad.

Some parts of the province were added to

- some southern parts to Sistan and Baluchestan province
- some western parts to Yazd province

== Demographics ==
The major ethnic groups in the region are Persians with Khorasani Kurds, Khorasani Turks and Turkmens as the main minorities. Smaller minorities are Khorasani Baloch, Jews, Timuri Aimaqs, Hazaras, and Roma. Most of the people in the region natively speak closely related modern day dialects of Persian. The region is home to a significant Sunni Muslim minority. The largest cluster of settlements and cultivation stretches around the city of Mashhad northwestward, containing the important towns of Quchan, Shirvan, and Bojnurd.

== See also ==
- Khwarezm
- Afsharid dynasty
- Delhi–Multan road to Mashhad, capital of Iranian Khorasan, providing access to capital city Ashgabat of Turkmenistan.
