= Jamshidi (Aimaq tribe) =

Subtribe of Chahar Aimaq in Afghanistan

Jamshidi جمشیدی
Languages
- Aimaq dialect of Persian

Religion
- Sunni Islam

The Jamshidi (Persian: جمشیدی) are a sub-tribe of the Chahar Aimaq ethnic group in Afghanistan, one of the four major Aimaq tribes, which also include the Aimaq Hazara, Firozkohi, and Taymani. The Jamshidi are a primarily sedentary people living in Herat and are believed to be one of the oldest Persian tribes. Some Jamshidis have settled in Turkmenistan.

== History ==
A 1926 publication notes that the Iranian city of Nishapur (in northeast Iran, near the Badghis Province of Afghanistan) has a population of "Jamshidis", originating from "north of Herat", who moved to the area following the 1856–1857 Anglo-Persian War. Jamshidi tribes are Sistani Persian nomads, who migrated to western Afghanistan over several centuries.

== See also ==
- Aimaq people
