= Aimaq Hazara =

Subtribe of Hazara origin in Afghanistan

Aimaq Hazara ایماق هزاره
Languages
- Aimaq dialect

Religion
- Sunni Islam

Related ethnic groups
- Other Hazaras, Aimaqs, Moghols

The Aimaq Hazara (Hazara-ye Qala-ye Naw; Dari: ایماق هزاره, romanized: Aimāq Həzārə) are one of the Chahar Aimaq tribes. They are mostly Sunni Muslims while other Hazaras are mostly Shia Muslims. Some Aimaq Hazaras are semi-nomadic and live in yurts covered with felt.

== See also ==
- List of Hazara tribes
