= Firozkohi =

Subtribe of Chahar Aimaq in Afghanistan

The Firozkohi (Pashto: فیروزکوهي) are a sub-tribe of the Chahar Aimaq in Afghanistan, and one of the four major Aimaq tribes, which also include the Jamshidi, Taymani, and Taimuri. The Firozkohi speak the Aimaq dialect of Dari Persian and Pashto. Their chiefs claimed an Achakzai Pashtun descent. They are named after Firozkoh, the medieval capital of the Ghurid dynasty.

The Firozkohi are semi-nomadic and inhabit the valleys of the Murghab River, largely in Badghis Province.

== Origin ==
The traditional chiefs of the northern Firozkohi tribe are known as Zay Ḥākem who claim descent from Achakzai Pashtuns, whereas the tribe takes its name from Firozkoh, the capital of the Ghurid dynasty.

== History ==
In 1987, the Firozkohi were the second-largest Aymaq tribe, after the Taymani.

== See also ==
- Hazaras
