= Taymani =

Kakar tribe of Ghor Province, Afghanistan

The Taymani (Pashto: تایمنی) are a sub-group of Chahar Aimaq in Ghor Province in central Afghanistan. They speak the Aimaq dialect of but some southern groups of Taymanis speak the Pashto language. The coalition was founded by a Kakar Pashtun chief known as Tayman.

== History ==
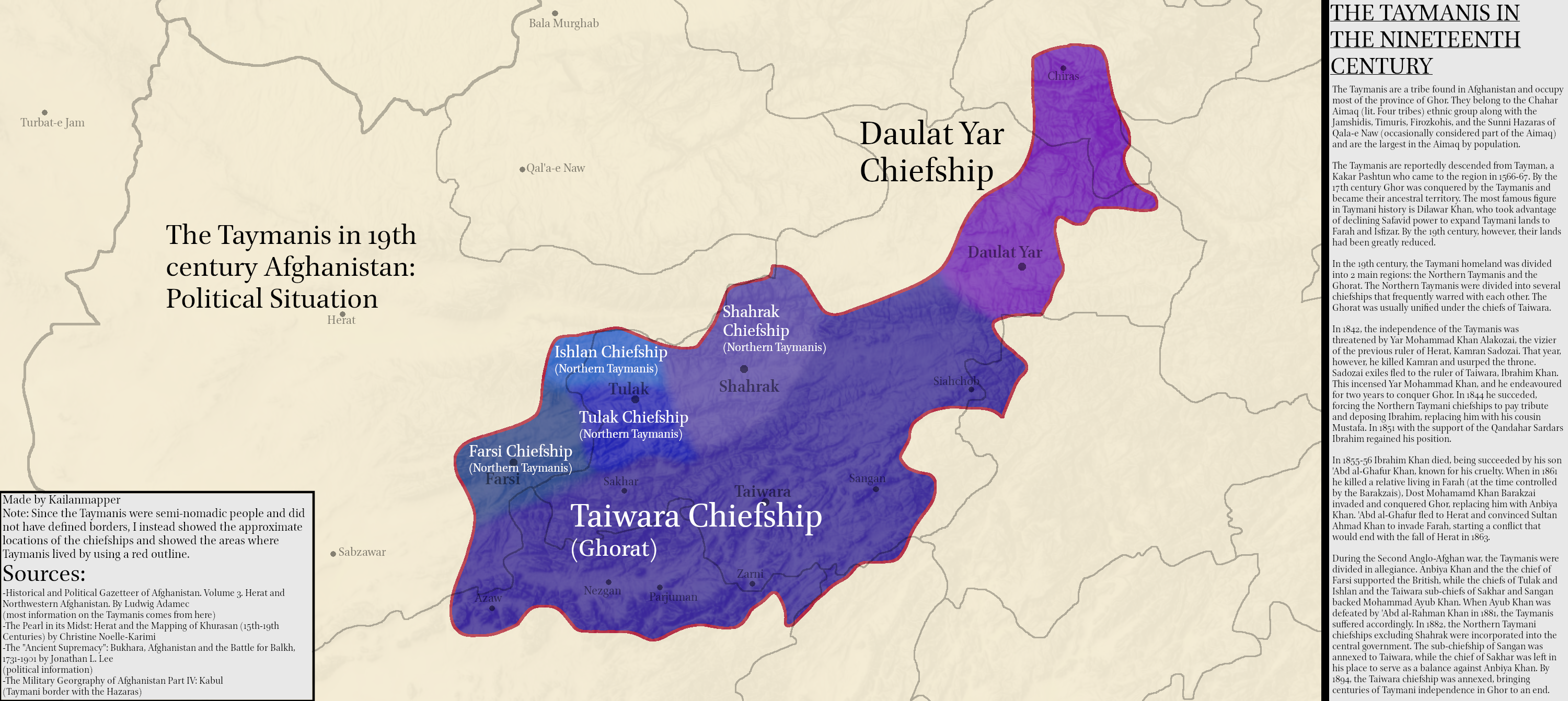
Map of the Taymanis in the 19th century

The Taymanis were established by Tayman, a Kakar Pashtun. The Taymanis would go onto conquering Ghor in the late 1600's. During the decline of the Safavids, the Taymanis conquered Farah and Shindand District under Dilawar Khan. The Taymanis would go onto siding with the Durrani Empire during their rise and gave troops to the Sadozais. The Taymanis began declining in the nineteenth century with the collapse of the Durranis. The Taymanis would see support from other states including the Emirate of Kandahar, while also being placed under threat from states such as the Emirate of Herat, and the Firozkohis. The Taymanis would swear fealty in the 1860s to the Emirate of Afghanistan which was ruled by Dost Mohammad Khan. The Taymanis would continue to fall into decline until finally being stripped of their privileges in 1894, ending Taymani rule in Ghor.
