= Aimaq dialect =

Persian dialect of the Aimaq people of northwest Afghanistan

Aimaq
- گویش ایماقی
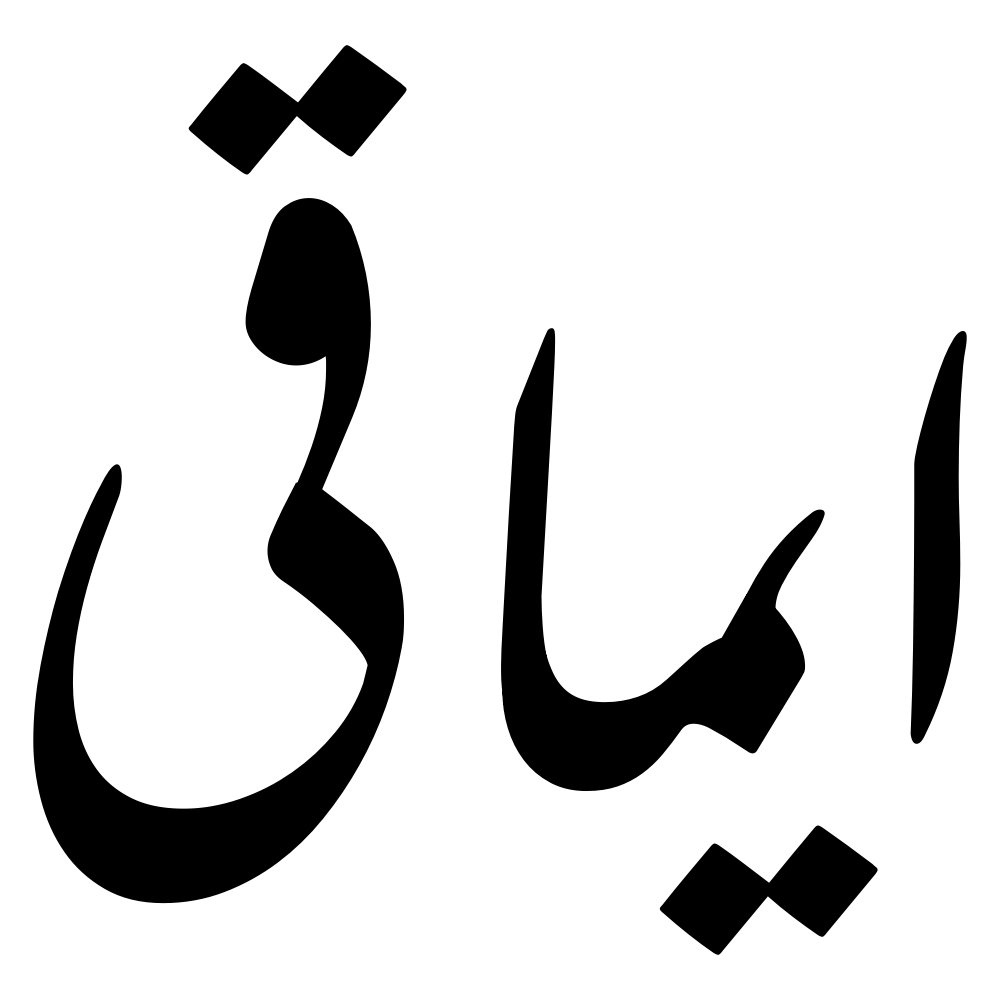
- Aimaqi written in the Persian script in Nastaliq style.
- Native to: Afghanistan
- Ethnicity: Aimaq
- Native speakers: 1.9 million (2017–2019)
- Language family: Indo-European: Indo-Iranian; Iranian; Western Iranian; Southwestern Iranian; Persian; Eastern; Aimaq
- Writing system: Persian alphabet

Official status
- Recognised minority language in: Tajikistan (in Gorno-Badakhshan)

Language codes
- ISO 639-3: aiq
- Glottolog: aima1241

Aimaq or Aimaqi (Persian: ایماقی, romanized: Aimāqi) is a Persian dialect and the dominant eastern Persian ethnolect spoken by the Aimaq people in central northwest Afghanistan (west of the Hazarajat). It is close to the Dari varieties of Persian. The Aimaq people are thought to have a 5–15% literacy rate.

== Dialects ==
Subdialects of the Aimaq dialect are as follows: Chinghizi, Firozkohi, Jamshidi, Maliki, Mizmast, Taimani, Taimuri, Zainal and Zohri.

== Phonology ==
Phonetically, as one of the eastern Persian dialects, the Aimaq dialect displays typical phonological features of eastern varieties of Persian.

=== Vowels ===
- The "majhul" vowels ē and ō are kept separate in Aimaq, whereas in western Persian they are merged with ī and ū respectively. For instance, the identically written words شیر 'lion' and 'milk' are in western Persian both pronounced [šīr], but in Aimaq [šēr] for 'lion' and [šīr] for 'milk'. The long vowel in زود 'quick' [zūd] and زور 'strong' [zūr] is realized as [ū] in western Persian, whereas these words are pronounced as [zūd] and [zōr] respectively by Aimaq speakers.
- The diphthongs of early Classical Persian aw (as ow in Engl. cow) and ay (as i in English ice) have in Aimaq become [ow] (as in Engl. low) and [ej] (as in Engl. day). Dari and Iranian Persian, on the other hand, are more archaic, e.g. نوروز 'Persian New Year' is realized as [nowrūz], and نخیر 'no' is uttered as [naχejr] in Dari and Iranian Persian, and as [naχajr] in Aimaq.
- /æ/ and /e/ are kept separate in word-final positions in Aimaq, whereas in western Persian, /æ/ has [e] as a word-final allophone.

=== Consonants ===
- Aimaq pronounces و as a bilabial consonant [w], which is realized as a voiced labiodental fricative [v] in western Persian. [v] is found in Aimaq as an allophone of f before voiced consonants.
- The voiceless uvular plosive /q/ (ق) and voiced velar fricative /ɣ/ (غ) are treated as separate phonemes in Aimaq whereas in western Persian they are merged as one.

== See also ==
- Hazaragi dialect
