= Aimaq people =

Ethnic group of Afghanistan

Aimaq ایماق
Total population
- 1,593,418 (2021); 4% of the population of Afghanistan (Note: The last census in Afghanistan was conducted in 1979, and was itself incomplete. Due to the ongoing conflict in the country, no official census has been conducted since.)

Languages
- Aimaq dialect of Persian

Religion
- Sunni Islam

Related ethnic groups
- Hazaras, Tajiks

The Aimaq (Dari: ایماق, romanized: Aimāq), (Note: Also transliterated as Aymaq, Aimagh, Aimak, and Aymak.) also known as the Chahar Aimaq, are a collection of Sunni and mostly Persian-speaking nomadic and semi-nomadic tribes. They live mainly in the central and western highlands of Afghanistan, especially in Ghor and Badghis. Aimaqs were originally known as chahar ("four") Aymaqs: Jamshidi, Aimaq Hazara, Firozkohi, and Taymani. The Timuri, which is a separate tribe but is sometimes included among Aimaqs, which is known as Aimaq-e dīgar ("Other Aimaq").

The Aimaq speak several subdialects of the Aimaq dialect of Persian language, but some southern groups of Taymani, Firozkohi, and northeastern Timuri Aimaqs have adopted the Pashto language.

CIA map showing the territory of the settlement of ethnic groups and subgroups in Afghanistan (2005)

== Etymology ==
The word "Aimaq" is derived from the Turkic-Mongolic word "Oymaq" that means "tribe" and "group of tribes".

== Origin ==
The Aimaqs claim different origins based on their tribal background. Some claim to be descended from the troops of Genghis Khan. The Taymani coalition was formed by a Kakar Pashtun while the chiefs of Firozkohi claimed descent from Achakzai Pashtuns.

== Culture and society ==
The Aimaq are largely nomadic to semi-nomadic goat and sheep herders. They also trade with villages and farmers during migrations for pastures for their livestock. The material culture and foodstuffs of the Aimaq include skins, carpets, milk, dairy products and more. They trade these products to settled peoples in return for vegetables, grains, fruits, nuts, and other types of foods and goods.

=== Religion ===
Aimaqs are largely Sunni Muslims except for the Jamshidi who are mainly Isma'ili Shia Muslims.

== Demographics ==
In 2021, the Aimaq made up 4% of Afghanistan's population.

== See also ==
- Hazaras
- Moghols
