= Shams-ul-Huda Shams =

- شمس الهدا شمس
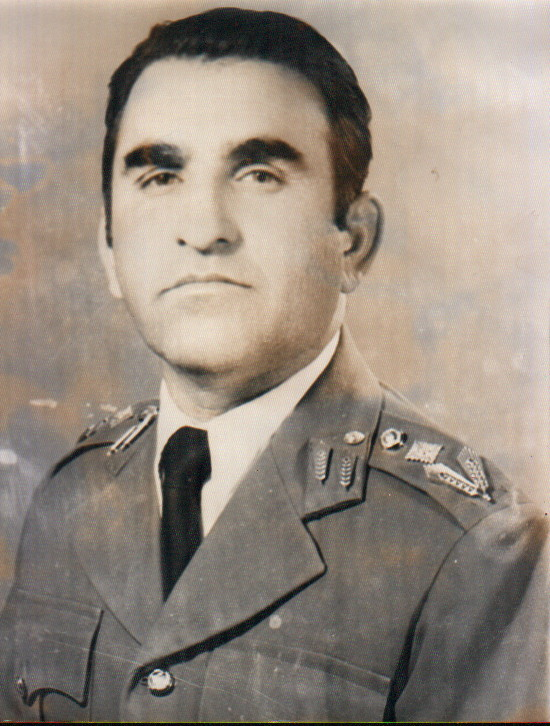

President of the Afghan Mellat Party (Shams Faction)
- In office 1987 – 9 October 2005
- Succeeded by: Ajmal Shams

Personal details
- Born: 1938 Nurgal, Kunar province, Kingdom of Afghanistan
- Died: 9 October 2005 (aged 66–67)
- Political party: Afghan Mellat Party

Military service
- Allegiance: Afghanistan

Shams-ul-Huda Shams (Pashto: شمس الهدا شمس; 1938 – 9 October 2005) was the president of the Afghan Millat Party (Afghan Social Democratic Party) from 1987 until his death on October 9, 2005. He was also a journalist, publishing articles in his party's newspaper called 'Afghan Millat'. Shams had recently returned to his homeland after twenty-seven years in exile and had opened an office for his party in Jalalabad.

== Early years ==
Shams, an ethnic Pashtun, was born in Nurgal in the Kunar province of Afghanistan. In 1984, the founder of Afghan Social Democratic Party, Ghulam Mohammad Farhad, died. Three years later in 1987, Shams was elected as the new head of the party.

== Afghan mellat ==
The party then began to split into 3 factions, one led by Shams-ul-Huda Shams, another by Qudratullah Hadad and the third by Mohammad Amin Wakman. Wakman's faction is now led by Afghan Finance Minister Anwar Ul Haq Ahady.

== Soviet-Afghan War ==
During the early days of the Soviet–Afghan War, Shams established a base for his party in Peshawar, Pakistan. He led his party in the face of strong opposition from religious extremist parties on one hand and the incumbent communist regime on the other. Shams had an uncompromising attitude towards communism, that is why he never agreed to strike a deal with the Soviet-backed government of Kabul in spite of repeated attempts by the latter, up to the point of offering him a cabinet position.

Shams was in favor of the establishment of a modern democratic government in the country which could retain its National Islamic character. After the removal of Mohammad Najibullah's Soviet-backed government and Mujahideen take over of Afghanistan, shams continued his opposition with the Islamist regime of Burhanuddin Rabbani, which he argued, was not representing the majority of Afghan nation. Shams was also opposed to the Taliban government that was backed by Pakistan.

While in Peshawar, Shams continued to publish his party's newspaper Afghan Mellat which published articles that produced nationalistic sentiments and called for democratic development in the war-ravaged Afghanistan. Besides writing in his party's journal, Shams also contributed scholarly articles and essays to other newspapers and journals. A unique feature in his writings was that he described facts regardless of its outcome.

Shams kept a close friendly relationship with Pakhtun Nationalist Parties and Pashto literary organizations of Pakistan, especially Pakhtunkhwa Qawmi Party of Afzal Khan Lala.

== Death ==
Shams died on October 9, 2005, his death was widely mourned by Afghans all over the world. After the death of Shamsul Huda Shams, the party congress held an emergency meeting and elected Ajmal Shams as the new president of the Afghan Mellat Party.

== See also ==
- Ghulam Mohammad Farhad
- Afghan Mellat
- Pashtun nationalism
- Pashtun question
