= Political violence in Afghanistan =

As a geographically fragmented state, Afghanistan is separated into as many as 14 ethnic groups that have historically faced divisions that devolved into political violence. This conflict reached its culminating point in the 1990s with the rise of the Taliban.

== Demographics ==
There are 14 nationally recognized ethnic groups in Afghanistan, including Tajiks, Pashtuns, Hazaras, Uzbeks, and others who make up less than 2% each. The most recent figures on the ethnic affiliations come from a survey conducted by the Asia Foundation in 2014. According to the representative survey, 43% of the population identifies as Pashtun, 27% as Tajik, 15% as Hazara, 8% as Uzbek, 2% as Turkmen, 2% as Aimaq, 1% as Baloch, 1% as Nuristani, and 1% as Pashayi.

== Geographic Separation ==
Afghanistan's ethnic groups are, for the most part, separated into 4 distinct zones of the country. These zones are referred to as Herat, Kabul, Mazar-i-Sharif, and Kandahar. The country's mountainous terrain, rivers, and lack of infrastructure limit communication and travel between these zones which reinforces existing divides between major ethnic groups.

== 1880-1901 ==
Abdul Rahman Khan was the Amir of Afghanistan between 1880 and 1901. During this time, the historic ethnic majority held by the Pashtuns fluctuated greatly. The number of Pashtuns decreased in 1893 after Rahman ceded Pashtun held areas to British India. However, the Pashtun population soon returned to higher numbers when the Emir resettled many of the group into the country's north.

In the 1880s and 1890s, Abdul Rahman Khan fought for the removal of Hazaras from the country, even going so far as to order their murders. During this time, the Hazaras were set apart from Afghanistan's other ethnic groups due to their status as Shia rather than Sunni Muslims. As a Sunni Muslim and a member of the Pashtun majority, Abdul Rahman Khan encouraged violence against the Hazaras.

This genocide of the Hazaras was also perpetrated by Pashtun religious leaders. Members of the Pashtun group were told that they would likely be rewarded by Allah if they participated in this violence towards the Hazaras.

During this period of conflict, around 60% of Afghanistan's Hazaras were killed and even more were forced to migrate into surrounding countries.

== 1901-1978 ==
During this time, the Pashtuns sought the creation of an independent Pashtunistan that was separate from Afghanistan. This hypothetical state was intended to exist along the Durand Line, the border between Pakistan and Afghanistan, and to unite Pashtuns living in both states. This issue and others saw political groups in Afghanistan increasingly forming along ethnic lines. For example, Pashtun nationalists banded together to form Afghan Millat, a political party that fought for the creation of Pashtunistan.

In 1973, Muhammad Daoud came into power as the president of Afghanistan. Though he is considered to be an authoritarian leader, he declared Afghanistan to be a republic during his rule.

== Khalqist Rule (1978-1979) and Civil War (1979-1992) ==
1978 saw the spawning of the Saur Revolution. This period of turmoil involved a coup led by Afghan Army officers loyal to the Khalq faction of the People's Democratic Party of Afghanistan (PDPA) which would take control of the government until and remain in power until 1992. On April 27, 1978, perpetrators of the revolution assassinated Daud and took control of the government.

The coup was orchestrated by Hafizullah Amin, who had Mir Akbar Khyber murdered on April 17, 1978. Many Parchamites at the time blamed Daoud while Daoud blamed Hezbi Islami Gulbuddin. Most of the PDPA leadership was arrested except Amin who ordered Khalqist officers to launch the Saur Revolution. The Pashtun Khalqist regime would launch mass repression especially against the Hazaras executing over 7,000 Hazaras in the span of a couple of months. A Hazara uprising in Kabul would be brutally suppressed between June and July of 1979 with over 10,000 Hazaras being arrested and executed. The Khalqists would also carpet bomb the city of Herat during a Tajik led Islamist uprising backed by the new fundamentalist government in Iran. It is estimated over 25,000 people were killed in the bombing of Herat.

In 1979 under General Secretary Nur Muhammad Taraki the Khalqists regime in Afghanistan changed the official map to include NWFP and Balochistan as new "frontier provinces" of the DRA. The Khalqist regime also sought to make Pashto the sole language of the Afghan government and the lingua franca, they did so by undermining Dari. The Afghan anthem at the time was only in Pashto and not Dari. Up until the overthrow of Dr Najibullah's Homeland Party regime in 1992, Afghan governments had favored Pashto in the media and over 50% of Afghan media was in Pashto. After 1992 with the formation of the Tajik led Islamic State of Afghanistan, this number dropped drastically.

== Continued Civil War and Taliban Rule (1992-2001) ==
Following the overthrow of the Najibullah Regime many Pashtun Khalqists in the Afghan Army allied with Hezbi Islami forming their own secular enclaves while nominally loyal to Hezbi Islami in their fight against the Tajik led Islamic State of Afghanistan. Many Khalqists would join the Taliban movement in the mid-1990s flying Mig-21s and driving T-62 Tanks. The Taliban would begin committing atrocities against their opponents, the Hazaras, Tajiks, and Uzbeks who would do the same to them. In 1998, the United Nations accused the Taliban of denying emergency food by the UN's World Food Program to 160,000 hungry and starving people (most of whom were Hazaras and Tajiks) "for political and military reasons". The UN stated that the Taliban were starving people for their military agenda and using humanitarian assistance as a weapon of war. The colonization of Pashtuns in the north and Pashtun nationalism was a major part of the ideology of the Afghan Communist regime, Monarchy and Taliban.

The Northern Alliance was formed in originally as an Anti Pashtun alliance against the perceived Pashtun ethnocentric Najibullah regime in 1992, it would be disbanded however it would reform in 1994 to fight the Taliban and was composed of Hazaras, Tajiks, and Uzbeks. The group was supported by a number of countries, such as the United States, Iran, Russia, and India. In 1997, the Northern Alliance killed 2,000 members of the Taliban that they had captured in conflicts between the two groups.

On August 8, 1998, the Taliban launched an attack on Mazar-i Sharif. Once in control, the Taliban began to kill people based on their ethnicity, especially Hazaras and Uzbeks. Men, women and children were hunted by Taliban forces as a result of the 1500-3000 Taliban fighters executed by the Uzbek Junbish-i Milli militia. This act of ethnic cleansing left an estimated 5,000 to 6,000 dead.

== The War in Afghanistan ==
In 2001, Human Rights Watch voiced the fear that ethnic violence in Afghanistan was likely to increase due to the escalation of conflict between factions. Thousands of Pashtun people became refugees as they fled Uzbek Junbish-i Milli troops, some of whom were reported as looting, raping and kidnapping. These crimes were said to have occurred when the troops were disarming Pashtuns accused of being former Taliban supporters in northern Afghanistan during the early stages of the War in Afghanistan (2001–2021) which removed the dominantly Pashtun Taliban from power.

== Political measures ==
In 2010 Afghan President Hamid Karzai set up a panel to investigate continuing ethnic violence as he believes it is hampering the military efforts to contain the Taliban insurgency.

== See also ==
- Anti-Afghan sentiment
- Anti-Hazara sentiment
- Anti-Pashtun sentiment
- Crime in Afghanistan
- Pashtun colonization of northern Afghanistan
- Pashtunization
