= Kabir Stori =

Pashtun nationalist and poet (1942–2006)

Coordinates: 34.63977°N 70.87424°E

- کبیر ستوری
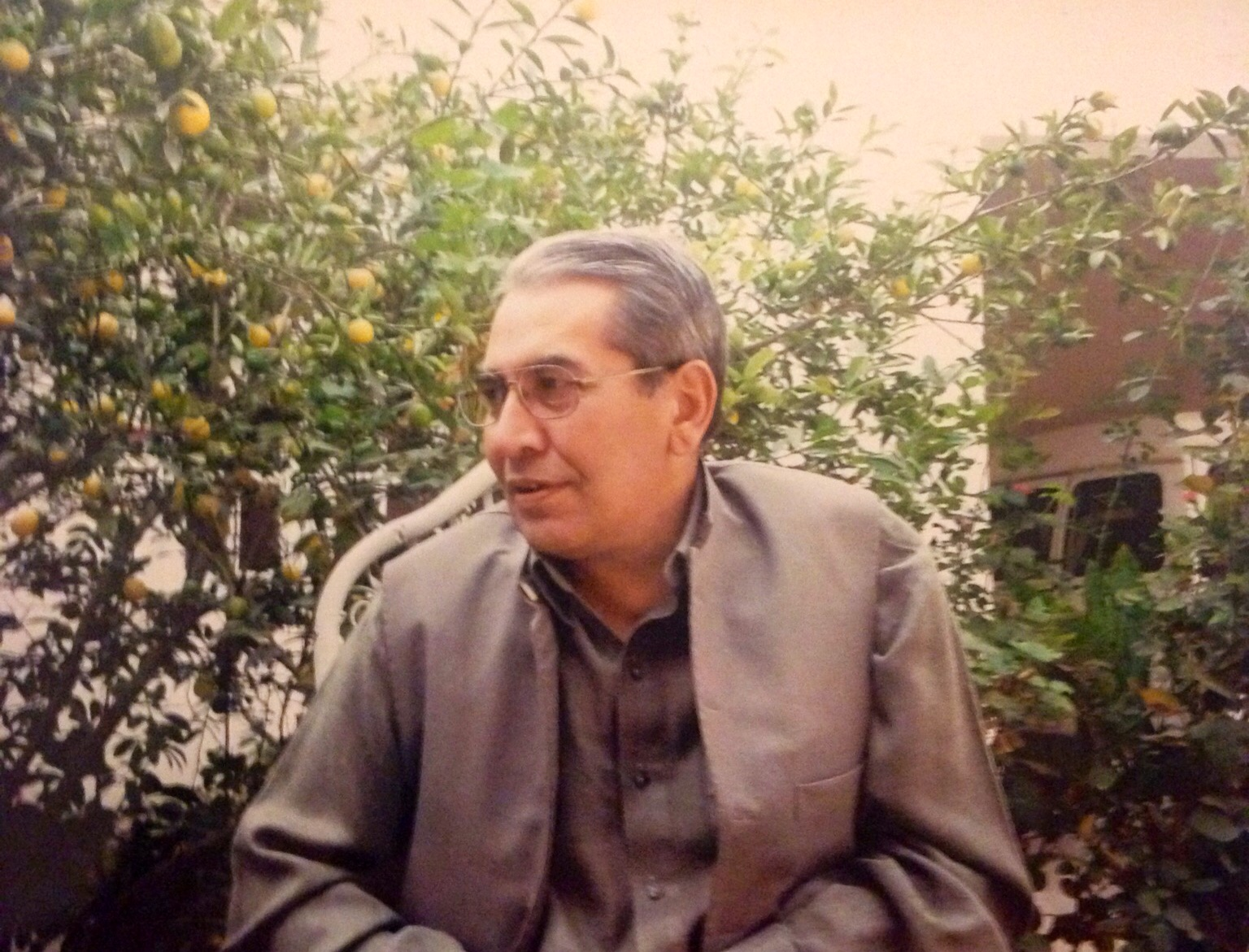
- Dr. Kabir Stori in his hometown of Khas Kunar

Chairperson of Pashtoons Social Democratic Party
- In office February 1981 – April 2006
- Vice President: Ali Khan Masood, Qoudus Tander, Mohammad Shirin Gerdeawal
- Succeeded by: Ali Khan Masood

Personal details
- Born: Abdul Kabir Stori; 6 April 1942 Khas Kunar, Kunar Province, Kingdom of Afghanistan
- Died: 4 April 2006 (aged 63) Wesseling, Germany
- Resting place: Khas Kunar, Kunar Province, Afghanistan
- Citizenship: German-Afghan
- Party: Pashtoons Social Democratic Party
- Relations: Shahmahmood Miakhel, Rasul Amin, Mir Zaman Khan
- Children: 7
- Parent: Lal Mohammad Khan
- Education: Psychology, Political Science, Sociology, Philosophy (Doctorate in Natural Sciences)
- Alma mater: University of Frankfurt, University of Cologne, University of Marburg
- Occupation: Poet, Writer, Political Activist
- Known for: Pashtun Nationalism, Poetry, Founding the Pashtoons Social Democratic Party
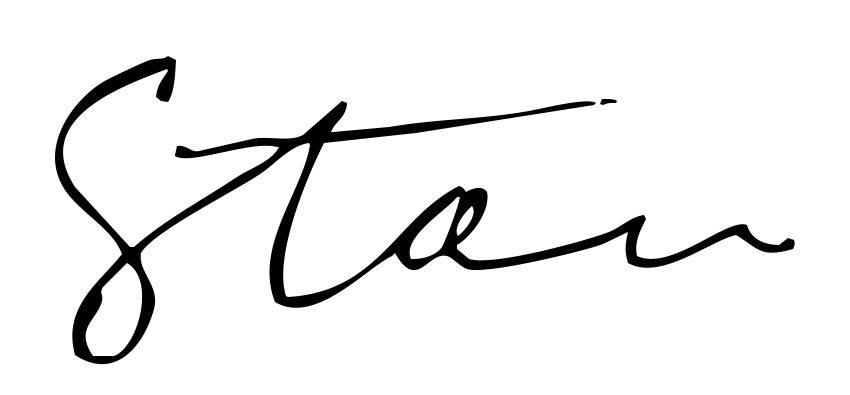
- Signature
- Website: Official Website

Kabir Stori (Pashto: کبیر ستوری, IPA: [kaˈbiɾ ˈstori]; 6 April 1942 – 4 April 2006) was a Pashtun nationalist, poet, and writer. He is the founder of the Pashtoons Social Democratic Party.

== Early life ==
Stori was born on 6 April 1942 in Khas Kunar, a village in Kunar Province of Afghanistan. Stori was Mirdadkhel, from the Yousafzai tribe.

His primary education was from a government elementary school in Khas Kunar; later he joined the Rahman Baba Lycee in Kabul to further his education. He was selected by the Afghan government due to very good school performance to study in Germany.

Kabir studied psychology with political science, sociology, and philosophy from the universities of Frankfurt, Cologne, and Marburg, attaining a doctorate in natural sciences (Diplom Psychologist, Dr. rer. nat.).

== Political activities ==
In 1966 Stori joined as a member of the Afghan Students Association in Frankfurt. He also served as joint founder of the General Union of Afghan Students in 1972 and the National Liberation Union of Pashtuns and Balochs in Frankfurt in 1976. He worked for the Deutsche Welle in 1973 as an announcer/editor and helped to build the Pashto Service. He founded the Pashtoons Social Democratic Party (PSDP) in February 1981 in Germany and was the first elected chairman.

Kabir Stori refused several offers from Mohammad Najibullah and Hamid Karzai to join the Afghan government but denied both on political grounds.

He also served on the editorial boards of various magazines including:

- Sparghai (1972) (monthly) published by the 'General Union of Afghan Students',
- Olas Ghag (1976) published by the 'National Liberation Union of Pashtoons and Baluchs',
- Peer Rokhan (1978) (monthly),
- Lamba (1985) (monthly),
- De Khyber Wagma (1986) (monthly) published in Germany and
- Pashtoonkhwa (1978) published by Social Democratic Party - Germany.

=== Arrest and Political Imprisonment ===
On 16 January 1983, Stori was arrested in Pakistan while visiting his family in Peshawar. The reason for his arrest was attributed to his endangerment of Pakistan's security through his advocacy for a united Pashtunistan, reflecting the political tensions and suppression of dissenting voices under the regime of General Zia-ul-Haq. Amnesty International received reports of Stori being subjected to torture. He spent approximately one and a half years in various prisons in Peshawar due to his nationalist ideals for Afghans. His plight came to the attention of leading political and diplomatic circles in the Federal Republic of Germany through the Deutsche Welle (Voice of Germany). The RFFU took steps to secure his release, and Hermann Schreiber, editor of the magazine, published a report on Stori's case in GEO magazine on 11 August 1983. Stori's detention was a result of his advocacy for the Pashtun cause and his opposition to the dictatorial government.

=== Creation of the PSDP ===
The Pashtoons Social Democratic Party (PSDP) is distinctively known as the first organization of its kind to operate branches across Europe, as well as in Afghanistan and Pakistan. Moreover, it is the only party to this day that represents and accepts Pashtuns from both countries, be it Afghanistan or Pakistan. The initial constitution of the PSDP was collaboratively penned by Dr. Kabir Stori, Ali Khan Masood, Liaqat Watanpal, and Qoudus Tandar.

Manzoor Pashteen, a notable figure in Pashtun activism, maintained a close relationship with the current chairman, Ali Khan Masood, who is also his grandfather. This relationship greatly influenced Pashteen's political actions, most notably the founding of the Pashtun Tahafuz Movement (PTM).

== Literary works ==
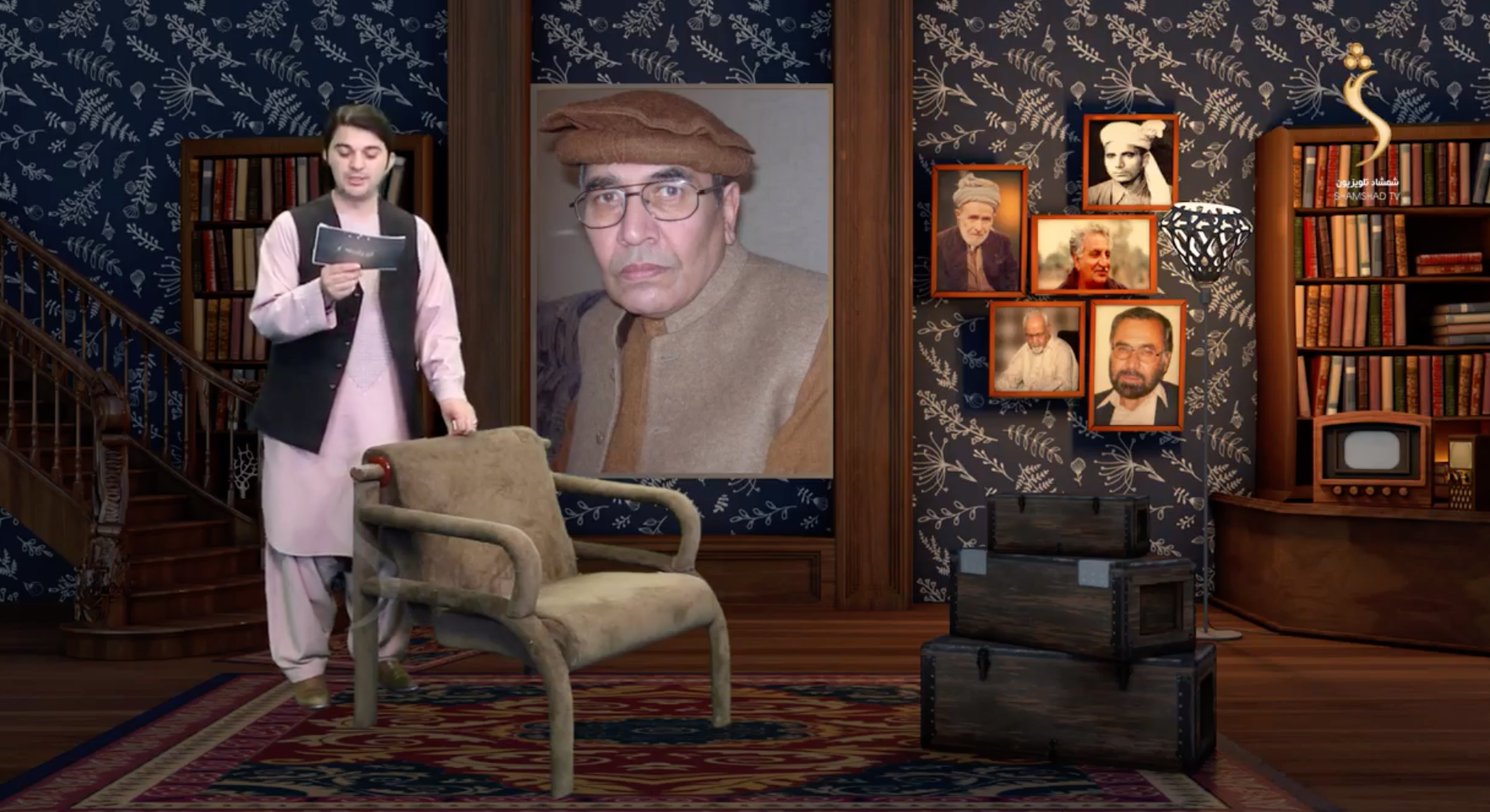
Shamshad TV coverage from 11 February 2020 about Stori's life

Stori’s poems are mostly about patriotism.

His poem collections include:

- Skarwatta (Embers): An Anthology of Poems,(1976, published together with another Afghan Poet, Germany)
- Jwandi Khyaloona (Alive Thoughts), (1997, Designed and printed by KOR, Publications Department, Peshawar Pakistan)
- De Qalam Tora (Sword of the Pen), (1999, Designed and printed by Danish Culture Association; Publisher: The Pakhtoonkhwa Home of Science, Peshawar/Pakistan)
- Sandareez Paigham (Message by the songs), (2002, Designed and printed by Danish Culture Association; Publisher: The Pakhtoonkhwa Home of Science, Peshawar/Pakistan)
- Khwagi Misrai (Sweetest Verses), (2006, Designed and printed by Danish Culture Association; Publisher: The Pakhtoonkhwa Home of Science, Peshawar/Pakistan)
- Kulyaat, (2007, Designed and printed by Danish Culture Association; Publisher: The Pakhtoonkhwa Home of Science, Peshawar/Pakistan)

== Stori's poetry ==
Stori wrote a collection of poetry's, the most famous verse he wrote was about his love for Pashto:

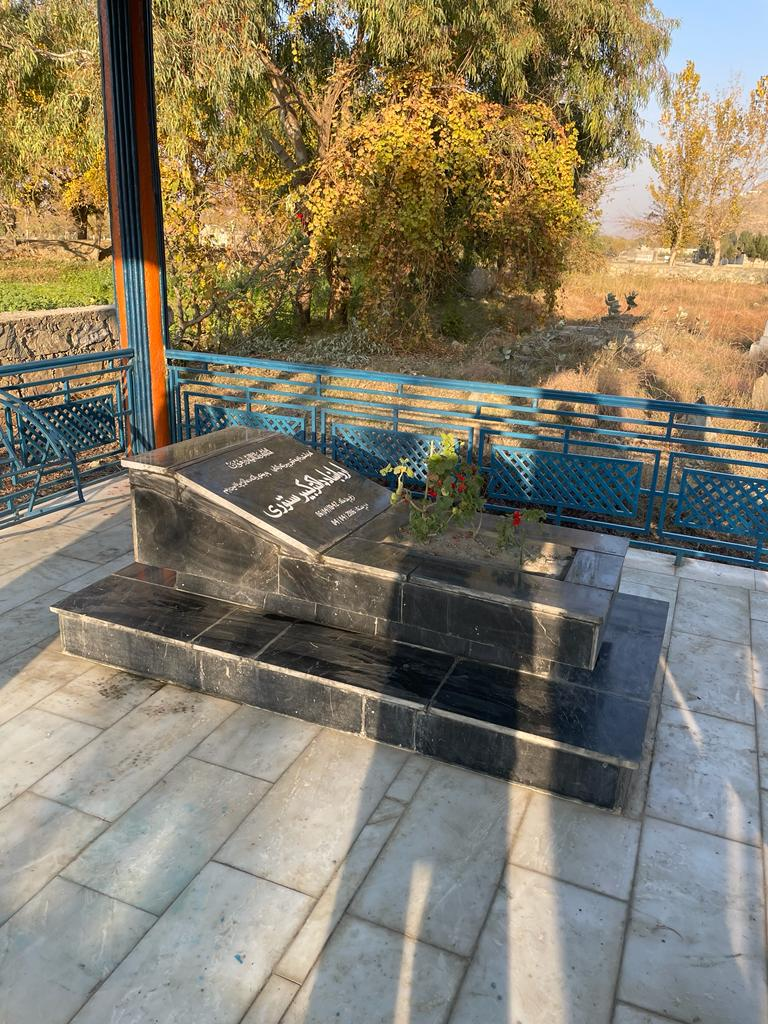
The gravestone with flowers

ساھ مې واخله خو پښــتو رانه وا نه اخلې

Sa me wakhla kho Pashto rana wa nakhle

Take my breath but don't take my Pashto

زهء پښــتون یم په پښـتو باندې پتمن یم

Sa Pashtun yem pa Pakhto bande Patman yem

I'm Pashtun, respected by Pashto

كه زما ستوري په قبر چېرې راشې

Ka sama Stori pa kaber chera rashe

If you come to Stori's grave

پهء پښتو راته دعا كړه، پرې مېن يم

Pa Pashto rata dawa wakra par mayen yem

Pray for me in Pashto because I'm in love with it

== Research works ==
His psychological works include

- Wira (Fear): theories, measurement and therapy of fear, (1985, 1990 Germany; 2001, Peshawar Pakistan, printed by KOR, Publications Department; Publisher: The Pakhtoonkhwa Home of Science, Peshawar/Pakistan)
- De Wire Tala (Psychology), (1992, Germany)
- De Hukhyartia Tala (Intelligence-Test), (2000, Designed and printed by KOR, Publications Department; Publisher: The Pakhtoonkhwa Home of Science, Peshawar/Pakistan)
- Zabsapohana (Language Psychology), (2000, Designed and printed by Danish Culture Association; Publisher: The Pakhtoonkhwa Home of Science, Peshawar/Pakistan)
- De Hokhyartia Kulturi be Palawa Tala (Kulturfairer Intelligenz-Test (C-I- T)) in three languages (Pashtu, English and German), (2004, Designed and printed by KOR, Publications Department; Publisher: The Pakhtoonkhwa Home of Science, Peshawar/Pakistan)
- De Pedaikhti Banno De Hokhyartia Tala (Naturformen des Intelligenztests (N-I-T), in three languages (Pashtu, English and German), (2004, Designed and printed by KOR, Publications Department; Publisher: The Pakhtoonkhwa Home of Science, Peshawar/Pakistan)

== Death and tributes ==
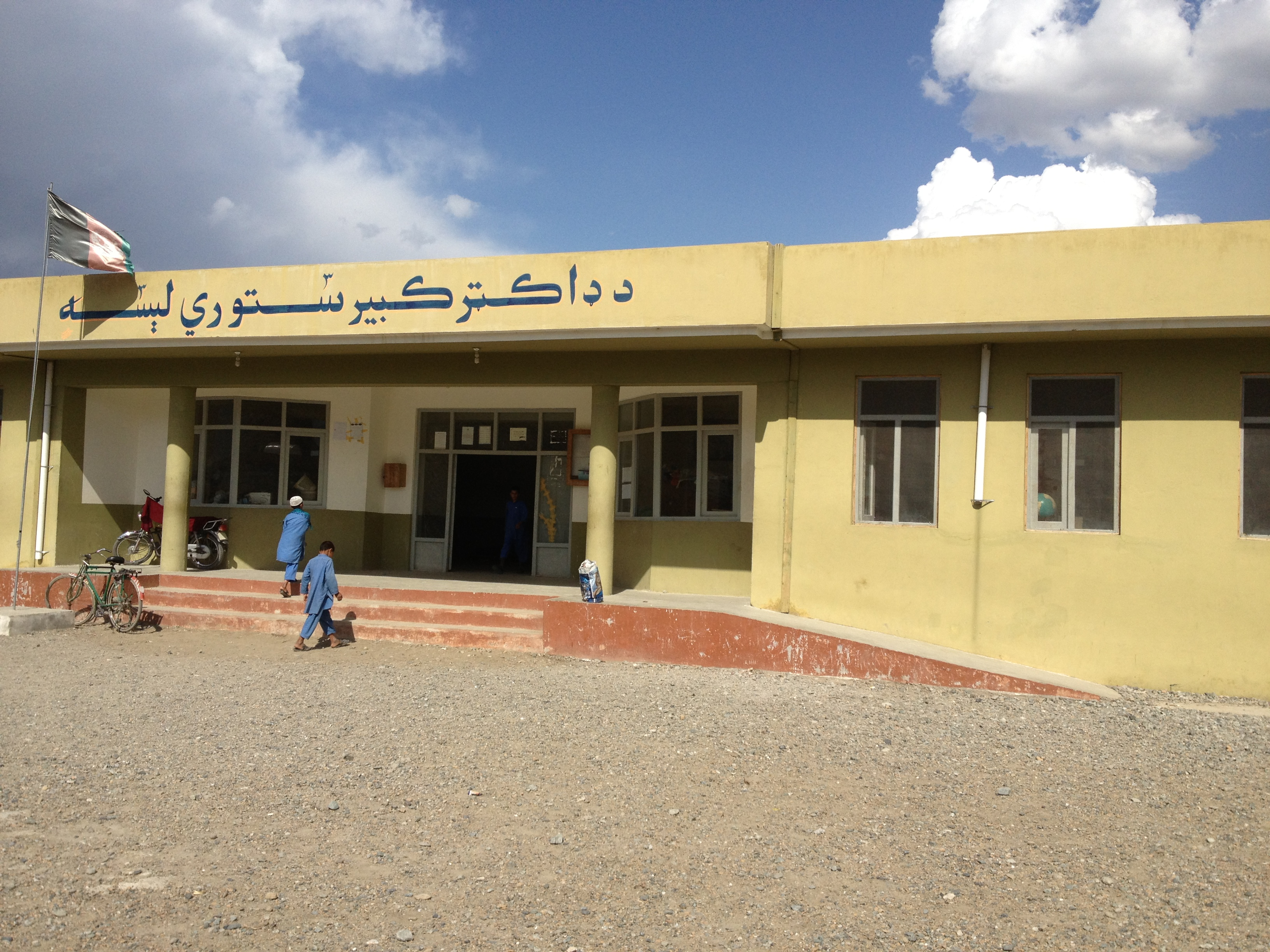
Picture of the entry of the Lycée

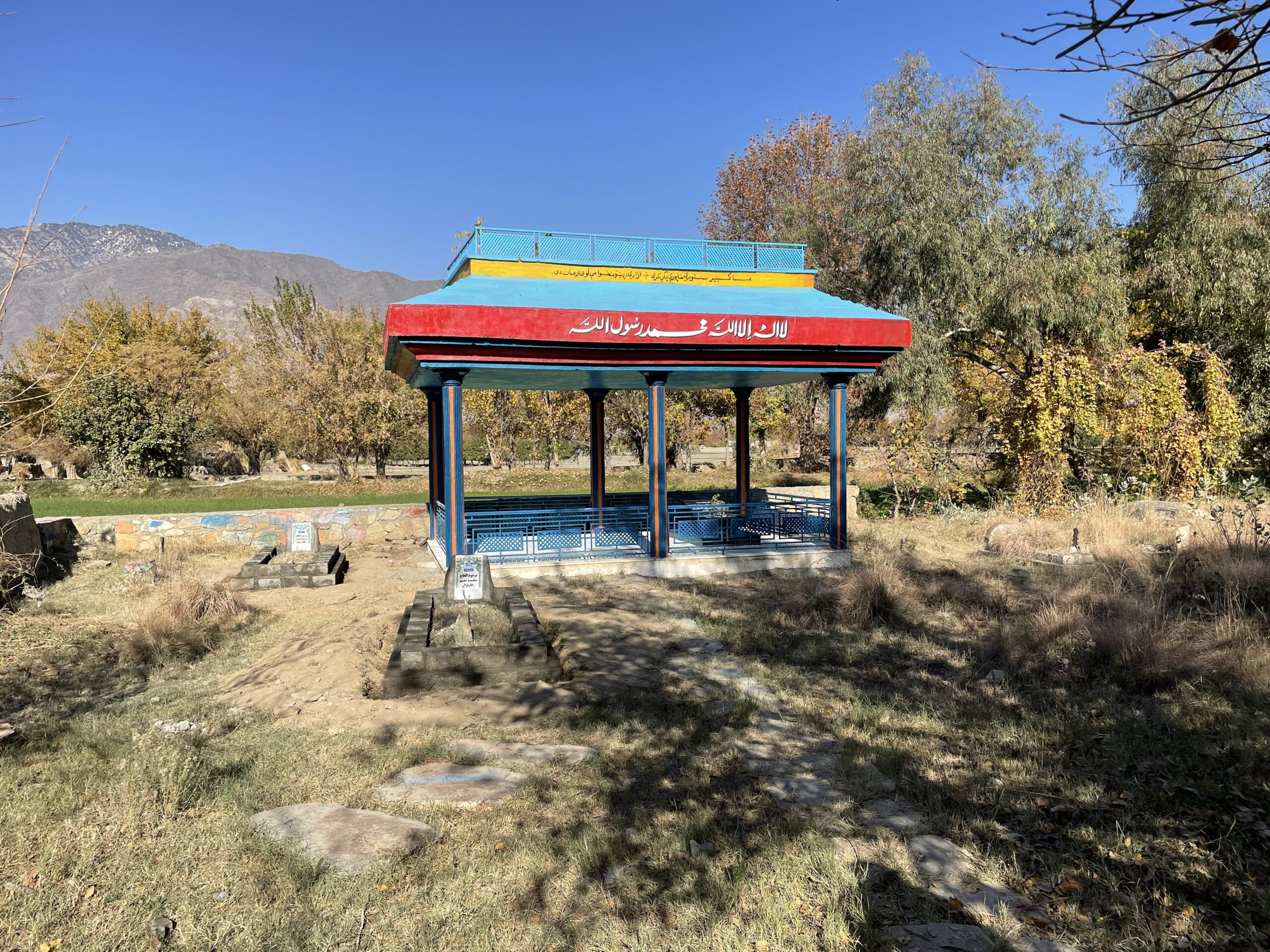
Tomb in Khas Kunar

Stori suffered a heart attack and died on 4 April 2006 at 05:32 AM in Wesseling, Germany. He was buried in his native graveyard in Khas Kunar, Afghanistan.

On the 7th anniversary of his death, the school in his hometown was renamed from "Khas Kunar Lycee" to "Dr. Kabir Stori Lycee" by the government from Afghanistan.

== See also ==
- Pashto literature and poetry
- Pashtun nationalism
- Khas Kunar District
- Afzal Khan Lala
- Raj Wali Shah Khattak
- Pashtoons Social Democratic Party
- Manzoor Pashteen
- Pashto
- Pashtunistan
