= Organisation of Toilers' Fedayan of Afghanistan =

Organisation of Toilers' Fedayan of Afghanistan سازمان فداییان زحمتکشان افغانستان
- Leader: Maulawi Bahauddin Ba'es
- Split from: Settam-e-Melli
- Preceded by: Revolutionary Toilers Society of Afghanistan
- Succeeded by: National Congress Party of Afghanistan
- Ideology: Islamic socialism Anti-Pashtunism
- Political position: Left-wing
- National affiliation: People's Democratic Party of Afghanistan
- Political Coalition: Union of Left-Democratic Parties

Organisation of Toilers' Fedayan of Afghanistan (Persian: سازمان فداییان زحمتکشان افغانستان, abbreviated سفزا, transliterated Sazman-e-Fedayan-e-Zahmatkashan Afghanistan, 'SAFZA') was a left-wing group in Afghanistan. It was formed after a section of youth cadres had broken away from the Setam-e-Milli group. Like the Settam-e-Milli grouping and its later incarnation SAZA, SAFZA was part of the 'ethnic left' based amongst the peoples from Greater Khorasan, Southern Turkestan to Badakhshan, opposed to Pashtun political dominance.

The founders of SAFZA had broken away from the Settam-e-Milli group, arguing that the movement should to uphold continue the line of armed struggle, also after the Saur Revolution. It formed a militia force operating in the Northern and North-Eastern parts of the country.

The main leader of SAFZA was Maulawi Bahauddin Ba'es, who described himself as an Islamic socialist.

After a failed uprising in Badakhshan in August 1979, Ba'es was captured and killed in captivity. SAFZA was officially disbanded in 1984, and the remaining leaders joined the then governing People's Democratic Party of Afghanistan. However, SAFZA militias continued to operate. The remaining SAFZA militia elements in Darvaz district, Badakhshan were demobilised through the United Nations Disarmament, Demobilization and Reintegration programme in 2004.

== Prominent former members ==
- Noor Mohammad Qarqeen, the former Minister of Labour, Social Affairs, Martyred, and Disabled.
- Latif Pedram, a candidate in the 2004 presidential election, was a SAFZA cadre who joined the PDPA government.
