= PSDP =

PSDP may refer to:

- Pashtoons Social Democratic Party, political party in Afghanistan and Pakistan
- Phalon-Sawaw Democratic Party, a political party in Myanmar
