= Ajmal Shams =

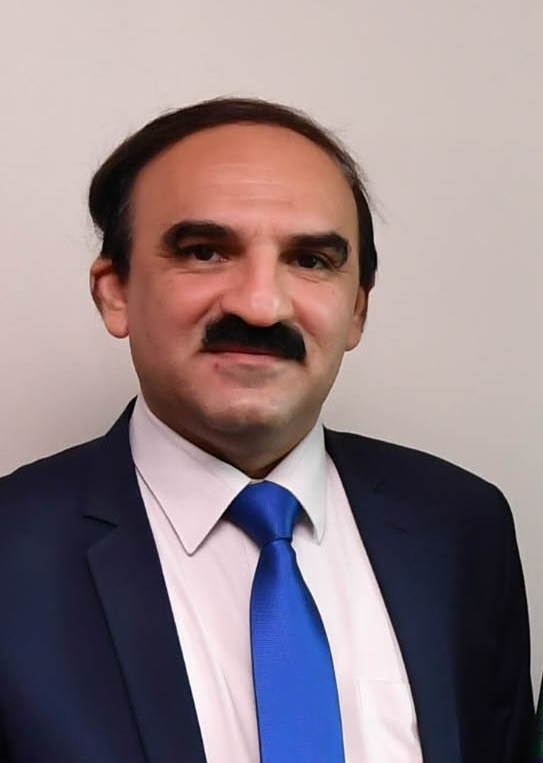
- Ajmal Shams in 2020

President of the Afghan Mellat Party (Shams Faction)
- Incumbent
- Assumed office October 2005
- Preceded by: Shams-ul-Huda Shams

Personal details
- Born: Kunar Province, Afghanistan
- Party: Afghan Mellat Party

Ajmal Shams is an Afghan politician and former civil engineer. Shams has been vice president of the Afghan Social Democratic Party since February 2021 and previously served as president since October 2005 till 2021. He served as Deputy Minister of the Ministry of Urban Development and Housing in the Afghan Government since December 2016 till June 2018. He speaks Pashto, Persian, English and Urdu.

He is a certified Project Management Professional (PMP) with Project Management Institute (PMI) and a Licensed Professional Engineer in the state of Kentucky, USA.

Shams is a regular columnist in the Middle East's reputed English daily newspaper Arab News mainly writing on political, developmental and economic issues of Afghanistan. He also contributes opinion articles for various other international media outlets including Foreign Policy, The Diplomat, The National Interest, Gulf News, Global Times (China), Korea Times and others.

== Early life ==
Shams is an ethnic Pashtun. His father was the late Shamsul Huda Shams, the former president of the Afghan Social Democratic (Mellat) Party.

Shams pursued his education in Peshawar, graduated from the University of Engineering and Technology, Peshawar with a B.Sc. degree in civil engineering. Upon graduation he worked as a lecturer at Khyber Institute of Technology. He taught for several years. He studied Water Resources and Environmental Engineering in the United States. In 2002, he obtained his master's degree in civil engineering from South Dakota School of Mines and Technology. He worked as an environmental engineer for a consulting engineering firm in Florida for about a year before returning home to participate in the reconstruction and development of his homeland.

== Professional Career and Public Service ==
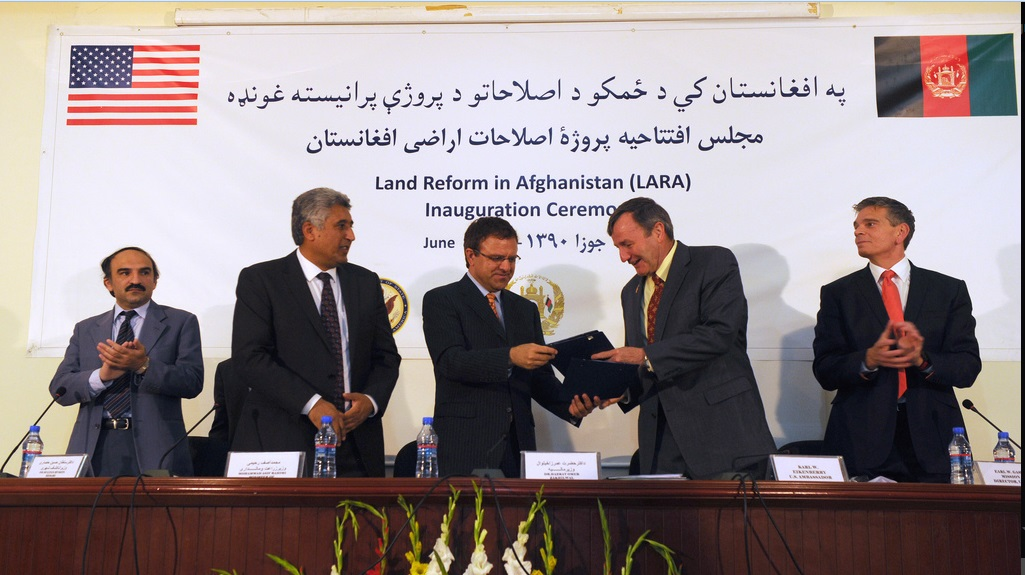
Ajmal Shams at the signing ceremony of USAID funded Land Reform Project along with US Ambassador Eikenberry and Afghan Ministers of Finance Dr. Omar Zakhilwal - June 2011

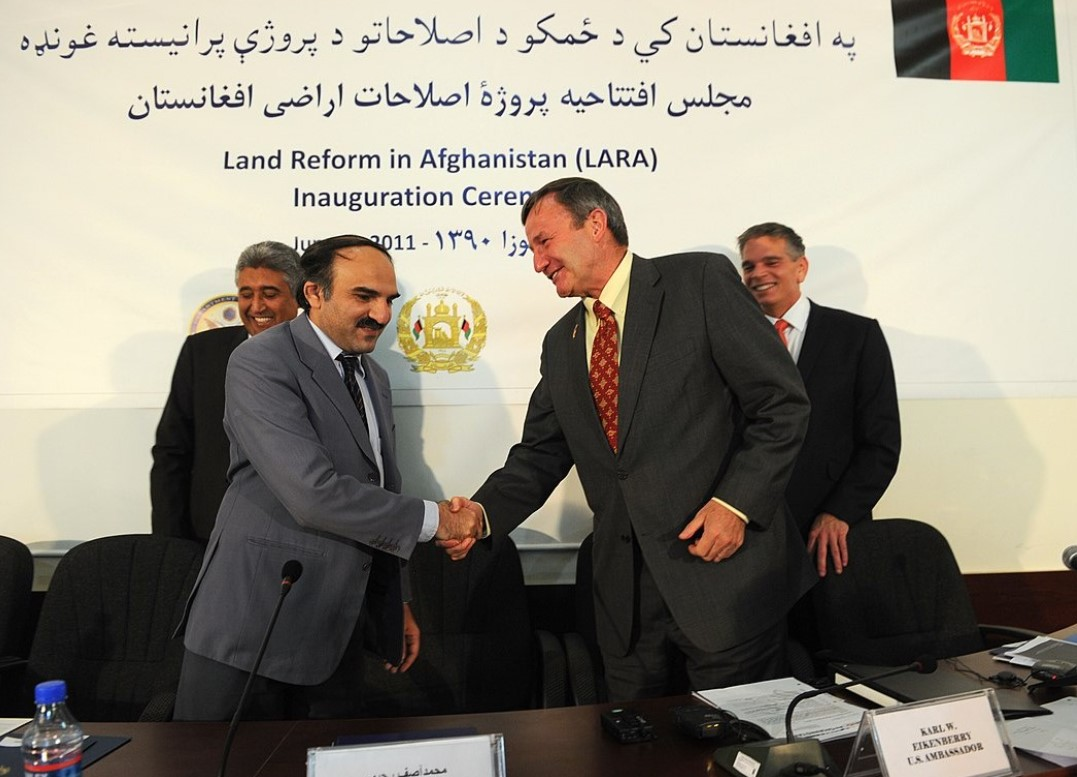
Ajmal Shams shaking hand with US Ambassador Karl Eikenberry at the signing ceremony of LARA Project-June 2011

Shams worked for about two years as head of the water resources section of the International Organization for Migration (IOM) in Kabul and served briefly as Head of the Engineering Department of the National Solidarity Program in the Ministry of Rural Rehabilitation and Development.

In 2007, Shams went to United Arab Emirates (UAE) in a senior engineering position where he participated in large-scale infrastructure projects including the Sheikh Zyed Grand Mosque in Abu Dhabi. In 2009, he returned to Afghanistan and rejoined the Ministry of Rural Development where he served in the reputed National Solidarity Program for about a year.

In September 2010, Shams joined Ministry of Urban Development as Director of Planning and Policy. He was instrumental in negotiating the US Government support for Afghanistan's land reform program. On 8 June 2011, the US Government provided $40 million in financial support to the Afghan Government as part of efforts to bring reforms in the land management and administration. The aid agreement was signed by Mr. Shams together with the US Ambassador Karl Eikenberry, the USAID Director, Minister Zakhilwal and Minister Asif Rahimi.

In July 2011, Shams joined as Policy Advisor to the Chairman of the Afghanistan Transition Coordination Commission, Dr. Ashraf Ghani, the current President of the Islamic Republic of Afghanistan. Ajmal Shams was appointed as Deputy Minister of the Ministry of Urban Development and Housing by President Ashraf Ghani in December 2016 and served till June 2018.

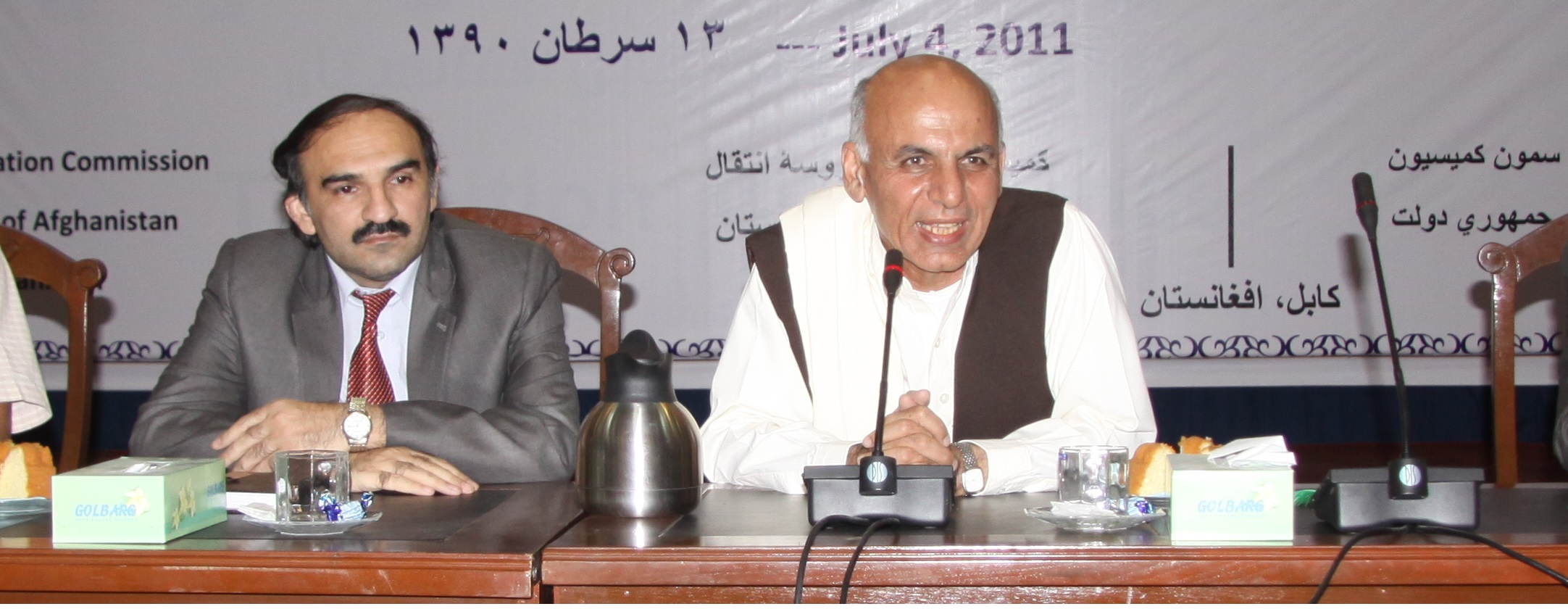
Ajmal Shams with Dr. Ashraf Ghani during a transition conference

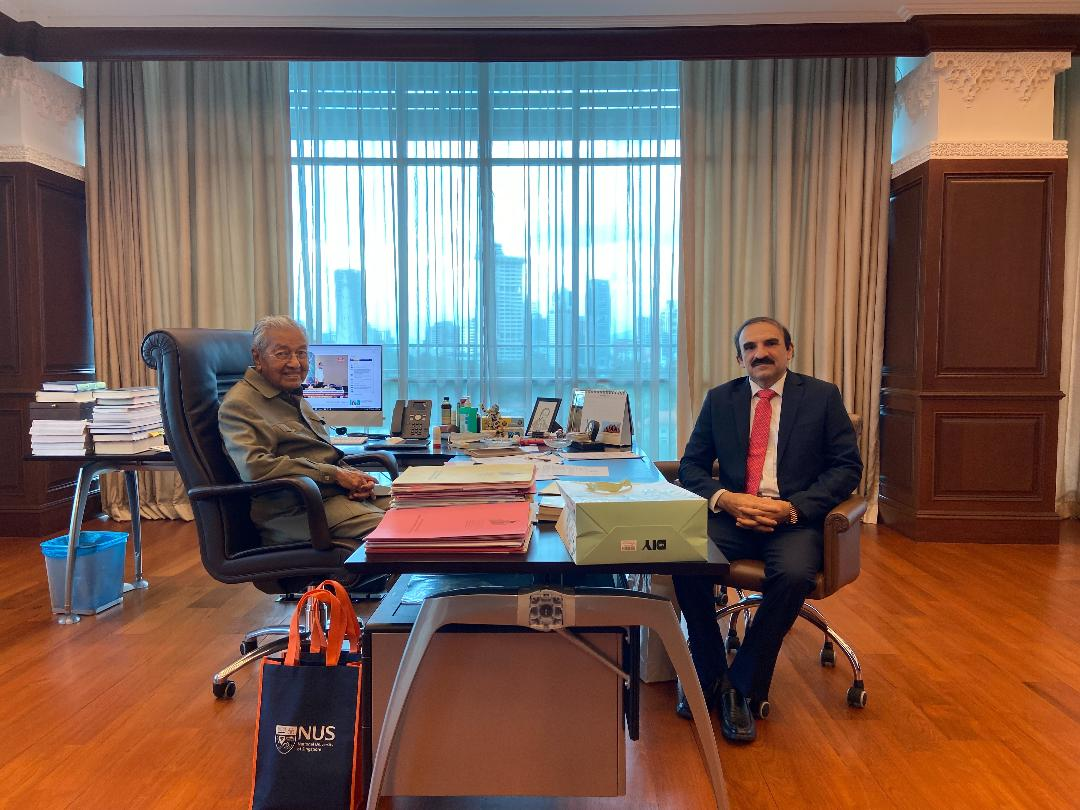
Ajmal Shams with Mahathir Mohamad, the Former Prime Minister of Malaysia, November 2022

== Political and Party Affairs ==
Shams has been president of Afghanistan Social Democratic Party since October 2005. He was elected by the party congress soon after his father's demise. Afghanistan Social Democratic Party, since its establishment in 1966, has been struggling peacefully for a developed and progressive Afghanistan within the framework of Afghanistan's national Islamic character. The party believes in social justice as part of its economic program. Afghanistan Social Democratic Party, which is also well known as Afghan Millat National Progressive Party, was registered by the Afghan Ministry of Justice in 2007.

During the 2014 Presidential Election, Shams' party supported Ashraf Ghani and actively participated in his campaign efforts.

== See also ==
- Afghan Mellat
