= Afghan Mellat Party =

Afghan Social Democratic Party افغان ټولنپال ولسواکیز ګوند
- Leader: Stanagul Sherzad
- Founder: Ghulam Mohammad Farhad
- Founded: 8 March 1966 (60 years, 175 days)
- Banned: 16 August 2023 (3 years, 14 days)
- Ideology: Pashtun nationalism (Ethnocentrism); Pashtunization; Social democracy Historical: Fascism (claimed)

The Afghan Social Democratic Party (Pashto: افغان ټولنپال ولسواکیز ګوند, Âfgan-e Tevâlnupal-e Vâlsuakâiz-e Gund), more commonly known as the Afghan Mellat Party (افغان ملت ګوند – Afğān Mellat Gund; "Afghan Nation Party") or simply the Afghan Mellat, is a Pashtun nationalist political party in Afghanistan. The party's leadership describes it as social democratic, although it has been historically described as 'ethno fascist' by observers. The party's current leader is Stanagul Sherzad, who became the new leader after the 6th party congress on October 3, 2012.

== History ==
Afghan Social Democratic Party was founded on March 8, 1966, by a group of influential bureaucrats associated with the ruling elites. However, it was officially declared on March 27 of that year.

Ghulam Mohammad Farhad, a German educated Pashtun intellectual, served as the first President of the party. Farhad had studied in Nazi Germany and was fascinated by some aspects of Nazism. Afghan Mellat looks after the interests of the Pashtun ethnic group and has its support only from them. The party favors the ideas of Pashtunization of Afghanistan and a Greater Afghanistan (i.e. it claims the Pashtun-speaking parts of Pakistan for Afghanistan). This has led the Afghan Mellat to be referred to as 'ethno fascist' by observers however the party maintains that it is social democratic.

In the 1969 parliamentary elections, Farhad was elected to the parliament.

After the Saur Revolution in 1978, the party was banned. Farhad was imprisoned, but released in 1980.

In exile in Pakistan, the party operated under the auspices of the National Islamic Front of Afghanistan.

In 1986–1987, dialogues took place between the government and the party and some leading party members were released from prison. However, the party chose to stay outside of the governing coalition. The relations with the government split the party into three factions; with one faction led by Shams-ul-Huda Shams, one by Qudratullah Hadad and the other by Mohammad Amin Wakman. It is Wakman faction that is currently led by Afghanistan's Finance Minister, Anwar-ul-Haq Ahady, the son-in-law of the NIFA leader Pir Gailani.

== Wakman branch ==
In 1995 Anwar-ul-Haq Ahady took over the Wakman branch. Under his leadership, the party toned down its Pashtun nationalist profile and sought support amongst non-Pashtuns. The Wakman branch of the party is recognized by the Afghan government as the "Afghan Millat Party"

After the fall of the Taliban government, the party leader Ahady has been included in the government as Finance Minister. The party supported Hamid Karzai in the presidential election and receives support from Karzai. The party has around 10 MPs. The party officially registered themselves in Afghanistan on May 16, 2004.

== Shams branch ==
Shams-ul-Huda Shams applied for recognition of his party in 2004, but it was under Ajmal Shams, his son, that it achieved official recognition in May 2007 as "Afghan Mellat Milli Motaraqi Gwand – افغان ملت ملي مترقي ګوند" (Afghan National People's Progressive Party).

== History of leaders ==
#	Picture	Leader	From	To	Death	Notes
1		Ghulam Mohammad Farhad	March 8, 1966	1984	1984	–
2		Mohammad Amin Wakman	1987	1995	–	–
3		Anwar-ul-Haq Ahady	1995	–	–	–
4		Shams-ul-Huda Shams	1987	2005	2005	Shams led his own faction of Afghan Mellat Party

== See also ==
- Pashtun question
