= Shamankhel =

Mahsud Pashtun subtribe

Shamankhel or Shaman Khel (Pashto: شمن خېل) is one of the Mahsud subtribes. They live in three different places in South Waziristan. Ladha, Sararogha, and Serwekai.

== Sub-castes ==
Shamankhel are divided by four sub-castes:

- Chiyarkhel
- Khalikhel
- Badinzai
- Galishai

== Notable people ==
- Manzoor Pashteen
