= Toilers Organisation of Afghanistan =

Political party in Afghanistan

Toilers Organisation of Afghanistan (Dari: سازمان زحمتکشان افغانستان, abbreviated سزا, transliterated Sazman-e Zahmatkashan-e Afghanistan, 'SeZA') was a left wing group in Afghanistan. It was formed by PDPA dissidents, which had broken away from the PDPA in the late 1970s. The leader of the organisation was Hamdullah Gran. The party was mainly based amongst Pashtuns.

In November 1987 SeZA was able to assume overground activities and joined the PDPA-led Union of Left-Democratic Parties. However, a dissident SeZA faction, led by Zaman Gul Dehati, remained underground. This grouping later became the Alliance of Peace and Progress Fighters of Afghanistan.
