= Mohammad Amin Wakman =

Afghan politician

Mohammad Amin Wakman محمد امين واکمن
- Born: November 1, 1939; Afghanistan
- Title: Head of Afghan Mellat Party
- Predecessor: Ghulam Mohammad Farhad
- Successor: Anwar ul-Haq Ahady
- Political party: Afghan Mellat

Mohammad Amin Wakman (Pashto: محمد امين واکمن - born 1939) is an Afghan politician and the Honorary Chairman and Director of International Affairs of Afghan Millat Party.

Mohammad Amin Wakman was born on November 1, 1939, in Maidan Wardag Province of Afghanistan. He is the son of Brigadier Mia Sahib Khan.

== Education ==
Amin completed his primary education in Maidan Wardag Province and secondary education in the High School of Business and Commerce in Kabul.

In 1964, he graduated from the Faculty of Journalism of Kabul University.

Amin received a Master of Arts, Master of Philosophy and Ph.D. in political science, diplomatic studies and international affairs from Jawaharlal Nehru University, New Delhi, India .

== Work life ==
After completing his secondary education, Amin worked with the United Nations mission in Kabul. In 1965, he served as a reservist in the Afghan Army.

After completing his time in the Afghan Army, he was appointed as the Chief of Protocol in the Ministry of Information and Culture of Afghanistan.

Amin was appointed as a Pashto broadcaster with Radio Ankara, Turkey. He was assigned as the director of information and culture of Jowzjan Province and the chief editor of Deewa Daily newspaper when he returned to Afghanistan. Later on, he worked with All India Radio as a Pashto broadcaster. Amin ended his career with the Afghan Government in April 1978, after the communist coup.

Amin also worked as a writer and broadcaster with Voice of America in Washington, D.C., United States.

== Party involvement ==
In 1966, Amin took part in the establishment of the Afghan Mellat Party. He was elected as the Secretary General of the Afghan Mellat party when it was in exile in Peshawar.

As a representative of Afghan Mellat party, Amin attended World Congress of the Social Democratic Parties in 1980, 1984 and 1988 in Spain and Portugal, 1992 in Berlin, Germany and 1997 in New York City, USA.

Amin was elected as the chairman of the party in 1987 in Peshawar and re-elected to the same position in the mid-term election in 1989. He was elected as the Honorary Chairman and Director of International Affairs of the party in the fourth general congress.

== Academic works ==
Amin Wakman has written several books and more than six hundred articles in Pashto, Dari and English languages. He is the author of the following books:

Books in English

- Afghanistan At the Crossroads
- Afghanistan, Non-Alignment and the Super Powers (February 1986)

Books in Pashto

- Social Democracy
- De Afghanistan Milli Nahzatoona - دافغانستان ملي نهضتونه
