= Alliance of Peace and Progress Fighters of Afghanistan =

Alliance of Peace and Progress Fighters of Afghanistan (Itifaq-e Mubarezan-e Solh wa Taraqi-ye Afghanistan), a political faction in Afghanistan led by Zaman Gul Dehati, which emerged from a dissident faction within the Toilers Organisation of Afghanistan. The group joined the Union of Left-Democratic Parties sometime around 1988–1989.

The organisation spent most of the 1990s organised in exile. It established liaisons with the United Nations Special Mission to Afghanistan office in Kabul, and was invited to the 2001 Bonn conference. However, a shift in the UNSMA office resulted in the group being degraded to observers at the conference. When the other invitees of the Bonn conference formed the Council of Defenders of Peace and Democracy the following year, the Alliance remained outside of it, as the Alliance lacked an organisational base inside Afghanistan at the time. In January 2003, it joined, along with the CDPD and others, the National Front for Democracy in Afghanistan, founded in Islamabad.
