= Union of Left-Democratic Parties =

Political party

Union of Left-Democratic Parties اتحاد احزاب چپ دموکراتیک
- Founded: November 1987
- Dissolved: May 1992
- Members: PDPA; JAZA; SeZA

Union of Left-Democratic Parties (Dari: اتحاد احزاب چپ دموکراتیک) was an alliance of political parties in the Democratic Republic of Afghanistan. The Union was formed in November 1987, in a process of opening a multi-party system in the country. The founders of the Union were the governing People's Democratic Party of Afghanistan, Revolutionary Toilers Organisation of Afghanistan and the Toilers Organisation of Afghanistan. The Peasants Justice Party of Afghanistan participated as an observer.

The Young Workers Organisation of Afghanistan and the Alliance of Peace and Progress Fighters of Afghanistan joined the alliance sometime around 1988–1989.
