= Anti-Pashtun sentiment =

Dislike or hostility towards Pashtuns

Anti-Pashtun sentiment refers to prejudice, discrimination, or hostility directed towards Pashtuns, Pashtun culture, or the Pashto language. Historically, this sentiment has roots in the British colonial era, where Pashtuns were characterised in official accounts as fiercely independent and resistant to state authority. These portrayals were used to justify control policies in the tribal regions of present-day Pakistan and Afghanistan.

In modern Pakistan, socio-political dynamics have sometimes contributed to perceptions of Pashtun communities as distinct or challenging to state authority. The advocacy for Pashtun rights, such as by the Pashtun Tahafuz Movement (PTM), has occasionally resulted in accusations of marginalisation or misrepresentation of Pashtuns in official narratives.

In Afghanistan, tensions have been reported between Pashtuns and other ethnic groups, particularly in regions dominated by Tajiks and Hazaras. Human Rights Watch has documented violence and displacement targeting Pashtuns, particularly after the fall of the Taliban regime in 2001.

Stereotypes in media and public discourse have also shaped perceptions of Pashtuns. In some cases, Pashtuns have been associated with extremism or militancy, reinforcing societal biases.

== Afghanistan ==
The traditional rivalry for power and influence between the Pashtun majority and the other ethnic groups of Afghanistan such as the Tajiks, Hazaras, Uzbeks and Turkmen, have often stirred anti-Pashtun sentiments among the latter. In 1975, a Jamiat-e Islami uprising broke out in Panjsher Valley against the rule of Afghan prime minister and Nationalist Daoud Khan, which was alleged by some to have been "sparked by anti-Pashtun frustrations. The Settam-e-Melli, led by Tajik activist Tahir Badakhshi, has been described as "an anti-Pashtun leftist mutation." According to Nabi Misdaq, the Settem-e-Melli "had an internal programme of provoking minorities to armed resurrection to stand up to Pashtuns." Settem opposed the Pashtun-dominated, Khalq-led government in Kabul and is believed to be responsible for the murder of Adolph Dubs. The Shalleh-ye Javiyd, a Maoist political party founded in the 1960s that predominantly drew support from Shi'a Muslims and Hazaras, was similarly opposed to Pashtun rule in Afghanistan.

However, Misdaq notes that these anti-Pashtun stances were usually engraved more in a "Shi'a-versus-Sunni Afghan", "Dari-speaking-intellectuals-versus-Pashtun-rulers" and "majority-versus-minority" context rather than resentment on misrule or mistreatment by Pashtun kings and dynasties. This could be because Afghan dynasties such as the Durrani Empire, although Pashtun by origin, had been considerably Persianised and had even adopted the Dari language over Pashto; this cultural assimilation made the Durranis culturally familiar to Dari-speaking non-Pashtuns and neutralized any ethnic hegemony.

The Rabanni government which ruled Afghanistan in the early and mid-1990s was viewed by the Taliban as corrupt, anti-Pashtun and responsible for civil war.

A Human Right Watch (HRW) report published in 2002 stated that, 'following the collapse of Taliban regime in Northern Afghanistan in 2001, a rise in Anti-Pashtun violence was reported in Northern Afghanistan. Ethnic Pashtuns from that area were subject to widespread abuses like killings, sexual violence, beatings, extortion, and looting'. The Pashtuns were particularly targeted because their ethnicity was closely associated with Taliban, which could not be neglected by any evidence. The HRW report held three ethnically based parties like Uzbek Junbish-i-Milli Islami Afghanistan, Tajik Jamiat-e Islami and Hazara Hezbe Wahdat responsible for the abuses against Pashtuns in northern Afghanistan, but these accusations are confirmed only by the Pashtuns. Many Afghan Pashtuns also held the Northern Alliance responsible for the abuses committed against the Pashtuns communities in the rest of Afghanistan.

Pashtuns are also stereotyped as 'wild and barbaric' in Afghanistan by non-Pashtun Afghans and by some other Pashtun Sub-Tribes.

Many Afghan Pashtuns viewed the Afghan National Army (ANA) as being dominated by a Tajik-led anti-Pashtun ethnic coalition. The Tajiks, on the other hand, view the Pashtun population as largely aligned with the Taliban. This in turn has created a civil war-like situation in Afghanistan.

== Pakistan ==
Following independence, one of the factors of resentment among Pashtun population was the British-inherited name of the North-West Frontier Province, which did not represent Pashtuns unlike provinces e.g. Punjab, Sindh, Balochistan which were all named after their resident ethnic groups. Rajmohan Gandhi mentions that "persisting with the imperial name for a former empire's frontier province was nothing but anti-Pathan discrimination."

== See also ==
- Pashtun colonization of northern Afghanistan
- Pathan joke
- Anti-Afghan sentiment
- Anti-Pakistan sentiment
