= Ali Khan Masood =

Pakistani politician

- علي خان محسود

Chairperson of the Pashtoons Social Democratic Party
- Incumbent
- Assumed office April 2006
- Preceded by: Kabir Stori

Personal details
- Born: 10 May 1949 (age 76); Shahu Tangai, South Waziristan
- Political party: Pashtoons Social Democratic Party (PSDP)
- Relations: Manzoor Pashteen (great-nephew)
- Parent: Qazi Amir Shah (father)
- Occupation: Politician, lawyer, writer, historian
- Known for: Afghan-Pashtun nationalism

Ali Khan Masood (Pashto: علي خان محسود; also known as Ali Khan Maseed or Ali Khan Mahsud; born 10 May 1949) is a writer, researcher, historian, and advocate known for his extensive work in Pashtun political and cultural rights and as the President of the Pashtoons Social Democratic Party (PSDP).

He is also recognized as the maternal uncle of the father of Manzoor Pashteen, the leader of the Pashtun Tahafuz Movement (PTM).

== Early life and education ==
Ali Khan Masood was born on 10 May 1949, in Shahu Tangai, South Waziristan. He began his early education at the village primary school, continued his middle school in Wana, completed high school in Tank, and earned his B.A. from Government College Dera Ismail Khan. During his college years, he served as the General Secretary of the Gomal Union. He later pursued a master's degree in political science from Peshawar University and an LL.B from Khyber Law College.

After completing his B.A., he joined the Political Science Department at Peshawar University. Upon completing his M.A., he enrolled at Khyber Law College and won the presidential elections of Khyber Union on the ticket of the Pashtun Students Federation, of which he was a significant member.

== Political activism ==
Ali Khan Masood's political activism began early, influenced by his family's stories of resistance against British colonialism. His political engagement deepened when, in 1965, he witnessed the presidential election campaigns of Fatima Jinnah against General Ayub Khan. This exposure to political discourse and activism had a profound impact on him. In the late 1960s, Masood became an active member of the National Awami Party (NAP) and later joined the Awami National Party (ANP). Additionally, he was involved with the Pashtun Students Federation (PSF). He became a prominent figure in student politics, winning the presidential elections of Khyber Union on the PSF ticket. During this time, he worked closely with political figures like Afrasiab Khattak and Abdul Wali Khan.

In July 1974, due to his political activities, Masood was arrested by Zulfikar Ali Bhutto's government and detained in Peshawar and Haripur jails. He continued his studies from jail and passed his final LL.B exams.

After his release in May 1975, the government sought him again in the Hyderabad Conspiracy Case, but he evaded capture. In September 1975, Masood fled to Afghanistan via Miranshah and Khost, and made his way to Germany in April 1976.

== Work in Germany ==
In Germany, Mahsood remained politically active. He is joint founder the National Liberation Union of Pashtoons and Baluchs in Frankfurt am Main in June 1976. In 1981, he co-founded the Pashtoons Social Democratic Party (PSDP), where he was appointed as the Vice President.

After the sudden death of Kabir Stori on 4 April 2006, Masood became the acting president of the party. On 29 June 2010, he was elected as the President of the PSDP. The party gathers Pashtuns from both sides of the Durand Line.

== Published works ==
Ali Khan Masood is also a published author.

His notable works include:

1. "The Germans united once again" (جرمنیان بیا یو شول)
2. "From Pir Roshan to Bacha Khan" (له پیر روښانه تر باچا خان پورې)
3. "Political Efforts of Ajmal Khattak" (د اجمل خټک سیاسي هلې ځلې)
