= Pashtun colonization of northern Afghanistan =

Starting in the 1880s, various Pashtun-dominated governments of Afghanistan have pursued policies, called Pashtunization, aimed towards settling more ethnic Pashtuns in the northern region of Afghanistan, then known as Afghan Turkestan.

== Early colonization ==
British Army Colonel Charles Yate (pictured as a captain), a supporter of the Pashtun colonization of northern Afghanistan.

The ethnic Pashtun population in northern Afghanistan was almost nonexistent when Emir Abdur Rahman Khan came to power in 1880. Before the 1880s, they formed around 2 to 4% of the population. During his reign, Abdur Rahman Khan initiated a process of ethnic Pashtun settlement and colonization called Pashtunization in northern Afghanistan. These Pashtun colonization policies had three major purposes: to strengthen the Pashtun-dominated government's hold on the Persian-speaking people living in the northern territories, to allow Afghan governments to deport their opponents to the north (where they would be comparatively less able to cause trouble to the government), and to help supposedly economically develop northern Afghanistan.

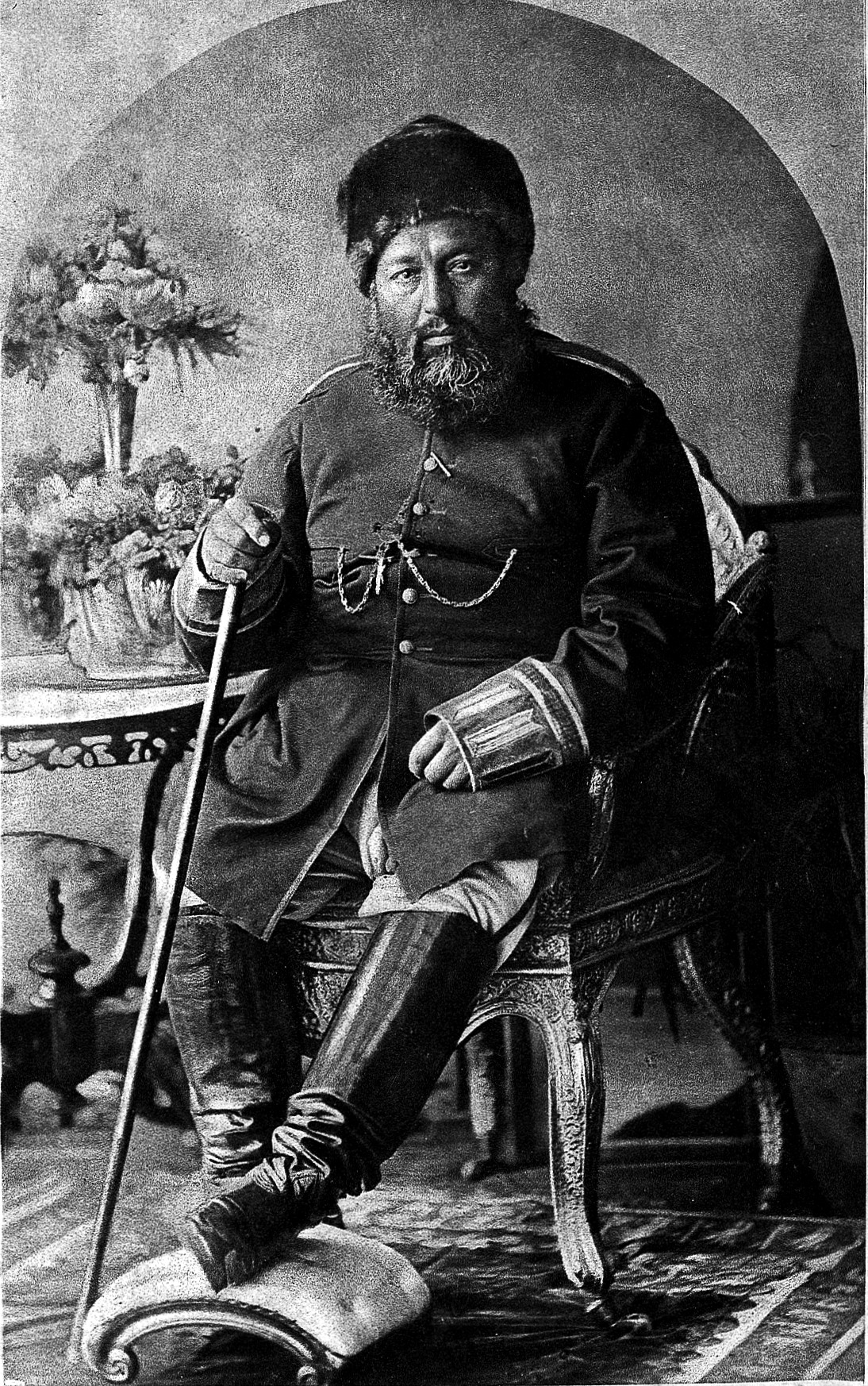
Abdur Rahman Khan, the Emir of Afghanistan (1880–1901).

Abdur Rahman himself stated that since the King of Afghanistan was Pashtun, Pashtuns should watch over the Afghan–Russian frontier. To achieve this goal, both Abdur Rahman Khan and his successors used land confiscation from the Persian-speaking non-Pashtun ethnic groups of northern Afghanistan, Pashtun nationalist ideology, pro-Pashtun forced resettlement, and taxation policies that were discriminatory against the many non-Pashtun tribes living in northern Afghanistan. The British Empire supported the Pashtun colonization of northern Afghanistan due to Britain's desire to reduce Russian influence in Afghanistan (see the Great Game). In 1893, British Army Major Charles Yate wrote that only the non-Pashtun tribes have any contact and interactions with the Russians, and that surrounding these tribes with Pashtuns would end these tribes' interactions with the Russians.

The Pashtun colonization of northern Afghanistan allowed Abdur Rahman Khan to strengthen his rule over the non-Pashtun lands in Afghan Turkestan. In addition to this, this Pashtun colonization resulted in Pashtun settlers acquiring the best land in northern Afghanistan at the expense of the Tajiks, Turkmens, Uzbeks, Hazaras, and other peoples who previously owned this land. While all of the Pashtuns who immigrated to northern Afghanistan before 1885 had done so involuntarily (often exiled for opposing the policies of the Afghan government), this changed after 1885, when Abdur Rahman began offering incentives for ethnic Pashtuns to voluntarily settle in northern Afghanistan (while also making this migration one-way by issuing a decree in 1885 which forbade any migration in the other direction). Ethnic Pashtuns who voluntarily migrated to northern Afghanistan often had their travel expenses paid for and were given animals, free land, and a three-year exemption from taxes. Abdur Rahman's policies of encouraging Pashtuns to settle in northern Afghanistan voluntarily ended up achieving more success than previous attempts at forced settlement (especially involuntary attempts which involved nomads). However, in spite of the incentive-based voluntary migration in force in 1885, many ethnic Pashtuns ended up being deported to northern Afghanistan even after 1885, in some cases as late as the 1940s. Between 1885 and 1888, the Pashtun population in northern Afghanistan had increased eight-fold from 3,500 Pashtun families in 1885 to 40,000 Pashtun families in 1888. Rebellions such as the Ghilzai Pashtuns' rebellions in eastern Afghanistan and Sardar Muhammad Ishaq's rebellion temporarily stopped Pashtun colonization of northern Afghanistan in the late 1880s. Afterwards, despite another short period of colonization, the Hazara War broke out in the early 1890s, ending the Pashtunization of northern Afghanistan during Abdur Rahman's reign – though it would resume under Abdur Rahman's successors after his death in 1901.

== Later colonization ==
Between the 1910s and the 1940s, many ethnic Pashtun herders settled in Afghan Turkestan. From the 1930s to the 1970s, after the ethnically Tajik Habibullāh Kalakāni attempted and failed to seize power in Afghanistan during the 1928–1929 civil war, ethnic Uzbeks and ethnic Tajiks lost hundreds of thousands of acres of pasture and cultivated land in northern Afghanistan. Afterwards, this land was sold or outright given to ethnic Pashtun settlers, further increasing Pashtun influence in northern Afghanistan. During this time, Pashtun settlers in Takhar Province pushed Tajik, Hazara, and Qarluq farmers as well as Uzbek herders out of irrigated lowlands and into foothills with little agricultural value. As a result of the 19th and 20th century Pashtun colonization policies that Afghan governments pursued, Pashtuns became the dominant ethnic group in the developed agricultural areas in northern Afghanistan, while other ethnic groups (especially the Uzbeks) came to dominate in the underdeveloped foothills. By the start of the 1970s, ethnic Pashtuns constituted 56% of the total population in the former Tajik-dominated Baghlan area, 61% of the total population in the Puli Khumri area (capital of Baghlan), 41% of the total population in the Tajik-plurality Kunduz area, 45% of the total population in the Khan Abad area, and just 10% of the total population in the Uzbek-majority Taloqan area.

== See also ==
- Anti-Afghan sentiment
- Anti-Pashtun sentiment
- Anti-Hazara sentiment
- Hazara nationalism
- Pashtunization
- Pashtun nationalism
- Ethnic violence in Afghanistan
- List of massacres in Afghanistan
- List of massacres against Hazaras
- Hazara genocide
