= Pashtun nationalism =

Assertion that Pashtuns are a nation and promotes the unity of Pashtuns

Flag of Pashtunistan

Pashtun nationalism (Pashto: پښتون ملتپالنه) is an ideology that asserts the Pashtuns are a nation and promotes the unity of Pashtuns. The Pashtun question, which is the debate over the creation of an independent Pashtun nation-state from the Pashtun-majority regions of Pakistan (Pakthunkhwa and Northern Balochistan), emerged in the early 20th century and became a major source of tension between Afghanistan and Pakistan. This issue dominated Afghan foreign policy until the overthrow of Mohammad Najibullah's Homeland Party regime in 1992. Pashtun nationalists generally support the concept of a "Greater Afghanistan" (The unification of Pashtunistan with Afghanistan).

== History ==
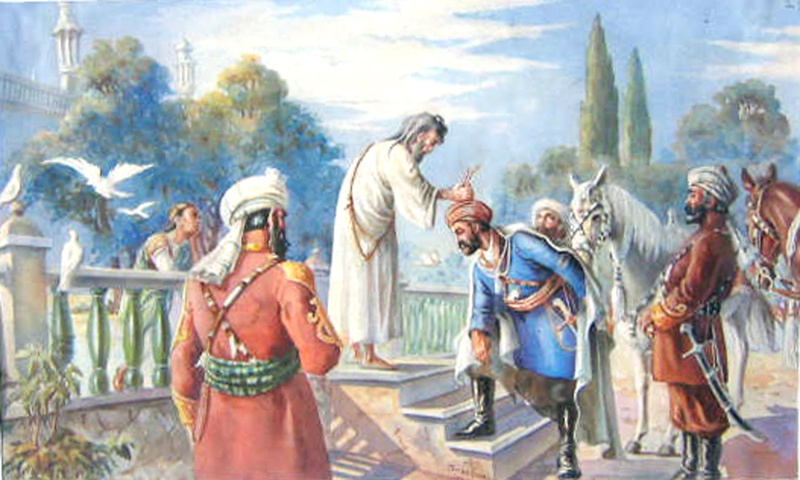
Painting by Abdul Ghafoor Breshna depicting the 1747 coronation of Ahmad Shah Durrani, who is regarded as the founding father of Afghanistan (Father of the Nation).

=== Pre-19th century ===
An early Pashtun nationalist was the 17th-century "warrior-poet" Khushal Khan Khattak, who was imprisoned by the Mughal emperor Aurangzeb for trying to incite the Pashtuns to rebel against the rule of the Mughals. However, despite sharing a common language and believing in a common ancestry, the Pashtuns first achieved unity in the 18th century after being under foreign rule for many centuries. The eastern parts of Pashtunistan was ruled by the Mughal Empire, while the western parts were ruled by the Persian Safavids as their easternmost provinces. During the early 18th century, Pashtun tribes led by Mirwais Hotak successfully revolted against the Safavids in the city of Kandahar. In a chain of events, he declared Loy Kandahar and other parts of what is now southern Afghanistan independent. By 1738 the Mughal Empire had been defeated and their capital sacked and looted by forces of a new Iranian ruler Nader Shah Afshar. Besides Persian, Turkmen, and Caucasian forces, Nader was also accompanied by the young Ahmad Shah Durrani and 4,000 well-trained Pashtun troops.

After the death of Nader Shah in 1747 and the disintegration of his massive empire, Ahmad Shah Durrani established Durrani Empire, which included most of present-day Afghanistan and Pakistan, among other regions. The famous couplet by Ahmad Shah Durrani describes the association the people have with the regional city of Kandahar:

Da Dilī takht zə hērawəma chē rāyād kṛəm, zəmā da ṣ̌hkuləi Paṣ̌htūnkhwā da ghrō sarūna.
Translation: "I forget the throne of Delhi when I recall, the mountain peaks of my beautiful Pashtunkhwa."

The last Afghan Empire was established in 1747 and united different tribes as well as many other ethnic groups.

=== 19th century ===
Parts of the Pashtunistan region around Peshawar was invaded by Ranjit Singh and his Punjabi army in the early part of the 19th century, but a few years later they were defeated by the British, which reached the Pashtunistan region from the east. In 1836 the Emir of Afghanistan, Dost Mohammad Khan proposed that the Indus river serve as the border between Afghanistan and India in exchange for the Emir renouncing his authority over Kashmir. The British however supported the Punjabis in Lahore and their claim over Peshawar which greatly offended the Emir of Afghanistan who had claims on the Pashtun city.

=== Early 20th century ===
Following First World War, King Amanullah Khan believing the British and Indian troops would be "too war-weary to resist" sent detachments of Afghan soldiers which were assisted by tribal formations, to what is now Khyber Pakhtunkhwa and Northern Baluchistan in an attempt to reclaim all Pashtun territory west of the Indus river which had been lost during the 1800s, sparking the Third Anglo-Afghan War. However the British were unnerved by King Amanullah's alliance with the new Bolshevik government in Moscow and were angry at King Amanullah's aggitation of nationalists within the defined borders of the Raj and conducted an aerial bombing campaign on Kabul. Many Pashtuns from the occupied territories such as Nisar Muhammad Esapzai enlisted in the Afghan Army and resisted the British in order to reunite with Afghanistan. While the war resulted in a diplomatic victory for King Amanullah gaining de jure control over its foreign affairs (despite no Afghan ruler abiding by the treaty with Afghanistan continuing to maintain relations with Britain's adversaries such as Germany and Russia), his initial goal of reuniting all Pashtuns was not met and as a result of the war the Afghan military began to be reformed and the Afghan Air Force was established in 1921 with Soviet assistance.

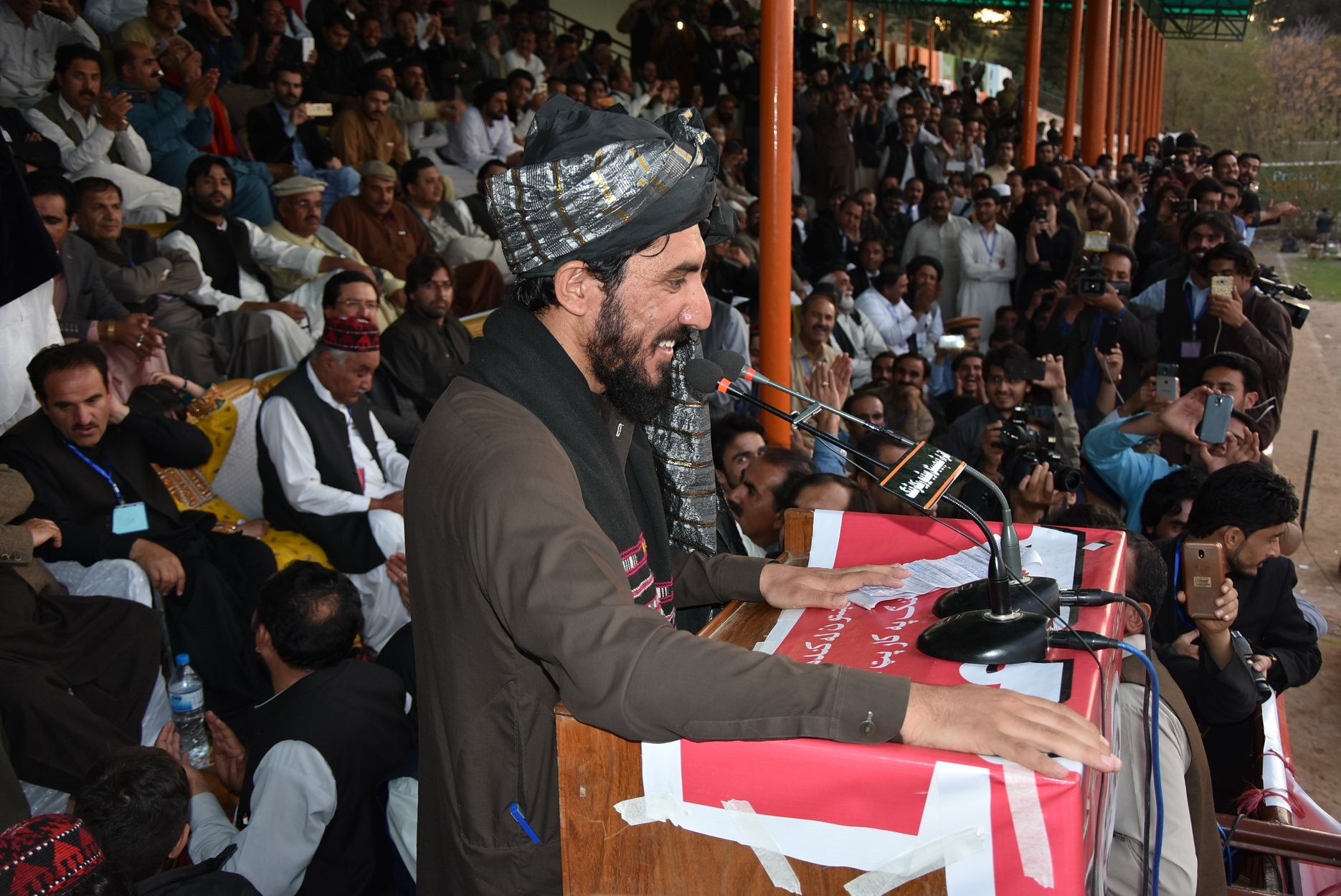
Manzoor Pashteen, Chairman of the Pashtun Tahafuz Movement ("Pashtun Protection Movement"), a social movement based in Khyber Pakhtunkhwa and Balochistan.

=== Opposition to Pakistan in 1947 to Republican Coup in 1973 ===
Seven weeks before the partition of British India, a Loya Jirga was held which included Bacha Khan, Abdul Samad Khan Achakzai, the Khudai Khidmatgars, members of the Provincial Assembly, Mirzali Khan (popularly known as the Faqir of Ipi), and various other Pashtun tribal leaders. The Pashtunistan Resolution, often referred to as the Bannu Resolution, was adopted on the 21 June 1947. The resolution demanded that Pashtuns be given the option to have an independent Pashtunistan consisting of all Pashtun territory in British India, rather than choosing to join the dominions of India or Pakistan. The British refused the demands which resulted in Pashtuns who were eligible to vote (Pashtuns in the Princely states were not eligible to vote) to boycott the referendum.

"That a free Pashtunistan of all Pashtuns be established. The Constitution of the State will be framed on the basis of Islamic conception, democracy, equality and social justice. This meeting appeals to all Pashtuns to unite for the attainment of this cherished goal and not to submit to any non-Pashtun domination".

General Mohammad Daoud Khan, acting without the authorization of Kabul, mobilized 6 well equipped Royal Afghan Army brigades at the border with the goal of crossing the border and initiating a Pashtun uprising in order to annex the Pashtun regions which were meant to go to Pakistan under the British partition plan by utilizing the chaos of the partition of British India. However General Daoud Khan was dismissed from his post and made ambassador to France. Afghanistan was the only country to vote against Pakistan's membership into the United Nations in 1947 in protest to the inclusion of Pashtun-inhabited lands, arguing that Pashtuns had the right to self determination. The currently-used red and black Pashtunistan flag was adopted with the black representing the traditional flag color of Afghanistan, and red representing the previous Pashtun rebel flags used against the British Empire. The Pashtunistan flag was raised in Kabul on 2 September 1947, alongside the Afghan flag.

After the establishment of Pakistan, Bacha Khan pledged his allegiance to the newly independent country in the Constituent Assembly of Pakistan, and said that he would continue to work for greater autonomy within the framework of the state of Pakistan. However, the Faqir of Ipi who had previously led numerous rebellions against the British, launched a rebellion against the newly formed Pakistani state in an effort to secede from Pakistan and form an independent Pashtunistan. The Faqir of Ipi took control of North Waziristan's Datta Khel area and declared the establishment of an independent Pashtunistan, supported by Afghan Prince Mohammad Daoud Khan and other leaders. The area was eventually re-annexed into Pakistan in the early 1950s. In 1949 the Royal Pakistani Air Force bombed the Afghan village of Mughalgai which prompted the Afghan national assembly to adopt a resolution repudiating all 19th century treaties signed between Afghanistan and British India on the grounds that the agreement signatory of British India no longer existed.

With the rise General Daoud Khan as prime minister in 1953, the Pashtunistan question became a major issue of Afghanistan's foreign and domestic politics. The dispute intensified in 1955 as Afghanistan opposed Pakistan's One Unit Scheme which merged North-West Frontier Province, Balochistan, Sindh and Punjab into one political unit known as West Pakistan, with Afghanistan and Pashtun nationalists viewing the scheme as a way to erode the Pashtun identity and challenge the administrative status of the tribal regions. As a result Pashtun nationalists attacked the Pakistani embassy in Kabul and consulates in Jalalabad and Kandahar, burning the Pakistani flag. Pakistan would block transit routes to Afghanistan as a result leading to Afghanistan to sign a transit treaty with the Soviet Union that same year. Afghanistan would hold a Loya Jirga in November 1955 which authorized the government to aggressively pursue the Pashtunistan issue and acquire modern weaponry and military hardware from any source possible. Three weeks after the Loya Jirga, Soviet Premier Niktia Khruschev visited Kabul from December 16th to December 18th. During the visit the Soviet leader endorsed Afghanistan's position on Pashtunistan.

Afghanistan would continue to give arms and supplies to Pashtun separatist leaders such as Fazl Akbar (also known as Pacha Gul) in Bajaur. In October 1961, Prime Minister Daoud Khan sent tribal militias and Royal Afghan Army soldiers to Bajaur to support the Pro-Afghan Pashtun tribal chiefs against the Pakistani backed Nawab of Khar. The clashes led to heavy casualties on both sides. As a result of the economic downturn because of the blockade imposed by Pakistan, Daoud Khan was asked to resign. Instead of resigning, Daoud Khan requested King Mohammed Zahir Shah to approve new 'one-party constitution' proposed by him which would in turn increase Daoud Khan's already considerable power. Upon rejection, Daoud Khan angrily resigned. During the so called "decade of democracy", Pashtun nationalist parties such as the Afghan Social Democratic Party (More commonly known as Afghan Mellat) were founded. The founder of Afghan Mellat was the former Mayor of Kabul, Ghulam Mohammad Farhad. Farhad had previously studied in Nazi Germany and was fascinated by aspects of Nazi policy. The Afghan Mellat Party favors the Pashtunization of Afghanistan and supports the concept of Greater Afghanistan. The Afghan Mellat party was accused by its critics of being fascist, a labelled denied by the party.

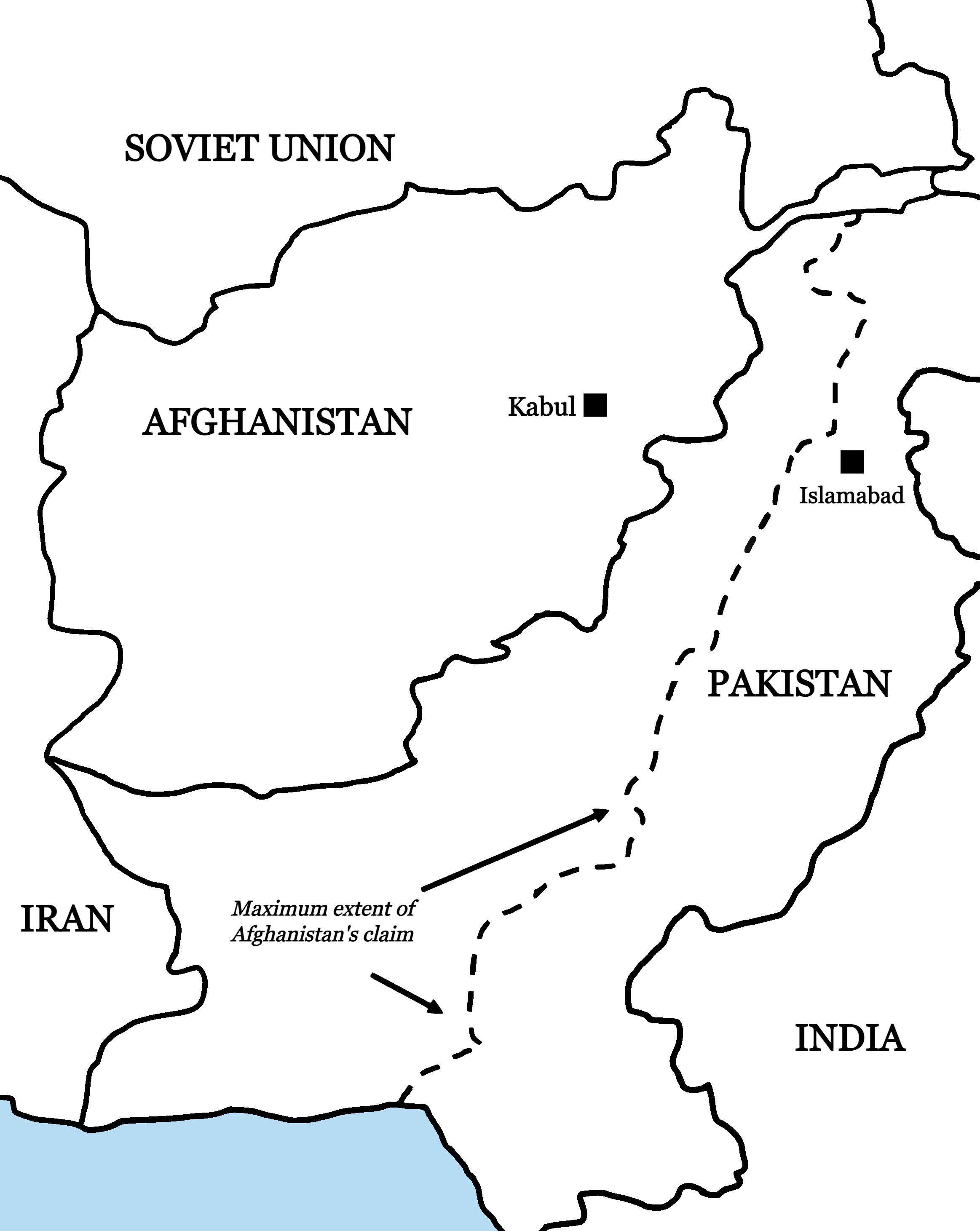
Afghanistan's territorial claims against Pakistan

=== Republican Era, 1973–1978 ===
Daoud Khan was unsatisfied with King Zahir Shah's constitutional parliamentary system and lack of progress. He planned rebellion for more than a year before he seized power from the King on 17 July 1973. The coup was bloodless, and backed by a large number of army officers who were loyal to him, facing no resistance he declared a Republic with himself as president.

Many Pashtuns opposed the premiership of Zulfiqar Ali Bhutto and what they viewed as anti Pashtun policies. As a result many young Pashtuns disillusioned with Bacha Khan's ideology of non violence decided to wage an armed campaign of terrorism against the Pakistani state with the separatist militant organization Pashtun Zalmay (Pashtun Youth) being founded in Peshawar in 1973. Pashtun Zalmay received support from the Afghan government between 1973 and 1976. In 1975 the governor of North-West Frontier Province, Hayat Sherapo was assassinated with the blame going to Pashtun Zalmay and Abdul Wali Khan. The Afghan government also created and armed tribal formations consisting of 3000 men to fight the Pakistani government. These formations were trained by the Afghan Republican Guard. In October 1977, the People's Democratic Party of Afghanistan's released a manifesto. Article 8 of the manifesto called the Durand Line a "colonial imposition" and pledged support for the "National Movement of the People of Pashtunistan".

=== Communist Era 1978–1992 ===
On April 28th 1978, the Saur Revolution brought the PDPA–Khalq to power with the new leader Nur Muhammad Taraki bringing up the issue of Pashtunistan during his first press conference on May 6, 1978. In May 1978, Pakistani President Zia Al Haq expressed his concerns to US President Jimmy Carter regarding the Khalq Regime's stance towards the Durand Line citing article 8 of the PDPA's manifesto. The new Khalqist leadership in Kabul continued to not recognize the Durand Line as the international border between Afghanistan and Pakistan, instead Taraki and Hafizullah Amin pushed for the idea of a Pashtun led, "Greater Afghanistan". Taraki would raise the idea of a Greater Afghanistan extending to the sea and training the army to act in this region, against Pakistan to Soviet Premier Leonid Brezhnev arguing that in doing so the Soviet Union could reach the Strait of Hormuz and gain access to the Indian Ocean through Afghanistan, and that the people of these regions viewed the predominately Punjabi Pakistan as "foreign", stating that

“We must not leave the Pashtun and Baluch (of Pakistan) in the hands of the imperialists, Already now it would be possible to launch a national liberation struggle amongst these tribes and include the Pashtun and Baluch regions in Afghanistan.”

In August 1978, Hafizullah Amin told Soviet Ambassador Alexander Puzanov and Soviet Major General L.N. Gorelov

“We are not parading the question of Pashtunistan and Baluchistan in the press although this question is still on the agenda. The territory of Afghanistan must reach to the shores of the Gulf of Oman and the Indian Ocean. We wish to see the sea with our own eyes.”

In December 1978, on a visit to Moscow, Soviet Premier Leonid Brezhnev attempted to talk to Taraki through Stanislav Gavrilov, the advisor of the Afghan Department of Foreign Affairs, who translated Brezhnev's words into Dari, however Taraki pretended not to understand what was being said. When negotiations began Taraki declared that

"We members of the delegation that have arrived in the friendly Soviet Union, are Afghans. To be more precise we are Pashtuns. This is why we would like Pashto to be used in this remarkable setting. As far as I know, your interpreters do not speak Pashto. This is why we have included a Pashtun officer in our delegation who has studied in your country and is fluent in Russian."

On the second day of the visit Hafizullah Amin brought up the issue of Pashtunistan to Aleksey Nikolayevich Kosygin, stating the history of Afghan territory was annexed by the British after the Second Anglo-Afghan war, leaving millions of Pashtuns outside of Afghanistan and under foreign rule. Amin claimed that if they did not act, the new Zia Ul Haq regime in Pakistan would send terrorists into Afghanistan. Taraki and Amin concluded that Zia's government was weak and that they could exploit the situation by arming the Pashtun and Baluch tribes. However to do so they needed financial support, arms, ammunition, transportation and communications equipment, with arguing that if the Soviets provided those, the Afghans themselves would assume responsibility for delivering material support to the Pashtun rebels. Kosygin concluded that Taraki's refusal to speak in Dari as a way to present himself as a "Pashtunist" and that the key topic of their visit to Moscow was Pashtunistan, with the Friendship Treaty serving as a formality. In 1979 under General Secretary Nur Muhammad Taraki the Khalqists regime in Afghanistan changed the official map to include NWFP and Balochistan as new "frontier provinces" of the DRA. In May 1979, Radio Afghanistan started created Anti-Pakistan songs with one song having the refrain "We shall march against Pakistan." while another song contained the lyrics "everyone who wishes to create division between the muslim khalqa of Afghanistan and Pakistan will be annihilated", "why are these black deeds being done against us from pakistan?", "our soldiers will fight if they are attacked", "the dal-aw-chapatis (a pejorative term used by Pashtuns for a Punjabi, who are the ethnic majority of Pakistan) and the lunatics cannot harm us." While addressing tribal leaders on 29th July 1979, Amin declared that

"All nationalities from the Oxus to the Abasin are brothers from one homeland. The waves of bravery of the Pashtuns and Baluchis of the whole region is reflected in the revolutionary emotions of the toilers here... our revolution is revered and welcomed from the Oxus to the Abasin... from the mountains of the Pamirs to the beaches of Gwadar in Baluchistan"

In October 1979, Hafizullah Amin who was now the leader of Afghanistan brought up the issue of Greater Afghanistan again saying

“Our task is to direct the officers and soldiers and all the Afghan people to the Durand line which we do not recognize, and then to the valley of the Indus which must be our border. If we do not fulfill this historic task, then one can say that we have been working in vain. We must have an outlet to the Indian Ocean!”

The Khalqist regime also sought to make Pashto the main language of the Afghan government, as it represented the clear majority, and in their view should serve as the lingua franca. In February 1981, the Pashtun Social Democratic Party (PSDP) was formed by Kabir Stori Esapzai. The PSDP rejects the legitimacy of the Durand Line and supports the concept of Greater Afghanistan. The PSDP logo consists of the Pashtunistan emblem. In 1987, Mohammad Najibullah became the President of Afghanistan. A Soviet GRU dossier on Najibullah described him as "A Pashtun nationalist, he is one of the motivating spirits of the policy of “Pashtunization” of Afghan society. Within his closest circle he speaks only in Pashto. He is inclined to select colleagues not for their professional qualities but for their personal devotion to him, predominantly relatives and fellow-villagers". Up until the overthrow of Dr Najibullah's Homeland Party regime in 1992, Afghan governments had heavily promoted the Pashto language in media with over 50% of Afghan media being in Pashto. After 1992 with the formation of the Tajik led Islamic State of Afghanistan, this number dropped drastically.

=== From 1992 to the present ===
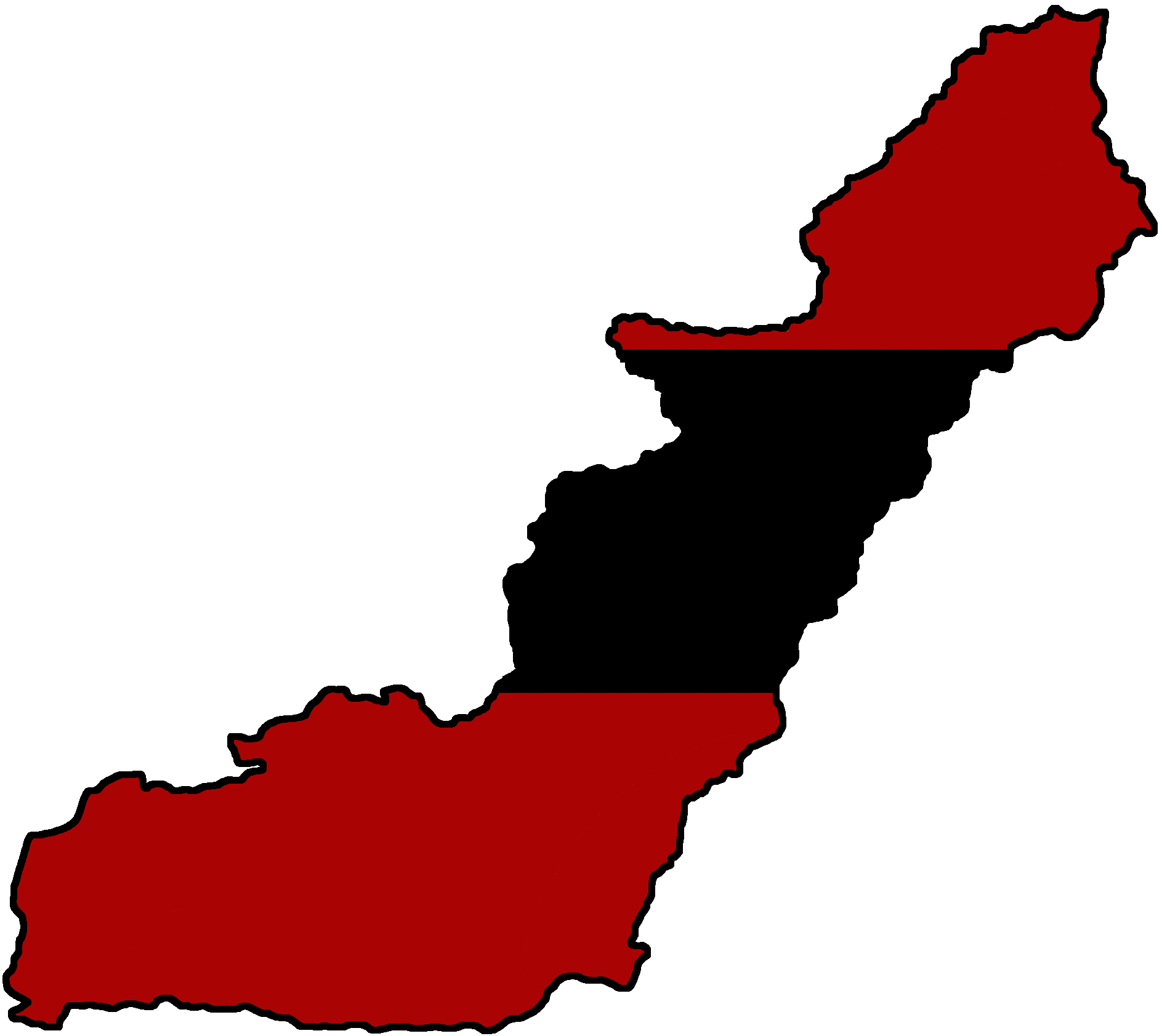
Proposed borders of Pashtunistan, stretching from Dir in the north to Quetta in the south

In 2014 the Pashtun Protection Movement (PTM) was founded by eight students. The organization and its leader Chairman Manzoor Pashteen have been accused by the Pakistani government of separatist tendencies, being funded by Afghanistan's NDS and having ties to the Taliban. In 2024, Gilaman Wazir, a member of PTM who fierce advocate of the concept of Greater Afghanistan was arrested by Bahraini Security Forces on an Interpol 'Red Notice' issued at Pakistan's request. On March 8, Bahraini authorities extradited Gilaman to Pakistan, where he was immediately detained and subjected to severe hard torture. On July 7, 2024, Gilaman was attacked in Islamabad, reportedly under orders from the Pakistani government due to the perceived threat he posed to the state of Pakistan. The severity of his injuries were fatal and he was buried wrapped in the Afghan Tricolor flag in accordance to his wishes with tens of thousands showing up for his funeral in North Waziristan. His assassination sparked mass anger in Afghanistan, Pakhtunkhwa and among the Pashtun diaspora with the hashtag #GilamanWazir trending widely despite a media blackout in Pakistan. Protests were held worldwide, including in the United States, the United Kingdom, Germany, France, and Austria.

== Symbols ==
Pashtunistan
- Use: Regional and cultural
- Proportion: 1:2
- Adopted: 2 September 1947; 79 years ago
- Design: A red field with a black stripe 1/5 wide, 1/5 away from the hoist and with an image of the sun rising over the mountains.

The flag of Pashtunistan (Pashto: د پښتونستان بیرغ) is a flag representing a proposed independent state of Pashtunistan. The flag was adopted by Pashtun separatists who sought to carve out an independent state of Pashtunistan from Pakistan's North-West Frontier Province, Balochistan and the Federally Administered Tribal Areas. The flag was promoted by the Afghan government which supported the separatist cause, with August 31 (9th of Waǵay in the Solar Hijri calendar) being Pashtunistan Day which was observed as a national holiday in Afghanistan until the overthrow of Mohammad Najibullah's Homeland Party regime in 1992. The flag is still in use today by Pashtun nationalists.

The flag was adopted on September 2, 1947, at the declaration of independence, following the boycott by Pashtuns on the referendum on joining Pakistan as the referendum did not include an option to form an independent Pashtunistan as demanded by the Pashtunistan Resolution. The flag was promoted by the Pashtun nationalist governments of Afghanistan which supported the separatist cause, with September 2 being becoming Pashtunistan Day and would remain a national holiday in Afghanistan from 1949 up until the overthrow of Mohammad Najibullah's Homeland Party regime in 1992 which ended Pashtun domination in Afghan politics. In 1955 Pakistan announced it was consolidating its control over the Pashtun areas of Pakistan via the One-Unit Scheme which caused outrage in Afghanistan. Afghan Prime Minister Daoud Khan heavily criticized the act on Radio Kabul on March 29, 1955. Inspired by the Afghan government's messaging, Pashtun nationalists attacked the Pakistani embassy in Kabul tearing down the Pakistani flag and putting the Pashtunistan flag up in its place with Kabul Police refusing to act against the protestors. This resulted in both countries withdrawing ambassadors and not restoring full relations until 1957. It was widely used in Afghanistan until the fall of the Homeland Party government in 1992. From the 1940s to the 1980s it appeared on Afghan postage stamps. The flag made a resurgence in the early 2000s thanks to the internet and is widely used today by Pashtun nationalists but its sometimes also used when referring to the Pashtun ethnic group.

The colors of the Pashtunistan flag derive from both "racial and religious traditions" as well as the Pashtun people's struggle for freedom. The red is meant to honour the martyrs who sacrificed their blood for Pashtun freedom. The flag used by the Khudai Khidmatgars which was a Pashtun resistance movement against the British, was a unicolor red and this same flag was later adopted by the National Councils of Pashtunistan with some modifications. The black stripe is to represent the Black flag used in the early Islamic era which also was used as Afghanistan's flag up until 1901 when an emblem was added to it. The red and black are also to represent the predominant colors in "the life of the Afghan race" and the traditional clothing of Pashtuns in both Pashtunistan and Afghanistan composed of these colors. Iranic tradition considers red as a sign of valour and black signifies perseverance and strength. The Emblem in the center of the Black stripe depicts the sun of freedom (Which is also referenced in the anthem of the Democratic Republic of Afghanistan) rising over snowy peaks with the takbir written above the emblem.

=== Color scheme of the flag of Pashtunistan ===
Color Model	Red	Black	White	Blue	Yellow	Green
CMYK	0.98.98.34	0.0.0.100	0.0.0.0	72.21.0.16	0.25.100.4	91.0.64.44
RGB	(169,4,3)	(0,0,0)	(255,255,255)	(60,169,214)	(245,184,0)	(13,143,52)
HTML	#a90403	#000000	#FFFFFF	#3ca9d6	#f5b800	#0d8f34

=== Related flags ===
Other flags used over time are:

Flag	Date	Use	Details
	1709–1738 1818–1901	Flag of the Hotak Empire (1709–1738) Flag of the Emirate of Afghanistan (1818–1901)	
	Late 1800s	Flag of Waziri Rebels	
	1928	Afghan Tricolor, originally designed in 1928 under King Amanullah Khan, served as the basis for the flags of the Kingdom of Afghanistan, the First Republic of Afghanistan, the Democratic Republic of Afghanistan, the Second Republic of Afghanistan, and the Islamic Republic of Afghanistan	
	1928	Flag of Afghanistan	
	1928–1929	Flag of Afghanistan	
	1930s	Flag of Pashtun rebels	
	1940s	Flag of Pashtunistan	Before September 2, 1947
	c. 1987–present	Flag of Pashtunistan	Known as the red-black-red flag

=== Stamps and maps ===
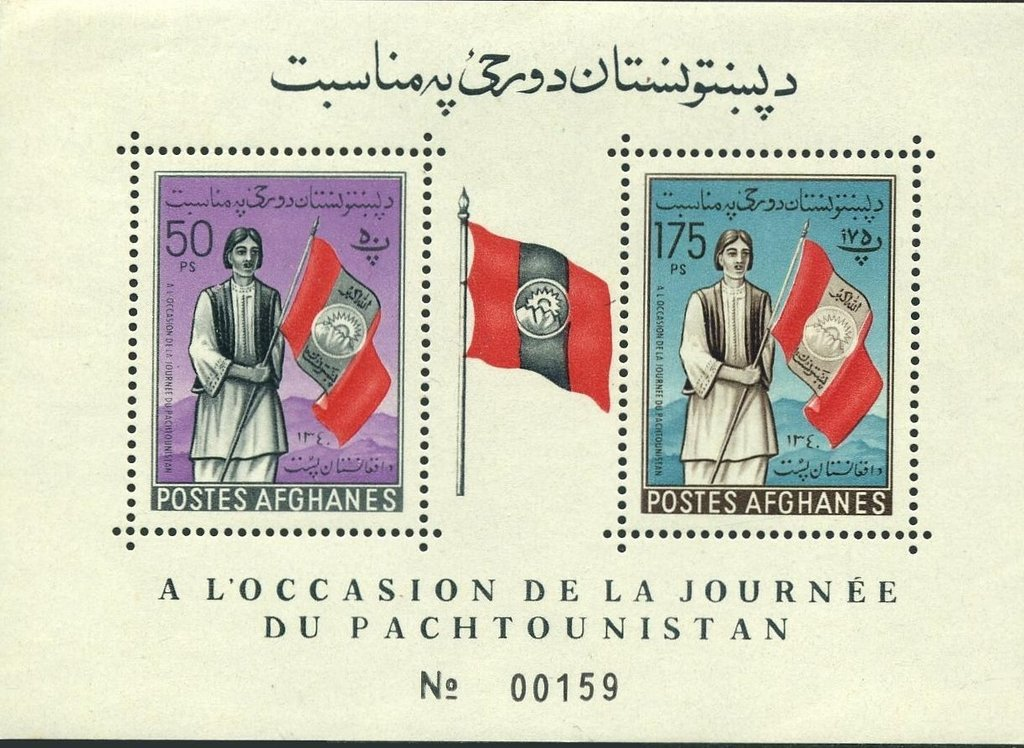
1961 Stamp commemorating "Pashtunistan Day"

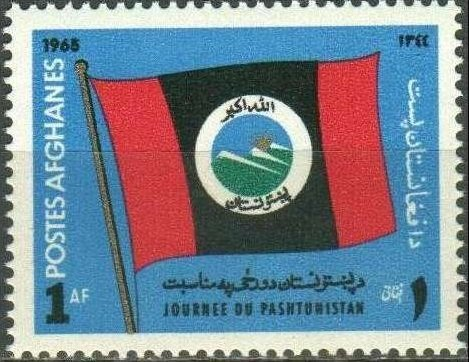
1965 Stamp with alternative variant

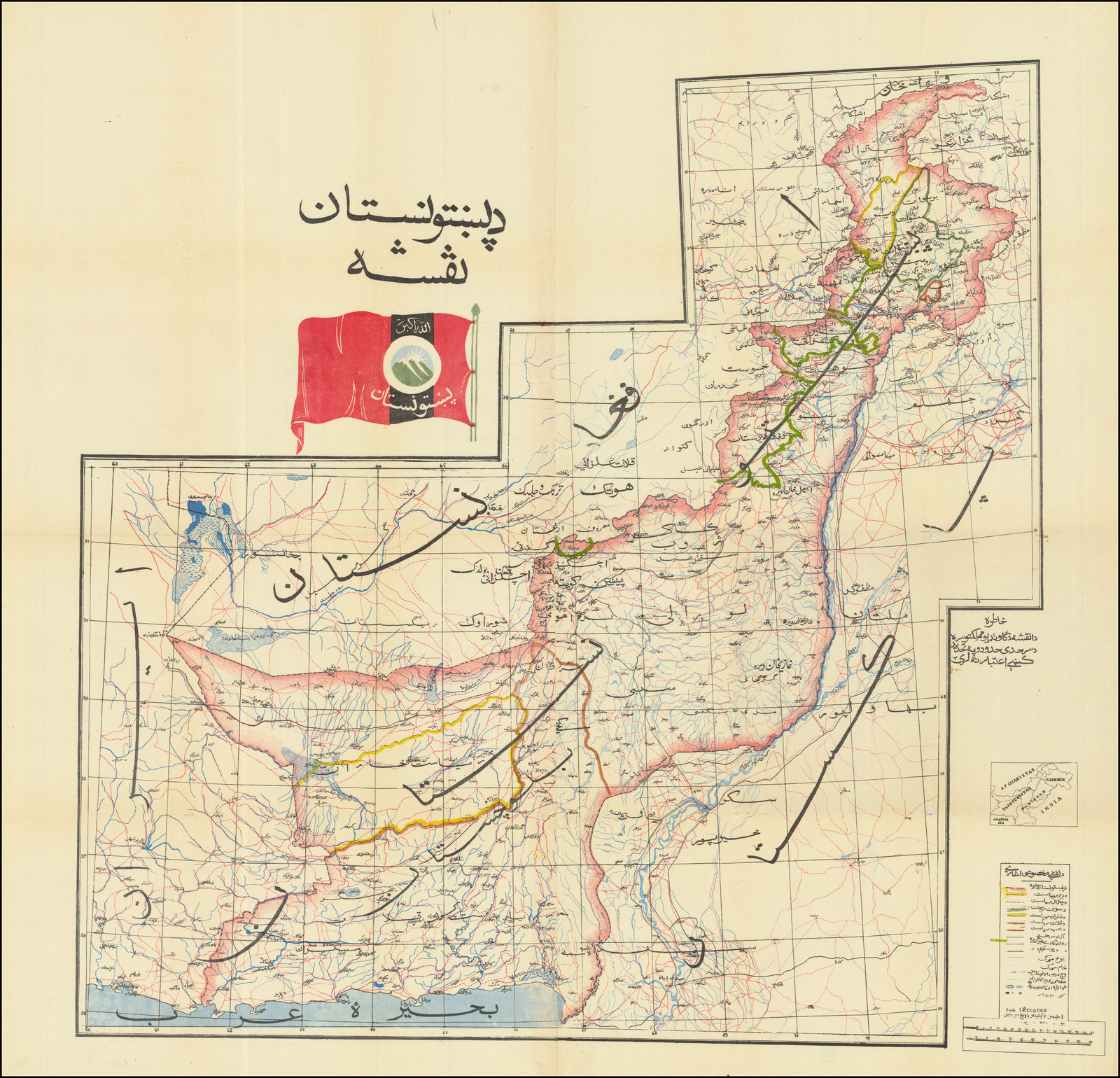
Map of Pashtunistan published in 1953

== Nationalist political parties ==
=== Current ===
==== In Afghanistan ====
- Afghan Mellat Party (1966–present)
- Pashtun Social Democratic Party (1981–present)
- Taliban (Factions) (1994–present)

==== In Pakistan ====
- Pashtun Protection Movement
- Taliban (Factions) (2007–present)
- Afghan Mellat Party (1966–present)
- Pashtun Social Democratic Party (1981–present)
- Pashtunkhwa National People's Party (PKMAP) (1989–present)
- Pashtunkhwa National People's Party (PKNAP) (2022–present)
- National Democratic Movement (2021–present)

=== Defunct ===
==== In Afghanistan ====
- National Revolutionary Party of Afghanistan (1974–1978)
- People's Democratic Party of Afghanistan - Khalq Faction (1965–1990)
- Awakened Youth (1947–1951)

==== In Pakistan ====
- Khudai Khidmatgar (1929–1947)
- Pashtun Brotherhood (1954–1957)
- Pashtun Zalmay (1973–1977)
- National People's Party – Pashtunkhwa (1970–1989)

== Personalities ==
- Daoud Khan
- Manzoor Pashteen
- Gilaman Wazir
- Abdul Rauf Benawa
- Ghulam Mohammad Farhad
- Shams-ul-Huda Shams
- Abdul Ghaffar Khan
- Abdul Ghani Khan
- Sher Mohammad Abbas Stanikzai
- Mohammad Gul Khan Momand
- Mohammad Yaqoob Mujahid
- Mirza Ali Khan Wazir
- Mahmud Tarzi
- Kabir Stori Esapzai
- Ali Khan Maseed
- Mohammad Gul Khan Momand
- Mahmood Khan Achakzai
- Abdul Samad Khan Achakzai
- General Abdul Raziq Achakzai
- Nur Muhammad Taraki
- Hafizullah Amin
- Mohammad Najibullah
- Shahnawaz Tanai
- Ajmal Khattak
- Zahir Shah

== See also ==
- Pashtunistan
- Pashtunization
- Pashtunistan independence movement
- Pashtun question
- Greater Afghanistan
- Durand Line
- Bannu Resolution
- Mullah Powindah
- Sartor Faqir
- Umra Khan
- Pashtun colonization of northern Afghanistan
