= Pashtoons Social Democratic Party =

Political party in Afghanistan

Pashtoons Social Democratic Party د پښتنو ټولنیز ولسولیز ګوند (Pashto)
- Abbreviation: PSDP
- Chairperson: Ali Khan Masood
- Founder: Kabir Stori
- Founded: February 1981
- Ideology: Pashtun nationalism Greater Afghanistan

Website
- pashtoonkhwa.com

The Pashtoons Social Democratic Party (PSDP; Pashto: د پښتنو ټولنیز ولسولیز ګوند) is a Pashtun nationalist political party in Afghanistan and Pakistan. Oriented towards the principles of European social democracy, the party is currently led by Ali Khan Masood.

== History ==
The Pashtun Social Democratic Party was founded in February 1981 by Kabir Stori who had previously served as a founder of the National Liberation Union of Pashtuns and Balochs. Kabir was an Afghan scholar from the Pashtun Yusafzai tribe. He was educated in Germany and originally from Kunar province in Afghanistan.

The Pashtun Social Democratic Party was offered a position in Mohammad Najibullah's Homeland Party government following a meeting among Stori, Ali Khan Masood and President Najibullah.

Since April 4, 2006, Masood has been the incumbent chairperson of PSDP.

The party does not recognize the legitimacy of the Durand Line, which splits the Pashtun people between Afghanistan and Pakistan, and instead supports the concept of Greater Afghanistan.

== See also ==
- Pashtun nationalism
- Pashtunistan independence movement
- Greater Afghanistan
