= Shahmahmood Miakhel =

Politician

- شاه محمود میاخېل
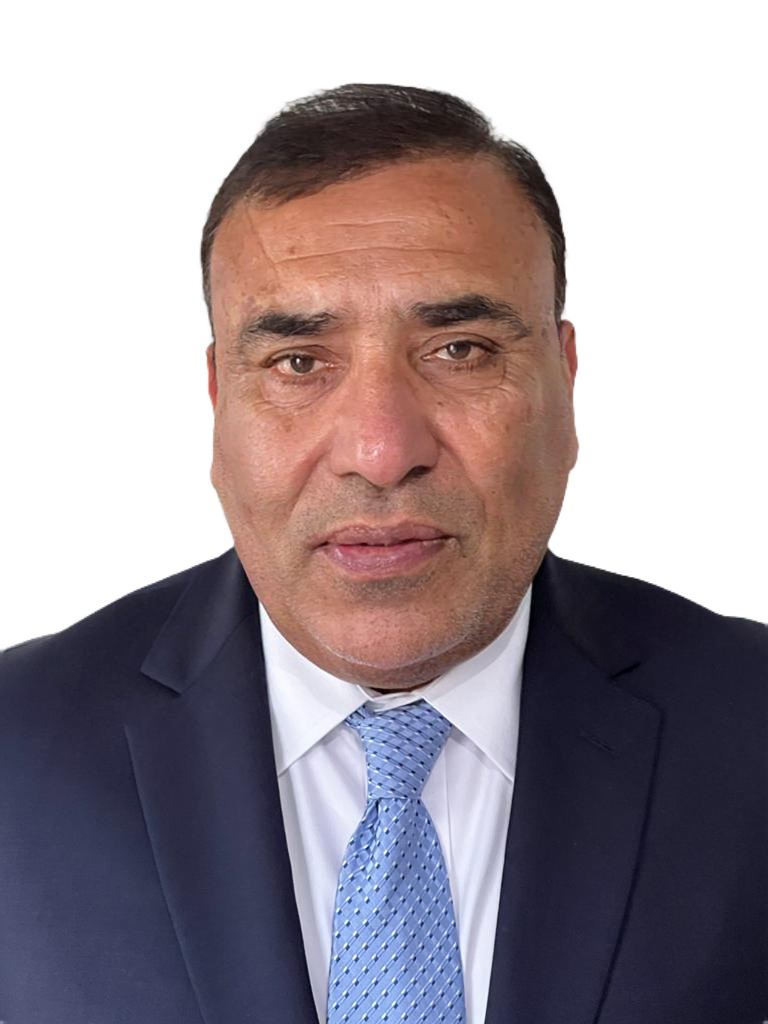

First Deputy/Acting Defense Minister
- Acting
- In office July 2020 – March 2021
- President: Ashraf Ghani
- Succeeded by: Mohammad Fazl

Nangarhar
- Gouverneur
- In office February 2019 – July 2020
- President: Ashraf Ghani
- Preceded by: Hayatullah Hayat
- Succeeded by: Zia-Ul Haq Amarkhil

Ministry of Interior Affairs (Afghanistan)
- Deputy Minister of Interior
- In office 28 January 2003 – 27 September 2005
- President: Hamid Karzai
- Minister: Ali Jalali

Personal details
- Born: Kunar, Afghanistan
- Citizenship: US citizen
- Children: 7
- Awards: Wazir Akbar Khan medal

Shahmahmood Miakhel (also spelled Shah Mahmood Miakhel; *01.05.1958 in Kunar, Afghanistan) (Pashto: شاه محمود میاخېل) is an Afghan politician.

He was appointed Afghanistan's ambassador to Qatar before the Taliban overthrew the government. During the Islamic Republic Government, he was considered one of the most influential politicians.

== Life ==
Miakhel has an MA in Political Science and an EMBA. He also completed a fellowship program at Stanford University on democracy, development and the rule of law and leadership program at Harvard Kennedy School of Government. Miakhel worked with NGOs, USIP and UN. He worked as a reporter for The Voice of America in 80s. Mr. Miakhel published several books in the Pashto language, and many of his articles were published in various international media outlets.

== Political career ==
From 2005 to 2009, he was governance advisor/head of the governance unit of the United Nations Assistance Mission in Afghanistan (UNAMA).

Miakhel first gained reputation as Deputy Minister for the Ministry of Interior from 2003 to 2005. From September 2009 to February 2019, he served as Country Director at the United States Institute of Peace. He gained a high profile and popularity especially among the population through the confidence of former Afghan President Ashraf Ghani, who appointed him as governor of Nangarhar.

Also during his time in Nangarhar, he succeeded in becoming the first governor in history to ban and sanction foreign currencies. He banned the circulation of Pakistani rupees in Nangarhar after they had been used as Afghan currency in the local market for four decades. Since December 12, 2019, it was forbidden to pay with Rupee or other to pay foreign currencies. During his tenure as Governor of Nangarhar Province, ISI-K was defeated and Nangarhar become a safer province.According to Afghan statistics, at the time, Nangarhar province was safer than it had ever been. After his voluntary resignation, he was tagged as deputy defense minister. Due to a prolonged illness of the Defense Minister Asadullah Khalid, Shahmahmood Miakhel became acting Minister of Defense. He served from March 11, 2021, to June 25, 2021, and resigned due to internal issues. Miakhel was to be sent to Qatar as ambassador to also participate in the Taliban peace talks.

== Private life ==
Miakhel is married with seven (4 boys and 3 girls) children. All of his children educated and settled in the US. Miakhel is known for engaging with citizens and critics on social media like Facebook on a daily basis and fighting corruption. He advocates for human rights and specially women's rights. and is an opponent of the current Afghan Taliban government. He has survived several attacks.
