= Ministry of Urban Development and Housing (Afghanistan) =

Government ministry of Afghanistan

- Ministry flag

Agency overview
- Formed: 1961
- Preceding agencies: General Department of Urban Development; General Directorate of Urban Development and Housing
- Jurisdiction: Afghanistan
- Headquarters: Kabul, Afghanistan
- Agency executive: Hamdullah Nomani, Acting Minister
- Website: Official Website

The Ministry of Urban Development and Housing (MUDH) is an Afghan government agency that was established in 1961 under the framework of the Ministry of Public Works. MUDH is responsible for guiding and formulating urban policies, supporting municipalities, developing urban master plans, and maintaining and managing housing.

== History ==
It was initially named the General Department of Urban Development and was later upgraded to the General Directorate of Urban Development and Housing in 1966. Over the years, it underwent several changes and in 1993 it was renamed the Ministry of Urban Development and Housing. In 2007, the ministry was transferred to the Ministry of Urban Development, and in 2018, it was renamed the Ministry of Urban Development and Housing. Afghanistan Land Authority (ARAZI) was merged with MUDH in 2016 based on a presidential decree. The purpose of this merger was to reform the administrative system and provide better services to the people.

== Achievements ==
The Ministry has started the implementation of 790 construction and infrastructure projects across the country.

In April 2023, in terms of revenue, MUDH collected 530 million AFG in one year, which represents an 87% increase compared to previous years.

== Former Ministers ==
- Yousef Pashtun (2004-2009)
- Sultan Hussein rejected by Parliament, served as acting Minister (2010-2012)
- Dr. Hassan Abdulhai Minister of Urban Development (2012035, 20130531 - 20140930 )
- Dr. Hassan Abdulhai Acting Minister of Urban Development (20141001)
- acting Minister of Urban Development Hamed Jalil (20141209)
- Sadat Mansoor Naderi (20150418, 20161114) stepped down (20180612)
- Roshan Walusman introduced as the acting minister of urban development and housing (20180613)
- Mohammad Jawad Paikar (2018114) acting
- Mahmood Karzai (20200602) nominated and acting. Confirmed (20201130)
- Hamdullah Nomani (20210709)

Construction affairs deputy minister:

- Sayed Nasir Khaliq 820180613)

Housing affairs deputy minister:

- Aziz Ahmad Gulistani (20180613)

Urban affairs deputy besides serving as acting minister:

- Roshan Walusmal (20180613)

Enterprises affairs deputy minister:

- Humayoun Faiz (20180613)

Deputy Minister of Finance and Administrative affairs:

- Mrs. Khatira Sadaat Katira Sadaat (20200629)

Afghanistan's Land Authority merging with MUDH.(20181115)
