= Revolutionary Toilers Society of Afghanistan =

Revolutionary Toilers Society of Afghanistan (Dari: جماعت انقلابی زحمتکشان افغانستان, abbreviated جازا, Jam'iat-e Inqilabi-ye Zahmatkashan-e Afghanistan, 'JAZA') was a political organization in Afghanistan, a dissident faction of the People's Democratic Party of Afghanistan. JAZA was led by Kandahari Zaher Ufoq. The group criticized the PDPA from a leftist position, for example for not having declared dictatorship of the proletariat following the Saur Revolution.

The organisation later split with youth cadres forming the Organisation of Toilers' Fedayan of Afghanistan advocating the continuation of armed struggle.
