= Khas Kunar District =

District in Kunar Province, Afghanistan

Khas Kunar District خاص کونړ ولسوالۍ
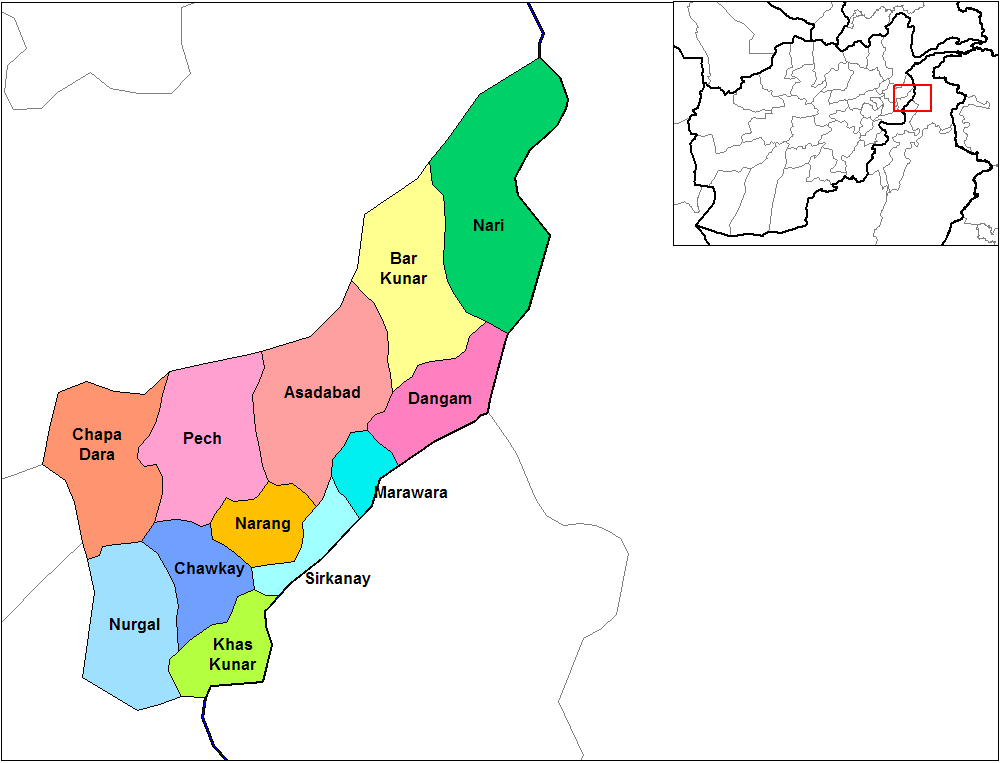
- Khas Kunar District in light green color in the southeast

- Location in Afghanistan
- Country: Afghanistan
- Province: Kunar
- Capital: Khas Kunar

Government
  - Type: District
- Elevation: 749 m (2,457 ft)

Population (2002)
  - Total: 29,836
- Time zone: UTC+04:30 (Afghanistan Time)
- Main languages: Pashto

Khas Kunar District ( Pashto: خاص کونړ ولسوالۍ) is one of about 16 districts of Kunar Province in Afghanistan. It is situated in the southeastern part of the province and borders Nangarhar Province to the south and Khyber Pakhtunkhwa to the east. The Kunar River passes north through the district and irrigates the surrounding land. The population of Khas Kunar was estimated to be around 29,836 people in 2002. The village of Khas Kunar serves as the district center, which is located at an altitude of 749 m (2,457 ft).

== Villages of Khas Kunar ==
1. Ahingrano Kalai (اهینګرانو کلی)
2. Araz (ارازۍ)
3. Bandaei (بانډه)
4. Bara Arazi (بره ارازۍ)
5. Barabad (باراباد)
6. Bar Saray (بر سری)
7. Bilam (بیلام)
8. Camp (کیمپ)
9. Chanch (چنچ)
10. Chara Gai
11. Chemyari (چیماری)
12. Dag Kalai (ډاک کلی)
13. Hakimabad (حکیم اباد)
14. Koligram (کولیګرام)
15. Kadro Kalai (کنډرو غاړه)
16. Khyber Khowar (خیبر خوړ)
17. Kotkai (کوټکی)
18. Khas Kunar (خاص کونړ)
19. Lottan (لوټان)
20. Loy Kalai (لوی کلی)
21. Malkano Banda (ملکانو بانډه)
22. Mangwal (منګوال)
23. Miagano Kalai (میاګانو کلی)
24. Sahibjam Kalai (صاحب جم کلی)
25. Sahibzad Gano Kalai (صحابزاده ګانو کلی)
26. Saray (سری)
27. Shalai (شالۍ)
28. Shankar (شامکار)
29. Shikhano Banda (شیخانو بانډه)
30. Tannar (تنر)
31. Telay Banda (طلایی بانډې)
32. Wolaei (ولۍ)
33. Zargaran (زرګران)
34. Zor Kunar (زوړ کونړ)

== See also ==
- Districts of Afghanistan
