= Pashtun question =

Controversy in Afghan politics

The "Pashtun question", sometimes referred to as the "Pashtunistan question", was the issue in Afghan politics regarding the demand by Afghanistan and Pashtun nationalists for the creation of an independent Pashtunistan comprising Pakistan's North-West Frontier Province (NWFP), the Federally Administered Tribal Areas (FATA), Balochistan and both the North-West Frontier Province and the Provincially Administered Tribal Areas (PATA).

The issue dominated Afghanistan's foreign policy regarding Pakistan up until the overthrow of President Mohammad Najibullah’s government in 1992.

== History ==
=== 1878–1947 ===
Following Afghanistan's defeat in the Second Anglo-Afghan War, the Durand Line was drawn by British diplomat Mortimer Durand as the border between the Emirate of Afghanistan and the British Raj in 1893, However, the border split the ethnic Pashtuns who made up the majority of Afghanistan and its ruling class. From 1893–1947, there were various Afghan uprisings against British rule in the Pashtun regions east of the Durand Line. The first ever counterinsurgency air campaign took place between 1919 and 1925 against Pashtun rebels.

=== 1947–present ===
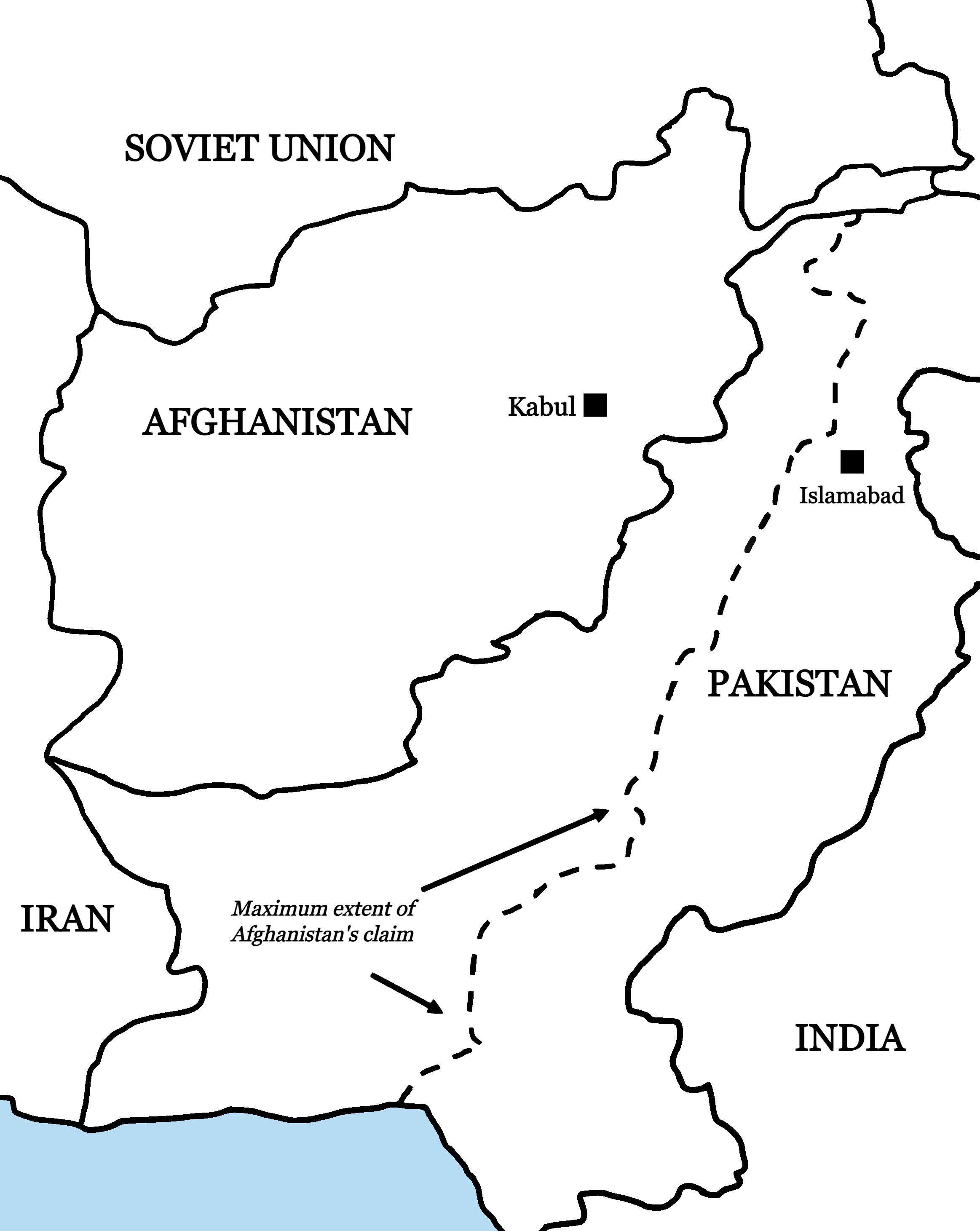
Afghanistan's territorial claims against Pakistan

Seven weeks before the partition of British India, a Loya Jirga was held which included Bacha Khan, Abdul Samad Khan Achakzai, the Khudai Khidmatgars, members of the Provincial Assembly, Mirzali Khan (popularly known as the Faqir of Ipi), and various other Pashtun tribal leaders. The Pashtunistan Resolution, often referred to as the Bannu Resolution, was adopted on the 21 June 1947. The resolution demanded that Pashtuns be given the option to have an independent Pashtunistan consisting of all Pashtun territory in British India, rather than choosing to join the dominions of India or Pakistan. The British refused the demands which resulted in Pashtuns who were eligible to vote (Pashtuns in the Princely states were not eligible to vote) to boycott the referendum.

"That a free Pashtunistan of all Pashtuns be established. The Constitution of the State will be framed on the basis of Islamic conception, democracy, equality and social justice. This meeting appeals to all Pashtuns to unite for the attainment of this cherished goal and not to submit to any non-Pashtun domination".

Afghanistan was the only country to vote against Pakistan's membership into the United Nations in 1947 in protest to the inclusion of Pashtun-inhabited lands, arguing that Pashtuns had the right to self determination. The currently-used red and black Pashtunistan flag was adopted with the black representing the traditional flag color of Afghanistan, and red representing the previous Pashtun rebel flags used against the British Empire. The Pashtunistan flag was raised in Kabul on 2 September 1947, alongside the Afghan flag.

The current flag of Pashtunistan adopted on 2 September 1947

In 1948, the Faqir of Ipi who had previously led numerous rebellions against the British, launched a rebellion against the newly formed Pakistani state in an effort to secede from Pakistan and form an independent Pashtunistan. The Faqir of Ipi took control of North Waziristan's Datta Khel area and declared the establishment of an independent Pashtunistan, supported by Afghan Prince Mohammad Daoud Khan and other leaders. The area was eventually re-annexed into Pakistan.

== See also ==
- Pashtuns
- Pashtunistan independence movement
- Pashtun nationalism
- Pashtunistan
- Greater Afghanistan
- Khyber Pakhtunkhwa
- Faqir of Ipi
- 1949 Mughalgai raid
- Bajaur Campaign
