= Ghulam Mohammad Farhad =

- غلام محمد فرهاد

Mayor of Kabul
- In office 1948–1954

Personal details
- Born: 1901 Maidan Wardak, Emirate of Afghanistan
- Died: 7 November 1984 (82–83 years) Kabul, Democratic Republic of Afghanistan
- Party: Afghan Millat Party
- Education: Technical University of Munich
- Occupation: Politician, engineer

Ghulam Mohammad Farhad (1901–1984) was an Afghan engineer He lived in Germany on a royal scholarship from 1921 to 1928, training as an electrician at the Technical University of Munich. During his studies in Germany, he came in contact with Nazi policy and became fascinated by some aspects of it. After he returned to Afghanistan, Farhad was appointed to several electricity-related posts in the government, finally serving as president of the Kabul Electric Company from 1939 to 1966. He traveled to Germany in 1947 to acquire equipment; he was often accused of favoring German-manufactured products.

From 1948 to 1954, he was mayor of Kabul. He notably installed the city's first traffic lights and declared a switch to right-hand driving. In 1966, Farhad created the Afghan Social Democratic Party (also known as Afghan Mellat or "Afghan Nation") on the bases of Pashtun nationalism and pashtunization of multi ethnic Afghanistan where Pashtuns make the overall majority. He was elected to Parliament, representing the sixth district of Kabul, in 1968, but resigned his seat in 1970.
