= Fatherland Front =

Fatherland Front may refer to:

- Fatherland Front (Austria), the ruling political organisation of Austrofascism, 1933–1938
- Fatherland Front (Bulgaria), a communist resistance movement during World War II, dissolved in 1990
- National Fatherland Front, an umbrella organization for the People's Democratic Party of Afghanistan
- United Democratic Fatherland Front, a North Korean united front led by the Workers' Party of Korea
- Vietnamese Fatherland Front, a pro-government umbrella group
