= 1988 Afghan parliamentary election =

← 1969	6–15 April 1988	2005 →

All 234 seats in the House of the People
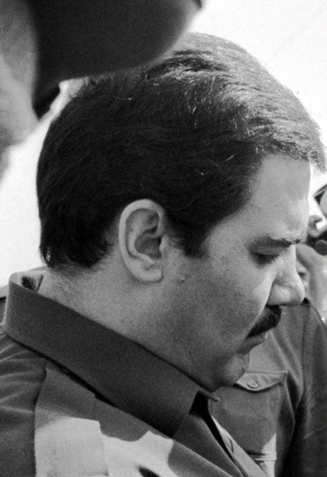
	First party
Leader	Mohammad Najibullah
Party	PDPA
Alliance	National Front
Seats won	184
Prime Minister before election
Sultan Ali Keshtmand
PDPA
Elected Prime Minister
Mohammad Hasan Sharq
Independent

Parliamentary elections were held in Afghanistan between 6 and 15 April 1988 to elect members of the bicameral National Assembly, which replaced the Revolutionary Council. Although the elections were marked by violence and boycotted by the mujahideen, the government left 50 of the 234 seats vacant in the House of the People and a small number of seats in the House of Elders, with hope that the guerrillas would abandon their armed struggle and present their own representatives to participate in the new administration. The National Front won every one of the seats contested, with the People's Democratic Party serving as the predominant party of the coalition.

== Results ==
Party	Votes	%	Seats
National Front			184
Vacant			50
Total			234
Total votes	1,547,000	–	
Source: Inter-Parliamentary Union
