= Democratic Youth Organisation of Afghanistan =

Defunct youth organisation in Afghanistan

Democratic Youth Organisation of Afghanistan سازمان دموکراتیک جوانان افغانستان
- Emblem of the DYOA

- Flag of the DYOA
- Headquarters: Revolution Park, Kabul
- Membership: 30,000+ (mid-1980s)
- Ideology: Communism; Marxism-Leninism; Progressivism; Secularism
- Position: Far-left
- Mother party: People's Democratic Party of Afghanistan
- International affiliation: World Federation of Democratic Youth; International Union of Socialist Youth

Poster advertising the DYOA.

The Democratic Youth Organisation of Afghanistan (Dari: سازمان دموکراتیک جوانان افغانستان, Sâzmân-e Damukrâtik-e Javânân-e Afghânistân), also known as the People's Youth Organisation of Afghanistan, was the main youth organisation in the former Democratic Republic of Afghanistan. It was the youth wing of the ruling People's Democratic Party of Afghanistan (PDPA). Upon turning seventeen years of age, members of the DYOA would become eligible for membership in the PDPA. By June 1978 the organisation had around 5,000 members.

In the mid-1980s it had around 25,000 members. The DYOA was a member of the World Federation of Democratic Youth.
