= History of Afghanistan (1978–1992) =

Period of Afghan history from 1978 to 1992

The Democratic Republic of Afghanistan was the government of Afghanistan between 1978 and 1992. It was recognised diplomatically by only eight countries which were allies of the Soviet Union. It was ideologically close to and economically and militarily dependent on the Soviet Union, and was a major belligerent of the Afghan Civil War.

== April 1978 revolution ==
In 1978 a prominent member of the People's Democratic Party of Afghanistan (PDPA), Mohammed Akbar Khaibar, was killed by the government of President Mohammed Daoud Khan. The leaders of the PDPA apparently feared that Daoud was planning to exterminate them all, especially since most of them were arrested, including Taraki, and Karmal, while Amin was put under house arrest where he gave instructions to his son to carry to his army which initiated the Saur Revolution, Hafizullah Amin a number of military wing officers of the PDPA managed to remain at large and organized.

On 27 April 1978 the PDPA, led by Nur Mohammad Taraki, Babrak Karmal and Amin overthrew the regime of Mohammad Daoud, who was killed the next day, along with most of his family. The uprising was known as the Great Saur Revolution ('Saur' means 'April' in Dari). On 1 May, Taraki became Chairman of the Revolutionary Council, Chairman of the Council of Ministers and General Secretary of the PDPA. The country was then renamed the Democratic Republic of Afghanistan (DRA), and the PDPA regime lasted, in some form or another, until April 1992.

The PDPA had split into several factions in 1967, soon after its founding. Ten years later the efforts of the Soviet Union had brought back together the Khalq faction of Taraki and the Parcham faction of Babrak Karmal. The "Saur Revolution," as the new government labeled its coup d'etat, after the month in the Islamic calendar in which it occurred, was almost entirely the achievement of the Khalq faction of the PDPA. This success gave it effective control over the armed forces, a great advantage over its Parchami rival. Khalq's victory was partially due to Daoud's miscalculation that Parcham was the more serious threat. Parcham's leaders had enjoyed widespread connections within the senior bureaucracy and even the royal family and the most privileged elite. These linkages also tended to make their movements easy to trace.

Khalq, on the other hand, had not been involved in Daoud's government, had little connection with Kabul's Persian speaking elite, and a rustic reputation based on recruitment of students from the provinces. Most of them were Pashtuns, especially the Ghilzais. They had few apparent connections in the senior bureaucracy, many had taken jobs as school teachers. Khalq's influence at Kabul University was also limited.

These newcomers to Kabul had seemed poorly positioned to penetrate the government. Moreover, they were led by the erratic Mohammed Taraki, a poet, sometime minor official, and a publicly notorious radical. Confident that his military officers were reliable, Daoud must have discounted the diligence of Taraki's lieutenant, Hafizullah Amin, who had sought out dissident Pashtun officers. The bungling of Amin's arrest, which enabled him to trigger the coup ahead of its planned date, also suggests Khalq's penetration of Daoud's security police.

The organisers of the coup had carried out a bold and sophisticated plan. It employed the shock effect of a combined armored and air assault on the Argor palace, the seat of Daoud's highly centralized government. Seizure of the initiative demoralized the larger loyal or uncommitted forces nearby. Quick capture of telecommunications, the defense ministry and other strategic centers of authority isolated Daoud's stubbornly resisting palace guard.

The coup was by far Khalq's most successful achievement. So much so, that considerable literature has accumulated arguing that it must have been planned and executed by the KGB, or some special branch of the Soviet military. Given the friction that soon developed between Khalq and Soviet officials, especially over the purging of Parcham, Soviet control of the coup seems unlikely. Prior knowledge of it does appear to have been highly likely. Claims that Soviet pilots bombed the palace overlook the availability of seasoned Afghan pilots.

Political leadership of the Democratic Republic of Afghanistan was asserted within three days of the military takeover. After thirteen years of conspiratorial activity, the two factions of the PDPA emerged in public, refusing at first, to admit their Marxist credentials. Khalq's dominance was quickly apparent. Taraki became head of state, head of government and General Secretary of the PDPA, Hafizullah Amin as deputy prime minister. Parcham's leader, Babrak Karmal was also named deputy prime minister. Cabinet membership was split eleven to ten, with Khalq in the majority. Khalq dominated the Revolutionary Council, which was to serve as the ruling body of the government. Within weeks purges of Parcham began and by summer Khalq's somewhat bewildered Soviet patrons became aware of how difficult it would be to temper its radicalism.

== Reforms and oppression, 1978–79 ==
Once in power, the PDPA implemented a socialist agenda. It moved to promote state atheism. Men were obliged to cut beards, women were banned from wearing the burqa, and mosques were placed off limits. It carried out an ambitious land reform, waiving farmers' debts countrywide and abolishing usury – intended to release the poorer farmers from debt peonage.

The government of the People's Democratic Party of Afghanistan moved to prohibit traditional practices which were deemed feudal in nature, including banning bride price and forced marriage. The minimum age for marriage was also raised. Education was stressed for both men and women and widespread literacy programmes were set up.

Such reforms however were not universally well-received, being viewed by many Afghans (particularly in rural areas) as the imposition of secular western values considered to be alien to Afghan culture and un-Islamic. As had happened earlier in the century, resentment with the government's programme and the manner in which it was imposed, along with widespread repression, provoked a backlash from tribal and Islamic leaders.

The PDPA "invited" the Soviet Union to assist in modernizing its economic infrastructure (predominantly its exploration and mining of rare minerals and natural gas). The USSR also sent contractors to build roads, hospitals and schools and to drill water wells; they also trained and equipped the Afghan army. Upon the PDPA's ascension to power, and the establishment of the DRA, the Soviet Union promised monetary aid amounting to at least $1.262 billion.

The destruction of Afghanistan's former ruling elite had begun immediately after the seizure of power. Execution (Parcham leaders later claimed at least 11,000 during the Taraki/Amin period), flight into exile, and later the devastation of Kabul itself would literally remove the great majority of the some 100,000 who had come to form Afghanistan's elite and middle class. Their loss almost completely broke the continuity of Afghanistan's leadership, political institutions and their social foundation. Karmal was dispatched to Czechoslovakia as ambassador, along with others shipped out of the country. Amin appeared to be the principal beneficiary of this strategy.

The Khalq leadership proved incapable of filling this vacuum. Its brutal and clumsy attempts to introduce radical changes in control over agricultural land holding and credit, rural social relations, marriage and family arrangements, and education led to scattered protests and uprisings among all major communities in the Afghan countryside. Taraki and Amin left a legacy of turmoil and resentment which gravely compromised later Marxist attempts to win popular acceptance.

The human rights violations of the Khalq extended beyond the educated elite. Between April 1978 and the Soviet invasion of December 1979, Afghan Communists executed an estimated 27,000 political prisoners at Pul-i-Charki prison six miles east of Kabul. Many of the victims were village mullahs and headmen who were obstructing the modernization and secularization of the intensely religious Afghan countryside. The Khalq leadership introduced to Afghanistan the "knock on the door in the middle of the night", previously little known in that country, where the central government usually lacked the power to enforce its will beyond Kabul.

The Government was constructed in classic Leninist fashion. Until 1985 it was governed by a provisional constitution, "The Fundamental Principles of the Democratic Republic of Afghanistan." Supreme sovereignty was vested in a Revolutionary Council, originally a body of fifty-eight members whose number later varied. Its executive committee, the Presidium, exercised power when the council was not in formal session. The Revolutionary Council was presided over by the president of the Democratic Republic.

Beneath the council the cabinet functioned under a Prime Minister, essentially in a format inherited from the pre-Marxist era. Two new ministries were added: Islamic Affairs and Tribes and Nationalities. Administrative arrangements for provincial and sub-provincial government were also retained.

In Leninist style, the PDPA was closely juxtaposed with the formal instruments of government. Its authority was generated by its Central Committee, whose executive stand-in was its Politburo. Presiding over both was the party's secretary general. Policy generation was the primary function of the executive level of the party, which was to be carried out by its members serving throughout the government.

On 5 December 1978 a friendship treaty was signed with the Soviet Union and was later used as a pretext for the Soviet invasion. Major uprisings occurred regularly against the government led by members of the traditional establishment who lost their privileges in the land reform. The government responded with heavy-handed military reprisals and arrested, exiled and executed many Mujahideen "holy Muslim warriors". The Mujahideen belonged to a number of different factions, but all shared, to varying degrees, a similarly conservative 'Islamic' ideology.

On 15 February 1979, the United States ambassador in Kabul, Adolph Dubs, was taken hostage by a group of Hazaras and later killed by them when Amin ordered the police to attack the US embassy. As the Hazaras were all eventually killed by the police, their actual motive in invading the US embassy remained unclear. The US did not appoint a new ambassador.

In mid-March the 17th infantry division in Herat under the control of Ismail Khan mutinied in support of Shi'ite Muslims. A hundred Soviet advisors in the city, and their families, were killed. The city was bombed, causing massive destruction and thousands of deaths and later it was recaptured with Afghan army tanks and paratroopers.

PDPA General Secretary Nur Muhammad Taraki visited Moscow on March 20, 1979, with a formal request for Soviet ground troops. Alexei Kosygin told him "we believe it would be a fatal mistake to commit ground troops... if our troops went in, the situation in your country... would get worse." Despite this statement Taraki negotiated some armed and humanitarian support – helicopter gunships with Russian pilots and maintenance crews, 500 military advisors, 700 paratroopers disguised as technicians to defend Kabul airport, also significant food aid (300,000 tons of wheat). Brezhnev still warned Taraki that full Soviet intervention "would only play into the hands of our enemies – both yours and ours."

The intense rivalry between Taraki and Amin within the Khalq faction heated up. Amin became prime minister on 28 March 1979 with Taraki remaining General Secretary and Chairman of the Revolutionary Council. In September 1979, Taraki's followers had made several attempts on Amin's life. However, it was Taraki who was overthrown and assassinated by being smothered with a pillow in his bed, with Amin assuming power in Afghanistan. Amin uprising was characterised as US backed, with several reports of Amin meeting CIA agents in Kabul. Amin also began attempts to moderate what many Afghans viewed as an Anti-Islam regime. His regime was still under pressure from the insurgency in the country and he tried to gain Pakistani or American support and refused to take Soviet advice. However, many Afghans held Amin responsible for the regime's harshest measures. The Soviet servicemen in Kabul speculated that Amin's rule would be marked by "harsh repression and... [result in] the activation and strengthening of the opposition... The situation can only be saved by the removal of Amin from power."

Taraki's death was first noted in the Kabul Times on October 10, which reported that the former leader only recently hailed as the "great teacher... great genius... great leader" had died quietly "of serious illness, which he had been suffering for some time." Less than three months later, after the Amin government had been overthrown, the newly installed followers of Babrak Karmal gave another account of Taraki's death. According to this account, Amin ordered the commander of the palace guard to have Taraki executed. Taraki reportedly was suffocated with a pillow over his head. Amin's emergence from the power struggle within the small divided communist party in Afghanistan alarmed the Soviets and would usher in the series of events which led to the Soviet invasion.

In Kabul, the ascension of Amin to the top position was quick. Amin began unfinished attempts to moderate what many Afghans viewed as an anti-Islam regime. Promising more religious freedom, repairing mosques, presenting copies of the Qur'an to religious groups, invoking the name of Allah in his speeches, and declaring that the Saur Revolution was "totally based on the principles of Islam." Yet many Afghans held Amin responsible for the regime's harshest measures.

The Soviets established a special commission on Afghanistan, of KGB chairman Andropov, Ponomaryev from the Central Committee and Ustinov, the defense minister. In late October they reported that Amin was purging his opponents, including Soviet sympathisers; his loyalty to Moscow was false; and that he was seeking diplomatic links with Pakistan and possibly China.

== Opposition forces ==
Outside observers usually identify the two warring groups as "fundamentalists" (or theocrats) and "traditionalists" (or monarchists). Rivalries between these groups continued during the Afghan civil war that followed the Soviet withdrawal. The rivalries of these groups brought the plight of the Afghans to the attention of the West, and it was they who received military assistance from the United States and a number of other nations.

Since 1973 (nearly five years before the revolution) Gulbuddin Hekmatyar, Ahmad Shah Massoud and Burhanuddin Rabbani, future fundamentalist warlords and leaders of the fight against the Soviet army had fled to Peshawar, in Pakistan to build up support with the help of the Pakistani government. A number of camps, military in origin, may have been conceived as rallying points around specific warlords with strong fundamentalist leanings, not just as neutral gathering places for refugees. In 1977, the Pakistani dictator, General Zia-Ul-Haq enforced an Islamic constitution, and backed the Afghan warlords in Peshawar, financing the building of thousands of madrassas in the vicinity of refugee camps, with help from Saudi Arabia.

The fundamentalists based their organizing principle around mass politics and included several divisions of the Jamiat-i-Islami. The leader of the parent branch, Rabbani, began organizing in Kabul before repression of religious conservatives, which began in 1974, forced him to flee to Pakistan during Daoud's regime. Among the leaders was Hekmatyar, who broke with Rabbani to form another resistance group, the Hizb-e-Islami, which became Pakistan's favoured arms recipient. Another split, engineered by Yunus Khales, resulted in a second group using the name Hizb-e-Islami—a group that was somewhat more moderate than Hikmatyar's. A fourth fundamentalist group was the Ittehad-i-Islami led by Abdul Rabb Rasuul al-Sayyaf, who would later invite Osama bin Laden to come to Afghanistan. Rabbani's group received its greatest support from northern Afghanistan where the best known resistance commander in Afghanistan—Massoud—a Tajik, like Rabbani, operated against the Soviets with considerable success.

The organizing principles of traditionalist groups differed from those of the fundamentalists. Formed from loose ties among ulama in Afghanistan, the traditionalist leaders were not concerned, unlike fundamentalists, with redefining Islam in Afghan society but instead focused on the use of the sharia as the source of law (interpreting the sharia is a principal role of the ulama). Among the three groups in Peshawar, the most important was the Jebh-e-Nejat-e-Milli led by Sibghatullah Mojadeddi. Some of the traditionalists were willing to accept restoration of the monarchy and looked to former King Mohammed Zahir Shah, exiled in Italy, as the ruler.

The traditionalist groups set about the active eradication of any kind of alternative secular opposition to Fundamentalist ideology, eliminating the dissident intellectuals - who also happened to oppose the Mudjhaddin groups.

Other ties also were important in holding together some resistance groups. Among these were links within sufi orders, such as the Mahaz-e-Milli Islami, one of the traditionalist groups associated with the Gilani Sufi order led by Pir Sayyid Gilani. Another group, the Shia Muslims of Hazarajat, organized the refugees in Iran.

== The Soviet–Afghan War, December 1979 ==
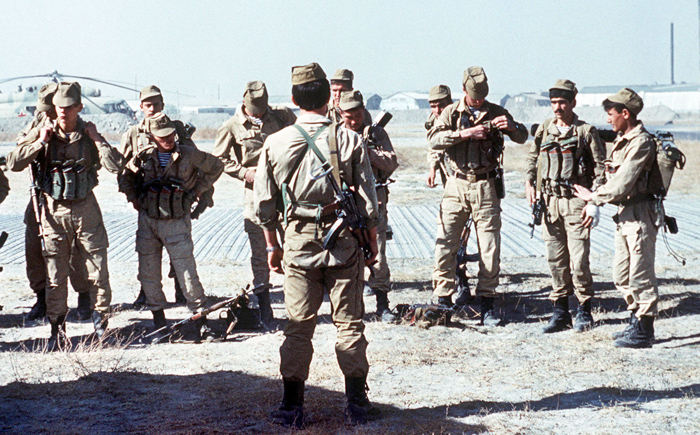
A Soviet Spetsnaz (special operations) group prepares for a mission in Afghanistan, 1988.

The Soviet–Afghan War began as midnight approached on December 27, 1979. USSR organized a massive military airlift into Kabul, involving an estimated 280 transport aircraft and 3 divisions of almost 8,500 men each. Within two days, Soviet forces secured Kabul, deploying a special Soviet assault unit against Darul Aman Palace, where elements of the Afghan army loyal to Hafizullah Amin put up a fierce, but brief resistance. With Amin's death at the palace, Babrak Karmal, exiled leader of the Parcham faction of the PDPA took place as Afghanistan's new head of government.

A number of theories have been advanced for the Soviet action. These interpretations of Soviet motives do not always agree – what is known for certain is that the decision was influenced by many factors – that in Leonid Brezhnev's words the decision to enter Afghanistan was truly "no simple decision." Two factors were certain to have figured heavily in Soviet calculations. The Soviet Union, interested in establishing a "cordon sanitaire" of friendly or neutral states on its frontiers, was increasingly alarmed at the unstable, unpredictable situation on its southern border. Additionally, the Brezhnev doctrine declared that the Soviet Union had a "zone of responsibility" where it had to come to the assistance of an endangered fellow socialist country. Presumably Afghanistan was a friendly regime that could not survive against growing pressure from the Pakistan backed Islamist resistance without direct assistance from the Soviet Union.

The government of Babrak Karmal faced several challenges. Strong connection to the Soviets prevented popular acceptance of the legitimacy of his government. Even though the Parchamis, themselves, had been among the groups most viciously persecuted by the Khalqis, their identification with 'Anti-Islam' Marxism and Soviet 'infidels' was not forgiven. Indeed, the decimation of their members forced the Soviets to insist on reconciliation between the two factions. The purging of Parchamis had left the military forces so dominated by Khalqis that the Soviets had no choice but to rely upon Khalqi officers to rebuild the army.

Soviet miscalculation of what was required to crush Afghan resistance further aggravated the government's situation. The Afghan army was expected to carry the burden of suppressing opposition, which was to be done quickly with Soviet support. As the war of pacification dragged on for years, the Karmal government was further weakened by the poor performance of its army.

Whatever the Soviet goals may have been, the international response was sharp and swift. U.S. President Jimmy Carter, reassessing the strategic situation in his State of the Union address in January 1980, identified Pakistan as a "front-line state" in the global struggle against communism. He reversed his stand of a year earlier that aid to Pakistan be terminated as a result of its nuclear program and offered Pakistan a military and economic assistance package if it would act as a conduit for United States and other assistance to the mujahedin. Pakistani President Muhammad Zia-ul-Haq refused Carter's package but later a larger aid offer from the Reagan administration was accepted. Questions about Pakistan's nuclear program were, for the time being, set aside.

Assistance also came from China, Egypt, and Saudi Arabia. Also forthcoming was international aid to help Pakistan deal with more than 3 million fleeing Afghan refugees. The foreign ministers of the Organisation of the Islamic Conference deplored the 'invasion' and demanded Soviet withdrawal at a meeting in Islamabad in January 1980. United Nations Security Council did not pass a resolution on the war, but the United Nations General Assembly regularly passed resolutions opposing the Soviet occupation.

In mid-January 1980 the Soviets relocated their command post from Termez, on Soviet territory to the north of Afghanistan, to Kabul. For ten years the Soviets and the DRA government battled the mujahedin for control of the country. The Soviets used helicopters (including Mil Mi-24 Hind gunships) as their primary air attack force, supported with fighter-bombers and bombers, ground troops and special forces. In some areas they conducted a scorched-earth campaign destroying villages, houses, crops, livestock etc.

== The search for popular support ==
Flag of the Democratic Republic of Afghanistan 1980–1987.

In attempts to broaden support, the PDPA created organizations and launched political initiatives intended to induce popular participation. The most ambitious was the National Fatherland Front (NFF), founded in June 1981. This umbrella organization created local units in cities, towns and tribal areas which were to recruit supporters of the regime. Village and tribal notables were offered inducements to participate in well publicized rallies and programs. The party also gave affiliated organizations that enrolled women, youth and city workers high-profile exposure in national radio, television, and government publications.

From its beginnings in the mid-1960s, the membership of the PDPA had taken keen interest in the impact of information and propaganda. Some years after their own publications had been terminated by the government, they gained control of all official media. These were energetically harnessed to their propaganda goals. Anis, the mainline government newspaper (published in Pashto and Dari), the Kabul New Times (previously the Kabul Times), published in English, and such new publications as Haqiqat-i-Inqelab-i-Saur exhibited the regime's flair for propaganda. With Kabul as its primary constituency, it also made innovative use of television.

The early efforts at mobilizing popular support were later followed up by national meetings and assemblies, eventually using a variation of the model of the traditional loya jirga to entice the cooperation of rural secular leaders and religious authorities. A large scale loya jirga was held in 1985 to ratify the DRA's new constitution.

These attempts to win collaboration were closely coordinated with efforts to manipulate Pashtun tribal politics. Such efforts included trying to split or disrupt tribes who affiliated with the resistance, or by compromising notables into commitments to raise militia forces in service to the government.

A concerted effort was made to win over the principal minorities: Uzbek, Turkmen, and Tajiks, in northern Afghanistan. For the first time their languages and literatures were prominently broadcast and published by government media. Minority writers and poets were championed, and attention was given to their folk art, music, dance and lore.

== Internal refugees: flight to the cities ==
As the Afghan–Soviet war became more destructive, internal refugees flocked to Kabul and the largest of the provincial cities. Varying estimates (no authentic census was taken) put Kabul's population at more than 2 million by the late 1980s. In many instances villagers fled to Kabul and other towns to join family or lineage groups already established there.

Between 3 and 4 million Afghans were thus subject to government authority and hence exposed to PDPA recruitment or affiliation. Its largest membership claim was 160,000, starting from a base of between 5,000 and 10,000 immediately after the Soviet invasion. How many members were active and committed was unclear, but the lure of perquisites, for example, food and fuel at protected prices, compromised the meaning of membership. Claims of membership in the NFF ran into the millions, but its core activists were mostly party members. When it was terminated in 1987, the NFF disappeared without impact.

== Factionalism: Khalq and Parcham ==
The PDPA was also never able to rid itself of internal rivalries. Burdened by obvious evidence that the Soviets oversaw its policies, actively dominated the crucial sectors of its government, and literally ran the war, the PDPA could not assert itself as a political force until after the Soviets left. In the civil war period that followed, it gained significant respect, but its internal disputes worsened.

Born divided, the PDPA suffered virtually continuous conflict between its two major factions. The Soviets imposed a public truce upon Parcham and Khalq, but the rivalry continued with hostility and disagreement frequently rising to the surface. Generally, Parcham enjoyed political dominance, while Khalq could not be denied the leverage over the army held by its senior officers.

Social, linguistic, and regional origins and differing degrees of Marxist radicalism had spurred factionalism from the beginning. When Soviet forces invaded, there was a fifteen-year history of disagreement, dislike, rivalry, violence and murder. Each new episode added further alienation. Events also tended to sub-divide the protagonists. Hafizullah Amin murder of Taraki divided the Khalqis. Rival military cliques divided the Khalqis further.

== Mohammad Najibullah, 1986–1992 ==
Parchami suffered a series of splits when the Soviets insisted on replacing Babrak Karmal with Mohammad Najibullah as general secretary of the PDPA on May 4, 1986. The PDPA was riven by divisions which prevented implementation of policies and compromised its internal security. These fundamental weaknesses were later partially masked by the urgency of rallying for common survival in the immediate aftermath of the Soviet withdrawal. Yet, after military successes rifts again began to surface.

Karmal retained the presidency for a while, but power had shifted to Najibullah, who had previously headed the State Information Service (Khadamate Ettelaate Dowlati–KHAD), the Afghan secret service agency. Najibullah tried to diminish differences with the resistance and appeared prepared to allow Islam a greater role as well as legalize opposition groups, but any moves he made toward concessions were rejected out of hand by the mujahedin.

Factionalism had a critical impact on the leadership of the PDPA. Najibullah's achievements as a mediator between factions, an effective diplomat, a clever foe, a resourceful administrator and a brilliant spokesman who coped with constant and changing turmoil throughout his six years as head of government, qualified him as a leader among Afghans. His leadership qualities might be summarized as conciliatory authoritarianism: a sure sense of power, how to get it, how to use it, but mediated by willingness to give options to rivals. This combination was glaringly lacking in most of his colleagues and rivals.

Najibullah suffered, to a lesser degree, the same disadvantage that Karmal had when he was installed as General Secretary of the PDPA by the Soviets. Despite Soviet interference and his own frustration and discouragement over the failure to generate substantial popular support, Karmal still had retained enough loyalty within the party to remain in office. This fact was shown by the fierceness of the resistance to Najibullah's appointment within the Parcham faction. This split persisted, forcing Najibullah to straddle his politics between whatever Parchami support he could maintain and alliances he could win from the Khalqis.

Najibullah's reputation was that of a secret police apparatchik with especially effective skills in disengaging Ghilzai and eastern Pashtuns from the resistance. Najibullah was himself a Ghilzai from the large Ahmedzai tribe. His selection by the Soviets was clearly related to his success in running KHAD, the secret police, more effectively than the rest of the DRA had been governed. His appointment thus, was not principally the result of intra-party politics. It was related to crucial changes in the Soviet–Afghan war that would lead to the Soviet military withdrawal.

== The Soviet decision to withdraw, 1986–1988 ==
The Soviets grossly underestimated the huge cost of the Afghan venture—described, in time, as the Soviet Union's Vietnam – to their state.

The peak of the fighting came in 1985–86. The Soviet forces launched their largest and most effective assaults on the mujahedin supply lines adjacent to Pakistan. Major campaigns had also forced the mujahedin into the defensive near Herat and Kandahar. The Soviets had multiple unexpected problems regarding the poor training, low morale and poor sanitation of their troops. The 40th Army was entirely unprepared for the mine warfare used by the Afghan rebels. Muslim soldiers in the Soviet forces were treated as second class citizens, had high desertion rates, and proved unreliable and unwilling; and were soon replaced by Slavs from Russia and Ukraine.

At the same time a sharp increase in military support for the mujahedin from the United States and Saudi Arabia allowed it to regain the guerilla war initiative. By late August 1986, the first FIM-92 Stinger ground-to-air missiles were used successfully. For nearly a year they would deny the Soviets and the Kabul government effective use of air power.

These shifts in momentum reinforced the inclination of the new Mikhail Gorbachev government to view further escalation of the war as a misuse of Soviet political and military capital. Such doubts had developed prior to the decision to install Mohammad Najibullah. In April 1985, one month after Gorbachev assumed the Soviet leadership, its May Day greeting to the Kabul government failed to refer to its "revolutionary solidarity" with the PDPA, a signal in Marxist–Leninist rhetoric that their relationship had been downgraded. Several months later, Babrak Karmal suggested the inclusion of non-party members in the Revolutionary Council and the promotion of a "mixed economy." These tentative concessions toward non-Marxists won Soviet praise, but divergence in policy became obvious at the Twenty-Seventh Congress of the Communist Party of the Soviet Union in February 1986. Gorbachev's "bleeding wound" speech hinted at a decision to withdraw "in the nearest future." In his own speech Karmal made no reference to withdrawal. In early May he was replaced by Najibullah.

Najibullah was obliged to move toward the evolving Soviet position with great caution. Karmal's followers could use any concessions to non-Marxists or acceptance of a Soviet withdrawal against him. Accordingly, he moved in conflicting directions, insisting there was no room for non-Marxists in government, only offering the possibility of clemency to "bandits" who had been duped by mujahedin leaders into resisting the government. In addition to air strikes and shelling across the border, KHAD terrorist activity in Pakistan reached its peak under Najibullah.

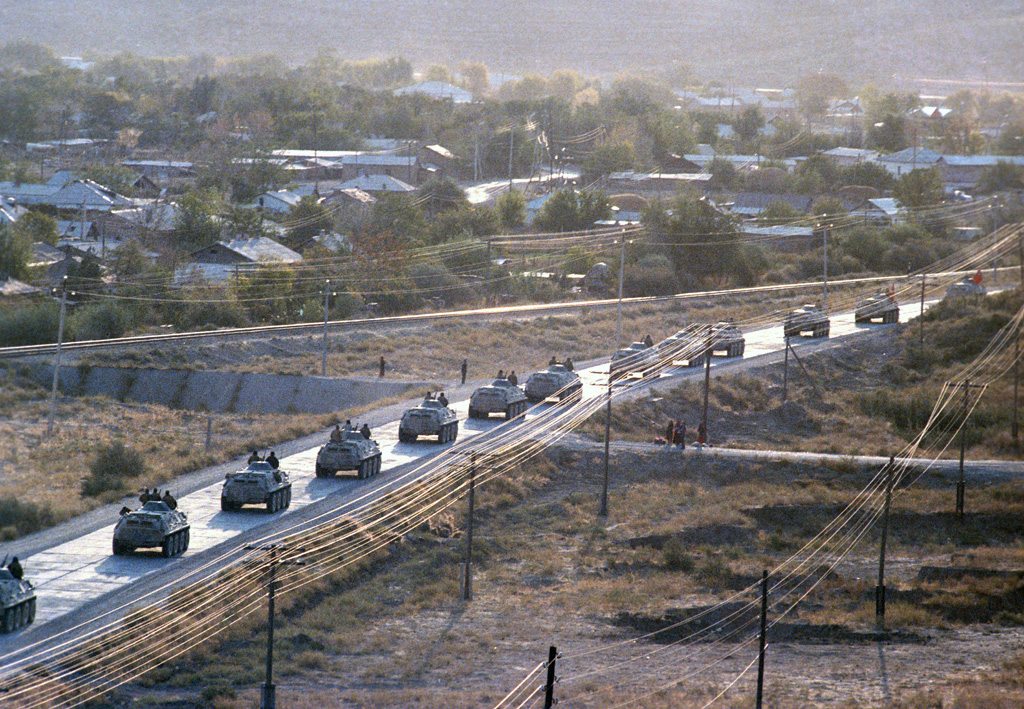
Soviet soldiers returning from Afghanistan. 20 October 1986, Kushka, Turkmenia.

Late in 1986 Najibullah had stabilized his political position enough to begin matching Moscow's moves toward withdrawal. In September he set up the National Compromise Commission to contact counterrevolutionaries "in order to complete the Saur Revolution in its new phase." Allegedly some 40,000 rebels were contacted. In November Karmal was replaced as now-ceremonial president by a non-party member, Haji Muhammad Samkanai, signaling the PDPA's willingness to open government to non-Marxists.

At the end of 1986 Najibullah unveiled a program of "National Reconciliation." It offered a six-month cease-fire and discussions leading to a possible coalition government in which the PDPA would give up its government monopoly. Contact was to be made with "anti-state armed groups." Affiliation was suggested, allowing resistance forces to retain areas under their control.

In fact much of the substance of the program was happening on the ground in the form of negotiations with disillusioned mujahedin commanders who agreed to cooperate as government militia. The mujahedin leadership rhetorically claimed that the program had no chance for success. For his part Najibullah assured his followers that there would be no compromise over "the accomplishments" of the Saur Revolution. It remained a standoff. While a strenuous propaganda effort was directed at both the Afghan refugees and Pakistanis in North-West Frontier, the program was essentially a sop to Moscow's hope to tie a favorable political settlement to its desire to pull its forces out.

Najibullah's concrete achievements were the consolidation of his armed forces, the expansion of co-opted militia forces and the acceptance of his government by an increasing proportion of urban population under his control. As a propaganda ploy "National Reconciliation" was a means of gaining time to prepare for civil war after the Soviet departure.

Disease and poor field sanitation proved disastrous for the Soviets. Of the 620,000 Soviets who served in Afghanistan, 14,500 were killed or died from wounds, accidents or disease—a low rate of 2.3%, plus 53,800 (11.4%) were wounded or injured. However, the rate of hospitalization was unusually high, as the 470,000 personnel hospitalized represented almost 76% of the men. In all 67% of those who served in Afghanistan required hospitalization for a serious illness. These included 115,000 cases of infectious hepatitis and 31,100 cases of typhoid fever, followed by plague, malaria, cholera, diphtheria, meningitis, heart disease, infectious dysentery, amoebic dysentery, rheumatism, heat stroke, pneumonia, typhus and paratyphus. According to Grau and Jorgensen contributing factors were shortage of potable water, unhygienic field practices, lice, and unbalanced food rations, as well as dependence on locally purchased items that carried disease. Unhygienic practices could have been dealt with by a professional noncommissioned officer corps but that was lacking.

== The Geneva accords, 1987–1989 ==
By the beginning of 1987, the controlling fact in the Afghan war was the Soviet Union's determination to withdraw. It would not renege on its commitment to the Kabul government's survival—Mikhail Gorbachev's options were restricted by Soviet military insistence that Kabul not be abandoned. Nevertheless, the Soviet leadership was convinced that resolution of Cold War issues with the West and internal reform were far more urgent than the fate of the Kabul government.

Other events outside Afghanistan, especially in the Soviet Union, contributed to the eventual agreement. The toll in casualties, economic resources, and loss of support at home increasingly felt in the Soviet Union was causing criticism of the occupation policy. Leonid Brezhnev died in 1982, and after two short-lived successors, Mikhail Gorbachev assumed leadership in March 1985. As Gorbachev opened up the country's system, it became clearer that the Soviet Union wished to find a face-saving way to withdraw from Afghanistan.

The civil war in Afghanistan was guerrilla warfare and a war of attrition between government and the mujahedin; it cost both sides a great deal. Up to five million Afghans, or one-quarter of the country's population, fled to Pakistan and Iran, where they organized into guerrilla groups to strike Soviet and government forces inside Afghanistan. Others remained in Afghanistan and also formed fighting groups; Ahmed Shah Massoud led one of these in the northeastern part of Afghanistan. These various groups were supplied with funds to purchase arms, principally from the United States, Saudi Arabia, People's Republic of China, and Egypt. Despite high casualties on both sides, pressure continued to mount on the Soviet Union, especially after the United States brought in FIM-92 Stinger anti-aircraft missiles which severely reduced the effectiveness of Soviet air cover.

Conveniently, a formula was readily available for minimizing the humiliation of reversing a policy in which enormous political, material, and human capital had been invested. In 1982 under the auspices of the office of its secretary general, the UN had initiated negotiations facilitating a Soviet withdrawal from Afghanistan. Its format had essentially been agreed upon by 1985. Ostensibly it was the product of indirect negotiations between the DRA and Pakistan (Pakistan did not recognize the DRA) with the mediation of the secretary general's special representative, Diego Cordovez. The United States and the Soviet Union had committed themselves to guaranteeing the implementation of an agreement leading to a withdrawal.

Both the format and the substance of the agreement were designed to be acceptable to the Soviet Union and the DRA. Its clauses included affirmation of the sovereignty of Afghanistan and its right to self-determination, its right to be free from foreign intervention or interference, and the right of its refugees to a secure and honorable return. But at its core was an agreement reached in May 1988 that authorized the withdrawal of "foreign troops" according to a timetable that would remove all Soviet forces by February 15, 1989.

The accords emerged from initiatives by Moscow and Kabul in 1981. They had claimed that Soviet forces had entered Afghanistan in order to protect it from foreign forces intervening on the side of rebels attempting to overthrow the DRA. The logic of the Geneva Accords was based on this accusation, that is, that once the foreign threat to Afghanistan was removed, the forces of its friend, the Soviet Union, would leave. For that reason a bilateral agreement between Pakistan, which was actively supporting the resistance, and the DRA prohibiting intervention and interference between them was essential. In meticulous detail each party agreed to terminate any act that could remotely affect the sovereignty or security of the other. This agreement included preventing an expatriate or a refugee from publishing a statement which his/her government could construe as a contribution to unrest within its territory. The bilateral agreement between the Afghanistan and Pakistan on the principles of non-interference and non-intervention was signed on April 14, 1988.

The accords thus facilitated a withdrawal by an erstwhile superpower, in a manner which justified an invasion. They exemplify the delicacy of UN diplomacy when the interests of a great power are engaged. In essence, the accords were a political bailout for a government struggling with the consequences of a costly error. The UN could not insist that accusations of national culpability were relevant to the negotiations. In the case of Afghanistan, the Soviet Union insisted on its own diplomatic terms as did the United States in a different manner concerning Vietnam.

The agreement on withdrawal held, and on February 15, 1989, the last Soviet troops departed on schedule from Afghanistan. Their exit, however, did not bring either lasting peace or resettlement.

== The failure to bring peace ==
The accords did not bring peace to Afghanistan. There was little expectation among its enemies or the Soviet Union that the Kabul government would survive. Its refusal to collapse introduced a three-year period of civil war. The Geneva process failed to prevent the further carnage which a political solution among Afghans might have prevented or lessened. It failed partially because the Geneva process prevented participation by the Afghan resistance. The Democratic Republic of Afghanistan (DRA) occupied Afghanistan's seat at the United Nations General Assembly. Denied recognition, the resistance leadership resented the central role that DRA was permitted to play at Geneva. When the UN representative Diego Cordovez approached the mujahedin parties to discuss a possible political settlement in February 1988—more than five years after negotiations began—they were not interested. Their bitterness would hover over subsequent efforts to find a political solution.

Considerable diplomatic energy was expended throughout 1987 to find a political compromise that would end the fighting before the Soviets left. While Pakistan, the Soviet Union and the DRA haggled over a timetable for the Soviet withdrawal, Cordovez worked on a formula for an Afghan government that would reconcile the combatants. The formula involved Mohammed Zahir Shah, and by extension, the leading members of his former government, most of whom had gone into exile. This approach also called for a meeting in the loya jirga tradition representing all Afghan protagonists and communities. It was to reach a consensus on the features of a future government. The jirgah also was to select a small group of respected leaders to act as a transitional government in place of the Kabul government and the mujahedin. During the transition a new constitution was to be promulgated and elections conducted leading to the installation of a popularly accepted government. This package kept re-emerging in modified forms throughout the civil war that followed. Suggested roles for the king and his followers slipped into and out of these formulas, despite the implacable opposition of most of the mujahedin leaders.

The peace prospect faltered because no credible consensus was attainable. By mid-1987 the resistance forces sensed a military victory. They had stymied what proved to be the last set of major Soviet offensives, the Stinger missiles were still having a devastating effect, and they were receiving an unprecedented surge of outside assistance. Defeat of the Kabul government was their solution for peace. This confidence, sharpened by their distrust of the UN virtually guaranteed their refusal of a political compromise.

== Pakistan's attempt at a political solution, 1987–1988 ==
Pakistan was the only protagonist in a position to convince the mujahedin otherwise. Its intimate relationship with the parties it hosted had shaped their war and their politics. Their dependence on Pakistan for armaments, training, funding and sanctuary had been nearly total. But by 1987, the politics of Pakistan's foreign policy had fragmented. The Foreign Ministry was working with Diego Cordovez to devise a formula for a "neutral" government. President Zia-ul-Haq was adamantly convinced that a political solution favoring the mujahedin was essential and worked strenuously to convince the United States and the Soviet Union. Riaz Mohammad Khan argues that disagreement within the military and with Zia's increasingly independent prime minister, Muhammad Khan Junejo, deflected Zia's efforts. When Mikhail Gorbachev announced a Soviet withdrawal without a peace settlement at his meeting with President Reagan on December 10, 1987, the chance for a political agreement was lost. All the protagonists were then caught up in the rush to complete the Geneva process.

In the end the Soviets were content to leave the possibilities of reconciliation to Najibullah and to shore him up with massive material support. He had made an expanded reconciliation offer to the resistance in July, 1987 including twenty seats in State (formerly Revolutionary) Council, twelve ministries and a possible prime ministership and Afghanistan's status as an Islamic non-aligned state. Military, police, and security powers were not mentioned. The offer still fell far short of what even the moderate mujahedin parties would accept. Najibullah then reorganized his government to face the mujahedin alone. A new constitution took effect in November, 1987. The name of the country was reverted to the Republic of Afghanistan, the State Council was replaced by a National Assembly for which "progressive parties" could freely compete. Mohammed Hassan Sharq, a non-party politician, was named prime minister. Najibullah's presidency was given new powers and presumed longevity. He was promptly elected to a seven-year term. On paper, Afghan government appeared far more democratic than Mohammed Daoud Khan had left it, but its popular support remained questionable.

== Stalemate: The Civil War, 1989–1992 ==
The Soviet Union left Afghanistan deep in winter with intimations of panic among Kabul officials. Hard experience had convinced Soviet officials that the government was too factionalized to survive. Pakistani and United States officials expected a quick mujahedin victory. The resistance was poised to attack provincial towns and cities and eventually Kabul, if necessary. The first one to fall might produce a ripple effect that would unravel the government.

Within three months, these expectations were dashed at Jalalabad. An initial assault penetrated the city's defenses and reached its airport. A counterattack, supported by effective artillery and air power, drove the mujahedin back. Uncoordinated attacks on the city from other directions failed. The crucial supply road to the garrison from Kabul was reopened. By May 1989 it was clear that the Kabul forces in Jalalabad had held.

The Mujahedin were traumatized by this failure. It exposed their inability to coordinate tactical movements or logistics or to maintain political cohesion. During the next three years, they were unable to overcome these limitations. Only one significant provincial capital, Taloqan, was captured and held. Mujahedin positions were expanded in the northeast and around Herat, but their inability to mass forces capable of overcoming a modern army with the will to fight from entrenched positions was clear. A deadly exchange of medium-range rockets became the principal form of combat, embittering the urban population, and adding to the obstacles that prevented millions of refugees from returning.

Victory at Jalalabad dramatically revived the morale of the Kabul government. Its army proved able to fight effectively alongside the already hardened troops of the Soviet-trained special security forces. Defections decreased dramatically when it became apparent that the resistance was in disarray, with no capability for a quick victory. The change in atmosphere made recruitment of militia forces much easier. As many as 30,000 troops were assigned to the defense of Herat alone.

Immediately after the Soviet departure, Najibullah pulled down the façade of shared government. He declared an emergency, removed Sharq and the other non-party ministers from the cabinet. The Soviet Union responded with a flood of military and economic supplies. Sufficient food and fuel were made available for the next two difficult winters. Much of the military equipment belonging to Soviet units evacuating Eastern Europe was shipped to Afghanistan. Assured adequate supplies, Kabul's air force, which had developed tactics minimizing the threat from Stinger missiles, now deterred mass attacks against the cities. Medium-range missiles, particularly the Scud, were successfully launched from Kabul in the defense of Jalalabad, 145 kilometers miles away. One reached the suburbs of Pakistan's capital, Islamabad, more than 400 kilometers away. Soviet support reached a value of $3 billion a year in 1990. Kabul had achieved a stalemate which exposed the mujahedin's weaknesses, political and military.

== Reagan calls for rollback of Communism: 1981–1988 ==
Taking office in early 1981 as President of the United States Ronald Reagan began a rollback strategy of supporting insurgencies in Nicaragua, Cambodia, Angola, and, above all, in Afghanistan. The goal, especially after 1984, was to bleed Moscow white—to create a Vietnam for them which would suck their military dry. James Scott concludes, "The Reagan Doctrine had its greatest success in Afghanistan, where the evidence suggests it made a direct contribution to the Soviet Union's decision to withdraw its troops, and had a significant impact on broader changes in Soviet foreign policy." "We control Kabul and the provincial centers, but on occupied territory we cannot establish authority," the Soviet Defense Minister explained to the Politburo in 1986. "We have lost the battle for the Afghan people."

Mikhail Gorbachev came to power in 1985 and immediately realized the severe drain caused by trying to hold his Communist empire together, especially as the U.S. was escalating military spending, threatening to build Star Wars, and the Soviet economy was faltering badly as revenues plunged from oil exports. It took him several years to get enough Politburo support, and all the time the poor performance and prolonged presence of the Soviet military in Afghanistan created domestic financial and political problems. In 1986 he replaced Karmal with Mohammed Najibullah, the head of the secret police (KHAD) and leader of the Parcham faction. Finally in 1988 to save the heart of the Communist system in Russia he admitted defeat and cut his losses in Afghanistan.

== Boris Yeltsin takes power in Moscow 1991 ==
With the failure of the communist hardliners to take over the Soviet government in August 1991, Mohammad Najibullah's supporters in the Soviet Army lost their power to dictate Afghan policy. The effect was immediate. On September 13, the Russian government, now dominated by Boris Yeltsin, agreed with the United States on a mutual cut off of military aid to both sides in the Afghan civil war. It was to begin January 1, 1992.

The post-coup Soviet government then attempted to develop political relations with the Afghan resistance. In mid-November it invited a delegation of the resistance's Afghanistan Interim Government (AIG) to Moscow where the Soviets agreed that a transitional government should prepare Afghanistan for national elections. The Soviets did not insist that Najibullah or his colleagues participate in the transitional process. Having been cut adrift both materially and politically, Najibullah's faction torn government began to fall apart.

During the nearly three years that the Kabul government had successfully defended itself against mujahedin attacks, factions within the government had also developed quasi-conspiratorial connections with its opponents. Even during the Soviet war Kabul's officials had arranged ceasefires, neutral zones, highway passage and even passes allowing unarmed mujahedin to enter towns and cities. As the civil war developed into a stalemate in 1989, such arrangements proliferated into political understandings. Combat generally ceased around Kandahar because most of the mujahedin commanders had an understanding with its provincial governor. Ahmed Shah Massoud developed an agreement with Kabul to keep the vital north–south highway open after the Soviet withdrawal. The greatest mujahedin victory during the civil war, the capture of Khost, was achieved through the collaboration of its garrison. In March 1990 Gulbuddin Hekmatyar cooperated with an attempted coup by the Khalqi Defense minister Shah Nawaz Tanai: Hekmatyar's forces were to attack Kabul simultaneously. The plot misfired because of faulty communications. Tanai escaped by helicopter to Pakistan where he was greeted and publicly accepted as an ally by Hekmatyar.

Interaction with opponents became a major facet of Najibullah's defensive strategy, Many mujahedin groups were literally bought off with arms, supplies and money to become militias defending towns, roads and installations. Such arrangements carried the danger of backfiring. When Najibullah's political support ended and the money dried up, such allegiances crumbled.

== The fall of Kabul, April 1992 ==
Kabul ultimately fell to the mujahedin because the factions in its government had finally pulled it apart. Until demoralized by the defections of its senior officers, the army had achieved a level of performance it had never reached under direct Soviet tutelage. It was a classic case of loss of morale. The regime collapsed while it still possessed material superiority. Its stockpiles of munitions and planes would provide the victorious mujahedin with the means of waging years of highly destructive war. Kabul was short of fuel and food at the end of winter in 1992, but its military units were supplied well enough to fight indefinitely. They did not fight because their leaders were reduced to scrambling for survival. Their aid had not only been cut off, the Marxist–Leninist ideology that had provided the government its rationale for existence had been repudiated at its source.

A few days after it was clear that Najibullah had lost control, his army commanders and governors arranged to turn over authority to resistance commanders and local notables throughout the country. Joint councils or shuras were immediately established for local government in which civil and military officials of the former government were usually included. Reports indicate the process was generally amicable. In many cases prior arrangements for transferring regional and local authority had been made between foes.

These local arrangements generally remained in place in most of Afghanistan until at least 1995. Disruptions occurred where local political arrangements were linked to the struggle that developed between the mujahedin parties. At the national level a political vacuum was created and into it fell the expatriate parties in their rush to take control. The enmities, ambitions, conceits and dogmas which had paralysed their shadow government proved to be even more disastrous in their struggle for power. The traits they brought with them had been accentuated in the struggle for preferment in Peshawar.

Collusions between military leaders quickly brought down the Kabul government. In mid-January 1992, within three weeks of demise of the Soviet Union, Ahmed Shah Massoud was aware of conflict within the government's northern command. General Abdul Momim, in charge of the Hairatan border crossing at the northern end of Kabul's supply highway, and other non-Pashtun generals based in Mazari Sharif feared removal by Najibullah and replacement by Pashtun officers. The generals rebelled and the situation was taken over by Abdul Rashid Dostam, who held general rank as head of the Jozjani militia, also based in Mazari Sharif. He and Massoud reached a political agreement, together with another major militia leader, Sayyid Mansor, of the Ismaili community based in Baghlan province. These northern allies consolidated their position in Mazari Sharif on March 21. Their coalition covered nine provinces in the north and northeast. As turmoil developed within the government in Kabul, there was no government force standing between the northern allies and the major air force base at Bagram, some seventy kilometres north of Kabul. By mid-April the air force command at Begram had capitulated to Massoud. Kabul was defenseless; its army was no longer reliable.

Najibullah had lost internal control immediately after he announced his willingness on March 18 to resign in order to make way for a neutral interim government. As the government broke into several factions the issue had become how to carry out a transfer of power. Najibullah attempted to fly out of Kabul on April 17, but was stopped by Dostam's troops who controlled Kabul Airport under the command of Babrak Karmal's brother, Mahmud Baryalai. Vengeance between Parchami factions was reaped. Najibullah took sanctuary at the UN mission where he remained until his hanging by the Taliban in 1996. A group of Parchami generals and officials declared themselves an interim government for the purpose of handing over power to the mujahedin.

For more than a week Massoud remained poised to move his forces into the capital. He was awaiting the arrival of political leadership from Peshawar. The parties suddenly had sovereign power in their grasp, but no plan for executing it. With his principal commander prepared to occupy Kabul, Burhanuddin Rabbani was positioned to prevail by default. Meanwhile, UN mediators tried to find a political solution that would assure a transfer of power acceptable to all sides.

== The United Nations plan for political accommodation ==
UN official Benan Sevanwas Cordovez's successor as special representative of the UN secretary general. He attempted to apply a political formula that had been announced by UN Secretary General Javier Pérez de Cuéllar on May 21, 1991. Referred to as a five-point plan, it included: recognition of Afghanistan's sovereign status as a politically non-aligned Islamic state; acceptance of the right of Afghans to self-determination in choosing their form of government and social and economic systems; need for a transitional period permitting a dialogue between Afghans leading to establishment of a government with widely based support; the termination of all foreign arms deliveries into Afghanistan; funding from the international community adequate to support the return of Afghanistan's refugees and its reconstruction from the devastation of war.

These principles were endorsed by the Soviet Union and the United States and Afghanistan's neighboring governments, but there was no military means of enforcing it. The three moderate Peshawar parties accepted it, but it was opposed by Gulbuddin Hekmatyar, Burhanuddin Rabbani, Rasool Sayyaf and Mawlawi Yunis Khalis who held out for a total victory over the Kabul government.

Nevertheless, these four "fundamentalists" found it politic to participate in the effort to implement the UN initiative. Pressure from their foreign supporters and the opportunities that participation offered to modify or obstruct the plan encouraged them to be reluctant players. Pakistan and Iran worked jointly to win mujahedin acceptance at a conference in July, 1991. Indicating its formal acceptance of the plan, Pakistan officially announced the termination of its own military assistance to the resistance in late January 1992. Najibullah also declared his acceptance, but until March 18, 1992, he hedged the question of whether or when he would resign in the course of negotiations.

Sevan made a strenuous effort to create the mechanism for the dialogue that would lead to installation of the transitional process envisaged in point three of the plan. The contemplated arrangement was a refinement and a simplification of earlier plans which had been built around the possible participation of Mohammed Zahir Shah and the convoking of a meeting in the loya jirga tradition. By March 1992 the plan had evolved to the holding of a meeting in Europe of some 150 respected Afghans representing all communities in the late spring. Most of Sevan's effort was directed at winning the cooperation of all the Afghan protagonists, including the Shia parties in control of the Hazarajat. In early February, he appeared to have won the active support of commanders among the Pashtuns in eastern Afghanistan and acquiescence from Rabbani and Hekmatyar to the extent of submitting lists of participants acceptable to them in the proposed meeting. Simultaneously, Sevan labored to persuade Najibullah to step down on the presumption that his removal would bring about full mujahedin participation. Instead, Najibullah's March 18 announcement accelerated the collapse of his government. This collapse in turn triggered events that moved faster than Sevan's plan could be put into effect.

In the midst of hectic manoeuvring to put the European meeting together, Sevan declared on April 4 that most of the parties (including Hekmatyar's) and the Kabul government had agreed to transfer power to a proposed transitional authority. He also announced the creation of a "pre-transition council" to take control of government "perhaps within the next two weeks." He was struggling to keep up with events which threatened to dissolve the government before he had a replacement for it.

In the end, some of the Shia parties and the Islamists in Peshawar blocked his scheme. They withheld their choices or submitted candidates for the European meeting whom they knew would be unacceptable to others. The hope for a neutral, comprehensive approach to a political settlement among Afghans was dashed. Sevan then worked to ensure a peaceful turnover of power from the interim Kabul government which replaced Najibullah on April 18 to the forces of Ahmed Shah Massoud and Abdul Rashid Dostam. In effect, the turnover was peaceful, but without an overall political settlement in place. Within a week, a new civil war would begin among the victors as the era of the Islamic State of Afghanistan began.

== Sources ==
- Library of Congress Country Study of Afghanistan; much of this article is copied from this U.S. government publication; it is not copyright.
