= Democratic Republic of Afghanistan =

Afghan state from 1978 to 1992

Democratic Republic of Afghanistan (1978–1987) د افغانستان ډموکراتيک جمهوريت (Pashto) جمهورى دموکراتیک افغانستان (Dari) Republic of Afghanistan (1987–1992) د افغانستان جمهوريت (Pashto) جمهوری افغانستان (Dari)
- 1978–1992
- Flag of Afghanistan; Top: Flag (1978–1980); Bottom: Flag (1980–1987); Top: Emblem (1978–1980); Bottom: Emblem (1980–1987)
- Anthem: ګرم شه، لا ګرم شه; Garam shah lā garam shah "Be Ardent, Be More Ardent"
- Status: Satellite state of the Soviet Union (until 1991): under Soviet military occupation (1979–1989)
- Capital and largest city: Kabul; 34°31′N 69°11′E
- Official languages: Pashto; Dari
- Recognized regional languages: List: Hazaragi; Uzbek; Tajik; Arabic; Turkmen; Balochi; Pashayi; Nuristani; Kyrgyz; Pamiri
- Religion: Secular state; Majority Muslim
- Demonym: Afghan
- Government: Unitary communist state (de facto 1978–1987) Unitary socialist state (de jure 1978–1992)
- Top Leader
  - 1978–1979: Nur Muhammad Taraki
  - 1979: Hafizullah Amin
  - 1979–1986: Babrak Karmal
  - 1986–1992: Mohammad Najibullah
- Head of State
  - 1978–1979 (first): Nur Muhammad Taraki
  - 1992 (last): Abdul Rahim Hatif (acting)
- Head of Government
  - 1978–1979 (first): Nur Muhammad Taraki
  - 1990–1992 (last): Fazal Haq Khaliqyar
- Legislature: Revolutionary Council (1978–1987); National Assembly (from 1987)
  - Upper house: House of Elders (1988–1992)
  - Lower house: House of the People (1988–1992)
- Historical era: Cold War, Afghan conflict
  - Saur Revolution: 27–28 April 1978
  - Established: 30 April 1978
  - 1979 uprisings: 15 March 1979
  - Soviet invasion: 25 December 1979
  - 1987 Loya jirga: 29/30 November 1987
  - Soviet withdrawal: 15 February 1989
  - 1990 coup attempt: 6 March 1990
  - Fall of Kabul: 28 April 1992

Area
  - Total: 652,864 km^{2} (252,072 sq mi) (40th)
  - Water (%): negligible

Population
  - 1990 estimate: 15,900,000
- HDI (1992): ▲0.316 low
- Currency: Afghani (AFA)
- Time zone: UTC+4:30 Solar Calendar
- Calling code: 93
- ISO 3166 code: AF
Preceded by	Succeeded by
Republic of Afghanistan	Islamic State of Afghanistan; Territory of Junbish-e Milli

The Democratic Republic of Afghanistan, (Note: Pashto: دافغانستان دمکراتی جمهوریت, Dǝ Afġānistān Dimukratī Jumhūriyat; Dari: جمهوری دمکراتی افغانستان, Jumhūri-ye Dimukrātī-ye Afġānistān) later known as the Republic of Afghanistan, (Note: Pashto: د افغانستان جمهوریت, Dǝ Afġānistān Jumhūriyat; Dari: جمهوری افغانستان, Jumhūrī-ye Afġānistān) was the Marxist–Leninist-led Afghan state from 1978 to 1992. It was bordered by Pakistan to the east and south, by Iran to the west, by the Soviet Union to the north, and by China to the northeast. Established by the People's Democratic Party of Afghanistan (PDPA) following the Saur Revolution in April 1978, it came to rely heavily on the Soviet Union for financial and military assistance and was therefore widely considered to be a Soviet satellite state. The PDPA's rise to power is seen as the beginning of the ongoing Afghan conflict, and the majority of the country's years in existence were marked by the Soviet–Afghan War. It collapsed by the end of the First Afghan Civil War in April 1992, having lasted only four months after the dissolution of the Soviet Union.

The PDPA began ruling Afghanistan after ousting the unelected autocrat Mohammad Daoud Khan, who had become president by leading the 1973 Afghan coup d'état; he was succeeded by Nur Muhammad Taraki as the head of state and government on 30 April 1978. Both Taraki and his successor Hafizullah Amin, who had organized the Saur Revolution as the General Secretary of the PDPA, introduced several contentious reforms during their time in office, such as land and marriage reforms and an enforced policy of de-Islamization vis-à-vis the promotion of socialism. Amin, in particular, built upon Khan's reforms with even more radical legislation for Afghanistan's conservative Muslim society, such as universal education and equal rights for women. Soon afterwards, a power struggle began between two PDPA factions: the hardline Khalq, led by Taraki and Amin; and the moderate Parcham, led by Babrak Karmal. The Khalqists eventually emerged victorious and subsequently purged the bulk of the Parchamite ranks, while also exiling most of the prominent Parcham leaders to the Soviet Union and the Eastern Bloc.

Following the Khalq–Parcham conflict, a power struggle arose within the Khalq faction itself, as Taraki and Amin increasingly contested each other's influence. Amin gained the upper hand among the Khalqists and later had Taraki killed on his orders. Due to his earlier reforms, however, Amin's rule proved to be unpopular throughout most of Afghanistan, with the country's emerging instability prompting the Soviet government to begin planning for a direct military intervention in favour of the Parchamites. On 27 December 1979, the Soviet Union launched Operation Storm-333, assaulting the Tajbeg Palace in Kabul and assassinating Amin, who was then replaced by Karmal. The Karmal era, which lasted from 1979 to 1986, was marked by the height of the Soviet–Afghan War. As the Soviet and Afghan militaries fought against the Afghan mujahideen, which had been bolstered by military aid from the Muslim world and the Western Bloc, the country rapidly destabilized, resulting in widespread civilian casualties and the creation of millions of refugees, most of whom fled to Pakistan and Iran. In April 1980, the "Fundamental Principles" (comprising a constitution) were introduced by Karmal's administration, and several non-PDPA members were allowed into the government to broaden the country's support base. However, these policies ultimately failed to bring peace to Afghanistan, and in 1986, Karmal was succeeded by Mohammad Najibullah.

Najibullah pursued a policy known as National Reconciliation: a new constitution was introduced in 1987 and democratic elections were held in 1988, though they were boycotted by the mujahideen. After almost a decade of warfare, the Soviet Union withdrew from Afghanistan in February 1989, but continued to back the PDPA, which was facing mounting resistance from the opposition. By 1990, another constitution was introduced, stating that Afghanistan's true nature was that of an Islamic republic and transforming the PDPA into the Watan Party. On the military front, the government still proved to be capable of performing in open combat, as demonstrated in the Battle of Jalalabad. However, with growing internal difficulties, such as the 1990 Khalqist coup attempt, and the dissolution of the Soviet Union in December 1991, the Najibullah government was unable to sustain itself and ultimately lost the First Afghan Civil War in April 1992, which, in turn, triggered the Second Afghan Civil War. Afghanistan eventually transitioned to an Islamic Republic which remained from 2004 to 2021.

== History ==
=== Saur Revolution and Taraki: 1978–1979 ===
Mohammad Daoud Khan, the President of the Republic of Afghanistan from 1973 to 1978, was ousted during the Saur Revolution (April Revolution) following the death of Mir Akbar Khyber, a Parchamite politician from the People's Democratic Party of Afghanistan (PDPA), who died under mysterious circumstances. Hafizullah Amin, a Khalqist, was the coup's chief architect. Nur Muhammad Taraki, the leader of the Khalqists, was elected Chairman of the Presidium of the Revolutionary Council, Chairman of the Council of Ministers and retained his post as General Secretary of the PDPA Central Committee. Under him was Babrak Karmal, the leader of the Parcham faction, as Deputy Chairman of the Revolutionary Council and Deputy Chairman of the Council of Ministers, Amin as Council of Ministers deputy chairman and Minister of Foreign Affairs, and Mohammad Aslam Watanjar as Council of Ministers deputy chairman. The appointment of Karmal, Amin and Watanjar as Council of Ministers deputy chairmen proved unstable, and it led to three different governments being established within the government; the Khalq faction was answerable to Amin, the Parchamites were answerable to Karmal and the military officers (who were Parchamites) were answerable to Watanjar.

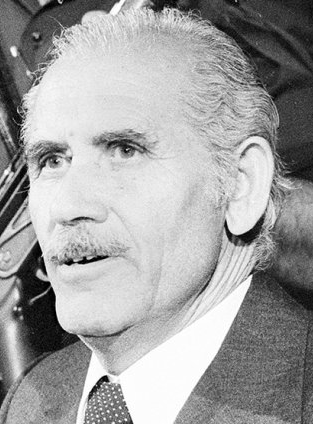
Nur Muhammad Taraki, c. 1978–1979.

The first conflict between the Khalqists and Parchamites arose when the Khalqists wanted to give PDPA Central Committee membership to military officers who participated in the Saur Revolution. Amin, who previously opposed the appointment of military officers to the PDPA leadership, altered his position; he now supported their elevation. The PDPA Politburo voted in favour of giving membership to the military officers; the victors (the Khalqists) portrayed the Parchamites as opportunists (they implied that the Parchamites had ridden the revolutionary wave, but not actually participated in the revolution). To make matters worse for the Parchamites, the term Parcham was, according to Taraki, a word synonymous with factionalism. On 27 June, three months after the revolution, Amin managed to outmaneuver the Parchamites at a Central Committee meeting. The meeting decided that the Khalqists had the exclusive right to formulate and decide policy, which left the Parchamites impotent. Karmal was exiled. Later, a coup planned by the Parchamites and led by Karmal was discovered by the Khalqist leadership, prompting a swift reaction; a purge of Parchamites began. Parchamite ambassadors were recalled, but few returned; for instance, Karmal and Mohammad Najibullah stayed in their respective countries.

During Taraki's rule, an unpopular land reform was introduced, leading to the requisitioning of land by the government without compensation; it disrupted lines of credit and led to some crop buyers boycotting beneficiaries of the reform, causing agricultural harvests to plummet and rising discontent amongst Afghans. When Taraki realized the degree of popular dissatisfaction with the reform he began to curtail the policy. Afghanistan's long history of resistance to any type of strong centralized governmental control further undermined his authority. Consequently, much of the land reform did not get implemented nationwide. In the months following the coup, Taraki and other party leaders initiated other policies that challenged both traditional Afghan values and well-established traditional power structures in rural areas. Taraki introduced women to political life and legislated an end to forced marriage. The strength of the anti-reform backlash would ultimately lead to the Afghan Civil War.

=== Amin and the Soviet intervention: 1979 ===
While Amin and Taraki had a very close relationship at the beginning, the relationship soon deteriorated. Amin, who had helped to create a personality cult centered on Taraki, soon became disgusted with the shape it took and with Taraki, who had begun to believe in his own brilliance. Taraki began dismissing Amin's suggestions, fostering in Amin a deep sense of resentment. As their relationship turned increasingly sour, a power struggle developed between them for control of the Afghan Army. Following the 1979 Herat uprising, the Revolutionary Council and the PDPA Politburo established the Homeland Higher Defence Council. Taraki was elected its chairman, while Amin became its deputy. Amin's appointment, and the acquisition of the premiership (as Chairman of the Council of Ministers), was not a step further up the ladder as one might assume; due to constitutional reforms, Amin's new offices were more or less powerless. There was a failed assassination attempt led by the Gang of Four, which consisted of Watanjar, Sayed Mohammad Gulabzoy, Sherjan Mazdoryar and Assadullah Sarwari. This assassination attempt prompted Amin to conspire against Taraki, and when Taraki returned from a trip to Havana, he was ousted, and later suffocated on Amin's orders.

During his 104 days in power, Amin became committed to establishing a collective leadership. When Taraki was ousted, Amin promised "from now on there will be no one-man government ...". Prior to the Soviet intervention, the PDPA executed between 1,000 and 27,000 people, mostly at Pul-e-Charkhi prison. Between 17,000 and 25,000 people were arrested during Taraki's and Amin's rules combined. Amin was not liked by the Afghan people. During his rule, opposition to the communist regime increased, and the government lost control of the countryside. The state of the Afghan Armed Forces deteriorated under Amin; due to desertions the number of military personnel in the Afghan Army decreased from 100,000, in the immediate aftermath of the Saur Revolution, to somewhere between 50,000 and 70,000. Another problem was that the KGB had penetrated the PDPA, the military and the government bureaucracy. While his position in Afghanistan was becoming more perilous by the day, his enemies who were exiled in the Soviet Union and the Eastern Bloc were agitating for his removal. Babrak Karmal, the Parchamite leader, met several leading Eastern Bloc figures during this period, and Mohammad Aslam Watanjar, Sayed Mohammad Gulabzoy and Assadullah Sarwari wanted to exact revenge on Amin.

Meantime in the Soviet Union, the Special Commission of the Politburo on Afghanistan, which consisted of Yuri Andropov, Andrei Gromyko, Dmitriy Ustinov and Boris Ponomarev, wanted to end the impression that the Soviet government supported Amin's leadership and policies. Andropov fought hard for Soviet intervention, telling Leonid Brezhnev that Amin's policies had destroyed the military and the government's capability to handle the crisis by use of mass repression. The plan, according to Andropov, was to assemble a small force to intervene and remove Amin from power and replace him with Karmal. The Soviet Union declared its plan to intervene in Afghanistan on 12 December 1979, and the Soviet leadership initiated Operation Storm-333 (the first phase of the intervention) on 27 December 1979.

Amin remained trustful of the Soviet Union until the very end, despite the deterioration of official relations with the Soviet Union. When the Afghan intelligence service handed Amin a report that the Soviet Union would invade the country and topple him, Amin claimed the report was a product of imperialism. His view can be explained by the fact that the Soviet Union, after several months, decided to send troops into Afghanistan. Contrary to normal Western beliefs, Amin was informed of the Soviet decision to send troops into Afghanistan. Amin was killed by Soviet forces on 27 December 1979.

=== Karmal era: 1979–1986 ===
Karmal ascended to power following Amin's assassination. On 27 December Radio Kabul broadcast Karmal's pre-recorded speech, which stated "Today the torture machine of Amin has been smashed, his accomplices – the primitive executioners, usurpers and murderers of tens of thousand of our fellow countrymen – fathers, mothers, sisters, brothers, sons and daughters, children and old people ...". On 1 January Leonid Brezhnev, the General Secretary of the Central Committee of the Communist Party of the Soviet Union, and Alexei Kosygin, the Soviet Chairman of the Council of Ministers, congratulated Karmal on his "election" as leader, before any Afghan state or party organ had elected him to anything.

When he came to power, Karmal promised an end to executions, the establishment of democratic institutions and free elections, the creation of a constitution, the legalisation of parties other than the PDPA, and respect for individual and personal property. Prisoners incarcerated under the two previous governments would be freed in a general amnesty. He even promised that a coalition government was going to be established that was not going to espouse socialism. At the same time, he told the Afghan people that he had negotiated with the Soviet Union to give economic, military and political assistance. Even if Karmal indeed wanted all this, it would be impossible to put it into practice in the presence of the Soviet Union. Most Afghans mistrusted the government at this time. Many still remembered that Karmal had said he would protect private capital in 1978, a promise later proven to be a lie. When a political solution failed, the Afghan government and the Soviet military decided to solve the conflict militarily. The change from a political to a military solution came gradually. It began in January 1981: Karmal doubled wages for military personnel, issued several promotions, and one general and thirteen colonels were decorated. The draft age was lowered, the obligatory length of military duty was extended, and the age for reservists was increased to thirty-five years of age. In June, Assadullah Sarwari lost his seat in the PDPA Politburo, and in his place were appointed Mohammad Aslam Watanjar, a former tank commander and the then Minister of Communications, Major General Mohammad Rafi, the Minister of Defence and KHAD Chairman Mohammad Najibullah. These measures were introduced due to the collapse of the army; before the invasion the army could field 100,000 troops, after the invasion only 25,000. Desertion was pandemic, and the recruitment campaigns for young people often led them to flee to the opposition. To better organise the military, seven military zones were established, each with its own Defence Council. The Defence Council was established at the national, provincial and district level to devolve powers to the local PDPA. It is estimated that the Afghan government spent as much as 40 percent of government revenue on defence.

Karmal was forced to resign from his post as PDPA General Secretary in May 1986, due to increasing pressure from the Soviet leadership, and was succeeded by Najibullah, the former Minister of State Security. He continued to have influence in the upper echelons of the party and state until he was forced to resign from his post of Revolutionary Council Chairman in November 1986, being succeeded by Haji Mohammad Chamkani, who was not a PDPA member.

=== Najibullah and Soviet withdrawal: 1986–1989 ===
In September 1986 the National Compromise Commission (NCC) was established on the orders of Najibullah. The NCC's goal was to contact counter-revolutionaries "in order to complete the Saur Revolution in its new phase." An estimated 40,000 rebels were contacted by the government. At the end of 1986, Najibullah called for a six-month ceasefire and talks between the various opposition forces, as part of his policy of National Reconciliation. The discussions, if fruitful, would have led to the establishment of a coalition government and be the end of the PDPA's monopoly on power. The programme failed, but the government was able to recruit disillusioned mujahideen fighters as government militias. The National Reconciliation did lead an increasing number of urban dwellers to support his rule, and to the stabilisation of the Afghan defence forces.

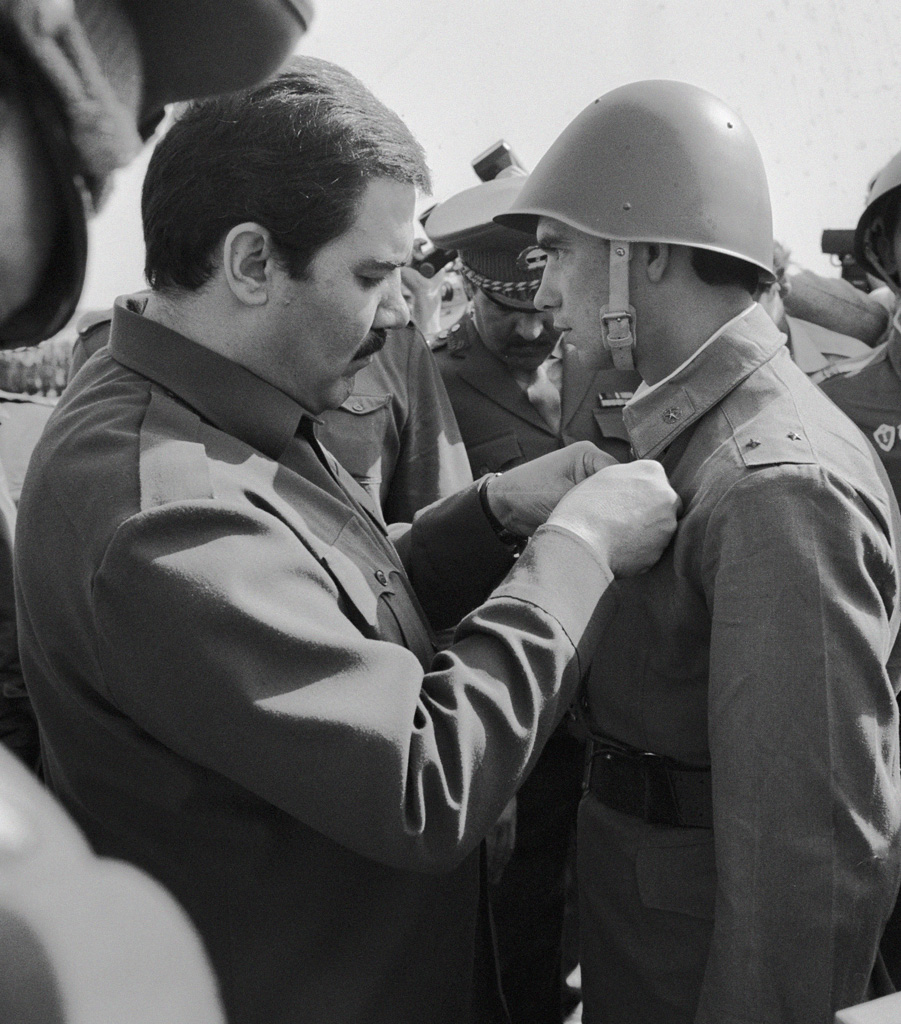
Najibullah giving a decoration to a Soviet serviceman

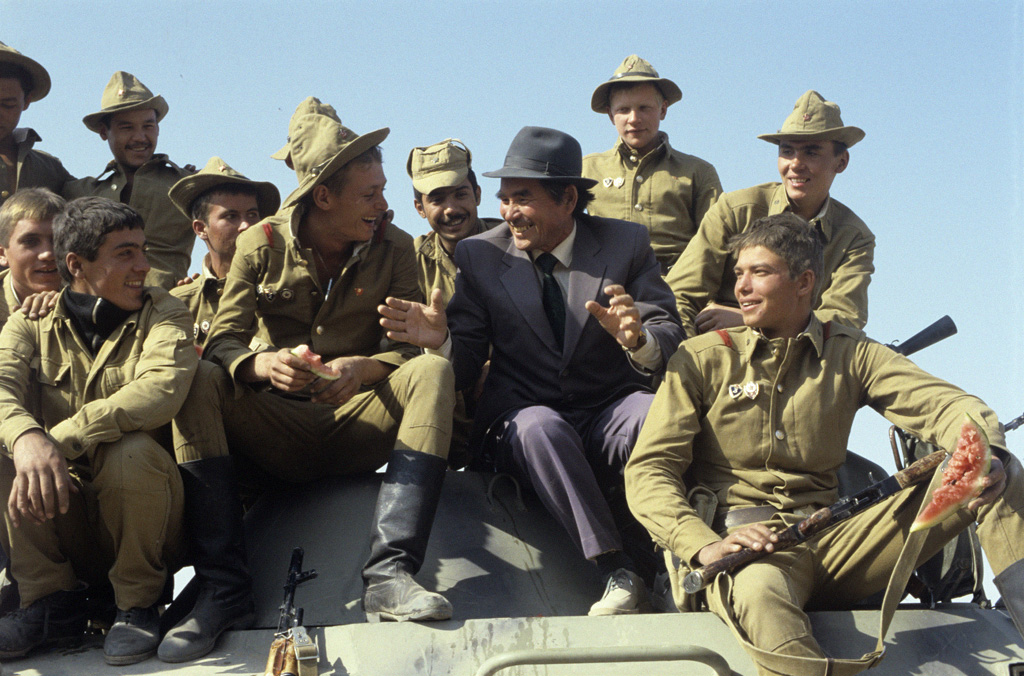
Soviet soldiers returning from Afghanistan. 20 October 1986, Kushka, Turkmenia.

While Najibullah may have been the de jure leader of Afghanistan, Soviet advisers still did most of the work after Najibullah took power. As Gorbachev remarked "We're still doing everything ourselves ... That's all our people know how to do. They've tied Najibullah hand and foot." Fikryat Tabeev, the Soviet ambassador to Afghanistan, was accused of acting like a Governor General by Gorbachev, and he was recalled from Afghanistan in July 1986. But while Gorbachev called for the end of Soviet management of Afghanistan, he could not resist doing some managing himself. At a Soviet Politburo meeting, Gorbachev said, "It's difficult to build a new building out of old material ... I hope to God that we haven't made a mistake with Najibullah." As time would prove, Najibullah's aims were the opposite of the Soviet Union's; Najibullah was opposed to a Soviet withdrawal, the Soviet Union wanted a withdrawal. This was understandable, since it was thought that the Afghan military was on the brink of dissolution. Najibullah thought his only means of survival was to retain the Soviet presence. In July 1986 six Soviet regiments, up to 15,000 troops, were withdrawn from Afghanistan. The aim of this early withdrawal was, according to Gorbachev, to show the world that the Soviet leadership was serious about leaving Afghanistan. The Soviets told the United States Government that they were planning to withdraw, but the United States Government didn't believe it. When Gorbachev met with Ronald Reagan during his visit the United States, Reagan called for the dissolution of the Afghan Military.

On 14 April the Afghan and Pakistani governments signed the 1988 Geneva Accords, and the Soviet Union and the United States signed as guarantors; the treaty specifically stated that the Soviet military had to withdraw from Afghanistan by 15 February 1989. During a Politburo meeting Eduard Shevardnadze said "We will leave the country in a deplorable situation", and talked further about economic collapse, and the need to keep at least 10,000 to 15,000 troops in Afghanistan. Vladimir Kryuchkov, the KGB Chairman, supported this position. This stance, if implemented, would be a betrayal of the Geneva Accords just signed. Najibullah was against any type of Soviet withdrawal. A few Soviet troops remained after the Soviet withdrawal; for instance, parachutists who protected the Soviet embassy staff, military advisors and special forces and reconnaissance troops still operated in the "outlying provinces", especially along the Afghan–Soviet border.

=== Fall: 1989–1992 ===
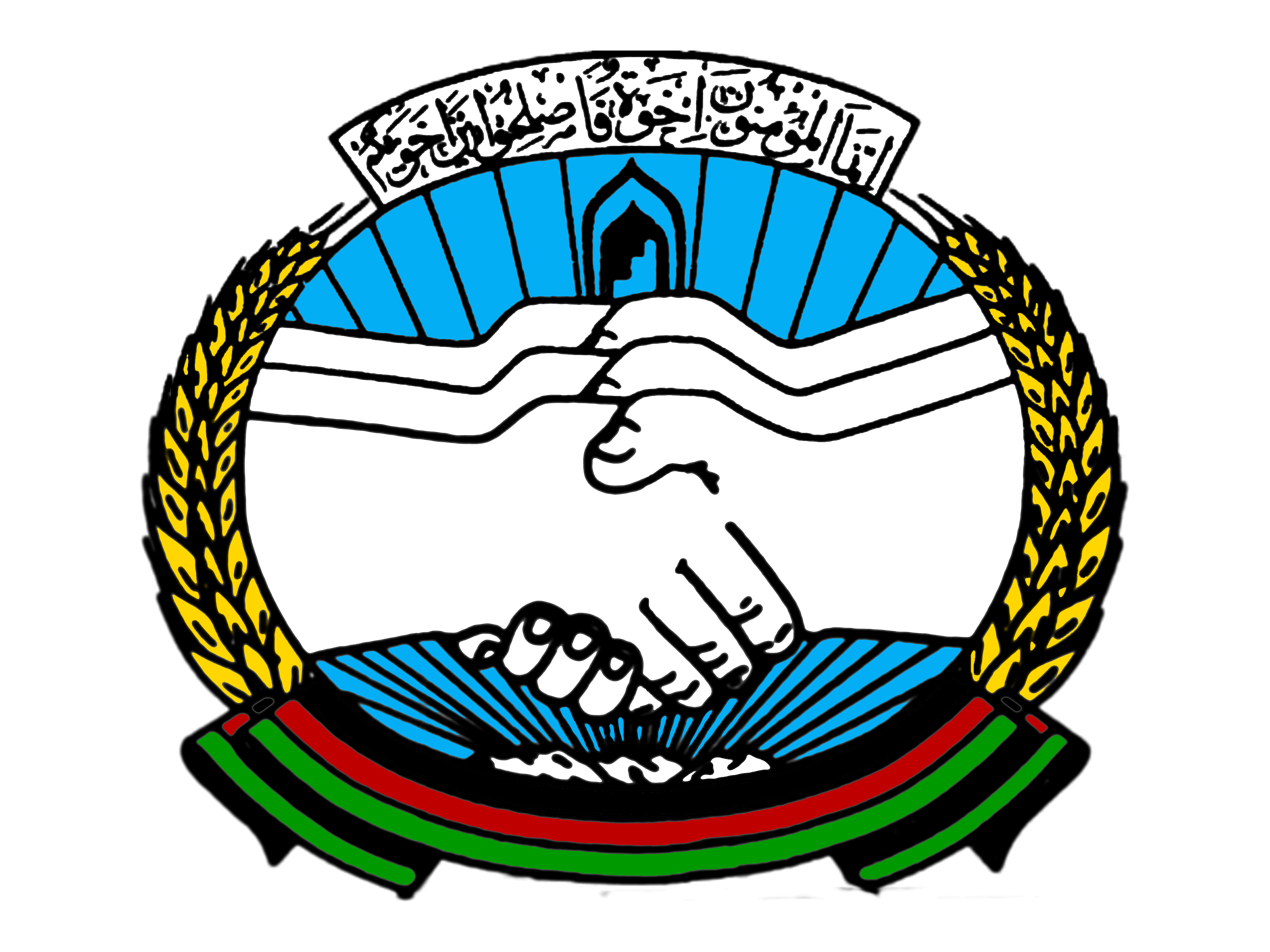
The Emblem of the Homeland Party

Pakistan, under Zia ul-Haq, continued to support the Afghan mujahideen even though it was a contravention of the Geneva Accords. At the beginning most observers expected the Najibullah government to collapse immediately, and to be replaced with an Islamic fundamentalist government. Following the Soviet withdrawal the morale of the Afghan Military was said to have actually increased. The Central Intelligence Agency stated in a report, that the new government would be ambivalent, or even worse hostile, towards the United States. Almost immediately after the Soviet withdrawal, the Battle of Jalalabad was fought between Afghan government forces and the mujahideen; the government forces, to the surprise of many, repulsed the attack and won the battle. This trend would not continue, and by the summer of 1990, the Afghan government forces were on the defensive again. By the beginning of 1991, the government controlled only 10 percent of Afghanistan, the eleven-year Siege of Khost had ended in a mujahideen victory and the morale of the Afghan military slumped. In 1991 a coup led by members of the Communist Party of the Soviet Union to remove Gorbachev failed resulting in the removal of many Soviet politicians and military officers that favored continuing aid to the Homeland Party government in Kabul. The last Soviet aid came in October, with all Russian aid being cut by the new President of the Russian Federation Boris Yeltsin in January 1992. Correctly fearing that a Mujahedeen victory could lead to the new government backing Islamists against the former Soviet Central Asian republics, Tajikistan, Uzbekistan and Turkmenistan provided food aid to the Najibullah government. The end of weapon exports however led to an inability to equip the estimated 170 thousand strong militias Najibullah set up through his reconciliation policies.

In March 1992, Najibullah offered his government's immediate resignation, and following an agreement with the United Nations (UN), his government was replaced by an interim government. In mid-April Najibullah accepted a UN plan to hand power to a seven-man council. A few days later, on 14 April, Najibullah was forced to resign by 4 of his generals, because of the loss of Bagram airbase and the town of Charikar. Abdul Rahim Hatef became acting head of state following Najibullah's resignation. Najibullah, not long before Kabul's fall, appealed to the UN for amnesty, which he was granted. But Najibullah was hindered by Abdul Rashid Dostum from escaping; instead, Najibullah sought haven in the local UN headquarters in Kabul. The war in Afghanistan did not end with Najibullah's ouster, and continued until the final fall of Kabul to the Taliban in August 2021. Kabul would suffer destruction following Najibullah's resignation as many factions fought for control.

== Politics ==
=== Political system ===
The People's Democratic Party of Afghanistan described the Saur Revolution as a democratic revolution signifying "a victory of the honourable working people of Afghanistan" and the "manifestation of the real will and interests of workers, peasants and toilers." While the idea of moving Afghanistan toward socialism was proclaimed, completing the task was seen as an arduous road. Thus, Afghanistan's foreign minister commented that Afghanistan was a democratic but not yet socialist republic, while a member of the Politburo of the People's Democratic Party of Afghanistan predicted that "Afghanistan will not see socialism in my lifetime" in an interview with a British journalist in 1981.

Afghanistan was considered by the Soviet Union as a state with a socialist orientation. The Soviets, in mid-1979, initially proclaimed Afghanistan as not merely a progressive ally, but a fully fledged member of the socialist community of nations. In contrast, later Soviet rhetoric invariably referred to the Saur Revolution as a democratic turn, but stopped short of recognizing a socialist society.

Under Hafizullah Amin, a commission working on a new constitution was established. There were 65 members of this commission, and they came from all walks of life. Due to his death, his constitution was never finished. In April 1980, under Babrak Karmal, the Fundamental Principles of the Democratic Republic of Afghanistan were made law. The constitution was devoid of any references to socialism or communism, and instead laid emphasis on independence, Islam and liberal democracy. Religion was to be respected, the exception being when religion threatened the security of society. The Fundamental Principles were, in many ways, similar to Mohammad Daoud Khan's 1977 constitution. While official ideology was de-emphasized, the PDPA did not lose its monopoly on power, and the Revolutionary Council continued to be ruled through its Presidium, the majority of Presidium members were from the PDPA Politburo. The Karmal government was "a new evolutionary phase of the great Saur Revolution." The Fundamental Principles was not implemented in practice, and it was replaced by the 1987 constitution in a loya jirga under Muhammad Najibullah but did not have support of opposition parties. Islamic principles were embedded in the 1987 constitution. For instance, Article 2 of the constitution stated that Islam was the state religion, and Article 73 stated that the head of state had to be born into a Muslim Afghan family. In 1990, the 1987 constitution was amended to state that Afghanistan was an Islamic republic, and the last references to communism were removed. Article 1 of the amended constitution said that Afghanistan was an "independent, unitary and Islamic state."

The 1987 constitution liberalized the political landscape in areas under government control. Political parties could be established as long as they opposed colonialism, imperialism, neo-colonialism, Zionism, racial discrimination, apartheid, and fascism. The Revolutionary Council was abolished, and replaced by the National Assembly of Afghanistan, a democratically elected parliament. The government announced its willingness to share power, and form a coalition government. The new parliament was bicameral, and consisted of a Senate (Sena) and a House of Representatives (Wolesi Jirga). The president was to be indirectly elected to a 7-year term. A parliamentary election was held in 1988. The PDPA won 46 seats in the House of Representatives and controlled the government with support from the National Front, which won 45 seats, and from various newly recognized left-wing parties, which had won a total of 24 seats. Although the election was boycotted by the Mujahideen, the government left 50 of the 234 seats in the House of Representatives, as well as a small number of seats in the Senate, vacant in the hope that the guerrillas would end their armed struggle and participate in the government. The only armed opposition party to make peace with the government was Hizbollah, a small Shi'a party not to be confused with the bigger party in Iran.

The Council of Ministers was the Afghan cabinet, and its chairman was the head of government. It was the most important government body in PDPA Afghanistan, and it ran the governmental ministries. The Council of Ministers was responsible to the Presidium of the Revolutionary Council, and after the adoption of the 1987 constitution, to the President and House of Representatives. There seems to have been a deliberate power-sharing between the two bodies; few Presidium members were ministers. It was the PDPA (perhaps with the involvement of the Soviets) which appointed and decided the membership of the Council of Ministers. An Afghan dissident who had previously worked in the office of the Chairman of the Council of Ministers reported that all topics up for discussion in the Council of Ministers had to be approved by the Soviets. Under Karmal, the Khalqist's were purged and replaced by the Parcham majority in the Council of Ministers. Of the 24 members of the Council of Ministers under Karmal's chairmanship, only four were Khalqists.

==== People's Democratic Party of Afghanistan ====
Emblem of the PDPA

The PDPA constitution was written during the party's First Congress in 1965. The constitution regulated all party activities and modelled itself after the Leninist party model; the party was based on the principles of democratic centralism and Marxism–Leninism was the party's official ideology. In theory, the Central Committee of the PDPA ruled Afghanistan by electing the members to the Revolutionary Council, Secretariat, and the Politburo of the People's Democratic Party of Afghanistan, the key decision-making bodies of state and party. After the Soviet intervention, the powers of the PDPA decreased because of the government's increased unpopularity amongst the masses. Soviet advisers took over nearly all aspects of Afghan administration; according to critics, the Afghans became the advisors and the Soviet became the advised. The Soviet intervention had forced Karmal upon the party and state. While trying to portray the new government as a Khalq–Parcham coalition, most members (the majority of whom were Khalqists), saw through the lies. At the time of the Parchamite takeover of the state and party, an estimated 80 percent of military officers were Khalqists.

In the party's history, only two congresses were held; the founding congress in 1965 and the Second Congress in June 1990, which transformed the PDPA into the Watan Party, which has survived to this today in the shape of the Democratic Watan Party. The Second Congress renamed the party and tried to revitalise it by admitting to past mistakes and evolving ideologically. The policy of national reconciliation was given a major ideologically role, since the party now looked for a peaceful solution to the conflict; class struggle was still emphasised. The party also decided to support and further develop the market economy in Afghanistan.

===== Factions =====
- The Khalq faction was the more militant of the two. It was more revolutionary and believed in a purer form of Marxism–Leninism than did the Parcham. Following the Soviet intervention, the Khalqi leadership of Taraki and Amin had been all but driven out. Several low and middle level functionaries were still present in the PDPA, and they still formed a majority within the armed forces; the Khalq faction still managed to create a sense of cohesion. While still believing in Marxism–Leninism, many of them were infuriated at the Soviet intervention, and the Soviets' pro-Parchamite policies. Taraki, in a speech, said "We will defend our non-aligned policy and independence with all valour. We will not give even an inch of soil to anyone and we will not be dictated in our foreign policy [nor] will we accept anybody's orders in this regard." While it was not clear, who Taraki was pointing at, the Soviet Union was the only country which Afghanistan neighbored which had the strength to occupy the country.

Flag of the PDPA

- The Parcham faction was the more moderate of the two and was steadfastly pro-Soviet. This position would hurt its popularity when it came to power following the Soviet intervention. Before the Saur Revolution, the Parcham faction had been the Soviets' favored faction. Following the Parchamites' seizure of power with Soviet assistance, party discipline was breaking down because of the Khalq–Parcham feud. After the PDPA government had ordered the replacement of seven Khalqist officers with Parchamites, the seven officers sent the intended replacements back. While the Parchamite government gave up trying to take over the armed forces, it did announce the execution of 13 officials who had worked for Amin. These executions led to three failed Khalqist coups in June, July and October 1980. The Western press, during the anti-Parchamite purge of 1979, referred to the Parcham faction as "moderate socialist intellectuals".

Throughout PDPA history there were also other factions, such as the Kar faction led by Dastagir Panjsheri, who later became a Khalqist, and Settam-e-Melli formed and led by Tahir Badakhshi. The Settam-e-Melli was a part of the insurgency against the PDPA government. In 1979, a Settam-e-Melli group killed Adolph Dubs, the United States Ambassador to Afghanistan. Ideologically Settam-e-Melli was very close to the Khalqist faction, but Settam-e-Melli opposed what they saw as the Khalq faction's "Pashtun chauvinism." Settam-e-Melli followed the ideology of Maoism. When Karmal ascended to power, the Settamites relationship with the government improved, mostly due to Karmal's former good relationship with Badakhshi, who was killed by government forces in 1979. In 1983, Bashir Baghlani, a Settam-e-Melli member, was appointed Minister of Justice.

=== National Front ===
Karmal had first mentioned the possibility of establishing a "broad national front" in March 1980, but given the situation the country was in, the campaign for the establishment of such an organisation began only in January 1981. A "spontaneous" demonstration in support of establishing such an organisation was held that month. The first pre-front institution to be established was a tribal jirga in May 1981 by the Ministry of Tribal Affairs. This jirga later became a member of the front. The National Fatherland Front (NFF) held its founding congress in June 1981, after being postponed on several occasions. The founding congress, which was planned to last four days, lasted only one. Within one month of its founding, 27 senior members had been assassinated by the mujahideen. Due to this, the organisation took time to establish itself; its first Provincial Committee was established in November, and its first jirga in December. It was not until 1983 that the NFF became an active, and important organisation. The aim of the NFF was to establish a pro-PDPA organisation for those who did not support the PDPA ideologically.

Its first leader was Salah Mohammad Zeary, a prominent politician within the PDPA. Zeary's selection had wider implications: the PDPA dominated all NFF activities. Officially, the NFF had amassed 700,000 members after its founding, which later increased to one million. The majority of its members were already members of affiliated organisations, such as the Women's Council, the Democratic Youth Organisation and the trade unions, all of which were controlled by the PDPA. The membership numbers were in any case inflated. In 1984 the NFF had 67,000 members, and in 1986 its membership peaked at 112,209. In 1985 Zeary stepped down as NFF leader, and was succeeded by Abdul Rahim Hatef, who was not a member of the PDPA. The ascension of Hatef proved more successful, and in 1985–86 the NFF succeeded in recruiting several "good Muslims". The NFF was renamed the National Front in 1987.

=== Symbols (flags and emblems) ===
The flags of Afghanistan during PDPA rule

1978–1980

1980–1987

1987–1992

The emblems of Afghanistan during PDPA rule

1978–1980

1980–1987

1987–1992

On 19 October 1978 the PDPA government introduced a new flag, a red flag with a yellow seal, and it was similar to the flags of the Soviet Central Asian republics. The new flag stirred popular resentment, as many Afghans saw it as proof of the PDPA government's attempt to introduce state atheism. It was shown to the public for the first time in an official rally in Kabul. The red flag introduced under Taraki was replaced in 1980, shortly after the Soviet intervention, to the more traditional colours black, red and green. The PDPA flag, which was red with a yellow seal, was retained to emphasise the difference between the party and state to the Afghan people. The red star, the book and communist symbols in general, were removed from the flag in 1987 under Najibullah. The new emblem, which replaced Daoud's eagle emblem, was introduced together with the flag in 1978. When Karmal introduced a new emblem in 1980, he said "it is from the pulpit that thousands of the faithful are led to the right path." The book depicted in the emblem (and the flag) was generally considered to be Das Kapital, a work by Karl Marx, and not the Quran, the central Islamic text. The last emblem was introduced in 1987 by the Najibullah government. This emblem was, in contrast to the previous ones, influenced by Islam. The Red Star and Das Kapital were removed from the emblem (and the flag). The emblem depicted the mihrab, the minbar and the shahada, an Islamic creed.

== Economy ==
Economic growth
Indicators		1978	1979	1980	1981	1982	1986	1988
Expenditure	Total (millions of Afghanis)	26,397	30,173	31,692	40,751	42,112	88,700	129,900
Expenditure	Ordinary (in percent)	47	56	62	66	69	74	84
Expenditure	Development (in percent)	53	44	38	34	31	26	16
Sources of Finances	Domestic revenue: excluding gas (in percent)	54	40	50	40	37	31	24
Sources of Finances	Sales of natural gas (in percent)	9	13	33	34	34	17	6
Sources of Finances	Foreign aid (in percent)	34	36	28	26	28	29	26
Sources of Finances	Rentier income (in percent)	43	48	61	59	62	48	32
Sources of Finances	Domestic borrowing (in percent)	4	12	−11	1	0	23	44

Taraki's Government initiated a land reform on 1 January 1979, which attempted to limit the amount of land a family could own. Those whose landholdings exceeded the limit saw their property requisitioned by the government without compensation. The Afghan leadership believed the reform would meet with popular approval among the rural population while weakening the power of the bourgeoisie. The reform was declared complete in mid-1979 and the government proclaimed that 665,000 hectares (approximately 1,632,500 acres) had been redistributed. The government also declared that only 40,000 families, or 4 percent of the population, had been negatively affected by the land reform.

Contrary to government expectations the reform was neither popular nor productive. Agricultural harvests plummeted and the reform itself led to rising discontent amongst Afghans. When Taraki realized the degree of popular dissatisfaction with the reform he quickly abandoned the policy. However, the land reform was gradually implemented under the later Karmal administration, although the proportion of land area affected by the reform is unclear.

During the civil war, and the ensuing Soviet–Afghan War, most of the country's infrastructure was destroyed, and normal patterns of economic activity were disrupted. The gross national product (GNP) fell substantially during Karmal's rule because of the conflict; trade and transport were disrupted along with the loss of labor and capital. In 1981 the Afghan GDP stood at 154.3 billion Afghan afghanis, a drop from 159,7 billion in 1978. GNP per capita decreased from 7,370 in 1978 to 6,852 in 1981. The most dominant form of economic activity was the agricultural sector. Agriculture accounted for 63 percent of gross domestic product (GDP) in 1981; 56 percent of the labour force worked in agriculture in 1982. Industry accounted for 21 percent of GDP in 1982, and employed 10 percent of the labour force. All industrial enterprises were government-owned. The service sector, the smallest of the three, accounted for 10 percent of GDP in 1981, and employed an estimated one-third of the labour force. The balance of payments, which had improved in the pre-communist administration of Mohammed Daoud Khan; the surplus decreased and became a deficit by 1982, which reached minus $US70.3 million. The only economic activity that grew substantially during Karmal's rule was export and import.

Najibullah continued Karmal's economic policies. The augmenting of links with the Eastern Bloc and the Soviet Union continued, as did bilateral trade. He also encouraged the development of the private sector in industry. The Five-Year Economic and Social Development Plan, which was introduced in January 1986, continued until March 1991, one year before the government's fall. According to the plan, the economy, which had grown less than 2 percent annually until 1985, would grow 25 percent under the plan. Industry would grow 28 percent, agriculture 14–16 percent, domestic trade by 150 percent and foreign trade by 15 percent. None of these predictions were successful, and economic growth continued at 2%. The 1990 constitution gave attention to the private sector. Article 20 covered the establishment of private firms, and Article 25 encouraged foreign investment in the private sector.

== Military ==
=== Command and officer corps ===
The military's chain of command began with the Supreme Commander, who also held the posts of PDPA General Secretary and head of state. The order of precedence continued with the Minister of National Defense, the Deputy Minister of National Defence, Chief of General Staff, Chief of Army Operations, Air and Air Defence Commander and ended with the Chief of Intelligence.

Of the 8,000 strong officer corps in 1978, between 600 and 800 were communists. An estimated 40 to 45 percent of these officers were educated in the Soviet Union, and of them, between 5 and 10 percent were members of the PDPA or communists. By the time of the Soviet intervention, the officer corps had decreased to 1,100 members. This decrease can be explained by the number of purges centered on the armed forces. The purge of the military began immediately after the PDPA took power. According to Mohammad Ayub Osmani, an officer who defected to the enemy, of the 282 Afghan officers who attended the Malinovsky Military Armored Forces Academy in Moscow, an estimated 126 were executed by the authorities. Most of the officer corps, during the Soviet war and the ensuing civil war, were new recruits. The majority of officers were Khalqists, but after the Parchamites' ascension to power, Khalqists held no position of significance. The Parchamites, who were the minority, held the positions of power. Of the 1,100 large officer corps, only an estimated 200 were party members. According to Abdul Qadir, one-fifth of military personnel were party members, which meant that, if the military stood at 47,000, 9,000 were members of the PDPA. This number was, according to J. Bruce Amtstutz, an exaggeration.

=== Branches ===
==== Army ====
Emblem of the Afghan Army from 1978 to 1979

The strength of the Afghan Army was greatly weakened during the early stages of PDPA rule. One of the main reasons for the small size was that the Soviet military were afraid the Afghan army would defect en masse to the enemy if total personnel increased. There were several sympathisers of the mujahideen within the Afghan Armed Forces. Even so, there were several elite units under the command of the Afghan army, such as the 37th, 38th, 444th, 466th, 666th, 84th, 85th Commando Brigades. Additionally, there could have also been a possible 344th Commando Brigade in 1980.

The 26th Airborne Battalion was created from the 242nd and 455th Commando Battalions after the Saur Revolution. They were deemed politically unreliable, and on 5 August 1979, they (along with soldiers from the 444th Commando Brigade) initiated a rebellion against the PDPA government, the Bala Hissar uprising. As a result of the rebellion, the 26th Airborne Battalion was transformed into the 37th Commando Brigade. The Commando Brigades were, in contrast, considered reliable and were used as mobile strike forces until they sustained excessive casualties. After sustaining these casualties, the Commando Brigades were turned into battalions. The airborne capabilities of the Afghan commando brigades would cease in 1988, during the Soviet withdrawal from Afghanistan, and the 666th Commando Brigade would be entirely decimated during the Battle of Khost in 1991.

In 1980, the DRA also introduced three special forces battalions, one for each of the army corps. The 203rd Special Purpose Battalion was tied to the 1st Central Army Corps in Kabul, the 213th Special Purpose Battalion was tied to the 2nd Army Corps in Kandahar and the 230th Special Purpose Battalion was tied to the 3rd Army Corps in Gardez.

Most soldiers were recruited for a three-year term, later extended to four-year terms in 1984. Each year, the Afghan army lost an estimated 15,000 soldiers, 10,000 from desertion and 5,000 from casualties sustained in battle. Everyone between 19 and 39 was eligible for conscription; the only exceptions were certain party members, or party members in certain tasks, Afghans who studied abroad, mostly in the Eastern Bloc and the Soviet Union, and one-child families or low earners. Unfortunately for the government, most people tried to evade conscription. So the government was forced to send army or police gangs to recruit civilians to service. Even so, some people carried fake papers so they could evade conscription. A side effect of the lack of recruits was that veterans were forced into longer service, or re-recruited. Of the 60 people who graduated from Kabul University in 1982, (few male Afghans attended Kabul University between 1980 and 1983), 15 of them fled to Pakistan or began working for the mujahideen. The army's approach to conscription was carrot-and-stick. This policy was partially successful, and each year the government managed to induce 10,000 to 18,000 into the army. A general amnesty was announced in 1980 to army draft deserters from previous administrations. In 1982, students who served in the military, and graduated 10th grade in high school, would pass 11th and 12th grade and be given a scholarship. People who were conscripted after the 12th grade, could, after military service, attend whichever higher education facility they wanted. To stop army desertions, soldiers were quickly promoted to higher ranks.

The army consisted of 14 divisions, of these 11 were infantry and another three were armored, which were part of three military corps. While an infantry division was supposed to be composed of 4,000 to 8,000 men, between 1980 and 1983 a division normally mustered between 2,000 and 2,500. The strength of armored divisions in contrast were maintained, and stood at 4,000. During the Soviet war, the Afghan army used light weapons, and used neglected equipment. During the counter-insurgency, heavy equipment, tanks and artillery were most of the time, but not always, used and fired by Soviet soldiers. A problem faced the Afghan government, and the Soviet military—the degeneration of training for new military recruits; new recruits were being rushed into service, because the Afghan government and the Soviet military feared a total collapse of the government. Western analysts expected the Afghan Army to lose the Battle of Jalalabad, but contrary to their expectations, managed to repel the Mujahideen and Pakistani forces (who had the intention of establishing an interim government in Nangarhar Province by initially blowing up the Jalalabad Dam) and maintain control of the city. In April 1990, the DRA Armed Forces further proved their ability to fight without direct Soviet assistance when they successfully assaulted a fortified complex in Paghman. The Afghan Army, spearheaded by Junbish-i-Mili, the militia led by Abdul Rashid Dostum, were able to clear mujahideen entrenchments with constant assaults and heavy bombardment from the Afghan Air Force and heavy artillery regiments that lasted until June.

Troop levels
Army	Air Force	Paramilitary	Total	As of
110,000	10,000			1978
50,000–100,000	5,000			1979
20,000–25,000				1980
25,000–35,000				1981
25,000–40,000				1982
35,000–40,000	5,000–7,000			1983
35,000–40,000				1984
35,000–40,000	7,000	50,000	87,000	1985
40,000	19,400			1986
30,000–40,000				1987
			300,000	1988
150,000		100,000	400,000	1989
		200,000	Around 515,000 (1990)	1990
			160,000	1991
(Note: The total varies, it depends if the source include militias who collaborated, but were not under the direct control of the central government. For instance, in 1991 the total militia force numbered 170,000, but the armed forces under direct control of the central government numbered 160,000.)

==== Air Force ====
As with the army, the majority of officers in the Afghan Air Force were Khalqists, but Parchamites held all the senior positions. Many in the Air Force were given education and training in the Soviet Union. The Air Force had throughout its history always been smaller than the Army. The Afghan Air Force was considered the most loyal element of the Communist regime. Following the Soviet intervention, the Soviets grounded the Air Force. Afghans were not allowed in security zones at Afghan airports by the Soviets. Afghans were generally not allowed to fly the airplanes of the Afghan Air Force, but the Soviets could. Afghan helicopters were assigned to tasks considered non-sensitive by the Soviets, and the majority of Air Force personnel were not told about missions beforehand, because the Soviets were afraid that they would contact the enemy. In Afghan helicopter flights a Soviet adviser was always present, and commanded the Afghan pilot who flew the helicopter.

Among the fixed-wing aircraft in use were MiG-17 and MiG-21 fighters, Su-7, Su-17, and Su-22 fighter-bombers, IL-28 bombers and An-2, An-24 and An-26 transport aircraft. MI-2, MI-4, MI-8, MI-24 and MI-35 helicopters were used by the Air Force. Other Soviet equipment and weapons were used by the government. The Czech L-39 jet trainers were the only non-Soviet equipment. The IL-28 bombers remained in very limited service, with their roles mostly being replaced by the Su-17 and Su-22 MiG-17s remained grounded by the end of the 1980s with the more modern MiG-21s taking on the mantle.

KhAD Emblem

==== Paramilitary and Militia forces ====
The Ministry of Interior Affairs, a Khalqist stronghold, controlled the Sarandoy, or officially, the "Defenders of the Revolution", which was a militarized Gendarmerie force. The Ministry of Tribes and Frontiers controlled, until 1983 under the jurisdiction of the Ministry of Defence, the frontier troops and the tribal militia. According to the Afghan government, the Sarandoy mustered an estimated 115,000 males at its peak. Those who worked in the Sarandoy were paid 162 dollars a month, a wage which was higher than that of Deputy Minister of National Defence before the Saur Revolution. However, the militia was less disciplined than the regular Afghan Army and were sometimes described as ruthless thugs. KhAD also had their own paramilitary forces and elite units. KhAD ran a program of creating tribal militias. Notable militias include that of General Abdul Jabar Qahraman's Helmand and Paktia militia, General Ismatullah Muslim Achakzai Kandahar Militia and General Abdul Rashid Dostum's Junbish Militia.

== Demographics ==
=== Education ===
Flag of the Democratic Youth Organization of Afghanistan

During communist rule, the PDPA government reformed the education system; education was stressed for both sexes, and widespread literacy programmes were set up. By 1988, women made up 40 percent of the doctors and 60 percent of the teachers at Kabul University; 440,000 female students were enrolled in different educational institutions and 80,000 more in literacy programs. In addition to introducing mass literacy campaigns for women and men, the PDPA agenda included: massive land reform program; the abolition of bride price; and raising the marriage age to 16 for girls and to 18 for boys.

However, the mullahs and tribal chiefs in the interiors viewed compulsory education, especially for women, as going against the grain of tradition, as anti-religious, and as a challenge to male authority. This resulted in an increase in shootings of women in Western clothes, killing of PDPA reformers in rural areas, and general harassment of women social workers. Despite improvements, a large percentage of the population remained illiterate. Beginning with the Soviet intervention in 1979, successive wars virtually destroyed the nation's education system. Most teachers fled during the wars to neighboring countries.

=== Refugees ===
Afghan refugees are Afghan nationals who have fled their country as a result of the ongoing Afghan conflict. An estimated 6 million people have fled the country, most to neighbouring Pakistan and Iran, making it the largest producer of refugees in the world. Many of these refugees would later be the basis for the Taliban movement.

== See also ==
- People's Democratic Party of Afghanistan, the Ruling party of the DRA
- Khalq, the Stalinist faction of the PDPA
- Parcham, the Islamic Socialist faction of the PDPA
- Armed Forces of the Democratic Republic of Afghanistan
- Afghan Civil War (1989–1992)
- List of Vice Presidents of Afghanistan (1978–1992)
