= National Front (Afghanistan) =

National Fatherland Front
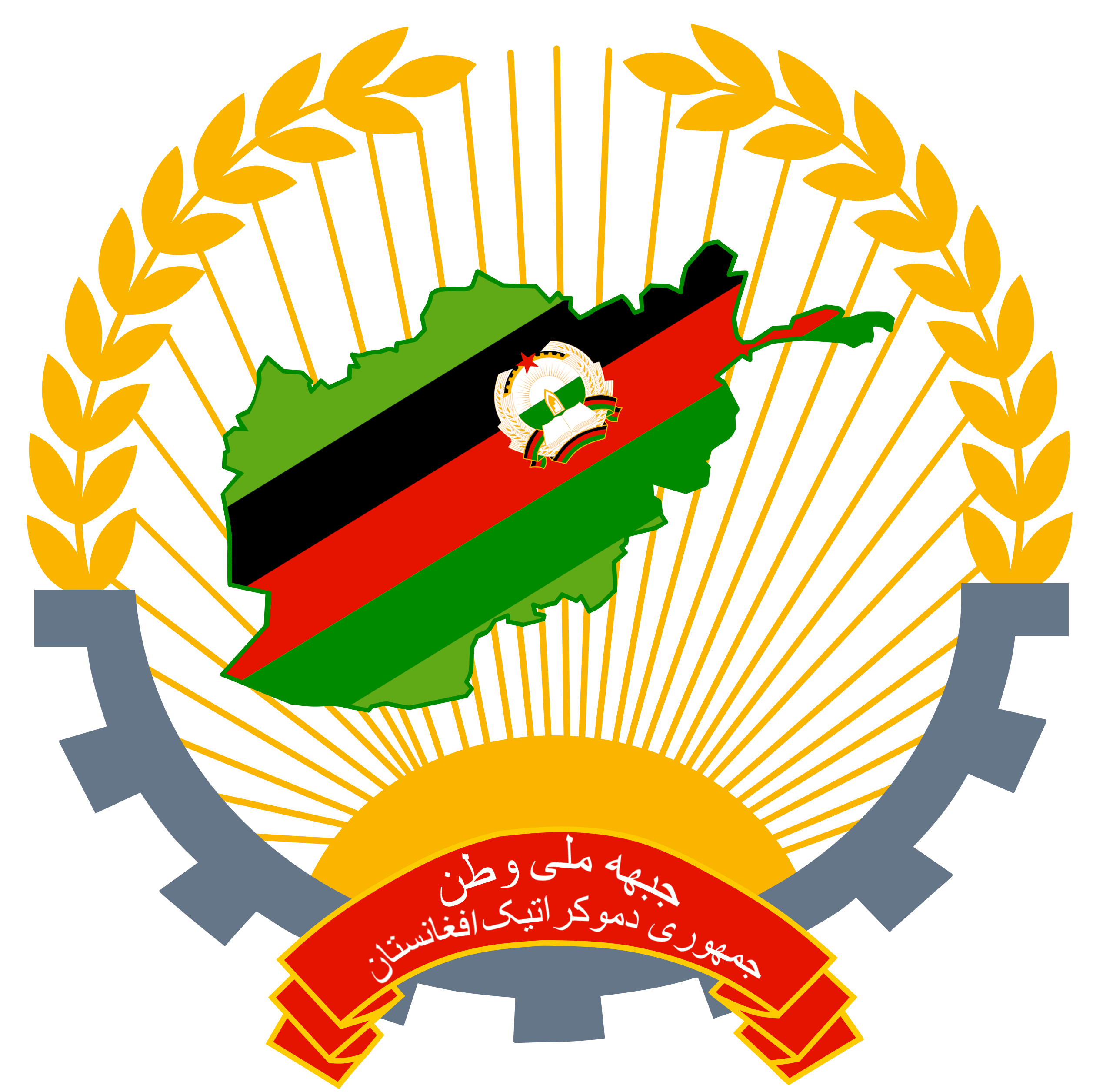
- Formation: August 1981
- Dissolved: 1992
- Type: Umbrella organization
- Headquarters: Kabul, Afghanistan
- Members: 55,000 (1984)
- Parent organization: PDPA

The National Fatherland Front (NFF; Dari: جبهه ملی پدر وطن) later known as the National Front (NF; Dari: جبهه ملی), was an umbrella organization to the People's Democratic Party of Afghanistan (PDPA) which ruled Afghanistan from 1978 until 1992. NFF was established to recruit more supporters for the communist regime in Afghanistan. Between 1980 and 1982, during Babrak Karmal's rise as president, much governmental propaganda was released for support of the organization. By April 1984, the New Times (Kabul) claimed that the NFF had over 55,000 members.

== Leaders (in 1984) ==
- Chairman of the Central Committee: Dr. Saleh Mohammad Ziarei
- Vice-Chairmen of the Central Committee: Bariq Shafihi, Suleiman Laeq, Sayed Afghani, Nejmuddin Kawyani, Sayed Ekram Paygir
