= List of Taliban insurgency leaders =

This is a list of Taliban leaders during the insurgency from 2001 to 2021.

== Supreme leaders ==
Name	Situation
Mullah Omar	The founder & spiritual leader, who lived in hiding near a U.S. base in southern Afghanistan until his death.; Died on 23 April 2013 of tuberculosis. His death was kept secret by the Taliban officials for two years until it was revealed in July 2015 by Afghanistan's National Directorate of Security.
Akhtar Mansour	Elected July 2014.; Killed in a U.S. drone strike in May 2016 in Pakistan.
Hibatullah Akhundzada	Elected May 2016 a few days after the US drone killed his predecessor.; Became the supreme leader of Afghanistan on August 15, 2021 after 2021 Taliban offensive and Fall of Kabul (2021)

== Deputies and ministers ==
Name	Position	Situation
Abdul Ghani Baradar	Governor of Herat and Nimruz Province	One of the founders of the Taliban along with Omar; Said to be the Deputy leader of the Taliban; Captured by Pakistani forces in 2010 and released at the request of the United States government in 2018
Obaidullah Akhund	Minister of Defense	Senior leader; Captured by Pakistani forces late February 2007 and died of heart disease in a Pakistan prison in 2010
Wakil Ahmed Muttawakil	Foreign Minister	The last Foreign Minister in the Taliban government of the Islamic Emirate of Afghanistan.; Surrendered to Northern Alliance troops in Kandahar, 2001
Abdul Rahman Zahed	Deputy Minister of Foreign Affairs	Allegedly created an impression that he entered Pakistan after the U.S. invasion of Afghanistan, but had returned before the end of 2001 to his home village in Loghar province; at large; Reported to be a leader in the Taliban's Quetta Shura; Reported captured in late February 2010
Mohammad Hassan Akhund	First Deputy Council of Ministers	At large; spoke to Reuters by satellite telephone from an undisclosed location on May 4, 2003; Reported to be a leader in the Taliban's Quetta Shura.; Reported captured in late February 2010.
Mohammad Nabi Omari	Minister of Communications	Was the Taliban's chief of communications; Listed as a member of the Taliban leadership.
Abdul Razaq	Commerce Minister	Afghan forces captured Razaq while scouring a rugged mountainous region north of Kandahar, April 1, 2003. Razaq's son, Abdul, had been killed on September 5, 2002 as he tried to shoot President Hamid Karzai. Abdul Razaq testified he had merely started out as a civilian, conscripted into Afghanistan's civil service by the Pakistan who was promoted to Commerce Minister, without ever becoming a member of the Taliban. He testified he had taken advantage of an amnesty Karzai offered when the Taliban fell, and had not been involved in politics since the fall of the Taliban.
Khaksar Akhund	Deputy Minister of Interior Affairs	Staged a public press conference in Kabul, late November, 2001 and denounced the Taliban; by August 2002, he supports the U.S.-backed Afghan government of Hamid Karzai; Assassinated by Taliban in 2006.
Qari Ahmadullah	Minister of Security (Intelligence)	Supposedly killed in late December 2001 by a United States bombing raid in the Paktia province.; 12 years after the incident, an investigation by Harper's Weekly alleged that Ahmadullah is alive.
Abdul Haq Wasiq	Deputy Minister of Intelligence	Served as Deputy Minister of Intelligence in the Taliban Intelligence Service.; Served as acting Minister of Intelligence when Qari Ahmadullah was away from Kabul performing his duties as governor of Tahar province.; Arrived at the Guantanamo detention camps on January 11, 2002, and he was held there until 31 May 2014.
Nooruddin Turabi	Minister of Justice	Allegedly sheltered in Quetta by Pakistani officials by the end of 2001; captured by United States forces and then set free and given general amnesty in early January 2002
Amir Khan Muttaqi	Minister of Culture & Information	Allegedly moved to Peshawar, Pakistan before the end of 2001 and still "hiding out in the Pakistani frontier" March 19, 2002;
Ghausuddin		Killed in a gun battle in Zabul province, May 27, 2003
Abbas Akhund	Minister of Health	In February 2002, he was "hiding with his military force about 5 miles from Uruzgan village"; at large
Abdul Raqib	First Deputy Council of Ministers	Unknown (is he the same Abdul Raqib as the official from the agriculture department in 2003?)

== Governors ==
Governors
Name	Position	Situation
Abdul Kabir	Governor of Nangarhar Province	Head of Eastern Zone; (also see above); Allegedly moved to Peshawar, Pakistan before the end of 2001; Reported to be a leader of the Taliban's Quetta Shura.; Reported captured February 20, 2010, in Nowshehra. Later released.
Khairullah Khairkhwa	Governor of Herat Province and Minister of the Interior	One of the original Taliban members who launched the movement in 1994.; Former Governor of Herat Province; He was directly associated with Taliban Supreme Commander Omar.
Norullah Noori	Governor of Balkh Province	Head of Northern Zone; Former Governor of Balkh Province.; In December 2001, he was captured and known to be in Mazar-I Sharif in the custody of Afghan Northern Alliance commander Gen. Abdul Rashid Dostum; Has been held in Guantanamo since its opening.; Guantanamo analysts alleged he had been the chief bodyguard for the "Governor of Mazari Sharif" [sic], and had served as the acting governor in his absence.
Na'im Kucki	Governor of Bamyan Province	A tribal leader of the Kuchi people.; Former Minister of Tribal Affairs.; Held in Guantanamo for several years.
Ahmad Jan	Governor of Zabul Province	Sanctioned by the United Nations in 2000.; Reported to be a leader in the Taliban's Quetta Shura.; Reported captured in late February 2010.
Mohammad Hasan Rahmani	Governor of Kandahar Province	Reported to be a leader in the Taliban's Quetta Shura.; Reported captured in late February 2010.
Mir Muhammad	Shadow Governor of Baghlan Province in 2010	Reported to be a leader in the Taliban's Quetta Shura.; Reported captured in late February 2010.
Abdul Salam	Shadow Governor of Kunduz Province in 2010	Reported to be a leader in the Taliban's Quetta Shura.; Reported captured in late February 2010.
Abdul Salaam Alizai	Governor of Oruzgan Province in the 1990s	Defected to the government in December 2007.

== Other high-ranking officials, ambassadors and envoys abroad ==
Name	Position	Situation
Abdul Salam Zaeef	Ambassador to Pakistan	He was the Afghan ambassador to Pakistan before the US invasion of Afghanistan.; Detained in Pakistan in the fall of 2001 and held in Guantanamo Bay until 2005
Sayed Rahmatullah Hashemi	Envoy to United States	Admitted to Yale as a non degree student in 2005
Abdul Hakim Mujahid	Envoy to the United Nations	Arrived in Pakistan in early December 2001
Hammdidullah, aka Janat Gul	Head of Ariana Afghan Airlines	Surrendered November 24, 2001 east of Konduz. Status later established by a Combatant Status Review Tribunal as "no longer enemy combatant" and released.

== Field commanders ==
Name	Position	Situation
Mohammad Fazl	Chief of Staff	He was the former Taliban Deputy Defense Minister; Held at Guantanamo Bay from 11 January 2002 until 31 May 2014.
Dadullah	Senior Military Commander	Escaped from the siege of Kunduz in November 2001 and reached Kandahar. Took part in the evacuation of Kandahar, then may have returned to his native town Kajai in Helmand province. Allegedly participated (by giving orders via cell phone) in the murder of Ricardo Munguia on March 27, 2003.; He was nicknamed by the anti-Taliban resistance before the Taliban government fell as The Lame because of a leg he had lost during fighting.; One of the most effective commanders in the resistance, he has been linked to massacres of Shi'a, the scorched earth policy of Shi'a villages in 2001 (about which he once boasted on the radio), the summary execution of men suspected of throwing hand grenades into his compound in 2001 (they were hanged at one of the main roundabouts), and suicide bombings.; Killed on May 13, 2007.
Jalaluddin Haqqani	Military leader	First mujahideen commander to capture a city, Khost, from the government of Kabul, in 1991.; Didn't ally with the Taliban until after their capture of Kabul in 1995.; Hamid Karzai asked him to serve as Prime Minister, in an attempt to split off the Taliban's moderate wing.; His death from disease was announced 3 September 2018.
Abdul Razaq Nafez	Field commander	Released by Abdul Rashid Dostam in November 2001 after fighting near Kunduz and disappeared after fleeing to Kandahar
Shahzada	Provincial commander	A commander prior to the U.S. invasion, he was captured after the defeat of the Taliban and was interred in Guantanamo. He managed to convince authorities he was instead a civilian detained in error, and was released in 2003. He returned to fighting and was killed in 2004.
Dawran Safi	Field commander	Taliban field commander operating in Kunar Province.; In October 2009, Pål Refsdal made a film on the daily life of the Taliban and the daily lives of Taliban insurgents in Afghanistan. This film showed the family of Dawran Safi, including his wife and children.; Killed in a U.S airstrike on 23 October 2013, while his wife and two children were killed in earlier airstrikes including other civilians.
Gul Mohammed Jangvi	Field commander	On July 19, 2006 explained the Taliban's unexpected withdrawal from Helmand.
Akhtar Mohammad Osmani	Field commander	Killed in U.S. airstrike in December 2006.
Abdul Zahir	Group commander	Killed in the U.S. airstrike that killed Osmani in December 2006.
Mufti Nemat	Field commander	Important Taliban leader in northern Afghanistan, particularly Jowzjan Province, who was later expelled from the movement, defecting to the Afghan government, and then to Islamic State's Khorasan Province (ISIL-K).
Sheikh Ilyas Khel	Commander	Captured in Pakistan as of August 2, 2007.

== See also ==
- Quetta Shura
