= Forward Operating Base Sharana =

Former United States military base

FOB Sharana
- Sharana, Paktika Province in Afghanistan
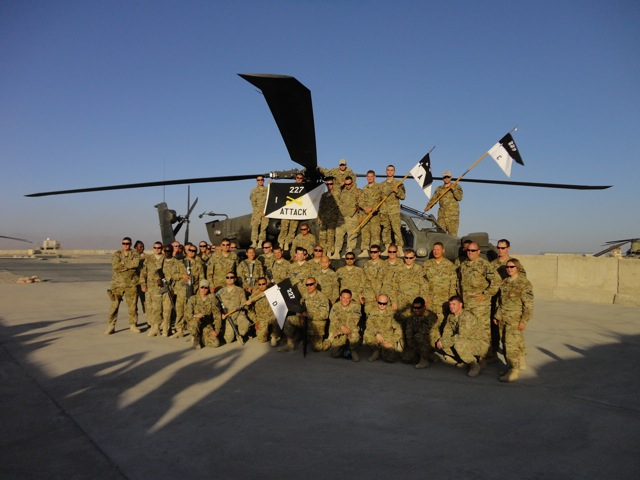

Site information
- Type: Forward operating base
- Owner: International Security Assistance Force (ISAF)
- Operator: United States Armed Forces

Location
- Shown within Afghanistan
- Coordinates: 33°07′44″N 68°50′21″E

Site history
- Built: 2005
- In use: 2004-2013

Airfield information
- Identifiers: IATA: OAS, ICAO: OASA
- Elevation: 2,237 metres (7,339 ft) AMSL
Runways
Direction	Length and surface
14/32	1300m Asphalt

Forward Operating Base (FOB) Sharana was a large forward operating base with many amenities, including a United Service Organizations installation. It is located in Paktika Province, Afghanistan.

FOB Sharana was initially established as Camp Kearney on 21 November 2004. This was followed by the construction of an airstrip and helicopter landing zone. It was completed in 2005 and the name officially changed to Forward Operating Base (FOB) Sharana. The perimeter of the FOB grew steadily through 2007. It was a hub to many NGO construction projects and vocational training programs that went on in Paktika Province as well as hosting ISAF units from other nations such as South Korea, Poland and Czech Republic.

The FOB was constructed on a prominent rise overlooking Route Audi. Additionally OP Mest near the village of Yahya Kheyl at the entrance of the valley was built. This observation post maintained a full-time garrison to provide additional security and overwatch for the FOB.

Opening on 1 March 2011, The SPC Jordan Byrd Trauma Center provided combat medical services for the region. The center was named in honor of Specialist Jordan Byrd, a Task Force Red Currahee medic from Company A, 1st Battalion, 506th Infantry Regiment, 4th Brigade Combat Team, 101st Airborne Division, who had died at OP Mest the previous October while saving another soldier.

In May 2013 Security Force (SECFOR) 240B, consisting of Jordanian military volunteers, assumed security duties for the FOB as American forces began to draw down. The FOB was dismantled and returned to the Afghan Government on 1 October 2013. The site is now the location of Sharana public airfield.

== Units ==
- May 2004 to May 2005 - B Company, 1st Battalion, 168th Infantry Regiment, 34th Infantry Division in support of Combined/Joint Task Force 168
- March 2006 to March 2007 - 37th Engineer Battalion (Combat)(Airborne) in support of Combined/Joint Task Force 76, 10th Mountain Division (Light Infantry) and formed Task Force Eagle
- Headquarters and Headquarters Company, 36th Engineer Brigade (TF Rugged) March 2007 to June 2008
- ISAF Provincial Reconstruction Team 4 (PRT SHARANA) (United States Army/Navy Joint Task Force CJTF82/TF Pacemaker) March 2007 to April 2008
- ISAF Provincial Reconstruction Team (PRT PAKTIKA) (United States Army/Navy Joint Task Force CJTF101) November 2008 to July 2009
- ISAF SECFOR - A Company 158th Infantry Regiment 29th Infantry Brigade Combat Team (CJTF82/Task Force Pacemaker) March 2007 to April 2008
- 62nd Engineer Battalion (H), 36th Engineer Brigade (Task Force Hammer) April 2008 to July 2009
- 166th Engineer Company, 877th Engineer Battalion, Alabama Army National Guard May 2009 to June 2010
- 226th Engineer Company, 891st Engineer Battalion, Kansas Army National Guard, January–December 2010
- 1092nd Engineer Battalion, 372nd Engineer Brigade WV ARNG, May 2010 to May 2011
- 506th Infantry Regiment(Currahee) 101st Airborne Division Aug 2010 to Aug 2011
- 172nd Infantry Brigade (United States Army) July 2011 to June 2012
- 887th Engineer Support Company, 326th Engineer Battalion October 2011 to October 2012
- 842nd Engineer Company, 109th Engineer Battalion, Nov 2011 to September 2012
- 307th Brigade Support Battalion, 82nd Airborne Division (United States)
- 4th Infantry Brigade Combat Team, 1st Infantry Division (United States) May 2012 to February 2013
- 2nd Brigade Combat Team, 10th Mountain Division (United States) January 2013 to October 2013

Aviation

- 655 Air Expeditionary Squadron, May 2009 to December 2010, Commander Lt. Col. Melinda Grafton, USAF
- 1st Battalion, 227th Aviation Regiment, May 2011 to May 2012

== See also ==
- List of ISAF installations in Afghanistan
- Bowe Bergdahl: US Army soldier who deserted from OP Mest and attempted to reach FOB Sharana
