= Khairullah Khairkhwa =

Information Minister of Afghanistan since 2021

Mullah Khairullah Khairkhwa خیرالله خیرخواه
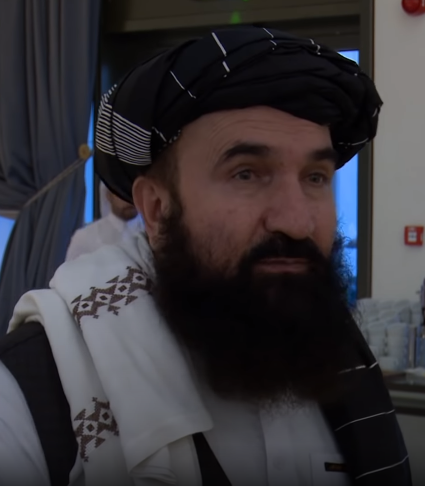
- Khairkhwa in 2020

Governor of Wardak
- Incumbent
- Assumed office 1 September 2025
- Supreme Leader: Hibatullah Akhundzada
- Prime Minister: Hasan Akhund

Minister of Information and Culture
- In office 7 September 2021 – 1 September 2025 (Note: Acting: 7 September 2021 – 15 August 2025)
- Prime Minister: Hasan Akhund (acting)
- Supreme Leader: Hibatullah Akhundzada
- Succeeded by: Sheikh Shir Ahmad Haqqani

Minister of Interior Affairs
- In office c. 1997–c. 1998
- Prime Minister: Mohammad Rabbani
- Leader: Mohammed Omar
- Preceded by: Qari Ahmadullah
- Succeeded by: Abdur Razzaq Akhundzada

Governor of Herat
- In office March 2001 – October 2001
- Prime Minister: Mohammad Rabbani
- Leader: Mohammed Omar

Spokesperson for the Islamic Emirate of Afghanistan
- In office c. 1995–c. 1996
- Prime Minister: Mohammad Rabbani; Abdul Kabir
- Leader: Mohammed Omar

Personal details
- Born: 1967 (age 58–59) Kandahar, Kingdom of Afghanistan
- Party: Taliban
- Occupation: Politician, Taliban member

Khairullah Said Wali Khairkhwa (Pashto: خیرالله سید ولي خیرخواه [xairʊˈlɑ saˈjɪd waˈli xairˈxwɑ]; born 1967) is a member of the militant Taliban organization currently in control of Afghanistan, who has previously been called one of the "moderate" Taliban. He is the Governor of Maidan Wardak Province. He has previously served as Taliban Minister of Information and Culture and Minister of the Interior. After the fall of the Taliban government in 2001, he was held at the United States Guantanamo Bay detainment camp in Cuba for 12 years. He was released in late May 2014 in a prisoner exchange that involved Bowe Bergdahl and the Taliban five. Press reports have referred to him as "Mullah" and "Maulavi", two different honorifics for referring to senior Muslim clerics.

Claims from analysts at Guantanamo that Khairkhwa was directly associated with Osama bin Laden and Taliban Supreme Commander Mullah Muhammad Omar have been widely repeated. Kate Clark has criticized her fellow journalists for uncritically repeating U.S. claims that were largely based on unsubstantiated rumor and innuendo, or on confessions and denunciations coerced through torture and other extreme interrogation techniques.

== Early life ==
American intelligence analysts estimate that Khairkhwa was born in 1967 in Kandahar, Afghanistan. He is from the Arghistan District in Kandahar province and belongs to the Popalzai tribe. He studied at the Darul Uloom Haqqania Islamic seminary (darul uloom or madrasa) at Akora Khattak in Pakistan, where many other Taliban leaders also studied. He was affiliated with Mohammad Nabi Mohammadi's Islamic Revolution Movement (Harakat-i-Inqilab-i-Islami) during the Soviet–Afghan War.

Khairullah was one of the original members of the Taliban in 1994 and was a spokesman for them from 1994 to 1996. He was chief of police after the Taliban took control of Kabul in 1996. He was the Minister of the Interior under Taliban rule in 1997 and 1998, with Abdul Samad Khaksar, also called Mohammad Khaksar, as deputy minister.

Some reports have said he had been the Taliban's deputy minister of the interior, interim minister of the interior, the minister of the interior, and the Minister of Information. Khirullah was also to serve as the Taliban's Minister of Foreign Affairs spokesman, giving interviews to the British Broadcasting Corporation and the Voice of America. He was the Governor of Herat Province from 1999 to 2001.

Kate Clark, then of the BBC News, interviewed Khairkhwa in September 2000. Clark wrote that Khairkhwa was comfortable conversing in the Dari language when most Taliban leaders, all members of Afghanistan's Pashtun ethnic group, would only speak in the Pashtun language. She wrote that under Khairkhwa, she was allowed to film openly in Herat, even though doing so was disallowed under Taliban law. She wrote that under Khairkhwa, Afghan women felt comfortable approaching her, and speaking with her, something that rarely happened in other regions of Afghanistan.

According to journalist Mark Mazzetti, in February 2002, Khairkhwa and alleged CIA agent Ahmed Wali Karzai discussed the possibility of Khairkhwa surrendering and informing for the CIA. However, the deal broke down and Khairkhwa fled for Pakistan; the CIA learned of his flight through a communications intercept and the U.S. military dispatched a helicopter-borne commando team to capture Khairkhwa. However, the CIA hoped to allow the Pakistanis to recruit or capture Khairkhwa, which would also boost U.S.-Pakistan relations. Thus, the CIA recalled the drone following Khairkhwa's truck and a second drone pinpointed a different truck, whose innocent occupants were captured and later released. Khairkhwa successfully crossed into Pakistan at Spin Boldak, but after further talks over informing broke down, Khairkhwa was arrested by the Pakistanis in Chaman, transferred to the CIA in Quetta, and then sent to Guantanamo.

== Guantanamo Bay internment ==
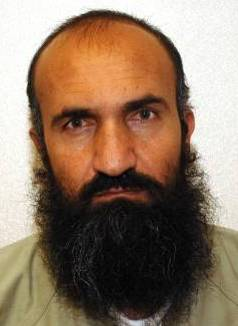
Khairullah Khairkhwa while detained at Guantanamo Bay

Khirullah Khairkhwa arrived at the United States Guantanamo Bay detainment camp in Cuba on May 1, 2002.

=== Official status reviews ===
Originally, the Bush Presidency asserted that captives apprehended in the "war on terror" were not covered by the Geneva Conventions and could be held indefinitely without charge and without an open and transparent review of the justifications for their detention. In 2004, the United States Supreme Court ruled, in Rasul v. Bush, that Guantanamo captives were entitled to being informed of the allegations justifying their detention and were entitled to try to refute them. Following the ruling, the Department of Defense set up the Office for the Administrative Review of Detained Enemy Combatants (OARDEC) in 2004.

Combatant Status Review Tribunals were held in a 3x5 meter trailer where the captive sat with his hands and feet shackled to a bolt in the floor.

Scholars at the Brookings Institution, led by Benjamin Wittes, listed the captives still held in Guantanamo in December 2008, according to whether their detention was justified by certain common allegations. Khirullah Said Wali Khairkhwa was listed as one of the captives who:

- the military alleges were members of either al Qaeda or the Taliban and associated with the other group.
- "The military alleges ... fought for the Taliban."
- was a member of the Taliban leadership.
- was one of "36 [who] openly admit either membership or significant association with Al Qaeda, the Taliban, or some other group the government considers militarily hostile to the United States."
- had admitted "being [a] Taliban leader."

On January 21, 2009, the day he was inaugurated, United States President Barack Obama issued three Executive orders related to the detention of individuals in Guantanamo. He put in place a new review system composed of officials from six departments, where the OARDEC reviews were conducted entirely by the Department of Defense. When it reported back a year later, the Joint Review Task Force classified some individuals as too dangerous to be transferred from Guantanamo. On April 9, 2013, that document was made public after a Freedom of Information Act request. Khairullah Khairkhwa was one of the 71 individuals deemed too innocent to charge but too dangerous to release. Obama said those in that category would start to receive reviews from a Periodic Review Board. The first review was not convened until November 20, 2013.

=== Release ===
The Afghanistan High Peace Council called for his release in 2011. In early 2011, President Hamid Karzai demanded his release and Hekmat Karzai, the director of the Centre for Conflict and Peace Studies in Kabul, said "His release will be influential to the peace process," and that "Mr Khairkhwa is well respected amongst the Taliban and was considered a moderate by those who knew him".

Throughout the fall of 2011 and the winter of 2012, the United States conducted peace negotiations with the Taliban and widely leaked that a key sticking point was the ongoing detention of Khairkhwa and four other senior Taliban, Norullah Noori, Mohammed Fazl, Abdul Haq Wasiq – the Taliban Five. Negotiations hinged on a proposal to send the five men directly to Doha, Qatar, where they would be allowed to set up an official office for the Taliban.

In March 2012, it was reported that Ibrahim Spinzada, described as "Karzai's top aide", had spoken with the five men in Guantanamo earlier that month and had secured their agreement to be transferred to Qatar. Karzai, who had initially opposed the transfer, then reportedly backed the plan.

The Taliban Five were flown to Qatar and released on June 1, 2014. Simultaneously, U.S. soldier and deserter Bowe Bergdahl was released in eastern Afghanistan. The Taliban Five were required to spend the next year in Qatar, a condition of their release. They are the only "forever prisoners" to be released without being cleared by a review by the Periodic Review Board.

== 2021 Taliban government ==
On September 7, 2021, Khairkhwa was named the new Minister of Information and Culture for the interim government. On September 1, 2025, he was removed from this position and appointed as Governor of Maidan Wardak Province.
