= Qari Abdullah =

Senior Taliban Leader & Spokesman

- Died: March 2, 2017
- Occupation: Politician
- Known for: Taliban leader

Qari Abdullah (died March 2, 2017) was a long term senior Taliban leader, and spokesman. He played a key role in the negotiation that lead to the 2014 release of Bowe Bergdahl, a US soldier who had been held by the Taliban for years.

Abdullah was part of the Haqqani Network, a powerful branch of the Taliban.

In 2010 Qari Abdullah was identified as the Taliban leader responsible for recruiting and training child soldiers. He was reported to have been a former child soldier himself.

On March 12, 2015, Punjab authorities listed Abdullah on their list of most wanted terrorists.

On March 3, 2017, a Department of Defense spokesmen reported he had been killed in a drone strike in Khost Province.
