= Fazil =

Fazil may refer to:

== Given name ==
- Fazil (director) (born 1953), Indian filmmaker, producer and screenwriter
- Köprülü Fazıl Ahmed Pasha (1635–1676), Ottoman grand vizier
- Necip Fazıl Kısakürek (1904–1983), Turkish poet and activist
- Fazıl Hüsnü Dağlarca (1914–2008), prolific Turkish poet
- Fazil Iravani (1782–1885), second Sheikh ul-Islam of the Caucasus
- Fazil Iskander (1929–2016), Abkhaz writer
- Fazil Kaggwa (born 1995), Ugandan boxer
- Fazıl Küçük (1906–1984), Turkish Cypriot Vice President of the Republic of Cyprus
- Fazil Mammadov (born 1964), Azerbaijani politician
- Fazil Marija (born 1985), Sri Lankan rugby union player
- Fazil Mustafa (born 1965), Azerbaijani politician
- Fazıl Önder (1926–1958), Turkish Cypriot journalist
- Fazil Rahu (1935–1987), Pakistani politician
- Fazıl Say (born 1970), Turkish pianist and composer

== Surname ==
- Art Fazil, Singaporean musician
- Enderûnlu Fâzıl (1757–1810), Ottoman poet
- Irfan Fazil (born 1981), Pakistani cricketer
- Princess Nazli Fazil (1853–1913), Egyptian princess
- Fahadh Faasil (born 1982), Indian actor and film producer

== Other uses ==
- Fazıl, village and municipality in the Shaki Rayon of Azerbaijan
- Fazil (film), a 1928 silent film with Charles Farrell directed by Howard Hawks
- Fazil (village), village in Pakistan

== See also ==
- Fasil (disambiguation)
- Fazl, Arabic naming element
- Mohammad Fazl (born 1967), Afghan extrajudicial prisoner of the United States
- Fozil (given name)
