= Noorullah Noori =

Afghan Borders and Tribal Affairs Minister since 2021

Mullah Noorullah Noori نورالله نوری
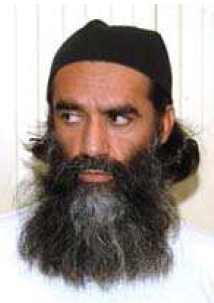
- Noori while detained at Guantanamo Bay

Minister of Borders and Tribal Affairs
- Incumbent
- Assumed office 7 September 2021 (Note: Acting: 7 September 2021 – 15 August 2025)
- Prime Minister: Mohammad Hassan Akhund
- Leader: Hibatullah Akhundzada
- Preceded by: Abdul Karim Brahui

Governor of Balkh
- In office October 2000 – December 2001
- Prime Minister: Mohammad Rabbani
- Leader: Mohammed Omar
- Succeeded by: Maulvi Qudratullah (2021)

Personal details
- Born: 1967 (age 58–59) Shajoie, Afghanistan
- Party: Taliban
- Occupation: Politician, Taliban member

Military service
- Allegiance: Islamic Emirate of Afghanistan
- Branch/service: Islamic Army of Afghanistan
- Years of service: 1994-2001
- Battles/wars: Afghan civil war War in Afghanistan

Mullah Noorullah Noori (Pashto: نورالله نوري [nʊrʊˈlɑ nʊˈri]; born 1967) is a militant and Minister of Borders and Tribal Affairs of the Islamic Emirate of Afghanistan since 7 September 2021. He was also the Taliban's Governor of Balkh Province during their first rule (1996–2001). Noori spent more than 12 years in the United States's Guantanamo Bay detention camps, in Cuba. Noori was released from the detention camp on May 31, 2014, along with the other four members of the so-called Taliban Five—Khairullah Khairkhwa, Abdul Haq Wasiq, Mullah Mohammad Fazl, and Mohammad Nabi Omari in a prisoner exchange that involved Bowe Bergdahl, and flown to Qatar.

2001 press reports describe General Rashid Dostum bringing Noori with him when he toured the ruins of the Qala-i-Jangi fortress, after over 400 captives died there in what is usually described as a failed prison uprising. Noori was reported to have ordered the Taliban fighters in his jurisdiction to peacefully surrender to Dostum's Northern Alliance forces.

Noori arrived at Guantanamo on January 11, 2002, and was held there for 12 years. The allegations used to justify his detention in Guantanamo asserted he was an interim Provincial Governor of Jalalabad, temporary governor of Mazar-i-Sharif and Governor of Balkh Province. Noorullah has been listed by the United Nations 1267 Committee since January 25, 2001.

Throughout the fall of 2011 and the winter of 2012, the United States conducted peace negotiations with the Taliban and widely leaked was that a key sticking point was the ongoing detention of Noorullah and four other senior Taliban. Negotiations hinged on a proposal to send the five men directly to Doha, Qatar, where they would be allowed to set up an official office for the Taliban.

== Governor under the Taliban ==
Farida Kuchi, a Kuchi nomad tribeswoman who ran as a candidate for the Wolesi Jirga in 2005, described her delivery of a list of 1000 Kuchi stranded in an impromptu refugee camp to then Governor of Balkh Noori as the beginning of her political activism in 1998. Fareeda told Carlotta Gall, of the New York Times that Noori accepted her list, and forwarded to humanitarian agencies, and aid did arrive.

In the fall of 2001, when the United States, allied with the Northern Alliance and other anti-Taliban forces, started to use military force to seek out al Qaeda, Noori was one Taliban leader who is reported to have directed the Taliban fighters in his province to lay down their weapons and surrender.

In December 2001, shortly after the overthrow of the Taliban, Human Rights Watch called for a human rights tribunal to be convened against Noorullah and two other former Taliban Governors of Northern Provinces to investigate claims they had been responsible for alleged massacres of Hazara and Uzbek civilians. The reports of civilian massacres were alleged to have occurred during the previous three years (1998-2001). The two other Taliban leaders were Mullah Dadullah and Mullah Mohammed Fazil. Fazil, like Noorullah, had already surrendered and would be sent to Guantanamo.

== Held aboard the USS Bataan ==
Former Taliban Ambassador to Pakistan Abdul Salam Zaeef described being flown to the United States Navy's amphibious warfare vessel, the USS Bataan, for special interrogation. Zaeef wrote that the cells were located six decks down, were only 1 meter by 2 meters. He wrote that the captives weren't allowed to speak with one another, but that he "eventually saw that Mullahs Fazal, Noori, Burhan, Wasseeq Sahib and Rohani were all among the other prisoners." Historian Andy Worthington, author of The Guantanamo Files, identified Noori as one of the men Zaeef recognized. He identified Mullah Wasseeq as Abdul-Haq Wasiq, Mullah Rohani as Gholam Ruhani and Mullah Fazal as Mohammed Fazil.

== Combatant Status Review Tribunal ==
Combatant Status Review Tribunals were held in a 3 x 5 meter trailer. The captive sat with his hands and feet shackled to a bolt in the floor. Three chairs were reserved for members of the press, but only 37 of the 574 Tribunals were observed.

Initially, the Bush administration asserted that they could withhold all the protections of the Geneva Conventions to captives from the war on terror. This policy was challenged before the Judicial branch. Critics argued that the U.S. could not evade its obligation to conduct competent tribunals to determine whether captives are, or are not, entitled to the protections of prisoner of war status.

Subsequently, the Department of Defense instituted the Combatant Status Review Tribunals. The Tribunals, however, were not authorized to determine whether the captives were lawful combatants—rather they were merely empowered to make a recommendation as to whether the captive had previously been correctly determined to match the Bush administration's definition of an enemy combatant.

=== Summary of Evidence memo ===
A Summary of Evidence memo was prepared for Mullah Noorullah Noori's Combatant Status Review Tribunal, on August 8, 2004. The memo listed the following allegations against him:

a. The detainee is a member of the Taliban.

1. The detainee traveled to Kabul to serve as a security guard for a Taliban official.
2. He later worked as a security guard for the governor of Jalalabad carrying a Kalashnikov rifle.
3. In 2000 the detainee moved to Mazar-E Sharif where he was a member of a 10-12 man team who provided security to the governor.
4. He was armed with a Kalashnikov while on guard duty.
5. The detainee served as the acting governor in Mazar-E Sharif for 8 to 9 months prior to his capture.

b. The detainee participated in military operations against the coalition.

1. He was fighting on the front lines at Mazar-E-Sharif as a Taliban fighter. As the front lines in Mazar-E-Sharif fell, he moved with a majority of the remaining fighters to Kunduz to reestablish the front lines.
2. He participated in a meeting where Taliban leaders decided to surrender to the Northern Alliance.
3. He was captured by Northern Alliance forces along with a Taliban leader and five Taliban soldiers.

=== Transcript ===
Noori chose to participate in his Combatant Status Review Tribunal. On March 3, 2006, in response to a court order from Jed Rakoff the Department of Defense published a five-page summarized transcript from his Combatant Status Review Tribunal.

== Administrative Review Board hearing ==
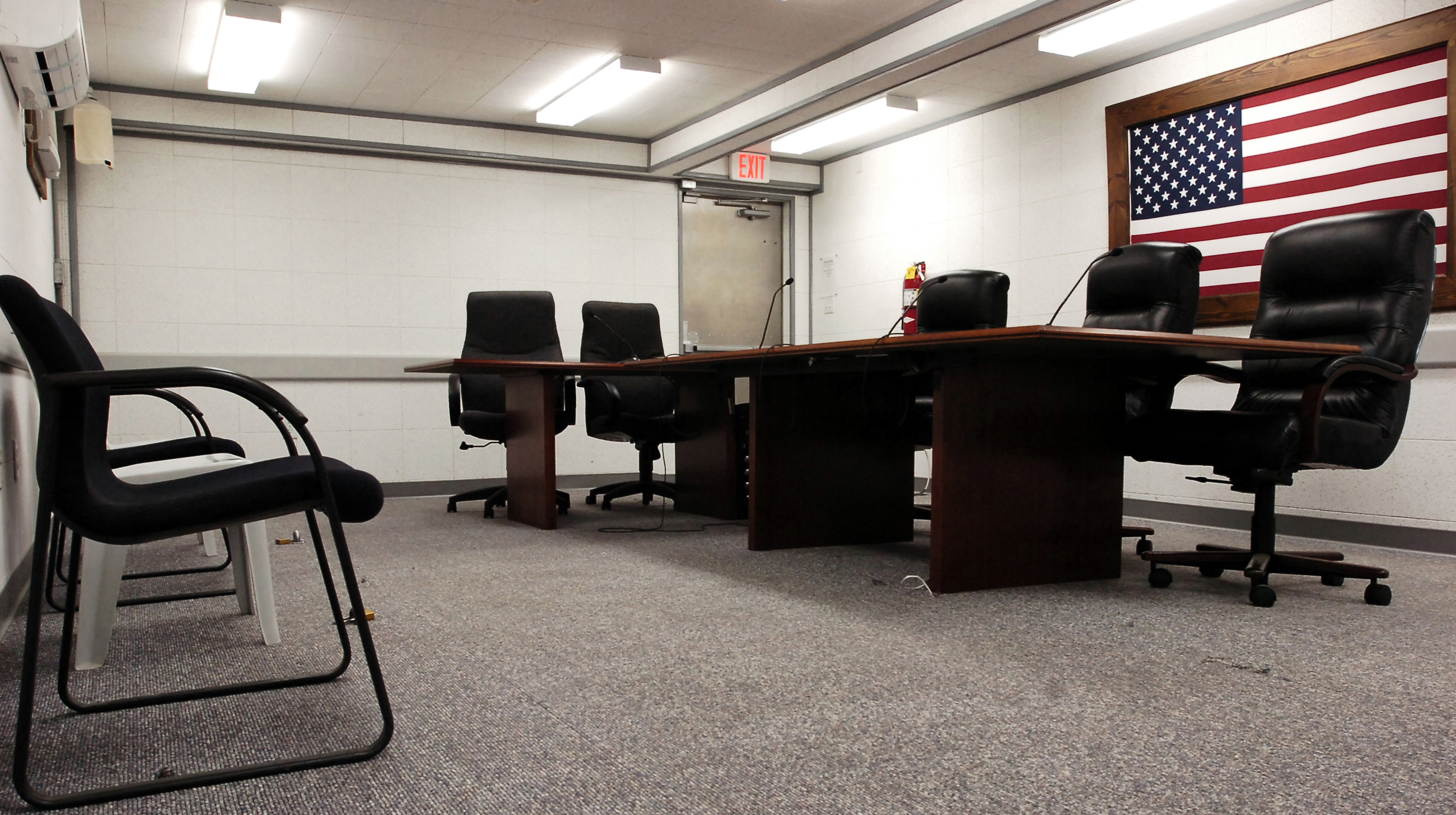
Hearing room where Guantanamo captive's annual Administrative Review Board hearings convened for captives whose Combatant Status Review Tribunal had already determined they were an "enemy combatant".

Detainees who were determined to have been properly classified as "enemy combatants" were scheduled to have their dossier reviewed at annual Administrative Review Board hearings. The Administrative Review Boards weren't authorized to review whether a detainee qualified for POW status and they weren't authorized to review whether a detainee should have been classified as an "enemy combatant".

They were authorized to consider whether a detainee should continue to be detained by the United States because they continued to pose a threat—or whether they could safely be repatriated to the custody of their home country, or whether they could be set free.

=== First annual Administrative Review Board ===
A Summary of Evidence memo was prepared for Noorullah Noori's first annual Administrative Review Board.

The following primary factors favor continued detention

a. Commitment

1. The detainee worked as a security guard for the governor of Jalalabad carrying a Kalashnikov rifle.
2. In 2000 the detainee moved to Mazar-E-Sharif where he was a member of 1 10-12-man team who provided security to the Governor.
3. The detainee served as the acting governor in Mazar-E-Sharif for 8 or 9 months prior to his capture.

b. Connections/Associations

The detainee traveled to Kabul to serve as a security guard for a Taliban official.

c. Other relevant data

The detainee participated in a meeting where Taliban leaders decided to surrender to the Northern Alliance.

The following primary factors favor release or transfer

a. CSRT

1. The detainee testified: "I needed to survive, so I did work with the government, which was at the time the Taliban government and I work with them and that's the only mistake I made if you want to call it that, or that's the only thing I did."

b. Exculpatory

1. The detainee emphasized this was merely a civilian position and he had no real political responsibilities within the Taliban. Additionally, he had no interaction with the leaders in the Taliban.
2. The detainee admitted his allegiance with the Taliban as he was fearful of standing against the current governing body in Afghanistan.
3. The detainee does not know any of the al Qaeda members detained at Guantanamo. He cannot interact with the Arabs as he does not speak their language.

==== Transcript ====
Noori chose to participate in his Administrative Review Board hearing.

=== Second annual Administrative Review Board ===
A Summary of Evidence memo was prepared for Noorullah Noori's second annual Administrative Review Board.

=== Third annual Administrative Review Board ===
A Summary of Evidence memo was prepared for Norullah Noori's third annual Administrative Review Board.

The following primary factors favor continued detention

a. Commitment

1. In September 1995 the detainee fought alongside al Qaida as a Taliban military general, against the Northern Alliance. The detainee was responsible for the line near Murghab, Afghanistan in the vicinity of Herat, Afghanistan.
2. The detainee claimed he joined the Taliban in 1999. He worked for the governor of Jalalabad, Afghanistan until December 1999. In February 2000 the detainee arrived in Mazar-e-Sharif, Afghanistan.
3. The detainee began working for the Taliban government as one of eight assistants to the Governor of Mazar-e-Sharif, Afghanistan.
4. The detainee eventually became the governor of the Balkh Province, Afghanistan as was one of a very few tribal members who could read and write. The detainee held this position for about eight to ten months. The detainee received the title of Mullah due to his education and political position.
5. The detainee was fighting on the front lines at Mazar-e-Sharif, Afghanistan as a Taliban fighter. As the front lines in Mazar-e-Sharif, Afghanistan fell the detainee moved with a majority of the remaining fighters to Kunduz, Afghanistan to reestablish the front lines.
6. While traveling from Mazar-e-Sharif, Afghanistan to Zabol Province, Afghanistan, the detainee agreed to negotiate with Dostums forces regarding surrender of Taliban forces.

b. Training

The detainee's job required him to stand guard duty, armed with a Kalashnikov, at buildings. The detainee denied ever receiving any training for this position. The detainee stated that he never learned how to take the weapon apart, but he knew how to use it.

c. Connections/Associations

1. The detainee was identified as the Taliban leader in charge of Mazar Bal, Afghanistan.
2. The detainee's name appears on a list of key Taliban personalities.
3. The detainee is a close associate of a high-ranking Taliban leader.
4. The detainee hosted al Qaida commanders.
5. The detainee held a meeting with the head of the Islamic movement of Uzbekistan, who discussed jihad in Uzbekistan.
6. While serving as the governor of Balkh province in Mazar-e-Sharif, Afghanistan the detainee met a subordinate of Usama bin Laden to pass a message from the Taliban supreme leader.

d. Intent

1. As of late July 2003, Taliban leaders close to the detainee were leading efforts in Zabol province, Afghanistan to destabilize the Afghan transitional administration.
2. As of early November 2003, while he was the Taliban zone chief, the detainee provided assistance to a friend who was using profits from the sale of narcotics to provide material support to the Taliban and al Qaida. The detainee had given him money and provided him with a money exchange shop.
3. A group of individuals, including a Taliban member, continue to work to support the detainee.

e. Other Relevant Data

The detainee was in charge of about 150 combat troops and one helicopter.

The following primary factors favor release or transfer

a. The detainee does not consider himself an enemy of the United States. The detainee has never believed that the United States. The detainee has never believed that the United States is an enemy of Afghanistan. The detainee reiterated that he never fought with or shot a gun at anyone.

b. The detainee advised that he did not know much about Usama bin Laden and had only heard of him on the radio. The detainee has never seen Usama bin Laden.

c. The detainee said that he is not against the United States in any way. If the detainee were allowed to return home, he would attempt to obtain a position in the new government with the hope of being able to provide for his family. The detainee would hold nothing against the United States and would not give support to anyone who was against the United States.

==== Board recommendations ====
In early September 2007, the Department of Defense released two heavily redacted memos from this board to Gordon R. England, the Designated Civilian Official. The review board convened on January 31, 2007. The board's recommendation was unanimous but was also redacted. The Board's recommendation was forwarded to England on March 29, 2007, and England authorized his continued detention on April 2, 2007.

== Writ of habeas corpus ==
Noorullah Noori had a writ of habeas corpus, Civil Action No. 08-cv-1828, filed on his behalf in late 2008 before US District Court Judge Ricardo M. Urbina. On December 17, 2008, Patricia A. Sullivan filed a "status report" on his behalf. She reported that Noorullah Noori had a DTA appeal filed on his behalf in 2007.

== Joint Review Task Force ==
When he assumed office in January 2009, President Barack Obama made a number of promises about the future of Guantanamo. He promised the use of torture would cease at the camp and also promised to institute a new review system. That new review system was composed of officials from six departments, where the OARDEC reviews were conducted entirely by the Department of Defense. When it reported back a year later, the Joint Review Task Force classified some individuals as too dangerous to be transferred from Guantanamo. On April 9, 2013, that document was made public after a Freedom of Information Act request. Noorullah Noori was one of the 71 individuals deemed too innocent to charge, but too dangerous to release. Although Obama promised that those deemed too innocent to charge but too dangerous to release would start to receive reviews from a Periodic Review Board, less than a quarter of men have received a review.

== Release negotiations ==
Most Afghans who had been held in detention at the U.S. facility had been repatriated to Afghanistan by 2009. Throughout the fall of 2011 and the winter of 2012, the United States conducted peace negotiations with the Taliban and widely leaked that a key sticking point was the ongoing detention of Noorullah and four other senior Taliban, Khirullah Khairkhwa, Mohammed Fazl, Abdul Haq Wasiq and . Negotiations hinged on a proposal to send the five men directly to Doha, Qatar, where they would be allowed to set up an official office for the Taliban.

In March 2012, it was reported that Ibrahim Spinzada, described as "Karzai's top aide" had spoken with the five men in Guantanamo earlier that month and had secured their agreement to be transferred to Qatar. Karzai, who had initially opposed the transfer, then reportedly backed the plan. It was reported that U.S. officials stated the Obama administration had not yet agreed to transfer the five men.

== Release from Guantanamo Bay ==
Noori and four other prisoners who were known as the Taliban five were released from Guantanamo Bay and flown by U.S. military C-17 aircraft into Qatar on June 1, 2014, where they were set free. Their release was in exchange for that of U.S. soldier Bowe Bergdahl who had been captured in Afghanistan five years earlier. The exchange was brokered by the Emir of Qatar. Noori and the others were required to stay in Qatar for 12 months as a condition of their release. Upon his release, the Taliban confirmed that Noori was eager to resume his efforts to kill Americans. "After arriving in Qatar, Noorullah Noori kept insisting he would go to Afghanistan and fight American forces there," a Taliban commander told reporters.
