= Fozilov =

Fozilov, feminine: Fozilova is a Tajik and Uzbek patronymic surname derived from the given name Fozil.

- Madina Fozilova (born 1996), Tajikistani footballer
- Tuhfa Fozilova (1917–1984), Tajikistani actress
