= Fasi =

Fasi may refer to:

== People ==
- Frank Fasi (1920–2010), United States politician
- ʻUhilamoelangi Fasi, Tongan politician and academic
- Ulf Fasi (Ulf Fase), jarl of Sweden
- Seuamuli Fasi Toma, Samoan politician
- Fasi Zaka (born 1976), Pakistani journalist

== Places ==
- Phasis (town) (now Poti), a former archbishopric in Lazica, Georgia, now a Latin titular see

== See also ==
- Fasil (disambiguation)
- Al-Fasi (disambiguation)
