= Fasil =

Fasil (or Fasıl, Faisal) may refer to:

== Music ==
- Fasıl, a suite in Ottoman classical music

== People with the name Fasil ==
=== Given name ===
- Fasilides (1603–1667), the former Emperor of Ethiopia
- Faisal Al-Dakhil (born 1957), Kuwaiti footballer
- Fasil Assefa (born 1984), Ethiopian painter
- Fasil Bizuneh (born 1980), German-born American long-distance runner
- Fasil Gerbremichael (born 2000), Ethiopian footballer

=== Surname ===
- Serkalem Fasil (born 1978), Ethiopian journalist and newspaper publisher
- Fahadh Faasil (born 1982), Indian actor and film producer

== Places ==
- Fasıl, Beypazarı, a neighborhood in Turkey
- Fasıl, Bolu, a village in Turkey
- Fasil Ghebbi, fortress in Gondar, Ethiopia

== Sports ==
- Fasil Kenema S.C., professional Ethiopian football club based in Gondar, Ethiopia

== See also ==
- Fazil (disambiguation)
- Fasi (disambiguation)
