= Mohammad Fazel Mazlum =

Afghan politician

Mullah Mohammad Fazel Mazlum محمدفاضل مظلوم
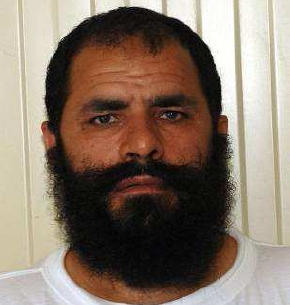

First Deputy Minister of Defense
- Incumbent
- Assumed office 7 September 2021
- Prime Minister: Mohammad Hassan Akhund (acting)
- Supreme Leader: Hibatullah Akhundzada
- Preceded by: Shah Mahmood Miakhel
- Succeeded by: Abdul Qayyum Zakir (acting)

Deputy Minister of Defense
- In office unknown – November 2001
- Prime Minister: Mohammed Rabbani; Abdul Kabir
- Leader: Mohammed Omar

Personal details
- Born: 1967 (age 58–59) Uruzgan Province, Afghanistan
- Party: Taliban

Military service
- Allegiance: Taliban; Islamic Emirate of Afghanistan (1996-2001; 2021-present)
- Branch/service: Afghan Army (1996-2001); Afghan Armed Forces (2021-present)
- Years of service: 1995-2002 (First Islamic Emirate); 2021-present (Second Islamic Emirate)
- Commands: 10th Division, Takhar Province (1996-2001)
- Battles/wars: Afghan civil war War in Afghanistan

Mohammad Fazel Mazlum (Pashto: محمدفاضل مظلوم [mʊˈhamad fɑˈzɪl]; born 1967) is a member of the Taliban militant group and the First Deputy Defense Minister of the Islamic Emirate of Afghanistan, having assumed the role on 7 September 2021. He also served in the position during the previous Taliban government (1996–2001).

He was held in the Guantanamo Bay detention camps in Cuba for 12 years after being classified as an enemy combatant by the United States. His Guantanamo Internment Serial Number was 7. He arrived at the Guantanamo detention camps on 11 January 2002 and was held there until 31 May 2014. He was released, along with the other four members of the so-called Taliban Five—Khairullah Khairkhwa, Abdul Haq Wasiq, Norullah Noori, and Mohammad Nabi Omari—in exchange for the release of United States Army soldier Bowe Bergdahl, a convicted deserter who had been held captive by the Taliban-aligned Haqqani network.

== Early life ==
American intelligence analysts estimate that Fazl was born in 1967, in Sekzi, Caher Cineh District, Uruzgan Province, Afghanistan. Fazl belonged to Kakar tribe of Pashtuns. Previously he served as the Deputy Minister of Defense during the 1996–2001 rule of the Islamic Emirate of Afghanistan. He negotiated an amnesty with the Afghan Northern Alliance leader Abdul Rashid Dostum. It is alleged that he is responsible for killing thousands of Shi'a Afghans between 1996 and late 2001.

== Held aboard the USS Bataan ==
Former Taliban Ambassador to Pakistan Abdul Salam Zaeef described his capture and being flown to the United States Navy's amphibious warfare vessel, the USS Bataan (LHD-5), for special interrogation. Zaeef wrote that the cells were located six decks down, were only 1 meter by 2 meters. He wrote that the captives weren't allowed to speak with one another, but that he "eventually saw that Mullahs Fazal, Noori, Burhan, Wasseeq Sahib and Rohani were all among the other prisoners." Historian Andy Worthington, author of The Guantanamo Files, identified Fazil as one of the men Zaeef recognized.

== Release negotiations ==
Most Afghans had been repatriated to Afghanistan by 2009. Throughout the fall of 2011 and the winter of 2012, the United States conducted peace negotiations with the Taliban, and it was widely leaked that a key sticking point was the ongoing detention of Fazl and four other senior Taliban, Norullah Noori, Khirullah Khairkhwa, Abdul Haq Wasiq and Mohammed Nabi. Negotiations hinged on a proposal to send the five men directly to Doha, Qatar, where they would be allowed to set up an official office for the Taliban.

In March 2012, it was reported that Ibrahim Spinzada, described as "Karzai's top aide" had spoken with the five men in Guantanamo earlier that month, and had secured their agreement to be transferred to Qatar. It was reported that Karzai, who had initially opposed the transfer, now backed the plan.

== Joint Review Task Force ==
When he assumed office in January 2009 President Barack Obama made a number of promises about the future of Guantanamo. He promised the use of torture would cease at the camp. He promised to institute a new review system. That new review system was composed of officials from six departments, where the OARDEC reviews were conducted entirely by the Department of Defense. When it reported back, a year later, the Joint Review Task Force classified some individuals as too dangerous to be transferred from Guantanamo, even though there was no evidence to justify laying charges against them. On April 9, 2013, that document was made public after a Freedom of Information Act request. Mohammed Fazl was one of the 71 individuals deemed too innocent to charge, but too dangerous to release. Although Obama promised that those deemed too innocent to charge, but too dangerous to release, would start to receive reviews from a Periodic Review Board, less than a quarter of men have received a review.

== Release ==
On June 1, 2014, Fazl, and the other four Taliban prisoners in Guantanamo Bay were released in Qatar in exchange for U.S. soldier Bowe Bergdahl who had been captured by the Taliban nearly five years previously. Bergdahl later pleaded guilty to the crime of desertion on October 16, 2017. Fazl and other members of the Taliban five, as part of the conditions of their release, were prohibited from leaving Qatar for one year. Human Rights Watch argues that despite his release from Guantanamo Bay, Fazl should be investigated and prosecuted for war crimes.

On 7 September 2021, he was reinstated as Deputy Defense Minister after the reestablishment of the Islamic Emirate of Afghanistan.
