= Abdul Haq Wasiq =

Afghan Director of Intelligence since 2021

Mullah Abdul Haq Wasiq عبدالحق وثیق
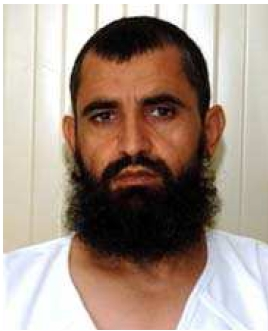
- Wasiq while detained at Guantanamo Bay

General Directorate of Intelligence Director of Intelligence
- Incumbent
- Assumed office September 7, 2021 (Note: Acting: 7 September 2021 – 15 August 2025)
- Leader: Hibatullah Akhundzada
- Preceded by: Office established
- Prime Minister: Hassan Akhund

Deputy Minister of Intelligence
- In office c. 1996 – November 2001
- Prime Minister: Mohammed Rabbani; Abdul Kabir
- Leader: Mohammed Omar

Personal details
- Born: 1971 (age 54–55) Ghazni Province, Afghanistan
- Party: Taliban
- Occupation: Politician, Taliban member

Military service
- Allegiance: Taliban (Islamic Emirate of Afghanistan)
- Years of service: 1996–2001
- Battles/wars: Afghan civil war War in Afghanistan

Abdul Haq Wasiq (Pashto: عبد الحق واثق [ˈabdʊl haq wɑˈsɪq]; born 1971) is the Director of Intelligence of the Islamic Emirate of Afghanistan since September 7, 2021. He was previously the Deputy Minister of Intelligence in the former Taliban government (1996–2001). He was held in extrajudicial detention in the Guantanamo Bay detainment camps, in Cuba, from 2002 to 2014. His Guantanamo Internment Serial Number was 4. American intelligence analysts estimate that he was born in 1971 in Ghazni Province, Afghanistan.

Abdul Haq Wasiq arrived at the Guantanamo detention camps on January 11, 2002, and he was held there until May 31, 2014. He was released, along with the other four members of the so-called Taliban Five—Mohammad Fazl, Khairullah Khairkhwa, Norullah Noori, and Mohammad Nabi Omari—in exchange for the release of United States Army soldier Bowe Bergdahl, who had been held captive by the Taliban-aligned Haqqani network.

== Held aboard the USS Bataan ==
Former Taliban Ambassador to Pakistan Abdul Salam Zaeef described being flown to the United States Navy's amphibious warfare vessel, the USS Bataan, for special interrogation. Zaeef wrote that the cells were located six decks down and were only 1 meter by 2 meters. He wrote that the captives weren't allowed to speak with one another, but that he "eventually saw that Mullahs Fazal, Noori, Burhan, Wasseeq Sahib and Rohani were all among the other prisoners." Historian Andy Worthington, author of The Guantanamo Files, identified Wasiq as one of the men Zaeef recognized. He identified Mullah Rohani as Gholam Ruhani, Mullah Noori as Norullah Noori and Mullah Fazal as Mohammed Fazil.

== Combatant Status Review ==
Wasiq was among the 60% of prisoners who participated in the Combatant Status Review Tribunal hearings. A Summary of Evidence memo was prepared for the tribunal of each detainee.

Wasiq's memo accused him of the following:

a The detainee is associated with al Qaida and the Taliban.
1. The detainee in a letter to his brother, included greetings to an al Qaida member.
2. The detainee was the Taliban Deputy Minister of Intelligence.
3. The detainee used a radio to communicate with the Taliban Chief of Intelligence.

b The detainee participated in military operations against the coalition.
1. The detainee was involved in the operation to re-establish the front lines of Konduz, Afghanistan.

== Administrative Review Board hearings ==
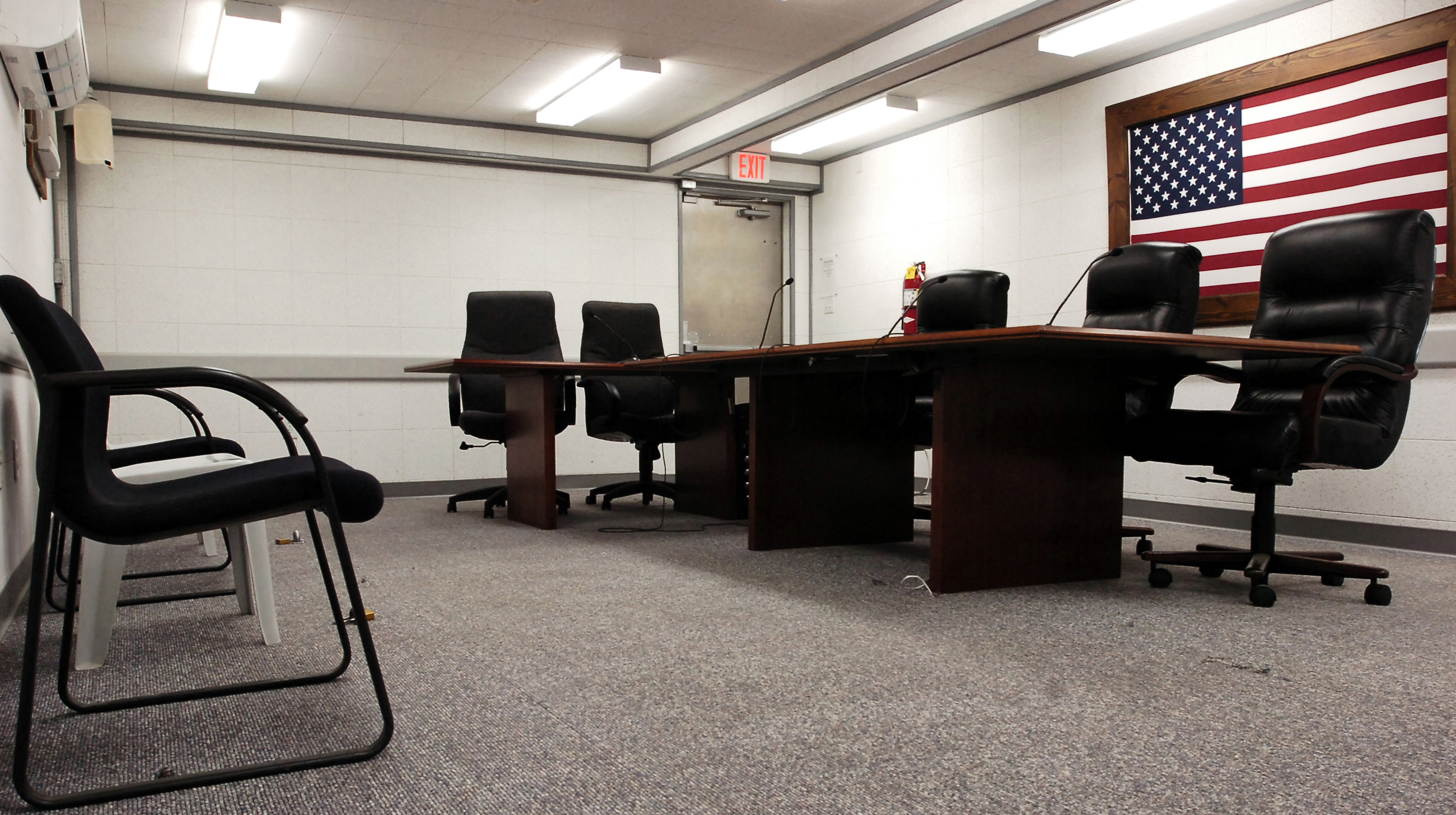
Hearing room where Guantanamo captive's annual Administrative Review Board hearings convened for captives whose Combatant Status Review Tribunal had already determined they were an "enemy combatant"

Detainees who were determined to have been properly classified as "enemy combatants" were scheduled to have their dossier reviewed at annual Administrative Review Board hearings. The Administrative Review Boards weren't authorized to review whether a detainee qualified for POW status and they weren't authorized to review whether a detainee should have been classified as an "enemy combatant".

The members of the Administrative Review Board were authorized to consider whether a detainee should continue to be detained by the United States because the detainee continued to pose a threat, whether the detainee could safely be repatriated to his home country, or whether the detainee should be released.

=== First annual Administrative Review Board ===
A Summary of Evidence memo was prepared for Abdul Haq Wasiq's first annual Administrative Review Board, on July 18, 2005. The memo listed factors for and against his continued detention.

The following primary factors favor continued detention

a. Commitment
1. The detainee served as Deputy Minister of Intelligence in the Taliban Intelligence Service.
2. The detainee served as acting Minister of Intelligence when Qari Ahmadullah was away from Kabul performing his duties as governor of Tahar province
3. The detainee was a participant in military operation in Konduz.
4. Detainee used Icom radios and provided information on communications security procedures within the Taliban Intelligence Department.

b. Connections/Associations
1. The detainee arranged to have an Egyptian al Qaida member, Hamza Zobir teach Taliban intelligence officers about intelligence work.
2. The detainee gave a suspected Afghani arms smuggler a Codan high frequency radio set for safekeeping. The suspected arms smuggler allegedly had many weapons caches near Ghazni.

The following primary factors favor release or transfer

a. At the time of his capture, the detainee claims he was attempting to assist the U.S. in capturing Mullah Mohammed Omar. He claims if the Americans had not arrested him, then they might have captured Mullah Mohammed Omar and the detainee's superior, Qari Ahmadullah, head of Taliban Intelligence.

b. Detainee has very few citations, primarily for non-aggressive infractions including physical training in cell, leading prayer; making excessive noise; and periodically refusing medications, food, and showers.

== Joint Review Task Force ==
When he assumed office in January 2009, President Barack Obama made a number of promises about the future of Guantanamo. He promised the use of torture would cease at the camp. He promised to institute a new review system. That new review system was composed of officials from six departments, where the OARDEC reviews were conducted entirely by the Department of Defense. When it reported back, a year later, the Joint Review Task Force classified some individuals as too dangerous to be transferred from Guantanamo, even though there was no evidence to justify laying charges against them. On April 9, 2013, that document was made public after a Freedom of Information Act request. Abdul Haq Wasiq was one of the 71 individuals deemed too innocent to charge, but too dangerous to release. Although Obama promised that those deemed too innocent to charge, but too dangerous to release would start to receive reviews from a Periodic Review Board less than a quarter of men have received a review.

== Press reports ==
An article in The Christian Science Monitor quotes Ahmadullah, who was told by Mohammed Omar to go back to Kandahar. It quotes him:

"He called me twice to come to Kandahar. But I cannot go there easily, because a lot of people know me, and I am frightened they will capture me somewhere on the road. So I sent my assistant Mullah Abdul Haq Wasiq to Kandahar. Unfortunately he was captured by American agents in Ghazni."

== Release negotiations ==
Most Afghans held at Guantanamo had been repatriated to Afghanistan by 2009. Throughout the fall of 2011 and the winter of 2012, the United States conducted peace negotiations with the Taliban and widely leaked that a key sticking point was the ongoing detention of Wasiq and four other senior Taliban, Norullah Noori, Mohammed Fazl, Khirullah Khairkhwa and Mohammed Nabi. Negotiations hinged on a proposal to send the five men directly to Doha, Qatar, where they would be allowed to set up an official office for the Taliban.

In March 2012, it was reported that Ibrahim Spinzada, described as "Karzai's top aide" had spoken with the five men in Guantanamo earlier that month, and had secured their agreement to be transferred to Qatar. It was reported that Karzai, who had initially opposed the transfer, now backed the plan. It was reported that US officials stated the Obama administration had not yet agreed to transfer the five men.

== Release from Guantanamo Bay ==
Wasiq and the other four members of the Taliban Five were released from Guantanamo Bay and transported to Qatar where they were set free on June 1, 2014. Their release concurred with that of captured U.S. soldier Bowe Bergdahl's release in eastern Afghanistan in a deal brokered by the Emir of Qatar. Wasiq, and the other members of the Taliban five, were required to stay in Qatar for 12 months as a condition of their release.
