= Government negotiation with terrorists =

Government policies and actions regarding negotiations with terrorists

Most Western countries have a stated policy of not negotiating with terrorists. This policy is typically invoked during hostage crises and is limited to paying ransom demands, not other forms of negotiation. Motivations for such policies include a lack of guarantee that terrorists will ensure the safe return of hostages, and worries about the increasing incentive for terrorists to take more hostages in the future.

On June 18, 2013, G8 leaders signed an agreement against paying ransoms to terrorists. However, most Western states have violated this policy on certain occasions. An investigation by The New York Times found that al-Qaeda and its affiliates have taken in at least $125 million in revenue from kidnappings since 2008. These payments were made almost exclusively by European governments, which funneled the money through a network of proxies, sometimes masking it as development aid.

Some Western countries, such as the United States, Canada, and Britain, tend not to negotiate or pay ransom to terrorists. Others, such as France, Germany, Italy, and Switzerland are more open to negotiation. This is a source of tension between governments with opposing policies.

== By country ==
=== United States ===
The United States traditionally has a policy against negotiating with terrorists. However, there have been heavily criticized incidents in which U.S. government leaders were found to have negotiated with terrorists:

- In the Iran–Contra affair, the Reagan administration sought to free seven American hostages being held in Lebanon by Hezbollah, a paramilitary group with Iranian ties connected to the Islamic Revolutionary Guard Corps, by selling them weapons. The scandal led to the resignation of several high ranking US government officials.
- In May 2014, the U.S. government secured the release of Sergeant Bowe Bergdahl in exchange for five Taliban prisoners held in Guantanamo. His release led to criticism by Republican lawmakers, who claimed President Barack Obama had abandoned the decades-old U.S. policy of not negotiating with terrorists.

In June 2024, reports surfaced that the administration of President Joe Biden was negotiating the release of American hostages held by Hamas. These negotiations were considered to be separate from the ongoing Israeli-Palestinian negotiations.

=== Israel ===
Israel negotiated the Oslo accords in 1993 with the Palestine Liberation Organization.

Israel generally does not negotiate with terrorists. Counter examples include:

- The Gilad Shalit prisoner exchange in 2011, where Hamas released Israeli soldier Gilad Shalit in exchange for 1,027 prisoners held by Israel.
- 2023 Israeli–Palestinian prisoner exchange, and subsequent exchanges during the January 2025 Gaza war ceasefire.

=== Other ===
In 1988, the Spanish government negotiated with the ETA six months after the group had killed 21 shoppers in the 1987 Hipercor bombing.

The British government maintained a secret back-channel to the Irish Republican Army, even after the 1991 Downing Street mortar attack.

In January 2015, hostages Haruna Yukawa and Kenji Goto were beheaded by ISIL after Japan refused to meet ISIL's demand of $200 million for the release of the hostages.

== See also ==
- Rewards for Justice Program
