= Abdur Razzaq Akhundzada =

Afghan politician

Abdur Razzaq Akhundzada عبدالرزاق آخوندزاده
- Born: 1958 (age 67–68); Spin Boldak District, Kandahar Province, Kingdom of Afghanistan
- Occupations: Politician, Taliban member
- Known for: Quetta Shura Member
- Predecessor: Khairullah Khairkhwa
- Successor: Yunus Qanuni

Mullah Abdur Razzaq Akhundzada (born 1958) is a Pashtun politician who served as the Interior Minister of Afghanistan in 2001. He served as the governor of Herat in 1997 and is believed to be a member of the Taliban leadership. He is rumoured to belong to the Achakzai tribe, from a family of Jalaludin village, Spin Boldak District, Kandahar Province; it is also claimed that he is in fact not an Afghan, but is a Pakistani national.

Abdul Razzaq traveled to Pakistan in mid-May 2000 to discuss the extradition of criminals, terrorism, drug trafficking and the Afghanistan–Pakistan Transit Trade Agreement. Pakistan demanded the closure of 18 Afghan training camps, where Pakistani militants were believed to be receiving training.

Razzaq was captured in an uprising in Mazar-i-Sharif but later escaped.

The British paper The Scotsman reported that Razzaq was a founding member of the Taliban; that he headed the Taliban's customs department; and was later interior minister. The article further alleged that Razzaq was the number two in a then new Taliban military command structure.
