= 1st Battalion, 227th Aviation Regiment =

1st Battalion 227th Aviation Regiment
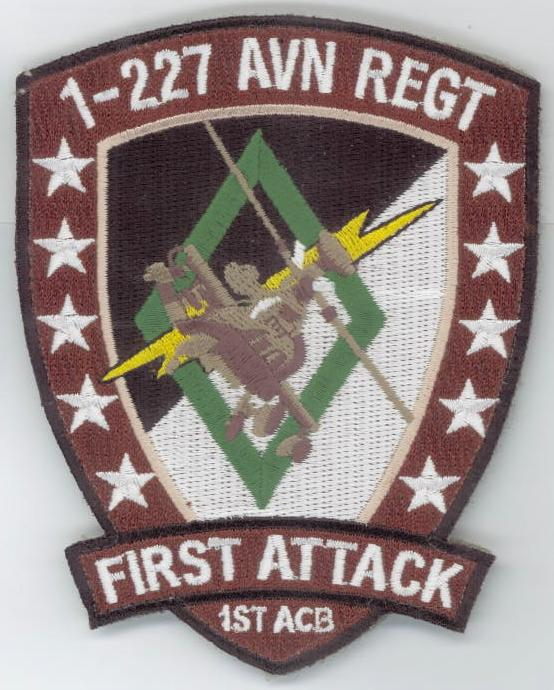
- 1-227th Unit Flight Patch
- Active: 11 February 1963 – Present
- Country: United States
- Allegiance: United States of America
- Branch: United States Army
- Type: Attack helicopter battalion
- Part of: 1st Cavalry Division
- Garrison/HQ: Fort Cavazos, Texas
- Nickname: First Attack
- Motto: "ATTACK"
- Engagements: Vietnam War; Operation Desert Storm; Operation Iraqi Freedom; Operation Enduring Freedom

Commanders
- Current commander: LTC Wyatt A. Britten

The 1st Battalion, 227th Aviation Regiment is an attack helicopter battalion of the 1st Air Cavalry Brigade, 1st Cavalry Division. The battalion is an AH-64 Apache battalion based at Fort Hood, Texas.

== History ==
The unit's nickname is "First Attack" because 1st Cavalry Division was "First into Manila" in February 1945. Major General William C. Chase gave the Division its nickname "First Team", it was well-received and remains today. In September 1945, the "First Team" led occupational forces in to Japan's capital city, earning the distinction of "First in Tokyo". Next, the 1st Cavalry Division stormed ashore at Poe-Hongdong, South Korea, in the Korean War's first amphibious landing. By July 1950, the Division began offensive operations to the north and crossed the 38th parallel on 9 October 1950. Closing on North Korea's capital 10 days later, the "First Team" was "First in Pyongyang". In July 1965, the 1st Cavalry Division was re-stationed to Fort Benning, Georgia and organized for new missions in Southeast Asia. The unit became the Army's first "Airmobile" division and initially saw combat in the Republic of Vietnam during the thirty-five-day Pleiku Campaign, earning a Presidential Unit Citation. The enemy launched the famous Tet Offensive in late January 1968. Already on the move, the "First Team" rushed north, liberating cities and boldly repelling the enemy offensive. The Division's sky troopers flew in to relieve the besieged Marine base at Khe Sanh and the Division was "First into Cambodia" in May 1970.

From the beginning of the Global War on Terrorism, the 1st Cavalry Division and its Brigades continued this tradition of service by deploying six times to Iraq in support of Operation Iraq Freedom and Operation New Dawn. These deployments would include engaging anti Iraqi and Al-Qaeda forces throughout the country, the first free elections in Iraq and providing training to Iraqi security forces and support to the people. The Division's four BCTs deployed to Iraq in 2010-2011 as Advise and Assist Brigades and their goal was to strengthen Iraqi sovereignty, stability, and self-reliance while supporting counter-terrorism operations. Operation New Dawn marked the Division's last deployment to Iraq. The 1st Cavalry Division and its brigades would deploy to Afghanistan four separate times in support of Operation Enduring Freedom. In 2011, the Division distinguished itself by exceptionally meritorious achievement from 19 May 2011 to 19 April 2012 in Regional Command – East, Afghanistan. The command created a unified team that was integrated in all operations and committed to working by, with and through Afghan institutions. The First Cavalry Division Headquarters deployed to Afghanistan to assume command of Regional Command-South on 7 July 2014 and later the Train, Advise, Assist Command-South. United States' and Coalition Forces, under the command of the 1st Cavalry Division in Southern Afghanistan, conducted train, advise, and assist missions so that the Afghan National Security Forces would be sustainable and capable of protecting their population and government into the future. With the 1st Cavalry Division Headquarters and elements of the 3d Cavalry Regiment deployed to Afghanistan, events required the Division's remaining units take on new missions around the world. Units deployed to areas where no 1st Cavalry Division Troopers have ever been or had not seen for decades. These areas included Europe, Korea, Africa and Cuba. First Team Troopers demonstrated their excellence while performing a wide variety of missions during multiple operations. The Army's finest Soldiers and best equipment, the hard-riding spirit of the United States Cavalry is alive and well in the 1st Cavalry Division. Our more than 26,000 Soldiers combine the spirit of the Cav's heritage with challenges facing an alert, combat-ready, armored division. The "First Team" remains ready to fight anywhere, anytime, and win.

=== Service dates ===
The original unit was constituted 1 February 1963 as Company A, 227th Assault Helicopter Battalion, an element of the 11th Air Assault Division. The unit was officially activated on 11 February 1963 at Fort Benning, Georgia. On 1 July 1965 the unit was reorganized and re-designated as Company A, 227th Aviation Battalion and officially assigned to the 1st Cavalry Division at Fort Hood, Texas. The unit was inactivated from 19 November 1974 to 21 May 1978. The company was again active from 1978 to 1983 at Fort Hood. The company was inactivated on 30 September 1983. On 16 July 1987 the unit was reactivated and re-designated Headquarters and Headquarters Company, 1st Battalion, 227th Aviation at Fort Hood, Texas. 1 October 2005 the battalion was re-designated 1st Battalion, 227th Aviation Regiment and on 16 October 2005 it was relieved from assignment to the 1st Cavalry Division and assigned to the Combat Aviation Brigade, 1st Cavalry Division.

=== Vietnam War ===
On 1 February 1963, the Army began to gather helicopters into the 11th Air Assault Division to test the airmobile concept. In June 1965, the 11th Air Assault was joined with the 2d Infantry Division. Shortly thereafter, the division exchanged colors with the 1st Cavalry Division. On 1 August 1965, the 1st Cavalry Division was sent to Vietnam. The battalion participated in 14 campaigns and received seven decorations during its 7 years of duty in Vietnam.

Upon return from Vietnam, the 227th Aviation Battalion was inactivated on 19 November 1974 at Fort Hood, Texas. After a brief reactivation from 21 May 1978 until 30 September 1983, it was re-designated as 1st Battalion, 227th Aviation Regiment, the first divisional Apache Attack Helicopter Battalion to be formed. Upon re-designation, the 1–227th underwent an intensive 6-month unit training program and began to training for combat operations.

=== The Gulf War & the 1990s ===
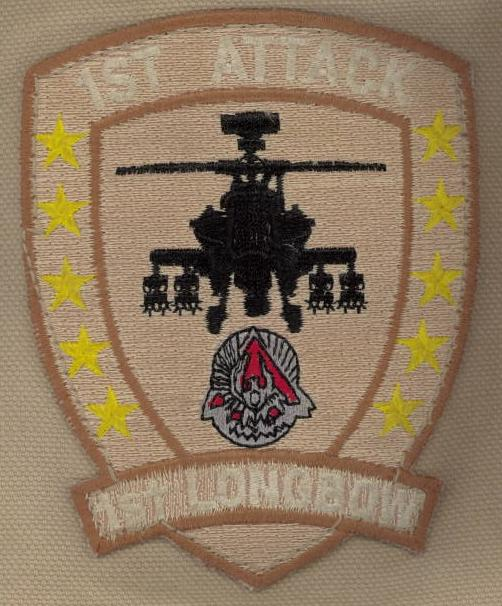
1-227th's Flight Patch in the late 1990s

On 29 September 1990, the battalion deployed overseas to Dhahran, Saudi Arabia, where the unit postured for combat in Operation Desert Shield. On 25 February 1991, with the onset of Operation Desert Storm, the battalion conducted a raid as a part of the 1st Cavalry Division's deception plan. The battalion would serve as the vanguard of the division's movement north to cut off retreating an Iraqi Republican Guard Division at Basra. On 7 March 1991, the battalion would return as part of the advance party back to Fort Hood, Texas.

On 2 June 1998, after years of testing and preparation, 1st Battalion, 227th Aviation Regiment became the first Army Aviation Battalion to field the AH-64 Apache "Longbow".

=== Global War on Terror ===
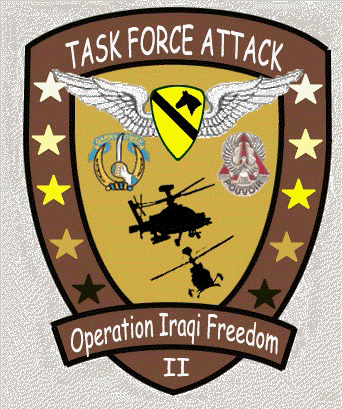
OIFII task force unit patch

With the onset of Operation Iraqi Freedom (OIF), the 1st Battalion, 227th Aviation Regiment, under the command of LTC Dan Ball, arrived at Camp Udari, Kuwait, on 14 February 2003, and was attached to Task Force 11th Aviation Regiment operating under the command of the U.S. Army V Corps.

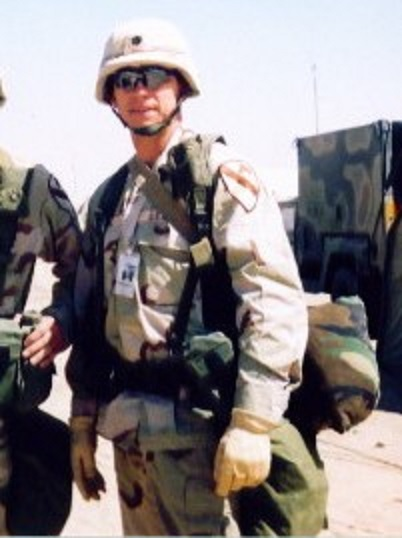
LTC Dan Ball on 29 March 2003 U.S. ARMY TACTICAL ASSEMBLY AREA VICKSBURG, Iraq

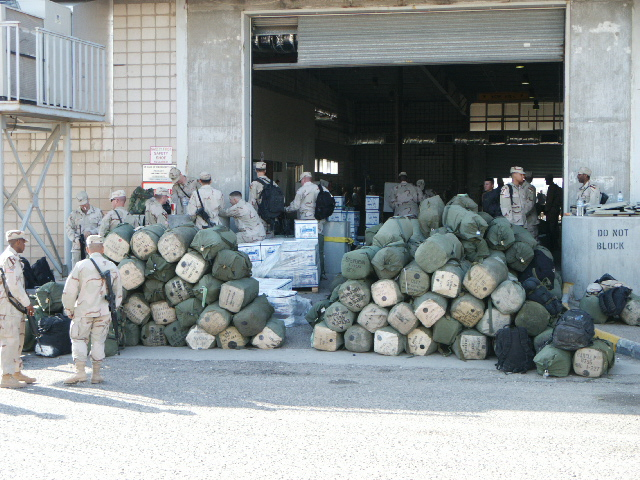
1st Battalion, 227th Aviation Regiment, under the command of LTC Dan Ball, arrived at Camp Udari, Kuwait, on 14 February 2003

In the early hours of 24 March 2003, Apache Longbows of the 1st Battalion, 227th Aviation, 1st Cavalry Division, engaged units of Iraq's Republican Guard Medina Division between the cities of Karbala and Al Hillah, about 96 kilometers (60 mi) south of Baghdad.

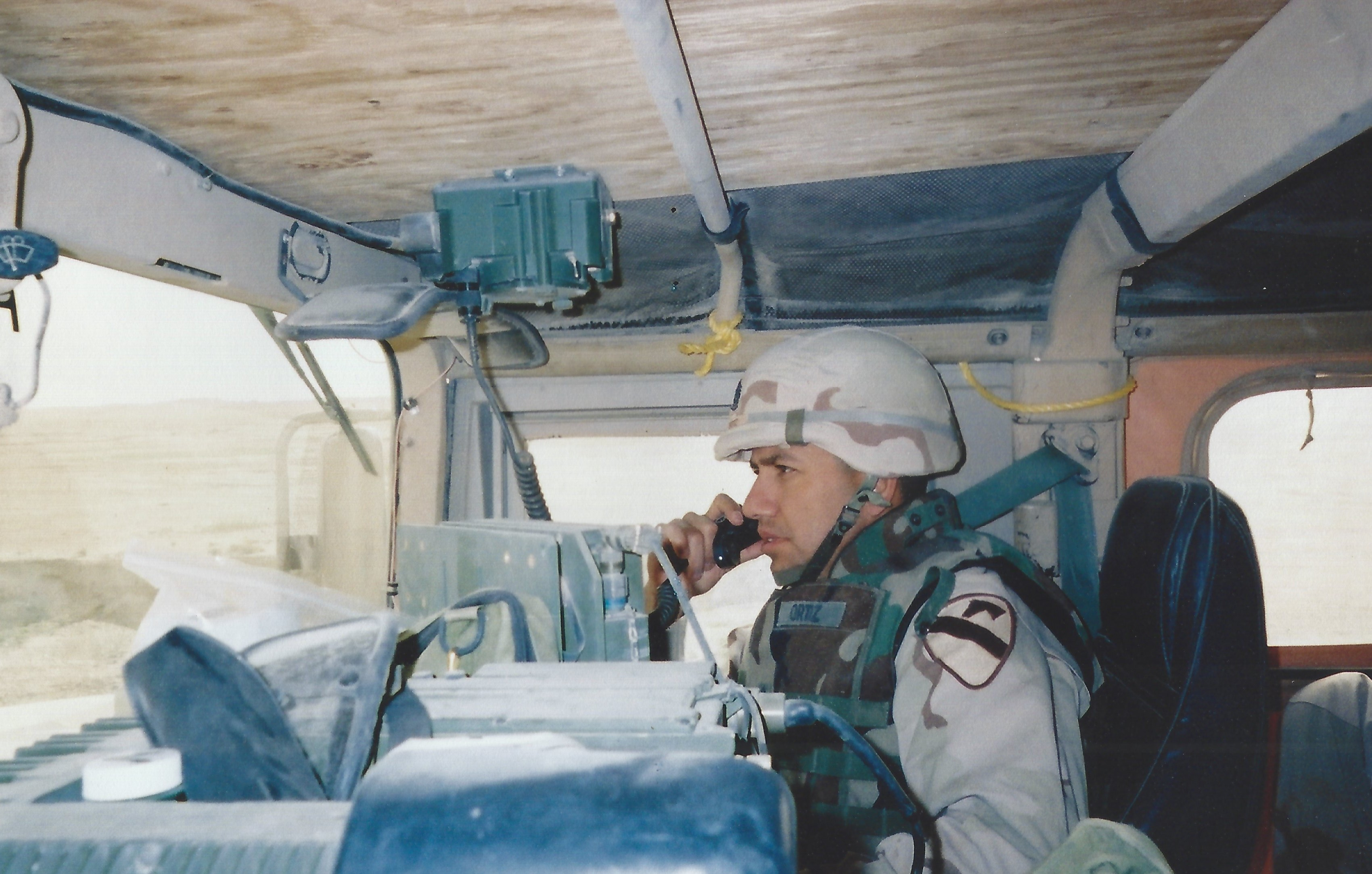
CSM Ortiz leading convoy from Kuwaiti border to TACTICAL ASSEMBLY AREA VICKSBURG, Iraq

A majority of the battalion's helicopters sustained extensive battle damage, but only one went down. Both pilots survived and were captured, later being rescued by US Marines after the fall of Baghdad. On 21 May 2003, the battalion redeployed to Fort Hood.

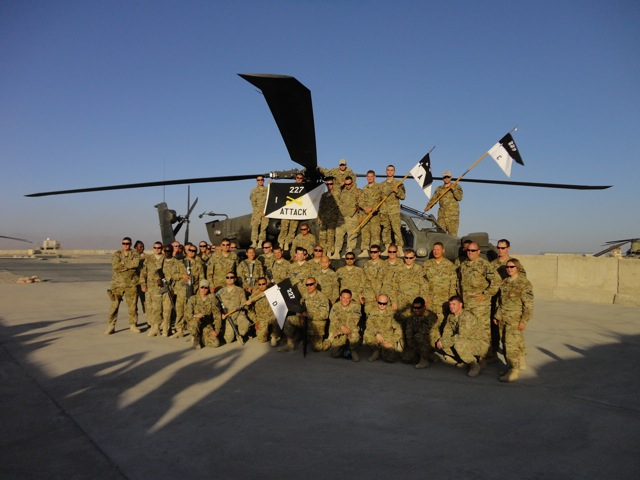
The maintainers of the BN pose with the 1st AH-64D to exceed 10,000 operational flying hours, FOB Sharana, Afghanistan

First Battalion, 227th Aviation Regiment has deployed to Iraq three more times in support of Operation Iraqi Freedom. From April 2004 to April 2005, under the command of LTC Ron Lewis,

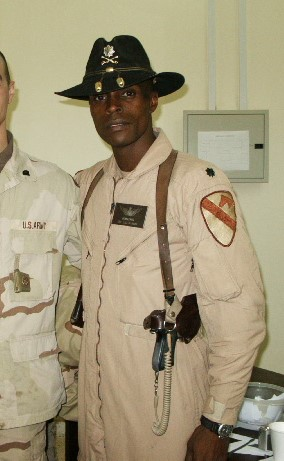
LTC Lewis at HHC 1-227 AVN BN 1CD mandatory Christmas party, Camp Taji, Iraq

the battalion returned to Iraq as part of OIF II, and helped set up Camp Taji for aviation operations. In October 2006 the battalion once again deployed to Camp Taji under the command of LTC Christopher E. Walach, for a 15-month deployment in support of OIF 06-08. The battalion again deployed to camp Taji, under the command of LTC Charles Dalcourt, from April 2009 to April 2010 in support of OIF 09-10.

After a 6-month reset, the battalion task-organized into a full-spectrum task force and began deployment preparations for deployment to Afghanistan. In January 2011, the task force deployed to Fort Carson, Colorado, for High Altitude Mountain Environmental Training (HAMET), to better prepare the aircrews for the extreme altitudes of Afghanistan's Paktika Province. In May 2011, the task force deployed to FOB Sharana, Paktika, Afghanistan where it conducted full-spectrum aviation operations throughout the Paktika, Paktia, Ghazni and Khost provinces in support of Regional Command (East). In July 2011, the Task Force made history when one of their AH-64Ds became the first AH-64D to exceed 10,000 operational flying hours. After a year at Sharana, First Attack redeployed to Fort Hood with the 1st ACB. In July 2012, the unit re-organized as an Apache-pure attack Battalion focused on regeneration and training operations for future deployment contingencies.

== Subordinate companies ==
The battalion consists of three Apache Longbow companies and a headquarters, maintenance, and forward support company.

Company	Company Nickname	Patch	Primary Mission
Headquarters Company	Nightriders		Headquarters and Headquarters Company, the headquarters and staff of the Task Force. All the task force's senior officers and support staff belong to the Nightriders.
Alpha Company	Avengers		Alpha Company "Avengers", an AH-64D Attack Helicopter company consisting of 8 AH-64D Longbows, crews, and support personnel.
Bravo Company	Reapers		Bravo Company "Reapers", an AH-64D Attack Helicopter company consisting of 8 AH-64D Longbows, crews, and support personnel.
Charlie Company	Vampires		Charlie Company "Vampires", an AH-64D Attack Helicopter company consisting of 8 AH-64D Longbows, crews, and support personnel.
Delta Company	Bone Crushers		Delta Company "Bone Crushers", the unit-level aviation maintenance company. Delta's primary mission is the maintenance of the helicopters in the battalion.
Echo Company	Dark Horse		Echo Company "Dark Horse", a forward support company. Company photo taken in Iraq at Camp Taji right before Christmas. At the time picture was taken Echo Company had not formed and was still part of HHC under the command of Captain Perry. Unlike the other companies, most of the personnel assigned to Echo are not aviation specialties. Echo has the most wide-ranging mission, encompassing refueling, communications support, ground vehicle maintenance, and food service.

== Unit decorations ==
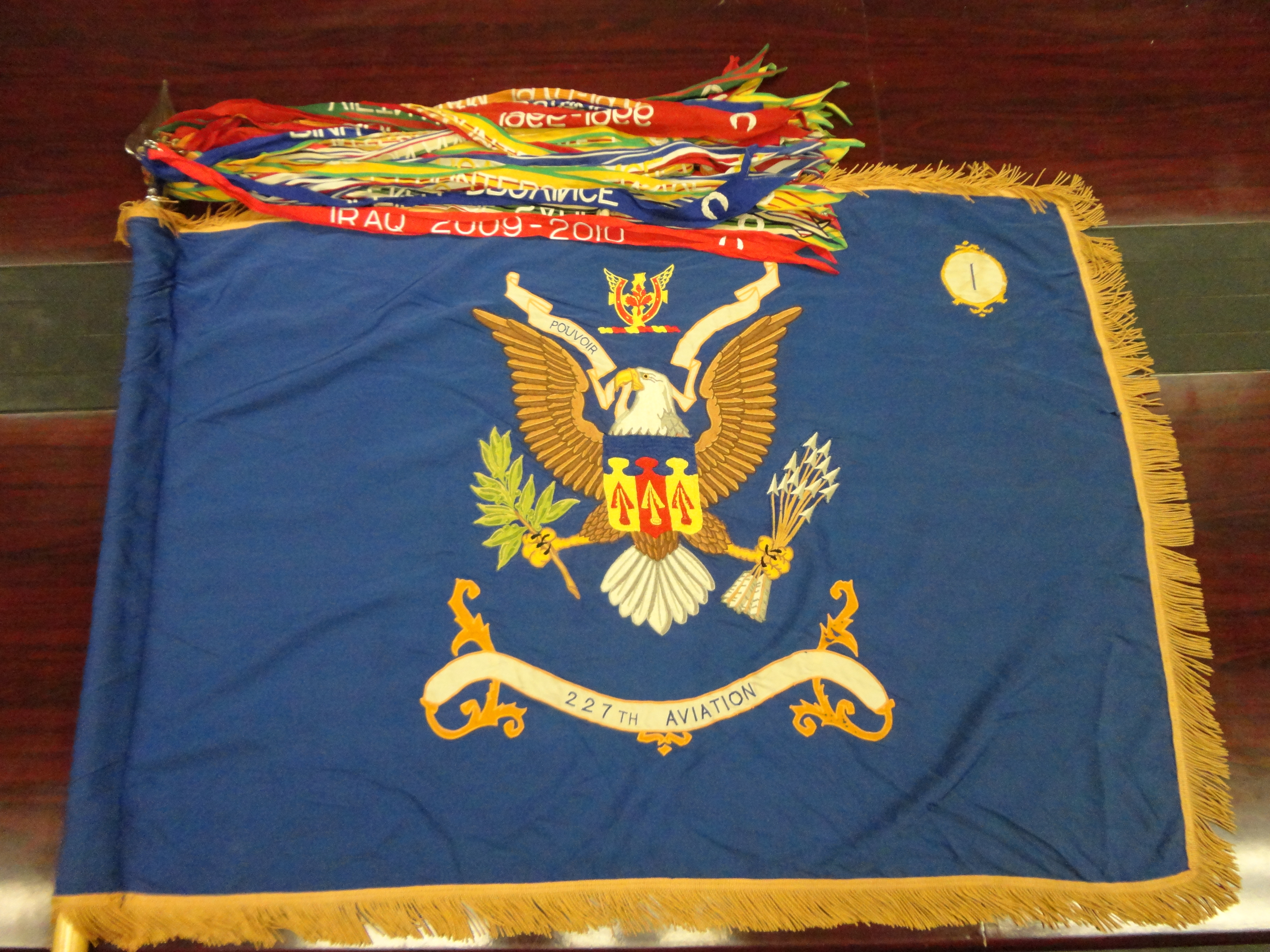
The regimental colors and battle streamers of 1-227 AV. The blue and red streamers of the Presidential Unit Citations and Meritorious Unit Commendations are prominent

=== Presidential Unit Citation (Army) ===
Streamer embroidered "PLEIKU PROVINCE"

The 1st Cavalry Division (Airmobile and attached units), distinguished themselves by outstanding performance of duty and extraordinary heroism in action against an armed enemy in the Republic of Vietnam during the period of 23 October 1965 to 26 November 1965. Following the attack on Special Forces camp at Plei Me, in Pleiku Province, on 19 October 1965 by regular units of the Army of North Vietnam, the 1st Cavalry Division (Airmobile) was committed to action. The division was initially assigned the mission of protecting the key communications center of Pleiku, in addition to providing fire support both for an Army of the Republic of Vietnam (ARVN) armored column dispatched to the relief of the besieged camp, and for the camp itself. The 1st Cavalry Division, (Airmobile), having recently been organized under a completely new concept in tactical mobility, and having arrived in the Republic of Vietnam on la month earlier, responded quickly and with and infantry brigade and supporting forces. Using air assault techniques, the division deployed artillery batteries into firing positions deep within the enemy-held territory and provided the vital fire support needed by the ARVN forces to accomplish the relief of the Special Forces camp. By 27 October, the tactical and strategic impact of the presence of a North Vietnamese regular army division in the Pleiku Province necessitated a chance in the missions for the 1st Cavalry Division. The division was given a unlimited offensive role to seek out and destroy the enemy force. With bold thrusts, elements of the division pursued the North Vietnamese regiments across the dense and trackless jungles of the west-central highlands, seeking the enemy out in his previously secure sanctuaries and giving him no quarter. In unfavorable terrain and under logistical and tactical conditions that would have stopped a unit with less capability, motivation, and espirit, the cavalrymen repeatedly and decisively defeated numerically superior enemy forces. The superb training, unflinching devotion to duty, and unsurpassed gallantry and intrepidity of the cavalrymen, individually and collectively, resulted in numerous victories and succeeded in driving the invading North Vietnamese division back from its positions at Plei Me to the foot of the Chu Pong Massif. There, in the valley of the Ia Drang, the enemy was reinforced by a fresh regiment and undertook preparation for more incursions into Pleiku Province. The 1st Cavalry Division deployed by air its men and weapons to launch and attack on the enemy staging area, which was 35 kilometers from the nearest road and 50 kilometers from the nearest logistical base. Fully utilizing the air mobility in applying their combat power in a series of offensive blows, the men of the division completely defeated the numerically superior enemy. When the enemy finally withdrew his broken forces from the battlefield, the offensive capability of the North Vietnamese Army in the II Corps tactical zone had been blunted. The outstanding performance and extraordinary heroism of the member so the 1st Cavalry Division (Airmobile) and attached units, under the most hazardous and adverse conditions, reflect great credit upon themselves, the United States Army, and the Armed Forces of the United States. -- Department of the Army, General Order 1967-40

Streamer embroidered "BINH THUAN PROVINCE"

The 2nd Battalion, 7th Cavalry, 1st Cavalry Division, and attached units, distinguished themselves by extraordinary heroism in connection with military operations against a hostile force in the Binh Thuan Province, Republic of Vietnam, during the period of 25 August 1966 through 4 April 1967. The Battalion and its attached organizations, which comprised Task Force 2/7, supported the Republic of Vietnam in its revolutionary development program in Binh Thuan Province. The area was almost entirely under Viet Cong control when Task Force 2/7 arrived in the province. The 482nd and 840th Viet Cong Battalions and their ancillary units, operated almost at will throughout the area, except for the coastal enclaves of Phan Thiet, which was still under government control. Operating over an area almost 5,000 square kilometers, Task Force 2/7 struck at enemy forces in a succession of brilliantly conceived and gallantly executed maneuvers. During this period, the Task Force mounted 371 combat assaults into enemy held territory. In eight months of fierce combat, the Task Force lost 11 men while causing the enemy to lose 481 men. It captured 70 enemy soldiers, 151 weapons, 291 tons of rice, 3.6 tons of salt, and 7.4 tons of other grains. It destroyed over 600 bunkers and numerous installations. The spirit, devotion to duty, and courage displayed by Task Force 2/7 personnel set a superb example for the Republic of Vietnam Force in the area. Control of Binh Thuan Province passed from the Viet Cong to the free world military forces, and the enemy was unable to operate effectively in strength by day or night. The conspicuous gallantry, intrepidity, heroism, and audacity displayed by the members of the task force in combat are in keeping with the highest traditions of the military service and reflect great credit upon them, their units, and the Armed Forces of the United States. -- Department of the Army, General Order 1973-02

- Valorous Unit Award (Army), Streamer embroidered QUANG TIN PROVINCE
- Valorous Unit Award (Army), Streamer embroidered BIEN HOA PROVINCE
- Valorous Unit Award (Army), Streamer embroidered FISH HOOK
- Valorous Unit Award (Army), Streamer embroidered FIRE SUPPORT BASE 6
- Meritorious Unit Commendation (Army), Streamer embroidered VIETNAM 1965–1966
- Meritorious Unit Commendation (Army), Streamer embroidered SOUTHWEST ASIA 1990–1991
- Meritorious Unit Commendation (Army), Streamer embroidered IRAQ 2009–2010

=== Naval Unit Commendation (Navy) ===
Fore exceptionally meritorious service during assigned mission in support of Operation Iraqi Freedom from 2 August 2004 to 1 February 2005. I Marine Expeditionary Force (I MEF) (Reinforced) conducted a coordinated campaign across a 400-mile arc of the Euphrates River Valley to eliminate insurgent control over the key cities of An Najaf and Al Fallujah and the remainder of the local population in the I MEF Area of Responsibility. The battle for An Najaf and Al Fallujah were the largest U.S. led urban operations since the Vietnam War. Both battles saw the introduction of new and innovative tactics, techniques, and procedures which became ke to I MEF's success. Throughout 24 days of intense conflict in An Najaf, the Marines conducted destruction raids on insurgent strongholds, captured weapons caches, and engaged in fierce close-quarter battle. During this operation, I MEF killed more that 1,500 enemy insurgents while simultaneously preserving the sacred Imam Ali Shrine and Mosque Complex. In response to the violent insurgent actions in Al Fallujah, a coalition force of 12,500 led by 1 MEF, boldly breached the city's fortifications and destroyed a heavily armed and well-entrenched fanatical enemy. Countless across of individual bravery in Al Fallujah resulted in more than 2,000 enemy killed or captured as the Marines, Soldiers, and Sailors fiercely fought and cleared the city, house by house. By their outstanding courage, resourcefulness, and aggressive fighting spirit in combat against the enemy, the officers and enlisted personnel of I Marine Expeditionary Force (Reinforced) reflected great credit upon themselves and upheld the highest traditions of the Marine Corps and the United States Naval Service. -- Department of the Navy, MARADMIN Active Number: 074/07

- Republic of Vietnam Cross of Gallantry with Palm, Streamer embroidered VIETNAM 1965–1969
- Republic of Vietnam Cross of Gallantry with Palm, Streamer embroidered VIETNAM 1969–1970
- Republic of Vietnam Cross of Gallantry with Palm, Streamer embroidered VIETNAM 1970–1971
- Republic of Vietnam Civil Action Honor Medal, First Class, Streamer embroidered VIETNAM 1969–1970

== Campaign participation credit ==
=== Vietnam ===
- Defense
- Counteroffensive
- Counteroffensive, Phase II
- Counteroffensive, Phase III
- Tet Counteroffensive
- Counteroffensive, Phase IV
- Counteroffensive, Phase V
- Counteroffensive, Phase VI
- Tet 69/Counteroffensive
- Summer-Fall 1969
- Winter-Spring 1970
- Sanctuary Counteroffensive
- Counteroffensive, Phase VII

=== Southwest Asia ===
- Defense of Saudi Arabia
- Liberation and Defense of Kuwait
- Cease-Fire

=== War on terrorism ===
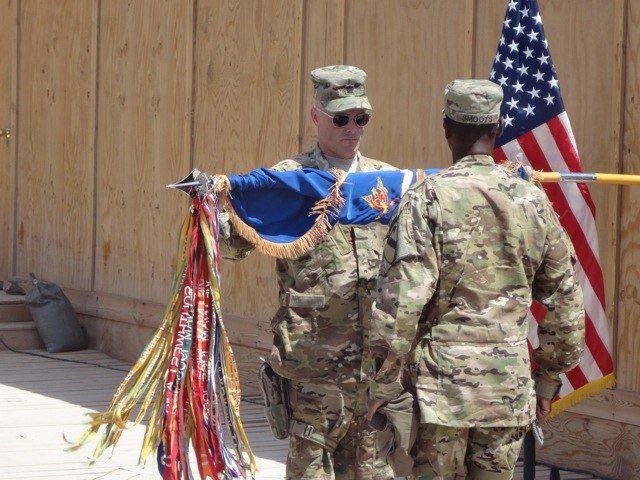
The BN CDR and CSM uncase the colors at FOB Sharana, Afghanistan on 24 Jun 2011

==== Iraq ====
- Liberation of Iraq (pending)
- Transition of Iraq
- Iraqi Governance
- National Resolution (pending)
- Iraqi Sovereignty (pending)

==== Afghanistan ====
- OEF XIV
- Consolidation III
- Transition I
