= Farida Kuchi =

Afghan politician

Farida Kuchi فریده کوچي

Personal details
- Born: 1964 (age 61–62) Balkh province, Afghanistan
- Occupation: nomad herder, activist, politician

Farida Kuchi (Pashto: فریده کوچي) is a politician from Afghanistan's nomadic Kuchi tribe.

Kuchi has described being married at approximately seven years of age, and bearing her first child at approximately twelve years old. She is illiterate, and doesn't know her exact age. Gall described Kuchi as standing just four foot six inches tall, and how her face and hands were covered in traditional tattoos.

In an August 2005 interview with Carlotta Gall, of The New York Times , Farida described losing her husband and some of her children, and all her family's livestock, and ending up in an impromptu refugee camp outside of Mazari Sharif. She described her struggle to deliver a petition requesting aid for her and 1000 other nomads stranded in an impromptu refugee to then Governor of Balkh Province Noorullah Noori as her first political act.

In 2005 and 2010 she was a candidate for Afghanistan's Wolesi Jirga, the lower house of its national legislature. Ten seats were set aside for the nomadic Kuchis. Three of those seats were set aside for women. Six other Kuchi women competed for those seats.

In September 2005, The Daily Telegraph described how Parween Durani, another candidate, complained to voters that Farida had an offensive body odour. The Telegraph described Fareeda turning this insult into an advantage, reminding them that, like all traditional Kuchis, her family's sole heating and cooking fuel was animal dung.

In 2010 she stood sixth among the female candidates, winning 147 votes. Hamida Ahmadzai won 4078 votes, Helay Irshad won 1774 votes, Parween Duran won 1201 votes.

Farida was selected to serve in the Meshrano Jirga, the upper house of Afghanistan's national legislature, in 2010.
