= Kajai =

Village in Bakesh-e Yek, Fars, Iran

Kajai (Persian: كجايي, also romanized as Kajā’ī; also known as Bajmīn) is a village in Bakesh-e Yek Rural District, in the Central District of Mamasani County, Fars province, Iran. At the 2006 census, its population was 180, in 44 families.
