= Fozil (given name) =

Fozil is masculine given name of Arabic origin, a variant of Fazil. Notable people with the name include:

- Fozil Amirov (1914–1979), Soviet Uzbek scientist
- Fozil Musaev (born 1989), Uzbek footballer
