= Taliban Five =

2002–2014 Afghan prisoners of the US in Guantanamo Bay

The Taliban Five were five Afghan detainees at Guantanamo Bay and former high-ranking members of the Taliban government of Afghanistan who, after being held since 2002, indefinitely without charges, were exchanged in 2014 for United States Army sergeant Bowe Bergdahl.

For several years there were rumors that the Obama presidency's negotiations with the Taliban hinged over the release of these men. The Taliban wanted the men to be sent to Qatar. The United States was reported to be considering freeing them if the Taliban would release Bowe Bergdahl, a soldier the Taliban had been holding since 2009. The Taliban Five were released to custody in Doha, Qatar, on June 1, 2014. Bergdahl, upon his release, was tried by general court-martial on charges of desertion, pleaded guilty, and was sentenced to be dishonorably discharged.

The Taliban Five had been described as "the hardest of the hard-core" by John McCain and James Franklin Jeffrey. All five were deemed "high" risk to the United States and were recommended for "continued detention". This reversed a position McCain held only four months earlier. McCain said his stance had changed only because the previous proposal was to release five "hard-core" Taliban leaders as a "confidence-building measure". The subsequent proposal was to be an actual exchange of prisoners. "I would be inclined to support such a thing, depending on a lot of details," he said. The Wall Street Journal described the identity of the five men as an "open secret", since members of Congress had been briefed on the negotiations.

The Taliban Five were involved in peace talks to end the conflict in Afghanistan with the U.S. in March 2019.

== Members of the Taliban Five ==
The Taliban Five were listed as very dangerous men by the United States.

ISN	Image	Allegations
004		According to US intelligence officials, Abdul Haq Wasiq was deputy chief of the Taliban regime's intelligence service. Wasiq had direct access to Taliban and Hezb-e-Islarni Gulbuddin leaders, and was "central to the Taliban's efforts to form alliances with other Islamic fundamentalist groups to fight alongside the Taliban against US and Coalition forces after the 11 September 2001 attacks".
006		According to US intelligence officials, Norullah Noori served as the governor of Balkh and Laghman provinces in the Taliban regime. He was a senior Taliban military commander in Mazar-e-Sharif. Noori is "wanted by the United Nations for possible war crimes including the murder of thousands of Shiite Muslims" along with Fazl. According to Barnett Rubin, they were "responsible for ethno-sectarian massacres in northern Afghanistan" along with their enemies. The Times of Oman described Norullah Nori as "the most controversial" of the five.
007		According to US intelligence officials, Mohammad Fazl served as Chief of Staff of the Taliban Army. He was associated with terrorist groups opposing US and Coalition forces. According to documents from the Joint Task Force Guantánamo, Fazl is "wanted by the UN for possible War crimes including the murder of thousands of Shiites". The document stated Fazl has become a recruiting symbol for the Taliban.
579		According to US intelligence officials, Khairullah Khairkhwa was the interior minister under the Taliban. He helped found the Taliban in 1994. He was directly associated with Osama bin Laden and Taliban Supreme Commander Mullah Muhammad Omar. Likely involved with militant training, he was also "a narcotics trafficker and probably used his position and influences to become one of the major opium drug lords in Western Afghanistan", and probably used profits from drugs to promote Taliban interests. The Times of Oman described Khairkhwa as a "relative moderate".
832		According to US intelligence officials, Mohammad Nabi Omari was the Taliban's chief of communications. Nabi had "operational ties to Anti-Coalition Militia (ACM) groups including al-Qaeda, the Taliban, the Haqqani Network, and the Hezb-e-Islami Gulbuddin". He also "maintained weapons caches and facilitated the smuggling of fighters and weapons".

== Taliban Five prisoner exchange ==
Over the years, there were several premature reports of some or all of the men being transferred. On January 10, 2012, Iranian news sources asserted three of the five men had been transferred, in return for Bergdahl. On July 29, 2013, Ynetnews reported that the USA had already released the five men as a goodwill gesture without insisting on the Taliban in turn releasing Bergdahl.

On May 31, 2014, following negotiations coordinated by the government of Qatar, the five detainees were exchanged for Bergdahl, who was thought to be the last remaining American prisoner of war. The Taliban five were taken from Guantanamo Bay and flown by a C-17 Globemaster III to Qatar, where they were required to remain for a year as a condition of their release. They arrived in Qatar on June 1, 2014. A portion of an edited video of Bergdahl's handover released by the Taliban on June 4, 2014, shows the homecoming of the prisoners in an unknown location in Qatar where a caravan of SUVs pulls over alongside a busy stretch of road with the former prisoners exiting and hugging their supporters. The video portion was mixed with joyful Jihadi song. In late-May 2015, the travel ban was extended while negotiations continue between Qatar and the United States.

== Internal debate over Taliban Five prisoner release ==
According to Time, Pentagon officials and the intelligence community had successfully fought off releasing the Taliban Five in the past; President Barack Obama's move to release the prisoners was described as a "victory" for those at the White House and the State Department who had argued against the military.

In January 2015, several commentators repeated assertions that US officials who insisted on anonymity had said that one of the five men had tried to contact the Haqqani faction, from Qatar. These commentators, citing this anonymous report, asserted that at least one of the five men was a "recidivist". On February 2, 2014, the Oman Tribune quoted Khalid bin Mohammad Al Attiyah Qatar's Foreign Minister denials of these reports.

Attiya assured the public that Omani and US officials were cooperating in monitoring that the men were complying with the terms of the agreement that allowed them to travel to Qatar, and there had been no sign that any of the men had taken any steps that would violate that agreement.
