= Bowe Bergdahl =

Former American soldier who was captured by the Taliban after leaving his post

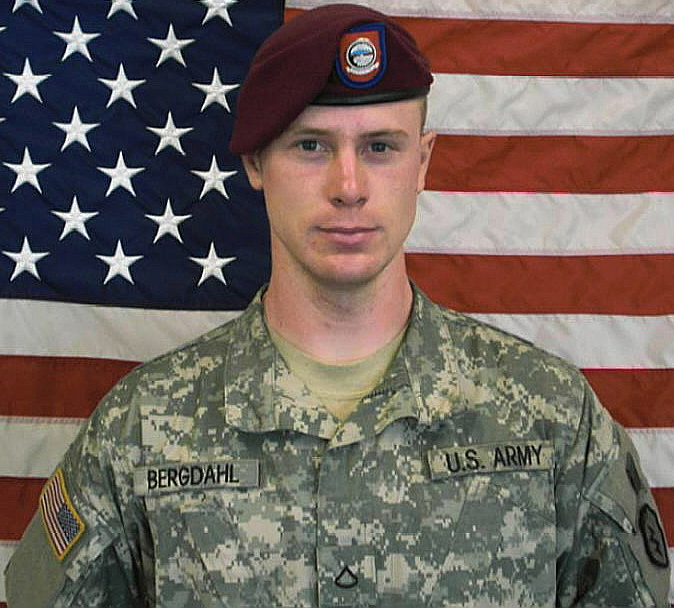
- Bergdahl in the 2000s
- Born: Beaudry Robert Bergdahl; March 28, 1986 (age 40); Sun Valley, Idaho, U.S.
- Military career
- Branch: U.S. Army (2008–2021); U.S. Coast Guard (2006, 26 days)
- Rank: Private
- Units: Blackfoot Company, 1st Battalion, 501st Infantry Regiment, 4th Brigade Combat Team (Airborne), 25th Infantry Division; United States Army North (Fifth Army)
- Conflicts: War in Afghanistan (surrendered)

Beaudry Robert "Bowe" Bergdahl (born March 28, 1986) is a former United States Army soldier who was held captive from 2009 to 2014 by the Taliban-aligned Haqqani network in Afghanistan and Pakistan.

Bergdahl was captured after leaving his post on June 30, 2009. The circumstances under which Bergdahl went missing and how he was captured by the Taliban have since become subjects of intense media scrutiny. He was released on May 31, 2014, as part of a prisoner exchange for five high ranking Taliban members who were being held at the detention center at Guantanamo Bay.

Bergdahl was tried by general court-martial on charges of desertion and misbehavior before the enemy, and on October 16, 2017, he entered a guilty plea before a military judge at Fort Bragg, North Carolina. On November 3, 2017, he was sentenced to be dishonorably discharged, reduced in rank to private and fined $1,000 per month from his pay for ten months, with no prison time. The fine and reduction in rank took effect immediately, while the discharge was stayed pending appeals to the Army Court of Criminal Appeals and later to the Court of Appeals for the Armed Forces, which affirmed the sentence on August 27, 2020. Bergdahl then filed in the United States District Court for the District of Columbia to have a U.S. federal judge review his sentence. On July 25, 2023, the judge issued a ruling that voided his 2017 court-martial conviction. On September 1, 2026, the court-martial conviction was reaffirmed.

== Early life and education ==
Bergdahl was born on March 28, 1986, in Sun Valley, Idaho. He is of Norwegian and Swedish ancestry. He has an older sister. Both Bergdahl and his sister were home schooled by their mother in Hailey, Idaho. The family attended Sovereign Redeemer Presbyterian Church, an Orthodox Presbyterian Church.

Bergdahl received a GED certificate through the College of Southern Idaho. As an adult, Bergdahl studied and practiced fencing and martial arts before changing to ballet classes at the Sun Valley Ballet School in Ketchum, Idaho. He spent time in a Buddhist monastery between 2007 and 2008.

== Military career ==
In 2006, Bergdahl entered basic training in the United States Coast Guard but was discharged after twenty-six days for psychological reasons, receiving an "uncharacterized discharge" as an entry-level separation.

In 2008, Bergdahl enlisted in the United States Army and graduated from the Infantry School, Alpha Company, 2-58 at Fort Benning, Georgia. He was then assigned to the 1st Battalion, 501st Infantry Regiment, 4th Brigade Combat Team, 25th Infantry Division, based at Fort Richardson, Alaska.

According to a fellow soldier, Specialist Jason Fry, Bergdahl, whom Fry described as a loner but "focused and well-behaved", told him before deploying to Afghanistan: "If this deployment is lame, I'm just going to walk off into the mountains of Pakistan." Instead of socializing with his comrades during Thanksgiving, he studied maps of Afghanistan.

Bergdahl's unit deployed to outpost Mest-Malak in May 2009, where they conducted counterinsurgency operations. Bergdahl began learning to speak Pashto and, according to Fry, "to gravitate away from his unit [spending] more time with the Afghans than he did with his platoon". Bergdahl's father described his son to military investigators as "psychologically isolated".

=== Before capture ===
On June 25, 2009, Bergdahl's battalion suffered its first casualty: First Lieutenant Brian Bradshaw was killed by a roadside bomb near the village of Yaya Kheyl, not far from Bergdahl's outpost. Bergdahl's father believes that Bradshaw and Bergdahl had grown close at the National Training Center and that Bradshaw's death darkened Bergdahl's mood.

==== Last e-mail to parents ====
On June 27, 2009, Bergdahl sent an e-mail to his parents before he was captured:

mom, dad The future is too good to waste on lies. And life is way too short to care for the damnation of others, as well as to spend it helping fools with their ideas that are wrong. I have seen their ideas and I am ashamed to even be american. The horror of the self-righteous arrogance that they thrive in [...] is all revolting. [...] [Three good sergeants had been forced to move to another company] [...] and one of the biggest shit bags is being put in charge of the team. [...] [My battalion commander was] a conceited old fool. [...] In the US army you are cut down for being honest ... but if you are a conceited brown nosing shit bag you will be allowed to do [whatever] you want, and you will be handed your higher rank ... The system is wrong. I am ashamed to be an american. And the title of US soldier is just the lie of fools. ... The US army is the biggest joke the world has to laugh at. It is the army of liars, backstabbers, fools, and bullies. The few good SGTs are getting out as soon as they can, [...] I am sorry for everything here. These people need help, yet what they get is the most conceited country in the world telling them that they are nothing and that they are stupid, that they have no idea how to live ... We don't even care when we hear each other talk about running their children down in the dirt streets with our armored trucks ... We make fun of them in front of their faces, and laugh at them for not understanding we are insulting them [...] I am sorry for everything. The horror that is america is disgusting. There are a few more boxes coming to you guys. Feel free to open them, and use them.

Bob Bergdahl responded to his son's final message not long after he received it:

OBEY YOUR CONSCIENCE!

Dear Bowe, In matters of life and death, and especially at war, it is never safe to ignore ones' conscience. Ethics demands obedience to our conscience. It is best to also have a systematic oral defense of what our conscience demands. Stand with like minded men when possible.

Dad.

==== Last communication with platoon ====
A former senior military officer briefed on the investigation into Bergdahl's disappearance stated that on the night he went missing, Bergdahl left a note. The existence of such a note was disputed by the Obama administration during a meeting with Congress on the release of Bergdahl, according to Senator Saxby Chambliss.

In his sworn statement, Bergdahl denied leaving a note. Investigating officer Major General Kenneth Dahl acknowledged that there was no evidence of him leaving a note.

== Captivity ==
=== Circumstances of Bergdahl's disappearance ===
Observation Post Mest in Paktika Province, where Bergdahl was captured

Bergdahl walked away from his battalion on the night of June 30, 2009, at observation post (OP) Mest near the town of Yahya Kheyl in Paktika Province. Accounts of his capture differ. In a video, Bergdahl said he was captured when he fell behind on a patrol. Taliban sources allege he was ambushed after becoming drunk off base; U.S. military sources deny that claim, stating, "The Taliban are known for lying and what they are claiming [is] not true." A Department of Defense spokesperson said, "I'm glad to see he appears unharmed, but again, this is a Taliban propaganda video. They are exploiting the soldier in violation of international law."

Other sources said Bergdahl walked off base after his shift or that he was grabbed from a latrine. In 2009, the U.S. Department of Defense attributed his disappearance to "walking off his base in eastern Afghanistan with three Afghan counterparts and was believed to have been taken prisoner".

General Nabi Mullakheil of the Afghan National Police said the capture occurred in Paktika Province. Other sources say that he was captured by a Taliban group led by Mullah Sangeen Zadran, who moved him to Ghazni Province. He was held by the Haqqani network, an insurgent group affiliated with the Taliban, probably somewhere in Pakistan.

Bergdahl was a Private First Class when captured; he was promoted in absentia to Specialist on June 19, 2010, and to Sergeant on June 17, 2011. According to soldiers in Bergdahl's platoon, the morning when Bergdahl was discovered to be missing, his equipment was found neatly stacked, with his compass missing.

A Pentagon investigation in 2010 concluded that Bergdahl walked away from his unit. Bergdahl had written (prior to his departure) e-mails to his parents in which he reported having become disillusioned with the war effort and bothered by the treatment of Afghans by American soldiers. He said in his e-mail he was ashamed to be American.

Chairman of the Joint Chiefs of Staff Martin Dempsey said: "The questions about this particular soldier's conduct are separate from our effort to recover any U.S. service member in enemy captivity" and that the military will investigate how Bergdahl was captured. "Like any American, he is innocent until proven guilty. [...] Our Army's leaders will not look away from misconduct if it occurred. In the meantime, we will continue to care for him and his family."

Some soldiers who had served with Bergdahl have called him a deserter.

Nathan Bradley Bethea, a member of Bergdahl's battalion, wrote a Daily Beast article stating that there was no patrol the night that Bergdahl went missing and that Bergdahl had talked about his desire to walk to India. Bethea wrote that the brigade received an order not to discuss Bergdahl due to safety reasons, but since he had been found there was no need for further silence. Cody Full, a member of Bergdahl's platoon, said, "He knowingly deserted and put thousands of people in danger because he did. We swore to an oath and we upheld ours. He did not." Full said that Bergdahl had mailed his computer and other possessions home prior to his disappearance.

=== Contacts by Taliban ===
On July 18, 2009, the Taliban released a video showing Bergdahl, who appeared downcast and frightened. A Department of Defense statement issued the following day confirmed that Bergdahl had been declared "missing/whereabouts unknown" on July 1 and that his status had been changed to "missing/captured" on July 3.

In the twenty-eight–minute video, his captors held up his dog tags to establish that the captured man was Bergdahl. Bergdahl gave the date as July 14 and mentioned an attack that occurred that day.

On December 25, 2009, five months after Bergdahl's disappearance, the media arm of the Taliban released a video of "a U.S. soldier captured in Afghanistan" entitled "One of Their People Testified".

The Taliban did not name the American, but the only U.S. soldier known to be in captivity was Bergdahl. U.S. military officials had been searching for Bergdahl, but it was not publicly known whether he was being held in Afghanistan or in Pakistan. On December 25, another video was released showing Bergdahl wearing sunglasses, a combat uniform, and helmet.

The Taliban originally demanded the release of six Taliban prisoners. After Taliban commander Awal Gul died of a heart attack at Guantanamo Bay on February 2, 2011, the demand was reduced to five Taliban prisoners.

On April 7, 2010, the Taliban released a third video depicting Bergdahl, pleading for the release of Afghan prisoners held at Guantanamo and Bagram. In November 2010, Bergdahl appeared briefly in a fourth video. In May 2011, Bergdahl appeared briefly in a fifth video.

In June 2010, Bergdahl managed to escape his captors but was recaptured after less than nine days. In August 2010, it was reported that a Taliban commander named Haji Nadeem had claimed that Bergdahl was helping to train the Taliban in bomb-making and infantry tactics. The Pentagon dismissed the reports as Taliban propaganda.

In June 2013, Bergdahl's parents received a letter from him through the Red Cross.

In January 2014, the United States received another proof-of-life video dated December 14, 2013, in which Bergdahl mentioned the death of South African former president Nelson Mandela, indicating the video had been recorded after December 5.

In early 2014, it was suggested in some media that the United States government had attempted to secure the release of Bergdahl by paying a ransom and that the intermediary had absconded with the money. The Pentagon said no ransom was paid but that a payment had been made for intelligence that led to Bergdahl's release.

=== Search efforts ===
After Bergdahl was confirmed as missing, the Army initiated a DUSTWUN search to find him. According to soldiers from his platoon, there was an increase in attacks against US forces in Paktika Province following his disappearance. Significant resources were deployed in an effort to find Bergdahl. Two Pashto-language leaflets were distributed by the U.S. military in seeking Bergdahl. One showed a smiling GI shaking hands with Afghan children, with a caption that called him a guest in Afghanistan. The other showed a door being broken down and threatened that those holding Bergdahl would be hunted down.

According to soldiers involved in the effort to find Bergdahl, at least six soldiers from his battalion were killed during the search. Retired general Michael Flynn also blamed their deaths on the search for him. National Guard Master Sgt. Mark Allen was on a mission to gather information about Bergdahl from two Afghan villages in July 2009 when his unit was ambushed by insurgents using small arms, machine guns and rocket-propelled grenades. Allen, who was shot in the head, was permanently disabled from the wound, leaving him unable to walk or speak. He died on October 12, 2019.

Officers who served in Afghanistan during that time told CNN that diverting resources to find Bergdahl delayed the closing of Combat Outpost Keating, where eight American soldiers were killed on October 3, 2009, when 300 Taliban insurgents overran the base.

=== Torture in captivity ===
According to a senior U.S. official, Bergdahl told military officials that he had been tortured, beaten, and held in a cage by his captors after he tried to escape. He told medical officials that he was locked in a metal cage in total darkness for weeks at a time as punishment for trying to escape.

== Release ==
Afghanistan
- Khost Province, where Bergdahl was released
- Coordinates: 33.3°N 69.9°E

On May 31, 2014, Bergdahl was released by his captors and recovered by Delta Force, a special mission unit component of the Joint Special Operations Command in eastern Afghanistan. The release was brokered with the Taliban by the American, Qatari, and Afghan governments, in exchange for five Guantanamo Bay detainees transferred to Qatari custody for at least one year. At 10:30 a.m. (EDT) on May 31, 2014, Bergdahl was handed over by 18 Taliban members to a special operations team in eastern Afghanistan, near Khost on the Pakistani border, in what was described as a "peaceful handover". A video of the handover was later released by the Taliban.

Bergdahl was treated by U.S. military medical staff at an undisclosed base in eastern Afghanistan. He was then transferred to Bagram Airfield before being flown to Landstuhl Regional Medical Center in Germany, for medical treatment. On June 13, 2014, he was flown by military plane to San Antonio, Texas, where he was taken to Brooke Army Medical Center to complete his recovery and reintegration.

The Taliban detainees – known as the "Taliban Five" – who were transferred from Guantanamo Bay, Cuba, to custody in Doha, Qatar, are Mohammad Fazl, Khairullah Khairkhwa, Abdul Haq Wasiq, Norullah Noori, and Mohammad Nabi Omari. They were the Taliban army chief of staff, a Taliban deputy minister of intelligence, a former Taliban interior minister, and two other senior Taliban figures.

Some Republican members of Congress have said that the prisoner swap that led to Bergdahl's release may have been illegal. The National Defense Authorization Act for Fiscal Year 2014 (NDAA) mandates that all prisoner transfers from Guantanamo Bay require 30 days' notice to Congress, which was not done in this case. When President Barack Obama signed the bill, he released a signing statement saying that the restriction interfered with the president's executive power as commander-in-chief.

The White House released a statement acknowledging that the release of the Guantanamo prisoners did not comply with the NDAA provision, but cited the president's signing statement and "unique and exigent circumstances" as justification.

=== Release efforts ===
For months, U.S. negotiators sought to arrange the transfer of five Taliban detainees held at Guantanamo Bay detention camp to the Persian Gulf state of Qatar. The transfer was intended as one of a series of confidence-building measures designed to open the door to political talks between the Taliban and Afghan President Hamid Karzai's government. That move – at the center of U.S. strategy for ending the long, costly conflict in Afghanistan – was supposed to lead directly to Bergdahl's release. The Taliban has consistently called for the United States to release those held at Guantanamo Bay in exchange for freeing Western prisoners. But the Guantanamo transfer proposal ground to a halt when the Taliban rejected U.S. conditions designed to ensure transferred Taliban would not slip away and re-emerge as military leaders. Ultimately, the Obama administration agreed to the prisoner exchange, allowing Bergdahl to be released on May 31, 2014.

=== White House Rose Garden ceremony ===
On May 31, 2014, President Obama appeared with Bob and Jani Bergdahl in the White House Rose Garden where he spoke about the prisoner swap that resulted in the recovery of their son.

=== Return to duty ===
On July 13, 2014, it was reported that Bergdahl would return to duty at Fort Sam Houston in San Antonio, Texas. This was confirmed by Army officials on July 14, with a spokeswoman saying that "He will now return to regular duty within the command where he can contribute to the mission." In 2015, he was serving as a clerk; however, the "military taboo surrounding desertion is such that he had to have a security detail to guard him from possible attacks from his fellow soldiers."

=== Debate over negotiations ===
Mike Rogers, chairman of the House Intelligence Committee said he was "extremely troubled" and that "This fundamental shift in U.S. policy signals to terrorists around the world a greater incentive to take U.S. hostages". This sentiment was repeated by Congressmen Buck McKeon and James Inhofe, who released a joint statement saying that terrorists now have a "strong incentive" to capture more soldiers. Ted Poe, chairman of the House Foreign Affairs Subcommittee on Terrorism, Nonproliferation, and Trade, said the Bergdahl exchange appeared to violate the United States policy of not negotiating with terrorists. Anderson Cooper asked White House spokesman Jay Carney if it can "still be said that the United States does not negotiate with terrorists" to which Carney replied:

It can be ... because when you put on the uniform of the United States and you go and fight on behalf of your country in a foreign land at war, and you're taken captive by the enemy, the principle that we don't leave our men and women behind doesn't have an asterisk attached to it depending on who's holding you.

Cooper followed up by asking "Even if it was a group like Al Qaeda, there would be negotiations with them?" to which Carney replied:

What I'm saying is he was a prisoner in an armed conflict, and we were engaged in an effort for five years to try to recover him. As an admiral said on TV today, he said when one of your shipmates goes overboard, you go get them. You don't ask whether he jumped or he was pushed or he fell. You go get him first and then you find out.

Secretary of Defense Chuck Hagel said Bergdahl was a "prisoner of war" and that "We didn't negotiate with terrorists". Time magazine published an article stating that the Taliban are:

[N]ot really a 'terrorist' enemy as we commonly understand the word. The group is not on the State Department's official list of terrorist organizations and has long been a battlefield enemy in the ground war for control of Afghanistan. It is not plotting to, say, hijack American airplanes—even if it does have sympathies with people who are. Ditto the Taliban leaders released over the weekend.

Time pointed out that the United States and other countries have "negotiated with terrorists" multiple times in previous years. In February 2014, CNN published an article discussing the possibility of releasing Bergdahl in exchange for the five Taliban, and concluded that "discussions about the release of Bergdahl with the Afghan Taliban are not directly with a terrorist organization per se, but instead with an insurgent group that has a terrorist wing".

In August 2014, the Government Accountability Office published a report stating that the Pentagon broke the law when conducting the prisoner exchange because it failed to notify U.S. Congress in advance, as required by the law.

National Security Advisor Susan Rice appeared on ABC News' This Week on June 1, 2014, several days after the exchange, saying Bergdahl "served the United States with honor and distinction." Following the announcement that Bergdahl was formally charged with desertion and misbehavior before the enemy, much debate regarding the administration's handling of the negotiations resumed, centered on Rice's comment and then-State Department spokeswoman Jen Psaki's statement in late March 2015 that the swap was "absolutely" worth it.

In September 2014, the U.S. House of Representatives voted 249 to 163 (with 22 Democrats joining the Republican majority) to pass a nonbinding resolution condemning President Obama for failing to give Congress thirty days' notice before exchanging Bergdahl.

== Court-martial, conviction, appeal, and reinstatement of conviction ==
=== Investigation, court-martial, and conviction ===
On June 16, 2014, the U.S. Army said that it had begun investigating the facts and circumstances surrounding the disappearance and capture of Bergdahl in Afghanistan.

On June 25, 2014, the U.S. Army stated that there is "no evidence" that Bergdahl "engaged in any misconduct" during his years in captivity. The 2010 Pentagon investigation referred to above dealt with events leading up to his capture. In July 2014, Bergdahl was returned to active duty.

In August 2014, it was announced that an investigation headed by Major General Kenneth Dahl would be conducted. During the course of Dahl's inquiry, Bergdahl told investigators that he left his position in June 2009 to report on "misconduct in his unit" and that he had intended to return quickly. During a 59-day investigation, Dahl interviewed 57 witnesses, including Bergdahl.

According to his lawyer, Eugene Fidell, Bergdahl told him that he "had concerns about certain conditions in the unit and things that happened in the unit and he figured that the only way to get any attention to them would be to get that information to a general officer." Fidell opined that Bergdahl was actually AWOL when he was captured, rather than a deserter.

In December 2014, the Army referred Bergdahl's case to a four-star general for a possible court-martial. On March 25, 2015, the Army announced that Bergdahl had been charged with two counts under the Uniform Code of Military Justice: one count of "desertion with intent to shirk important or hazardous duty" and one count of "misbehavior before the enemy by endangering the safety of a command, unit or place"; the second more serious misbehavior charge can be met with a life sentence.

According to documents released by his defense team, Bergdahl was diagnosed with schizotypal personality disorder following an Army Sanity Board evaluation. On July 27, 2015, a memorandum from the sanity board stated "Though Sgt. Bergdahl did have a severe mental disease or defect at the time of the alleged criminal conduct, he was able to appreciate the nature and quality and wrongfulness of this conduct."

In September 2015, following earlier postponements, an Article 32 hearing (similar to a preliminary hearing in the civilian system) was held at Fort Sam Houston, Texas. At the hearing, Dahl testified that he found no evidence suggesting that Bergdahl was "sympathetic to the Taliban" or intended to desert. Dahl also testified that Bergdahl had "idealistic and unrealistic expectations" of people, identifying with Ayn Rand's character of John Galt. Dahl testified that he had found no evidence that any soldiers had been killed while specifically engaged in the effort to retrieve Bergdahl. Dahl also testified that imprisonment would be an "inappropriate" penalty for Bergdahl.

Lieutenant Colonel Mark Visger presided over the hearing and made a recommendation on whether Bergdahl should be court-martialed. In October 2015, Visger "recommended that the charges be referred to a special court-martial and that a punitive discharge and confinement would be inappropriate given all the circumstances." Visger's recommendation was reviewed by General Robert B. Abrams, the commander of United States Army Forces Command at Fort Bragg, North Carolina, the "convening authority" in Bergdahl's case.

In December 2015, Abrams rejected the recommendation and ordered that Bergdahl face a general court-martial on the two charges. His trial was first set for February 2017. Regarding these charges, Bergdahl had sought a pardon from President Obama, which was not granted.

In 2016, Bergdahl's case was the focus of Season 2 of the podcast Serial.

On President Donald Trump's inauguration day, Bergdahl's lawyers sought to use the president's words to end the prosecution. Specifically, Trump had denounced Bergdahl during the presidential campaign as a "dirty rotten traitor". The defense attorneys filed a motion to dismiss the desertion and endangerment charges against Bergdahl, saying it was now impossible for him to get a fair trial. They contended that the effect of President Trump's statements violates a prohibition on unlawful command influence, a legal concept in military justice.

Colonel Jeffery Nance, the military judge presiding over the case, declined to dismiss the case in February 2017; Bergdahl's appeal was denied by the U.S. Army Court of Criminal Appeals in March. His defense team then filed a third motion, again asking to dismiss the case over the comments from Trump. Bergdahl returned to court for a pre-trial hearing on May 5, 2017, where the judge said he intended to start jury selection on October 16, 2017.

On August 21, it was announced that Bergdahl had rejected a trial by jury and chose instead a trial by military judge Colonel Nance. On October 16, 2017, Bergdahl, via his attorney, pleaded guilty to charges of desertion and misbehavior before the enemy. His sentencing hearing was slated to take place on October 23.

On October 23, Nance heard arguments to renew a motion to dismiss the court-martial, citing recent comments by President Trump on October 16. President Trump said that he couldn't comment on the case, and added, "but I think people have heard my comments in the past." Prosecutors claimed that Trump was merely trying to distance himself from his previous remarks about Bergdahl. Sentencing testimony began on October 25.

On November 3, 2017, Nance accepted Bergdahl's guilty plea and sentenced him to be dishonorably discharged, reduced in rank, and fined $1,000 per month from his pay for ten months, with no prison time. The fine and reduction in rank were to take effect immediately, while the discharge was stayed pending automatic appeal. The judge did not give his reasons for the sentence, which was later reviewed by General Robert B. Abrams. As the final sentence included a punitive (dishonorable) discharge, it was reviewed by the United States Army Court of Criminal Appeals.

After the sentencing, President Trump tweeted "The decision on Sergeant Bergdahl is a complete and total disgrace to our Country and to our Military." In June 2018, General Abrams approved the sentence.

On August 28, 2020, his sentence was approved by the Court of Appeals for the Armed Forces.

=== Vacatur and reaffirmation of conviction ===
In February 2021, Bergdahl filed a petition (a collateral attack) in the United States District Court for the District of Columbia to have the conviction and sentence expunged. On August 2, 2021, the Justice Department filed a motion to dismiss Bergdahl's petition.

Sometime later in 2021, Bergdahl was discharged from the Army.

In March 2023 Bergdahl received a partial win in the U.S. District Court case. Senior Judge Reggie Walton partially granted the government's motion to dismiss the case, but he rejected claims that comments from President Trump and Senator John McCain had influenced the military court-martial.

On July 25, 2023, Judge Walton vacated the conviction. The ruling stated that Nance failing to disclose his application for a position at the Justice Department "could create the appearance of potential bias".

On May 29, 2024, the Justice Department appealed Judge Walton’s decision to vacate the conviction.

On September 1, 2026, the U.S. Court of Appeals for the District of Columbia Circuit ruled in the government’s favor in Bergdahl’s collateral challenge to his court-martial conviction. The court held that although Article III courts may conduct collateral review of court-martial proceedings in certain circumstances, such as habeas corpus or claims involving military records and benefits, federal district courts do not have jurisdiction to vacate the court-martial judgment itself. The court reversed the relief previously granted by the district court and remanded with instructions to dismiss the case for lack of jurisdiction.

== Military awards ==
As an infantryman who had engaged in combat with the enemy prior to his capture, Bergdahl was awarded the Combat Infantryman Badge and a total of 10 overseas service bars for the five years he spent in the combat zone in Afghanistan.

His awards and service ribbons include the Army Good Conduct Medal, National Defense Service Medal, Afghanistan Campaign Medal, Global War on Terror Service Medal, Army Service Ribbon, and the Overseas Service Ribbon.

In January 2016, his military lawyer requested the Army award Bergdahl the Purple Heart and the Prisoner of War Medal on the grounds that withholding the medals might prejudice and "cast a semblance of guilt" on Bergdahl as he awaited trial.

After sentencing on November 3, 2017, his civilian attorney indicated that the defense team would still seek to have the Prisoner of War Medal issued to Bergdahl for the five years he spent in captivity.

Combat Infantryman Badge
Army Good Conduct Medal (2 awards)
National Defense Service Medal
Afghanistan Campaign Medal
Global War on Terrorism Service Medal
Army Service Ribbon
Overseas Service Ribbon
Army Superior Unit Award
10 Overseas Service Bars
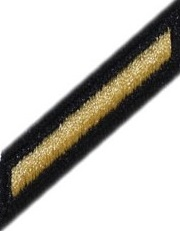
3 service stripes
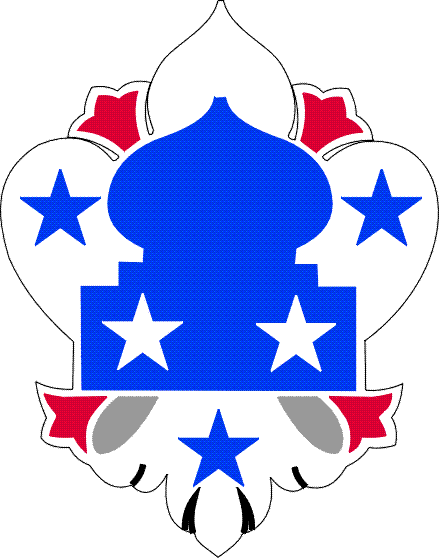
United States Army North Distinctive unit insignia
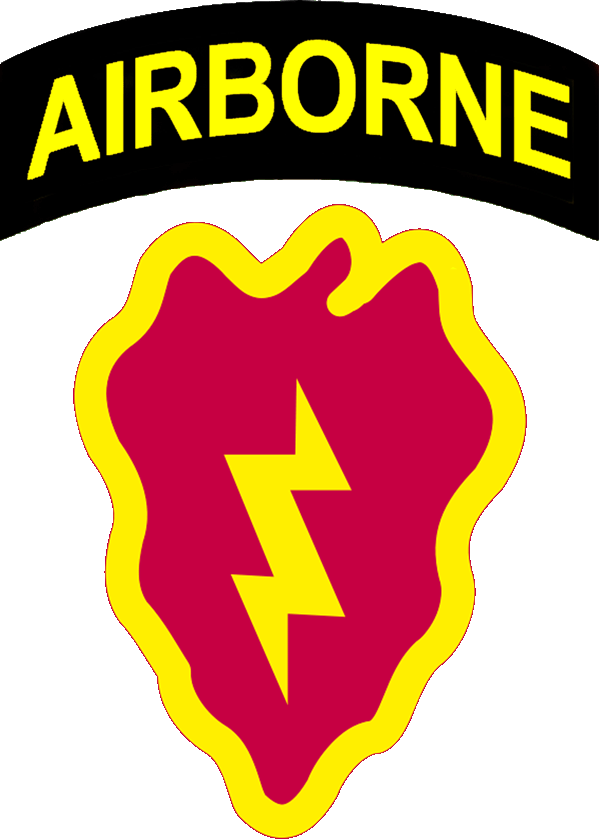
4th Brigade Combat Team (Airborne), 25th Infantry Division Combat service identification badge
