= Unlawful command influence =

Legal concept in United States law regarding military chain of command

Unlawful command influence (UCI) is a legal concept within American military law. UCI occurs when a person bearing "the mantle of command authority" uses or appears to use that authority to influence the outcome of military judicial proceedings. Military commanders typically exert significant control over their units, but under the Uniform Code of Military Justice (UCMJ) a commander must take a detached, quasi-judicial stance towards certain disciplinary proceedings such as a court-martial. Outside of certain formal actions authorized by the UCMJ, a commander using their authority to influence the outcome of a court-martial commits UCI. If UCI has occurred, the results of a court-martial may be legally challenged and in some cases overturned.

== History ==
During World War II, mass mobilization resulted in an unprecedented proportion of the US population serving in the armed forces. Over 2 million courts-martial were performed under the then-governing Articles of War, and large portion of the population was exposed to military justice. The reaction was not positive. The public and Congress perceived the Articles of War to grant too much authority to commanders, with harsh and arbitrary results. Infamously, some commanders would issue reprimands called "skin letters" to members of courts-martial who had been too lenient. Congress enacted the UCMJ to engraft civilian forms of due process into the military justice system, while at the same time maintaining the unique authority of the commander.

Under the new system, commanders retain significant formal powers over the military justice system. They refer charges to courts-martial, choose from among their subordinates to be members of the panel (the jury), and in some cases can overturn guilty verdicts and authorize or waive entirely punishment adjudged at trial. However, courts-martial are now presided over by military judges, and commanders are specifically directed to remain detached from the proceedings through Article 37 of the UCMJ.

== Article 37 ==
Article 37 of the UCMJ is the statutory basis for unlawful command influence. It states, in part:

(a) No authority convening a general, special, or summary court-martial, nor any other commanding officer, may censure, reprimand, or admonish the court or any member, military judge, or counsel thereof, with respect to the findings or sentence adjudged by the court, or with respect to any other exercises of its or his functions in the conduct of the proceedings. No person subject to this chapter may attempt to coerce or, by any unauthorized means, influence the action of a court-martial or any other military tribunal or any member thereof, in reaching the findings or sentence in any case, or the action of any convening, approving, or reviewing authority with respect to his judicial acts.

== Legal test ==
Courts have devised a complex test to sift cases for UCI. First, courts require that the defense produce some evidence to support an allegation of UCI. Once a court is satisfied that the defense has met this "burden of production," responsibility shifts to the government to persuade the court, beyond a reasonable doubt, that the UCI did not prejudice the accused. The government could show 1) the underlying facts did not occur, 2) the facts do not constitute improper influence, or 3) if there was UCI, it did not prejudice the defendant.

== Examples of UCI ==
There are numerous ways that a commander exerts authority, both specifically within the military justice process and over subordinates generally. Each method of asserting authority yields a new way of improperly influencing a judicial proceeding.

=== Abusing formal powers within the military justice system ===
A commander (the convening authority) chooses the panel (the military analogue to a jury). The commander is supposed to make his selection according to neutral factors to ensure that the accused has a "fair and impartial panel" A convening authority commits UCI if he or she, with intent to influence the outcome of the trial, "stacks" the panel through excluding or including members.

=== Abusing commander's general authority ===
The "inherent power and influence of command" creates numerous avenues for unlawful command influence.

Commands can and have committed UCI by:

- directly or indirectly criticizing panel members who find a defendant not guilty or adjudge a "lenient" sentence;
- intimidating or otherwise discouraging witnesses from testifying on behalf of an accused;
- suggesting or directing specific sentences for certain crimes (often through policy letters or public pronouncements);
- publicly humiliating or ostracizing defendants before they have been found guilty;
- sending inquiries to a military judge seeking justification of decisions.

== Typical remedies ==
Although technically UCI is itself punishable under the UCMJ as a violation of regulation, there is no reported case where a commander faced UCMJ action for committing UCI.

Much more likely is an intervention by the military judiciary. Trial and appeals courts have a full gamut of remedies available. For instance, if UCI in the form of prejudicial statements by a commander is discovered during trial, the trial judge may act to "cure" the UCI simply by polling the members of the panel to determine if they had heard the statements or would be influenced by them. A trial judge may direct that a commander must issue a clarifying statement or retraction. Or a trial judge could dismiss charges entirely.

If the issue of UCI is raised at the appellate level, the appellate court has discretion to tailor an appropriate remedy. For instance, if the UCI consisted in statements from a commander that a certain punishment was required if a defendant was found guilty, a court could order a retrial on the issue of sentence only. An appeals court could also order a new trial. In the most extreme cases, a court could reverse the conviction with prejudice, effectively changing a guilty verdict to not guilty.
