= Yahya Kheyl =

Coordinates: 32°56′15″N 68°38′46″E

Yaḩyá Khēl یحیى خل
- Village
- Interactive map of Yaḩyá Khēl
- Country: Afghanistan
- Province: Paktika Province
- Time zone: + 4.30

Yaḩyá Khēl (Pashto: یایاخېل) is a village in Paktika Province, in southeastern-central Afghanistan

== See also ==
- Paktika Province
- Musahiban, an Afghan clan.
- Bowe Bergdahl, American soldier captured by the Taliban near the village.
