= Qari Ahmadullah =

Afghan militant and politician

- قاری احمدالله
- Born: 1975; Qarabagh, Ghazni
- Disappeared: 2002 (aged 22–33); Zadran
- Occupations: Politician, member of Taliban
- Known for: being Taliban's first interior minister in 1996

Qari Ahmadullah (Pashto: قاری احمدالله) (born 1975) was an Afghan militant and the Taliban's Minister of Security (or Intelligence Service) in 1996.

He was responsible for bribing anti-Taliban commanders to desert the ranks of the United Islamic Front for the Salvation of Afghanistan opposition. Ahmadullah also commanded troops fighting on frontlines in the north of the country against the Northern Alliance.

== Background ==
According to the Official Journal of the European Union and the testimony of Abdul Haq Wasiq, before his Combatant Status Review Tribunal, Ahmadullah was the Minister of Security and also Minister of Intelligence and Governor of Takhar Province. Abdul Haq described Ahmadullah as an uneducated man.

== Supposed death ==
He was supposedly killed in the opening days of 2002 in the American airstrike against Mullah Taha's house in Zadran (though the Pentagon was unable to confirm Ahmadullah's death). 12 years after the incident, an investigation by Harper's Weekly alleged Ahmadullah was alive.

== See also ==
- List of people who disappeared mysteriously (2000–present)
