= Kate Clark (journalist) =

British journalist

- Occupation: journalist

Kate Clark is a British journalist. She was based in Kabul, Afghanistan in 1999 as a foreign correspondent. On March 14, 2001, the Taliban ordered her expelled. At that time, she was the only western reporter based full-time in Afghanistan. Her expulsion was seen as a reaction to her reports on the Taliban's destruction of the Buddhist statues at Bamiyan.

The Committee to Protect Journalists condemned the Taliban's expulsion of Clark. It said that since there is no independent domestic press in Afghanistan many Afghans relied on the short-wave broadcasts the BBC transmitted in Dari and Pashto.

Clark continued to report on Afghanistan, from outside its borders, and returned to Kabul on 15 November 2001, after the Taliban retreat.

In September 2002, Clark was able to interview Wakil Muttawakil, the former Taliban Foreign Minister. He told her that he had first heard rumors that Al-Qaeda was planning a large sneak attack in the continental United States, and that he immediately took steps to warn the United States Department of State. Clark described this as a "massive failure of intelligence".

In May 2010, Clark left the BBC and joined the research group Afghanistan Analysts Network.
