= Ibrahim Spinzada =

Afghan politician

Ibrahim spinzada
- Occupation: Politician
- Known for: Hamid Karzai's protege and brother-in-law

Engineer Ibrahim Spinzada is a politician in Afghanistan who had been appointed to several government positions by President Hamid Karzai. In 2004 the Los Angeles Times described Spinzada as Karzai's brother-in-law. The Congressional Research Service also called him "a Karzai brother-in-law", when it reported he was the first deputy adviser on Afghanistan's National Security Council in 2010.

In June 2010, Spinzada was appointed interim director of National Directorate of Security (NDS).

In March 2012 he traveled to Guantanamo Bay detention camp in Cuba to negotiate with the five remaining Taliban leaders held there.

Al Jazeera described him as an associate of Mohammed Ali Salehi, an individual they reported facilitated the illegal transfer of funds from Afghanistan.
