= Mohammad Nabi Omari =

Afghan politician and former Guantanamo Bay detainee

Mawlawi Mohammad Nabi Omari
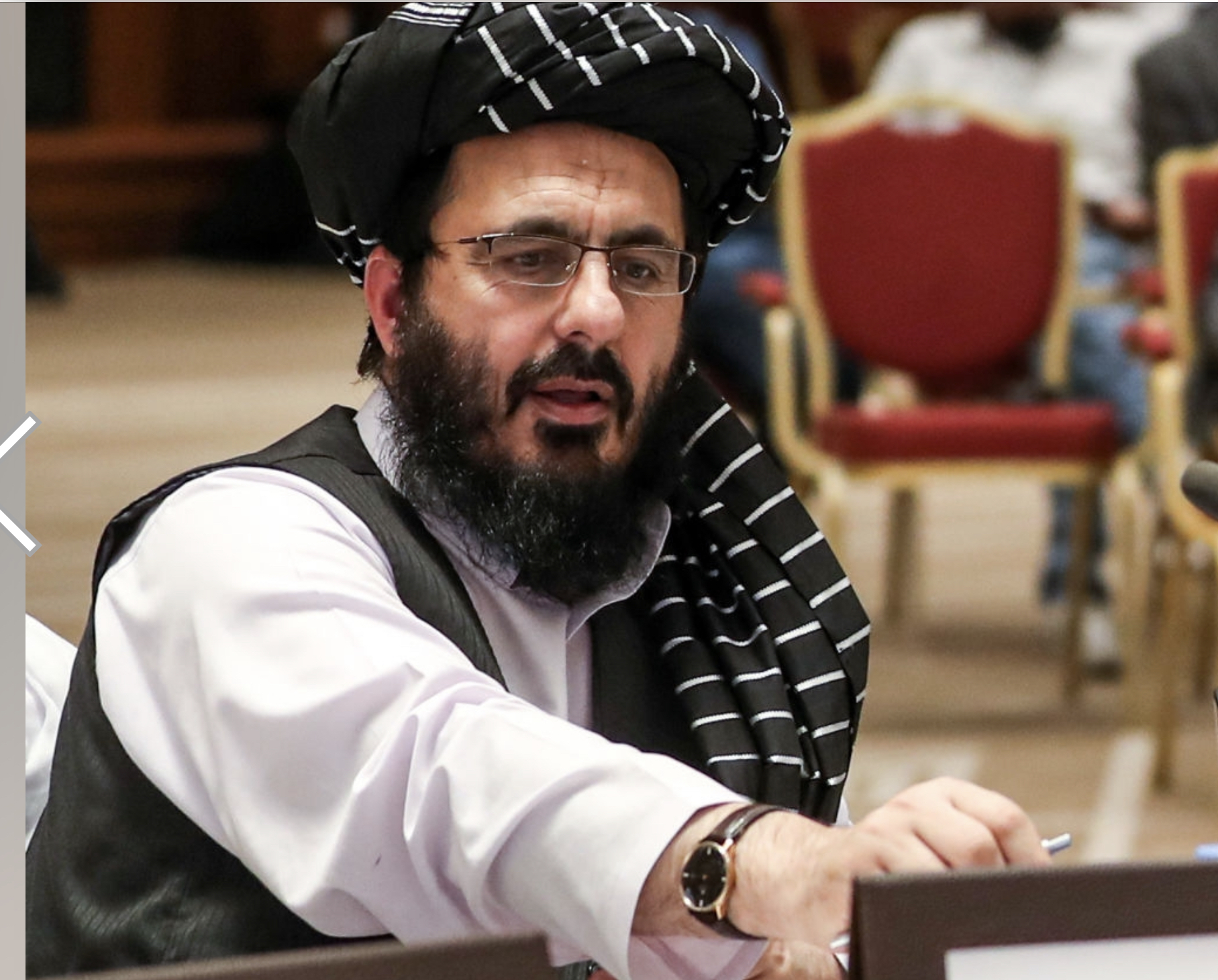
- Nabi Omari at a conference

First Deputy Minister for Interior Affairs
- Incumbent
- Assumed office 6 October 2022
- President: Hibatullah Akhundzada
- Preceded by: Mohmand Katawazaii

Governor of Khost Province
- Incumbent
- Assumed office 24 August 2021
- Preceded by: Mohmand Katawazai

Personal details
- Born: 1968 (age 57–58) Khost Province, Afghanistan
- Profession: Politician

Mawlawi Mohammad Nabi Omari is an Afghan politician serving as First Deputy Minister for Interior Affairs under the internationally unrecognized Taliban regime since 6 October 2022. He was also appointed Acting Governor of Khost Province in late August 2021. Omari was held for nearly twelve years in extrajudicial detention at the United States Guantanamo Bay detainment camps, in Cuba. His Guantanamo Internment Serial Number was 832. American intelligence analysts estimate that he was born in 1968, in Khost, Afghanistan. He arrived at the Guantanamo detention camps on October 28, 2002.

According to scholars at the Brookings Institution, led by Benjamin Wittes, Omari was being held on allegations that he was affiliated with al-Qaeda and the Taliban and that he was part of the Taliban leadership. During his Combatant Status Review Tribunal Omari acknowledged he had worked for the Taliban, but claimed that was prior to the September 11 attacks. He said that after the US invasion, he had been a loyal supporter of the Hamid Karzai government, and that he had been a covert operative for a US intelligence officer he knew only as "Mark". Omari was one of the 71 individuals deemed too innocent to charge, but too dangerous to release by the Joint Review Task Force under the Obama administration.

He was transported from Guantanamo Bay to Qatar on June 1, 2014. Omari and four other men known as the Taliban five were exchanged for captured U.S. soldier Bowe Bergdahl. The men were held by the Qataris in a form of house arrest. The swap was brokered by the Tamim bin Hamad Al Thani, the Emir of Qatar. Omari and the others were required to stay in Qatar for a year as a condition of their release.
