= Afghan Commando Forces =

- قوای کماندوی افغانستان
- Sleeve badge of the Afghan Commando Forces under Democratic Republic of Afghanistan
- Active: 1964–1992
- Disbanded: 28 April 1992; 34 years ago
- Country: Afghanistan
- Branch: Afghan Army
- Type: Airborne forces Commando; Royal guard Special forces
- Size: 3 brigades, 14 battalions and 1 regiment (1989)
- Nicknames: "Champions" (شیرجنگ) "Heroes" (قهرمان) "Triple Six" (666th Commando Battalion)
- Colors: Maroon; Sky Blue; Green
- Equipment: AK47, AKMS with folding metal stocks, RPG-7, 82-BM-37 mortars, DShK, BTR-60, BTR-70
- Engagements: 1970 Pul-e Khishti Mosque Protest; 1973 Afghan coup d'état; 1975 Panjshir Valley uprising; 1975 Laghman uprising; Saur Revolution; 1978 Nuristani rebellion; 1979 uprisings in Afghanistan; Bala Hissar uprising; Soviet–Afghan War; Operation Baikal-79; Storm-333; Siege of Khost; Panjshir offensives; First Battle of Zhawar; Second Battle of Zhawar; Marmoul offensives; Operation Magistral; Operation Typhoon (1989); 1989–1992 Afghan Civil War; Battle of Jalalabad (1989); 1989 Afghan coup attempt; 1990 Afghan coup attempt
- Decorations: Hero of the Democratic Republic of Afghanistan (37th Commando Brigade)

Commanders
- Notable commanders: Shahnawaz Tanai, Rahmatullah Safi

Insignia
- White variant

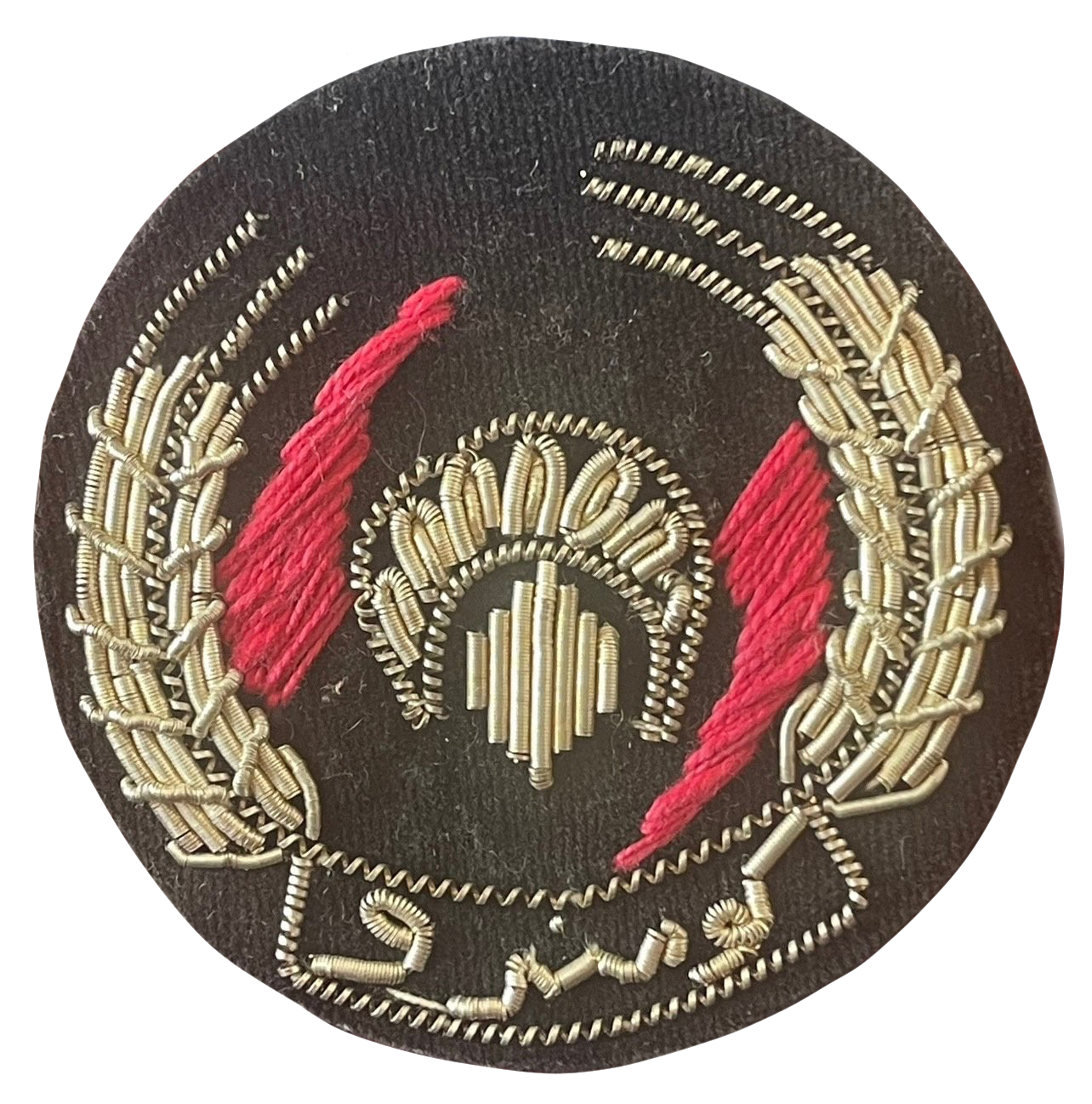
- 242nd Parachute Battalion

- 444th Commando Battalion

Aircraft flown
- Helicopter: Mil Mi-17, Mil Mi-8, Mil Mi-6, Mil Mi-4
- Attack helicopter: Mil Mi-24
- Transport: Antonov An-32, Antonov An-26, Antonov An-24, Antonov An-12

The Afghan Commando Forces (Dari: قوای کماندوی افغانستان, Pashto: افغان کمانډو لړۍ), also referred to as the DRA Commando Forces from 1978 to 1992, were the former combined forces of airborne and heliborne force, commando, royal guard, and special forces of the Afghan Army.

The force was composed of numerous brigades, regiments and battalions initially established by King Mohammad Zahir Shah and Sardar Abdul Wali Khan in 1964 and was disbanded in 1992, following the collapse of the Democratic Republic of Afghanistan in 1992.

== Establishment ==
The history of special forces within the Afghan Armed Forces dates back to early 1964 when the 242nd Parachute Battalion was established as the Royal Afghan Army’s first elite formation which was an independent battalion, subordinate to the General Staff. Sardar Abdul Wali, Commander-in-Chief of the 1st Central Army Corps, son of Sardar Shah Wali Khan and later the corps commander, established the battalion to suppress demonstrations, riots in the capital Kabul, and to prevent potential coup attempts. Command of the battalion was passed down to Capt. Habibullah, who recently completed the Infantry Officers’ Advanced Course and airborne training in Fort Benning, United States and trained with the British Special Air Service. The 242nd Parachute Battalion was stationed in Sherpur Fort, northwest Kabul where they conducted airborne training in Bagram and Jalalabad.

During the summer of 1967, the 444th Commando Battalion was formed by Sardar Abdul Wali, becoming the Royal Afghan Army’s second elite formation and one of the most important commando units in Afghanistan's military history. The battalion was formed out of Wali’s fears of a coup attempt led by Mohammad Daoud Khan, as well as rising opposition to the Afghan monarchy, their role being to prevent coup attempts, riots and political demonstrations in Kabul. The 444th Commando Battalion was commanded by Lt. Col. Aqel Shah, who later passed it to Maj. Rahmatullah Safi, who received training in the British Royal Military Academy Sandhurst and the Soviet Ryazan Higher Airborne Command School. Safi was additionally part of Sardar Abdul Wali’s secret espionage and intelligence network, being described as his “admirer” and “devotee”. By then, the battalion numbered around 1,600 commandos. The battalion was stationed in Bala Hissar fortress in the southern outskirts of Kabul, within 1 kilometre of the Arg Royal Palace, being airborne-qualified and under the control of the 1st Central Army Corps.

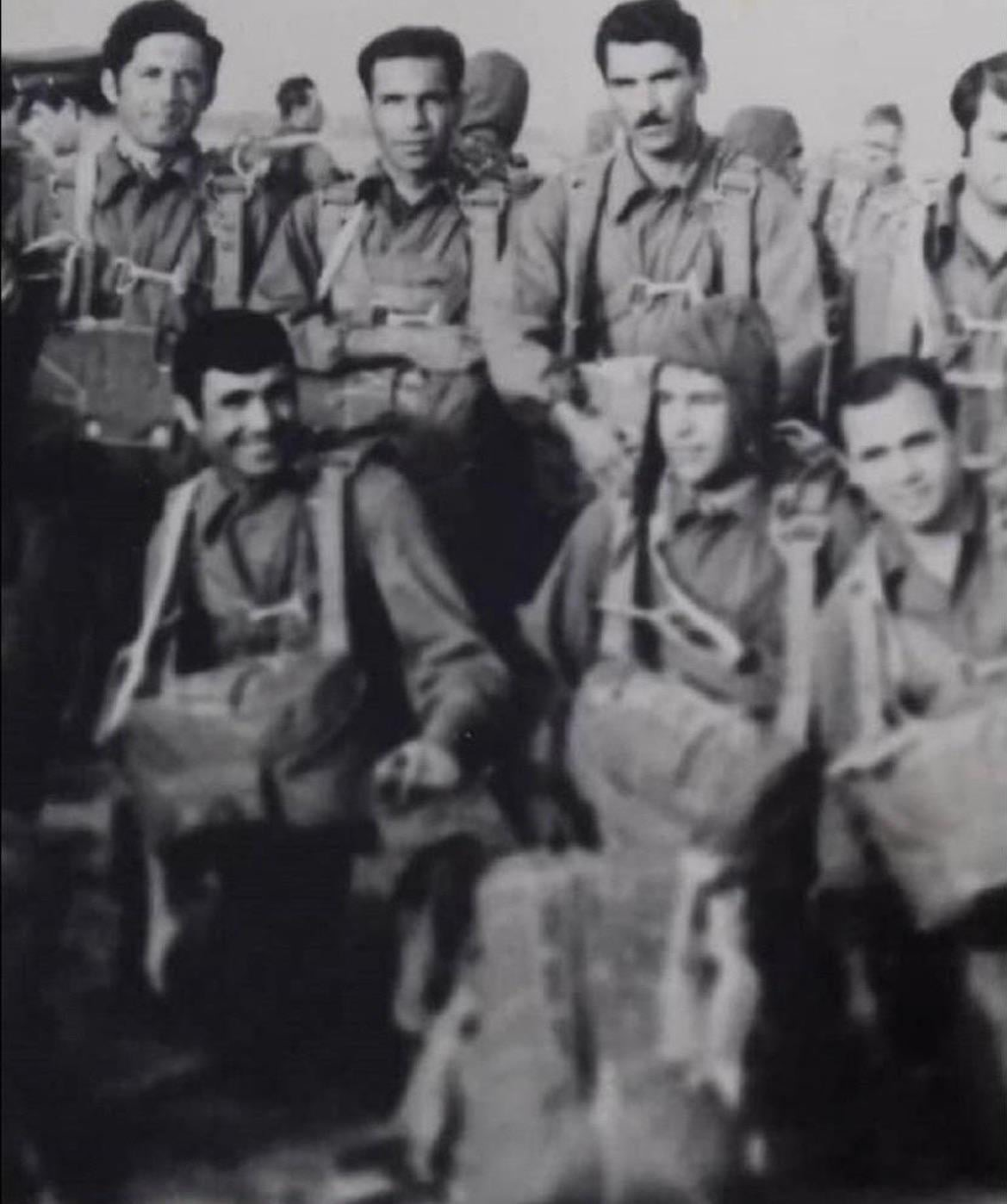
Gul Agha, Faiz Mohammad, Hedayatullah Aziz and Hashem Zadran before parachuting in 1967

To properly accommodate the new commando formations, they were given access to BTR-40 personnel carriers, tanks and other military equipment. Eimal Peroz, son of Gen. Khushal Peroz (who was in the 444th Commando Battalion), also stated they were the first unit in the Royal Afghan Army to use the AK-47 rifle. The early commando and parachute battalion's officer base was primarily made up of the Afghan aristocracy and those close to Sardar Abdul Wali, who feared a potential coup attempt from Mohammad Daoud Khan.

In 1968, the “J course”, an advanced post-graduate paratrooper commando course, was established within the 444th Commando Battalion at Bala Hissar Fortress. Hidayatullah Aziz, who would go on to be the commander of the battalion, volunteered at 25 years old. After an examination by Sardar Abdul Wali, the founder of the Afghan Commando Force, he became one of many participants drawn from the Royal Afghan Army’s officer and non-commissioned officer base.

Ultimately, three graduates of the “J Course” would become deputy commanders of the 444th Commando; Gul Agha, Hidayatullah Aziz and Abdullah Baqi. During this time, the People's Democratic Party of Afghanistan launched a successful recruitment campaign targeted towards participants of the “J Course” (and the Afghan Armed Forces overall) with all three of the deputy commanders being members of the party. Within the commando course, discussions on “liberation” and political philosophies such as progressivism were facilitated by Deputy Commander Gul Agha in secrecy, as many of the commandos in the course were already part of the PDPA.

Under the monarchy of King Mohammad Zahir Shah, the 444th Commando Battalion and the 242nd Parachute Battalion were sent to the Soviet Union to undergo advanced training, more specially, to the Ryazan Higher Airborne Command School. This included the three deputy commanders of the 444th Commando and two non-PDPA members Noor Mohammad and Amir Mohammad. From the 242nd Parachute Battalion, paratrooper Saboor Khuzman and a few other officers were also sent to Ryazan. PDPA party members within the commando force discreetly distributed progressive magazines such as Dunya and Paykar, additionally having maintained contact with Tudeh Party of Iran.

Soldiers of the Afghan Commando Force who were sent to the Soviet Union eventually returned, after having successfully completed training with the Soviet Airborne Forces and receiving diplomas. This included Gul Agha, Hidayatullah Aziz and Faiz Mohammed, who became the Chief of Operations within the 444th Commando Battalion.

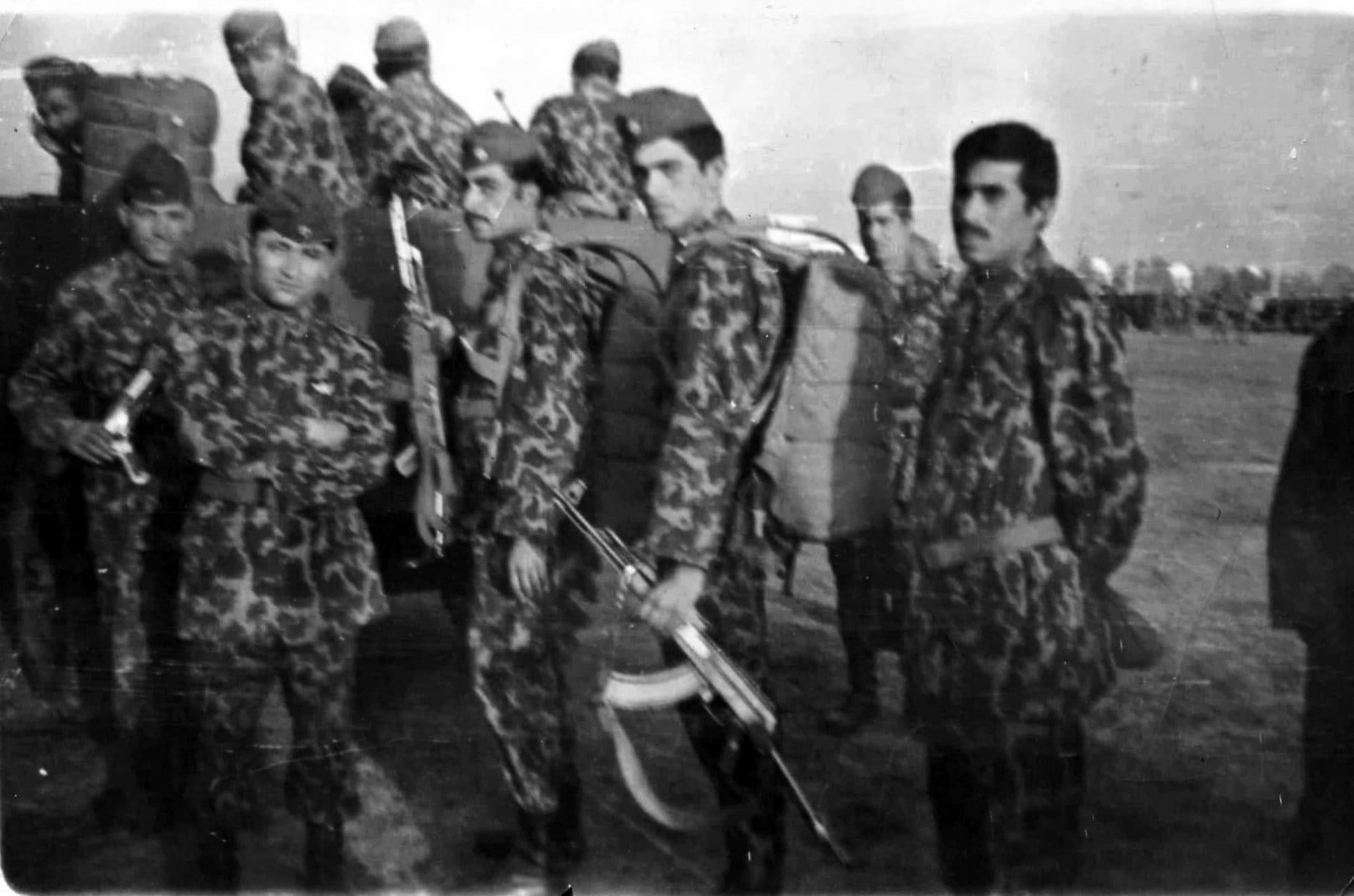
General Khushal Peroz alongside Afghan commandos of the 444th Commando Battalion in Chaman-e-Hozori Park, 1967

=== Uniform specifications ===
Under the reign of Mohammed Zahir Shah, more specifically in 1964, the 242nd Parachute Battalion wore locally produced one-piece olive drab overalls, inspired by those worn by the Soviet Airborne Forces, as well as metal airborne wings with a black cloth backing. They additionally wore a black sleeve badge depicting a silver bullion airborne cap with wheat and red thunderbolts on each side.

In 1967, the 444th Commando Battalion wore the standard khaki Afghan Army uniform, as well as a distinct blue patch with a singular red lightning flash and jump wings with a light blue cloth backing. The Afghan commandos wore Soviet-style pilotkas, adorned with a small metal pin of the Royal Afghan Army’s insignia or a military variant of Afghanistan's national emblem.

The commandos became the first unit in the Afghan Army to use Frog Skin camouflage two-piece uniforms in 1969, initially imported from the Soviet Union. In 1970, paratroopers also resorted to using Frog Skin camouflage. Maroon berets additionally become part of the commando headdress, pulled down to the right.

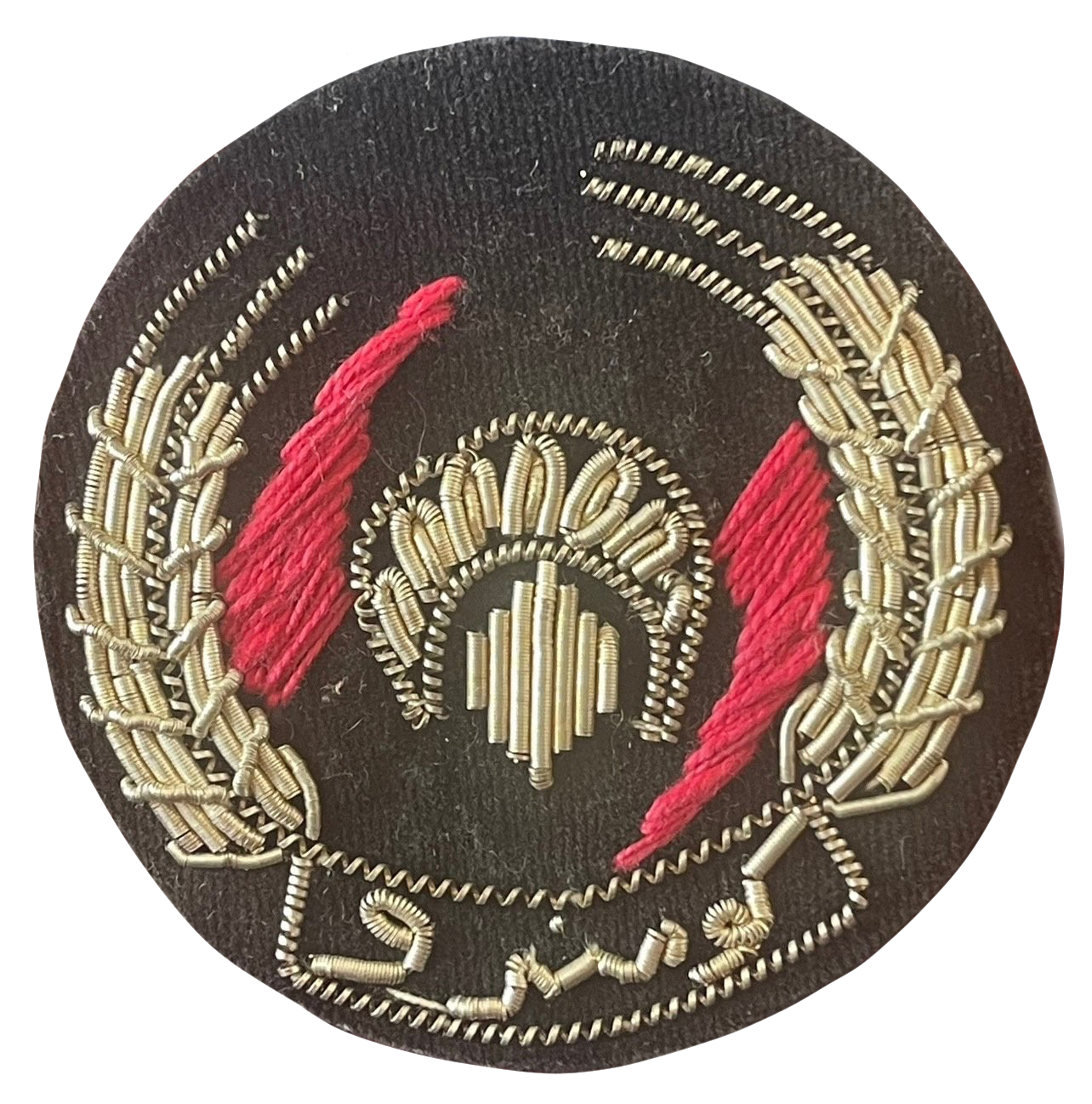
A black patch of the 242nd Parachute Battalion of the Afghan Army

=== Operations under the Kingdom of Afghanistan ===
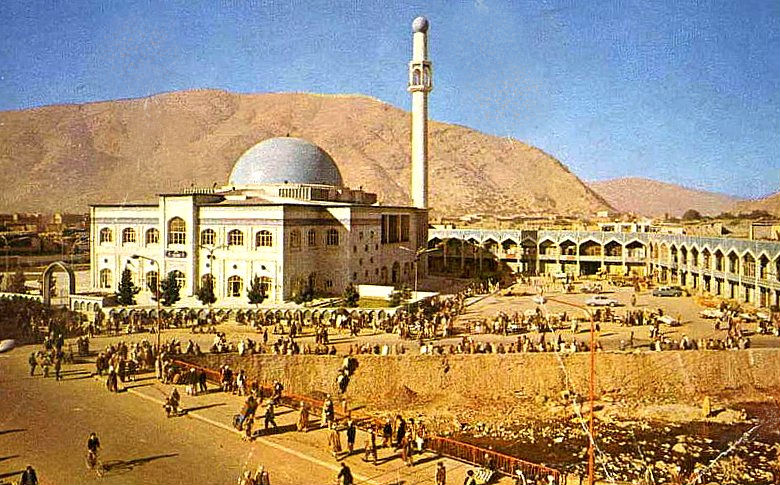
Postcard of Pul-e Khishti Mosque in the 1960s

On 24 May 1970, the first documented commando operation took place, involving the suppression of anti-government protests by the Islamic clergy, led by Herati scholar Muhammad Atta-ullah Faizani. Initially, the Afghan government encouraged the clergy (ulema) to protest against communism, with up to 1500–3000 mullahs from the eastern and southern regions of Afghanistan travelling to Kabul’s Pul-e Khishti Mosque to protest against:

- The activities of the People's Democratic Party of Afghanistan (PDPA) and a publication of newspaper "Parcham" which celebrated the centenary for Vladimir Lenin’s birth
- "Anti-religious" films being shown on television about Prophet Joseph
- Displays of caricatures of Prophet Mohammed and his number of marriages being quoted by foreign press outlets and the Afghan leftist "Esalat" newspaper (which is still in existence)

However, these facilitated protests turned into an anti-government rally, as the Islamic clergy criticized the government for not taking action against the PDPA and other leftist organisations, as well as accusing them of "subjecting Afghanistan to Western influence" and "undermining the Islamic values" of the country.

Sardar Abdul Wali ordered units of the Royal Afghan Army, such as the 717th Civil Disciplinary Regiment (which was responsible for internal discipline and enforcement of military standards within the 1st Central Corps) to remove the protestors by force and use buses to deport them out of Kabul, back to their homes. The 717th arrived at Pul-e Khishti Mosque at 2:00 am, with the 444th Commando Battalion arriving with tanks and armoured vehicles, led by Col. Rahmatullah Safi. The protestors performed a sleep-in outside of the mosque and inside its courtyard as a form of peaceful protest, as soldiers attempted to wake them up and make them leave the area. As a result of the protestors not leaving the mosque, the soldiers carefully used their gunstocks to disperse the crowd, as the mullahs reluctantly moved towards Maiwand Road where the supplementary buses were parked to deport the protestors from the capital. The protestors reluctantly went inside the buses, shouting "Death to Abdul Wali" and "Allahu Akbar".

== 1973–1978 ==
As the 444th Commando Battalion held a strategic position within Kabul, Prime Minister Mohammad Daoud Khan turned his attention towards the unit to enlist their support in the operation that would later be the 1973 Afghan coup d'état. As the chief of operations within the battalion, Faiz Mohammad was chosen by Daoud to lead the coup, as he began garnering support from officers and junior officers for the operation. He then tasked Hidayutallah Aziz, now a Major, to capture the Arg Royal Palace and for Hashem Zadran to secure the area. It was additionally well known among the 455th Commando Battalion that Zadran was against tribalism and ethnocentrism.

Between 1972 and 1973, the 455th Commando Battalion was being formed at Bala Hissar fortress as the Royal Afghan Army’s third elite formation. Before the battalion could come to full strength, Daoud Khan successfully managed to depose Zahir Shah and the Afghan monarchy during the 1973 Afghan coup d'etat in 17 July. Leftist junior officers of the 242nd Parachute Battalion offered their support to Republican elements taking part in the coup, with the 444th Commando Battalion being heavily involved. After the coup, Capt. Hashem Wardak was promoted to the rank of Major and given command of 242nd Para.

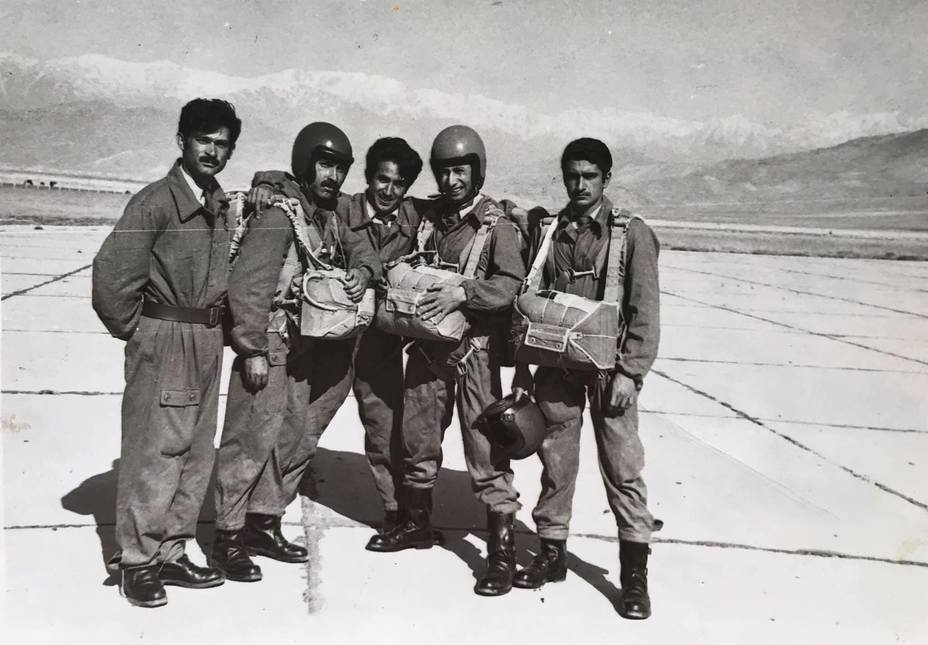
Shahnawaz Tanai and other paratroopers of the 444th Commando Battalion during parachute training, 1973

After briefly being used as palace guards at the Arg Presidential Palace, the 444th Commando Battalion were moved to Jalalabad from Kabul, leaving the 455th Commando Battalion as the only formation in Bala Hissar fortress, under the command of Maj. Hashem Zadran. Between 1975 and 1977, under the presidency of Mohammed Daoud Khan, three more commando formations were established; the 466th Commando Battalion, 2nd Army Corps (Kandahar), the 666th Commando Battalion, 3rd Army Corps (Khost, Nadir Shah Kot) and a supposed 777th Commando Battalion stationed in Gardez, also under the control of the 3rd Army Corps.

=== Uniform specifications ===
In 1974, the Afghan commandos received the Italian M1929 Telo mimetico camouflage, produced locally from fabric printed within Afghanistan. In the mid-1970s, the commandos additionally received a unique orange-green "splinter" camouflage manufactured in Afghanistan.

=== Operations under the Republic of Afghanistan ===
On 17 July 1973, the 444th Commando Battalion would become the main striking force of Republican elements during the 1973 Afghan coup d'état. The operation commenced as the commandos, and other coup participants drawn from Afghan Army units, armed themselves and prepared their weapons. At 1:30am, the commandos began their operation under the orders of Mohammad Daoud Khan, using GAZ-66 vehicles that were exclusively available to them.

Under the leadership of Capt. Faiz Mohammed, the Chief of Operations of the 444th Commando Battalion, the commandos seized Kabul International Airport and the Arg Royal Palace at midnight, disarming the Royal Afghan Guard and taking positions around guard posts, entrances and exits of the palace. The palace was seized by Major Hidayatullah Aziz without a single casualty, or shot fired, for the palace guards or the commando personnel.

The commandos then coordinated the arrests of members of the royal family such as Crown Prince Ahmad Shah and Lt. General Abdul Wali Khan. After the capture of the Arg, Ministry of Foreign Affairs building, the Chief Registrar’s office and this disarmament of the royal gendarme, Faiz Mohammed and his forces proceeded to Daoud Khan’s residence and informed him of the operation’s success. As a result of Faiz leading part of the battalion in support of Daoud, he was promoted to the rank of major and given command of the battalion, purging it of royalist elements. As a further reward, Faiz Mohammed became the Minister of Interior and command of the 444th Commando Battalion was given to Major Hidayatullah Aziz, who coordinated the seizure of the palace.

In 1974, soldiers of the 444th Commando Battalion were sent to the city of Jalalabad due to skirmishes along the Afghan-Pakistani border, also known as the Durand Line. A year later, in 1975, 444th Commando would be sent to Panjshir Valley to quell an uprising started by Ahmad Shah Massoud (then-22 years old) and Gulbuddin Hekmetyar, the two rebels being assisted by the Iranian SAVAK and the Pakistani Inter-Services Intelligence. Although the 1975 Panjshir Valley uprising saw initial success, with a military garrison being taken by the rebels in Rokha District, the 444th Commando Battalion (in assistance with the Afghan Air Force) successfully engaged with the armed militants, ending in a complete victory for the Afghan government. It resulted in Massoud and Hekmetyar fleeing to Pakistan and any form of rebellion in Panjshir being crushed. In the same year, the 444th Commando Battalion were sent to Laghman to quell the 1975 Laghman uprising by armed Islamists, targeting government headquarters. The rebels faced defeat, being arrested upon arrival, as was Jamiat-e Islami commander Mawlawi Habib Rahman.

== 1978–1988 ==
On 27 April 1978, armed forces units loyal to the People's Democratic Party of Afghanistan deposed President Daoud Khan, overthrew the Republican government and established the Democratic Republic of Afghanistan, during the Saur Revolution.

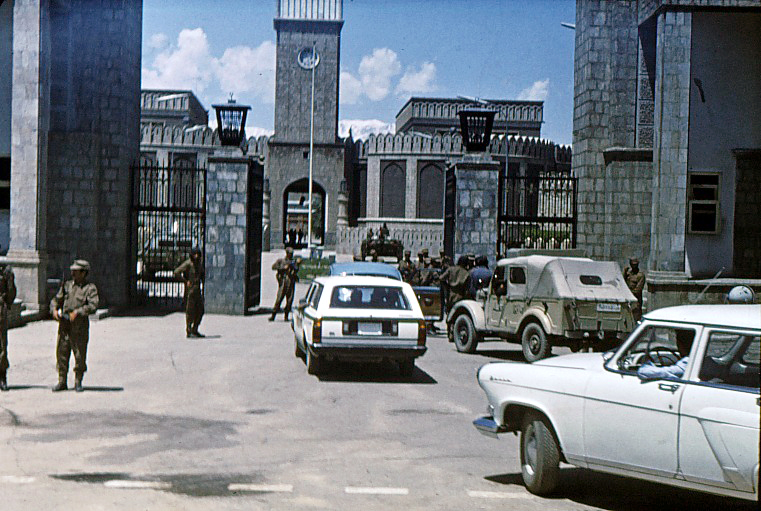
Day after the Saur Revolution in Kabul, 1978

The commando battalions would find themselves becoming the victims of in-fighting, as the 444th, 455th Commando Battalions and the 242nd Parachute Battalion fought among each other. Communists within the 242nd Para neutralised the battalion to ensure soldiers didn't intervene on behalf of President Daoud Khan, meanwhile the Bala Hissar barracks were set on fire by the PDPA-affiliated rebels to distract and immobilise the 455th Commando Battalion.

During the final hours of the coup, Lt. Imauddin, an officer of the 444th Commando Battalion, and Gul Aqa, chief of the Republican Guard Brigade, both ordered Daoud Khan to surrender. Daoud Khan refused and as a result, Imauddin shot him, although Imauddin had been injured by a bullet fired by Daoud. Two commando officers, Babrak Khan and Ibrahim, who took part in the killing of Daoud Khan and his family were interviewed by Soviet media in 1980. It is alleged by the Afghan diaspora that Imauddin now resides in Sacramento, California. Additionally, Lt.Gen Shahnawaz Tanai, would also take part in the coup, being photographed standing outside the gates of the Arg Presidential Palace with a Heckler & Koch MP5. Tanai took command of the 444th Commando Battalion on the early morning of the 28th of April.

Directly after the coup, the 455th Commando and 242nd Para were combined into the 26th Airborne Regiment, stationed at Bala Hissar fortress. A reorganisation and redesignation of the commando formations took place, still retaining their numerical designation. For example, the 444th Commando Battalion was now the 444th Commando Regiment. As a result of the Khalq's disastrous social reforms, land reforms, political purges and their oppression of the Afghan population; the Islamic clergy, regular civilians, Maoists and Parchamites, uprisings began in provinces such as Nuristan and Khost that the commandos would have to deal with, as well as engaging im limited combat against the growing Mujahideen factions.

=== Torture of Hidayatullah Aziz by AGSA ===
Only months after the coup, Hidayatullah Aziz was removed from his position as Head of Operations at the Ministry of Defense and assigned to Harbi Military University as a deputy, despite his role in the Saur Revolution with the 444th Commando Battalion. In July 1978, Hidayatullah was arrested by AGSA and sent to Pul-e-Charkhi prison on charges of plotting against the Khalq-led government, being part of Parcham. AGSA agents subjected him to various forms of torture, including severe beatings, nail pulling and electric shocks. Despite this, he claimed that they could not “force him to betray his ideals”. As a result of Hidayatullah’s defiance, Hafizullah Amin visited the prison himself and ordered the prison guards to place Hidayatullah’s elbow between two chairs and struck with the stock of an AK-47 rifle but Hidayatullah reportedly smiled during the process. Unable to extract information from him through torture, Interior Minister Daoud Taroon shot the commando in the temple with a revolver. After Operation Storm-333 and the installation of a Parchamite government, Hidayatullah Aziz was posthumously awarded the Order of the April Revolution on 6 January 1980.

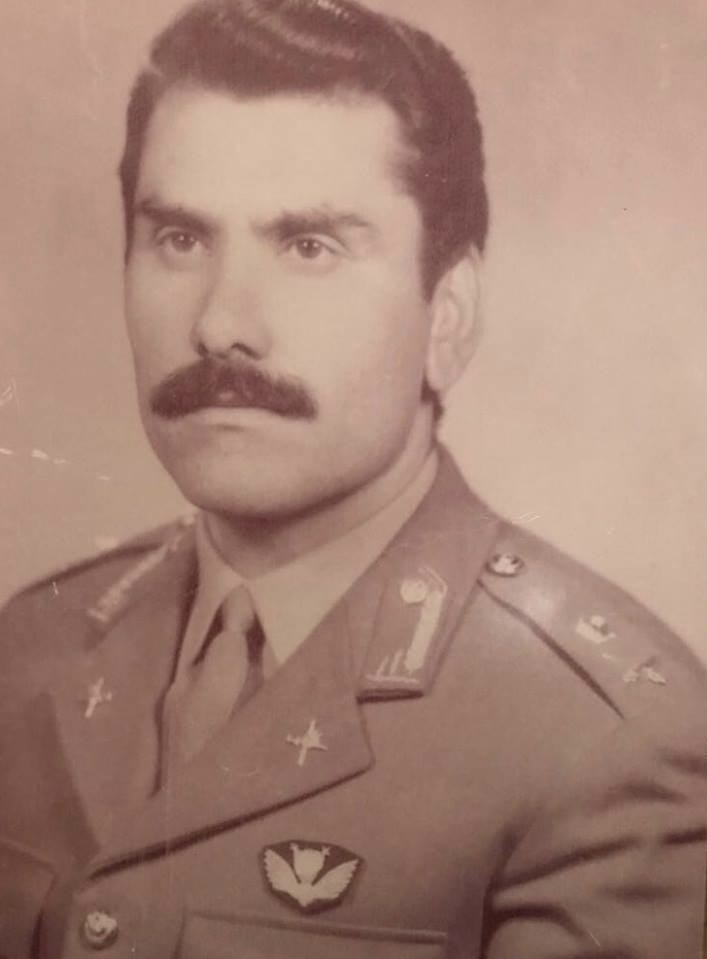
A portrait of Deputy Commander Hidayatullah Aziz, of the 444th Commando Battalion

=== Kerala Massacre ===
On 20 April 1979, the 444th Commando Regiment and the 11th Division of the Afghan Army committed the Kerala massacre, indiscriminately killing 1,000 civilians including women, children, the elderly and the disabled. Major Saddiq Alamyar, the commander of the 444th Commando during the massacre, was arrested by the Karmal administration. He was jailed for a decade before the government collapsed in 1992, when he fled Afghanistan and sought refuge in the Netherlands. He was detained in October 2015, aged 64, although the case against him was ultimately dropped by the Dutch Office of Prosecutors due to a lack of evidence. Alamyar still resides in Rotterdam.

=== Bala Hissar uprising ===
By mid-1979, anti-communist dissent was also starting to emerge within the Afghan Armed Forces, being evident through the defection of the 17th Division during the 1979 Herat uprising. The 26th Airborne Regiment would prove to be politically unreliable as on 15 August 1979, the 26th Airborne and elements of the 444th Commando Regiment joined in the Maoist-led Bala Hissar uprising. The commando mutineers clashed with pro-government forces within the 26th Airborne and 32nd Motorized Infantry Regiments inside the fortress. The mutineers were met with ruthless air bombardment by the Khalq government's MiG aircraft, Mi-24 helicopter gunships (given by the USSR after the 1979 Herat uprising), tanks, AGSA intelligence officers and paramilitary forces under the Ministry of Interior. The battle lasted for five hours, with the revolt being crushed and leaving 400 dead. Tens of Maoist cadres and commando mutineers were arrested and executed in Pul-e Charkhi prison, such as Mohammed Daoud and Mohammed Mohsin. After the uprising, the 444th, 455th and 466th Commando Regiments were converted into battalions once more, with the 444th Commando being moved from Kabul to Surobi and having their commander changed.

On 8 October 1979, Hafizullah Amin had Nur Muhammad Taraki assassinated after being informed of a murder plot which was to be perpetrated by the "Gang of Four" and later assumed power, becoming the new president of the Democratic Republic of Afghanistan. Only days later, on 15 October 1979, the 444th Commando Battalion were ordered to suppress yet another rebellion launched by Afghan Army mutineers of the 7th Division in Rishkhor, located in the southwestern outskirts of Kabul. On 27 December 1979, being alarmed by the implications and consequences of Hafizullah Amin’s tenure, the Soviet Union launched Operation Storm-333 and assaulted Tajbeg Palace, conducted by the KGB, GRU, and the Soviet Airborne Forces. The operation was successful, leading to the assassination of Hafizullah Amin and the installation of Parchamite leader Babrak Karmal. This would be the catalyst and the preliminary for the Soviet–Afghan War.

As part of Baikal-79, a larger operation aimed at taking 20 key strongholds in and around Kabul, the Soviet 105th Airborne Division secured the city and disarmed Afghan Army units without facing opposition. On 1 January 1980, Soviet paratroopers ordered the 26th Airborne Regiment in Bala Hissar to disarm, only for them to refuse and fire upon the Soviets as a firefight ensued. The Soviet paratroopers annihilated most of the regiment, with 700 Afghan paratroopers being killed or captured. In the aftermath of the battle, 26th Airborne Regiment was disbanded and later reorganised into the 37th Commando Brigade, led by Col. Shahnawaz Tanai, being the largest commando formation at a strength of three battalions. As a result of the battle with the 26th Airborne Regiment, the Soviet 357th Guards Airborne Regiment were permanently stationed in Bala Hissar fortress, meaning this new brigade was stationed as Rishkhor Garrison. In the same year, the 81st Artillery Brigade was given airborne training and converted into the 38th Commando Brigade, stationed in Mahtab Qala (lit. Moonlit Fortress) garrison southwest of Kabul under the command of Brig. Tawab Khan. From the memoirs of Khatool Mohammadzai, one of the Afghan Army’s few female paratroopers, Afghan commando recruits had to complete a 150km (93 miles) ruck march from Kabul to Jalalabad, Nangarhar Province in two days. The training was strenuous, resulting in her feet bleeding and having to use rocks as pillows during the march. Mohammadzai additionally claims she was never subject to official discrimination as a female paratrooper.

==== 1979 Herat uprising ====
According to the Afghanistan Justice Project, a commando unit led by Engineer Zarif took part during the 1979 Herat uprising over the course of 5 days. The commando unit is said to have been from Kandahar, possibly being the 466th Commando Battalion.

=== Afghan Separate Spetsnaz Battalions ===
In 1980, there were also plans for three special forces battalions to be created in each of the army's corps, being officially deployed in 1981 as the:

- 203rd Special Purpose Battalion (1st Central Corps, Kabul)
- 212th Special Purpose Battalion (3rd Army Corps, Gardez)
- 230th Special Purpose Battalion (2nd Army Corps, Kandahar)

The three battalions had numerous names, being referred to as "Separate Spetsnaz" and "Special Reconnaissance" in the works of Mark Urban and Ali Ahmad Jalali. They were commonly referred to as "SpN", being an abbreviation for Spetsnaz and standing for "Special Purpose [battalion]" (Russian: Специального назначения, Spetsial'nogo Naznacheniya) as well as reconnaissance battalions. They directly reported to the Intelligence Directorate of the General Staff of the Afghan Armed Forces, also known as KHAD-e-Nezami. The 203rd SpN notably took part in the Marmoul offensives and the Battles of Zhawar, whereas the 212th SpN took part in Operation Magistral. According to Soviet advisors to KhAD-e-Nezami’s Spetsnaz battalions, the Pakistan Armed Forces did not want to capture the SpN operatives alive, testifying to their effectiveness. The Afghan Army’s 11th Division in Jalalabad also had the 211th Separate Spetsnaz Battalion under their command.

Additional formations additionally included the 625th, 626th, 627th, 628th, 629th Operative Battalions, the 477th Commando Battalion in Gardez, the 886th Commando Battalion in Herat and the 665th Commando Battalion in Kandahar International Airport.

In the same year, the 37th Commando Brigade and the 666th Commando Regiment were brought into battle in Kandahar. According to reports from the Soviet 40th Army in 1980, a supposed 344th Commando Battalion of the Afghan Army took part in Operation “Strike" (Russian: удар) with the Soviet 350th Guards Separate Parachute Battalion (sic 350th Guards Airborne or Parachute Landing Regiment) of the 103rd Guards Airborne Division, although no Afghan battalion with such a designation could be found. It is extremely likely the reports were referring to the 38th Commando Brigade.

In September 1982, the commando brigades saw heavy action in Panjshir against the Mujahideen fighters of Jamiat-e Islami. Major Sher Agha, part of the 37th Commando Brigade, additionally took part in the Panjshir offensives before defecting to the National Islamic Front of Afghanistan (NIFA), being the most secular and nationalist faction of the mujahideen. On the same year, the 38th Commando Brigade were involved in a propaganda operation where members of Parcham were taken to the province to bring it back to "normality" after DRA and Soviet forces took the entire Panjshir Valley for the first time since 1978 in Operation Panjshir 2. On 16 June, the brigade additionally welcomed 820 inhabitants who were driven out by the fighting, which was also propagandized. By 1983, the commando brigades were among the most reliable combat units at the disposal of the Afghan Army, seeing constant action but taking heavy casualties. As early as 1980, the province of Khost was held by the mujahideen which led the 38th Commando Brigade to launch an attack, only to take numerous casualties and lose a battalion. Despite Jamiat-e Islami claims to have wiped out the 8th Division and the 38th Commando in 1982, they returned to Panjshir in August, only 6–8 weeks later. In August 1983, the 37th Commando launched a successful air assault operation on Khost, additionally fighting in the province of Paktia. After their successes, they were airlifted into Kabul in October. In April 1984, a Soviet–Afghan task force; including the 37th Commando Brigade, launched Operation Panjshir 7. This task force moved into Panjshir and managed to clear several parts of the valley from Jamiat-e Islami fighters for the first time since 1979. In August, the 38th Commando Brigade were ordered to break a siege in Ali Khel in Paktia, and the 444th Commando Battalion was conducting operations in Kunar Valley. As of May 1984, the 444th Commando Battalion additionally operated in Panjshir under the 2nd Division, alongside two army brigades that were previously part of the 20th and 8th Divisions. In the same year, an Afghan commando featured in the first known Soviet-published photo of an M16 rifle in Afghanistan.

=== 1982 Pul-e Charkhi hunger strikes ===
As a result of inedible food being provided to prisoners in Pul-e-Charkhi prison (often rotten, or mixed with sand and dust) by KhAD and Sarandoy prison guards, the prisoners began a hunger strike. The hunger strike was triggered when inmates gave a pot of hot water to a sick inmate, being subsequently discovered by a prison guard and beaten as punishment. Physical altercations between the guards and the inmates followed soon after, with the enraged inmates driving the guard away from their hall and beginning the hunger strike. By evening, the prisoners had managed to take over the entirety of Cellblock Number Two, joining the strike and locking the iron gates to the hall. The inmates issues a statement demanding that their conditions in the prison be improved to meet international standards, although this was rejected by the authorities and deemed as “illegal.” Soviet advisers were in command, and the Afghan Army had encircled the cellblock, although the inmates continued their hunger strike.

Due to the inmates rejecting demands to discontinue the strike, Afghan commandos were deployed to the prison and took with them specialised equipment to cut through the iron bars on the windows and finally overrun the striking inmates. Afterwards, most prisoners were too weak to carry on the hunger strike, although some still continued despite threats from authorities.

In 1985, a Soviet shift towards small-unit tactics led to an increase in Afghan commando operations. The 444th Commando Battalion conducted a parachute assault in Panjshir Province as part of a search-and-destroy mission. The Mujahideen ambushed the paratroopers, shooting at them as they parachuted from the skies into the landing zone. According to western diplomats citing sources from New Delhi, the operation was a “bloody failure”, with the 444th Commando Battalion suffering an 80% casualty rate while conducting their spring offensives in Panjshir. One diplomat stated that an Afghan source reported 450 Afghan and Soviet bodies being brought to Kabul, with 200 Afghan commandos being either killed or captured after they parachuted into the upper valley of Panjshir. Despite the loss, the 444th Commando Battalion remained one of the more reliable units in the Afghan Armed Forces, being deployed as regular infantry rather than a special warfare unit. According to a declassified 1985 CIA report, most DRA commando battalions were authorized approximately 600 men and usually included three infantry companies, an 82-mm mortar company, RPG-7 anti-tank, air defense (12.7-mm DshK), supply, and signal platoons. The commandos underwent rigorous physical conditioning and received some jump instruction. Some special training for commando forces were also conducted in the Soviet Union, although they only had one airborne battalion, a supposed 242nd Battalion of the 37th Commando Brigade.

In the same year, a Soviet–Afghan task force successfully broke a siege in Barikot, Kunar Valley and closed the Afghan-Pakistani border, although this led to 73 commandos being killed and 30 being captured. Although, not all operations led to success as the 38th Commando Brigade were forced to retreat from Peshgur, Panjshir. The 37th Commando Brigade were sent to reinforce Khost in July, later saving a cut-off Afghan Army garrison and one of the commando brigade’s armored battalions in Kandahar. And on the same year, in 1985, Afghan commandos received Bulgarian camouflage and a distinctive commando cap badge (worn on the beret) which depicted a red thunderbolt over a white parachute behind a sky blue background. During this period, one family portrait suggests the commandos also wore light green berets alongside the cap badge, although only a single image depicts this. The commandos additionally had their own flag, being in a sky blue colour and featuring iconography of a parachute.

=== First and Second Battles of Zhawar ===
In September 1985, the 12th Infantry Division and elements from the 37th and 38th Commando Brigades moved from Gardez to Khost to capture Zhawar, a Mujahideen logistics transfer base in Paktia built using bulldozers and explosives. Rahmatullah Safi, the former commander of the 444th Commando Battalion under the Kingdom of Afghanistan, participated in this battle alongside the Mujahideen. The attack force paired with the 25th Infantry Division, already stationed in Khost, with Shahnawaz Tanai commanding this joint force, being from the neighbouring town of Tani and enjoying popular support in the area. The DRA force launched an attack on Bori, supported by artillery fire and air strikes from the Afghan Air Force. The Mujahideen force in Zhawar were underprepared as most of its major commanders, including Jalaluddin Haqqani, were in Mecca performing the Hajj Islamic pilgrimage.

The joint force managed to successfully capture Bori, advancing into Zhawar. The Mujahideen, however, led a successful counterattack and blocked the ridge on the eastern slope of the Moghulgai mountains. During the fighting, the DRA force lost two APCs and four trucks, withdrawing and returning to Khost to possibly perform reconnaissance. Kochi nomads and Gorbez mujahideen of the Pashtun Safi tribe also recaptured Bori. The DRA task force, along with the two commando brigades, captured the town of Lezhi and managed to kill Commander Mawlawi Ahmad Gul. The Mujahideen in Lezhi retreated south as a 20-man unit blocked the Manay Kandow pass. The DRA forces spent 10 days trying to break through, to no avail, despite the use of air strikes and artillery barrages. The DRA forces then called in air strikes from both the Afghan Air Force and the Soviet Air Forces, leading the mujahideen to retreat on 14 September 1985. The joint force established observation posts and then took control of Tor Kamar, becoming careless as they assumed the mujahideen didn't have any heavy weaponry. Two defected tank commanders then fired upon an artillery spotting observation post, sending soldiers flying, using a T-55. The tankers then fired upon other DRA soldiers, including the 37th and 38th Commando Brigades as they withdrew. After 42 days of fighting, Shahnawaz Tanai broke contact and planned to withdraw his joint attack force at night. The First Battle of Zhawar concluded with a victory for the mujahideen.

A year later, in 1986, the Afghan Ministry of Defense decided to destroy Zhawar. The 7th, 8th, 14th and 25th Infantry Divisions, the 38th Commando Brigade and the 666th "Air Assault" Commando Regiment were committed to the operation and the Second Battle of Zhawar commenced. Gen. Nabi Azimi was the overall commander of the Afghan group of forces, whereas Maj. Gen. Mohammed Asif Delawar was appointed the leader of the Afghan ground forces. Brig. Abdul Gafur, a commando of the 37th Commando Battalion from the Baloch minority, was given control of the operation by Shahnawaz Tanai’s general staff. The 38th Commando Brigade was committed to conduct an air assault on Dawri Gar mountain, rising 3,600 metres above sea level. On 28 February 1986, Afghan government forces moved from Gardez towards Zhawar, being aided by the Soviet Air Force and the Soviet 191th Separate Motorized Rifle Regiment. When the Afghan force moved to Matwarkh, they stopped moving and stayed in the region for a month. The mujahideen used this to their advantage and started shelling them, with the Afghan forces taking casualties but still not moving forward. The 25th Infantry Division moved out of Khost, engaging the mujahideen and later looting three villages and destroying them, later moving to secure Naray Pass so DRA forces could move forward. On 2 April 1986, six Mi-8 helicopters flew from Khost Airfield to insert an assault group from the 38th Commando Brigade, only to meet heavy resistance once they commenced their ground assault. The air assault group commander reported that the firing was far away from his location, as a DRA artillery brigade fired illumination rounds at 3:00am and asked the commandos if they could see the round, to which they replied that it was 10 kilometres away. The commandos then realised that they landed 5 kilometres inside Pakistan, as the air assault group commander quietly told the command post "I understand. We will withdraw".

One hour later, he reported that they were surrounded and locked in combat. Mawlawi Nezamuddin Haqqani saw large groups of helicopters flying in the same direction, escorted by jet fighters, therefore deciding to radio Jalaluddin Haqqani who set out for Zhawar immediately. Mujahideen intelligence agents within the DRA failed to find out that the rest of the 38th Commando Brigade were landed on seven landing zones around Zhawar. Following the air assault, the Soviet Air Forces bombed Mujahideen positions. The Mujahideen then attacked the landing zones of 38th Commando, overrunning four of them and capturing 530 commandos. Colonel Qalander Shah, commander of the 38th Commando Brigade, called artillery fire on his own position and ordered the brigade to retreat, somehow surviving the barrage. A single group of Afghan commandos managed to hold out against the mujahideen for three days before being finally overrun. The chief of counter-reconnaissance in one of the commando brigades managed to lead 24 commandos to safety, which took 8 days. To reinforce the DRA forces, the 11th and 18th Infantry Divisions, 21st Mechanised Infantry Brigade, 203rd Special Purpose Battalion and the 37th Commando Brigade arrived, alongside 5 Soviet battalions. Brig. Abdul Gafur stated he used "hammer and stick" tactics—driving the mujahideen against the mountains to prevent them from retreating and then eliminating them. Both the Soviet and Afghan commandos would launch several of the “hammer and stick” attacks during the second week of April.

Pakistani officers were then sent to Zhawar and attempted to take down Afghan and Soviet aircraft with English blowpipes to no avail, as one Pakistani officer and his NCO were injured as a result of the aerial bombardment. The operation saw the involvement of 100 Pakistani Special Service Group (SSG) operatives and Arab mujahideen volunteers.

On 17 April 1986, a DRA force moved towards Moghulgai mountain, leading to the Mujahideen fleeing without engaging. News soon spread that Jalaluddin Haqqani was wounded by the aerial bombardment, and rumours circulated that Haqqani was killed. As a result, the Mujahideen abandoned Zhawar and on 19 April 1986, DRA and Soviet forces entered the area. General Nabi Azimi then issued orders to arrest the helicopter regiment commander due to the botched landing, with other pilots claiming that he was in hiding and that he explicitly told them to land where they did. The joint DRA-Soviet forces began to destroy the caves of Zhawar, using sappers. They then planted seismic mines and PFM-1 mines in the area before leaving, having only stayed in Zhawar for five hours, and the traps were triggered a day later by the Mujahideen who returned to Zhawar.

The Second Battle of Zhawar was regarded as a DRA-Soviet victory, as Kabul Radio claimed they destroyed 252 independent mujahideen fortifications, neutralised 6000 anti-tank mines and 12,000 anti-personnel mines, and seized hundreds of rockets and rocket launchers, thousands of 107mm rockets and millions of rounds of tank and machine gun ammunition. They also claimed that 2000 mujahideen died and 1000 were injured, although Mark Urban states this number is exaggerated and it's more probable that 1000 mujahideen died. A mujahideen source admits that 250 fighters died in the caves alone. Urban additionally stated the operation "proved the Afghan Army could fight if well-organized and well-supported against heavily armed mujahideen close to their source of supply", although they took 600 casualties. The 37th Commando Brigade managed to enter the caves of Zhawar for the first time in years of the Soviet–Afghan War, taking positions inside. Brigadier Abdul Gafar, the "architect of the victory" was flown back to Kabul and celebrated, having successfully forced the mujahideen to fight on unequal terms and penetrated the cave complex. Only 200–300 men deserted from Gafur's force despite their close proximity to the Pakistani border. The Mujahideen managed to destroy 24 helicopters and two jets, as well as capture 530 personnel from the 38th Commando Brigade. Jalaluddin Haqqani tried and executed Colonel Qalandar Shah alongside 78 other officers who were forced to "confess their crimes" from different operations and then executed. However, regular soldiers were given amnesty as they were conscripts and were ordered to complete two years of labour if they wanted to be fully amnestied. After sustaining heavy casualties, the commando brigades were converted into battalions.

During the celebration of Afghan Independence Day on 19 August 1986, after celebrating the DRA-Soviet victory in the Second Battle of Zhawar a few months prior, Defense Minister Lt.Gen. Nazar Mohammed gave the nickname "hero" to the 37th Commando Battalion for entering the caves of Zhawar, 322nd Fighter Aviation Regiment and the 2nd Border Brigade, awarding them with the "Hero of the Democratic Republic of Afghanistan" medal. Out of the first four Afghans who were awarded this medal, two of them were commandos: Lt.Col Faiz Mohammed (posthumously) and Lt. Juma Khan from the 37th "Hero" Commando Battalion.

Formerly a sergeant, Lt. Juma Khan received his first officer rank for numerous combat distinctions, similar to many other Afghan platoon or company commanders who not only lacked specialist training but also secondary level education. However, the number of officers who managed to complete a brief training course increased and 10–15 graduates of the military university joined the commando forces annually.

=== Afghan “Airborne Assault Commando Troops” ===
The Commando Brigades were, in contrast, considered reliable and were used as mobile strike forces until they sustained excessive casualties. Insurgents ambushed and inflicted heavy casualties on the 37th Commando Brigade during the Second Battle of Zhawar in Paktika Province in April 1986. After sustaining heavy casualties, the commando brigades were turned into battalions. According to French magazine “RAIDS”, each brigade theoretically consisted of 2,000 men organized into three combat battalions of approximately 550 commandos each, with support units. The commandos possessed almost no heavy equipment, only 82mm mortars and 14.5mm machine guns, except in Kabul, where they had BTR-60 and BTR-70 armoured personnel carriers. While officially, commando units enlisted on a volunteer basis, in reality, 90% of the personnel were chosen from the Afghan Army. The leadership consisted of officers who have undergone training in the USSR, both in military academies and at the airborne school in Ryazan.

In the same year, the Afghan Commando Forces underwent another significant reformation as the 444th Commando Battalion was reorganised into a brigade, consisting of six battalions. Since 1983, 444th Commando were stationed in Panjshir, being the only divisional commando formation, part of the 2nd Infantry Division. The remaining commando and special formations, such as the 37th, 38th and 466th Commando Battalions, 666th "Air Assault" Commando Regiment, 203rd, 212th and 230th SpN battalions became part of a new "Afghan Airborne Assault Commando Troops". This new combined formation was to be fully equipped with armaments, for which the Ministry of Interior and State Security (WAD) were obligated to allocate hundreds of their personnel. The 84th and 85th Commando Battalions were additionally formed in 1987 to be part of the airborne assault force, with plans for four separate battalions to also join this new force. Although the airborne assault force was established, plans for the formation of four additional battalions were abandoned. A Soviet–Afghan joint force additionally conducted Operation Magistral in 1987, reinforced by Soviet 40th Army and 103rd Guards Airborne Brigade commanded by Boris Gromov and the DRA Special Purpose Battalion in Gardez, 8th, 11th, 12th, 14th and 25th Infantry Divisions and the 15th Tank Brigade, commanded by Shahnawaz Tanai. On 1 December 1987, an Afghan commando battalion and a Soviet airborne battalion captured the Sata-Kandow Pass which was 30km east of Gardez, leading the Mujahideen to retreat and leave their armaments behind.

Annually, the commandos lost around 10% of their personnel due to the sheer number of combat operations they had to undertake, with two-thirds of this percentage also being deserters or captured commandos. Despite this, they were the most formidable and combat-ready force at the disposal of the Democratic Republic of Afghanistan. In 1988, the 37th Commando Battalion and the three SpN battalions only had a one-week break between combat operations. Nevertheless, recruits for the Afghan Commando Forces still displayed eagerness to join, wanting to receive jump wings and a maroon beret. Afghan commandos were taught the Soviet martial art of ARB and a select few paratroopers of the 37th Commando Brigade were taught how to use Nunchaku by the Soviet Airborne Forces.

== Disbandment ==
In the same year, the “Airborne Assault Commando Troops" were disbanded due to the Soviet withdrawal from Afghanistan and due to a shortage of forces defending cities such as Jalalabad, Khost, Kandahar, Herat and many others. All commando battalions and regiments were placed under the control of the commanders of the three army corps. Despite this, Afghan commandos still wore their jump wings and their commando formation insignia on their right shoulder, which was later carried over to the Islamic Republic of Afghanistan.

In 1988, the Afghan National Guard (‘Gard-e-Mili’, previously referred to as the Afghan Special Guard ‘Gard-e-Khas’ and Guards Corps) was formed, with the 37th and 38th Commando Battalions being assigned to it. However, according to Conboy, both battalions retained their independence and did not become part of the Afghan National Guard, being moved to Bala Hissar fortress. The 37th and 38th Commando were later reconverted into brigades and remained in a reserve capacity, ensuring that they could be rapidly deployed to address any situations and in 1989, during the Battle of Jalalabad, the 37th and 38th Commando Battalions were present during the defence of the city against ISI-supported Mujahideen forces. According to Afghan Army General Syed Siddique, who wrote about his experiences during the battle, the 37th Commando Brigade was re-designated as the 37th Commando Division.

In 1990, Defense Minister Shahnawaz Tanai used a single battalion of the 37th Commando Brigade, with the other two battalions being deployed to Jalalabad during the 1990 Afghan coup attempt. The coup attempt failed, being thwarted by the Afghan National Guard led by Gen. Khushal Peroz, military university students, the Afghan Army’s 10th Division, 717th Civil Disciplinary Regiment, the Sarandoy’s 8th Gendarme Brigade, and WAD’s 1st and 5th Directorates. In 1991, the 666th "Air Assault" Commando Regiment was decimated by the Mujahideen during the Siege of Khost, and in April 1992, the Afghan government collapsed. Information about what happened to other commando and special formations is unavailable, however, they were not listed among the formations under the control of the Mujahideen in the spring of 1992. According to rumours, Shahnawaz Tanai managed to recruit commando officers into the ranks of the Taliban, in which they fought the Mujahideen from 1994 to 1996.

== Parachutist badges ==
=== Parachutist badges of the Afghan commando battalions ===
The Afghan commando forces had four classes of parachutist badges worn on the chest, usually with a red, blue or black felt behind the badge, although it was sometimes worn without any felt. Out of the four classes, three of them have stars which indicate the experience of the paratrooper donning them on their uniform, such as:

- First-class badge (three stars, equivalent to Master Paratrooper)
- Second-class badge (two stars, awarded for several dozen jumps in a combat situation)
- Third-class badge (one star, awarded for jumps in a combat situation)
- Fourth-class badge (no star, given to new paratrooper recruits)

The concept of the paratrooper badges have remained unchanged ever since their inception under the Afghan monarchy, although there have been multiple variants of these badges that are designated by "series" or by "type". There are three series of these parachutist badges, such as:

- Type 1
  - The first design of the Afghan parachutist badge under the Kingdom of Afghanistan, being of very poor quality.
- Type 2
  - The second design of the Afghan parachutist badge, being a smaller size with a light metal construction and a "gold" colour, although there is a silver grey variant. The wings are straight, appearing to be flying upwards sharply.
- Type 3
  - The third design of the Afghan parachutist badge, having rounded and curved wings on each side and being silver.

Former paratroopers could still be seen wearing their parachutist badges under the Islamic Republic of Afghanistan, such as Khatool Mohammadzai, Sher Mohammad Karimi and Abdul Rashid Dostum, who wore two parachutist badges.

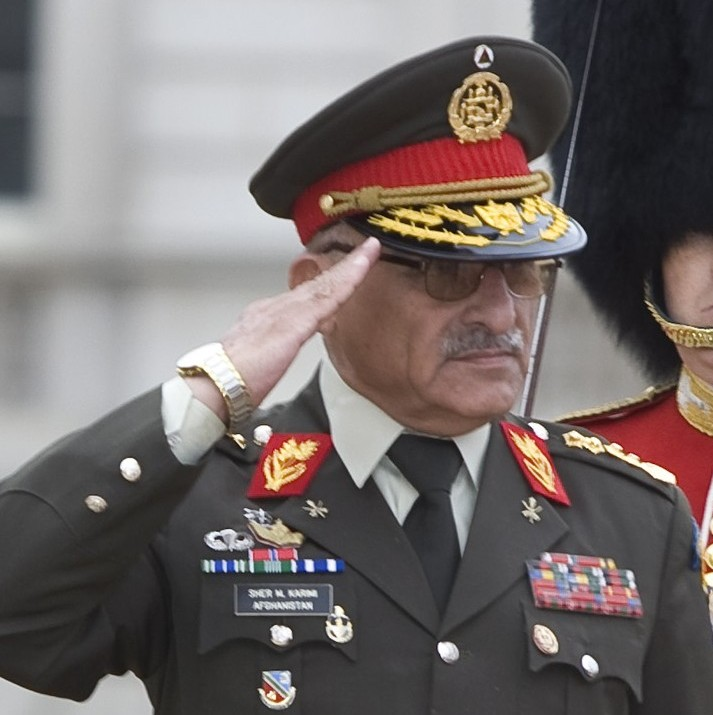
Sher Mohammad Karimi wearing his jump wings during a visit to London, 2011

== Units ==
=== Kingdom of Afghanistan ===
- 242nd Parachute Battalion (Sherpur District, Kabul)
- 444th Commando Battalion (Sherpur District, Kabul)
- 455th Commando Battalion

=== Republic of Afghanistan ===
- 242nd Parachute Battalion (Sherpur District, Kabul)
- 444th Commando Battalion (Sherpur District, Kabul)
- 455th Commando Battalion
- 466th Commando Battalion (2nd Army Corps, Kandahar)
- 666th Commando Battalion (3rd Army Corps, Khost)
- 777th Commando Battalion (Paktia)

=== Democratic Republic of Afghanistan ===
- 26th Airborne Regiment (Bala-e-Hissar fort) (1978–1979)
- 37th "Hero" Commando Brigade (Kabul, Panjshir in 1983)
  - 625th Operative Battalion
  - 626th Operative Battalion
- 38th Commando Brigade (Parwan)
  - 627th Operative Battalion
  - 628th Operative Battalion
  - 629th Operative Battalion
- 84th Commando Battalion (formed in 1987)
- 85th Commando Battalion (formed in 1987)
- 200th Reconnaissance Battalion
- 201st Commando Battalion
- 344th Commando Battalion (in 1980)
- 444th Commando Brigade (regiment in 1978, brigade in 1988) (stationed in Panjshir in 1983)
- 466th Commando Battalion (regiment in 1978) (Kandahar) (non-divisional)
- 477th Commando Battalion (regiment in 1978) (in existence according to the CIA)
- 665th Commando Battalion (Kandahar International Airport)
- 666th "Air Assault" Commando Regiment (Paktia, 1986)
- 866th Commando Battalion (Herat)
