= 203rd Separate Spetsnaz Battalion =

- کندک ۲۰۳ اسپتسناز جداگانه
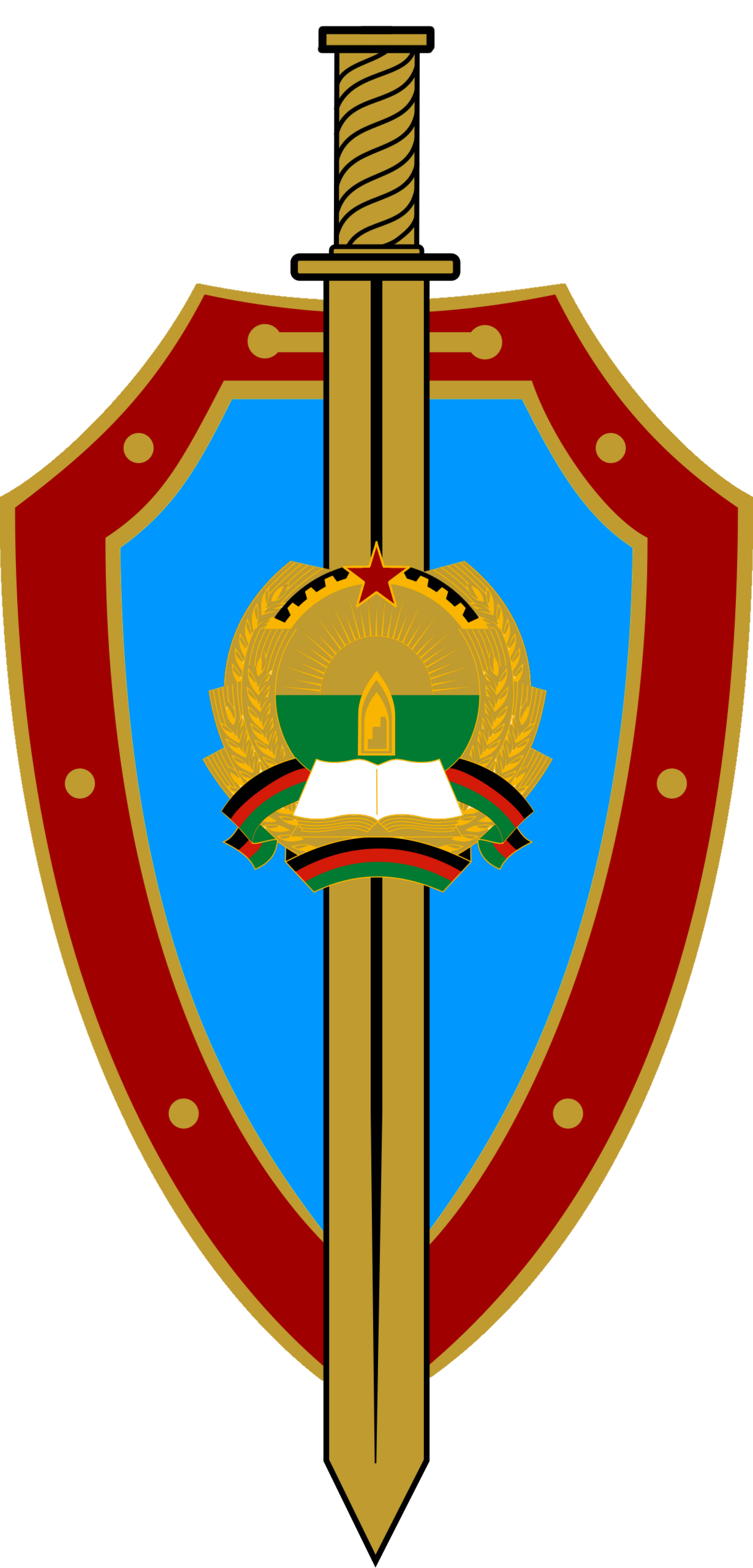
- The emblem for KhAD-e Nezami
- Active: 1981–1992
- Disbanded: 1992
- Country: Afghanistan
- Branch: KhAD-e Nezami
- Type: Spetsnaz
- Role: Special operations Counterinsurgency
- Size: Classified
- Part of: Afghan Army; 1st Central Army Corps; KhAD-e Nezami
- Garrison/HQ: Kabul
- Nicknames: Special Recon, SpN
- Engagements: Soviet-Afghan War; Marmoul offensives; Battles of Zhawar; Second Battle of Zhawar

Commanders
- Notable commanders: Mohammad Najibullah; Ghulam Faruq Yaqubi

The 203rd Separate Spetsnaz Battalion, also referred to as the 203rd SpN (Special Purpose Battalion) or 203rd Special Reconnaissance Battalion, (Dari: کندک ۲۰۳ اسپتسناز جداگانه) was one of four Afghan spetsnaz battalions unit subordinated to KhAD-e-Nezami (military intelligence) of the Khadamat-e Aetla'at-e Dawlati (KhAD), Afghan Army's military intelligence wing.

According to Soviet advisors to KHAD's Spetsnaz battalions, the Pakistani Special Service Group (SSG) did not want to capture SpN operators alive, testifying to their effectiveness.

== History ==
In 1980, under President Babrak Karmal and the Parcham faction of the People's Democratic Party of Afghanistan, the Ministry of Defense drafted plans to form three Spetsnaz battalions for each of the Afghan Army corps. A year later, in 1981, the 203rd Separate Spetsnaz Battalion was formed (alongside the 212th, 230th and 211th) under the 1st Central Army Corps in Kabul and subordinated to KhAD-e-Nezami of the Khadamat-e Aetla'at-e Dawlati (KhAD).

The 203rd SpN reportedly worked alongside the Spetsnaz GRU and the Soviet Border Troops, as well as with the Soviet Airborne Forces (VDV).

== Missions ==
The unit's missions primarily involve anti-irregular military in desert and urban terrains areas, capture or kill high-value targets, counterinsurgency in difficult-to-access terrains, direct action (short-duration strikes or small-scale offensive actions) on key military targets, executive protection (especially high-ranking officials of Khadamat-e Aetla'at-e Dawlati) within areas of responsibility, infiltrating by land or air for special reconnaissance to military intelligence gathering in the border areas between Afghanistan and Pakistan, irregular warfare, maneuver warfare, providing security in areas at risk of sabotage within areas of responsibility, and special operations for special activities military intelligence operations.
