= Second Battle of Zhawar =

Soviet–Afghan War battle

- Part of the Soviet–Afghan War
| Date | February 28 – April 19, 1986 |
| Location | Zhawar, Khost Province, Afghanistan (spillover into Pakistan, Miramshah) |
| Result | DRA-Soviet government victory: 37th Commando Brigade promptly withdraw after seizing Zhawar Base and dispersing bombs and mines; Jalaluddin Haqqani wounded; Failure to block Miranshah road; Captured DRA officers executed; Siege of Khost continues |

Belligerents
| Afghanistan; Soviet Union | Afghan mujahideen Pakistan |

Commanders and leaders
| (Afghanistan) Nabi Azimi (replaced) (Afghanistan) Qalander Shah (executed) (Soviet Union) Valentin Varennikov | Jalaluddin Haqqani (WIA) |

Units involved
| KhAD-e-Nezami; 203rd Special Purpose Battalion; Afghan Armed Forces; (Afghanistan) Afghan Army; 7th Infantry Division; 8th Infantry Division; 11th Infantry Division; 18th Infantry Division; 24th Infantry Division; 25th Infantry Division; 21st Mechanised Infantry Brigade; 2nd Border Brigade; 22nd Guards Regiment; Afghan Commando Forces; 37th Commando Brigade; 38th Commando Brigade (surrendered); 466th Commando Battalion; 666th Commando Battalion; (Afghanistan) Afghan Air Force; 322nd Fighter Aviation Regiment | Haqqani Network; Kochi nomad volunteers; Gorbez mujahideen; Arab Volunteers |

Strength
| 12,000 | 700–800 mujahideen |

Casualties and losses
| Significant Casualties; Unknown killed and injured (Afghanistan) 530 captured (78 executed) (Afghanistan) 24 helicopters destroyed | 281 killed 363 wounded |

The Second Battle of Zhawar was a significant engagement that took place during the Soviet-Afghan War. It pitted Afghan Army units, supported by the Soviet Union, against mujahideen faction led by Jalaluddin Haqqani. The objective of the battle was to destroy the mujahideen's logistical base located in Zhawar, just three kilometers from the Durand Line.

The initial offensive, known as the first battle of Zhawar, and was launched in September 1985. DRA divisions, with air support from the Soviet Union, initiated the attack while major mujahideen commanders were absent, including Haqqani who was on pilgrimage to Mecca. The DRA forces advanced from Khost and successfully captured the village of Bori, northeast of Zhawar. However, they encountered fierce resistance and were forced to retreat.

The main attack began on September 4 and initially achieved success, with the capture of the village of Lezhi and the killing of a mujahideen commander. However, the offensive was halted at the heavily fortified Manay Kandow pass, where the mujahideen put up a strong defense. After ten days of relentless resistance, the mujahideen were compelled to withdraw due to heavy airstrikes by Soviet aircraft. This allowed the DRA forces to cross the pass and capture the strategic Tor Kamar position, enabling them to shell the mujahideen base with artillery.

During a subsequent counter-attack led by the mujahideen, the DRA forces were caught off guard by the presence of two T-55 tanks. Sustaining heavy losses, the DRA troops fell back and attempted to renew the assault but were met with reinforcements from Pakistan. The mujahideen successfully repelled further attacks, leading to the eventual withdrawal of the DRA units after 42 days of intense fighting. This victory significantly bolstered the morale of the mujahideen forces.

== Zhawar ==
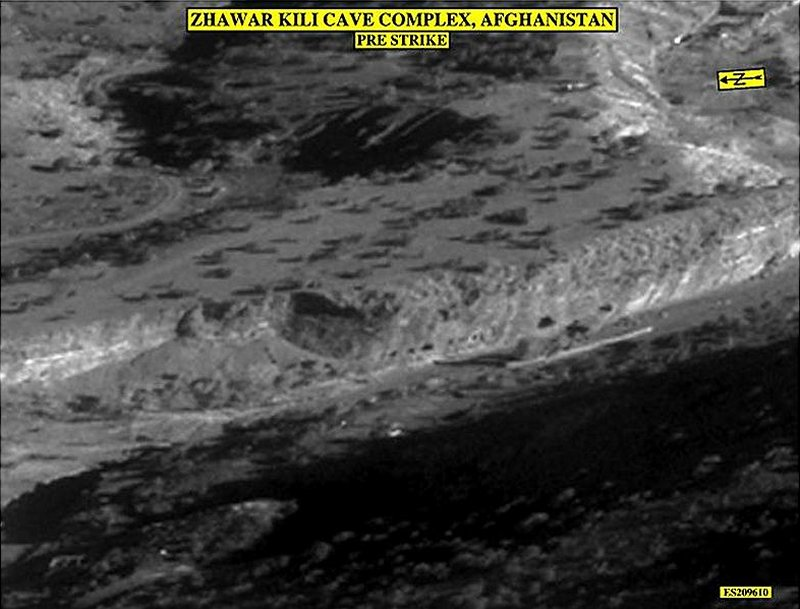
The Zhawar caves in 2002.

The Mujahideen base at Zhawar, situated in Paktia Province, (Note: In 1985, the area became part of the newly established Khost Province.) served as a storage facility for supplies and equipment being transferred from neighbouring Pakistan to the various guerrilla groups operating in the region. It also served as a training and command facility. The Mujahideen had dug tunnels up to 500 m into the Sodyaki Ghar mountain, with accommodations including a hotel, a mosque, a medical point and a garage to house the two T-55 tanks that had been captured from the DRA in 1983.

The Mujahedeen defending the base numbered 500, and they were armed with a D-30 howitzer, several BM-21 multiple rocket launchers and five ZPU-1 and ZPU-2 heavy machine-guns for air defence. Additionally, other Mujahideen groups were active in the area, and they participated in the defense of the base when necessary. These groups were part of various movements including the Hezbi Islami, the Hezb-e Islami Khalis, the Harakat-i-Inqilab-i-Islami and the Mahaz-e-Melli, though all in theory came under the authority of regional commander Jalaluddin Haqqani.

== The Battle ==
The second offensive was conducted on a larger scale, and eventually involved 12,000 troops, including 2,200 Soviets, led by DRA General Nabi Azimi, with Soviet General V. G. Trofimenko serving as advisor.

The offensive began on 28 February 1986, a short while after General Secretary Mikhail Gorbachev had announced the decision to withdraw Soviet troops from Afghanistan. Thus the Soviet units were initially confined to supporting the Afghan offensive.

The opening moves were conducted by DRA ground troops attacking from Khost and Gardez who made very slow progress, due to bad weather and harassment by the Mujahideen, reaching the approaches to Zhawar only one month later.

The second phase of the offensive was to be an airborne assault carried out by the Afghan 38th Commando Brigade. The initial assault group, transported by Mi-8 helicopters, departed on 2 April, but they got lost in the darkness and accidentally landed on the wrong side of the Pakistani border. This force was quickly surrounded and taken prisoner. The main airborne assault came in the immediate vicinity of Zhawar, and was supported by precision airstrikes by Soviet Su-25 attack aircraft. These attacks caused some losses among the Mujahideen defenders, even trapping 150 of them, including Haqqani, inside a cave that had been targeted by a missile. Haqqani later escaped and led 700-800 Mujahideen in a series of counter-attacks against the DRA landing zones, that they overran one by one. After three days of fighting, the DRA 38th Brigade had ceased to exist as a fighting force, and 530 commandos had been captured by the Mujahideen. The DRA also lost 24 helicopters. This fiasco prompted the Soviets to take over the operation, whose command was given to General Valentin Varennikov. The DRA force was strengthened with Soviet units, and the aerial bombardment of Mujahideen positions was intensified and pursued round the clock.

Eventually, on April 17, the offensive was renewed. After several unsuccessful attempts, the DRA/Soviet force managed to capture the strategic Dawri Gar mountain. At a crucial moment, a Hezbi Islami unit drew back from their positions without fighting. At the same time, Jalaluddin Haqqani was injured in an airstrike, causing rumours of his death to spread rapidly among the Mujahideen, and their forces abandoned the defense of Zhawar, that was overrun by government forces.

The Soviet engineers tasked with destroying the base had very little time to do so, as the Afghan troops were intent on withdrawing as soon as possible, fearing a Mujahideen counter-attack. In the end they tried to do as much damage as they could by detonating explosives inside the caves, and laying seismic mines before withdrawing hurriedly.

== Aftermath and losses ==
The Soviet and DRA losses remain uncertain, but were presumably heavy. The Mujahideen claimed to have destroyed 24 helicopters and 2 jets, and captured 530 prisoners, for a loss of 281 killed and 363 injured. Of the 500 Afghan prisoners, 78 officers were tried and executed by Haqqani and Khalis, including the commander of the 38th commando brigade, Colonel Qalandar Shah.

The Afghan government celebrated their victory, and though the success had proved costly, it served to alleviate the pressure on Khost, that was then under siege. However, Zhawar was quickly retaken by the Mujahideen, who repaired the damage, and strengthened their defenses.

== See also ==
- Battles of Zhawar
- First Battle of Zhawar
- Soviet-Afghan War
- Spillover of Soviet - Afghan war in Pakistan
- Afghan Civil War (1989-1992)
- Haqqani Network

== Sources ==
- Grau, Lester & Jalali, Ali Ahmad (September 2001). "The campaign for the caves: the battles for Zhawar in the Soviet-Afghan War". The Journal of Slavic Military Studies. 14 (3): 69–92. doi:10.1080/13518040108430488. S2CID 144936749.
- Westermann, Edward. "The Limits of Soviet Airpower: The Failure of Military Coercion in Afghanistan, 1979-89". University of New Brunswick Libraries.
- Youssaf, Mohammad and Adkin Mark(1992), The Bear Trap: Afghanistan's Untold Story; Leo Cooper
- Johnson, Robert (2011). The Afghan Way of War How and Why They Fight (Hardcover). Oxford University Press, USA. ISBN 9780199798568.
- Riedel, Bruce (2014). What We Won America's Secret War in Afghanistan, 1979?89 (ebook). Brookings Institution Press. ISBN 9780815725855.
- Urban, Mark (2016-07-27). War in Afghanistan (ebook). Palgrave Macmillan UK. ISBN 9781349207619.
- Brown, Vahid (2013). Fountainhead of Jihad The Haqqani Nexus, 1973-2012 (Hardcover). Oxford University Press. ISBN 9780199327980.
