= First Battle of Zhawar =

Soviet–Afghan War battle

- Part of the Soviet–Afghan War
Date	September–October 1985
Location	Zhawar, Paktia Province, Afghanistan
Result	Mujahideen victory

Belligerents
Afghanistan; Soviet Union	Afghan Mujahideen; Pakistan

Commanders and leaders
(Afghanistan) Shahnawaz Tanai, (Afghanistan) Qalandar Shah	Jalaluddin Haqqani; Yunis Khalis; Fathullah Haqqani †

Units involved
(Afghanistan) 12th Infantry Division (Afghanistan) 25th Infantry Division	“Zhawar Regiment”

Strength
	500 mujahideen 2 T-55 tanks

Casualties and losses
Unknown, presumably heavy (mainly DRA)	106 killed 321 injured

The First Battle of Zhawar was fought during the Soviet–Afghan War between Afghan Army units, and their allies the Soviet Union, against mujahideen groups of Haqqani and Khalis. Their objective was to destroy the Mujahideen logistic base situated at Zhawar, 3 kilometers from the Durand line.

== Zhawar ==
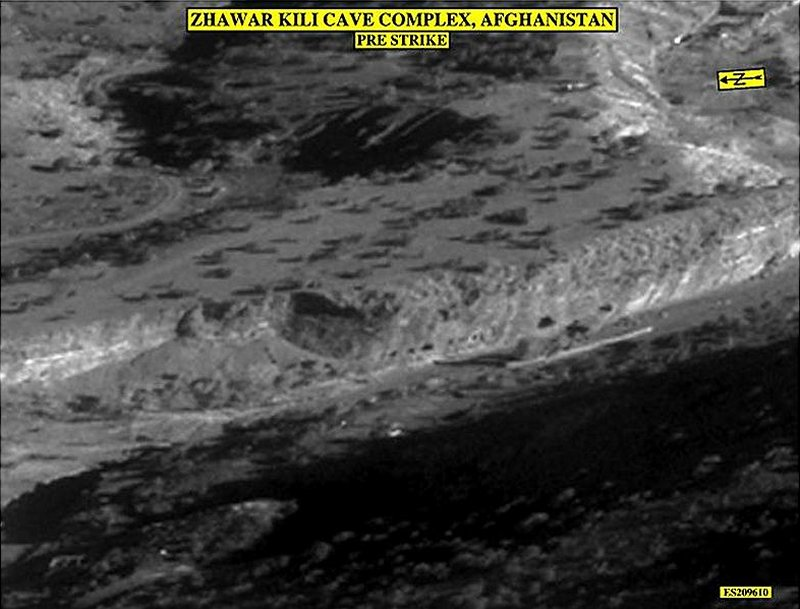
The Zhawar caves in 2002.

The Mujahideen base at Zhawar, situated in Paktia Province, (Note: In 1985, the area became part of the newly established Khost Province.) served as a storage facility for supplies and equipment being transferred from neighbouring Pakistan to the various guerrilla groups operating in the region. It also served as a training and command facility. The Mujahideen had dug tunnels up to 500 m into the Sodyaki Ghar mountain, with accommodations including a hotel, a mosque, a medical point and a garage to house the two T-55 tanks that had been captured from the DRA in 1983.

The Mujahedeen defending the base numbered 500, and they were armed with a D-30 howitzer, several BM-21 multiple rocket launchers and five ZPU-1 and ZPU-2 heavy machine-guns for air defence. Additionally, other Mujahideen groups were active in the area, and they participated in the defense of the base when necessary. These groups were part of various movements including the Hezbi Islami, the Hezb-e Islami Khalis, the Harakat-i-Inqilab-i-Islami and the Mahaz-e-Melli, though all in theory came under the authority of regional commander Jalaluddin Haqqani.

== The Battle ==
The first offensive was launched in September 1985 by elements of the 12th and 25th DRA divisions, supported by Soviet airpower, at a time when the major Mujahideen commanders were absent, including Haqqani, who was performing the Hajj, the pilgrimage to Mecca.

The DRA forces first attacked from Khost, and succeeded in capturing the village of Bori, to the northeast of Zhawar. They then ran into heavy resistance and had to pull back.

The main attack came on September 4, and was at first successful, capturing the village of Lezhi and killing a Mujahideen commander. Very soon the attack was halted at the Manay Kandow pass, that had been heavily fortified by the Mujahideen. For 10 days the defenders held out, but were finally forced to withdraw, under heavy airstrikes by Soviet aircraft. This enabled the DRA forces to cross the pass and capture the Tor Kamar position, overlooking Zhawar, from where they could direct artillery fire at the Mujahideen base.

At this point the Mujahideen launched a counter-attack, led by their two T-55 tanks. The DRA were caught by surprise, as they had not expected to meet armour, and they fell back after sustaining heavy losses. The DRA commander tried to renew the assault, but by that time the Mujahideen had received reinforcements from Pakistan, and they were able to repel further attacks.

Finally after 42 days of fighting, the DRA units withdrew to their bases. This victory considerably boosted the morale of the Mujahideen.

== See also ==
- Second Battle of Zhawar
- Soviet-Afghan War
- Afghan Civil War (1989-1992)
- Haqqani Network
