= Kerala massacre =

Alleged shooting incident in Afghanistan

- Kerala, Kunar (Afghanistan)
- Location: Kerala, Kunar Province, Afghanistan
- Date: April 20, 1979; 47 years ago
- Deaths: 1,170–1,260
- Perpetrators: Afghan Army (Khalq): 444th Commando Battalion led by Sadiq Alamyar; One unit of the 11th Infantry Division led by Bahramuddin and Gul Rang

The Kilara massacre was an alleged incident on 20 April 1979 described in American publication The Christian Science Monitor based on reports from Afghans in Pakistani refugee camps. According to these claims, the then Marxist government of Afghanistan's soldiers and policemen (including the 444th Commando Battalion and the 11th Division of the Afghan Army) drove to a village called Kilara in Kunar Province, eastern Afghanistan, shooting at over one thousand unarmed civilians. The Associated Press had reports of 640 males allegedly put to death in April 1979. These allegations were refuted by the Russian media at the time.

== Background ==
Kerala was a farming community of 5,000, around 12 miles from the Pakistan border. Much of Kunar Province had seen fighting between the Armed Forces of the Democratic Republic of Afghanistan and rebels hiding near the mountains since the Saur Revolution in 1978. On April 19, the day before the incident, local rebels attacked an army garrison in the nearby town of Chaga Serai. Rebels from Kerala had been harassing provincial capital Assadabad for several weeks, to the extent that a United Nations hydro-electric project in the vicinity had to be abandoned. At around the same time, there was the 1979 Herat uprising in March 1979 and the declaration of "holy war" by rebel leaders based in Pakistan.

About 200 armed government troops and police, arrived in tanks in the village on Friday, April 20. It was alleged that the officers aimed their Kalashnikovs at the men and told them to shout pro-communist slogans. Instead, the men shouted Allahu akbar. The officers then allegedly ordered them to crouch down facing the tanks, and soon after started shooting at them. There were claims that having killed the victims, bulldozers arrived thereafter and buried the bodies in a mass grave. Some of the villagers who were buried were not killed, but wounded, suggesting that they were buried alive. Perpetrators of the massacre include Major Sadiq Alamyar, commander of the 444th Commando Battalion, Major Bahramuddin and Major Gul Rang, two officers of the 11th Division. Bahramuddin was killed in a mutiny in Jalalabad, whereas Gul Rang lived in Kabul and Peshawar before dying in 2004. It has been suggested that this was a local initiative taken by government forces based in Kunar. According to one witness, "There was a rumor that Russians were coming to take the women away in buses...But there were no Russians."

Among the dead in the fighting were Wazir Mohammad, a local PDPA official who was the principal of the girls' school at nearby Chigha Sarai, and Mohammad Yashteen, also a staunch PDPA party member, who taught at the local primary school.

The allegations were refuted by Russian media. In particular, the Russian press agency TASS denounced reports published by a number of American publications about the allegations, particularly Newsweek and the Christian Science Monitor. Nikolai Repin, a TASS commentator, charged that the western news media had shattered all records in anti-Soviet propaganda in spreading what he called "the monstrous misinformation" about a massacre. Repin continued:

The authors of this falsehood are not in the least embarrassed by the fact that no Soviet officer had actually been in the village of Kerala or even in all of Kunar Province, where the village is situated.... The whole story of a "mass execution" also does not correspond to reality; it is pure invention from start to finish....The fabrications are so vile that they would not even be worth answering had not this deliberate slander against millions of people been spread all over the world.... The falsehood that was fabricated with their participation is a component part of the malicious campaign that is being waged against the USSR and Afghanistan by imperialist propaganda.

In October 2015, Sadeq Alamyar was arrested by Dutch National Police Corps in the Netherlands on suspicion of war crimes, based on a criminal complaint filed in 2008. Alamyar, who was commander of the elite Afghan Army 444th Commando Battalion at the time, was accused of ordering the killings and for having shot the victims himself. A Khalqist, Alamyar was jailed in the 1980s during the rival Parchamite faction rule of Babrak Karmal before he fled to the Netherlands for asylum. In December 2017 the case against him was dropped because of lack of evidence.

== Aftermath ==
According to the AIHRC (Afghan Independent Human Rights Commission), Western accounts inaccurately put down the village's name as ‘Kerala’ (not to be confused with the Indian state of the same name) with the actual name being Kilara, or Kidari in the local dialect.

== See also ==
- List of massacres in Afghanistan
