= Marmoul offensives =

Marmoul offensive
- Part of Soviet–Afghan war
Date	1984
Location	Afghanistan
Result	Soviet-DRA victory

Belligerents
Afghanistan; Soviet Union	Afghan Mujahideen; Jamiat-e Islami; Pakistan

Commanders and leaders
(Soviet Union) Yuri Andropov; (Soviet Union) Mshl. Sergei Sokolov; (Soviet Union) Maj. Gen. G.A. Zgersky; (Soviet Union) Maj. Gen. S.N. Shevchenko.	Ahmad Shah Massoud; Mohammad Zabihullah †

Units involved
Soviet Union: (no border) Soviet Army; KGB; (Afghanistan) DRA: Afghan Army; KHAD; Afghan Commando Forces	Unknown

Casualties and losses
Unknown	500 Mujahideen killed; Weapons, ammunition, and other military assets of the enemy were partially destroyed and captured.

The Marmoul offensives were a series of military operations conducted by Soviet troops, KGB Border Guards of the USSR and DRA government forces, more specifically the 203rd Special Purpose Battalion, against Afghan mujahideen in the provinces of Balkh and Samangan in northern Afghanistan during the Soviet–Afghan War.

The Marmoul offensives included operations to seize fortified areas, fortification complexes and logistical bases (Alburs, Agarsai, Bayramshah, Shorcha), and to destroy the infrastructure of rebel bases. Other objectives included blocking the supply channels for weapons and ammunition and neutralizing members of the armed formations of the Mujahideen. They consisted in a series of joint or independent, ground and air combat operations on a broad front with the involvement of considerable forces and means.

== Military-political situation in the region ==
The situation on the Soviet-Afghan border has significantly worsened. Cases of violation of the state border, provocation against border units and local population of the Soviet Central Asian republics living on the border with Afghanistan, attacks on transport columns carrying cargo, from the USSR into the DRA, had increased significantly.

The predominant part of the local population was on the side of a large group of insurgents operating in the region, almost in every village there were members of local opposition groups and foreign militant groups. A quarter of the total number of members of armed groups in Afghanistan, reaching in 1982 up to 45 thousand, and by 1987 up to 82,3 thousand, were active in the northern regions of the country.

By the end of 1981, as a result of operations in northern Afghanistan, the plans of the Mujahideen to seize the territory of one of the northern provinces and to establish an anti-government regime were foiled. The threat of seizure by opposition groups of a number of areas adjacent to the Afghan-Soviet border was prevented.

However, by 1982 the situation was significantly complicated. The outbreak of armed protests against the Kabul Government became more widespread. More than 40% of the districts of the northern provinces of the DRA were under the control of the armed opposition. The activities of the provincial and local administrative centers were paralyzed, and the main axes of communication by road were blocked.

== Field Commander Mohammad Zabiullah ==
Mohammad Zabiullah (real name Abdul Kader, nom de guerre Mohammad Zabiullah) was the Mujahideen commander from 1980 until 1984 in the Marmoul area. At the initial stage of the war he was a field commander under Ahmad Shah Massoud in the Panjshir valley. In 1980 Massoud sent him to Balkh province to organize the armed struggle in the region. Before the war, he was a religious teacher in Mazar-i-Sharif.

According to the description of a western journalist in 1982, Zabiullah was short, round-faced with a thick beard - a charismatic young man, more than twenty years old, possessing the qualities of a leader and organizer, and was distinguished by restraint.

At the initial stage of the guerrilla struggle, Zabiullah personally led the actions of his detachments in the attack on Soviet troops and government forces in the province of Balkh and in the vicinity of the city of Mazar-i-Sharif. By 1983, most of the fighting in the province of Balkh was conducted under his direct leadership.

An excellent organizer, he divided the region into 73 controlled military districts, each of them had a commander leading one or several partisan groups. Most of these groups were intentionally small, with 10, 20 and not more than 30 fighters. All of them were under the general command of Zabiullah.

Like Massoud in Panjshir, Zabiullah did not neglect civil initiatives. He created schools and classes in literacy, Islamic studies, and the foundations of guerrilla warfare. The government of Kabul unsuccessfully tried to bribe Zabiullah, he was twice approached with a proposal to pay money or grant status, in exchange for guarantees that his partisan detachments would not attack the Soviet and Afghan government columns in the Marmoul gorge.

Zabiullah was killed in the Balkh province on December 14, 1984, when the vehicle in which he was traveling was blown up by a land mine allegedly laid by a rival partisan detachment.

== The history of the Marmoul offensives ==
In accordance with Soviet military custom, the operation was named after its principal geographic objective.

During the Afghan War (1979-1989) in the northern Balkh province, the districts of the Marmoul, Tangimarmoul, Shadian, and Tashkurgan canyons, a series of different in scale, goals, tasks, forces and means - combined arms operations of units of the 201st Motorized Infantry Division 40th Army, units of the Border Guards of the KSAPO of the KGB of the USSR, special forces of the GRU of the USSR Ministry of Defense, with the participation of parts of the government forces of the DRA armed forces were undertaken against the armed formations of Afghan mujahideen of the Islamic Society of Afghanistan of Burhanuddin Rabbani, operating under the leadership of Ahmad Shah Massoud whose field commanders were Mohammad Zabiullah (killed in a mine explosion on December 14, 1986) and Atta Muhammad Nur.

== Marmoul gorge and base area ==
The region of Marmoul, a highland in the west of the Hindu Kush mountain system, is located on a pedestal raised above 1000 meters, combining mountain ranges and massifs alternating with wide flat hollows, intermontane depressions, plateaus and valleys. The height of the crest above the foot of the mountain range varies from 1400 to 2200 meters in different places.

The Marmoul gorge is located in a mountain range 17 kilometers south of the city of Mazar-i-Sharif. Stretching for 400 kilometers from west to east (200 kilometers), and further to the south (200 kilometers), it forms a deep canyon, orange-brown in colour, with sheer rockfaces on either side. In the western and central parts of the Marmoul gorge, the Shadian and Tangimarmoul gorges proceed from it perpendicularly to the south, reaching, at the final stage, the valleys and villages of Shadian and Marmoul, respectively. In the eastern sector, the Marmoul gorge itself bends strictly southward, and expanding within the canyon boundaries, already extends in the province of Samangan towards the district town of Aibak.

Throughout the length of the Marmoul gorge the height of the opposite slopes and the width of the winding canyon vary considerably. At the western entrance to the gorge through a neck cut in the rocks, the narrowest point does not exceed 3.6 meters. Because of the characteristic orange-brown color of the rock, it was known among Soviet servicemen as the gorge of «red rocks».

Marmoul, a remote mountainous region well equipped according to the laws of engineering thought and military science, was a fortified complex with a multi-level echeloned fire control system. It was designed to act in a sustainable defense and to allow a small isolated force to inflict maximum damage on a much superior attacking force. The permanent firing points of the Marmoul district were located in caves cut out of rock formations in steep cliffs at different altitudes and were connected by communication routes and provided with various communication means.

The plateau was surrounded by mountains, rising 800 meters above it. In the center of the plateau was a hill. The road ran along the narrow Tangimarmoul passage in the intermontane area. To prevent the passage of Soviet troops, the rebels mined this passage. In addition to the mines on the road, where armored vehicles of the 40th Army were being damaged, explosive charges from aerial bombs were laid on the mountain slopes. The charges were wired together into a single network capable of causing landslides on the Soviet and Afghan units.

On the heights, where the firing points of the rebels were located, during the operation in Marmoul, powerful aviation and artillery strikes were employed, after which groups of assault rifle units and assault groups landed along the entire circumference of the plateau. Following them in the district were units of motorized maneuver groups, which completed the rout of the base area. During operations in the caves of Marmoul, a large number of warehouses with weapons and ammunition were seized, the entrance to them was mined. In one of the caves a prison was found.

== The Marmoul operation in February 1983, the causes and course of the operation ==
The Soviet Union provided its Afghan ally with a large-scale assistance in the industrialization of the country. The construction and operation of many plants and factories in many cities of Afghanistan such as Kabul, Herat, Puli Khumri and other cities of Afghanistan was carried out by Soviet civilian experts.

On January 2, 1983, sixteen Soviet civilian specialists, who were contracted to build a bakery near the city of Mazar-i-Sharif, were abducted while returning from a working shift. A group of armed men blocked their bus on the road, took the Soviet citizens captive and led them to the Marmoul area.

Marshal of the Soviet Union S.L. Sokolov, who was in Kabul at the time, ordered an army operation to search for the missing Soviet citizens and the liquidation of the armed formation that had organized their abduction.

According to Soviet intelligence, the Mujahideen field commanders of the northern front, could mobilize more than 1,300 militants from local villages. According to the plan of the headquarters of the 40th Army, the military operation was to be carried out by air landing groups to block the way out of the gorge, with the further elimination of the enemy's manpower and the seizure of his material assets.

The plan for the Marmoul operation in 1983 was developed promptly. However, the command did not have precise information about the strength of Zabiullah's group. The collected intelligence indicated a good defensive capability of the base area. In the city of Mazar-i-Sharif, an operational group was formed to search for the abducted Soviets. For this purpose it was given control of part of the 201st motorized rifle division.

The search lasted for a whole month. During this period, all military operations were stopped in the area. Adverse weather conditions made the search difficult. In the first days, on January 3, the corpse of one of the plant adjusters was discovered in the channel of a mountain stream, not far from the village of Marmoul. The others could not be found.

On the orders of the commander of the 40th Army, General VF Ermakov launched the operation. On January 30, in the mountainous area near the village of Marmoul, landing groups were set up to conduct reconnaissance and search operations. The search group captured a 16-year-old local boy, who told them that he had seen a group of captured Soviet specialists in the village of Wardak, in the house of the local mullah. A team of 50 Afghan KhAD troops was flown to Wardak urgently. The operation was conducted by 20 Mi-8 transport helicopters and the same number of Mi-24 attack helicopters. During the landing of the landing groups from the second pair of Mi-8, a heavy machine gun fire was opened from the mullah's house. Landing of the paratroopers from the Mi-8 covered the combat helicopters Mi-24.

Shooting at the Soviets, in a hurry, not finishing off the wounded, so as not to get involved in the fight, the rebels quickly retreated into the mountains. During the fleeting battle several Soviet soldiers were wounded. According to the survivors, the released wounded specialists, their kidnapping and public execution had both a propagandistic and intimidating purpose. The execution was carried out after a sermon in front of the local population. The field commander presented the captured Soviets as military pilots who bombed Afghan villages and called upon the population of Marmoul to wage a ruthless war on the infidels.

The reconnaissance, motorized rifle, antiaircraft artillery units of the units of the 201st Motorized Rifle Division, the special purpose of the GRU GSh, were involved in the operation; 40 combat helicopters (MI-8 and MI-24). Parts of the 18th and 20th Infantry Division of the DRA Armed Forces, a separate commando brigade and the operational regiment of sarandoy were drawn from Afghan government forces. The fighting took place in difficult climatic conditions. There was a strong squally wind, it was raining with snow. Active fighting in the area of the Marmoul gorge lasted nine days, of which a week the Soviet troops advanced under the continuous fire of the enemy.

A week later, the head of the operation, the deputy chief of staff of the 40th Army, Major-General SN. Shevchenko ordered the landing of tactical airborne assault forces in the area of combat operations on the routes to exit the canyon. The capture of mountain peaks, passes, approaches and gorges and the blocking of the base area was carried out by tactical air assault forces, while other units, left the base area in various directions and destroyed the enemy group.

During the capture of the base area in the Marmoul gorge in 1983, similar to operations: Smerch, Manoeuvre, Zapadnya, Uragan, in the Black Mountains, air cover was used. The rebel group was blocked in an isolated mountainous area and with the further approach of the main forces, it was defeated.

During the operation conducted in harsh winter conditions of the high mountains (2500 meters above sea level), the skillful actions of the reconnaissance and landing company of the 783rd separate reconnaissance battalion of the 201st motorized rifle division, under the command of Senior Lieutenant I.N. Ploskonos, enabled the unit to hold their position and block the rebels' escape from encirclement. For the successful actions of the unit entrusted to him, and for the courage and heroism manifested at the same time, I.N. Ploskonos was awarded the title of Hero of the Soviet Union.

During the earlier stages of the operation, a large number of long-term firing positions were established by the insurgents on the dominant heights. The entrances to the caves were carefully disguised, with natural plantations. In the caves, connected by long tunnels, weapon storage, ammunition, medicines and foodstuffs were located. In the mountain labyrinths, the Soviet divisions found two prisons, with special means for interrogation. In the same place, bodies of captured Afghan soldiers were found, with signs of heavy torture. In the gorge, an active rolling stock was discovered including trucks and off-road vehicles.

== The Marmoul operation of 1984 ==
The Marmoul operation in 1984 was the only military operation of the Red Banner Central Asia Border District (KSAPO) of the KGB in the history of the Afghan war (1979-1989), conducted under the directive of the Minister of Defense of the USSR, Marshal of the Soviet Union D.F. Ustinov. The plan of the operation was approved by the Chairman of the KGB Yuri Andropov and Marshal of the Soviet Union Sergey Sokolov, the commander of the operation was Major-General G.A. Zgersky.

The command of the 40th Army was tasked with liquidating the rebel mountain bases in the Marmoul gorge. In the operation conducted in January–February 1984, 3 motorized maneuver groups, 4 assault landing groups, 30 helicopters, 9 Afghan infantry battalions, 1 combined artillery battalion of the 201st motorized rifle division and 1 fighter regiment were involved. The grouping formed the starting position of the city of Mazar-i-Sharif, and the Headquarters of the operation was organized here. The operation was conducted on the basis of operational data.

In the course of military operations, the blocking of the rebel forces was carried out by the disembarkation of ten groups of tactical airborne assault. The units of the Armed Forces of the DRA, acting as part of two detouring detachments from the east and west, blocked the Marmoul depression. At the initial positions, the search groups of Afghan servicemen were inserted by Mi-8 helicopters and operated under their cover fire. The large-scale actions of Soviet troops along a broad front were preceded by powerful artillery and aviation preparation, during which anti-aircraft fire weapons were suppressed, minefields and controlled landmines were undermined. Unable to withstand the onslaught, the rebels left the base, leaving in the caves a huge amount of weapons and ammunition.

== Preceding events and scheduling an operation ==
From the Marmoul district, detachments and rebel groups constantly made sorties to attack targets in Mazar-i-Sharif, and the plans of the Soviet military representatives in Kabul planned operation in the Marmoul Gorge were given great importance. The presence of an active Mujahideen base area in close proximity to the capital of northern Afghanistan, Mazar-i-Sharif, was deemed inadmissible by the command of the 40th Army.

Established in the territory of the Democratic Republic of Afghanistan, the border troops of the USSR made it possible to significantly intensify their activities. There were private and joint combat operations with units of the 40th Army. Interaction was carried out with the units of the army of the armed forces of the DRA, units of the border troops, Tsarandoya (Ministry of Internal Affairs) and Khad of the Ministry of State Security of Afghanistan.

In January 1984, the chief of the main command and control of the troops of KSAPO, Major-General G.A. Zgersky was ordered to arrive at the Marshal of the Soviet Union Sokolov Sokolov. with a preliminary operation plan, in Kabul. At a meeting in Kabul, the Marshals of the Soviet Union - Sokolov SL. and Akhromeev, listened attentively to the report of Major-General G.A. Zgersky, compared the available reconnaissance data on the enemy's forces, the geography of the area and, having approved the plan of the operation, promised the general every support. The preliminary plan for the operation was also discussed with the Commander of the Turkestan Military District (TurkVO), General of the Army Yu.P. Maksimov. By the decision of the Marshals of the Soviet Union, the command of the operation was entrusted to Major-General G.A. Zgersky.

The weather in the area of the Marmoul gorge in early January 1984 was changing. At the beginning of the operation, the troops were alerted for four days. With the arrival of General Zagersky GA in Mazar-i-Sharif from Kabul. A positive weather forecast was obtained - for several days ahead and the operation began. Given the difficult conditions of the mountainous region, the presence of powerful strong points with echeloned and multi-tiered defense, extensive areas of mine-explosive obstacles, significant forces and resources were invested in the operation.

According to the command directive of the 40th Army, aviation support during the operation to the troops of the KSAPO was provided by the Air Force from 24 airplanes of fighter-bombers. There were also 30 helicopters of KSAPO troops, personnel of 5 (five) -MMG and ShMGG (maneuverable and assault-assault groups) of KSAPO (about two thousand servicemen). By decision of the commander of Turkmenistan, the KSAPO troops were assigned a combined artillery battalion of the 122-mm howitzers of the motor rifle regiment of the 201st MSD, the 40th Army fighter regiment regiments that played an important role in the operation, the battalions of the 18th and 20th infantry divisions of the DRA aircraft.

The idea of the operation of 1984 - with the words of the head of the operation, Major-General Zgersky GA. consisted of the following actions: covering the entrance to the canyon by MMG forces and batteries of 122 mm-howitzers, to strike aviation and artillery strikes against the base area, all Mujahideen strongholds equipped on the peaks surrounding the Marmoul depression, then simultaneously landing 10 assault groups, 70 men each, to destroy the enemy in strong points equipped around Marmoul and to organize the defense of this area by two bypassing detachments of the 18th Infantry Division of the Armed Forces of the DRA under the command of the Major's Advisor, Major V.N. Vahreneva on converging directions along the tops of the ridge to complete the rout of the retreating enemy and prevent a reinforcement approach to him.

In the future, methodical fire raids destroy the minefields on the approaches and inside the canyon. After completing the demining of the area with the help of road engineering equipment, to expand the narrowness in the canyon, to make a colonial path, ensuring the advancement of the technique of moto-maneuvering groups to the Marmoul depression.

The border guards got the task to liquidate the mountain bases of the rebels. One of the first such was Marmoul operations, conducted in January–February 1984. Three moto-groups, four assault maneuvering groups, 30 helicopters, 9 Afghan infantry battalions, 1 combined artillery battalion of the 201st Motorized Infantry Division and 1 Fighter Aviation Regiment participated in it. The operation was headed by the Chief of the Sapo Army, Major-General G.A. Zgersky.

The grouping formed the initial position on the Afghan territory - in the city of Mazar-i-Sharif. From here, the operation was managed. The operation was conducted without military intelligence on the basis of operational data.

The only way to enter the Marmoul gorge remained a powerful fire defending the defenders from the front with simultaneous active actions of landing groups outside the ridge.

In the course of military operations, rebel forces were blocked by ten simultaneously landed border guard units. The units of the Afghan army, acting as part of two detachments from the east and west, blocked the Marmoul depression. Under the fire cover of helicopters, the groups of Afghan servicemen landed from them were thrown to the initial positions and carried out search operations.

Actions on a broad front with considerable forces were preceded by powerful artillery and aviation preparation, during which the enemy's air defense weapons were reliably suppressed, minefields and controlled landmines were cleared. Unable to resist the onslaught of troops, the rebels left the base, leaving a huge amount of weapons and ammunition in the caves.

The operation began with air and artillery strikes against strong points and rebel firing positions, holding the dominant heights of the single mountain pass and access to the main base in Marmoul. An artillery battery of 122 mm howitzers was placed in front of the canyon at a distance of 5–6 km. Before it, the defense was occupied by units of the troops of KSAPO, who carried out an order to cover the artillery battery, and made ready to move into the canyon. The detachments completed the liquidation of the strong points and combed the terrain. A great deal of work was done by deminers to clear the area and the colonial tracks in the area of the operation.

Before the entrance to the canyon, large-scale charges of incendiary aerial bombs and landmines were mounted into the rock, with remotely controlled mines laid on them. Mine barriers were consolidated into a single network. Undermining the charges and the collapse of the rock, leading to blockages on the roads, the rebels planned to block the way to the armored vehicles of the Soviet troops. The narrow passage to the ravine, in the future, was planned to be used by the enemy to draw equipment and troops into the depths, where by ruptures of landmines and firing into the rear, to defeat, not allowing reinforcements to come up.

Head of Operation Lieutenant-General G.A. Zgersky wrote in his memoirs that Marmoul, a village located in a basin surrounded on all sides by high mountains, their peaks defended the rebel firing points. The only road from the flat part of the foothills to the Marmoul depression, suitable for the movement of horse transport, passed along a deep canyon with sheer rocks, 3.5 km long, whose width in the narrowest part was 3.6 meters.

In the rocks on the walls of the canyon caves were made, where warehouses were located. The entrance to the canyon, as well as the road, were mined. The management of minefields was remote. The entrance to the canyon is blocked by landmines consisting of an incendiary aerial bomb with mines imposed on it, controlled remotely.

Established in the territory of the Democratic Republic of Afghanistan, the grouping of border troops led to a significant activation of the actions of the opposition forces. In the Marmoul area, further private, border troops and joint operations were conducted with units of the 40th Army. Interaction was carried out with the units of the army of the Armed Forces and the border troops of the DRA, the battalions of Tsarandoy and the Ministry of State Security of Afghanistan.

The stages of the operation in the Marmoul gorge in a sequential order consisted of: massive artillery preparation, powerful air strikes against the rebel strongholds, subsequent landing on the dominant heights, the MMG and DPMG landing groups. In the future, after the reconnaissance actions of the area and its demining, the main forces of the troops were introduced into the region. The completion of the operation was to destroy the base area and capture rebels in the warehouses: weapons, ammunition, medicines.

== Results of the Marmoul operation in 1984 ==
Upon completion of the defeat of the enemy and his base, in Marmoul was left Moto-maneuvering group, which was there before the withdrawal of troops from the DRA. It was not possible to restore the mutually beneficial military base in all respects to the rebels. The operation lasted 12 days. 8 rebel strongholds were destroyed. Partially destroyed and captured warehouses with weapons, ammunition and other military assets of the enemy; destroyed about 500 rebels, including field commander Mohammad Zabibullo.

== The Marmoul operation in 1985 ==
The «Marmoul Operation of 1985 was» conducted in three stages. To the jump sites, the units got on their armored vehicles. After loading into the Mi-8 helicopters, tactical air assault groups were landed in the mountains. During the landing, the enemy did not manage to seriously resist, most of it was destroyed, and the rest surrendered.

Caves with a large quantity of weapons and ammunition were captured. In one of the caves was found a hospital with modern medical equipment, a large number of medicines and food. The operating room, the hospital room, rest rooms were provided with energy from alternative power sources, powerful diesel generators and dimensional storage batteries. Among the medical staff of the hospital were Afghans and several female doctors from France. As it became known later, Ahmad Shah Massoud closely interacted with French official representatives.

== Soviet and Russian literature ==
- V.Nosatov "Faryab Diary" Memoirs of the Chiefs of the troops of KSAPO (1980-1984), Lieutenant-General G.A. Zhersky (V.Nosatov - chief of the department of the Central Office of the FSB of Russia) about the Marmoul operation in 1984
- "Frontier guards in the Afghan war" Afgan: The last war of the USSR Publisher: Yauza,: Eksmo Moskva Publishing year: 2013 ISBN 978-5-699-68622-3
- A.B. Culeba "Wings of the special services of Russia: pages of the history of aviation of the troops and security agencies of Russia" Border, 2009 Total pages: 136, 137/263
- O. Belov "Death of Soviet specialists in Mazar-i-Sharif" Krushinsky Yu.D.
- O. Belov "The Marmoul Operation". Mazar-i-Sharif. "Marmoul", senior lieutenant Oleg Belov 154 OOSPN GRU. Akcha-Aybak (1981-1983) "The Muslim Battalion"
- I. Belov "MARMOuL'S CONSUMPTION" magazine "Veteran of the Border", January–March 2014, p. 42-45]
- I.D. Yarkov "On the Perimeter of the Border of Afghanistan: Notes of the General of Border Guards of the KGB of the USSR" (about the Marmoul Operation of 1983") / 2 nd ed., Ed. - Novosibirsk: Publishing House of the National Library of National Economy, 2010. - 352 p.ББК 68. 571 UDC 355 Я-744 (24) л. yl. ISBN 978-5-88742-081-3 General I.D. Yarkov - deputy chief of the troops of KSAPO, head of the Operational Group for Communications from the Border Troops of the KGB of the USSR with the Operations Group of the General Staff of the USSR Armed Forces and the Office of the Chief Military Adviser in Kabul, Deputy Chief Military Adviser for Border Guards - adviser to the Commander of the Border Troops of the Democratic Republic of Afghanistan
- O. Krivopalov "The Cradle of the Chirchik Special Forces" Colonel Spn
- O. Kryvopalov Unapproachable Marmoul (154 OOSPN, February 1983). The newspaper "Third Toast" No. 21 (357), 2007, Ukrainian Union of Afghan Veterans (soldiers-internationalists) On the Marmoul Operation of 1983
- Schennikov VV "Milestones of the Guard Route of the Guards Regiment" source: "Art of war" On the Regular Character of the Marmoul Operations]
- V.Zubov In the sky over Afghanistan Border of Russia No. 5, February 4–10 about the Marmoul operation
- Novikov VS "The pilot-border guard General Rokhlov. Portrait on the background of the border and the era. Gallery, 2014.- с.400 About the Marmoul operation of 1984
- "OPERATION FOR THE SAVING OF SOVIET SPECIALISTS BEARED IN MAZARI-SHARIF" From the newspaper "Vecherniy Minsk" from February 15, 2006, No. 37 (11009)
- Army operation Marmoul in March 1983 From the book: "ON THE PERIMETER OF THE BORDER OF AFGHANISTAN: Notes of the General of the Border Troops of the KGB of the USSR" / I.D. Yarkov.-2 nd ed., Rev. - Novosibirsk: Publishing House of NNSUB, 2010. - 352 p. On the Marmoul operation in 1983
- 'AT. Cossacks "Remember, the Cloud!". The book is the fourth. Stories about brave pilots of all time]
- Stodeyrevsky I.Yu. "Notes of an officer of the special forces of the GRU" chapter of Marmoul S. 76–79 «On the Marmoul operation of 1983»
- Gordeev S.N. MARMOUL OPERATION
- O. Ulyatovy "Profession - SAPER" magazine "Veteran of the Border", January–March 2014, p. 36-41 About the Marmoul operation in 1983
