= Mohammad Zabihullah =

Mohammad Zabihullah محمد ذبیح الله
- Born: Afghanistan
- Died: 14 December 1984; Afghanistan
- Occupation: Mujahideen leader

Mohammad Zabihullah was an anti-Soviet resistance leader in Afghanistan in the 1980s. Zabihullah was a former religious school teacher, member of the Jamiat-e Islami movement, and lead the faction in Balkh Province until his assassination by KhAD in December 1984, which threw his resistance in Balkh into disarray.

He commanded Balkh with several thousand fighters and was one of the best known commanders to the Western press in the 1980-1984 period. He had been described as an "excellent organizer." Zabiullah, like Massoud, also established civil administration in his region such as literacy classes and schools.

On 14 December 1984, Zabihullah was killed when his Jeep ran over a landmine.
