= Mohammad Nabi Azimi =

Afghan General (1943 - 2021)

- Born: 11 August 1943; Kabul, Kingdom of Afghanistan
- Died: 3 March 2021 (aged 77); Tashkent, Uzbekistan
- Military career
- Allegiance: Democratic Republic of Afghanistan
- Branch: Afghan Army
- Rank: General
- Nickname: Nabi
- Commands: 14th Division (Ghazni); 17th Division (Herat); 7th Division (Kabul); Deputy Defense Minister and Garrison Commander of Kabul
- Conflicts: 1973 Afghan coup d'état Soviet-Afghan war
- Other work: Writer

General Mohammad Nabi Azimi. (Dari: جنرال محمد نبی عظیمی) was the Deputy Defense Minister of the Democratic Republic of Afghanistan (DRA) who played a critical role in the fall of President Mohammad Najibullah. General Mohammad Nabi Azimi was an ethnic Tajik who belonged to the Parcham faction of the People's Democratic Party of Afghanistan. He was also the ambassador to the United Kingdom.

== Role in the Second Battle of Zhawar ==
In 1986, General Azimi was in charge of the DRA forces at the Second Battle of Zhawar in Paktia Province which was waged against mujahideen forces under Jalaluddin Haqqani. The large-scale offensive against the mujahideen base quickly ran into difficulties: Numerous operative battalions of the 38th Commando Brigade were wiped out in a botched heliborne assault against fortified positions, as some commandos mistakenly landed in Pakistan. General Azimi withdrew to Kabul on "important business" and ordered the arrest of the helicopter unit commander. He was replaced by another DRA officer and a Soviet general took over the operation.

== Post-Soviet withdrawal ==
In 1990, along with General Abdul Rashid Dostum, General Azimi was involved in the fight against Hezb-i Islami.

In early 1992, DRA leader Najibullah lost control of Northern Afghanistan, following the defection of the pro-government militia of Abdul Rashid Dostum, and on March 18, he announced his intention to resign. General Azimi, now Deputy Defense Minister, chose to defect, along with Army Chief of Staff Muhammad Asif Delawar and Kabul garrison commander Abdul Wahid Baba Jan. General Azimi appeared on Afghanistan National Television saying, "I assure my countrymen that we will have peace in the very near future. There is no need for war anymore."

On March 21, General Azimi made contact with General Dostum, and on April 15, he flew 600-1000 of General Dostum's troops into Kabul Airport and took control of it. The next day in Kabul, Najibullah confronted General Azimi and the other generals and accused them of treason. Apparently afraid that General Azimi had taken control of his security detail, he then tried to flee to the airport. But, finding it controlled by hostile forces, he was forced to take refuge in a United Nations compound. General Azimi then made contact with resistance leader Ahmad Shah Massoud, and urged him to seize the capital. He hoped that he might effect a peaceful transition of power like Dostum had managed in Mazar-i-Sharif. However, Massoud was unwilling to do this, so long as an agreement to form a government had not been reached between the Pakistan-based mujahideen parties. He entered Kabul on April 25 in response to an offensive by Gulbuddin Hekmatyar, who had allied with officers from the Khalq faction to infiltrate the capital. Fighting between the opposing factions broke out immediately.

General Azimi has since written many books, one of which is titled "Ordu va Siyasat Dar Seh Daheh Akheer-e Afghanistan" ("Army and Politics in the Last Three Decades in Afghanistan") (Peshawar: Marka-e Nashrati Mayvand, 1998).
