= Zhawar =

Area in Khost, Afghanistan

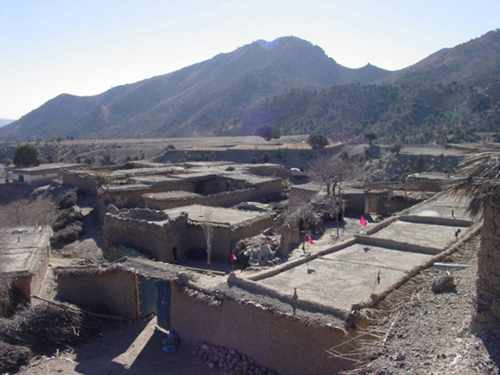
Zawar Kili village used by al Qaeda.

Zhawar is an area within the Khost Province of Afghanistan. (Note: Until 1985, it was part of Paktia Province.)

== Zhawar Kili ==
Jalaluddin Haqqani was known by Afghani mujahideen as master of the Zhawar Kili tunnel complex.

Mir Bahmanyar writes of the tunnels during 1986. He states there were tunnels carved into the rock face on the side facing Pakistan. The tunnels were ten metres long at the maximum, four metres wide and three metres tall. The tunnel sides had walls of brick. Altogether there were forty-one tunnels. The tunnels had doors of iron painted over with bright colours. All the tunnels were fitted with electrical power.

Zhawar Kili is suspected to have been an area where al Qaeda fighters regrouped after the bombardment of Tora Bora and is located at 33.148792 N, 69.912658 E.

The Zhawar Kili al Badr training camp was based here during 2002.

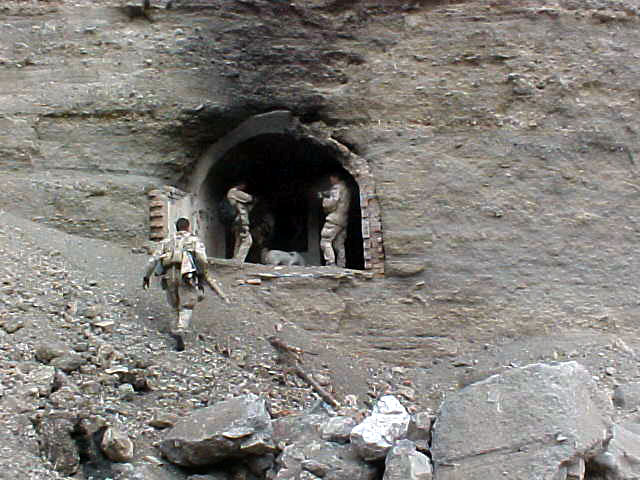
US Navy SEALs at a tunnel entrance within Zhawar Kili

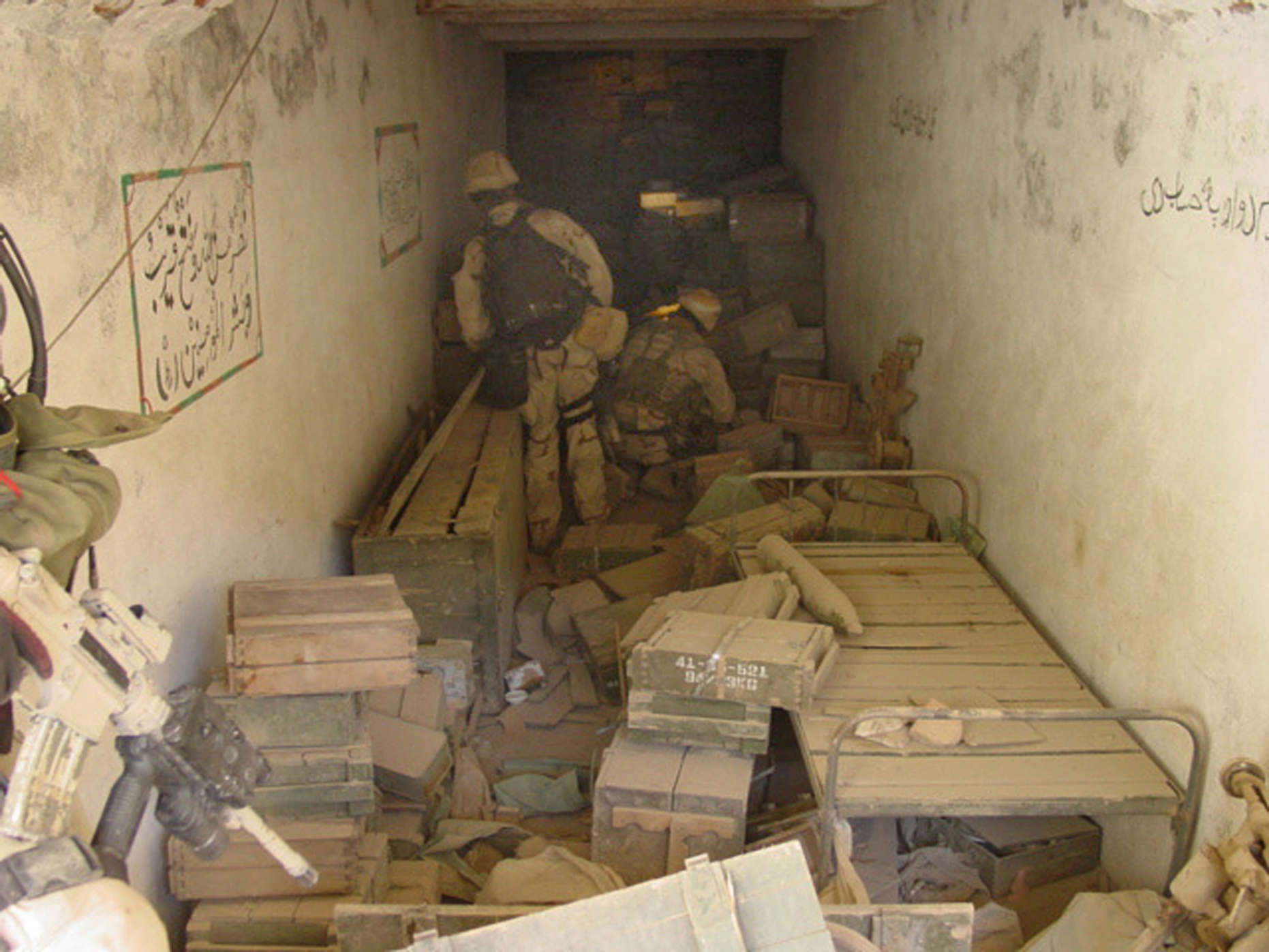
Within the tunnel

A statement published January 2002, showing the report of the deputy director of operations for the Joint Chiefs of Staff at the time, stated the site was a very large complex (approximately 4.8 by 4.8 kilometres square roughly). Rear Adm. J.D. Stufflebeem stated of the Zhawar Kili al Badr training camp, that it contained at least sixty buildings and tunnels of a number greater than fifty.

January 2002 saw the insertion of a supported Navy Seals team, who were positioned to perform reconnaissance. Upon discovering a complex of approximately seventy tunnels converted to facilities for ordnance, they instead proceeded to perform the destruction of this. At the location the men also found classrooms, rooms for cooking, quarters for sleep, and offices, which were constructed using bricks, concrete and steel beams.

=== Bombing ===
The location is the site of a suspected Taliban or al Qaeda base that was bombed in 1998 and 2001.

American cruise missiles bombed a suspected al Qaeda site in Zhawar Kili in 1998 in retaliation for the bombing of the American Embassies in Kenya and Tanzania in 1998.

The United States Air Force performed bombings during 2001. A bombing during November 2001, was indirectly caused by Richard A. Beck, a geologist at the University of Cincinnati who informed the Department of Defense he could identify the rocks showing within video footage of Osama bin Laden released during October 2001, from a field trip he had made to Khowst. Ascertainment of the location was facilitated by the utilization of GIS technology and remote sensing.

During 2002, a period of bombing began, apparently, during the 3rd of January, and included a period from the 6th to the 14th of January 2002. The United States (of America) Department of Defense released a video of the bombardment of Zhawar Kili during March 2002.

== Gallery ==
=== Location from above ===
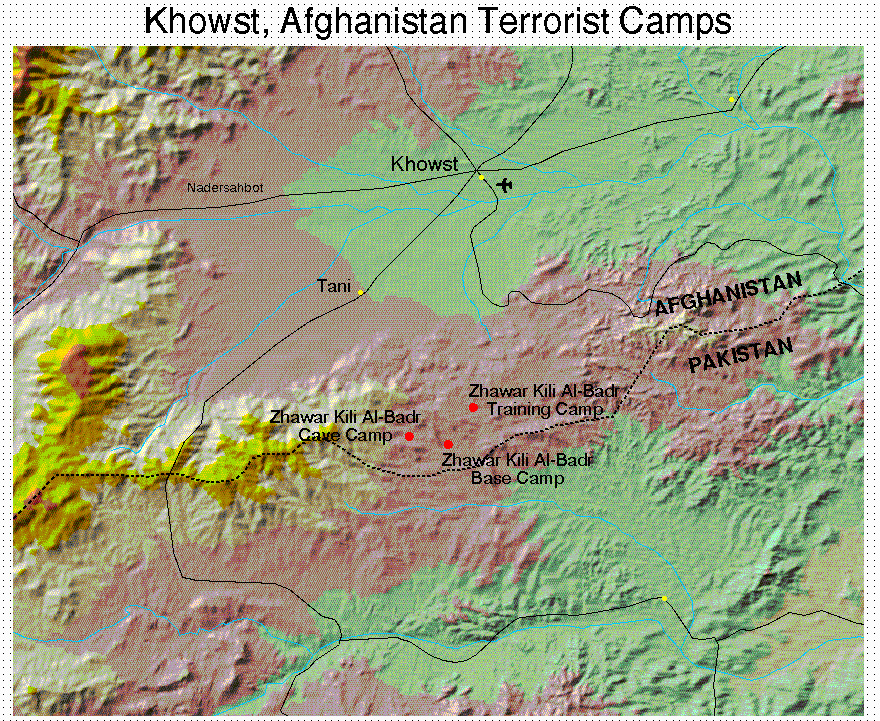
Zhawar Kili from a 1998 briefing

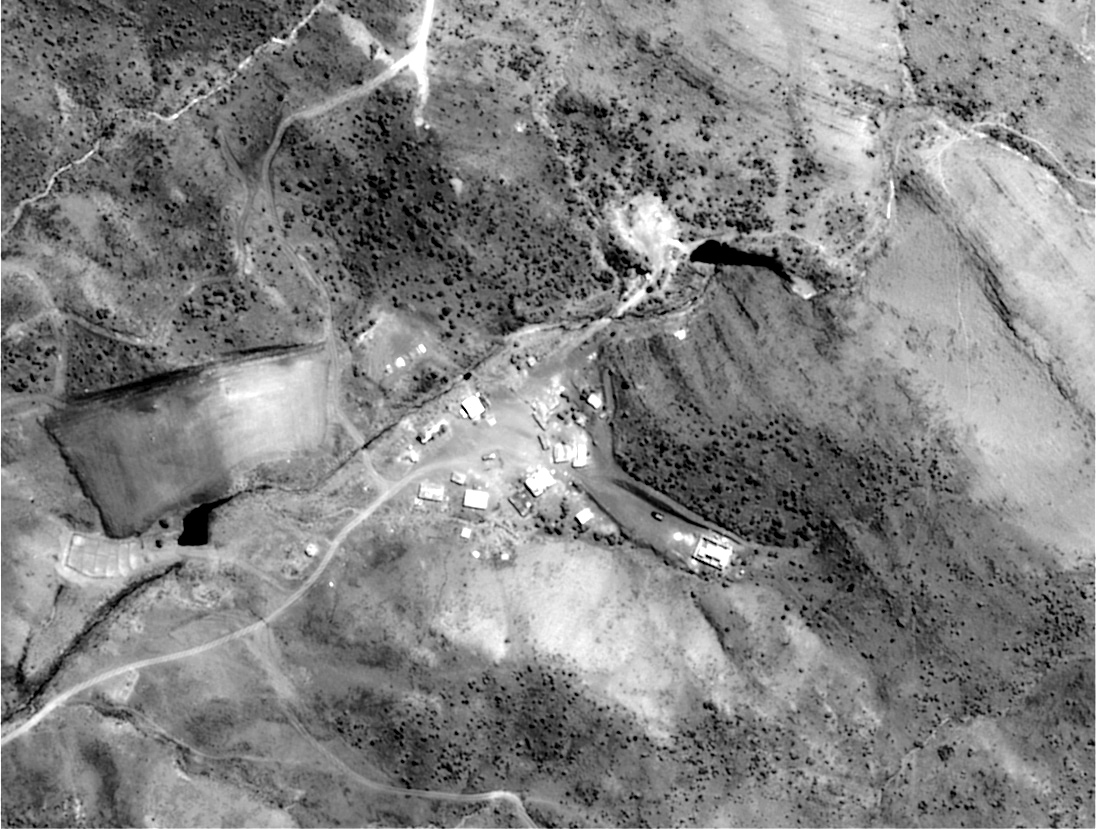
Zhawar Kili al Badr (West), circa 20th century

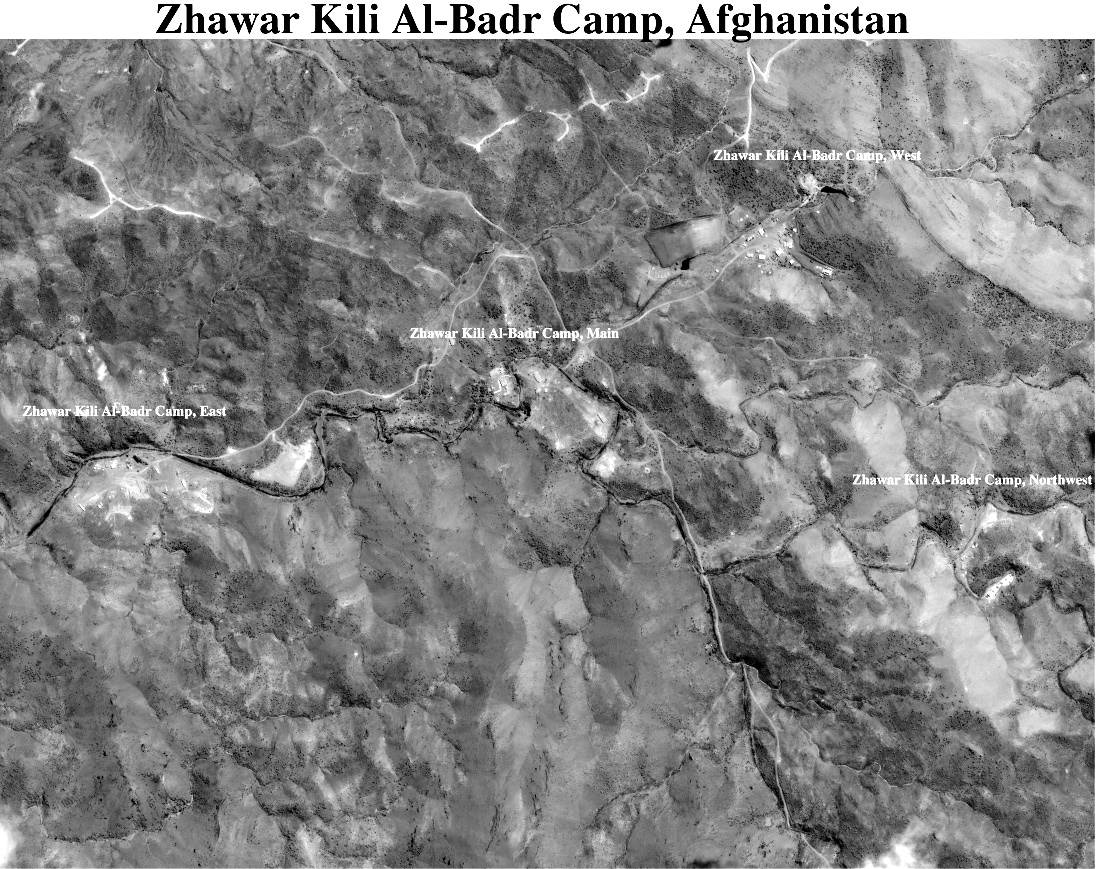
Zhawar Kili from a 2002 briefing

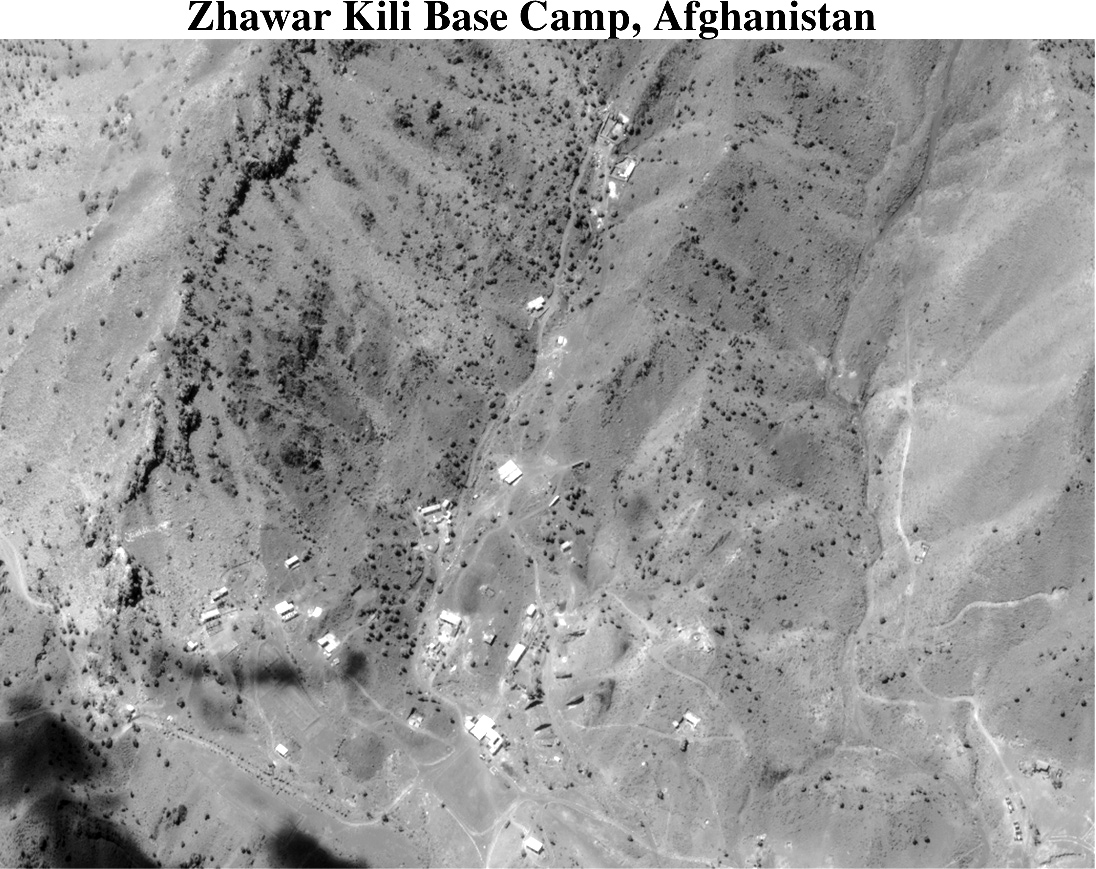
Zhawar Kili from a 2002 briefing

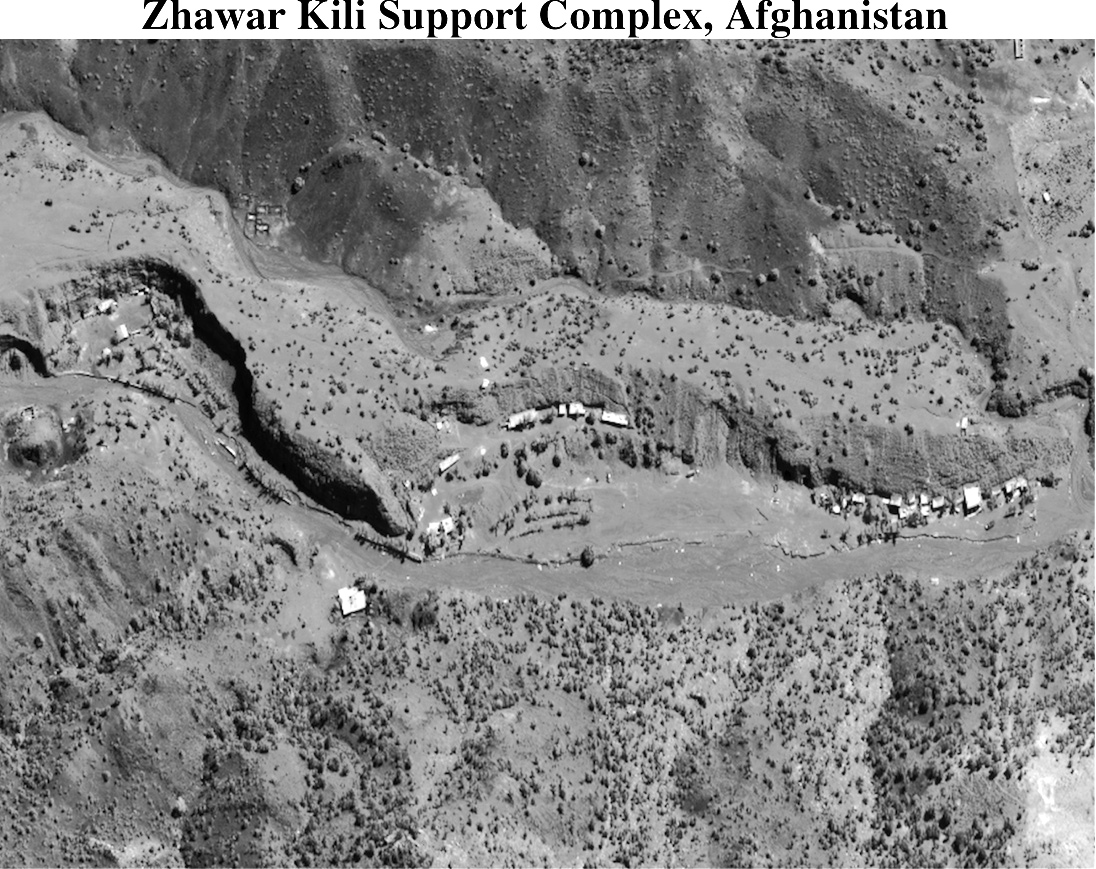
Zhawar Kili from a 2002 briefing

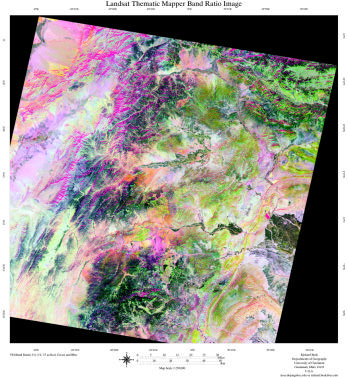
Landsat image of Zhawar Kili, in Khowst

== See also ==
- Qanat
- Tora Bora
