= WAD =

Former Afghan intelligence agency

- WAD emblem

Agency overview
- Formed: January 9, 1986; 40 years ago
- Dissolved: April 1992; 34 years ago
- Superseding agencies: NDS (2002–2021); GDI (2021–present)
- Type: Secret Police
- Employees: 90,000 (1990).
- Annual budget: $160 million (1986)

The Ministry of State Security (Pashto: د دولتي امنیت وزارت Dari: وزارت امنیت دولتی), known by its acronym WAD, is a former intelligence agency of the former Democratic Republic of Afghanistan, which succeeded KHAD. The WAD was disbanded in 1992 before the start of the 2nd Afghan Civil War. Despite the name change, most of the rank and file were dominated by Parchamis.

The Sarandoy reportedly cooperated with WAD agents.

== History ==
On 9 January 1986, KhAD was changed with its name to WAD with the agency becoming its own ministry. It was reported that WAD was placed in charge of controlling the Kabul Garrison. Its budget and size were expanded. However WAD would still often be referred to as KhAD and maintain the same functions from its predecessor. In 1987, WAD was behind many terrorist attacks on Pakistani soil including the Karachi Car bombing and an attempted car bombing on the US Consulate in Peshawar which ended up killing over 30 people.

The 1986 National Reconciliation Act, enacted by President Mohammad Najibullah, meant that the powers of individual WAD officers were reduced and they would have to consult with local police forces, shuras, and the provincial and district offices of the attorney general if they wanted to make any arrest.

WAD operatives additionally attempted to assassinate Gulbuddin Hekmatyar in 1987, using a remote-controlled car bomb and wounding two of his bodyguards. Other operations included the kidnapping of one of Massoud’s five brothers in Peshawar, as well as sending WAD assassination teams (paid in the equivalent of thousands of dollars) into Panjshir Province to assassinate Ahmad Shah Massoud.

In 1989, WAD-led forces, more specifically the Special Guard and the 904th Battalion, fought in the Battle of Jalalabad. In March 1990, Lieutenant-General Shahnawaz Tanai attempted a coup, which was suppressed by the WAD-led Afghan National Guard (Gard-e-Milli), General Khushal Peroz and Mohammad Aslam Watanjar.

During the civil war in the 1990s, Hezb-i-Islami, the Northern Alliance and the Taliban recruited ex-KhAD/WAD officers and agents to act as their moles operating behind enemy territory. WAD primarily acted as the intelligence arm of the Northern Alliance during the civil war in Afghanistan, even after the fall of the Afghan government in 1992.

== Structure ==
The WAD was known to have the following organizational structures in place:

- Directorate-General for Security: Ensure WAD's internal/external security.
- Directorate-General for Military Security: Successor of Military KHAD forces.
- Directorate-General for the Interior: Successor of Civilian KHAD activities on monitoring anti-government activities in and out of Afghanistan.

== Directors of WAD ==
No.	Director	Took office	Left office
1	Ghulam Faruq Yaqubi	6 December 1985	16 April 1992
2	Osman Sultani	16 April 1992	28 April 1992
