= Bazaars in Karachi =

There are bazaars in every neighborhood of Karachi, Pakistan. The most popular bazaars in Karachi are: Tariq Road, Bohri Bazaar, Soldier Bazaar, Sarafa Bazar, Meena Bazaar, Urdu Bazaar, etc. There are generally thousands of small individually-owned or family-owned shops and stalls in each old style Bazaar or shopping area. Only some of the newly built shopping malls in the suburban areas of city of Karachi may be managed by a large organization or a commercial company.

Saddar Town area is the old central shopping area in Karachi. Main streets for your shopping pleasure are Abdullah Haroon Road, Zaibunnisa Street, Zainab Market and Bohri Bazaar. For meats and groceries, you can head to the Empress Market. This is a vast Victorian structure in Mughal Gothic style, with a domineering 50 meters high clock tower in the front center of the building. Empress Market houses hundreds of shops and stalls so shoppers would have plenty of choice and a wide variety of consumer goods.

== See also ==
- Karachi
- Shopping malls in Karachi
