= Osama bin Laden's house in Khartoum =

Sudanese compound used from 1991 to 1996

- منزل أسامة بن لادن في الخرطوم
- Location within Sudan

General information
- Status: Completed
- Type: Compound
- Architectural style: Stucco
- Location: Sudan, Al-Mashtal Street, Al-Riyad, Khartoum, Sudan
- Coordinates: 15°34′54″N 32°34′22″E
- Groundbreaking: 1991 and 1996 (Where Osama Bin Laden Lived)
- Client: Osama Bin Laden
- Owner: Osama Bin Laden

Technical details
- Floor count: 3

Design and construction
- Known for: Osama bin Laden's house in Khartoum

Osama bin Laden's house in Khartoum is a pink and beige brick-and-stucco three-story house on Al-Mashtal Street in the affluent Al-Riyad quarter of Khartoum, Sudan, where Osama bin Laden lived between 1991 and 1996.

== Background ==
Osama bin Laden arrived in Sudan in 1991 after falling out with Saudi Arabia's ruling family over their support for the United States in the Gulf War against Iraq. He purchased this property and another in Soba, a one-storey unfurnished mud house on the western bank overlooking the Blue Nile where he spent many weekends with his family. He lived in Sudan with his four wives, four sons and daughter. Although he was extremely wealthy, both houses were described as very modest on purpose to adhere to his ideals of humble living. During his time in the country he heavily invested in the infrastructure and in agriculture and businesses. When he lived there he was more known as a "walking bank" than a successful organizer of terrorist operations. Hassan al-Turabi allowed bin Laden to live in Sudan on the condition that he would invest in Sudan. It is estimated that he may have invested US$50 million in Sudan. His investments consisted of his militant activity, a bank, trading firm, Wadi al Aqiq, construction industry, which built roads throughout North Sudan, and the largest of all was the Al-Damazin Farms which employed 4,000 people, near the Upper Nile region close to the Ethiopian border. All of these activities he managed with his nine-room office manned by veteran business men supported by 400 Sudanese men at a salary of $200 a month.

Although the house was heavily guarded with guards armed with machine guns on the ground floor, bin Laden once missed an assassination attempt at this house attempted by Takfiris, an ultra extremist group who considered bin Laden's ways as heretic. Following this attack, his house was made more secure with more guards and trenches dug in front and back of the house. This caused inconvenience to his neighbours who then wished that bin Laden would leave their neighbourhood. After living in Sudan for more than 4 years, he left Sudan in May 1996, bitterly disappointed with political developments in the country he had invested so much in. It was reported that the Chinese embassy took over the property as a residence in the years after bin Laden's departure, but by 2011 it was said to have remained vacant since bin Laden was expelled from the country in 1996 because tenants feared that the United States might bomb it.

== Description ==
Richard Miniter describes the house as follows:

On El Meshtal Street, a visitor finds bin Laden's walled compound. The exterior walls are pink and faded to filth. The house is not the most opulent in this Sudanese version of Bel Air. It is a vaguely Art Deco affair, three stories high, with a ridge running up its front. Everything about the exterior of the house indicates comfort. An aluminium-frame walkway topped with thin wooden slats assures shade from the driveway to the front door. Air conditioners hum.

The house was secured with a compound wall, painted pink but faded. At the sides of the house are a series of walled-in compounds. This house was much more spacious and comfortable than the houses he lived in Afghanistan and Pakistan and bin Laden kept his office on the second floor. He would even meet people in the open yard in front of his house. He also owned guest houses across the street which he purchased as homes for his top officers.

It is also said that bin Laden lived a very simple life. He owned no vehicles, and used no modern home appliances such as a refrigerator or air conditioner. He was reportedly also involved in experimental farming including Al-Damazin Farms. As of 2011 the gate to bin Laden's old house was tightly shut, and the unkempt garden and wild tree branches growing over the wall stand out in such a wealthy, well-maintained part of the city.

== See also ==
- Osama bin Laden's compound in Abbottabad
