= Ramzan Chhipa =

Pakistani philanthropist and social worker

Muhammad Ramzan Chhipa HI SI
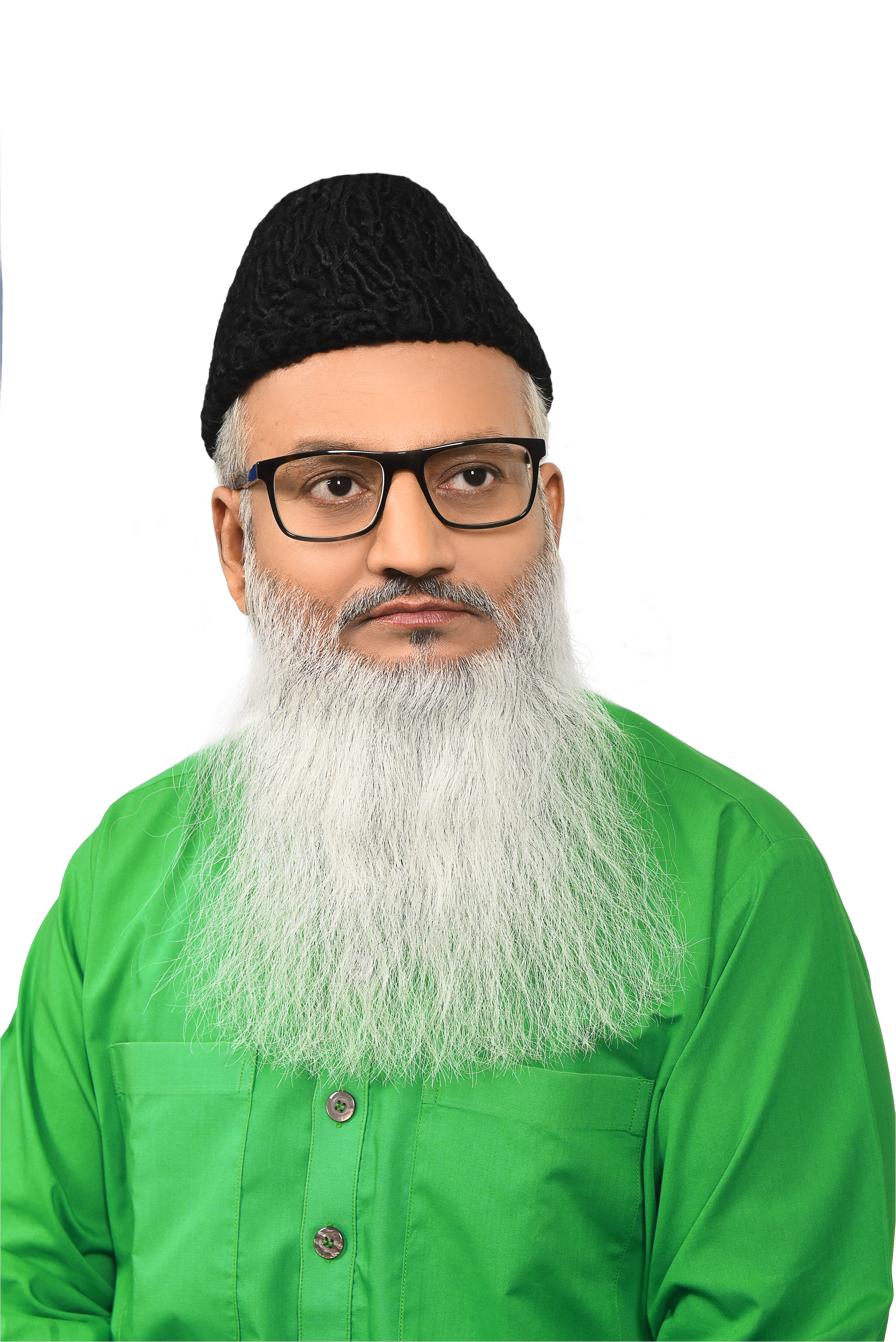
- Born: 9 October 1971 (age 54); Karachi, Sindh, Pakistan
- Other name: Chhipa Sahab
- Organization: Chhipa Welfare Association
- Known for: Social Work
- Awards: Hilal-i-Imtiaz (Crescent of Excellence) Award by the President of Pakistan in 2023; Sitara-i-Imtiaz (Star of Excellence) Award by the President of Pakistan in 2013; Gold Medal in 2013 by the FPCC organization * Honorary Membership of Karachi Press Club in 2014; Honorary Doctor of Letters degree in 2014
- Website: Official website

Muhammad Ramzan Chhipa (Urdu: محمد رمضان چھیپا; born 9 October 1971) is a Pakistani philanthropist and social worker. He is the founder of Chhipa Welfare Association, an NGO in Pakistan known for its social work and the second largest ambulance service in Pakistan.

His welfare organization has a fleet of over 500 ambulances, which are manned by volunteers and equipped with first-aid boxes, oxygen cylinders and stationed at over 150 Chhipa Ambulance centers in prominent and vital places, on various city road roundabouts and near government hospitals across Karachi city and other regions of Pakistan, for providing immediate help and assistance to the needy, sick, suffering people and emergency patients.

The 1987 Karachi car bombing at Bohri Bazaar led Ramzan Chhipa to found Chhipa Welfare Association.

In late January 2025, Chhipa provided shelter and support to American Onijah Robinson who became an Internet phenomenon after travelling to Pakistan in a failed attempt to marry a Pakistani man she met online.

== Awards ==
- On 23 March 2013, Sindh Governor Dr Ishrat Ul Ebad Khan conferred Sitara-e-Imtiaz (Star of Excellence) to Ramzan Chhipa for his social welfare work.
- On 22 June 2013, Ramzan Chhipa received the Gold Medal by the Federation of Pakistan Chambers of Commerce & Industry (FPCCI) Achievement Award for his work with the Chhipa Welfare Association.
- On 16 March 2016, Karachi Press Club had enrolled eminent social worker and patron-in-chief of Chhipa Welfare Association Ramzan Chhipa as Honorary Member Ship of Press club in recognition to his astounding services in the social sector.
- On 14 November 2014, Honorary Doctor of Letters degree by the University of Karachi and Governor of Sindh to Ramzan Chhipa for his Social Welfare Services in 2014.
- On 16 September 2014, Karachi Metropolitan Corporation Names 4000 to 16000 road as "MUHAMMAD RAMZAN CHHIPA ROAD" in Korangi.
- On 14 August 2016, The Federal Urdu University presented an Award "Nishan-e-Sipas" to emanate Social Worker Ramzan Chhipa to the 69th Independence Day of Pakistan.
- On 4 July 2020, Prime Minister Imran Khan presented an Award of COVID-19 to Ramzan Chhipa for the service for fight against in COVID-19.
- On 8 May 2021, "Comendition Award" was presented to Ramzan Chhipa as a validation to the Humanatarion Service during COVID-19.
- On 18 February 2022, Punjab Governor Chaudary Muhammad Sarwar, on Friday has conferred "Governor Award" upon Ramzan Chhipa emanate social activist for there outstanding services in serving humanity.
- On 8 August 2023, "Development leadership Award" Mr Ahsan Iqbal awarded the accolade to Ramzan Chhipa.
- On 23 December 2023, Award by FPCCI.To Ramzan Chhipa in recognition of his outstanding social and welfare services to Pakistan and humanity.
- Hilal-e-Imtiaz (Crescent of Excellence) Award by the President of Pakistan in 2023.
