= Chhipa Welfare Association =

Pakistani non-profit welfare organization

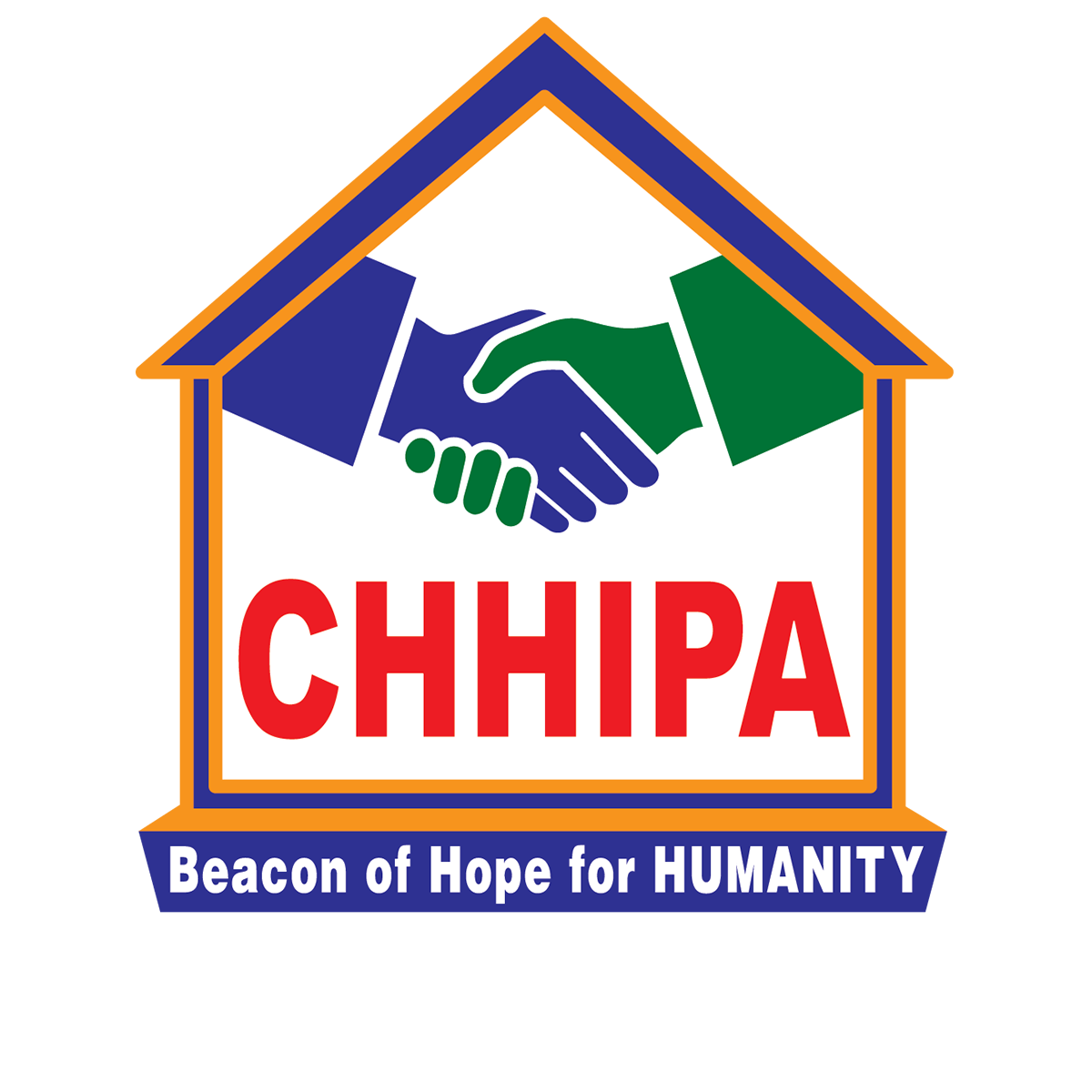
- Abbreviation: CWA
- Formation: 1987; 39 years ago
- Type: International nongovernmental organization
- Legal status: Association
- Headquarters: Karachi, Pakistan
- Location: Shahrah-e-Faisal, Karachi
- Region served: Karachi (Primarily)
- Founder: Ramzan Chhipa
- Website: chhipa.org

Chhipa Welfare Association, commonly known as Chhipa, is a Pakistani non-profit welfare organization founded in 1987 by Ramzan Chhipa. It is headquartered in Karachi, Pakistan.

The 1987 Karachi car bombing at Bohri Bazaar led Ramzan Chhipa to found Chhipa Welfare Association.

Its stated mission is a strong commitment to serving the people without discrimination of any caste, creed or colour under all circumstances, where frequent road accidents, sudden events, and emergencies occur daily. The Chhipa Welfare Association is a non-governmental organization in Pakistan. Its activities include financial aid and free or low-cost food to people with low income. The general public, philanthropists and the business community supports this organization with their donations.

The services include:

- Chhipa Ambulance Service
- Chhipa Dastarkhawan
- Chhipa Orphanage
- Chhipa Morgue
- Chhipa Kitchen
- Chhipa Monthly Ration Bag
- Chhipa Ritual Bathing Room
- Chhipa Ghusal & Kaffan
- Chhipa Mobile Morgue
- Chhipa Graveyard
- Chhipa Jhoola
- Chhipa Newborn Home
- Chhipa Old Home
- Chhipa Women Shelter Home

== Activities ==
=== Ambulances ===
The Chhipa Welfare Association runs a number of ambulance centres in Karachi. The ambulances are basic vans with room for a stretcher, for transportation to a hospital but without any medical staff in the ambulance. The humanitarian services of Chhipa Welfare Association, with a large fleet of dedicated fleet of ambulances, staffed by paramedics and equipped with a first aid box and an oxygen cylinder, spread over Chhipa Ambulance Emergency Centres located at prominent places, at various road roundabouts and near hospitals across the city of Karachi and other regions of Pakistan, on alert––around the clock all year around––for providing immediate help and assistance to the needy, the seriously injured victims of road accidents, train collisions, disasters and calamities, shifting the sick and emergency patients, rushing them to hospitals and medical facilities.

=== Chhipa Jhoola ===
The association provides a means for people who are unable to care for their newborn children to give them up for adoption, as an alternative to abandoning the child, and to lessen the risk of infanticide. The ambulance centers include a palna (lit. "cradle") where people can leave their babies; the Chhipa Association can then arrange for the infant to be adopted.

Social worker Ramzan Chhipa is the first legal guardian until after a married childless couple is handed the infant for adoption. Chhipa Welfare Association maintains the complete record and the legality of all such unwanted children that are placed in Chhipa Jhoola. After the married childless couple has been selected, the child is then handed over to them in a simple adoption ceremony at the Chhipa Head Office. After that social worker Ramzan Chhipa regularly visits the homes of the adopting parents and monitors the well-being and upbringing of the adopted child.

=== Chhipa Dastarkhwan ===
The organization has established the advanced Chhipa Kitchen, which features a fully automatic bread-baking plant operating 24/7.

=== Sacrificial animals ===
The ambulance centers also accept animals that have been sacrificed on the occasion of a child's birth (Aqiqah) or as other forms of voluntary charity (Sadaqah). These sacrifices are prepared as food for people with low-income.

=== Home and orphanage ===
This welfare association provides the free home & orphanage.

- Chhipa Home for Newborn
- Chhipa Orphanage
- Chhipa Old Home
- Chhipa Women Shelter
