= Militant career of Osama bin Laden =

Osama bin Laden was a militant Islamist and the co-founder of al-Qaeda, in conjunction with several other Islamic militant leaders, issued two fatawa – in 1996 and then again in 1998 – that military personnel from the United States and allied countries until they withdraw support for Israel and withdraw military forces from Islamic countries. He was indicted in United States federal court for his alleged involvement in the 1998 U.S. embassy bombings in Dar es Salaam, Tanzania and Nairobi, Kenya, and was on the U.S. Federal Bureau of Investigation's Ten Most Wanted Fugitives list until his death.

Bin Laden was never indicted for the September 11, 2001 attacks, despite claiming responsibility for them in videos released to the public.

== Jihad in Afghanistan ==
Bin Laden's wealth and connections assisted his interest in supporting the mujahideen, Muslim guerrillas fighting the Soviet Union in Afghanistan following the Soviet invasion of Afghanistan in 1979. His old teacher from the university in Jeddah, Abdullah Azzam, had relocated to Peshawar, a major border city in the North-West Frontier Province of Pakistan. From there, Azzam was able to organize resistance directly on the Afghan frontier. Peshawar is only 15 kilometres (9.3 miles) east of the Khyber Pass, through the Safed Koh mountains, connected to the southeastern edge of the Hindu Kush range. This route became the major avenue of inserting foreign fighters and material support into eastern Afghanistan for the resistance against the Soviets.

After leaving college in 1979, bin Laden joined Azzam to fight the Soviet Invasion, and lived for a time in Peshawar. According to Rahimullah Yousufzai, "Azzam prevailed on him to come and use his money" for training recruits. In the early 1980s, bin Laden lived at several addresses in and around Arbab Road, a narrow street in the University Town neighborhood in western Peshawar, Yusufzai said. Nearby in Gulshan Iqbal Road is the Arab mosque that Abdullah Azzam used as the jihad center, according to a Reuters inquiry in the neighborhood.

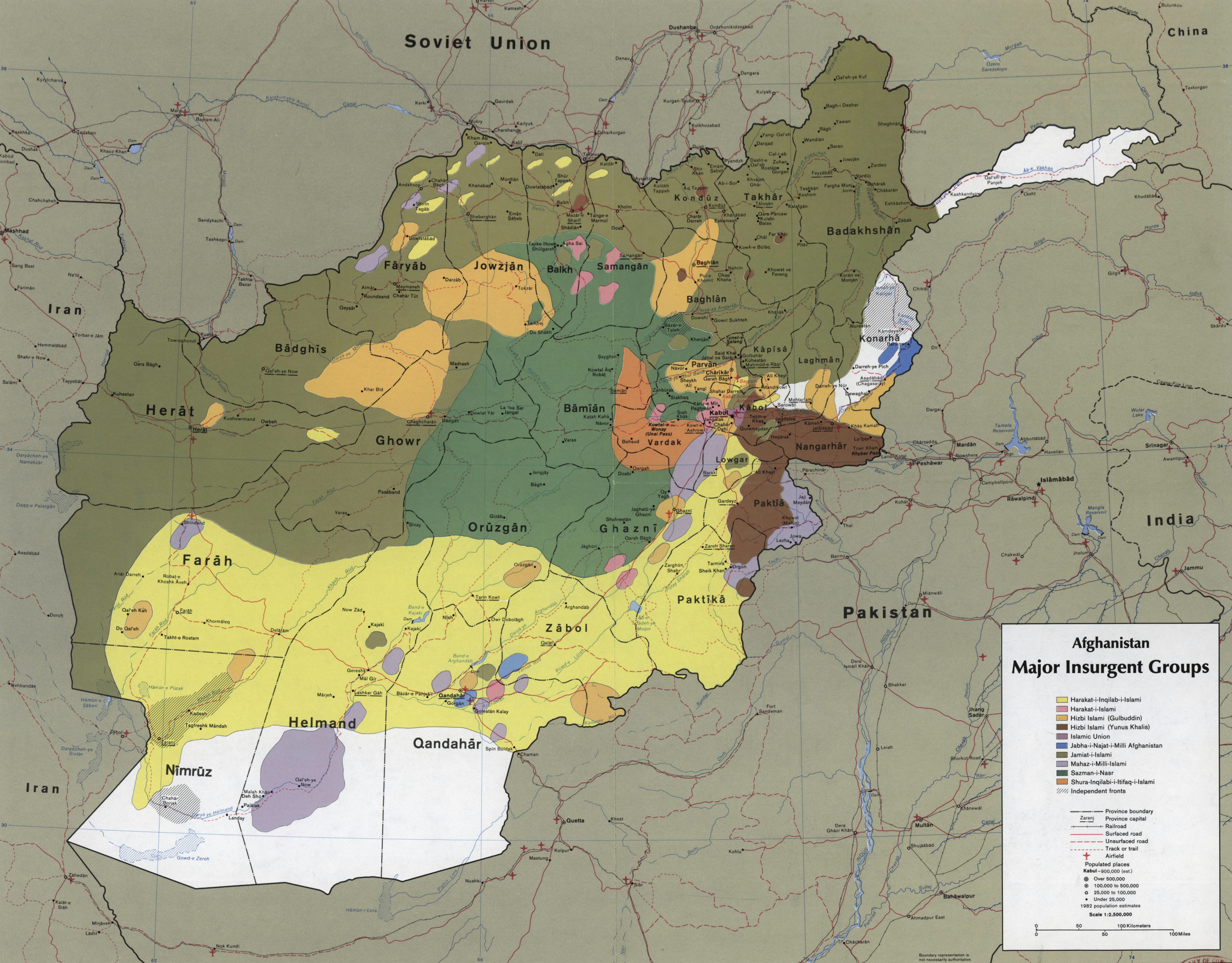
1985 CIA map of major Afghan mujahideen groups' territory

By 1984, with Azzam, bin Laden established a Saudi Arabian funded organization named Maktab al-Khadamat (MAK, Office of Order in English), which funneled money, arms and Muslim fighters from around the Arabic world into the Afghan war. Through al-Khadamat, bin Laden's inherited family fortune, paid for air tickets and accommodation, dealt with paperwork with Pakistani authorities, and provided other such services for the jihad fighters. In running al-Khadamat, bin Laden set up a network of couriers traveling between Afghanistan and Peshawar, which remained active after 2001, according to Rahimullah Yusufzai. It was during this time that Bin Laden met his future al-Qaeda collaborator, Dr. Ayman al-Zawahiri, a member and later head of the Egyptian Islamic Jihad.

== Alleged CIA involvement ==
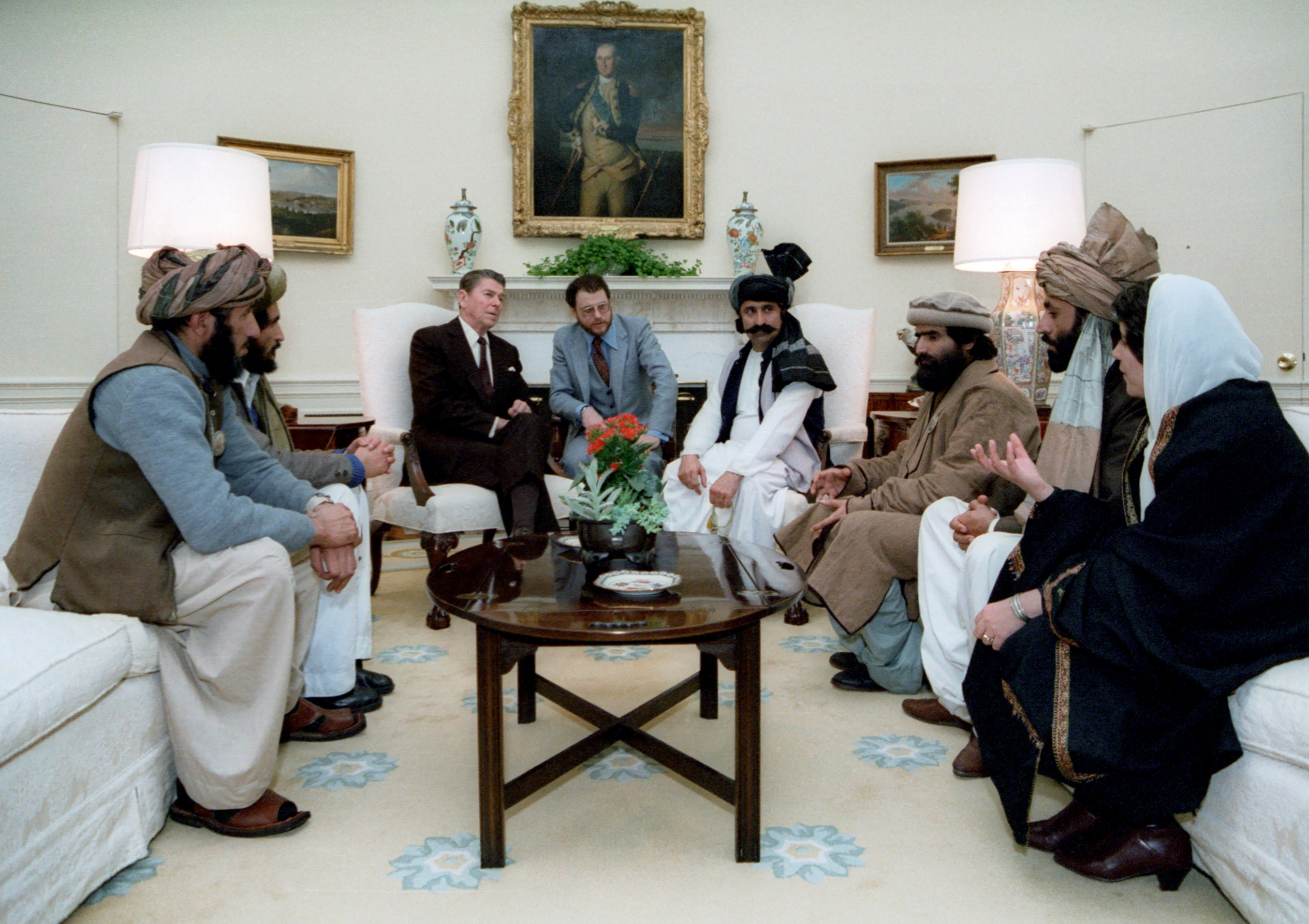
U.S. president Ronald Reagan meeting with Afghan mujahideen leaders in the Oval Office in 1983

Whether bin Laden and his group are "blowback" from CIA's Operation Cyclone to help the Afghan mujahideen is a matter of some debate.

Robin Cook, UK Foreign Secretary from 1997 to 2001 and Leader of the House of Commons from 2001 to 2003, has written that bin Laden was, "a product of a monumental miscalculation by western security agencies" and that the mujahideen that formed al-Qaeda were "originally ... recruited and trained with help from the CIA".

However, CNN journalist Peter Bergen, known for conducting the first television interview with bin Laden in 1997, calls the idea "that the CIA funded bin Laden or trained bin Laden ... a folk myth. There's no evidence of this. ... Bin Laden had his own money, he was anti-American and he was operating secretly and independently. ... The real story here is the CIA didn't really have a clue about who this guy was until 1996 when they set up a unit to really start tracking him."

== Break with Azzam ==
Bin Laden was recruited to be part of Azzam's Maktab al-Khidamat (Services Bureau), the support network of Arab fighters in Pakistan that was helping resist the Soviet occupation of Afghanistan. For a while, bin Laden worked at the Services Bureau working with Abdullah Azzam on Jihad Magazine, a magazine that gave information about the war with the Soviets and interviewed mujahideen. Although bin Laden and the other Afghan Arabs were considered a minor "sideshow" in the war, bin Laden did establish a camp in Afghanistan and, with other volunteers, fought the Soviets and Marxist Afghan troops. One of his most significant battles was the Battle of Jaji, which was not a major fight, but it earned him a reputation as a fighter.

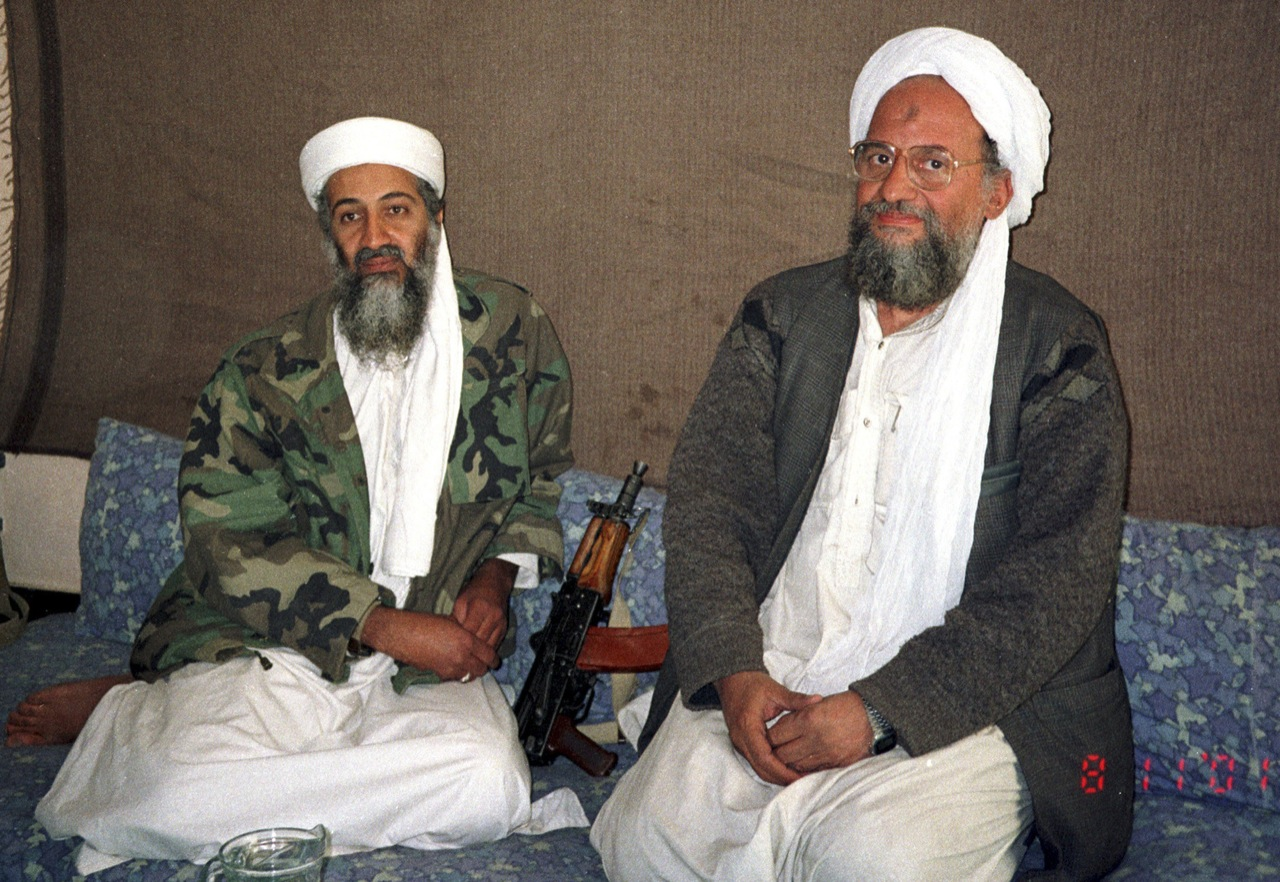
Bin Laden and Ayman al-Zawahiri in Kabul, Afghanistan, in November 2001

As time passed, Ayman al-Zawahiri encouraged bin Laden to split away from Abdullah Azzam. This stemmed from al-Zawahiri's differences with Azzam such as their conflicting interpretations of the jihad. Some believe that al-Zawahiri's motive was driven by his desire to exploit bin Laden's finances as well as the ambition to control the fractured Egyptian jihadist movement and so al-Zawahiri favored an aggressive view. On the other hand, Azzam pushed for a limited and defensive conception of jihad, where it becomes obligatory only when the enemy enters the land of Muslims. This doctrine, however, proved ambiguous and invited several interpretations. Bin Laden began gravitating towards Zawahiri's position as he pursued a more expansive warfare strategy that allowed "insurrections against apostate Muslim regimes." Azzam rejected this because he eschewed intra-Muslim conflict and the dispute finally led to a power struggle, which bin Laden won. By 1988, he finally broke away from his mentor, establishing al-Qaeda with the most extremist of the Muslim militants from Azzam's network and began a radical form of jihad that pursued the violent overthrow of governments in the Muslim world deemed apostate.

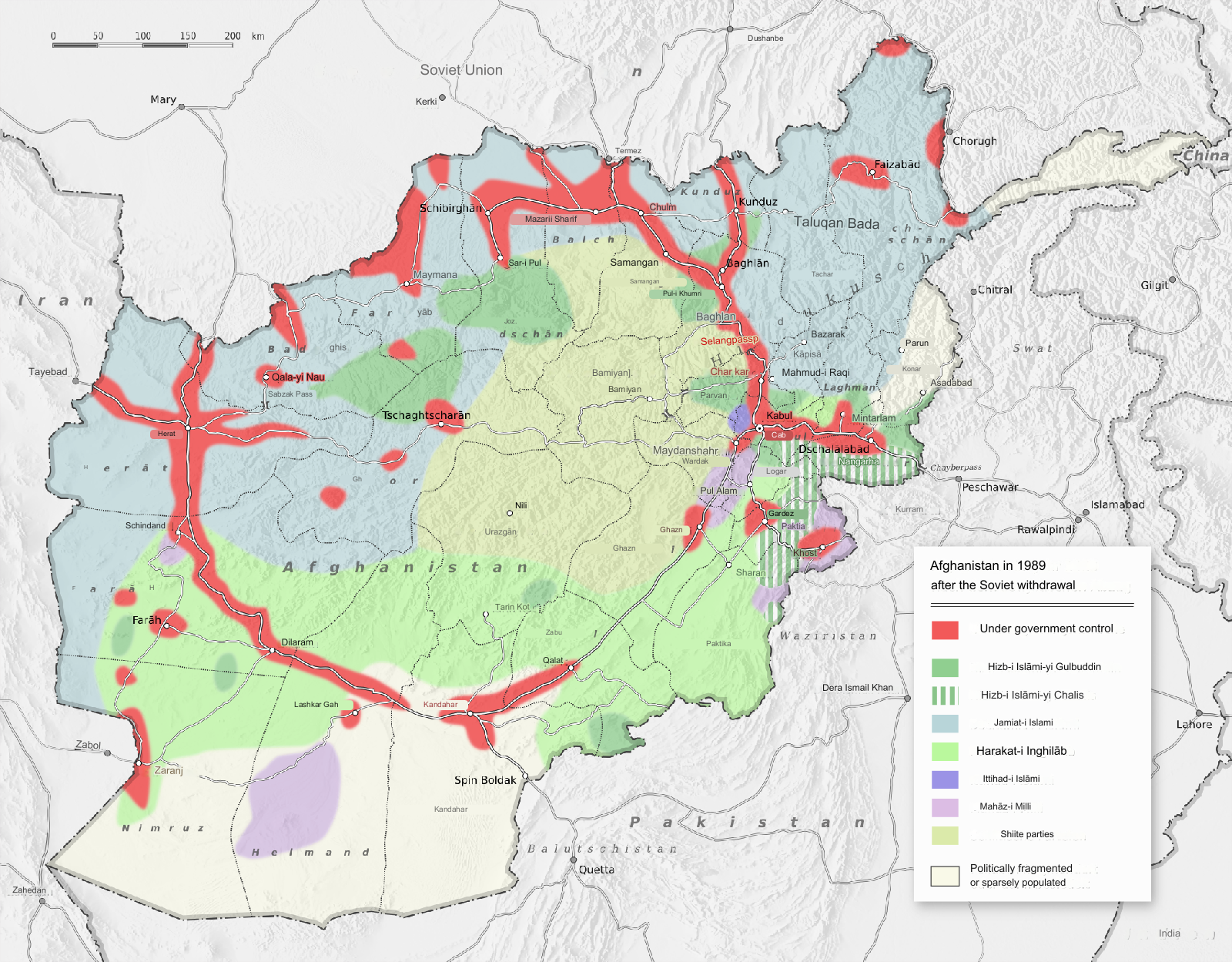
Political situation in Afghanistan in 1989, following the Soviet withdrawal

Years later, in 1989, Azzam was blown up in a massive car bombing outside the mosque. Bin Laden is thought by some to be behind the assassination due to the rift about the direction of the jihad at that time. Others, however, doubt this claim; Ahmad Zaidan, for instance, author of the Arabic-language book Bin Laden Unmasked, told Peter L. Bergen in an interview, "I rule out totally that bin Laden would indulge himself in such things, after all, Osama bin Laden, he's not type of person to kill Abdullah Azzam. Otherwise, if he be exposed, he would be finished, totally." Bergen also cites Saudi journalist Jamal Khashoggi, who speculates that there were more likely candidates than bin Laden: "It could be Hekmatyar, it could be KHAD, it could be the Mossad, the Egyptians [around Ayman al Zawahiri] ... I met with Hekmatyar, an arrogant, self-centered person. I think Hekmatyar had a secret organization to eliminate his enemies."

== Founding of al-Qaeda ==
The jihadist flag, used by al-Qaeda and many of its affiliates

By 1988, bin Laden had split from Maktab al-Khidamat because of strategic differences. While Azzam and his MAK organization acted as support for the Afghan fighters and provided relief to refugees and injured, bin Laden wanted a more military role in which the Arab fighters would not only be trained and equipped by the organization but also led on the battlefield by Arabic commanders. One of the main leading points to the split and the creation of al-Qaeda was the insistence of Azzam that Arab fighters be integrated among the Afghan fighting groups instead of forming their separate fighting force.

In 1990, bin Laden returned to Saudi Arabia a hero of jihad, celebrated in the Saudi press as a pious, courageous warrior who, along with his Arab legion, "had brought down the mighty superpower" of the Soviet Union. However, at about the same time Iraq invaded neighbor Kuwait and bin Laden was alarmed at the prospect that foreign non-Muslim troops would enter the kingdom to fight Iraq. He met Saudi Prince Sultan, the Minister of Defense, and offered to help defend Saudi Arabia:

Bin Laden: I am ready to prepare 100,000 fighters with good combat capability within three months. You don't need Americans. You don't need any other non-Muslim troops. We will be enough.

Prince Sultan: There are no caves in Kuwait. What will you do when he lobs missiles at you with chemical and biological weapons?

Bin Laden: We will fight him with faith.

Bin Laden was rebuffed and publicly denounced Saudi Arabia's dependence on the U.S. military, demanding an end to the presence of foreign military bases in the country. Other Saudi Muslims were also greatly upset that non-Muslim troops would be on the same peninsula as the two holy cities of Mecca and Medina. Anti-government Islamist militants in Saudi Arabia were even more inflamed when the foreign bases remained after the Gulf War was over.

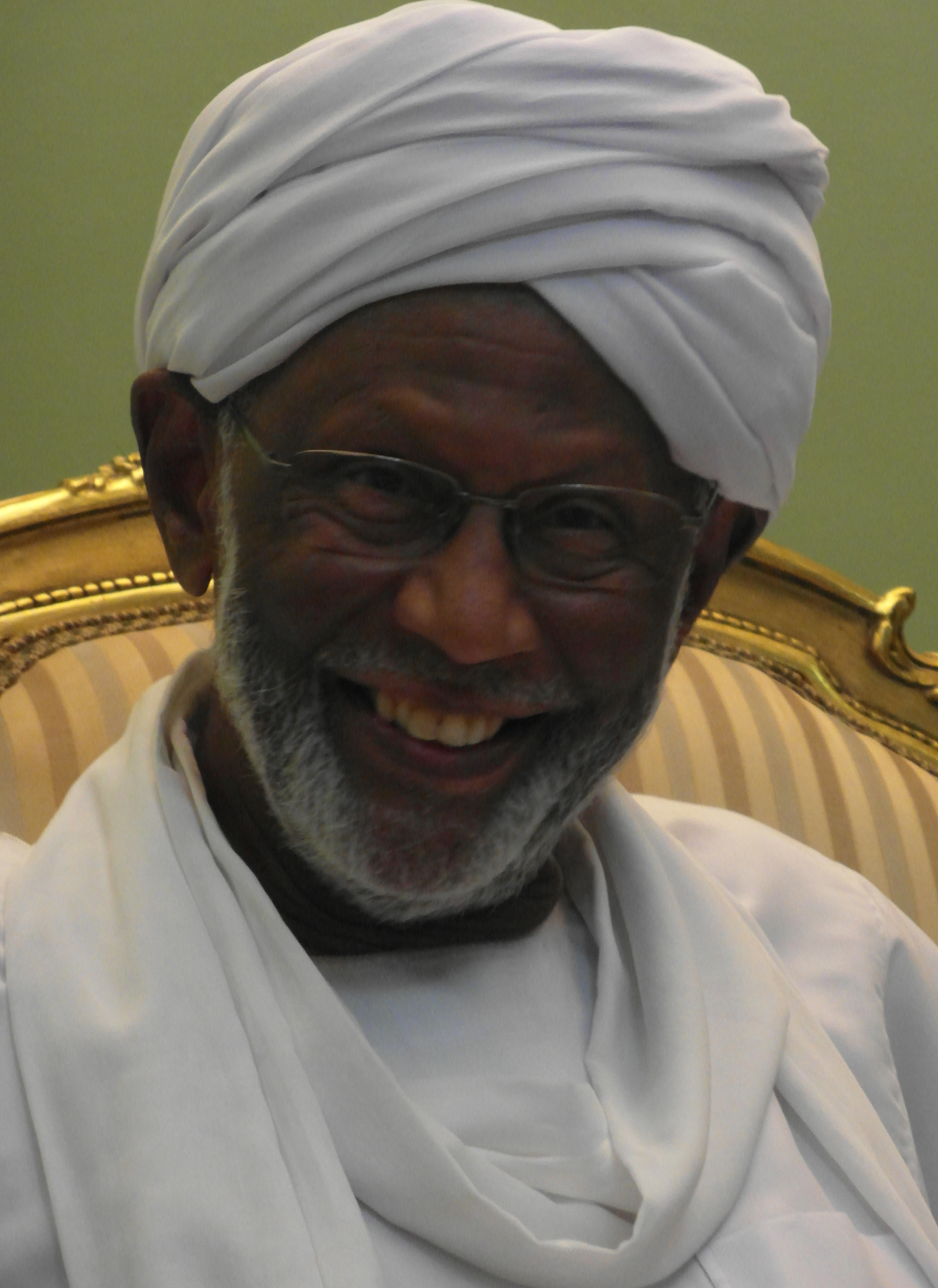
Hassan al-Turabi in 2015

Bin Laden's increasingly strident criticisms of the Saudi monarchy led the government to attempt to silence him. According to the 9/11 Commission Report, "with help from a dissident member of the royal family, he managed to get out of the country under the pretext of attending an Islamic gathering in Pakistan in April 1991." Another report has bin Laden retrieving his passport from the Saudi government to go to Peshawar in March 1992 to mediate the Afghan Civil War. In any case Hassan al-Turabi, leader of the National Islamic Front, had invited bin Laden to "transplant his whole organization to Sudan" in 1989. Bin Laden's agents had begun purchasing property in Sudan in 1990. Bin Laden moved to Sudan in 1992.

== Yugoslav wars (1991–1999) ==
One of the former State Department officials described Bosnia and Herzegovina of the time as a safe haven for terrorists, after it was revealed that militant elements of the former Sarajevo government were protecting extremists include hard-core terrorists, some with ties to bin Laden. In 1997, Rzeczpospolita, one of the largest Polish daily newspapers, reported that intelligence services of the Nordic-Polish SFOR Brigade suspected that a center for training terrorists from Islamic countries was located in the Bocina Donja village near Maglaj in Bosnia and Herzegovina. In 1992, thousands of volunteers joined an "all-mujahedeen unit" called El Moujahed, which was headquartered in Zenica in an abandoned hillside factory, a compound with a hospital and prayer hall. According to Middle East intelligence reports. Bin Laden financed small convoys of recruits from the Arab world through his businesses in Sudan. Among them was Karim Said Atmani who was identified by authorities as the document forger for a group of Algerians accused of plotting the bombings in the US. He is a former roommate of Ahmed Ressam, the man arrested at the Canadian–U.S. border in mid-December 1999 with a car full of nitroglycerin and bomb-making materials. He was convicted of colluding with bin Laden by a French court. A Bosnian government search of passport and residency records, conducted at the urging of the United States, revealed other former mujahideen who are linked to the same Algerian group or to other suspected terrorist groups and who have lived in this area 60 miles north of Sarajevo, the capital, in the past few years. Khalil al-Deek, was arrested in Jordan in late December 1999 on suspicion of involvement in a plot to blow up tourist sites; a second man with Bosnian citizenship, Hamid Aich, lived in Canada at the same time as Atmani and worked for a charity associated with bin Laden. In its 26 June 1997 Report on the bombing of the Al Khobar building in Riyadh, Saudi Arabia, The New York Times noted that those arrested confessed to serving with Bosnian Muslims forces. Further, the terrorists also admitted to ties with bin Laden. In 1999 it was revealed that bin Laden and his Tunisian assistant Mehrez Aodouni were granted citizenship and Bosnian passport in 1993 by the Government in Sarajevo. This information was denied by Bosnian government following the 9/11 attacks but it was later found out that Aodouni was arrested in Turkey and that at that time he possessed the Bosnian passport. Following this revelation new explanation was given that bin Laden "did not personally collect his Bosnian passport" and that officials at the Bosnian embassy in Vienna, which issued the passport, could not have known who bin Laden was at the time.

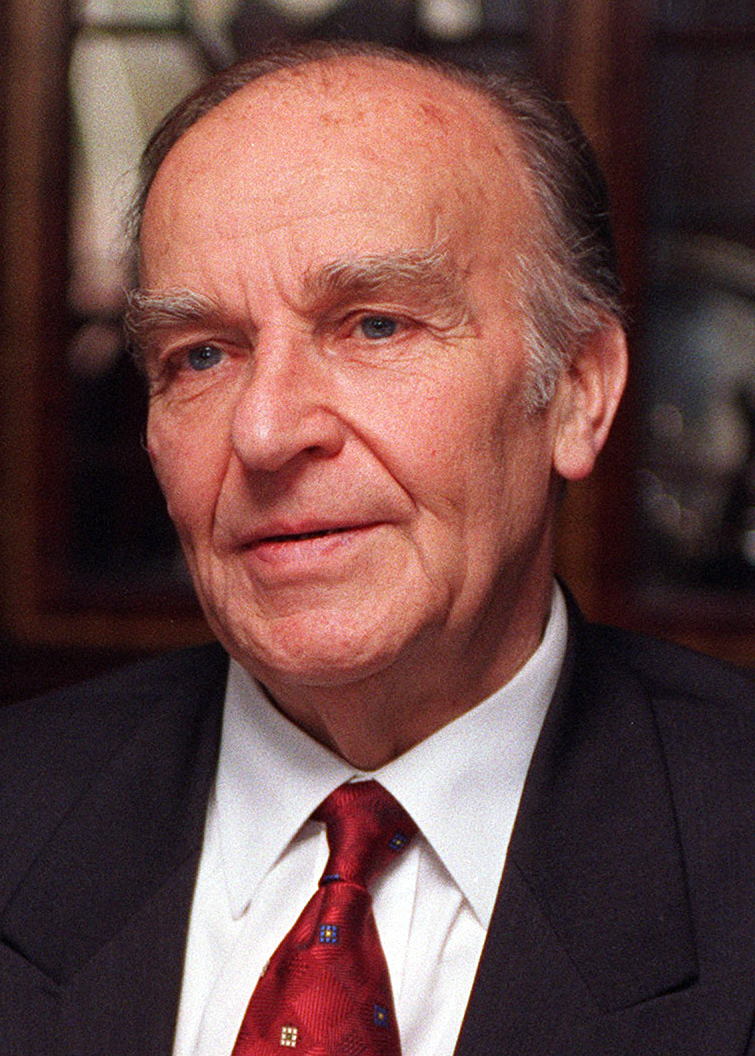
Alija Izetbegović

According to several sources, Bosnian president Alija Izetbegović reportedly met with bin Laden in the former's office in Sarajevo during the Bosnian War. In 1998 it was reported that bin Laden was operating his terrorist network out of Albania. The Charleston Gazette quoted Fatos Klosi, the head of the Albanian intelligence service, as saying a network run by bin Laden sent units to fight in the Serbian province of Kosovo. Confirmation of these activities came from Claude Kader, a French national who said he was a member of bin Laden's Albanian network. He claimed he had visited Albania to recruit and arm fighters for Kosovo. In 2000, bin Laden was operating from Kosovo planning the terrorist activities during the Insurgency in the Preševo Valley.

Connections between bin Laden and National Liberation Army, a guerrilla organization that operated in the Republic of Macedonia in 2001 were also drawn. The NLA was fighting to keep control over the region's drug trafficking, which had grown into a large, lucrative enterprise since the Kosovo War and that in addition to drug money, the NLA also had another prominent venture capitalist, bin Laden. According to a document written by the chief commander of the Macedonian Security Forces, bin Laden was financing the rebel group through a representative in Macedonia. Bin Laden paid $6 to $7 million for the needs of the National Liberation Army through his representative. Bin Laden was planning to gain control over Macedonia so that he could control the distribution of oil to the United States through the pipeline that was planned to stretch from Bulgaria to Albania ports.

== In Sudan ==
Assisted by donations funneled through business and charitable fronts such as Benevolence International, established by his brother-in-law, Mohammed Jamal Khalifa, and especially by his stipend from the bin Laden family business empire, Osama established a new base for mujahideen operations in Khartoum, Sudan to disseminate Islamist philosophy and recruit operatives in Southeast Asia, Africa, Europe, and the United States. Bin Laden also invested in business ventures, such as al-Hajira, a construction company that built roads throughout Sudan, and Wadi al-Aqiq, an agricultural corporation that farmed hundreds of thousands of acres of sorghum, gum Arabic, sesame and sunflowers in Sudan's central Gezira province. Bin Laden's operations in Sudan were protected by the powerful Sudanese NIF government figure Hassan al Turabi, but were not profitable. While in Sudan, bin Laden married one of Turabi's nieces.

Bin Laden continued his verbal assault on Saudi King Fahd, for example by financing an Advice and Reformation Committee in London that "sent faxes by the hundreds to prominent Saudis" denouncing the king and corruption in the kingdom. On 5 March 1994, the King retaliated by personally revoking his citizenship and sending an embassary to Sudan to demand bin Laden's passport so that he no longer travel. His family was persuaded to cut off his monthly stipend equivalent of about $7 million a year.

By this point, bin Laden was strongly associated with Egyptian Islamic Jihad (EIJ) who made up the core of al-Qaeda by this time. In 1995, EIJ attempted to assassinate Egyptian president Hosni Mubarak with the help of al-Gama'a al-Islamiyya and the Sudanese intelligence service. The attempt failed and disastrous backlash ensued. The EIJ was abruptly expelled from Sudan and bin Laden pressured to go as well. He took a chartered flight to Jalalabad, Afghanistan and began building a network of contacts.

== Refuge in Afghanistan ==
Sudanese officials, whose government was under international sanctions, offered to expel bin Laden to Saudi Arabia in the mid-1990s provided that the Saudis pardon him. The Saudis refused because they had already revoked his citizenship and would not accept him in their country. Consequently, in May 1996, under increasing pressure from Saudi Arabia, Egypt and the United States, Sudan asked bin Laden to leave. Bin Laden was forced to make a distress sale of his assets in Sudan that left with almost nothing.

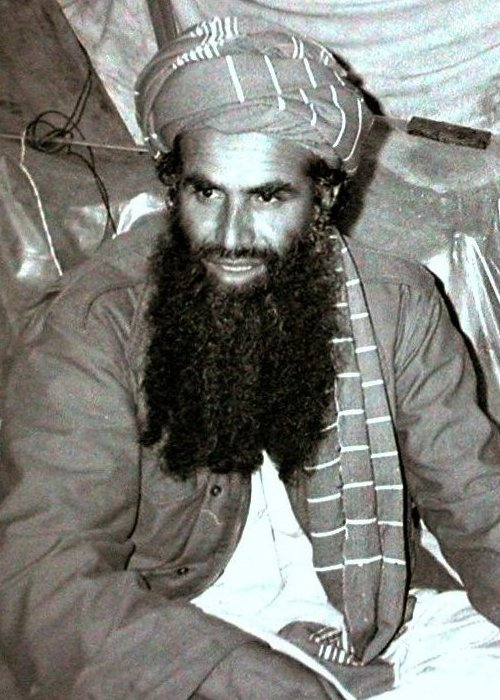
Abdul Rasul Sayyaf in 1984

He returned to Afghanistan on a chartered plane and flew to Kabul before settling in the Nazim Jihad compound in Jalalabad after being invited by Abdul Rasul Sayyaf, leader of the Islamic Union for the Liberation of Afghanistan, a member of the Afghan Northern Alliance. After spending a few months with these three leaders in the border region hosted by them, bin Laden forged a close relationship with selected leaders of Afghanistan's new Taliban government, notably Mullah Mohammed Omar. Bin Laden supported the Taliban regime with financial and paramilitary assistance and, in 1997, he moved to Kandahar, the Taliban stronghold.

In Afghanistan, bin Laden and al-Qaeda were able to raise some money from "donors from the days of the Soviet jihad," and from the Pakistan ISI which paid them to train militants for the fight against India in Kashmir. This was done at the old al-Qaeda camps in Khost which the ISI had persuaded the Taliban to return to al-Qaeda control.

== Early aid for attacks ==
Several years before bin Laden was well known outside of Saudi and Islamist circles, he assisted and/or funded what he believed to be physical jihad against impiety involving attacks on civilians.

While still in Saudi Arabia in 1989, he angered the Saudi royal family by preaching for and financing assassinations of socialist leaders in the neighboring country of Yemen, his father's homeland, where the country was in the process of re-uniting under a coalition government.

In 1992 or 1993, bin Laden sent an emissary, Qari el-Said, with $40,000 to Algeria to aid the Islamists there and warn them against compromise with the impious government. Making jihad merely "for politics, not for God" would be a sin, they were told; total war was the only solution. Total war did follow involving many massacres of civilians and a declaration of takfir of Algerians by one of the Islamist factions (the GIA). An estimated 150,000–200,000 Algerians were killed by the end of the war, but the government prevailed over the Islamists. Abdullah Anas, an Algerian Islamist witness to the al-Qaeda advice, later lamented, `This simple argument destroyed us.`

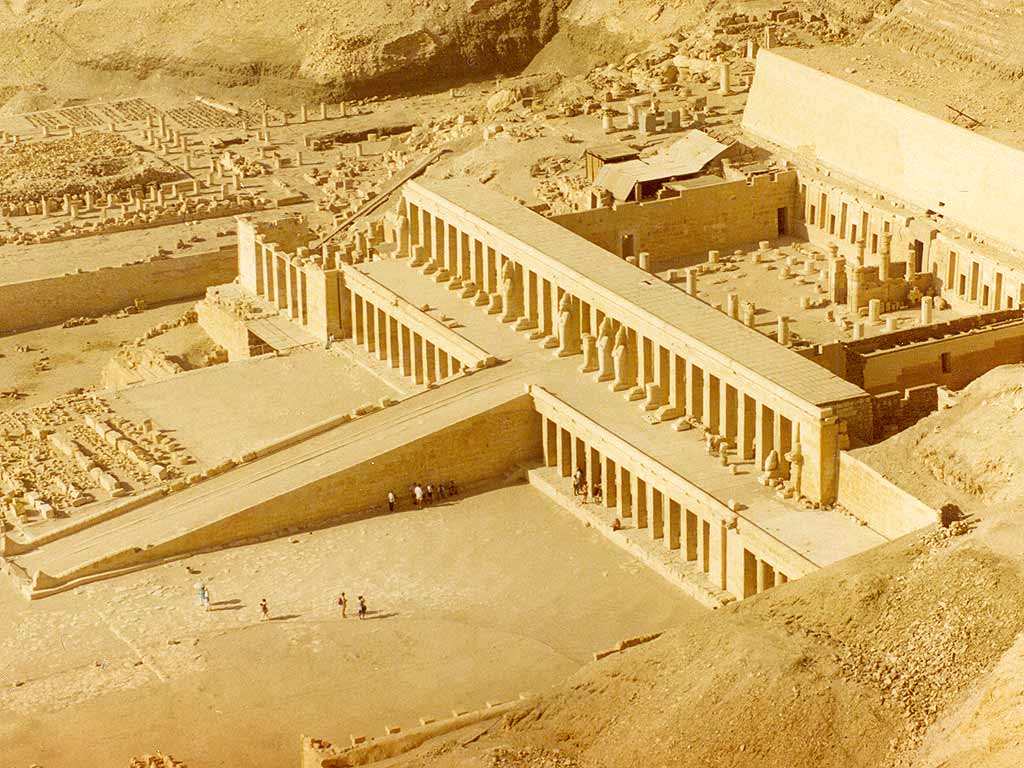
The Mortuary Temple of Hatshepsut, where the 1997 Luxor massacre took place

Another unsuccessful effort by bin Laden was the Luxor massacre of 17 November 1997, which Swiss federal police are reported to have found was funded by bin Laden. The attack by six al-Gama'a al-Islamiyya militants dressed as policemen slaughtered 58 foreign tourists and four Egyptians at Luxor Temple. Its goal was to derail the nonviolence initiative between the Egyptian government and Egyptian-based al-Gama'a al-Islamiyya, the major Egyptian militant Islamist group, but the attack horrified the Egyptian public and turned it completely against Islamist terror.

A later attack that did succeed, at least temporarily, was that on the northern Afghan city of Mazar-e-Sharif. While in Afghanistan, bin Laden helped cement his alliance with his hosts, the ruling Taliban, by sending several hundred of his Afghan Arab fighters along to help the Taliban overrun Mazar-e-Sharif. The city fell, but journalists report it as a particularly gruesome conquest. For two days the Taliban drove their pickup trucks "up and down the narrow streets of Mazar-i-Sharif shooting to the left and right and killing everything that moved – shop owners, cart pullers, women and children shoppers and even goats and donkeys." More than 8,000 noncombatants were reported killed in Mazar-i-Sharif and later in Bamiyan.

== Attacks on United States targets ==
It is believed that the first terrorist attack involving bin Laden was the 29 December 1992 bombing of the Gold Mihor Hotel in Aden, Yemen. The attack was intended to kill American troops on the way to Somalia, but the soldiers were staying in a different hotel. The bombs killed a Yemeni hotel employee and an Austrian national and also seriously injured the Austrian's wife.

It was after this bombing that al-Qaeda was reported to have developed its justificiation for the killing of innocent people, such as the two bystanders at the hotel. According to a fatwa issued by Mamdouh Mahmud Salim (aka, Abu Hajer al Iraqi), the most Islamically knowledgeable of al-Qaeda's members, the killing of someone merely standing near the enemy is justified because any innocent bystander, like the Yemeni hotel worker, will find their proper reward in death, going to Paradise (heaven) if they were good Muslims and to hell if they were bad or non-believers. The fatwa was issued to al-Qaeda members but not the public.

In 1998, bin Laden and Ayman al-Zawahiri, (a leader of Egyptian Islamic Jihad), co-signed a fatwa (religious edict) in the name of the World Islamic Front for Jihad Against Jews and Crusaders, declaring:

[t]he ruling to kill the Americans and their allies civilians and military – is an individual duty for every Muslim who can do it in any country in which it is possible to do it, in order to liberate the al-Aqsa Mosque (in Jerusalem) and the holy mosque (in Makka) from their grip, and in order for their armies to move out of all the lands of Islam, defeated and unable to threaten any Muslim. This is in accordance with the words of Almighty Allah, 'and fight the pagans all together as they fight you all together,' and 'fight them until there is no more tumult or oppression, and there prevail justice and faith in Allah'.

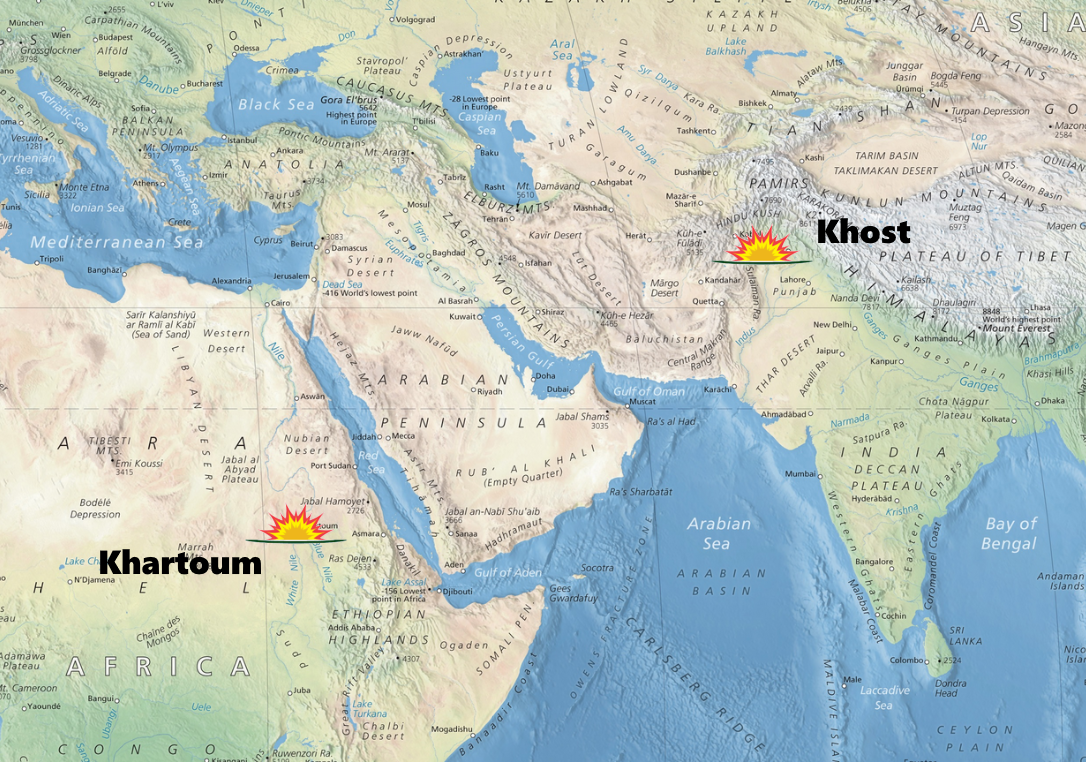
The two locations targeted by the U.S. in Operation Infinite Reach in 1998

In response to the 1998 United States embassy bombings following the fatwa, President Bill Clinton ordered a freeze on assets that could be linked to bin Laden. Clinton also signed an executive order, authorizing bin Laden's arrest or assassination. In August 1998, the U.S. launched an attack using cruise missiles. The attack failed to harm bin Laden but killed 22 people.

On 4 November 1998, bin Laden was indicted by a Federal Grand Jury, and the United States Department of State offered a US$5 million reward for information leading to bin Laden's apprehension or conviction.

In an interview with journalist Rahimullah Yusufzai published in Time magazine, 11 January 1999, bin Laden said:

"The International Islamic Front for Jihad against the U.S. and Israel has issued a crystal-clear fatwa calling on the Islamic nation to carry on jihad aimed at liberating holy sites. The nation of Muhammad has responded to this appeal. If the instigation for jihad against the Jews and the Americans in order to liberate Al-Aksa Mosque and the Holy Ka'aba Islamic shrines in the Middle East is considered a crime, then let history be a witness that I am a criminal."

Following the 2000 USS Cole bombing, Mohammed Atef was moved to Kandahar, Zawahiri to Kabul, and Bin Laden fled to Kabul, later joining Atef when he realized no American reprisal attacks were forthcoming.

== 11 September attacks ==
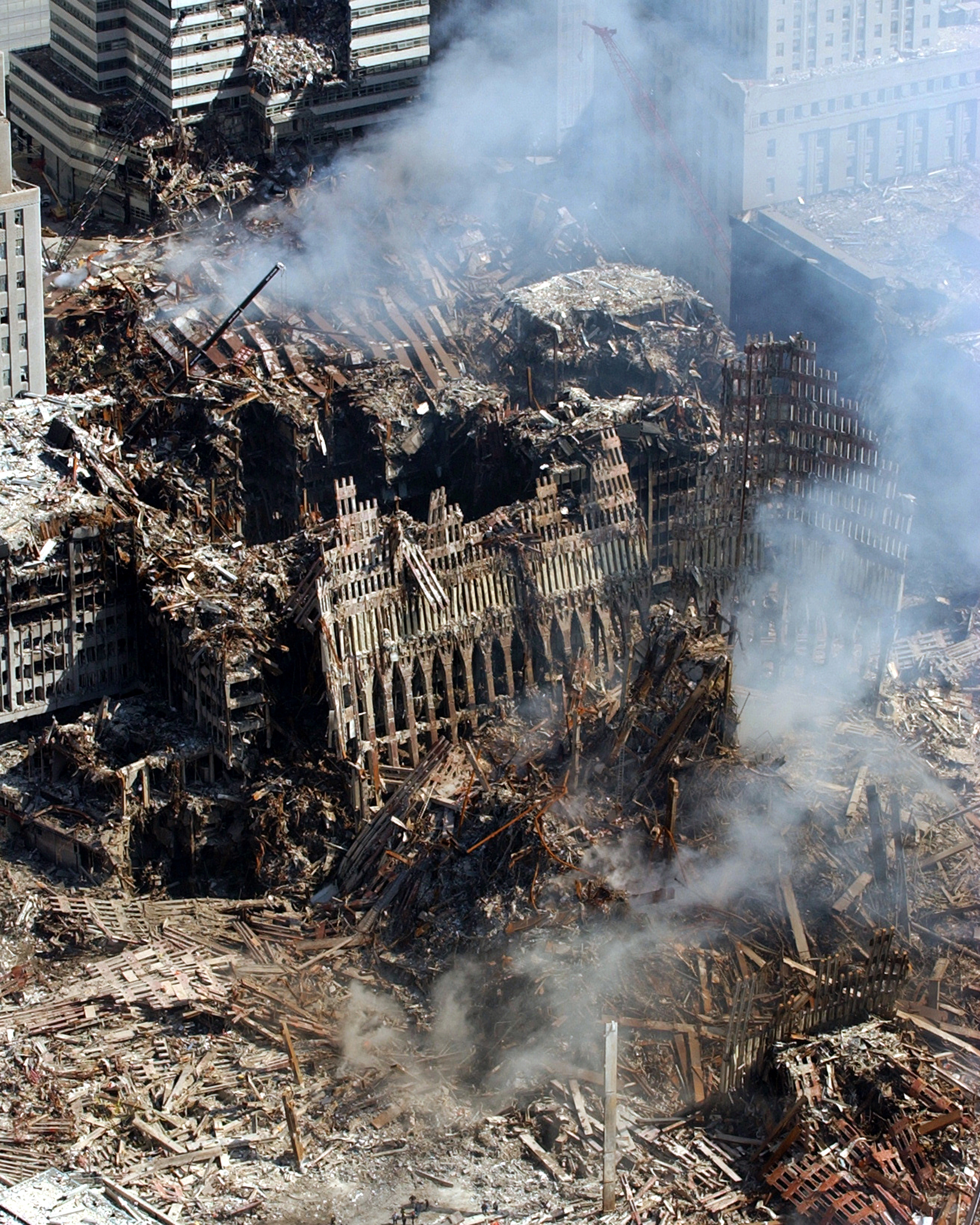
Aftermath of the 11 September attacks in 2001

The Government of the United Kingdom stated that evidence linking al-Qaeda and bin Laden to the attacks of 11 September is clear and irrefutable. However, a "White Paper" by the U.S. government, documenting the case against bin Laden and the Al Qaeda organization concerning the 11 September attacks, publicly promised by Secretary of State Colin Powell, was never published. So far, the U.S. Justice Department has not sought formal criminal charges against bin Laden (or anyone but Zacarias Moussaoui) for the 9/11 attacks. This has provided what some call "fodder for conspiracy theorists who think the U.S. government or another power was behind the Sept. 11 hijackings." Two separate indictments were made against bin Laden by two separate grand juries in 1998 for two separate terrorist acts, though no indictments have been filed against him for the events of 9/11.

Bin Laden initially denied involvement in the September 11, 2001 attacks while praising them effusely, explaining their motivation, and dismissing American accusations of his involvement as an example of its hatred for Islam. On 16 September 2001, bin Laden read a statement later broadcast by Qatar's Al Jazeera satellite channel saying:

I stress that I have not carried out this act, which appears to have been carried out by individuals with their own motivation.

God has struck America at its Achilles heel and destroyed its greatest buildings, praise and blessing to Him.

Bin Laden claimed the Taliban were being attacked by American forces "because of their religion, not just because of the presence of Osama bin Laden ... It is a known fact that America is against the establishment of any Islamic state."

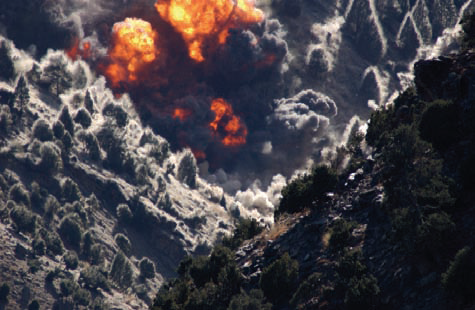
U.S. air strikes on Tora Bora during the Battle of Tora Bora from November to December 2001

In early November 2001, the Taliban government announced they were bestowing official Afghan citizenship on him, as well as Zawahiri, Mohammed Atef, and Shaykh Asim Abdulrahman.

Also in November, U.S. forces recovered a videotape from a destroyed house in Jalalabad, Afghanistan. In it, bin Laden discusses the attack with an old mujahideen friend Khaled al-Harbi in a way indicating foreknowledge of the attack. "We calculated in advance the number of casualties from the enemy;" and "We had notification since the previous Thursday that the event [the 9/11 attack] would take place that day." The tape was broadcast on various news networks on 13 December 2001. Some have disputed this translation however. On 20 December 2001, German TV channel "Das Erste" broadcast its analysis of the White House's translation of the videotape. On the show Monitor, two independent translators and an expert on oriental studies found the White House's translation to be not only inaccurate, but also "manipulative". Arabist Dr. Abdel El M. Husseini, one of the translators, stated: "I have carefully examined the Pentagon's translation. This translation is very problematic. At the most important places where it is held to prove the guilt of bin Laden, it is not identical with the Arabic."

Another bin Laden video was released on 27 December 2001, with much the same message as his first. America had accused him of organizing the attacks because of "Crusader hatred for the Islamic World."

Terrorism against America deserves to be praised because it was a response to ... the continuous injustice inflicted upon our sons in Palestine, Iraq, Somalia, southern Sudan, and ... Kashmir.

Shortly before the U.S. presidential election in 2004, another taped statement was released and aired on Al Jazeera in which bin Laden abandoned his denials without retracting past statements. In it he told viewers he had personally directed the 19 hijackers, and gave what he claimed was his motivation:

I will explain to you the reasons behind these events, and I will tell you the truth about the moments when this decision was taken, so that you can reflect on it. God knows that the plan of striking the towers had not occurred to us, but the idea came to me when things went just too far with the American-Israeli alliance's oppression and atrocities against our people in Palestine and Lebanon.

According to the tapes, bin Laden claimed he was inspired to destroy the World Trade Center after watching the destruction of towers in Lebanon by Israel during the 1982 Lebanon War.

In two other tapes aired by Al Jazeera in 2006, bin Laden announced:

I am the one in charge of the 19 brothers ... I was responsible for entrusting the 19 brothers ... with the raids. [5-minute audiotape broadcast May 23, 2006]

and is seen with Ramzi bin al-Shibh, as well as two of the 9/11 hijackers, Hamza al-Ghamdi and Wail al-Shehri, as they make preparations for the attacks (videotape broadcast 7 September 2006).

Despite this, bin Laden is reported to have complained as recently as November 2007 of the lack "of evidence admissible in court" tying him and his organization to the 9/11 attack.
