= Rahmatullah Najib =

Afghan Deputy Director of Intelligence since 2021

Mullah Rahmatullah Najib رحمت الله نجیب

Deputy Director of Intelligence
- Incumbent
- Assumed office 7 September 2021 Serving with Taj Mir Jawad
- Prime Minister: Mohammad Hassan Akhund
- Supreme Leader: Hibatullah Akhundzada

Governor of Balkh
- In office c. 1996 – c. 2000
- Leader: Mohammed Omar
- Prime Minister: Mohammed Rabbani; Abdul Kabir
- Succeeded by: Norullah Noori

Personal details
- Party: Taliban
- Occupation: Politician, Taliban member

Mullah Rahmatullah Najib (Pashto: رحمت‌الله نجيب [rahmatʊˈlɑ naˈd͡ʒɪb]) is the Deputy Director of Intelligence of the Islamic Emirate of Afghanistan since 7 September 2021, alongside Taj Mir Jawad.

== Career ==
Prior to his promotion to the cabinet, Najib served as a field commander.

In June 2016, Najib was reported to be the Taliban's shadow governor for Logar Province and to have been subjected to false claims of killing by Afghan forces.

On 7 September 2021, Najib was made Deputy Director of Intelligence of the Islamic Emirate of Afghanistan, alongside Taj Mir Jawad, under Director of Intelligence Abdul Haq Wasiq.
