= Hotel Inter-Continental Kabul =

Five stars hotel in Kabul, Afghanistan

Intercontinental Hotel Kabul
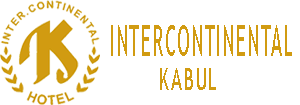

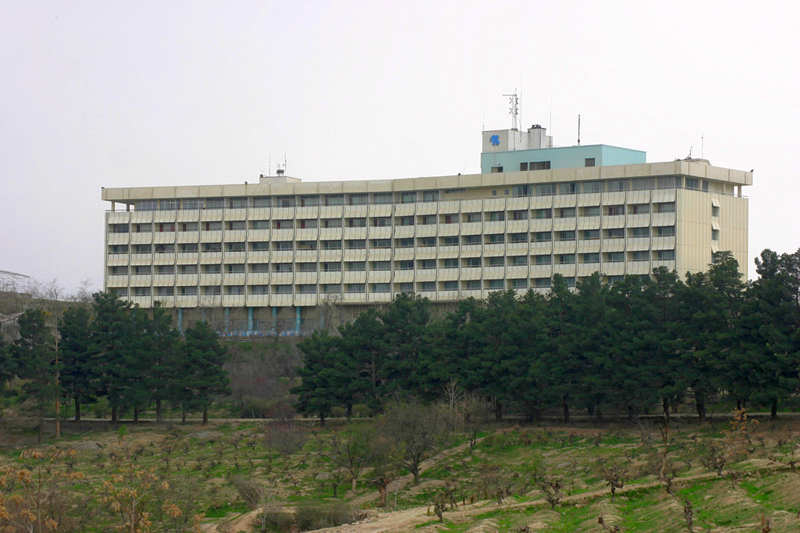

General information
- Location: District 4, Kabul, Afghanistan
- Coordinates: 34°32′13″N 69°07′31″E
- Opening: 9 September 1969

Other information
- Number of rooms: 200
- Number of restaurants: 4

Website
- www.intercontinentalkabul.com

The Intercontinental Hotel Kabul is one of the five-star hotels in Kabul, Afghanistan. It is located on a hill near the historic Bagh-e Bala Palace in the Karte Parwan neighborhood of the city. It served as the nation's first international luxury hotel, one of the most visited by foreigners since its opening in 1969. The hotel has 200 rooms and is equipped with a swimming pool, a gym, and about four restaurants for dine in or room service.

The hotel has not been affiliated with InterContinental Hotels since 1980. It was the site of a deadly militant attack in 2011 and again in 2018.

== History ==
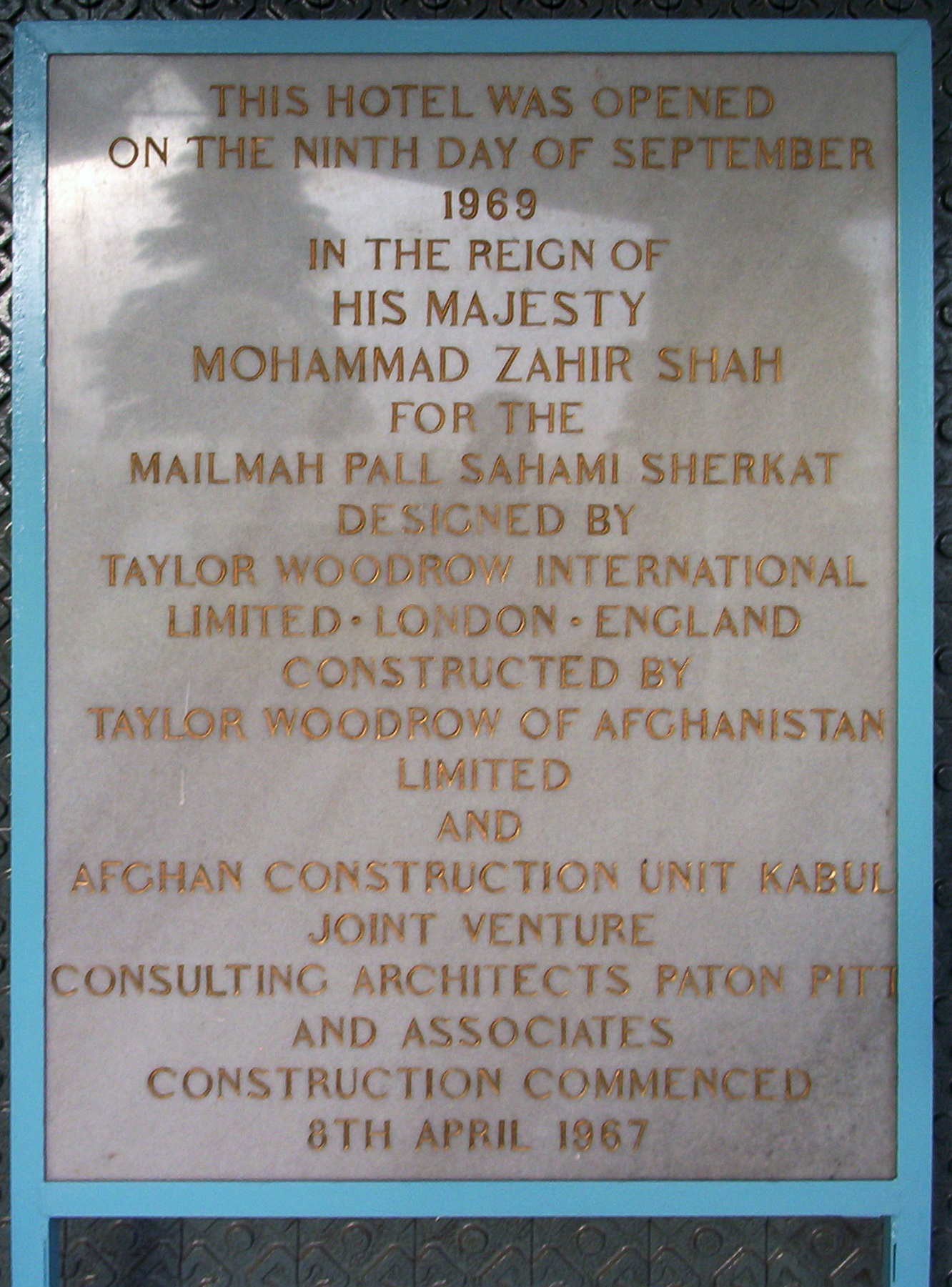
The inaugural plaque of the hotel

Construction of the Hotel Inter-Continental Kabul started in April 1967, and it opened on 9 September 1969. It was developed by the InterContinental Hotels division of Pan Am and built by UK-based Taylor Woodrow.

The hotel has had no association with InterContinental Hotels since 1980, following the Soviet intervention in Afghanistan. Despite this, it continues to use the name and logo without connection to the parent company. The Inter-Continental Hotel Kabul is currently owned by the Bakhshisade family.

During the 1990s civil war, it was damaged during street warfare by militiamen. In 1996, only 85 of the hotel's 200 rooms were habitable due to damage from rockets and shells. It was extensively used by Western journalists during the U.S. invasion of Afghanistan in 2001, as it was the only large hotel still operating in the capital at the time.

In 2003, the hotel pool had no water and the gym was missing all of its furniture. The hotel had several power cuts per day. There were still bullet holes throughout the building, including the windows of the restaurant on the first floor. The furniture in the rooms was simple but clean. In February 2003, a British intelligence agent named Colin Berry, who had been involved in the recovery of surface-to-air missiles and other covert operations, was involved in a gun battle in the hotel. As a result, two Afghans were killed.

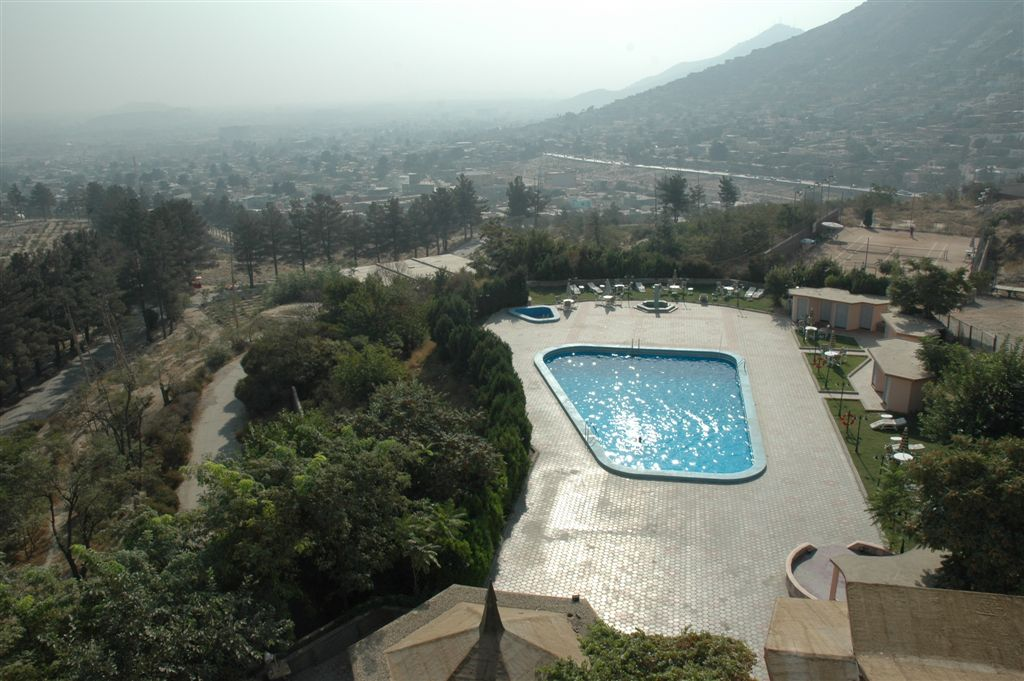
A view from the hotel with the pool, 2005

The hotel went through a $25 million renovation by a Dubai-based company. It is the landmark used at the start of the Hash House Harriers weekly events. The rooms are decorated according to international standards, equipped with air conditioners, heaters, TV, mini-bar, phone, and radio. English, German, and French TV channels are also available. It has an internet cafe located in the basement. The telephone system is still operated by its original manual switchboard, which was manufactured by Siemens.

From 2005 to 2007, the top-floor presidential suite was converted and used as office space by the Senlis Council, a European advocacy group since rebranded as The International Council on Security and Development (ICOS). All Senlis Council expat staff were based in the hotel.

=== 2011 attack ===
On 28 June 2011, an attack by armed suicide bombers and an ensuing five-hour siege left at least 21 people dead, including all nine attackers. Responsibility was claimed by the Taliban.

=== 2018 attack ===
On 20 January 2018, a group of four or five gunmen attacked the hotel, sparking a 12-hour battle. The attack left at least 42 people dead and more than 14 others injured.
