= Riyadh, Khartoum =

Neighbourhood in Sudan

Al-Riyad الرياض
- Neighbourhood
- Riyadh
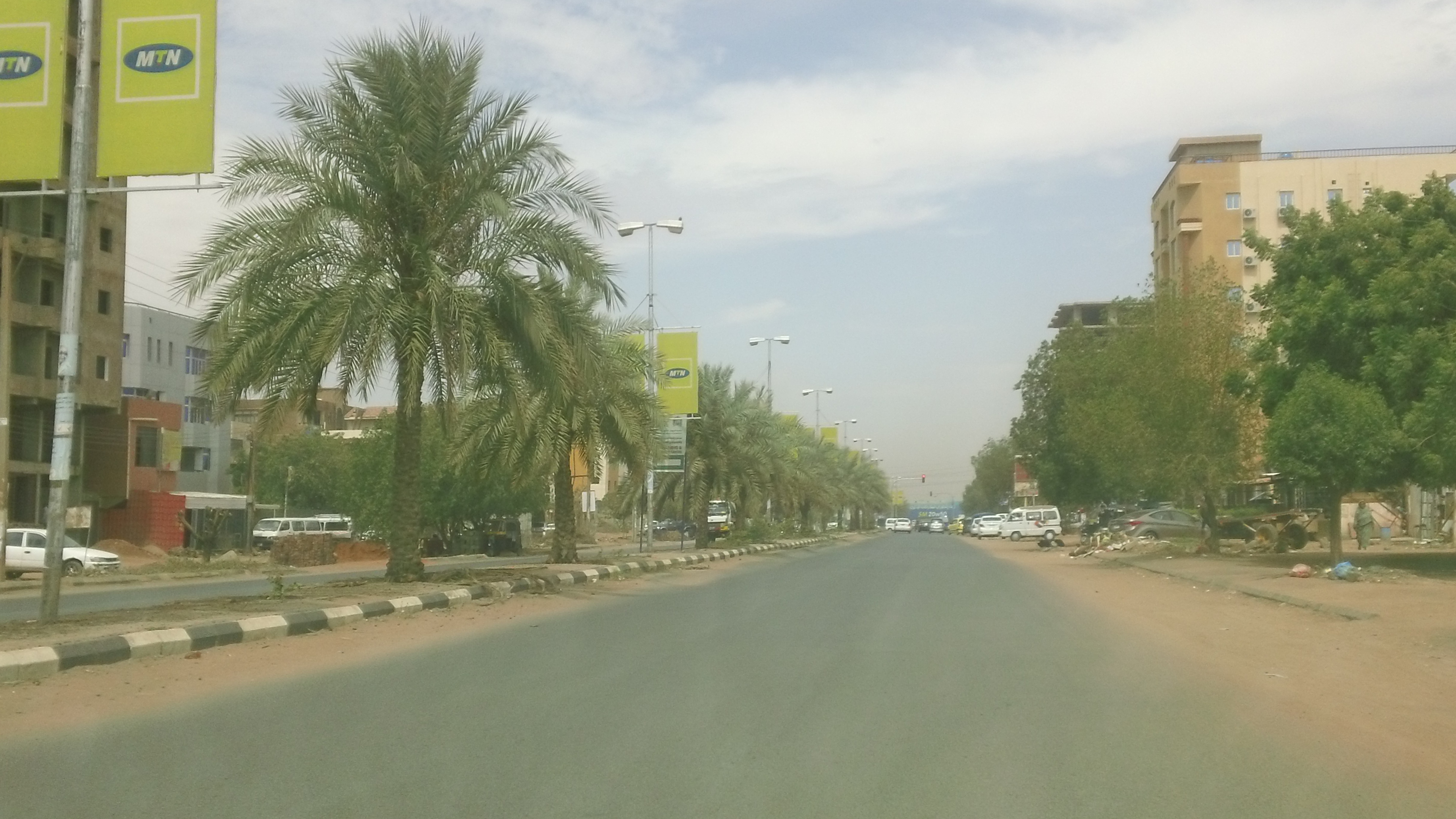

- Location in Sudan
- Coordinates: 15°34′45″N 32°34′6″E
- Country: Sudan
- State: Khartoum
- City: Khartoum
- Time zone: Central Africa Time, GMT + 3

Al-Riyad (Arabic: الرياض), or Riyadh, is one of the neighbourhoods of Khartoum, Sudan, located in the southern side of Khartoum. The affluent neighbourhood hosted Osama bin Laden's house in Khartoum.

== History ==
In 1991, Osama bin Laden purchased a house in the affluent Riyadh neighbourhood of the city and another in Soba. He lived there until 1996, when he was banished from the country. Following the 1998 U.S. embassy bombings, the United States accused bin Laden's al-Qaeda group and, on 20 August, launched cruise missile attacks on the al-Shifa pharmaceutical factory in Khartoum North. The factory's destruction created diplomatic tension between the U.S. and Sudan. The factory ruins are now a tourist attraction.

The University of Medical Sciences and Technology (UMST) was built the Riyadh district of Khartoum. It first opened its doors in 1995 with a student body of only forty students and two faculties. In 2017, it had become home to 5,000-6,000 students and costs US$15,000 for the school of medicine in 2018.

Riyadh is also home to the Riyadh Park.
