= General Directorate of Intelligence =

National intelligence and security service of Afghanistan

- Pashto: د استخباراتو لوی ریاست; Dari: ریاست عمومی استخبارات
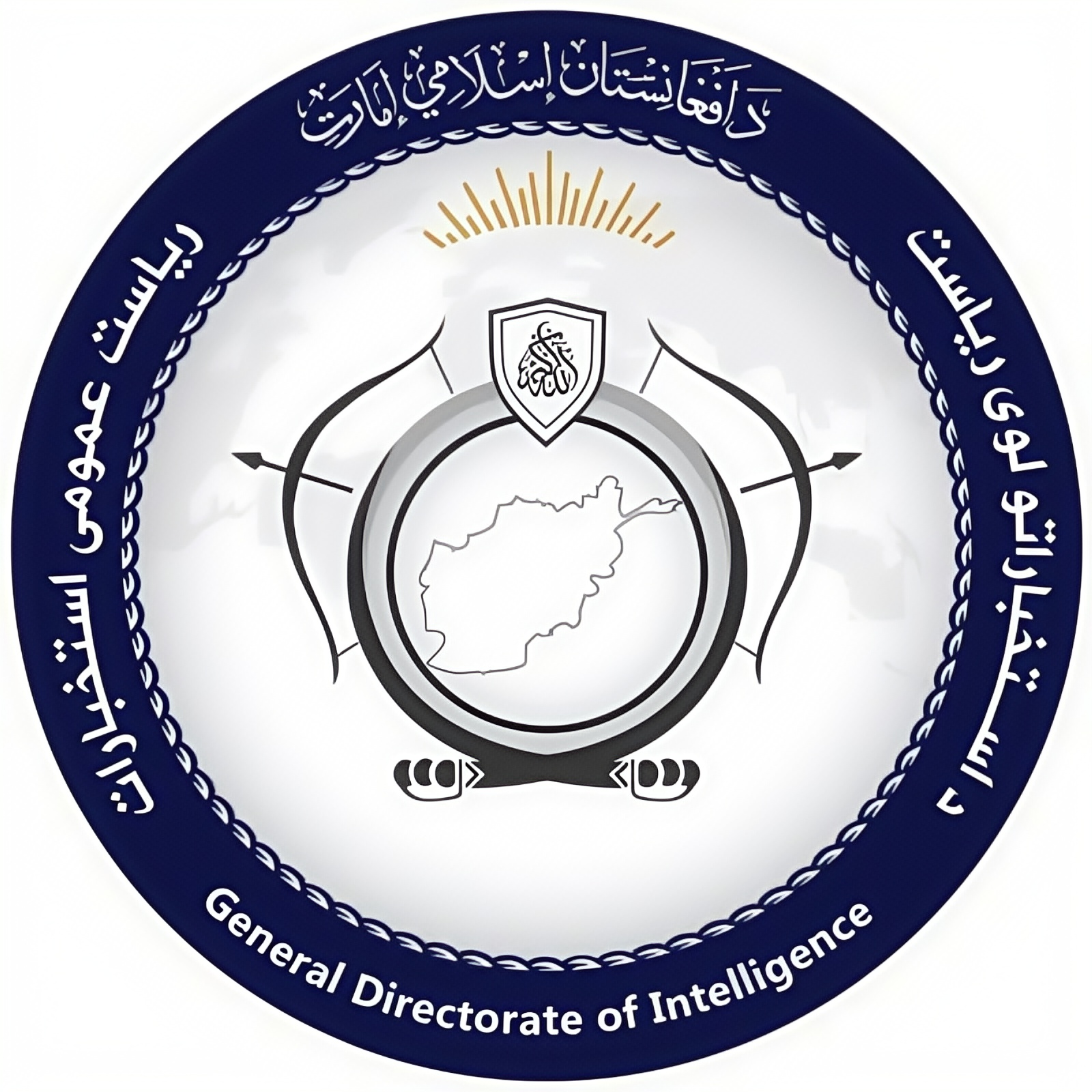
- Seal of the General Directorate of Intelligence

Agency overview
- Formed: 2021
- Preceding agencies: NDS (2002–2021); WAD (1986–1992); KHAD (1980–1986); KAM (1979–1979); AGSA (1978–1979); Istikhbarat (–1978)
- Jurisdiction: Islamic Emirate of Afghanistan
- Headquarters: Shahdarak, Kabul, Afghanistan
- Motto: "We Strike to Destroy"
- Employees: Classified
- Annual budget: Classified
- Minister of Defense responsible: Mohammad Yaqoob
- Deputy Minister responsible: Abdul Qayyum Zakir
- Agency executives: Abdul Haq Wasiq, (Director general); Rahmatullah Najib Taj Mir Jawad, (Deputy directors)
- Parent agency: Ministry of Defense
- Website: Official X

The General Directorate of Intelligence (GDI; Pashto: د استخباراتو لوی ریاست; Dari: ریاست عمومی استخبارات) is the Afghan national intelligence and security agency under the Islamic Emirate of Afghanistan. The GDI typically provides intelligence on both foreign and domestic issues for the current Afghan Taliban leader, Akhundzada.

== Organization ==
The GDI is a standalone directorate within the government of the Islamic Emirate of Afghanistan, answerable to the Supreme Leader. Abdul Haq Wasiq is the agency's current director, presiding over several subordinate deputies and directorates. Mullah Taj Mir Jawid is the first deputy director overseeing the GDI’s counterintelligence, intelligence gathering, and internal security operations. Mullah Bismullah Abdullah is the second deputy director, overseeing the agency’s finances and administration.

Outside the above individuals, there are several directorates with dedicated areas of responsibility. These include:

- Directorate 02 - monitors opium trade and associated financial activity
- Directorate 376 - manages agency interactions with non-governmental organizations and private security contractors, focusing on counterintelligence and secret policing
- Directorate 90 - manages relations with allied militant groups in Afghanistan
- Directorate 59 - manages agency relations with diplomatic missions in Afghanistan
- Directorate 12 - monitors and oversees activities of allied foreign militant groups operating in Afghanistan

Under Taj Mir Jawad specifically, the GDI also operate dedicated special forces units. These include:

- Fateh Force - a counterinsurgency and counterterrorism formation consisting of approximately 3,500 fighters to combat IS-KP.
- Umari Force - another counterinsurgency and counterterrorism formation founded to combat IS-KP under Mohammad Yaqoob’s command, but its staffing is unknown.

== Activities ==
Since the Taliban takeover in August 2021, six hundred ISIS members, four kidnappers, dozens of mafia and other criminals have been arrested by the GDI.

Despite Taliban pledges to be tolerant, the GDI announced on March 2, 2022, that Afghan media must show a "press-friendly" image of the Taliban while they pressure reporters on rules that should not contradict Islamic values.

== Directors ==
- Abdul Haq Wasiq (7 September 2021 – present)
