= Taj Mir Jawad =

Afghan Deputy Director of Intelligence since 2021

Mullah Taj Mir Jawad تاج مير جواد

Deputy Director of Intelligence
- Incumbent
- Assumed office 7 September 2021 Serving with Rahmatullah Najib
- Supreme Leader: Hibatullah Akhundzada
- Prime Minister: Mohammad Hassan Akhund

Personal details
- Party: Taliban
- Occupation: Politician, Taliban member

Mullah Taj Mir Jawad (Pashto: تاج مير جواد [tɑd͡ʒ ˈmir d͡ʒaˈwɑd]), also spelt Tajmir Jawad, is the Deputy Director of Intelligence of the Islamic Emirate of Afghanistan since 7 September 2021, alongside Rahmatullah Najib. He is a senior leader of the Haqqani network.

== Career ==
From 2008, Jawad was believed to be the operational head of several suicide attacks in Kabul as part of the "Kabul Attack Network", most notably the 2011 Inter-Continental Hotel Kabul attack. At this time, he was believed by Afghan and US officials to be living freely in Peshawar, Pakistan.

In 2018, Afghan Head of the National Directorate of Security Rahmatullah Nabil blamed Jawad for supervising the Al-Hamza Martyrdom Brigade, a training centre for suicide bombers that he said trained the assassin of police chief Abdul Raziq Achakzai, who had been assassinated that year.

On 7 September 2021, Jawad was made deputy director of Intelligence of the Islamic Emirate of Afghanistan, alongside Rahmatullah Najib, under Director of Intelligence Abdul Haq Wasiq.
