= 2011 Inter-Continental Hotel Kabul attack =

Suicide attack at the Inter-Continental Hotel

- Part of War in Afghanistan (2001–2021)
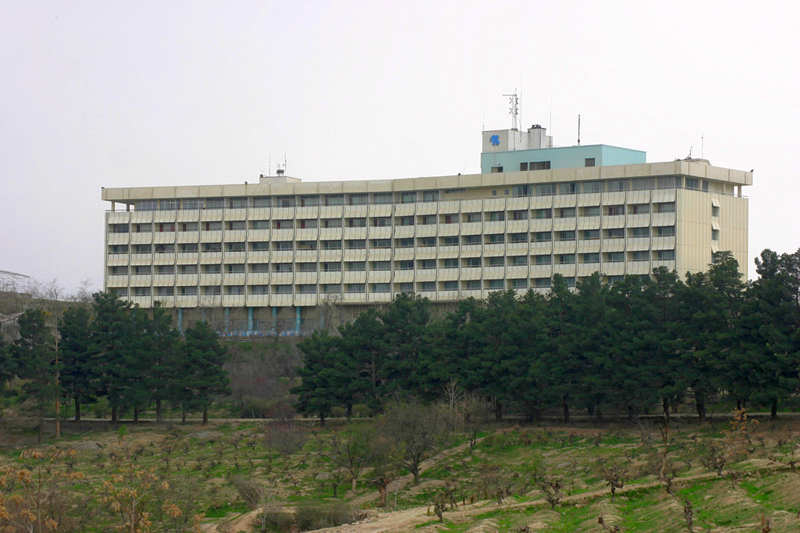
- The Hotel Inter-Continental Kabul, where the attack took place
- Location: 34°32′13″N 69°07′31″E; Kabul, Afghanistan
- Date: 28 June 2011
- Target: Hotel Inter-Continental Kabul
- Weapons: Guns, grenades, explosive belts
- Deaths: 12 (+9)
- Injuries: Unknown
- Perpetrator: Taliban

On 28 June 2011, a group of nine gunmen and suicide bombers attacked the Inter-Continental Hotel, Kabul. The attack and an ensuing five-hour siege left at least 21 people dead, including all nine attackers. Responsibility was claimed by the Taliban. It has been reported that the affiliated Pakistan-based Haqqani network was behind the attack.

== Background ==
Sixty to seventy guests were believed to be staying at the hotel at the time of the attacks. Thirty provincial government officials were staying at the hotel to attend a briefing about the transition of security responsibilities from the U.S. Military to the Afghan security forces. Most of the hotel's guests were in the hotel's dining hall at the time of the attack. Initial reports suggested that a wedding party may also have been hosted in one of the dance halls.

== Attack ==
The attackers passed three security checkpoints and made their way to the rear of the hotel under concealment of thick vegetation. The assault on the hotel began at 10:00 p.m. local time armed with assault rifles, hand grenades, rocket-propelled grenade launchers, machine guns, and anti-aircraft weapons. Armed Afghan law enforcement personnel fled the area and failed to engage the attackers. Nine attackers were captured on surveillance camera entering through the rear hotel garden where only two guards were stationed during a dinner for hotel guests. Suicide vests were detonated at the entrance to the hotel and on the second floor. Two dance halls were destroyed in the initial attack. The attackers then ascended to the fifth floor. Exchanges of weapon fire between law enforcement occurred until the early morning hours.

Hotel guests were told to barricade themselves in their rooms; some escaped by jumping from the hotel's windows.

== Termination of the attack ==
New Zealand Special Air Service (NZSAS) and officers from the CRU (the Afghan National Police counter-terrorism Crisis Response Unit) ascended the first two floors, killing a militant in the process. The security forces attempted to disarm the explosive vest the attacker was wearing.

Commander Jamie Pennell, who led NZSAS forces during the attack, has described the attack in detail in his 2024 memoir Serviceman J.

"Once inside the third floor, I discussed an adapted plan with the CRU squadron commander. By this time, there were CRU guys holding every floor, and that gave us the ability to start getting the guests out of their rooms and to safety."

Pennell took "a smaller SAS team and a couple of CRU members" silently up the hotel's southern stairwell, telling the larger SAS group to distract the militants on top of the roof. "But, when we finally got to the top, the door to the roof had a metal bar across it with a padlock, preventing a soft entry." A charge was placed on the door and Pennell called more CRU officers up to assist in storming the roof where attackers (some wearing explosive vests) had taken up firing positions.

Three combatants on the hotel roof were attacked by two of three circling helicopters coordinated by SAS Taskforce HQ. Members of the NZSAS also provided 'helo sniping' support. The militants may have been killed in the strike or may have detonated their vests. One U.S. Blackhawk helicopter carried International Security Assistance Force (ISAF) snipers while an MC-12W Liberty and an MQ-1 Predator remotely piloted aircraft provided critical aerial surveillance. Afghan policemen could not be coaxed by police chief Mohammad Ayoub Salangi to enter the building after the attackers were killed. At one point, an Afghan intelligence official informed the press that it believed it had eliminated all but one militant. One injured suicide bomber hid in a hotel room and ambushed and killed a Spanish pilot after the declared conclusion of operations. In his book Commander Pennell describes returning to the hotel to try to flush out the last attacker.

The Afghan intelligence service released footage that had been taken by a NATO drone hovering over the hotel during the siege. The footage showed two gunmen on the roof on the phone to commanders in Pakistan. Their calls were recorded. One of these commanders was Badruddin Haqqani, a notorious figure on a US list of designated terrorists.

Electricity to the hotel was restored after the end of military operations, and a scheduled briefing on the transition of security responsibilities from the U.S. Military to the Afghan security forces proceeded the next day.

== Victims ==
Among the wounded were two NZSAS personnel, including Corporal 'Steve' David Steven Askin; five Afghan policemen and thirteen civilians. Five hotel staff including one hotel security guard and a hotel chef, and three policemen were killed.

== Perpetrators ==
Taliban spokesman, Zabiullah Mujahid claimed Taliban responsibility for the attack and lauded the militants that killed "dozens of the foreign and local top-level officials". The Long War Journal reported that the attack was carried out by the "Kabul Attack Network". According to the Journal, the network was an ad hoc organization with insurgents and operatives from Afghan and Pakistani Taliban groups, the Haqqani network, Hizb-i-Islami Gulbuddin, and with support from Lashkar-e-Taiba and al Qaeda. The network is led by Dawood (also spelled Daud), the Taliban's shadow governor for Kabul, and Taj Mir Jawad, a leader in the Haqqani network. The Journal also stated that the organization is sometimes assisted by Pakistan's Inter-Services Intelligence agency.

The ISAF believes that the operation was supplied by the Haqqani network. Ismail Jan, Deputy to the senior Haqqani commander, was killed in an airstrike in Paktia province which borders Pakistan's FATA a day after the attack.

== Awards ==
Commander Jamie Pennell and Corporal David Steven Askin of the NZSAS were both awarded New Zealand's second-highest military award – the New Zealand Gallantry Star – for their role in resolving the 2011 Inter-Continental Hotel Kabul attack.

== See also ==
- 2018 Inter-Continental Hotel Kabul attack
- List of terrorist attacks in Kabul
