= 1987 Karachi car bombing =

Incident of two car bomb blasts in July 1987 in Karachi, Pakistan

- Part of the Spillover of Soviet - Afghan war in Pakistan
- Location: 24.8625°N 67.0165°E; Bohri Bazaar, Karachi, Pakistan
- Date: 14 July 1987
- Attack type: Car bombing
- Weapon: Car bombs
- Deaths: 72
- Injuries: 250
- Accused: KhAD

The 1987 Karachi car bombing were two car bombings in Karachi, Pakistan on 14 July 1987 that killed 72 people and wounding 250.

== Bombings ==
On 14 July 1987, two vehicles drove into the Bohri Bazaar in Karachi, Pakistan packed with RDX and parked. The first car bomb detonated at about 6:30 pm outside a hairdresser's shop on Syedna Burhanuddin Street near a bus stop destroying eight shops and a hotel. The second car bomb detonated 30 minutes later on Raja Ghazanfar Ali Road which is about 100 yards away from the first car bombing. The car bomb detonated outside a record shop, setting multiple buildings on fire and destroying more dozen cars. The fires from the second car bomb continued burning for four hours. The double car bombing killed 72 people and injured 250. The Pakistani government blamed the Afghan intelligence agency for the car bombings. Pakistani opposition including the Muttahida Qaumi Movement blamed Ziaul-Haq's policy.

== Aftermath ==
This blast at Bohri Bazaar led Ramzan Chhipa to found Chhipa Welfare Association.

== See also ==
- KhAD
- Muttahida Qaumi Movement
- Zia-ul-Haq
