= KHAD =

Afghan state intelligence agency

- Pashto: د دولتي استخباراتو خدمت; Dari: خدمات اطلاعات دولتی; Da Dawlati Istikhbarato Khadamat; Khadamāt-e Aetlā'āt Dawlati
- KhAD emblem from 1980 to 1987

Agency overview
- Formed: January 1980; 46 years ago
- Preceding agencies: Istikhbarat (–1978); AGSA (1978–1979); KAM (1979–1979)
- Dissolved: January 9, 1986; 40 years ago
- Superseding agencies: WAD (1986–1992); NDS (2002–2021); GDI (2021–present)
- Type: Intelligence agency and security agency
- Headquarters: Shashdarak Centre, Kabul, Afghanistan
- Motto: A weapon in one hand, a book in the other

The State Intelligence Agency (Pashto: د دولتي استخباراتو خدمت Dari: خدمات اطلاعات دولتی) (also known as 'State Information Services' or 'Committee of State Security'), better known by the acronym KhAD, was the intelligence and security agency of the former Democratic Republic of Afghanistan.

The agency was directed to protect Revolutionary Council of the Republic of Afghanistan and economy interests and to counterinsurgency and counterintelligence within the Democratic Republic of Afghanistan. However, the agency pursued a proactive and reactive intelligence policy abroad (especially with neighboring countries) to gather intelligence that may pose a threat to the security of the Democratic Republic of Afghanistan, as well as conducting special intelligence activities for support military operations of the Armed Forces of the Democratic Republic of Afghanistan.

KHAD received foreign assistance through the KGB and the Stasi.

== History ==
=== Pre-KHAD (pre-1979) ===
Afghanistan had an intelligence agency known as the Istikhbarat or the Intelligence Report Directorate. However, observers have stated it was incompetent with Afghan leaders since it was ineffective as they preferred to use their personal connections instead. Sardar Abdul Wali, the commander of the 1st Central Army Corps, additionally had his own espionage and secret intelligence network where he prosecuted leftist groups such as the People's Democratic Party of Afghanistan and the supporters of Mohammad Daoud Khan. General Ismail Khan was also noted to have been a part of the Civil Secret Agency (CSA) during the “Decade of Constitution” and reign of Mohammad Zahir Shah.

After the events of the Saur Revolution, the PDPA established AGSA (Da Afghanistan da Gato da Saatane Adara or Afghan Agency for Safeguarding National Interest) as its domestic/foreign intelligence agency with Assadullah Sarwari serving as its first director. Sarwari was known for torturing anyone who disagreed with the PDPA. AGSA operations eventually led to an anti-PDPA insurgency. AGSA additionally had a secret code between members Meera Jan, Fazil Qadir and the head of AGSA’s investigation committee which was intercepted by Rahmatullah Omid, used for killing anyone who the Khalq deemed an enemy. The killings would take place at night. The code was used via telephone and was in the Russian language, with the transcript reading “How’s the weather like? Are we going to shoot, are we going to kill?”.

AGSA was additionally involved in the hangings of Parcham members in 1978 and the executions of the following people:

- Colonel Hidayatullah (Head of Operations of the Ministry of Defense)
- Major Arif
- Major Khaleelullah (Chief of Staff of the 242nd Parachute Battalion)
- Major Mohammed Anwar
- Major Jilani
- Major Seyair
- Major Shir Jan (242nd Parachute Battalion officer)
- Major Sayd Zamanudeen (242nd Parachute Battalion officer)
- Major Abdul Baqi
- Captain Mohammed Karim
- Major Inayat
- Commander Mohammed Musa (Afghan Air Force and Air Defense commander who received his Chief of Army Staff diploma from the United States)
- General Mohammed Younus (11th Division Commander)
- Commander Nowruz (Commander of the 7th Division’s 55th Regiment)
- General Sayd Abdul Ghani Khan
- General Mohammed Safar Khan Nuristani
- General Ahmad Shah Gardezi
- Lieutenant General Mohammed Musa Nuristani

In September 1979, AGSA was replaced with KAM (Da Kargarano Astekhbarati Moassessa or Workers' Intelligence Institute) under Hafizullah Amin's direction. Several AGSA officials were either placed under surveillance or were arrested. KAM had a total of 7000 employees.

Aziz Ahmed Akbari was called in to take over from Sarwari when he took refuge in the Soviet Embassy. After two months, Assadullah Amin was appointed by his uncle to lead KAM. KAM did not last long after the Soviets officially entered Afghanistan in late December 1979.

=== KHAD (1980–1986) ===
KHAD was created on 10 January 1980 and was officially announced by President Babrak Karmal, with 1,200 personnel inside the People's Democratic Party of Afghanistan who took over intelligence responsibilities from KAM in December 1979, with most of them being pro-Parchamites. The group was known as “the activists” and was active until March 1980, being initially headed by Mohammad Najibullah, alongside Dr. Baha who worked on establishing the structure that would later be referred to as KHAD.

After Soviet troops were deployed in Afghanistan, KHAD was expanded with Moscow's assistance, which includes sophisticated torture equipment. Najibullah took the opportunity of his post to rise within the PDPA before Major-General Ghulam Faruq Yaqubi took over KHAD duties in November 1985. Soviet advisors were known to work alongside KHAD personnel and major decisions are not made without their input. In some instances, KHAD agents accompanied KGB Kaskad (Cascade) operators on anti-mujahideen infiltration ops. KHAD personnel were also authorised to use any strategies necessary to ensure they did not disclose their identities as officers of the agency, as a former KHAD advisor stated that Pakistanis did not want to capture KHAD spetsnaz operatives alive. During an attack on army bases in Keran Valley led by Ahmad Shah Massoud in 1987, a base consisting of 200 soldiers immediately fell whereas 16 KHAD operatives continued to fight to their deaths for six hours. In the aftermath, two leaders committed suicide and one agent was killed which led to 13 operatives finally surrendering.

The agency's manpower increased from 1,200 to nearly 70,000 personnel. KHAD was able to turn some mujahideen groups to work with the PDPA by providing incentives such as small arms or money in return for their loyalty by attending loya jirgas and other pro-PDPA activities.

They've worked with the KGB to fund and assist Murtaza Bhutto for his involvement in the hijacking of Pakistan International Airlines Flight 326 and with Baluchistan and Sind dissidents, according to files obtained by Vasili Mitrokhin from KGB files. KHAD’s infiltration of various mujahideen groups did help to contribute to some of the infighting.

In 1986, KHAD was revamped into WAD.

== Recruitment ==
Before KHAD approached potential candidates for the agency’s officer base, they extensively screened the candidate beforehand, as well as secretly probed their entire family. Only PDPA members who were extremely loyal and belonged to pro-government families qualified for admission as officers. Women were also employed as NCOs and officers, although they were underrepresented in senior officer ranks.

Once recruited, KHAD NCOs and officers received intensive training known as Parawachi or Parwareshi and after the training was completed, recruits went through a trial period known as either Azmajchi or Azmayeshi, where they’d have to prove their loyalty by spying on their family members, arresting friends, partners and subjecting them to torture. Over time, the tasks seasoned recruits were asked to perform would only become more intense, being ordered to infiltrate the ranks of the Afghan mujahideen. On their first assignment, the recruits were transferred to KHAD/WAD sections actively engaged in tracking down “subversive elements”. Only those who proved their worth were promoted or transferred to sections with more administrative or technical activities.

Potential applicants may have been prompted to join KHAD as the role of officer provided material benefits, such as a salary ten times higher than that of a government official. KHAD officers were additionally exempt from conscription and had free access to alcohol and even prostitutes. If a KHAD officer was killed in action, their family would also receive financial compensation and benefits from the government. Most KHAD officials came from either Kabul or Parwan, with most of them belonging to the Parcham faction of the PDPA.

=== Training ===
Kaskad operators were responsible for training KHAD personnel. KHAD officers had to go through a mandatory training course in Kabul where they were taught about military logistics, how to recruit potential officers, organisation and how to identify covert meetings and networks. KHAD officers, starting from first lieutenant to lieutenant colonel, were given mandatory training at the KGB School at Balashikha, Uzbekistan, and other KGB training facilities. Unlike the mandatory training in Kabul, the course in Tashkent included interrogation and criminal investigation techniques. High-ranking KHAD officers, starting from the rank of colonel and upwards, received additional mandatory training in Moscow. Unlike other techniques taught to officers in Kabul, Balashikha and Uzbekistan, the higher-ranking officers would receive training on management and policy issues, as well as financial affairs.

== Psychological warfare and state-sponsored terrorism ==
=== Prostitution spy rings ===
In mid-1985, the Soviet Union and Kabul launched psychological warfare against Pakistan in an attempt to morally destabilize society. As part of this strategy, the KGB and KHAD deployed hundreds of young girls of Central Asian, and Russian origin to corrupt Pakistani society. This influx initially targeted the major urban centers such as Islamabad, Lahore, Karachi, Faisalabad, Multan, and Quetta. These groups of prostitutes strategically selected affluent areas in these cities and operated within a well-organized structure. Many of these prostitutes had connections to KGB and KHAD agents, with high-ranking government officials and Pakistan army officers being their primary targets. This led to the emergence of a "galemjum (prostitute) culture" in Pakistani society, which attracted professionals, the local commercial class, and frustrated youth in various urban centers.

=== State-sponsored terrorism ===
According to a report by the US Defense Department, approximately 90% of the estimated 777 acts of international terrorism committed worldwide in 1987 took place in Pakistan. By 1988, KGB and KHAD agents were able to penetrate deep inside Pakistan and carry out attacks on mujahideen sanctuaries and guerrilla bases. There was strong circumstantial evidence implicating Moscow-Kabul in the August 1988 assassination of Zia ul-Haq, as the Soviets perceived that Zia wanted to adversely affect the Geneva process. WAD/KHAD has also been suspected behind the assassination of Palestinian jihadist Abdullah Yusuf Azzam alongside his son in 1989.

Afghanistan's KHAD was one of four secret service agencies accused of perpetrating terrorist bombings in multiple Pakistani cities including Islamabad, Lahore, Karachi, and Rawalpindi during the early 1980s resulting in hundreds of civilian casualties. By the late 1980s, the United States Department of State (DOS) blamed WAD for the perpetration of terrorist bombings in Pakistani cities. Between the late 1970s and the early 1990s, Afghanistan security agencies supported the terrorist organization called al-Zulfiqar, the group that hijacked a Pakistan International Airlines plane from Karachi to Kabul in 1981. Notable attacks include the Karachi Car bombing and an attempted car bombing on the US consulate in Peshawar which ended up killing over 30 people in 1987.

=== The hathora murders of Karachi ===
Around 1985, Pakistani police in the city of Karachi were becoming alarmed by an increased number of killings. While the murders took place in different areas of the city, an investigation found these murders were done in the same manner; a single blow to the head with a hathora (the word for 'hammer' in Urdu). Upon investigation of the victims and their backgrounds, it was found that they were all street urchins or beggars on the streets.

None of the victims of the Hathora group survived apart from one person, who described the murderers as men in “white suits and black masks” who drove a white Suzuki vehicle. Upon realization that these murders were being committed by a group, newspapers across the nation began to report the victim's story and referred to these men as "the Hathora Group" owing to their method of using hammers to murder their victims. Police didn’t know who these men were and what motives they had to do commit these murders. For a while, these cases of murders stopped and then finally resumed around some time in mid-1986. For nearly 2 years, the city of Karachi was terrorised by the horrors of such group, with civilians fearing they would enter their homes and be killed by the Hathora group.

Some Pakistanis newspapers alluded that the Hathora group was actually made up of members of the Soviet intelligence agency, the KGB, and KHAD, who were striking back due to the Pakistani government backing the Afghan mujahideen against the Democratic Republic of Afghanistan. A sociologist, when asked about these killings, mentioned that the chaos that was occurring in Karachi was easily manipulated by groups for their own motives. The sociologist strongly believed that these killings were planned to spread more fear in the city, which could be the intention of KHAD and the motive behind the murders, although it is unknown if KHAD was behind these murders.

== Structure ==
=== KHAD ===
KHAD was known to have the following organizational structures in place:

==== Headquarters ====
- Directorate of Administration and Finance
- Directorate of Cadre / Personnel
- Directorate of Interrogation
- Directorate of Intelligence and Afghan Diplomatic Missions Abroad
- Directorate of Post and Parcels
- Directorate for Operative Activities for Internal Control of KHAD Personnel
- Directorate for Economy and Anti Corruption
- Directorate for Counter Rebellion: Two Sub-Directorates covering 16 provinces each. Known to have three military battalions based in Kabul to assist with arrests and other investigative work.
- Directorate for Surveillance of Foreign and National Suspects
- Directorate of the Press and Educational Institutions
- Directorate for the Protection of the Government and its Representatives
- Directorate of Propaganda and Counter-Propaganda
- Directorate of Telecommunications and Decoding
- Directorate for Activities Linked to Infiltration of Mujaheddin
- Directorate of Logistics
- Directorate for Agents and Informers
- Directorate of Analysis and Reporting
- Tenth Directorate (Foreign Intelligence)
- KhAD-e-Nezami (Military Intelligence)/Military KHAD: Embedded in the Ministry of Defense to prevent infiltration by mujahideen groups.
- Police KHAD: Embedded in the Ministry of Interior to prevent infiltration by mujahideen groups.
- Air Force and Air Defense Command KHAD Department

==== Provincial ====
- Administration and Finance
- Cadre / Personnel Directorate
- Surveillance of foreign and national suspects
- Interrogation
- Post and Parcels
- Operative activities for internal control of KHAD personnel
- Propaganda and counter-propaganda
- Economy and Anti-Corruption
- Press and Educational institutions
- Logistics
- Counter-Rebellion: 2 Sub-Directorates covering 16 Provinces each
- Protection of the government and its representatives
- Telecommunication and Decoding
- Activities linked to infiltration of Mujaheddin
- Agents and Informer Unit
- Analysis and Reporting
- City District Offices
- Rural District Offices
- Military and Police KHAD within the respective ministries' structures

While not part of the KHAD structure, militias recruited from tribal and anti-government militias who agreed to work with them, are finally supported by the agency. KHAD also had its own spetsnaz units, attached to each province which included between 250-300 personnel. KHAD-e Nezami, the military intelligence agency of the Afghan Army, additionally had four Afghan spetsnaz battalions under their control, such as the:

- 203rd Separate Spetsnaz Battalion (Kabul)
- 211th Separate Spetsnaz Battalion (Jalalabad)
- 212th Separate Spetsnaz Battalion (Gardez)
- 230th Separate Spetsnaz Battalion (Kandahar)

== Human rights abuses ==
KHAD was also accused of human rights abuses in the mid-1980s. These included the use of torture, the use of predetermined "show trials" to dispose of political prisoners, and widespread arbitrary arrest and detention. Secret trials and the execution of prisoners without trial were also common. By 1989 KHAD had arrested nearly 150,000 people (although many were released).

It was especially active and aggressive in the urban centers, especially in Kabul. Organizations such as Amnesty International continued to publish detailed reports of KHAD's use of torture and of inhumane conditions in the country's prisons and jails. In 1989, the Special Rapporteur of the United Nations Commission on Human Rights (UNCHR) visited both Sedarat and Shashdarak, one of many prisons for those arrested by the agency, and found out that the hygienic conditions in these prisons somewhat improved.

KHAD also operated eight detention centers in the capital, which were located at KHAD headquarters, at the Ministry of the Interior headquarters, and at a location known as the Central Interrogation Office. The most notorious of the Communist-run detention centers was Pul-e-Charkhi prison, where 27,000 political prisoners are thought to have been murdered. Recently mass graves of executed prisoners have been uncovered dating back to the Soviet Union era.

On 29 February 2000, when The Netherlands had no diplomatic mission in Afghanistan, the Dutch Ministry of Foreign Affairs published a disputed report on the involvement of the KHAD on human rights abuses, partly based on secret sources, allegedly biased political sycophants from the side of the Taliban and the Pakistani Inter-Services Intelligence (ISI). Some of its conclusions were already published in the Dutch press before the official publication of the full report. This report, quoted frequently in the cases of Afghan asylum seekers to support the exclusion ground of article 1F of the Convention Relating to the Status of Refugees in the national refugee policy of the Netherlands, was also published in an English translation on 26 April 2001. In 2008, another report on this matter was published by the UNHCR. In this report, some conclusions of the Dutch report were contested.

On 14 October 2005, the District Court in the Hague convicted two high-ranking KHAD officers who sought asylum in the Netherlands in the 1990s. Hesamuddin Hesam and Habibullah Jalalzoy were found guilty of complicity to torture and violations of the laws and customs of war, committed in Afghanistan in the 1980s. Hesam was sentenced to 12 years imprisonment. He was the head of the military intelligence service (KHAD-e-Nezami) and deputy minister of the Ministry of State Security (WAD). Jalalzoy was the head of the unit investigations and interrogations within the military intelligence of the KHAD. He was sentenced to 9 years imprisonment.

On 29 January 2007, the Dutch appeal court upheld the sentences. The judgements were confirmed by the Dutch Supreme Court on 10 July 2008.

On 25 June 2007, the District Court in the Hague acquitted another senior KHAD officer. General Abdullah Faqirzada was one of the deputy heads of the KHAD-e-Nezami from 1980 until 1987. Although the court held it plausible that Faqirzada was closely involved with the human rights abuses in the military branch of the KHAD, it concluded there was no evidence for his individual involvement nor his command responsibility for the specific crimes the charge was based upon. On 16 July 2009, the Dutch appeal court upheld the acquittal.

In a June 2005 report that was published by the United Nations Commission on Human Rights (UNCHR), it was stated that members of KHAD were not only at risk of reprisals from those who held positions of power in the Islamic Republic of Afghanistan, but also the families of those who were affected by human rights abuses committed by KHAD.

== Directors of KHAD and its predecessors ==
No.	Organization	Director	Took office	Left office	Political affiliation
1	AGSA	Assadullah Sarwari	April 1978	September 1979	PDPA – Khalq
2	KAM	Asadullah Amin	September 1979	December 1979	PDPA – Khalq
3	KHAD	Mohammad Najibullah	11 January 1980	21 November 1985	PDPA – Parcham
4	KHAD	Ghulam Faruq Yaqubi	6 December 1985	16 April 1992	PDPA – Parcham

== Notable people ==
- Dr Mohammad Najibullah Ahmadzai, President Of The Republic Of Afghanistan from 1987 to 1992
- Haneef Atmar, Founder of the Truth and Justice Eurasian Party
- Abdul Jabar Qahraman, defacto ruler of Helmand from 1992 to 1993
- KHAD-e-Nezami (Military Intelligence)
  - Shahnawaz Tanai, Head of the Agency after the Communist Coup
  - Heshamuddin Hesam, Head of the Agency from 1983 to 1991, Convicted of warcrimes at the Hague in 2005
  - Habibulla Jalalzoy, Head of the Interrogation Department, Convicted of warcrimes at the Hague in 2005

== In popular culture ==
The 1991 Afghan film "Gumashta" (Agent) was based around a KHAD operative hunting down a Narcotics ring. In the Russian war movie “Leaving Afghanistan”, the character “Majed” is a KHAD intelligence officer. KHAD is also mentioned in the Russian mini series “Caravan Hunters” and the film “Afganets.”

== See also ==
- 1987 Karachi Car bombing
- Ojhri Camp disaster
- Pakistan International Airlines Flight 326
