= Meena Bazaar, Karimabad =

Bazaar located in Pakistan

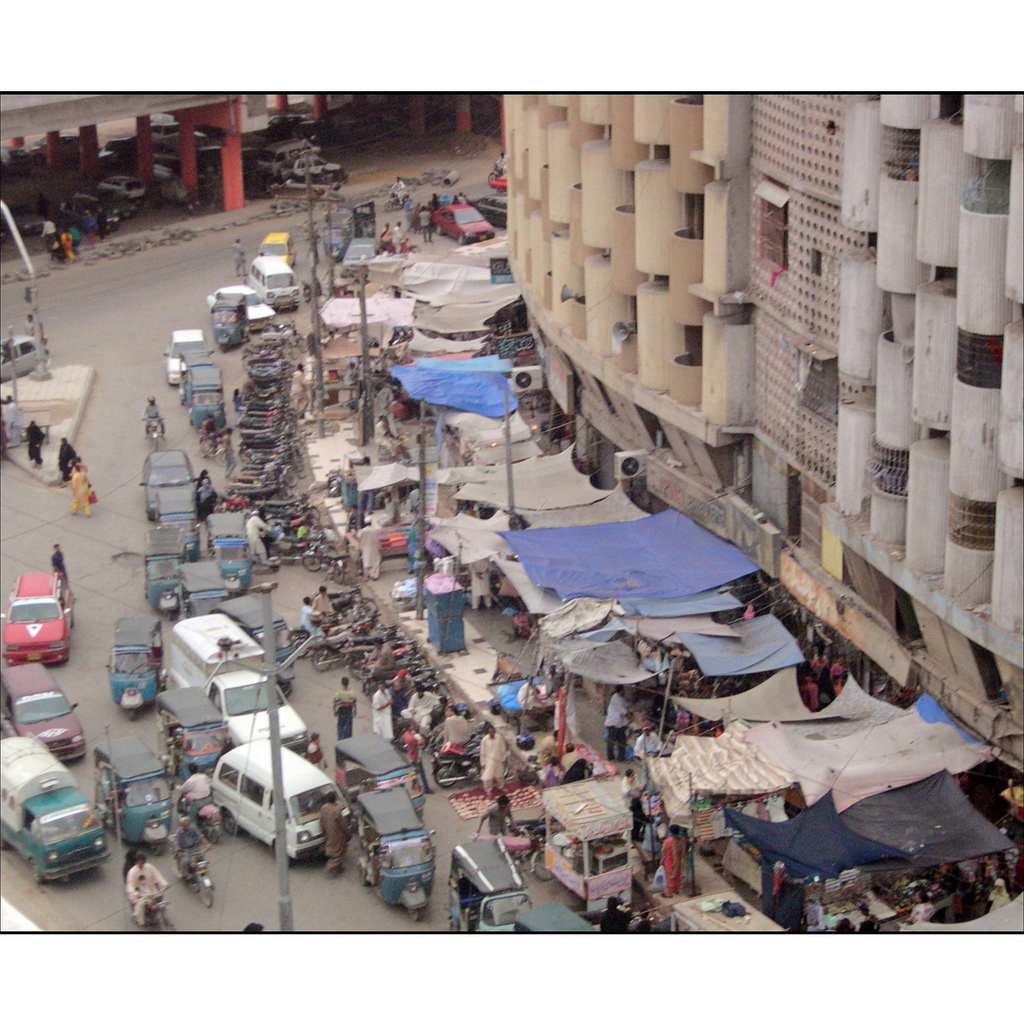
Meena Bazaar, Karimabad, Karachi.

Meena Bazar, Karimabad (Urdu: مینا بازار، کریم آباد) is a bazaar located in Karimabad area of Gulberg Town in Karachi, Sindh, Pakistan.

It was inaugurated in 1974.

== Woman-centered shopping street ==
It is a woman-centered shopping street with ladies wear, fashion shops for ladies, restaurants and with a few men's wear shops. There is also a sports equipment market nearby. It also has many mehndi or henna shops for dyeing ladies' hands for special occasions like wedding events and Eid.

According to a major newspaper of Pakistan, "For decades, it was a must-visit place for brides-to-be before their wedding day, and for girls on Chand Raat to have mehndi applied on their hands".

Mostly items like jewelry, dupattas, glass and metal 'choorian' (bangles), cosmetics and khussas (female footwear) are sold in the Meena Bazaar shopping street. In addition, many mehndi-applying stalls, beauty parlors and ladies tailors are located in this marketplace.

== Legacy of Mughal-era in India ==
According to a major newspaper of Pakistan:

"In the Mughal Era, during the Nauroze, special bazaars would be set up only for women. These women came to prepare for the 5 to 8 day festivities and the Mughal Kings and Princes were the only men allowed. It was usually famous among the women of the Harem (Mughal Concubines) and the wives and daughters of Rajput noblemen who put up stalls to sell expensive items".

== Popular tourist attraction ==
Meena Bazaar is also popular among tourists looking for locations of cultural interest in Karachi.

== See also ==
- Empress Market
