= Ghulam Faruq Yaqubi =

Afghan politician and military General

Minister of State Security Afghanistan
- In office 6 December 1985 – 16 April 1992
- Preceded by: Mohammad Najibullah
- Chairman of Council of Ministers: Sultan Ali Keshtmand; Mohammad Hasan Sharq; Fazal Haq Khaliqyar

Personal details
- Born: 1938 Kabul, Kingdom of Afghanistan
- Died: 16 April 1992 (aged 53–54) Kabul, Republic of Afghanistan
- Party: People's Democratic Party of Afghanistan

Military service
- Allegiance: Republic of Afghanistan

Ghulam Faruq Yaqubi (1938 – 16 April 1992) was an Afghan politician and Army General. He was a significant figure In the Afghan Security Service, KHAD, from 1980 to 1985.

== Early life and education ==
Born in Kabul, son of Khan Muhammad, and educated at the Najat School, Kabul police academy and in West Germany.

== Career ==
He began his career as a lecturer at the Kabul police academy in 1966. Subsequently, he served as the director of operations and general director of the criminal department in Ministry of Interior Affairs. Yakubi was promoted both to Politburo status and the rank of Colonel General, the highest rank held by the regime's military. In 1986 the KHAD became a separate ministry under the name Ministry of State Security (WAD). The ministry was personally controlled by him, who started to take part in cabinet meetings in a ministerial capacity.

He was responsible for the defeat of a coup attempt on March 6, 1990. In that opportunity, Lieut. Gen. Shahnawaz Tanai and Gulbuddin Hekmatyar attempted to overthrow the Government, but their plans were discovered by the WAD under his command.

== Death ==
After the collapse of President Najibullah's government in April 1992, he was either assassinated by the Afghan mujahideen or committed suicide. Although the new ruling council eventually declared a general amnesty (excluding President Mohammad Najibullah and former AGSA head Assadullah Sawari), there were other instances of summary execution and reprisal killings by various forces after the coup. Some sources claimed that he killed himself after learning of the President's attempted escape.

== See also ==
- KhAD
- Assadullah Sawari
- Mohammad Najibullah

Government offices
Preceded by Mohammad Najibullah	General Secretary of KHAD; May 1986 — April, 1992	Succeeded by None – Government dissolved
Preceded by None – Position created	Minister of State Security; May 1986 — April, 1992	Succeeded by None – Government dissolved
