= Wadi al-Aqiq =

Sudanese company founded 1991 by Osama bin Laden

Wadi al-Aqiq (lit. 'valley of the brown gem') is a holding company founded in Sudan by Osama bin Laden in 1991, during the period he was based in that country.
