= Bohri Bazaar =

Shopping area in Karachi, Pakistan

Bohri Bazaar بوہری بازار
- Bazaar
- Country: Pakistan
- Province: Sindh
- City: Karachi
- Founded: 1939

Bohri Bazaar, also known as Bohra Bazaar, (Urdu: بوہری بازار) is a bazaar located in Saddar Town, Karachi, Sindh, Pakistan.

It is one of the oldest marketplaces of Karachi.

Bohri Bazaar was once the most famous shopping place in Karachi. It has historical importance similar to Istanbul’s Grand Bazaar.

== History ==
Bohri Bazaar was established in 1939 as a location for camps for colonial British military personnel. The bazaar named after Bohra community of Karachi. The community has built a mosque called Tahiri Masjid at the centre of the bazaar.

As of August 2022, the bazaar consists of at least 5,000 shops.

== Incidents ==
Parts of Bohri Bazaar were badly damaged in a fire in 1958 but were rebuilt, and again in the 1987 Karachi car bombing and were restored later.
