= 1970 Pul-e Khishti Mosque protest =

1970 demonstration in Afghanistan

Date	24 May 1970
Location	Pul-e Khishti Mosque, Kabul, Afghanistan
Result	Protest suppressed: Protestors successfully deported from Kabul

Belligerents
Afghanistan	Islamic clergy

Commanders and leaders
Mohammad Zahir Shah; Sardar Abdul Wali; Rahmatullah Safi; Mohammad Nabi Azimi	Muhammad Atta-ullah Faizani

Units involved
Royal Afghan Army; 1st Central Army Corps; 717th Civil Disciplinary Regiment; Afghan Commando Forces; 444th Commando Battalion	1,500–3,000 protestors

Strength
Unknown	1,500–3,000

Casualties and losses
None	None

The 1970 Pul-e Khishti Mosque Protest was a peaceful protest by the Islamic clergy, with 1,500-3,000 mullahs traveling to Kabul from the southern and eastern regions of Afghanistan to take part. Initially backed by the government of King Mohammad Zahir Shah to oppose “communism” and the activities of the People's Democratic Party of Afghanistan, the protest turned against the state, led by Muhammad Atta-ullah Faizani, prompting the Royal Afghan Army to intervene and suppress it.

== Background ==
Due to false rumours that Mohammad Hashim Maiwandwal was an agent of the CIA, he resigned as Prime Minister and on 1 November 1967, Mohammad Nur Ahmad Etemadi became the new Prime Minister of Afghanistan after a vote of confidence through the National Assembly. Despite being close to King Zahir Shah, he also held relationships with Mohammad Daoud Khan and was even alleged to have contact with the Soviet Union and hold “intangible” support for the Parcham faction of the People's Democratic Party of Afghanistan by the Afghan intelligentsia, drawing criticism from the Islamic clergy in Kabul and other regions of the country.

The clergy expressed dissatisfaction with the government over their lenience with leftist parties operating in Afghanistan, in particular, Parcham, which published a centenary celebrating the 100th birthday of Vladimir Lenin. They were also angered with the televising of anti-religious films about Prophet Jusuf, as well as caricatures of Prophet Muhammad and comments on his number of marriages being featured on the leftist publication Esalat. This would all culminate in a peaceful protest being held inside Pul-e Khishti Mosque and other mosques in the area.

== Protest ==
Initially, the government supported the protests, encouraging the Islamic clergy to protest against the People's Democratic Party of Afghanistan and other leftist organisations, seeing it as a way to simultaneously undermine leftist influence and strengthen its ties with conservative groups. Up to 1,500–3,000 mullahs took part, with many of them traveling from the southern and eastern provinces of Afghanistan to the central part of Kabul, led by Sufi Herati scholar Muhammad Atta-ullah Faizani. However, the protests soon turned into an anti-government rally, with the clergy accusing the government of undermining Afghanistan’s Islamic values and subjecting the country to Western influence.

As a result, Sardar Abdul Wali responded to the demands of the protestors with military action, planning an operation for the Royal Afghan Army to remove them from Pul-e Khishti Mosque and board them onto supplementary buses, where they would be taken back to their homes. The army units involved, the 717th Civil Disciplinary Regiment and the Afghan Commando Forces’ 444th Commando Battalion, were ordered to carry out the operation at night. This would be the first ever documented operation of the 444th Commando Battalion. The 717th, led by Mohammad Nabi Azimi, arrived at Pul-e Khishti Mosque at 2:00am, and alongside them, the 444th Commando Battalion arrived with tanks and armoured vehicles, led by Colonel Rahmatullah Safi. The soldiers saw thousands of protestors sleeping side-by-side outside and inside of the mosque, waking them up and ordering them to leave.

After their refusal, the soldiers used the stocks of their AK-47 rifles to get the protestors to disperse and leave through force, which led to the mullahs reluctantly accepting orders and ending their resistance, walking towards Maiwand Road where the buses mentioned by Sardar Abdul Wali were already parked and prepared to take the protestors home. They reluctantly queued up in order and went inside the buses while shouting slogans such as “Allah-u-Akbar” and “Death to Abdul Wali”. Despite this, soldiers from the 717th Civil Disciplinary Regiment accompanied the protestors while they were being transported back to their local areas.

== Aftermath ==
The main leader of the protest, Faizani, was arrested and imprisoned for a year and a half, alongside other leaders and prominent Islamic clergymen. After the Pul-e Khishti protest, more protests and incidents followed, with numerous clashes between left wing and right wing groups taking place, as well as those between university students and police officers, resulting in casualties for all parties involved. As Etemadi's mental health worsened, his failure to improve Afghanistan’s stagnating economy and pressure from both the parliament and his opposition led to him subsequently resigning from his position as Prime Minister on 24 September 1972. He was replaced with Mohammad Musa Shafiq, through a vote of confidence.
