= National anthem of the Republic of Afghanistan =

Former national anthem of Afghanistan

Śo če dā źməka āsmān wi
English: 'So Long as There Is Earth and Heaven'
- څو چې دا ځمكه آسمان وي
- Former national anthem of Afghanistan
- Lyrics: Abdul Rauf Benawa, 1973
- Music: Abdul Ghafoor Breshna, 1973
- Adopted: 1973; 53 years ago
- Relinquished: 1978; 48 years ago
- Preceded by: National anthem of the Kingdom of Afghanistan
- Succeeded by: National anthem of the Democratic Republic of Afghanistan

Audio sample
- Millī Surūd (U.S. Navy Band instrumental rendition in E-flat major) ملي سرود "The National Anthem": file; help

"So Long as There Is Earth and Heaven" (Pashto: څو چې دا ځمكه آسمان وي) was the national anthem of the Republic of Afghanistan from 1973 to 1978. In 1973, the Kingdom of Afghanistan was overthrown in a coup d'état and the Republic was established by Mohammad Daoud Khan, so the country began to formulate a new national anthem, because the second national anthem was a pure tribute to the king Mohammad Zahir Shah. In 1978, the Afghan military launched the Saur Revolution to overthrow the Republic, and the national anthem was abolished five years after its opening.

== Lyrics ==
Pashto original

څو چې دا ځمکه آسمان وي
څو چې دا جهان ودان وي
څو چې ژوند په دې جهان وي
څو چې پاتې يو افغان وي
تل به دا افغانستان وي
تل دې وي افغان ملت
تل دې وي جمهوريت
تل دې وي ملي وحدت
تل دې وي افغان ملت، جمهوريت
تل دې وي افغان ملت، جمهوريت
ملي وحدت، ملي وحدت

Romanization of Pashto

Śo če dā źməka āsəmān wi
Śo če dā jahān wadān wi
Śo če žwand pə de jahān wi
Śo če pāte yaw Āfǧān wi
Təl ba dā Āfǧānistān wi
Təl de wi Āfǧān millat
Təl de wi jumhuriyat
Təl de wi milli wahdat
Təl de wi Āfǧān millat, jumhuriyat
Təl de wi Āfǧān millat, jumhuriyat
Milli wahdat, milli wahdat.

IPA transcription

[t͡so t͡ʃe d̪ɑ ˈd͡zmə.ka ʔɑ.səˈmɑn wi]
[t͡so t͡ʃe d̪ɑ d͡ʒaˈhɑn waˈd̪ɑn wi
[t͡so t͡ʃe ʒwənd̪ pə de d͡ʒaˈhɑn wi]
[t͡so t͡ʃe ˈpɑ.t̪e jaʊ ʔaʊˈɣɑn wi]
[t̪əl ba d̪ɑ ʔaʊˌɣɑ.nisˈt̪ɑn wi]
[t̪əl d̪e wi ʔaʊˈɣɑn milˈlat̪]
[t̪əl d̪e wi d͡ʒumˌhu.ɾiˈjat̪]
[t̪əl d̪e wi milˈli wahˈd̪at̪]
[t̪əl d̪e wi ʔaʊˈɣɑn milˈlat̪ d͡ʒumˌhu.ɾiˈjat̪]
[t̪əl d̪e wi ʔaʊˈɣɑn milˈlat̪ d͡ʒumˌhu.ɾiˈjat̪]
[milˈli wahˈd̪at̪ milˈli wahˈd̪at̪]

English translation

So long as there is Earth and Heaven;
So long as the world is populated;
So long as there is life in the world;
So long as there exists a single Afghan;
There will always be this Afghanistan.
Long live the Afghan nation!
Long live the Republic!
Long live our national unity!
Long live the Afghan nation and the Republic!
Long live the Afghan nation, the Republic;
And our national unity — national unity!

== See also ==
- List of former national anthems
- National anthems of Afghanistan
- Music of Afghanistan
