= Rahmatullah Safi =

Afghan former army officer and mujahideen commander

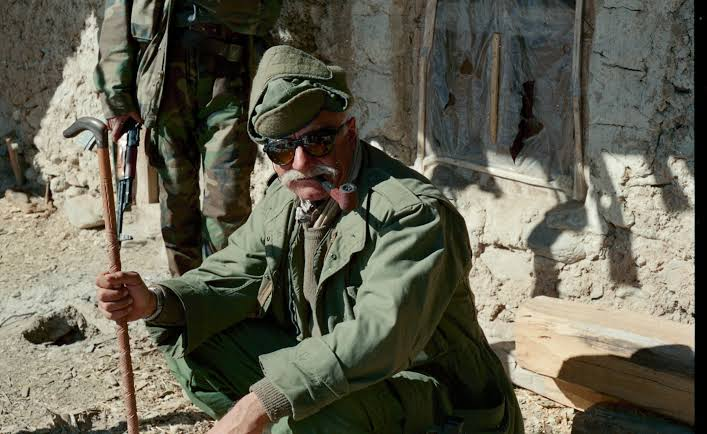
- General Rahmatullah Safi posing for camera

Personal details
- Born: 1948 (age 77–78) Afghanistan
- Occupation: Military general

Military service
- Allegiance: Kingdom of Afghanistan; National Islamic Front of Afghanistan
- Branch/service: Royal Afghan Army; Afghan Commando Forces
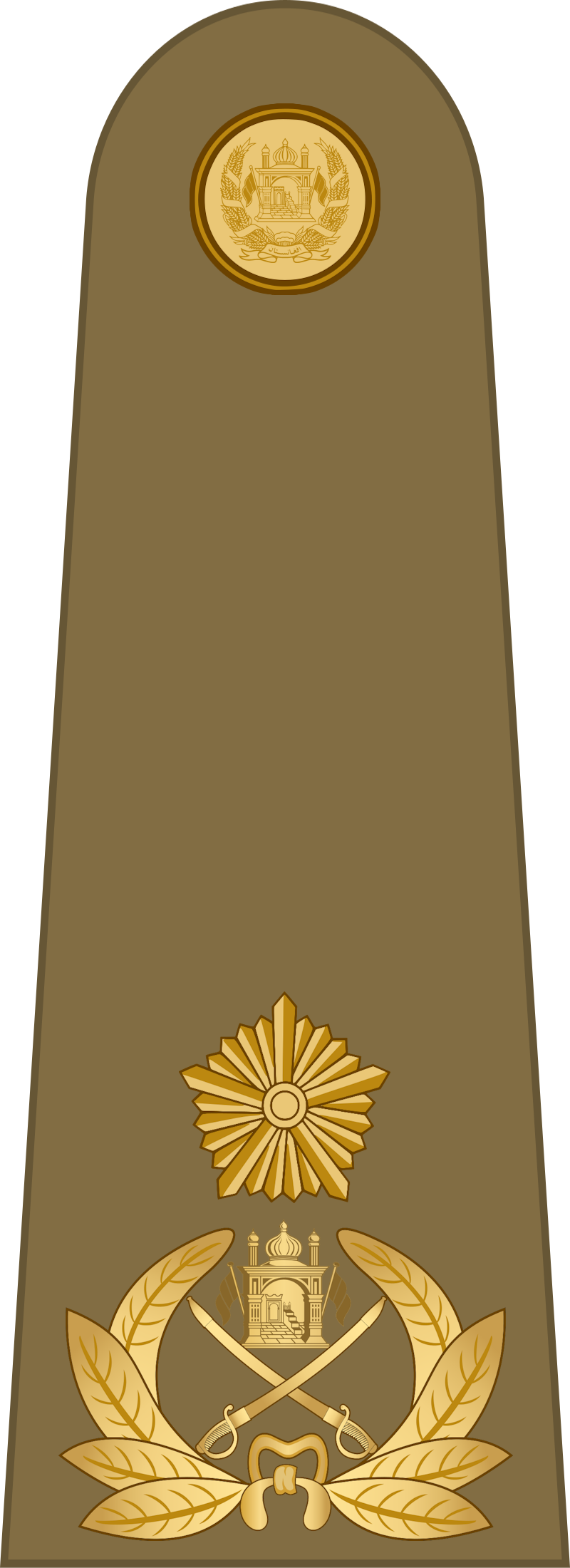
- Rank: Brigadier general
- Commands: 444th Commando Battalion
- Battles/wars: 1970 Pul-e Khishti Mosque protest Soviet-Afghan war

Brigadier General Rahmatullah Safi (born 1948) is an Afghan former army officer, former commander of the 444th Commando Battalion under the Kingdom of Afghanistan and mujahideen commander who fought during the Soviet–Afghan War. He was later claimed to have been the representative of the Taliban movement in Europe.

Formerly a colonel in the Royal Afghan Army, he trained an elite commando force of 1,600 men during the reign of king Zahir Shah, known as the 444th Commando Battalion. On 24 May 1970, he led the battalion during an anti-government protest by the Islamic clergy in Pul-e Khishti Mosque, Kabul. The commandos under his command deported the protestors from the capital with supplementary buses parked on Maiwand Road. He was additionally part of Sardar Abdul Wali’s espionage and secret intelligence network, being described as an "admirer" and a "devotee". The specific duties of the agents in Wali’s network included identifying leftist elements and activity, detecting suspicious movements and monitoring the activities of the leftist political organisations within the Royal Afghan Army, such as People's Democratic Party of Afghanistan.

When Mohammed Daoud Khan took power, he left Afghanistan for England where he was trained by Britain's MI6. Following the Soviet invasion of Afghanistan in 1979, he joined the National Islamic Front of Afghanistan, a mujahideen party led by Pir Sayyed Ahmed Gailani. He and his officers were trained by Britain's MI6 as a pledge to support the resistance against the Soviet Union. He and his men would return a year later and set up his base in Peshawar.

As a mujahideen commander, Rahmatullah Safi operated in Paktia and Kunar provinces, taking part in the 1986 Zhawar fighting. He was in charge of NIFA's training facilities, where he claimed to have trained some 8,000 mujahideen, possibly with British assistance. In 1985 Safi led a delegation of mujaheddin to the United States, where the general spoke at colleges and universities in more than a dozen US cities. Safi was hospitalized in Pittsburgh in 1986 for cardiac evaluation tests; his medical bills were paid by donations and the Committee for a Free Afghanistan.

In 1998, Safi was living in London, England, but departed to Afghanistan along with Nabi Misdak to convince Mullah Omar to hand over Osama bin Laden to foreign authorities; and he was considered the representative of the Taliban in Europe according to a United Nations Security Council press release.

In 2004, Safi resigned his military commission and announced his intention to run in the 2004 Afghan presidential election.
