= Philip Sessarego =

British writer (1952–2008)

- Born: 31 December 1952; England, U.K.
- Died: November 2008 (aged 55); Antwerp, Belgium
- Resting place: Hereford, England, UK
- Other names: Philip Stevenson; Tom Carew
- Occupations: Soldier, author
- Known for: Confrontation with interviewer on Newsnight
- Notable work: Jihad! – The Secret War in Afghanistan
- Children: four

Philip Anthony Sessarego (31 December 1952 – November 2008), also known by the pen-name Tom Carew, was a British soldier, adventurer and author, who published the best-selling book Jihad! – The Secret War in Afghanistan. His reputation and credibility were damaged by the revelation of false claims in the book, after which he retired from the public spotlight.

== Early life ==
Sessarego was reportedly born and raised in Herefordshire, UK. Not long after Philip was born, his mother, Marie, moved to Hereford. An uncle and aunt, whom he often lived with, owned a farm nearby.

== Military career ==
In 1971, at the age of 18, Sessarego enlisted into the British Army as a gunner in the Royal Artillery. After two years' service, in 1973, he applied to join the Special Air Service (SAS) at the age of 21, which was approved by the Royal Artillery. During aptitude trials for the SAS he narrowly failed to pass through injury, and was held over in Regiment's training cadre pending physical recovery to try again. After several months with the Regiment's training cadre, he chose to abandon his application to join it, and left the British Army in December 1975.

After the army he worked on the family farm, but grew restless, and subsequently found employment using his military training as a mercenary soldier, with ex-members of the SAS, seeing service as an advisor to the Sri Lankan Army in counter-insurgency warfare in 1979, and in Afghanistan/Pakistan in the early 1980s with the United States Government's Defense Intelligence Agency, training the Afghan Mujahideen to fight the Soviet Union. During the 1980s–1990s he was involved in conflicts in the Balkans during the Bosnian War, South America and South Africa.

In the 1990s, Sessarego faked his own death while in Bosnia. He then appeared in a BBC Newsnight programme in November 2001 under the name Philip Stephenson.

== Jihad! (2000) ==
In 1999, with the assistance of ghost writer Adrian Weale, Sessarego (using the pen name "Tom Carew") wrote an account of his military experiences in the Soviet–Afghan War in which Britain had become covertly involved in; helping to support the Mujahideen. The book entitled Jihad! – The Secret War in Afghanistan, which was published in 2000, stating erroneously in its text that he had been in that theatre of operations as a trooper in the SAS. The book sold reasonably well, being serialized in The Sunday Times, with print-runs in several European countries, as well as Australia. A paperback edition was published in 2001.

The September 11 attacks in the United States, perpetrated by Islamist terrorists, created an immense demand for information on the nature and motivation of the attackers, which transferred into a surge in sales of Jihad! in excess of 50,000 copies, making it a best-seller with its author an in-demand figure in the British media for expert comment on Jihadism.

Journalists interviewing him regularly referred to his SAS trooper background in line with the book's text, which Sessarego played along with, until being exposed by BBC reporter George Eykyn, after the BBC had been contacted by a former member of the SAS, notifying it that Sessarego's claims in this regard were false. Sessarego was subsequently lured to the BBC in November 2001 on the pretence of an interview about Afghanistan, where on arrival he was aggressively evidentially confronted mid-interview by Eykyn accusing him of being an imposter, who had invented a non-existent career with the SAS. Breaking off the interview, Sessarego walked out of BBC Television Centre closely pursued to the entrance gate by Eykyn haranguing him with a television camera team in tow.

After the film of the confrontation was broadcast by the BBC's evening Newsnight show, Sessarego was generally ridiculed in the British media for being a "fantasist", calling into doubt not just his claims to have been a trooper in the SAS but the whole content of Jihad!. His publisher attempted to defend the book's validity by offering to remove a small part of its text that contained the erroneous claims regarding the Regiment. Weale, the book's ghostwriter, defending its content by ripping out one page of its text during an interview with the BBC, as an illustration of how little space had been taken up with the claims regarding the SAS. However, these efforts were not sufficient in stemming the media's condemnation, and the book was subsequently withdrawn from further sale. Sessarego withdrew from the media spotlight, his publishing/media career at an end.

== Later life and death ==
Sessarego subsequently was reported as living in Belgium in impoverished circumstances selling ex-Army surplus military materials and running "survival" training courses. He also worked in the harbour of Antwerp, when he did a variety of jobs and was known as "Phil the trooper".

In November 2008, Philip Sessarego's badly decomposed body was found in a rented Antwerp garage where he had been covertly living for several months. He was 55 years of age. The cause of death was conjectured to be from the effects of accidental carbon monoxide poisoning. His body was subsequently cremated, and its ashes buried in the graveyard of St. Martin's Church, in Hereford.

== Personal life ==
Sessarego married in 1977, the marriage producing his only daughter Claire and his first of three sons, Paul. He later had son Alexander by his second marriage to Virginia, and finally son Lucas was born to his partner Nicole. He had left Virginia whilst she was pregnant to start a life in Antwerp with Nicole and their son. A television documentary about his life and family relationships, entitled My Father the Mercenary, was produced in 2009.

== Publications ==
- Jihad! – The Secret War in Afghanistan. Edinburgh: Mainstream Publishing. 2001. ISBN 9781840183269.
