= National anthem of the Kingdom of Afghanistan =

National anthem of Afghanistan from 1943 to 1973

Loya Salāmi
English: Grand Salute
- درود بزرگ
- Former national anthem of Afghanistan
- Also known as: ای شاهِ غیور و مهربانِ ما
- Lyrics: Mohammed Mokhtar, 1943
- Music: Farukh Afandi, 1943
- Adopted: 1943; 83 years ago
- Relinquished: 1973; 53 years ago
- Preceded by: "Amani Anthem"
- Succeeded by: "Millī Surūd”

Audio sample
- "Grand Salute": file; help

The "Grand Salute" (Persian: درود بزرگ, lit. 'Dorud Bozorg'), also known by its incipit "Our Brave and Noble King" (Persian: ای شاهِ غیور و مهربانِ ما, romanized: Ay Šāh-i ǧayūr o mehrabān-i mā) was the national anthem of the Kingdom of Afghanistan from 1943 to 1973. The song was officially launched in 1943 and replaced the first national anthem, composed during the reign of Amanullah Khan. In 1973, the kingdom was overthrown in a coup d'état, and the song was also abolished.

== Lyrics ==
Persian (1943–1964); Dari lyrics

ای شاه غیور و مهربان ما
هستیم از جان مطیع شما
ما فرزندان توییم
ما فداکار توییم
ای شاه ما
ای شاه ما
ای شاه ملت‌خواه ما

Transliteration

Ay, Šāh-i ǧayūr u mehrabān-i mā
Hastīm az jān motī'-i šumā
Mā farzandān-i tūyīm!
Mā fidākār-i tūyīm.
Ay Šāh-i mā
Ay Šāh-i mā
Ay Šāh-i millat-xāh-i mā!

English translation

Our brave and noble King,
We are your obedient servants.
We are your children!
We are your devotees.
Oh, our King!
Oh, our King!
Oh, our King and comrade of the people!

== See also ==
- List of former national anthems
- National anthems of Afghanistan
- Music of Afghanistan
