= United Kingdom in the Soviet–Afghan War =

British involvement in Soviet-Afghan War

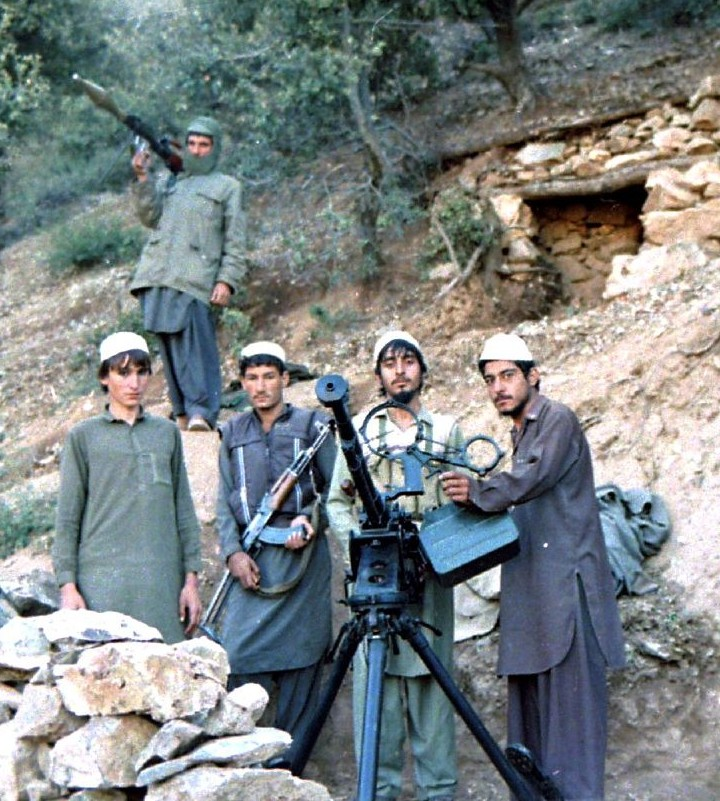
Jamiat-e-Islami guerrillas in the Shultan Valley in 1987. The organisation received covert British training, weapons and other forms of support during the Soviet–Afghan War.

Though not officially a belligerent during the Soviet–Afghan War, the United Kingdom was heavily involved, playing a key covert role in the conflict. Also known as the Second Great Game, the British provided both indirect and direct support for the Afghan mujahideen in their fight against the Soviet Union, including secretly arming, funding and supplying various factions. Britain's Secret Intelligence Service (MI6) primarily supported the Mujahideen group Jamiat-e Islami, commanded by Ahmad Shah Massoud who, having received little support from the US and Pakistan, became Britain's key ally in the conflict. Fighting in the Panjshir valley, Massoud and his fighters with British support and intelligence, overcame nine Soviet offensives and held out up to the Soviet withdrawal from the vital valley in 1986. Massoud became the most successful and feared of the Mujahideen commanders.

The British also played a vital role in support of the US government's Operation Cyclone, from which the latter provided far more in financial and material terms. Unlike the US which had to funnel its program through Pakistan, the UK played a more direct combat role in Afghanistan itself – in particular, using retired or seconded Special forces such as the Special Air Service and private military corporations to support the resistance groups in practical manners. One of Britain's greatest contributions was training the Mujahideen; not just in Afghanistan and Pakistan but also in the Gulf states and the UK itself.

The UK's role in the conflict entailed direct military involvement not only in Afghanistan but the Central Asian republics of the Soviet Union. By the war's end, Britain's support to the Afghan resistance turned out to be Whitehall's most extensive covert operation since the Second World War.

== Background ==
Britain had fought in Afghanistan in the nineteenth and twentieth centuries. British paranoia of Tsarist Russia's threat against British India – the so-called Great Game – brought Afghanistan into the fray. Britain intended to gain control over the Emirate of Afghanistan, and as a result, three major wars were fought there; the first in 1842 which ended in a humiliating withdrawal. The second was fought in 1879 which ended in British ally Abdur Rahman Khan being installed as puppet with the Durand Line being established by 1893. The third was fought in 1919 in which Afghanistan attempted to invade India. Although they were repelled, Afghanistan did secure independence but a new diplomatic mission was secured so that it could act as a buffer state between the British empire in India and the new Soviet empire. In effect, Britain controlled Afghanistan's foreign policy and paid the government to maintain stability. This lasted well into the 1940s until the independence of both Pakistan and India in 1947.

After the 1940s, Britain played a very little role in Afghan politics, and this opened the door for the Soviet Union's involvement. In the 1960s the new People's Democratic Party of Afghanistan (PDPA), a Marxist–Leninist political party was founded and supported by the Soviets. The PDPA, led by Mohammed Daoud Khan had taken power in the 1973 Afghan coup d'état by overthrowing the monarchy of King Zahir Shah. However Daoud Khan was overthrown six years later in the Saur revolution which took Moscow by surprise, who preferred that the pro-Soviet Daoud Khan stay in power.

Discontent fermented amongst the people of Afghanistan, and anti-government revolts in March, June and August took place after the revolution had ended. The Soviets were keen to get in and stabilise the country citing the Brezhnev Doctrine as a basis for their intervention. Brezhnev and other Soviet leaders believed that the West were behind the uprisings in Afghanistan in the context of the Cold War, and the rebellions were seen in Moscow as the first stage of an alleged Western plot to instigate rebellions or 'Jihad' in Soviet Central Asia where the majority of the population was Muslim. On Christmas Day 1979, the USSR began its military occupation of Afghanistan.

In May 1979, Margaret Thatcher became the British Prime Minister, and had a reputation for being firmly anti-Soviet. The nickname 'The Iron Lady' was first coined in an article in the Soviet military newspaper Red Star. British officials were concerned about the possibility that Moscow might subsequently exploit opportunities to destabilize fragile South Asian states to expand its influence within them. British concern was not with neighboring Pakistan, but the ongoing revolution in Iran and the potential hijack by the Iranian Communist Party – the Tudeh. Thatcher saw détente as a sham which enabled the Soviet bloc to wage the Cold War by other means, and professed in her memoirs that their intervention in Afghanistan came as no surprise.

== Britain's involvement ==
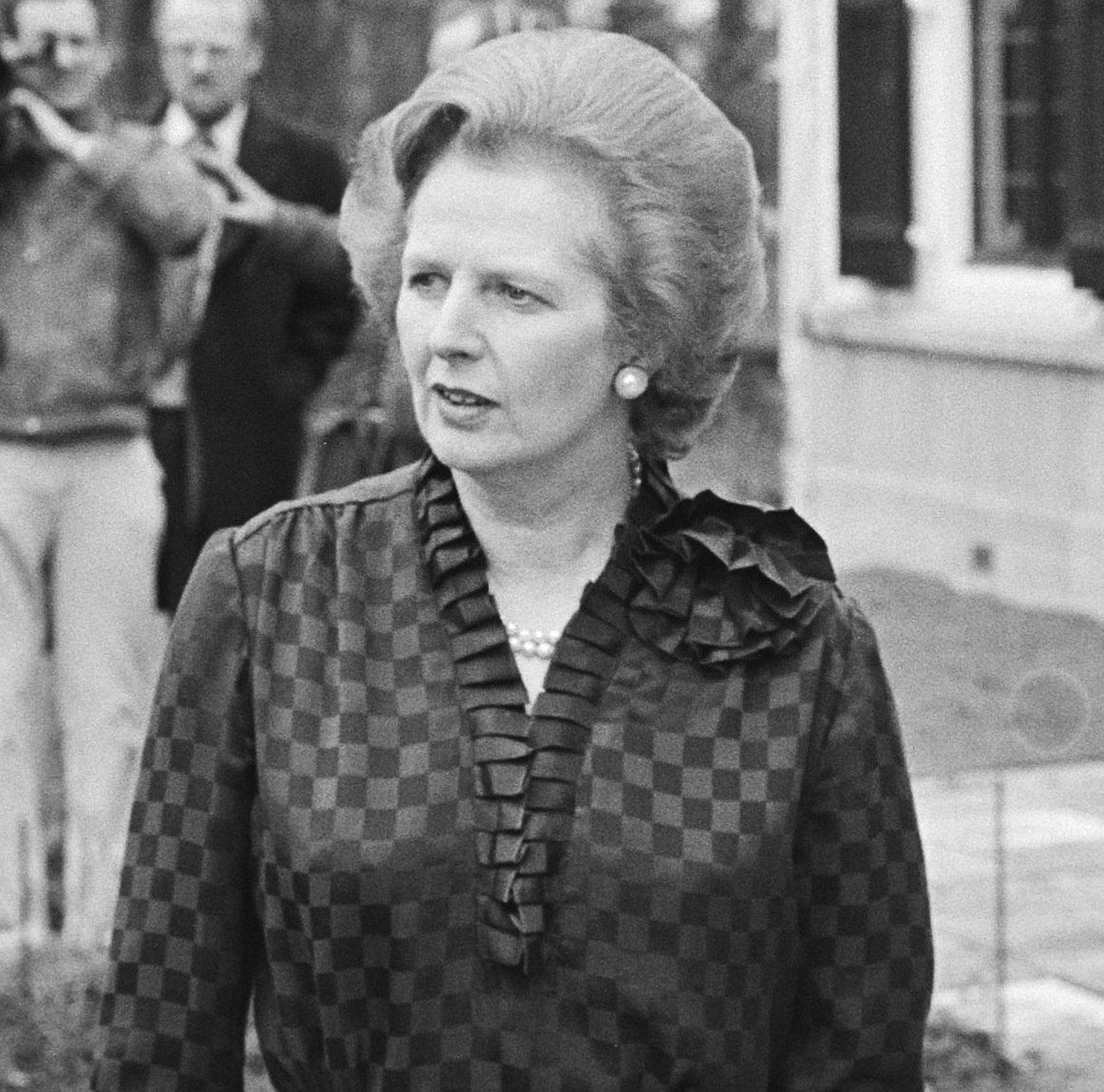
Prime Minister Margaret Thatcher in 1981 – nicknamed the 'Iron Lady' by the Soviet press for her anti-Soviet stance. She pushed for more direct involvement in Afghanistan.

Within three weeks of the Soviet invasion, the cabinet secretary, Robert Armstrong, was negotiating how to channel covert military aid towards the Islamic resistance fighting the Russians. Secretary of State Peter Carrington attempted to visit Moscow to try to persuade the leader of the Soviet Union Leonid Brezhnev to withdraw his troops from Afghanistan, but this proved fruitless when Soviet foreign minister Andrei Gromyko refused any meeting on the matter. Armstrong then sent a note to Thatcher, Carrington and "C" (Sir Colin Figures the head of MI6) arguing the case for military aid to "encourage and support resistance". Carrington then visited Pakistan on 17 January meeting with President Zia-ul-Haq touring the border and assuring them of support. A further meeting with West German, French and US representatives took place in London the following month. All looked to support the Mujahideen in some ways but not to provide direct aid – the French proposed channeling military aid via the Iraqis, but the West Germans were concerned about American intentions and the danger of a third world war. France agreed to provide some support, but only with the medical group Médecins Sans Frontières. Thatcher, on the other hand, wanted to wage a covert war even if it meant putting British troops on the ground. However any overt military action to counter the USSR was out of the question, not just because of the risks of escalation, but the severe limitations on the UK's military capabilities. The Conservative government wanted to focus Britain's armed forces on Europe, and the risks of conflict between NATO and the Warsaw Pact.

Thatcher had a long conversation with US President Jimmy Carter and both agreed to give as much assistance to the Afghan rebels. She also enthusiastically backed Carter's tough stance towards the Soviets, but did not go as far as boycotting the Moscow Olympic Games which the US had done.

Support for the Afghan resistance was approved by the British government who then authorized MI6 to conduct operations within the first year of the Soviet occupation. This was to be coordinated by MI6 officers in Islamabad in liaison with the CIA and Pakistan's ISI. Carrington was also eager to get 'scenes of Afghans fighting communists onto television screens' hoping for a televised style war like Vietnam.

Thatcher discussed British military aid with Pakistan's foreign minister Agha Shahi in June 1980 and welcomed Zia-ul-Haq in a state visit four months later. Following this Thatcher then visited Pakistan in October 1981 and met Haq again, on a state visit. She was flown by helicopter to the Nasir Bagh refugee camp, where 12,000 people were staying close to the Afghan border. Thatcher toured the refugee camp and then told a gathering of Afghan elders that her Government would continue to press Moscow to withdraw its troops from their homeland. She then gave a speech telling them that the hearts of the free world were with them, and promised aid. Thatcher then went to the Khyber Pass inspected some captured Soviet weapons, briefly crossed the border shaking hands with an Afghan Soldier, before flying back to Islamabad for a state banquet. The Kremlin on the other hand responded to the whole visit by critiquing Thatcher's "provocation aimed at stirring up anti-Soviet hysteria."

=== Ahmad Shah Massoud ===
MI6 sought to find the faction that they could support – after approval for operations the first move was in February 1980 just two months after the Soviet invasion, MI6 officers led by the Far East's Controller Gerry Warner met tribal leaders in the Pakistan border area within a school to offer help and support if necessary. Warner then briefed an officer to find a Napoleon-style Afghan commander. Examinations from reports in the field and intercepted Soviet communications were filtered through – at first it was thought that helping the Mujahideen in the Helmand Province was a feasible option. However, attention was soon turned to one of the factions that, in the view of the British, were the ones giving the Soviets a bloody nose – the Jamiat-e Islami. Led by political leader Burhanuddin Rabbani, this was one of the most powerful of the Afghan mujahideen groups – Rabbani's commander was Ahmad Shah Massoud, a young Tajik commander in the Panjshir Valley. This area had within it 150,000 people, in a fertile river valley but it also had strategic areas, such as the Salang Pass, the supply route for the Soviet 40th Army and was only fifty miles North East of Kabul. Here Massoud's men ambushed Soviet and Afghan communist convoys travelling through the pass, causing fuel shortages in Kabul.

There was the issue that Massoud's faction were mostly Tajiks and Pakistan only supported the hardline Islamic Pushtuns tribes. Despite this however the British sent out a team to meet Massoud – posing as journalists, they met Massoud's British-educated brother Ahmad Wali Massoud in a Peshawar hotel. They then set off crossing the border into Afghanistan where they came under fire from the Soviets or their Afghan allies before they eventually met Massoud. The meeting was a success – the British gave a large sum of money to Massoud and asked what he needed. He said he had enough weapons, much of it captured from the Russians and their allies but what he needed was expert military training, radios and other high-tech supplies. The British agreed to support Massoud despite the challenges of the Pakistanis, and to set up an operation to fund, supply and train Massoud's forces.

=== MI6's battleground – the Panjshir Valley ===
Fighting in the Panjshir valley became the Soviet Union's major focus for offensives in Afghanistan.

Through MI6, Massoud accepted an annual mission of two of their officers as well as military instructors (a total of five to eight men) for him and his fighters. These men were composed of special forces – SAS and SBS. As it was considered too dangerous for serving British soldiers to travel in the country they were 'de-badged' and then seconded to SIS under false identification. There were also contract labourers who had to be trained in intelligence techniques and were provided military instructions by MI6 personnel so that these men had to handle the dangerous cross-border operations from Pakistan. Altogether these men were known colloquially as the 'increment' or the Revolutionary Warfare Wing (RWW). The first of these arrived in the summer of 1981, having made the difficult two-week journey walking North of the Pakistan border into Nuristan, over the Hindu Kush mountains and finally into the valley itself at a secret location. They went so far as much as to look and dress like the mujahideen wearing the Shalwar kameez and stayed for three weeks or more in the Panjshir mountains using caves for shelter and cover, where a small base was established.

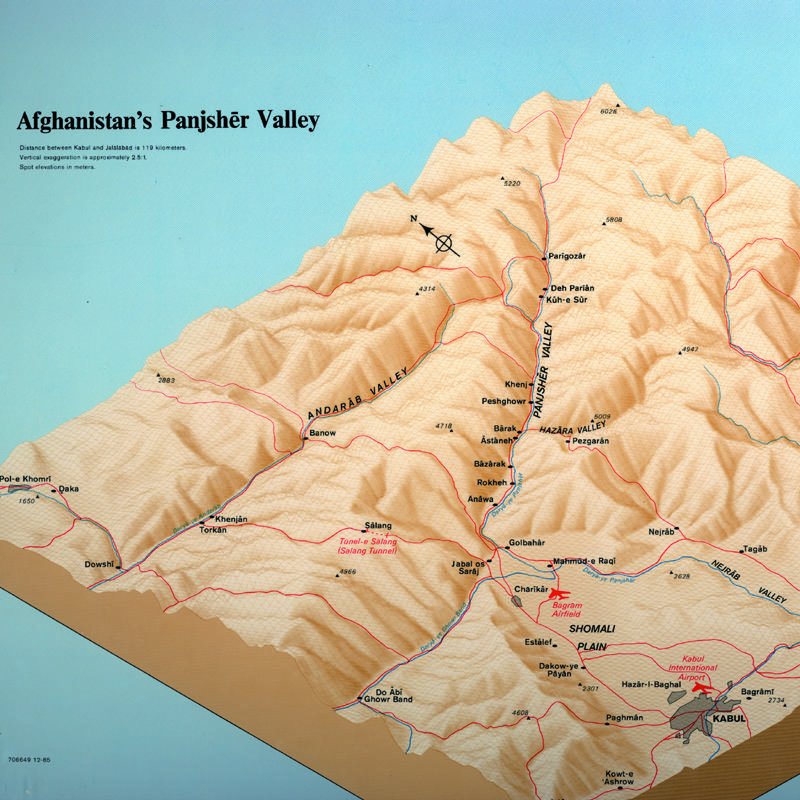
Map of the Panjsher Valley where MI6 operatives stayed in support of Ahmad Shah Massoud

Obtaining supplies in the first year proved difficult however, as the Soviets and their allies began to mine the route between them and Pakistan. Finding Afghans willing to drive supplies to them proved difficult but mine detectors were brought in, which eased the situation. By the end of the following year they were then able to move supplies to Massoud, which now included high tech equipment; laser binoculars and night vision goggles. Lethal arms were also procured which included silenced sniper rifles and mortars. This would carry on over the next few years, all being done under the noses of the Pakistanis, who were unaware of the operations.

MI6 team's most important contribution to Massoud and his fighters was helping with organization and communications via radio. Several of these tactical radios made by British firm Racal were supplied in early 1982 to the Panjshir. The radio system was the Jaguar high frequency hopping network and computers, which not only intended to prevent Soviet eavesdropping, but were also exceptionally useful for Massoud to coordinate his forces. The team taught English to Massoud's aides (one of which was Abdullah Anas) so they could better use the radios. By 1986 a full system had been established after training had been completed.

Added to this was intelligence – Cheltenham-based GCHQ intercepted and translated Soviet battle plan communications. This was then relayed to the MI6 teams, who had with them equipment such as the American-made AN/URS11 remote controlled signals intelligence transceiver and Satellite phones. From the intercepted Soviet intelligence MI6 was able to adjust mujahid training accordingly. During the Soviet Panjshir VII offensive, which would be one of the largest of the war, the radios and British intelligence combined had warned Massoud. This gave him details of the 11,000 Soviet and 2,600 Afghan soldiers, under Marshal of the Soviet Union Sergei Sokolov, supported by 200 aircraft and 190 helicopters assaulting the valley. These details saved Massoud and his men's lives, and despite the losses during the offensive they survived the huge onslaught. Through the following offensives (Panjshir VIII and IX) as well, MI6 was providing him with more than just secure communications.

The operatives also helped to retrieve abandoned or destroyed Soviet equipment including crashed Soviet helicopters, one of which was a downed Mil Mi-24 Hind. The operatives were able to take the most important parts of the helicopter, carrying them out on mules. From there they were successfully brought across the border into Pakistan, where they were field-tested or boxed up to be sent back to the UK for study.

In line with Carrington's wish for a 'televised war' MI6's training and operational efforts doubled as a sideshow providing the international coverage of Massoud's fight against the Soviets in the Panjshir. In an untried method MI6 intended to film any atrocities they came across or any victories that the Mujahideen had won. MI6 then recruited journalists who were then trained for the role of Britain's psychological operations in Afghanistan. These were more experimental, having to find suitable cameramen among the mujahideen groups in Peshawar or sometimes crossing the border with them to reinforce their journalistic cover as freelance foreign correspondents. Footage that came out of Afghanistan initially were of poor quality, and MI6 sought to improve this, so therefore the camera of choice was a Super 8mm film camera. One of the journalists was Sandy Gall who had been recruited by MI6 for this reason, and went into Afghanistan in 1982. He built up a good friendship with Massoud and his aides. Later that year Gall and his team managed to send back footage successfully during the Soviet Panjshir IV offensive. This was transmitted on 23 November for an evening ITN News bulletin. Gall however was always kept away from the other MI6 operatives.

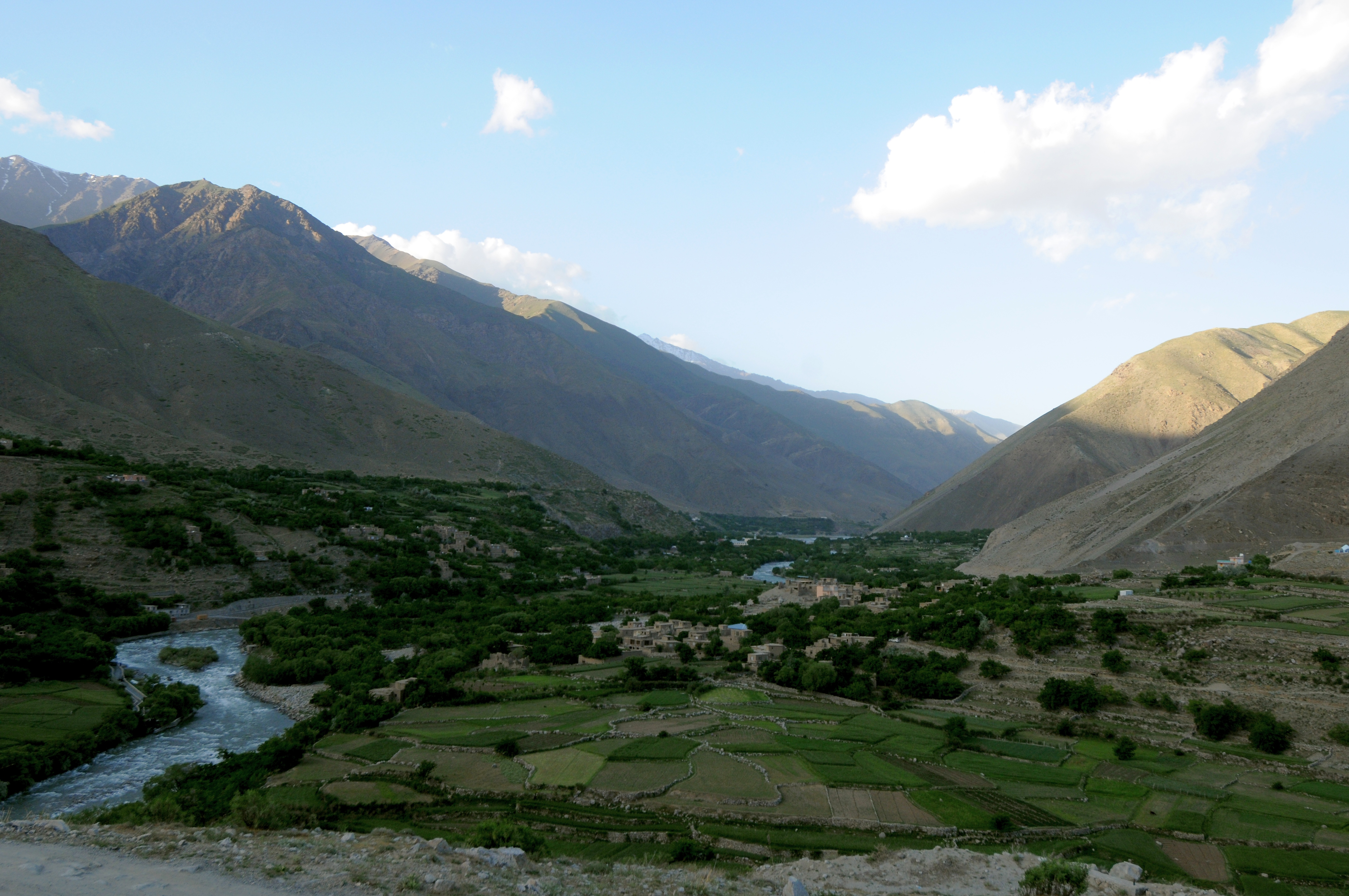
Panjshir valley as it is today

The operatives always saw front-line action assisting Massoud's men mostly using silencer rifles. They witnessed the interrogation of Russian prisoners and assisted in directing mortar fire. At one point three operatives and their Afghan escorts were lured into a Soviet helicopter ambush – they only escaped when an Afghan officer lured the helicopter away sacrificing his life so they could escape. If the British were identified by the Soviets in a clash, a cover story was in place in case such an incident occurred. MI6 operations soon began to attract Soviet attention; on 1 July 1983 British operatives in the Panjshir had been warned by Massoud himself, that the Russians were about to descend on their position. All the operatives immediately attempted to head back to Pakistan in a convoy which included a number of French medical doctors. Eventually, this led to a clash not far from Bagram airbase by Soviet and Afghan DPRA troops supported by helicopter gunships. All six of the Britons just about managed to escape alive – one suffering from severe exhaustion and having to be carried back. The Russians who had been tipped off failed to capture them but recovered a body (in fact Mujahideen horseman) along with a miniature satellite dish, a transmitter and a computerised keyboard. Also recovered was a British passport which belonged to a 'Stuart Bodman' purporting to be a journalist working for Gulf Features Service. The equipment and the body were identified and paraded at a Kabul Press conference to the world; the Russians accused the British of meddling with terrorists. The Foreign office denied any knowledge of who he was and remained tight-lipped. Over the next few days after the broadcast, the British press sought to find details about Stuart Bodman, but was then tracked down by journalists from the Sunday Times to be alive and well in Surrey. It was assumed that the passport was a stolen identity and led to speculation that there was a cover-up. It was not realised at the time that Gulf Features Service was a front organisation that provided a journalistic cover and that Bodman's false name allowed the British government to deny any knowledge of his existence.

Another incident involved an ex-SAS operative; Andy Skrzypkowiak who was working as a BBC cameraman with Massoud's men. Known as 'the Pole' (due to his Polish background) and brought out rare images of Massoud's guerrilla attacks against the Soviets. In October 1987 on his way back from the Panjshir he was killed by the CIA backed Hezb-e-Islami fighters led by Gulbuddin Hekmatyar as punishment for 'bringing war footage of Massoud's military victories to the West'. Skrzypkowiak's killers were not found and Hekmatyar even rewarded them, such was the interfactional rivalry at the time. Britain's response was muted over the death of Skrzypkowiak even though they had concerns about how brutal and extremist Hekmatyar was.

=== Supporting Operation Cyclone ===
America's Operation Cyclone which was the CIA's program to arm and finance the Afghan mujahideen began in 1981 – the first US aid package worth $3.2 billion. Britain would play a vital role in the program in many ways. MI6 reactivated their long-established networks of contacts in Pakistan which they relayed to the CIA. The two most prominent were the Mahz-i-Milli Islam (National Islamic Front of Afghanistan) led by a former senior officer in the Royal Afghan army, Brigadier General Rahmatullah Safi's Mahz-i-Milli Islam group, and Gulbuddin Hekmatyar's group Hezb-e-Islami – both introduced to the CIA in the same year.

Zbigniew Brzezinski, the US national security adviser, recommended providing Afghan fighters in "forward positions" just inside the Pakistan border with "surface to air missiles to defend themselves against air attack". The CIA had tied their hands by striking a deal with Pakistan's ISI under which the Americans were not able to conduct unilateral operations against the Soviets inside Afghanistan. This also meant that they were only able to supply to Hekmatyar's Hezb-e-Islami. As a result, they had to rely heavily on MI6 using it as a proxy to carry out operations that were deemed too secret to involve the Pakistanis. The difference being – the CIA was restricted to extreme secrecy whereas MI6 were not. The Ministry of Defence with their state censorship DSMA-Notice were able to keep away any facts from the British public.

In late 1983 the head of the CIA's Afghanistan operation, Gust Avrakotos met with some MI6 agents in London, one of whom had just returned from three months inside the warzone. Avrakotos questioned Massoud's truce with the Soviets but he got a better understanding of the situation with British intelligence and reports from the field. He realized MI6's budget cuts led them short on delivering vital supplies. Avrakotos also concluded that funding MI6 independently had to be done secretly under the noses of other CIA officials, as well as the Pakistanis. From him money was poured into MI6, increasing their expenditure tenfold and allowing them to carry out further operations. Through Avrakotos the CIA used MI6 operatives to set up listening devices near Russian bases such as at Bagram. These teams were sent throughout the war to track the movements of Soviet tanks and aircraft.

MI6's base of operation was in Islamabad – where everything was organized for Britain's covert war against the Soviet Union. In charge there was Anthony Hawkes, who from 1984 until 1988 ran operations. Assisting the CIA and ISI in Islamabad was MI6 officer Alastair Crooke who coordinated the assistance of training and supplies to Abdul Haq. The latter would become an intermediary for the CIA, MI6 and the Kabul front. Haq's office in Peshawar became the organizing centre of resistance with MI6 and CIA operatives assisting – most of the time they supplied him with maps of new targets they wanted Haq to hit. Intelligence from GCHQ was also relayed to the CIA and ISI who were helping with their respective Mujahideen groups.

There were however some differences between America and the UK during the war. There was also a focus on Massoud who would be the subject of criticism from China, Pakistan, Saudi Arabia as well as the CIA, due mostly to his truce with the Soviets and their Afghan counterparts which took place in 1983. With Pakistan unwilling to assist Massoud as he was a Tajik the US had to follow suit. The British role was particularly resented by the Pakistanis, who accused Massoud of an unwillingness to fight, but the truce was a tactical move so that he was able to regroup his forces, as his supplies were running critically low. Despite the CIA's doubts on Massoud, MI6 pursued an act to support him regardless.

With Pakistan and the US working together, British intelligence believed that "the CIA was being too alarmist about the Soviet threat to Pakistan." Some British officers thought that backing militant Islamic groups such as that of Hekmatyar was dangerous, particularly in the wake of the death of Andy Skrzypkowiak. The Americans on the other hand still had suspicions about Britain's role in Afghanistan – they had assumed that they were trying to do as much as 'stay in the game' and that the 'Brits' had an agenda that America was trying to take the lead in their 'old back yard'.

=== Arms and supplies ===
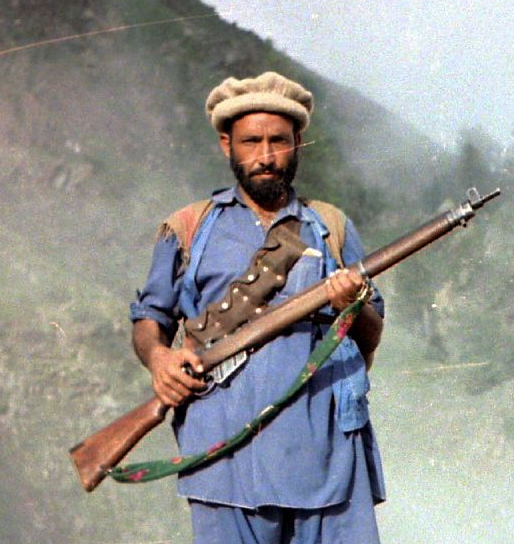
An Afghan mujahid carries a Lee–Enfield No. 4 in August 1985

From the start of the war the mujahideen were sent hundreds of thousands of old British army small arms, mostly Lee Enfield rifles, some of which were purchased from old Indian Army stocks. MI6 also sent nearly half a million rounds for rifles even though they from the army reserve supplies. These weapons proved highly popular amongst the Afghan resistance groups, they were accurate and could penetrate Soviet flak jackets that a Kalashnikov rifle could not.

In the Spring of 1986, Whitehall sent weapons clandestinely to some units of the Mujahideen, and made sure their origins were open to speculation. The most notable of these was the Blowpipe missile launchers which had proved to be a failure in the Falklands War and had been mothballed by the British army, but were available on the international arms market. Around fifty launchers and 300 Missiles were sent from the Short factory in Belfast and were mostly given to Haq's Hezb-e-Islami as they were easy to get through from Pakistan to Afghanistan between 1985 and 1986. British personnel then trained the Mujahideen on the missile, but the system nevertheless proved ineffective; thirteen missiles were fired for no hits.

With the failure of the Blowpipe missile, the American FIM-92 Stinger was chosen which was also sent clandestinely. The CIA eventually supplied nearly 500 Stingers (some sources claim 1,500–2,000) to the Mujahideen in Afghanistan and 250 launchers. American personnel however were not able to train the Mujahideen, so instead, they were trained by the Pakistani ISI and a few SAS (some of whom had used the weapon in the Falklands War). The Stingers however were not able to intercept the high-flying Soviet jets. ISI however made sure that Massoud's forces received none of the Stingers, even though eight (a fraction of 1% of the total) were smuggled in. The impact of the Stinger on the outcome of the war is contested, particularly in the translation between the impact on the tactical battlefield to the strategic level withdrawal, and the influence the first had on the second.

=== Training ===
Britain's biggest contribution to the war by far was training the Mujahideen fighters. From Islamabad MI6 coordinated a multitude of private security and mercenary firms much of which was contracted out to the British Army. These were monitored by Scotland Yard's Special Branch and MI5, and given the go-ahead by the Foreign Office. These firms would directly train Afghan forces; the main company was Keenie Meenie Services (KMS Ltd) which was led by former SAS officers. The training was done in a pyramid structure with the SAS, KMS and MI6. This was done through Saladin Security, a KMS subsidiary. They would end up training the leaders of seven large brigades. Some of this training took place before the Soviet invasion was launched – the support going to the Mahz-i-Milli Islam led by Rahmatullah Safi who lived in England after the Soviet invasion. He and his officers were trained by MI6 and would return a year later based in Peshawar, and operated in Paktia and Kunar provinces. They would later take part in the 1986 Zhawar fighting.

The Special Air Service themselves were sent to Pakistan in 1983 and worked alongside US special forces in training Pakistan's SSG commandos. They would then guide guerrilla operations in Afghanistan in the hope officers could impart their learned expertise directly to the Afghans. They taught the Mujahideen how to shoot down Russian helicopters.

For Massoud's men, the Jamiat e-Islami, it was different, due to Pakistan's hostility they had to take them out of Pakistan and be trained elsewhere. Massoud stated that his men needed battlefield organisation skills and so picked out the best of his junior commanders to be trained by the British. Here KMS was involved and they organized flights to be sent out to secret MI6 and CIA bases in Oman and Saudi Arabia to train. There the Afghan commanders were trained in sabotage, reconnaissance, attack planning, arson, and how to use explosive devices and heavy artillery, such as mortars. The next stage was how to attack aircraft and lay anti-aircraft and anti-armour ambushes.

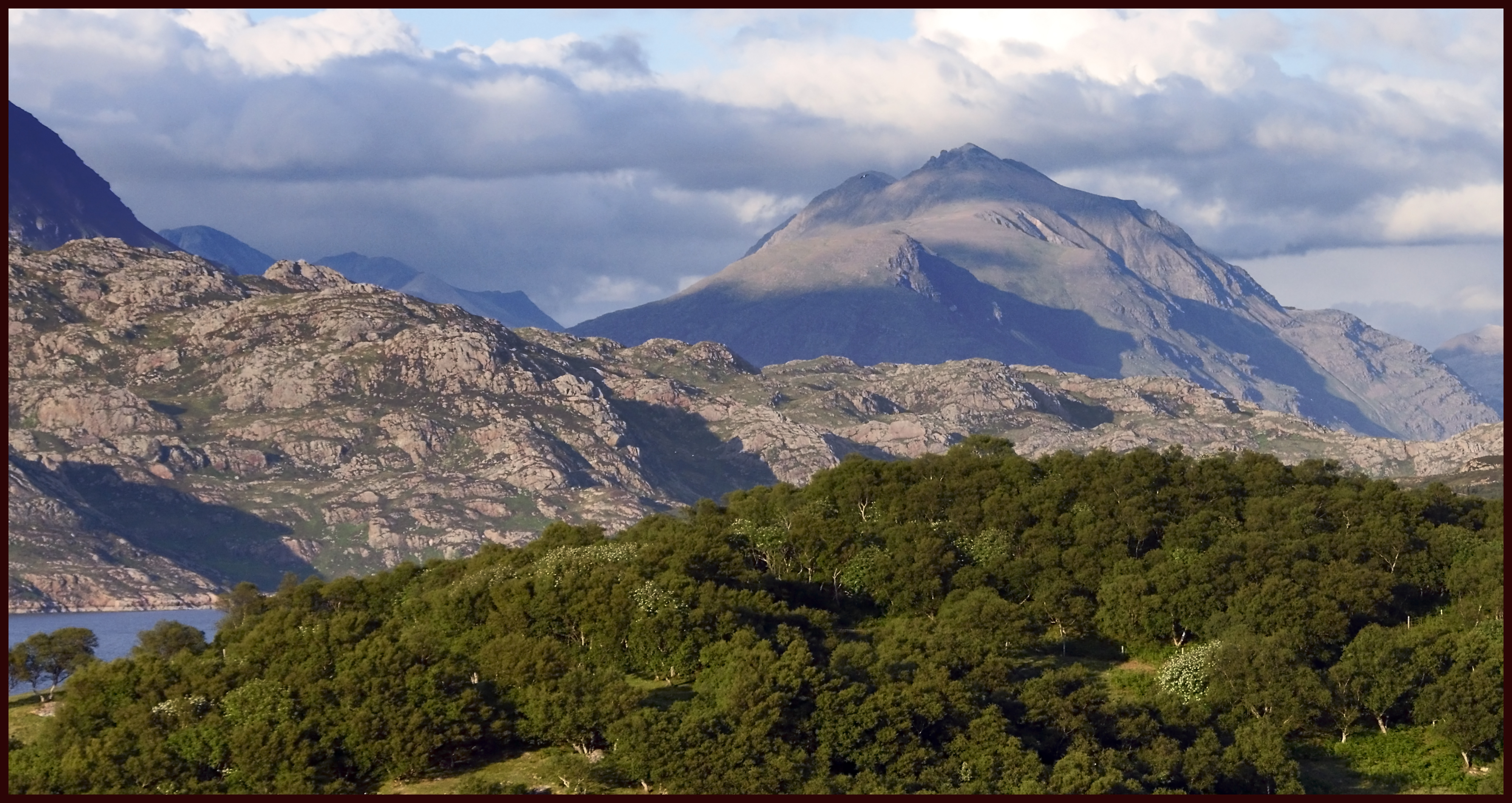
Applecross Peninsula in Scotland where Afghan Mujahideen were trained by Britain's SAS

KMS even organised the commanders to be sent to Britain – the training camps there were set up in late 1983. Disguised as tourists, the selected Mujahideen commanders were trained in three-week cycles in Scotland, northern and southern England on SAS training grounds, living in old barns. One of the camps was in the mountains surrounding the Criffel in Dumfries, while the other was in the remote Applecross peninsula in the West Highlands. Amongst the training involved was heavy weapons on islands off Western Scotland. The Mujahideen soldiers were shuttled between the UK and Pakistan by an RAF C-130 operated by the RAF 'S&D' flight, a small cadre of RAF special forces pilots that support MI6 and the SAS. Once back in Afghanistan the commanders passed on the training to the insurgents themselves. Some KMS personnel even performed scouting parties and backup roles for the front-line insurgents. Members of KMS and MI6 operatives also brought together rival Mujahideen groups that had previous blood feuds, to stitch together more effective alliances. The training delivered great dividends for Massoud and his fighters which lead to the destruction of hundreds of Soviet vehicles and tanks.

=== Into the Soviet Republics ===
The UK's role in the conflict entailed direct military involvement not only in Afghanistan but the Central Asian republics of the Soviet Union. From 1984 in conjunction with the CIA and ISI, MI6 helped organize and execute "scores" of guerrilla-style attacks. These included rocket attacks on villages in Tajikistan and raids on Soviet airfields, troop supplies and convoys in Uzbekistan which flowed through these areas, some 25 kilometers in these territories.

These were the first direct Western attacks on the Soviet Union since the 1950s and they reached their peak in 1986. MI6 directly remitted money into an account of Pakistani leader of Jamaat-e-Islami Qazi Hussain Ahmad who had close links with Hekmatyar & Massoud. MI6's aim was for Ahmad to spread radical and anti-Soviet Islamic literature in the Soviet republics in the hope of rebellions against their Communist governments. These went as far as Chechnya and Bosnia. The uprisings did not occur but the Soviets were concerned about potential uprisings during the war and even threatened retaliation with bombings in Pakistan.

Pakistan's ISI requested limpet mines from Britain in the hope of attacking Soviet transport barges on the South bank of the Amu Darya River. MI6 facilitated the attacks which included the Limpets. In this they were successful in destroying a number of barges as well as damaging the bridge pylons spanning the river near Termez.

=== End of support ===
There would be nine Soviet directed offensives in the Panjshir valley in total. The last, 'Panjshir IX' ended in 1985, and the Soviets withdrew from the area the following year. The offensives were a failure overall - with each one either repelled, or after a Soviet withdrawal, Massoud's forces would then retake it. Massoud thus became known as the 'Lion of Panjshir'.

By the time the new Soviet Premier Mikhail Gorbachev came to power in 1985, he was looking for a way to disengage from Afghanistan. Newspaper reports linking Britain with the supply and training of weapons to the Mujahideen led to Soviet anger. Gorbachev put to Margaret Thatcher that there would be a solution if Britain stopped supplying and training the rebels. Thatcher did neither, and denied any British involvement, and only in Parliament did she state that diplomatic solutions were the answer to the end of the war. She was still however vocally supporting the Mujahideen in the same year and even met with Gulbuddin Hekmatyar and Abdul Haq in Downing Street.

Towards the end of the war, Britain was virtually running its own version of Operation Cyclone. On 20 July 1987, Mikhail Gorbachev announced the withdrawal of Soviet troops from Afghanistan. This was pursuant to the negotiations that led to the Geneva Accords of 1988. As a result, from 1987, British support to the Mujahideen began to wind down and only ended when the last Soviets had left on 15 February 1989.

== Consequences ==
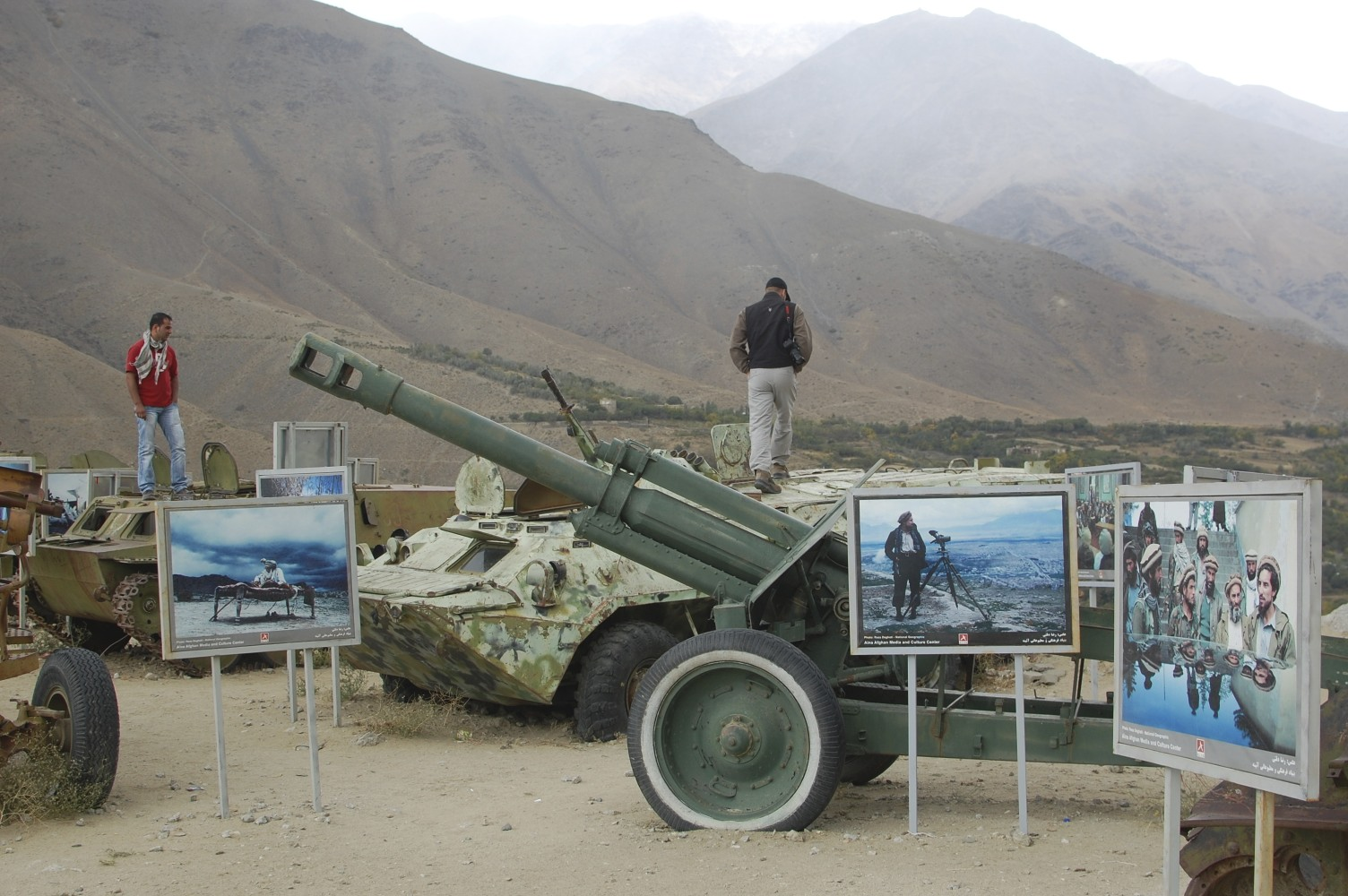
Abandoned Soviet equipment in the Panjshir Valley, with images of Ahmad Shah Massoud

Britain's role in the war was the most extensive covert operation their government had implemented since the Second World War. MI6's overall contribution is not known as much remains classified. The support from Britain as well as the US, Pakistan, Saudi Arabia and China all assisted in forcing a Soviet withdrawal. The help the British gave Massoud was critical to his fight which led to the Soviet failure to capture and consolidate the Panjshir and even Massoud himself. His men were still using the British-supplied radios well into the nineties. One British official claimed that the intelligence and communications that Massoud was given were 'worth over a hundred planeloads of armalites or Stingers'.

After the Soviet withdrawal, CIA and MI6 officers in Pakistan prepared for what happened next. MI6 was still supportive of Massoud, while the CIA still hoped Heketmayer would be the ideal choice to lead an anti-communist government. The British also wanted the United Nations to push for a compromise peace between the factions but the CIA wanted to push on. However, after the Soviet withdrawal Massoud would soon become the biggest winner; after the Communists had been defeated he and his factions not only controlled the Panjshir valley but several provinces in North East Afghanistan. Infighting between rival Mujahideen groups began in April 1992 which led to the 'War over Kabul'. Massoud forced Hekmatyar out of Kabul which led to Peshawar Accord. After the latter had lost control, American interest in Afghanistan waned and they withdrew all support, shutting down Operation Cyclone later that year. Infighting continued however and the next stage was another civil war which resulted in a new faction the Taliban taking over in 1996. After this followed yet another civil war, Massoud's Northern Alliance fighting a defensive war against the Taliban. Massoud however was assassinated on 9 September 2001, just two days before the September 11 attacks which ultimately led to NATO's twenty-year involvement. Abdul Haq was killed a month later on 26 October after he was captured by the Taliban along with nineteen others.

In the subsequent aftermath of 9/11 there was controversy with the fact that Britain had been involved in training and arming the Mujahideen, and from which some officers went on to command senior positions in the Taliban and Al Qaeda and also helped shelter Bin Laden. There was also the issue of the many hundreds of Blowpipe launchers and missiles being found in Taliban hands, some being unearthed as late as 2005. The US had launched an even bigger $10 million campaign Operation MIAS to buy back the Stinger missiles from the Mujahideen but this failed. Most of the British trained Mujahideen however were loyal to Massoud and continued to fight with the Northern alliance against the Taliban. Most of the blame lay on the US after they had given Hekmatyar's group (who Osama bin Laden served under) $600 million during the conflict. Hekmatyar himself would occasionally give support to Al Qaeda and the Taliban and the US subsequently put him on its designated terrorist list in 2003. Hekmatyar would even organise attacks on NATO troops. Although Britain had provided little support to Hekmatyar during the war, Whitehall officials had met with him twice in the 1980s, including Thatcher.

Since its establishment of the 'increment' during the war MI6 continued to use this in the 1990s with both SAS and SBS providing small detachments. Coordination and tasking would be routed through a fourth ministry of defense adviser typically an SAS officer with the rank of Lieutenant Colonel designated MODA/SO who joined other Ministry of Defense Advisers in the Secretariat.

The war itself had had the bonus for the British getting their hands on or the ability to study and acquire knowledge of a large range of Soviet equipment – this being from the latest AK-74 rifle series, tanks to avionics in helicopters. These would prove useful in the coming First Gulf War – the Iraqis using mostly bought Soviet equipment. The British were able to pass on the knowledge to their allies and both were able to know what they were up against in terms of firepower and equipment.

== Legacy ==
Philip Sessarego (using the pen name "Tom Carew") a former soldier wrote an account of his military experiences in the Soviet–Afghan War entitled Jihad! – The Secret War in Afghanistan, which was published in 2000. Although he was part of a team that went to Afghanistan to train the Mujahedeen, his claims about being in the SAS, were proved false however during a BBC investigation, and the book was subsequently withdrawn.

Scottish journalist and author John Fullerton who was a 'contract labourer' for MI6, in the role of head agent on the Afghan-Pakistan frontier during the war – used his experience which formed the novel Spy Game.

== See also ==
- United Kingdom in the Korean War

== Bibliography ==
- Amstutz, J Bruce (1994). Afghanistan The First Five Years of Soviet Occupation. Diane Publishing Company. ISBN 9780788111112. OCLC 948347893.
- Braithwaite, Rodric (2011). Afgantsy: The Russians in Afghanistan 1979–1989. New York: Oxford University Press. ISBN 978-0-19-983265-1. OCLC 751995302.
- Coles, T. J (2018). Manufacturing Terrorism: When Governments Use Fear to Justify Foreign Wars and Control Society. West Hoathly, W. Sussex: Clairview Books. ISBN 9781905570973. OCLC 1076248472.
- Coll, Steve (2004). Ghost Wars: The Secret History of the CIA, Afghanistan, and Bin Laden, from the Soviet Invasion to September 10, 2001. New York: Penguin Group. ISBN 9781594200076. OCLC 52814066.
- Cooley, John K (2002). Unholy Wars Afghanistan, America and International Terrorism (3rd ed.). London: Pluto Press. ISBN 978-1-84964-177-7. OCLC 656249884.
- Connor, Ken (2002). Ghost Force The Secret History of the SAS. London: Cassell Military. ISBN 9780304363674. OCLC 48571620.
- Corbin, Jane (2002). The Base In Search of Al-Qaeda, the Terror Network that Shook the World. London: Simon and Schuster. ISBN 9780743230735. OCLC 59497864.
- Cormac, Rory (2018). Disrupt and Deny: Spies, Special Forces, and the Secret Pursuit of British Foreign Policy. Oxford University Press. pp. 235–36. ISBN 978-0-19-878459-3.
- Crile, George (2003). Charlie Wilson's War The Story of the Largest Covert Operation in History: The Arming of the Mujahideen by the CIA. New York: Grove Press. ISBN 978-0-8021-6508-4. OCLC 298484907.
- Curtis, Mark (2010). Secret Affairs: Britain's Collusion with Radical Islam. London: Serpent's Tail. ISBN 978-1-84668-763-1. OCLC 655641314.
- Corera, Gordon (2011). The Art of Betrayal Life and Death in the British Secret Service. Orion. ISBN 9780297861010.
- Davidson, Christopher (2016). Shadow Wars: The Secret Struggle for the Middle East. London: Simon and Schuster. ISBN 978-1-78607-001-2. OCLC 959909516.
- Davies, Philip (2004). MI6 and the Machinery of Spying Structure and Process in Britain's Secret Intelligence. Portland, Or.: Taylor & Francis. ISBN 978-0-203-50372-0. OCLC 1086490160.
- Dorril, Stephen (2002). MI6: Inside the Covert World of Her Majesty's Secret Intelligence Service. Simon and Schuster. ISBN 978-0-7432-1778-1.
- Ferris, John (2021). Behind the Enigma The Authorised History of GCHQ, Britain's Secret Cyber-Intelligence Agency. Bloomsbury Publishing Plc. ISBN 9781526605481. OCLC 1193114956.
- Galeotti, Mark (2021). The Panjshir Valley 1980–86 The Lion Tames the Bear in Afghanistan. Oxford: Osprey. ISBN 9781472844736. OCLC 1125989301.
- Gall, Sandy (2021). Afghan Napoleon: The Life of Ahmad Shah Massoud. Haus Publishing. ISBN 9781913368647. OCLC 1309960914.
- Geraghty, Tony (2009). Soldiers of Fortune. New York: Pegasus Books. ISBN 978-1-60598-048-5. OCLC 286439437.
- Hughes, Geraint (2026). "Britain's Cold War Strategy and the Soviet Intervention in Afghanistan". Journal of Cold War Studies. 28 (1): 4–37. doi:10.1162/JCWS.a.1297.
- Hyman, Anthony (2016). Afghanistan Under Soviet Domination, 1964–91. Basingstoke: Palgrave Macmillan UK. ISBN 978-1-349-21948-3. OCLC 1256689628.
- Jelavich, Barbara (1974). St. Petersburg and Moscow : Tsarist and Soviet foreign policy, 1814-1974. Bloomington: Indiana University Press. pp. 200–201. ISBN 0-253-35050-6. OCLC 796911.
- Johnson, Robert (2011). The Afghan Way of War How and Why They Fight. New York: Oxford University Press. ISBN 978-0-19-979856-8. OCLC 713186739.
- Kerbaj, Richard (2022). The Secret History of the Five Eyes The Untold Story of the Shadowy International Spy Network, Through Its Targets, Traitors and Spies. London: Blink Publishing. ISBN 978-1-78946-556-3. OCLC 1343210299.
- McKercher, B. J. C (2017). Britain, America, and the Special Relationship Since 1941 Seminar studies in history. Taylor & Francis. ISBN 9781351776325.
- Riedel, Bruce (2014). What We Won America's Secret War in Afghanistan, 1979-89. Washington, D.C.: Brookings Institution Press. ISBN 978-0-8157-2585-5. OCLC 881029965.
- Sareen, Sushant (2005). The Jihad Factory Pakistan's Islamic Revolution in the Making. New Delhi: Observer Research Foundation in association with Har-Anand Publications. ISBN 9788124110751. OCLC 62517115.
- Smith, Michael (2003). The Spying Game: The Secret History of British Espionage. London: Politico's. ISBN 9781842750049. OCLC 59390846.
- Smith, Michael (2011). Killer Elite: America's Most Secret Soldiers Front Cover. Hachette UK. ISBN 9781908059062.
- Smith, Michael (2022). The Real Special Relationship The True Story of How the British and US Secret Services Work Together. London: Simon & Schuster. ISBN 978-1-4711-8680-6. OCLC 1336402588.
- Weir, William (2008). Guerrilla Warfare Irregular Warfare in the Twentieth Century. Mechanicsburg: Stackpole Books. ISBN 978-1-4617-5109-0. OCLC 958548235.
