= Muhammad Atta-ullah Faizani =

Muhammad Atta-ullah Faizani (born 17 April 1923, date of death unknown) was an Afghan Islamic scholar. The honorific "Faizani", that means "something that overflows with God's light" was presented to him by an imam of the Kaaba during his Hajj.

== Early life and work ==
Faizani was born in Herat, Afghanistan on 17 April 1923 to a family of miagan, religious scholars said to be descended from an Islamic saint. As a child Faizani was home-schooled. in his early adolescence years, Faizani studied at a High School in Herat and finally at Kabul University, where he graduated in 1941. For eight years following his graduation he served as a High School principal in his hometown of Herat, until a passion for God overcame him. At this time Faizani left his home and traveled widely throughout the Islamic world of the mid-20th century seeking knowledge of Islam and its various practices.

== Spiritual retreat ==
As this period of traveling drew to a close, there came an intensification of his spiritual rigor and practices. He returned to Herat and secluded himself within a cave at a local mosque. There he remained for five years, performing ascetic practices including long periods of fasting, Zhikr and Fikr (also called Taffakkur). Taffakkur is a technique by which the practitioner "contemplates the Magnificence and Perfection of God in the creation."

== The Mazari Sharif sermons and first imprisonment ==
After a spiritual incident at the end of his ascetic practices, he began wandering again and ended up in Mazar-I-Sharif. Upon arriving in the city, Faizani was disappointed by the materialistic lifestyles of the elite and their unIslamic practices, based more upon Ignorance and power than upon brotherhood and religious sentiment. In response, Faizani began preaching, filling his sermons with the fire of moral and spiritual contentment.

His critical sermons addressed the corrupt political practices that surrounded the people of Mazar-i-Sharif and he spared neither cleric, nor government official, nor the landlords who participated in the crude feudalism of their country of that time. However, as is the norm when spiritual luminaries criticize established authorities in "developing" nations, Faizani quickly became a target for men of great power who did not want him to change the status quo, he was imprisoned.

== Becoming a sheikh ==
After his first imprisonment, his public life consisted of good works (charity, teaching, and spreading Islam), exercising public responsibility, and suffering short prison sentences for upsetting the secular authorities. Between these incarcerations, Faizani was able to create a library in Pul-i-Khumri (in Baghlan Province). It was here that Faizani attracted a large following of professionals (teachers and government officials), military personnel, and students. In time, his followers encompassed both Sunni and Shiite Muslims, an accomplishment not repeated by other groups in Afghanistan. To this day, the school of Islam that he initiated, the Madrassa-e Tawheed, consists of both Sunnis and Shi'ites.

The philosophy of the Madrassa-e Tawheed was unique in Afghanistan and promulgated the fusion of modern science and religion, hence its attraction among the young university students of that time who required more from Islam than just interpretations and fatwas given by the established, traditional mullahs out of touch with modern developments in science, technology, and politics. Additionally, the madrassa developed an intensive program of Zhikr (remembrance of Allah) and Fikr (tafakkur), which was also well-suited to military personnel stationed in far-flung and out of the way locales (a common occurrence in Afghanistan).

== The move to Kabul ==
In 1970, Faizani organized the Religious Scholars' Uprising at the Pul-i Khisti mosque in Kabul. Although the authorities thought that this protest would dissipate after a short while, the protest grew in numbers and persisted for weeks. To halt the demonstrations, the government cracked down on the restive demonstrators and imprisoned many of the protest's leaders with the help of the 444th Commando Battalion, including Faizani This was to be Faizani's fifth stint in prison and lasted a year and a half.

Upon his release, Faizani purchased a building next to the Pul-i Khisti mosque and started a library and book business selling only those books that he had actually read himself. At this time, Faizani also organized and managed zikr circles and invited members of the government, military, and scholastic institutions. The intention being to transform society by first transforming the self. It was through these meetings that Faizani eventually formed the political party Hizb-i Tawheed.

== Final imprisonment ==
To eliminate Faizani's strong influence among the upper echelons of Afghan society (especially among the military elites), in 1973 President Daoud of Afghanistan and his Communist advisors accused the Hizb-i Tawheed of organizing a coup d'etat. This accusation led to the final imprisonment of Faizani and hundreds of his disciples. It was during this last imprisonment that he suffered the cruelest tortures, including having his beard plucked out one hair at a time, being continually whipped, electrocuted, and having his teeth crushed.

All through this time, Faizani continually wrote books to his followers and would have each page secretly spirited out by his visitors. These pages would later be collected and the books published. In total, he is credited with having written 52 books on topics as diverse as taffakkur (fikr), Zikr, Fiqh, conditional and unconditional worship, etc.

Faizani disappeared from prison in 1979 shortly after the communist Khalqis came to power. It is probable that he was executed before the Soviet invasion took place.

The continuation of his work and teachings since then has been strongly supported in established schools in Afghanistan and in other countries by his students, led by his son, Ustad Mazhabi Sahib. The Madrassa-e Tawheed continues to this day and has established schools in various Western nations including large numbers in Germany, France, Canada, and the United States.

== Education ==
His religious learning includes:

- Tafsir: Interpretations, Jalalayn, Khazin, Roohul Ma'anee, Jamal and Roohul Bayan.
- Books of Hadith: Sahih (Bukharee and Muslim), Mishkat, Tirmidhi, Sunayn Abu-Daoud and Ibn-Maja
- Spiritual sciences of Faith and Belief, Politics, Jurisprudence, Islamic Law, Remembrance and Contemplation.

Faizani speaks Pashto, Persian, and Arabic. His son, Ustad Mazhabi Sahib (the present leader of Madrassa-e Tawheed), speaks Pashto, Persian, Arabic, and English.

== Body of work ==
Faizani has written fifty two volumes covering the various spiritual sciences. He is unique in that his teachings discuss 20th century faith and how the practitioner must use science and the creation as experienced through the five senses to establish the proof and certainty of belief in God.

The titles of seven volumes which make up a special series of "Goblets for the fortification faith", are:

- 1. General Questions on Faith, Mankind and the World
- 2. Knowing Oneself - Knowing God
- 3. Magnificence and Perfection of Glorious Artificer in Arts
- 4. Man and the Secrets of Nearness
- 5. Man and the Philosophy of Test
- 6. The Secrets of Creation up to the Court of Greatness
- 7. Alphabet of the Secrets of the Qur'an

The common point in all the writer's works is that all topics are extracted from the Qur'an, and are strongly affirmed by Qur'anic understanding. The works include references to relevant Qur'anic verses and hadith.

== Sources ==
- Edwards, David B., Before the Taliban: Genealogies of the Afghan Jihad. Berkeley: University of California Press, 2002.
