= National anthem of the Kingdom of Afghanistan (1926–1943) =

National anthem of Afghanistan from 1926 to 1943

Surūd Amani
English: Amani Anthem
- سرود امانی
- Former national anthem of Afghanistan
- Music: Khalid Rajab Bey
- Adopted: 1926
- Relinquished: 1943
- Succeeded by: National anthem of the Kingdom of Afghanistan

Audio sample
- "Amani Anthem": file; help

"Surūd Millī" (Persian: سرود ملی, lit. 'National Anthem'), or better known as "Surūd Amani" (Persian: سرود امانی, lit. 'Amani Anthem') was the first national anthem of the Kingdom of Afghanistan in 1926. It was composed and arranged by Khalid Rajab Bey, a Turkish professor at the School of Industry and Music who taught music in Kabul during the reign of Amanullah Khan. It was played on state visits abroad by Amanullah. Although it is difficult to say whether it has become a national anthem in the modern sense. It does not have its own title or text. In 1943, it was replaced by a second national anthem.

Today, however, this song is used as the anthem of the Royal Afghan government-in-exile, with the lyrics of the poem Ali Bood, written by Rumi.

== See also ==
- List of former national anthems
- National anthems of Afghanistan
- Music of Afghanistan
