= Kingdom of Afghanistan =

Afghan state from 1926 to 1973

Kingdom of Afghanistan: د افغانستان مملکت (Pashto) Də Afğānistān Mumlakat; پادشاهی افغانستان (Dari) Pādishāhī-yi Afghānistān
- 1926–1973
- Final flag (1931–1973) Final emblem (1931–1973)
- Anthem: درود شاهی; Durūd-i Shāhī "Royal Salute" (1926–1943) درود بزرگ; Durūd-i Buzurg "Grand Salute" (1943–1973)
- Capital: Kabul; Jalalabad (1929); 33°N 65°E
- Official languages: Pashto; Dari (Note: "Persian" was the official term used by the government of Afghanistan to refer to the language's local variant until 1964, when it was changed to "Dari" in the newly-promulgated constitution for political purposes.)
- Religion: 93% Islam; —75% Sunni; —19% Shia; 3% Hinduism; 2% Sikhism; 2% Judaism
- Demonym: Afghan (Note: from 1964 per royal decree, the term 'Afghan' applied to all citizens of Afghanistan and no longer exclusively to the Pashtun people)
- Government: Unitary absolute monarchy (1926–1964) Unitary parliamentary semi-constitutional monarchy (1964–1973)
- De facto ruler
  - 1933–1946: Mohammad Hashim Khan
  - 1946–1953: Shah Mahmud Khan
  - 1953–1963: Mohammad Daoud Khan
- King (Pādshāh)
  - 1926–1929 (first): Amanullah Khan (Note: Amanullah Khan was the King of Afghanistan from 9 June 1926 – 14 January 1929. Around 22 March 1929, Amanullah returned to Afghanistan, assembling forces in Kandahar to reach Kabul and to dispose of his rival, Habibullah Kalakani. In April 1929, he attempted to advance to Kabul but his forces were defeated in Moqor, Ghazni, and fled to British India on 23 May 1929, never returning to Afghanistan.)
  - 1933–1973 (last): Mohammad Zahir Shah
- Prime Minister
  - 1929–1946 (first): Mohammad Hashim Khan
  - 1972–1973 (last): Mohammad Shafiq
- Legislature: Loya Jirga (1926–1931); National Assembly (1931–1973)
  - Upper house: House of Elders (1931–1973)
  - Lower house: House of the People (1931–1973)
- Historical era: Interwar period · World War II · Cold War
  - Succeeds Afghan emirate: 9 June 1926
  - Civil War: 1928–1929
  - New constitution: 1 October 1964
  - Monarchy abolished: 17 July 1973

Area
- 1973: 652,864 km^{2} (252,072 sq mi)

Population
  - 1973: 12,108,963
- Currency: Afghan afghani
Preceded by	Succeeded by
Emirate of Afghanistan	Republic of Afghanistan
- Today part of: Afghanistan; Iran

The Kingdom of Afghanistan, (Note: Pashto: د افغانستان مملکت, romanized: Də Afğānistān Mumlakat or د افغانستان شاهي دولت, Də Afğānistān Šāhi Dawlat [d̪ə ʔäʊ.ɣɑ.nis.t̪ɑn ʃɑˈhi däʊ.lät]; Dari: پادشاهی افغانستان, romanized: Pādishāhī-yi Afghānistān [pʰɑː.d̪ɪ.ʃɑː.ɦíː.jɪ ʔäf.ɣɑː.nɪs.t̪ʰɑ́ːn]) also known as the Sublime State of Afghanistan, (Note: Pashto: د افغانستان لوړ دولت, romanized: Də Afğānistān Lwəṛ Dawlat [d̪ə ʔäʊ.ɣɑ.nis.t̪ɑn lwəɻ d̪äʊ.lät̪]; Dari: دولت علیه افغانستان, romanized: Dawlat-i Aliya-yi Afghānistān [d̪äw.lá.t̪ʰɪ ʔä.li.já.jɪ ʔäf.ɣɑː.nɪs.t̪ʰɑ́ːn]) was a monarchy operating under a unitary state in Central Asia that was established in 1926 as a successor state to the Emirate of Afghanistan. It was proclaimed by its first king, Amanullah Khan, seven years after he acceded to the throne. The monarchy ended in the 1973 Afghan coup d'état.

== History ==
Emir Amanullah Khan was keen on modernizing Afghanistan, provoking several uprisings led by his conservative opponents. One such rebellion broke out while he was visiting Europe in 1927. He abdicated in favour of his brother Inayatullah Khan, who only ruled for three days before the leader of the rebellion Habibullāh Kalakāni took power and reinstated the Emirate.

After ten months, Amanullah Khan's minister of war, Mohammad Nadir, returned from exile in India. His armies ousted the Saqqawist government and sacked Kabul. Afterwards, Nadir's forces apprehended and subsequently executed Kalakāni. Mohammed Nadir reinstated the kingdom, was proclaimed King of Afghanistan as Mohammad Nadir Shah in October 1929, and went on to revert the reformist path of the last king, Amanullah Khan. He was succeeded by his son, Mohammad Zahir Shah, whose rule started in 1933 and lasted for 39 years. Zahir Shah, the last King of Afghanistan, was eventually overthrown by his own cousin Mohammad Daoud Khan who successfully ended the centuries-old monarchy and established a republic. It was under the leadership of Zahir Shah that the Afghan government sought relationships with the outside world, most notably with the Soviet Union, France, the United Kingdom and the United States.

Under Zahir Shah, the government initiated numerous concerted efforts to bring education to Darai Nur, majority of the valley being inhabited by the Pashayi people. Because villagers were suspicious of the literacy campaign, wealthier inhabitants in the valley bribed officials and the Royal Afghan Army to keep their sons out of school. Poorer villagers, on the other hand were far more likely to attend, encouraging the view that the school program was not 'un-Islamic' nor 'anti-Islamic', leading more villagers to send their sons to school.

On 27 September 1934, during the reign of Zahir Shah, the Kingdom of Afghanistan joined the League of Nations. During World War II, Afghanistan remained neutral and pursued a diplomatic policy of non-alignment. Though being neutral in World War II, Afghanistan had relations with Nazi Germany, but that was severed after the Anglo-Soviet invasion of Iran.

Afghanistan was admitted into the United Nations on 29 August 1946. In 1947, Afghanistan was the only United Nations member to vote against admitting Pakistan into the United Nations. This was mostly done because of the kingdom's call for Pashtunistan. Nikita Khrushchev visited the capital of Kabul and endorsed the Afghan claims to Pashtunistan in 1955. Five years earlier, in 1950, Afghanistan signed friendship contracts with India and Lebanon, established political contacts with Syria and recognised the People's Republic of China. Efforts were additionally made to settle Afghan–Iranian disputes over the Helmand River, which are still ongoing between the regimes of the Islamic Emirate of Afghanistan and the Islamic Republic of Iran. Afghanistan also became a member of the Non-Aligned Movement in 1961. Daoud Khan, Prime Minister of Afghanistan at the time, worked hard for the development of modern industries, and education in the country. In July 1973, Daoud Khan staged a bloodless coup d'état while Zahir Shah was abroad convalescing from medical treatment. The next month, Zahir Shah abdicated, hoping to avoid a civil war, which officially marked the end of the Kingdom of Afghanistan and the beginning of the Republic.

== Geography ==
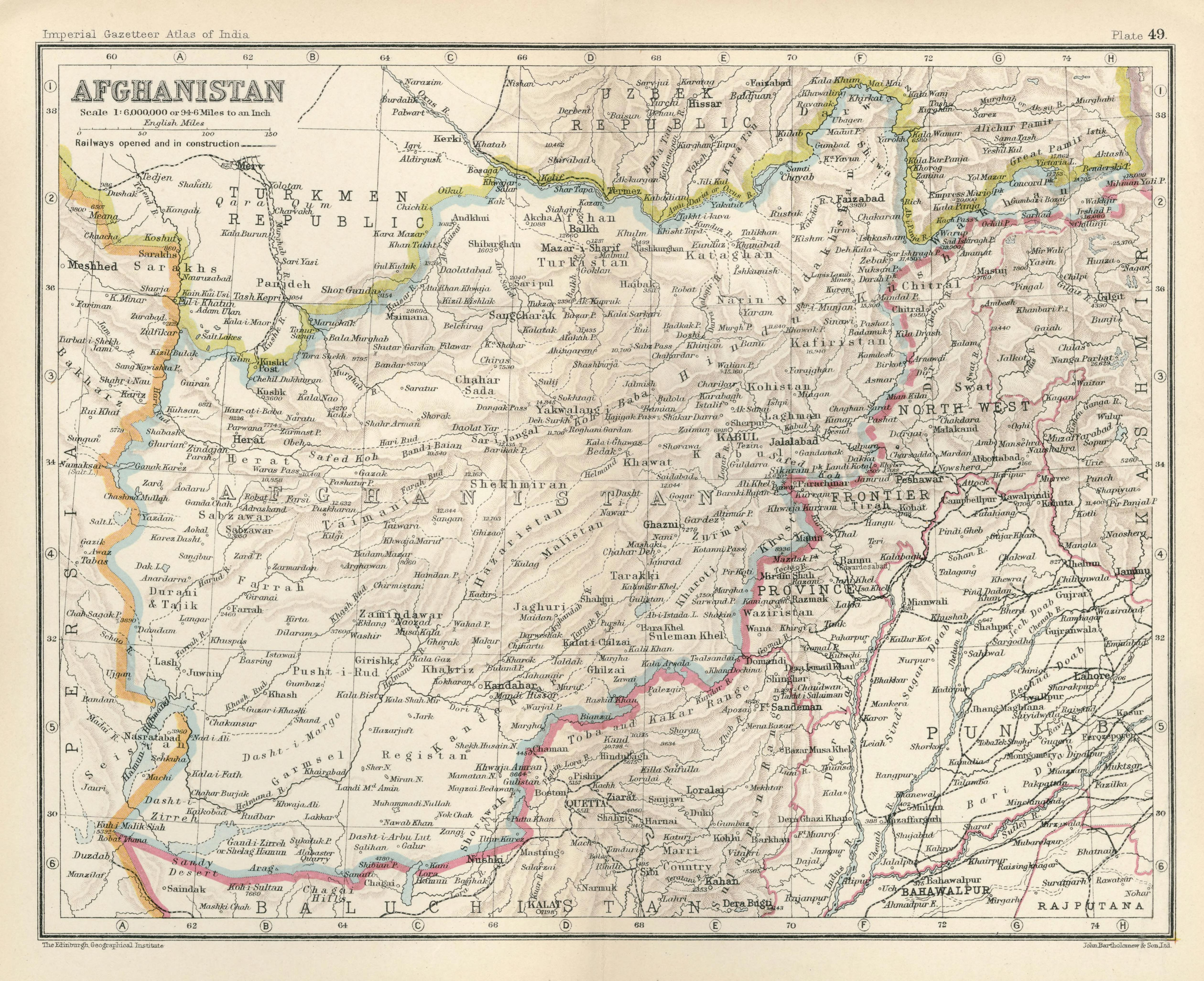
Map of Afghanistan, published in the 'Imperial Gazetteer of India' (Vol. XXVI, Atlas; 1931 revised edition; plate no. 49)

The Kingdom of Afghanistan bordered Iran on the west, the Soviet Union in the north, China on the east, and Pakistan] on the south. The mountainous and mostly dry country was 652,200 square kilometres (251,830 sq mi). The strange shape and borders of the country, most notably the Wakhan Corridor, were a result of its former role as a buffer state between the Soviet Union and the British India. Snow was common in most areas during winter and rainfall was small.

== Demographics ==
The country was made up of various ethnic groups such as the Pashtuns, Hazaras, and many others.

The majority of Afghans were Muslim, approximate 94% of the population. Around 90% of the Muslim population were Sunni, the rest were Shia. Majority of non-Muslims were Sikhs and Hindus.

Dari and Pashto were the official languages, and many Afghans were bilingual.

== Economy ==
Like the past and present-day Afghanistan, the economy relied greatly on agriculture and mining.

The United States and the Soviet Union both invested in neutral Afghanistan's economy to try to gain influence during the Cold War. This included the Four Point Program in 1951, when Afghanistan and the United States signed an agreement in Kabul to help assist the economic development in the economy, and the construction of a 100 km pipeline from Termez to Mazar-i-Sharif that was built by Soviet technicians and began in 1954. Afghanistan received $18,500,000 from the Export–Import Bank of the United States to help them purchase U.S. material, equipment, and services for the Helmand River valley developmental project.

In August 1961, Pakistan closed the border with Afghanistan, due to Prime Minister Daoud Khan's strong stance on Pashtunistan, but it re-opened the following May after Khan's resignation.

The country had deposits of talc, mica, silver, lead, beryl, chromite, copper, lapis lazuli, and iron ore.

== Military ==
King Zahir Shah's cousin, Daoud Khan, signed a $3 million arms deal with the Czechoslovak Socialist Republic and a 32.5 million arms deal with the Soviet Union in 1956. The deal gave the Afghan military imported T-34 tanks and MiG-17 jet fighters. A quarter to third of all Afghan officers had trained in the Soviet Union by 1973. It was also under the Kingdom of Afghanistan where the Afghan Commando Forces were formed as the Afghan Army's first special formations, notably the 242nd Parachute Battalion in 1965 and later, the 444th and the 455th Battalion in 1966 and 1973. All these battalions had airborne capabilities.

The flag of the Royal Afghan Guard under King Mohammad Zahir Shah until 1973

For these new commando formations, Captain Habibullah led the 242nd after returning from Fort Benning in the US to Afghanistan, additionally receiving training from the British Special Air Service. Major Rahmatullah Safi would become the Chief of Staff for the 444th, although he would become a commander a year later. Major Safi would prove to be a suitable leader, as he had undergone training in the British Royal Military Academy Sandhurst and in the Soviet Ryazan Higher Airborne Command School. In the years 1962 and 1963, before the establishment of the Afghan Commando Forces, Safi worked alongside the "National Mujahideen of Pashtunistan" against the Pakistani government, after the unsuccessful Bajaur Campaign of 1960–1961.

During Afghanistan's "Decade of Democracy", premises of the army university, a technical academy, the Royal Afghan Army Central Repair House were all constructed with the help of Czechoslovakia.

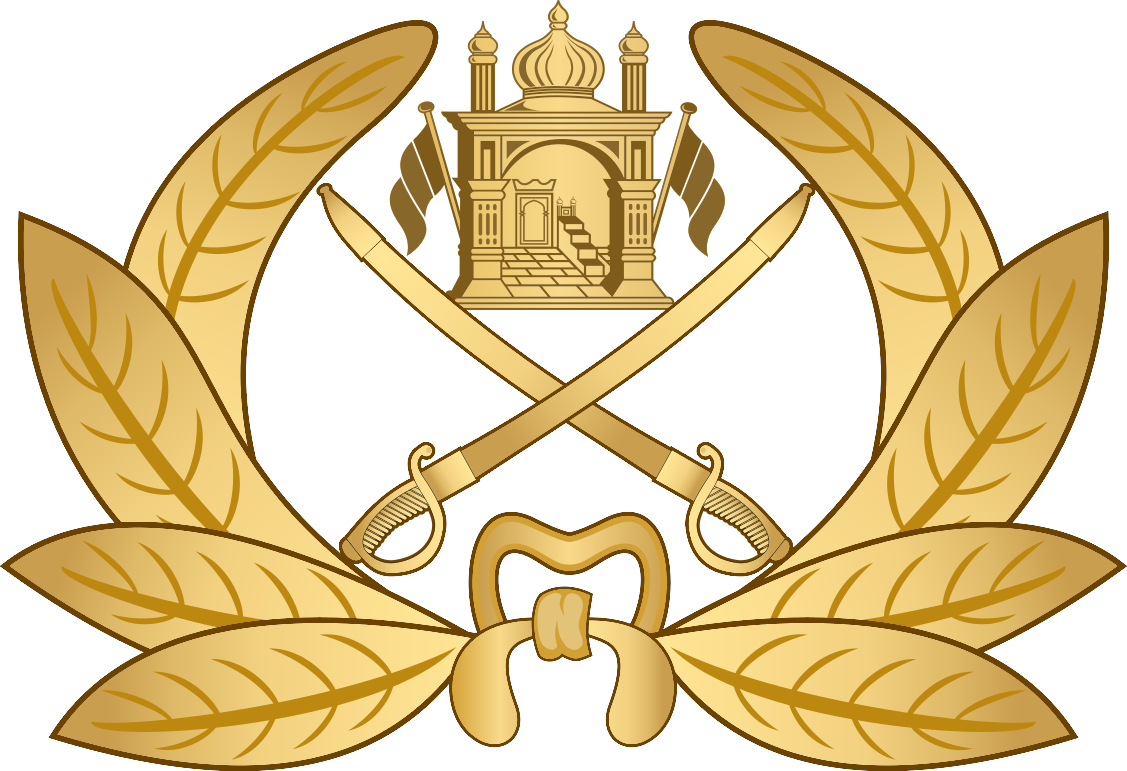
The military emblem of the Afghan Army from 1961–1974

== See also ==
- Barakzai dynasty
- European influence in Afghanistan
- List of Sunni dynasties
- Afghan Civil War (1928–1929)
