= Pul-e Khishti Mosque =

Mosque in Kabul, Afghanistan

- د پل خشتي جومات مسجد پل خشتی
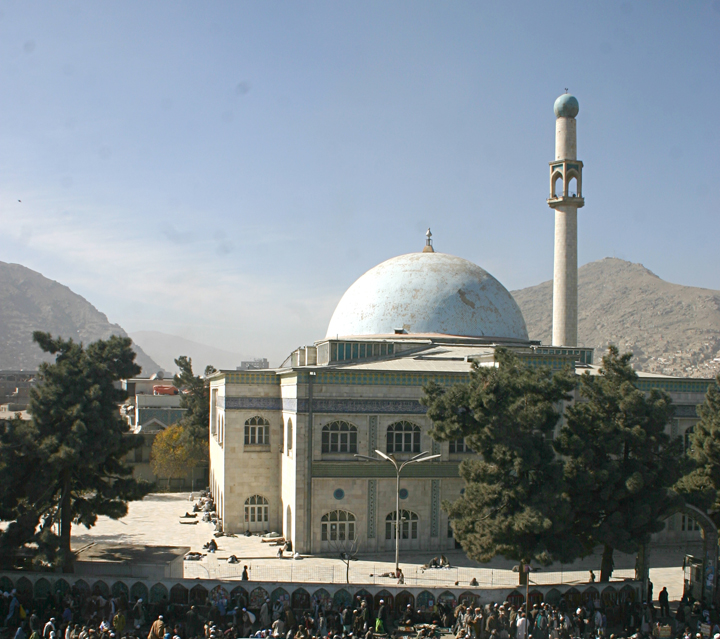
- The mosque in 1980

- Location of the mosque in Afghanistan

Religion
- Affiliation: Islam
- Ecclesiastical or organisational status: Mosque
- Status: Active

Location
- Location: Kabul
- Country: Afghanistan
- Interactive map of Pul-e Khishti Mosque
- Coordinates: 34°30′56″N 69°10′49″E

Architecture
- Type: Mosque
- Completed: 18th century

Specifications
- Dome: One
- Minaret: One

The Pul-e Khishti Mosque (Note: Pashto: د پل خشتي جومات Dari: مسجد پل خشتی) is the largest mosque in Kabul, Afghanistan. Located in the center of old Kabul, the Pul-e Khishti Mosque can be identified by its large blue dome. The mosque originally was erected in the late 18th century, but was largely rebuilt under Zahir Shah in the late 1960s. It was damaged during fighting in the 1990s, and was fully restored by 2019.

Many Kabulis assert that the imam of this mosque for many years in the early part of the 20th century was an Englishman who had converted to Islam, and that the imam returned to England after relinquishing his position at the mosque.

== Incidents ==
- 1970 Pul-e Khishti Mosque protest
- On 6 April 2022, a grenade attack on the mosque injured six worshippers.

== Gallery ==
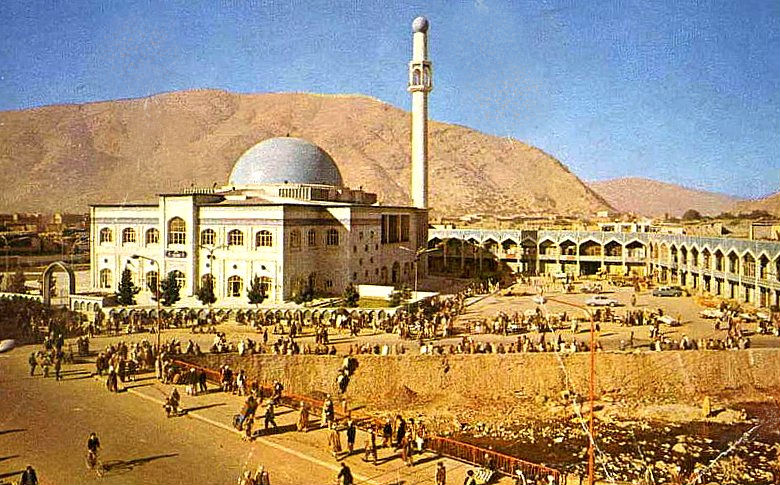
Postcard of Pul-e Khishti, c. 1960s

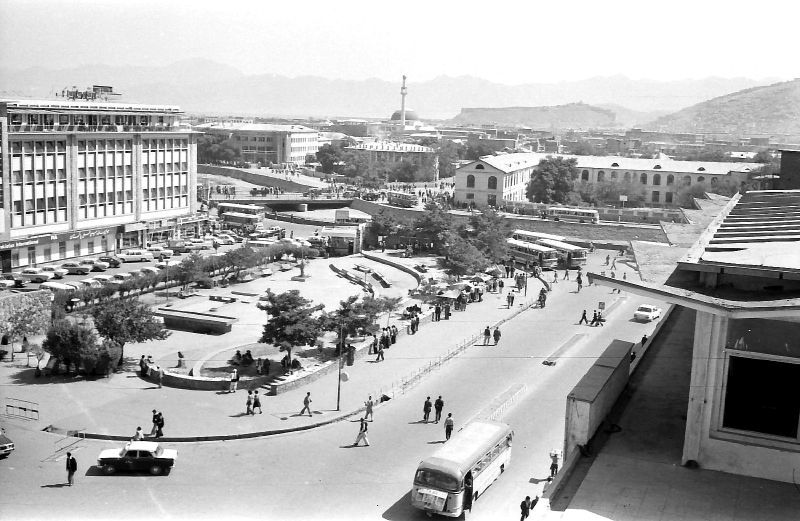
Kabul, c. 1979, with the mosque in the background

== See also ==
- Islam in Afghanistan
- List of mosques in Afghanistan
